= 2013–14 Abbotsford Heat season =

2013–14 Abbotsford Heat
- League: 5th AHL
- Division: 2nd West Division
- Conference: 5th Western Conference
- 2013–14 record: 43–25–5–3 (94 pts)
- Home record: 20–11–4–3
- Road record: 23–14–1–0
- Goals for: 237
- Goals against: 215

Team information
- General manager: Ryan Walter
- Coach: Troy Ward
- Assistant coach: Robbie Ftorek
- Captain: Dean Arsene
- Arena: Abbotsford Entertainment & Sports Centre
- Average attendance: 3,007

Team leaders
- Goals: Ben Street (28)
- Assists: Max Reinhart (42)
- Points: Max Reinhart (63)
- Penalty minutes: Josh Jooris (67)
- Plus/minus: Tyler Wotherspoon (+12)
- Wins: Joni Ortio (27)
- Goals against average: Doug Carr (1.92)

The 2013–14 Abbotsford Heat season was the American Hockey League franchise's fifth and final season in the city of Abbotsford, British Columbia.

== Off-season ==
After a year in the North Division, the Abbotsford Heat was moved to the newly renamed West Division, formerly the South Division, under an AHL realignment in the summer of 2013. The team lost their top leading scorers from the previous season in centres Ben Walter and Krys Kolanos, as well as forwards Dustin Sylvester, Roman Horák and Tyler Ruegsegger; defenseman Mike Matczak, and goaltender Leland Irving. Fourteen players from the previous season returned to the Abbotsford lineup for 2013–14, but the new roster also included several new young players. Newcomers included forwards Steve Begin, Markus Granlund, Josh Jooris, Micheal Ferland, Corban Knight and Ben Hanowski; goaltenders Laurent Brossoit and Joni Ortio; and defencemen Chad Billins, John Ramage, Tyler Wotherspoon Dean Arsene, and Pat Sieloff, who at age 19 was youngest player in AHL at that time. Head coach Troy Ward felt the team had good enthusiasm, pacing, discipline and puck management, and that with few veteran players, the entire team would have to put forward an equal effort.

Defenceman Mark Cundari and centers Greg Nemisz and Paul Byron were re-signed in the off-season, but winger Ryan Howse was suspended by the Calgary Flames organization for failing to report to training camp. The ECHL's Alaska Aces signed a one-year contract affiliating themselves with Calgary and Abbotsford during the off-season, and Brandon Astle named the Heat's new play-by-play broadcaster and media relations coordinator after having spent five seasons with the Langley Rivermen of the British Columbia Hockey League. After starting their training camp on September 20, Abbotsford played a single preseason game on October 22, winning 5–2 against the Utica Comets after Brett Olson opened the scoring in the first 94 seconds. Hanowski scored two goals and an assist, while Olson also recorded two assists. The game included seven fights and 104 total penalty minutes distributed.

2013–14 Preseason Game Log: 0–1–0–0

#	Date	Visitor	Score	Home	OT	Decision	Record
1	September 27	Utica	2–5	Abbotsford		Ortio	0–1–0–0

== Regular season ==
=== October ===
The Heat opened the season by splitting a pair of games against the Lake Erie Monsters on October 4 and 5, winning the first game after scoring three goals in seven minutes. Hanowski scored twice, and goaltender Reto Berra stopped 31 shots in his North American debut. Abbotsford lost the second match-up 3–2 in a game that included four fights and 74 penalty minutes. The Heat next split a pair of home games against the Milwaukee Admirals, winning their home opener in overtime on October 11, and losing the next day in a shootout where no Abbotsford skaters scored and Berra gave up two of four Milwaukee shots. The Heat started a three-game road trip with a 4–3 loss to the Oklahoma City Barons on October 18 after giving up a 4–0 lead in the first 24 minutes of the game. Abbotsford played the Barons again the next day, winning 2–1 in a shootout after Berra made 29 saves and Byron tied the game with 37 seconds left in regulation and the goaltender pulled.

The Heat suffered their worst loss of the season to date with a 9–3 loss to the Texas Stars after giving up eight unanswered goals, including six in the third period. Dallas winger Colton Sceviour scored a hat-trick against them. After splitting two games against Lake Erie on October 25 and 26, Abbotsford next went on a seven-game winning streak, tying a franchise record for consecutive wins, starting with a 5–4 win against Utica on October 30 after Knight scored 3:30 into overtime. After allowing three goals in nine shots in the first period, Berra was pulled from the net for Ortio, who stopped 17 of 18 shots. Blair Jones' assist on the game-winner started a six-game point streak for the centre. Billins, who led the Heat in goal-scoring at five, was called up to Calgary after the month was out.

=== November ===
Abbotsford started the month with a 4–3 win over Utica, with Jones scoring the game-winning breakaway goal with less than five minutes left in the game. Berra was called up to the Flames on October 2, forcing the Heat to take the unusual step of signing David Harris, the forty-year-old goaltending coach of Ontario Junior Hockey League's Newmarket Hurricanes, to an emergency contract to serve as the Heat's back-up goalie for their game that night. Abbotsford won that game 3–2 against the Hamilton Bulldogs after Ortio made 35 saves and stopped all three shootout attempts. The Heat scored all three of their shootout shots from Granlund, Knight and Jones, who had also scored two regulation goals. Afterward, Joey MacDonald, a veteran goaltender with experience in 129 NHL games, cleared waivers and joined the Abbotsford roster. Abbotsford started a four-game homestead with a 2–1 win over the San Antonio Rampage on November 5, with Ortio earning his fourth straight win and Granlund scoring his third goal in four games.

The Heat beat San Antonio again the next day, but the Rampage forced overtime after fighting back from a 2–0 deficit in the final six minutes of regulation. MacDonald, in his first start with the Heat, made 29 saves and stopped all four shootout shots, while Street and Jones scored in the shootout for Abbotsford. Billins was returned to the Heat on November 9, and recorded points in two consecutive wins over the Toronto Marlies on November 9 and 10. Winger Micheal Ferland scored his first two professional goals in the first game, a 4–3 victory, and the Heat won the second game 6–3 after scoring three unanswered goals in the final period, including a successful penalty shot by Granlund.

== Relocation ==
The 2013–14 season was the last season for the franchise to play in the British Columbia, as Abbotsford's city council announced that they had bought out the remaining years of the city's lease with the Flames for $5.5 million. With 3,007 fans per game, the Heat finished second-last in AHL attendance, and owing to a deal that guaranteed the Flames a minimum level of income, the team's attendance struggles cost the city $12 million total since the arrival of the Heat in 2009.

On April 15, 2014, the city of Abbotsford terminated the contract with the Heat, and on May 5, 2014 The AHL's board of governors announced its approval to relocate the team to Glens Falls, New York, for the 2014–15 season to play as the Adirondack Flames.

== Schedule and results ==
2013–14 Game Log – Regular season
October: 5–4–0–1 (Home: 2–1–0–1; Road: 3–3–0–0)

#	Date	Visitor	Score	Home	OT	Decision	Attendance	Record	Pts	Gamesheet
1	October 4	Abbotsford	5–2	Lake Erie		Berra	12,123	1–0–0–0	2	Gamesheet
2	October 5	Abbotsford	2–3	Lake Erie		Berra	6,289	1–1–0–0	2	Gamesheet
3	October 11	Milwaukee	2–3	Abbotsford	OT	Berra	3,413	2–1–0–0	4	Gamesheet
4	October 12	Milwaukee	2–1	Abbotsford	SO	Berra	1,814	2–1–0–1	5	Gamesheet
5	October 18	Abbotsford	3–4	Oklahoma City		Berra	2,680	2–2–0–1	5	Gamesheet
6	October 19	Abbotsford	2–1	Oklahoma City	SO	Berra	2,783	3–2–0–1	7	Gamesheet
7	October 20	Abbotsford	3–9	Texas		Brossoit	5,630	3–3–0–1	7	Gamesheet
8	October 25	Lake Erie	2–4	Abbotsford		Berra	1,947	4–3–0–1	9	Gamesheet
9	October 26	Lake Erie	3–1	Abbotsford		Berra	2,168	4–4–0–1	9	Gamesheet
10	October 30	Abbotsford	5–4	Utica		Ortio	2,500	5–4–0–1	11	Gamesheet

November: 12–2–1–0 (Home: 4–1–1–0; Road: 8–1–0–0)

#	Date	Visitor	Score	Home	OT	Decision	Attendance	Record	Pts	Gamesheet
11	November 1	Abbotsford	4–3	Utica		Ortio	3,169	6–4–0–1	13	Gamesheet
12	November 2	Abbotsford	3–2	Hamilton	SO	Ortio	4,253	7–4–0–1	15	Gamesheet
13	November 5	San Antonio	1–2	Abbotsford		Ortio	1,364	8–4–0–1	17	Gamesheet
14	November 6	San Antonio	2–3	Abbotsford	SO	MacDonald	1,389	9–4–0–1	19	Gamesheet
15	November 9	Toronto	3–4	Abbotsford		Ortio	3,024	10–4–0–1	21	Gamesheet
16	November 10	Toronto	3–6	Abbotsford		MacDonald	2,408	11–4–0–1	23	Gamesheet
17	November 13	Abbotsford	7–3	Texas		Ortio	4,412	12–4–0–1	25	Gamesheet
18	November 15	Abbotsford	5–4	Oklahoma City		Ortio	3,098	13–4–0–1	27	Gamesheet
19	November 16	Abbotsford	1–4	Oklahoma City		MacDonald	3,163	13–5–0–1	27	Gamesheet
20	November 19	Abbotsford	4–3	Milwaukee		Ortio	2,528	14–5–0–1	29	Gamesheet
21	November 20	Abbotsford	4–2	Rockford		MacDonald	2,493	15–5–0–1	31	Gamesheet
22	November 23	Abbotsford	4–0	Iowa		Ortio	5,326	16–5–0–1	33	Gamesheet
23	November 24	Abbotsford	2–1	Iowa		MacDonald	4,022	17–5–0–1	35	Gamesheet
24	November 29	Utica	3–2	Abbotsford		Ortio	4,260	17–6–0–1	35	Gamesheet
25	November 30	Utica	4–3	Abbotsford	OT	MacDonald	4,984	17–6–1–1	36	Gamesheet

December: 6–3–0–0 (Home: 5–1–0–0; Road: 1–2–0–0)

#	Date	Visitor	Score	Home	OT	Decision	Attendance	Record	Pts	Gamesheet
26	December 6	San Antonio	2–4	Abbotsford		Ortio	2,780	18–6–1–1	38	Gamesheet
27	December 7	San Antonio	2–5	Abbotsford		Ortio	2,142	19–6–1–1	40	Gamesheet
28	December 11	Iowa	2–6	Abbotsford		Ortio	1,409	20–6–1–1	42	Gamesheet
29	December 12	Iowa	4–2	Abbotsford		MacDonald	1,536	20–7–1–1	42	Gamesheet
30	December 18	Abbotsford	2–4	Utica		MacDonald	2,444	20–8–1–1	42	Gamesheet
31	December 20	Abbotsford	0–3	Utica		Ortio	3,225	20–9–1–1	42	Gamesheet
32	December 22	Abbotsford	3–2	Hamilton		Ortio	4,281	21–9–1–1	44	Gamesheet
33	December 27	Oklahoma City	1–5	Abbotsford		Ortio	2,931	22–9–1–1	46	Gamesheet
34	December 28	Oklahoma City	2–4	Abbotsford		Ortio	2,149	23–9–1–1	48	Gamesheet

January: 4–5–2–0 (Home: 1–2–2–0; Road: 3–3–0–0)

#	Date	Visitor	Score	Home	OT	Decision	Attendance	Record	Pts	Gamesheet
35	January 3	Hamilton	2–1	Abbotsford		Ortio	2,638	23–10–1–1	48	Gamesheet
36	January 4	Hamilton	3–1	Abbotsford		MacDonald	2,458	23–11–1–1	48	Gamesheet
37	January 7	Abbotsford	1–5	San Antonio		Ortio	3,060	23–12–1–1	48	Gamesheet
38	January 10	Abbotsford	0–5	Texas		MacDonald	5,628	23–13–1–1	48	Gamesheet
39	January 11	Abbotsford	3–2	San Antonio		Ortio	7,461	24–13–1–1	50	Gamesheet
40	January 15	Abbotsford	4–3	Rockford	OT	MacDonald	2638	25–13–1–1	52	Gamesheet
41	January 17	Abbotsford	0–3	Grand Rapids		MacDonald	8,098	25–14–1–1	52	Gamesheet
42	January 18	Abbotsford	3–2	Grand Rapids		Ortio	9,170	26–14–1–1	54	Gamesheet
43	January 24	Utica	1–0	Abbotsford	OT	Ortio	4,396	26–14–2–1	55	Gamesheet
44	January 25	Utica	4–3	Abbotsford	OT	MacDonald	6,247	26–14–3–1	56	Gamesheet
45	January 31	Hamilton	0–6	Abbotsford		Ortio	3,328	27–14–3–1	58	Gamesheet

February: 6–3–1–1 (Home: 4–1–0–1; Road: 2–2–1–0)

#	Date	Visitor	Score	Home	OT	Decision	Attendance	Record	Pts	Gamesheet
46	February 1	Hamilton	1–4	Abbotsford		Ortio	3,968	28–14–3–1	60	Gamesheet
47	February 4	Charlotte	1–7	Abbotsford		Roy	1,790	29–14–3–1	62	Gamesheet
48	February 5	Charlotte	3–4	Abbotsford		Roy	1,528	30–14–3–1	64	Gamesheet
49	February 8	Texas	2–3	Abbotsford		Roy	3,273	31–14–3–1	66	Gamesheet
50	February 9	Texas	7–2	Abbotsford		Roy	2,569	31–15–3–1	66	Gamesheet
51	February 14	Abbotsford	5–1	Charlotte		Ortio	4,354	32–15–3–1	68	Gamesheet
52	February 16	Abbotsford	4–5	Charlotte	OT	Ortio	5,525	32–15–4–1	69	Gamesheet
53	February 21	Abbotsford	4–2	Milwaukee		Roy	10,277	33–15–4–1	71	Gamesheet
54	February 22	Abbotsford	3–5	Chicago		Roy	13,027	33–16–4–1	71	Gamesheet
55	February 23	Abbotsford	0–2	Chicago		Dell	6,335	33–17–4–1	71	Gamesheet
56	February 28	Grand Rapids	4–3	Abbotsford	SO	Roy	3,068	33–17–4–2	72	Gamesheet

March: 4–8–1–0 (Home: 1–5–1–0; Road: 3–3–0–0)

#	Date	Visitor	Score	Home	OT	Decision	Attendance	Record	Pts	Gamesheet
57	March 1	Grand Rapids	5–2	Abbotsford		MacDonald	2,774	33–18–4–2	72	Gamesheet
58	March 4	Texas	3–1	Abbotsford		MacDonald	6,827	33–19–4–2	72	Gamesheet
59	March 5	Texas	4–3	Abbotsford	OT	Roy	2,071	33–19–5–2	73	Gamesheet
60	March 8	Chicago	7–2	Abbotsford		Roy	3,281	33–20–5–2	73	Gamesheet
61	March 9	Chicago	4–1	Abbotsford		Roy	2,286	33–21–5–2	73	Gamesheet
62	March 14	Utica	1–3	Abbotsford		Roy	3417	34–21–5–2	75	Gamesheet
63	March 15	Utica	3–1	Abbotsford		Roy	3,781	34–22–5–2	75	Gamesheet
64	March 19	Abbotsford	1–3	Hamilton		Dell	2,379	34–23–5–2	75	Gamesheet
65	March 22	Abbotsford	5–1	Hamilton		Dell	5,344	35–23–5–2	77	Gamesheet
66	March 23	Abbotsford	2–3	Toronto		Ortio	4,992	35–24–5–2	77	Gamesheet
67	March 28	Abbotsford	2–1	Utica	OT	Ortio	3,815	36–24–5–2	79	Gamesheet
68	March 29	Abbotsford	7–2	Utica		Ortio	3,815	37–24–5–2	81	Gamesheet
69	March 30	Abbotsford	4–6	Toronto		Ortio	5,123	37–25–5–2	81	Gamesheet

April: 6–0–0–1 (Home: 3–0–0–1; Road: 3–0–0–0)

#	Date	Visitor	Score	Home	OT	Decision	Attendance	Record	Pts	Gamesheet
70	April 4	Rockford	3–6	Abbotsford		Ortio	3,088	38–25–5–2	83	Gamesheet
71	April 5	Rockford	3–5	Abbotsford		Ortio	3,276	39–25–5–2	85	Gamesheet
72	April 11	Oklahoma City	2–3	Abbotsford		Ortio	3,403	40–25–5–2	87	Gamesheet
73	April 13	Oklahoma City	5–4	Abbotsford	SO	Carr	5,065	40–25–5–3	88	Gamesheet
74	April 17	Abbotsford	3–1	San Antonio		Ortio	9,828	41–25–5–3	90	Gamesheet
75	April 18	Abbotsford	3–0	San Antonio		Carr	12,473	42–25–5–3	92	Gamesheet
76	April 19	Abbotsford	4–3	Texas		Ortio	6,863	43–25–5–3	94	Gamesheet

Legend: Win (2 points) Loss (0 points) Overtime/shootout loss (1-point)

== Playoffs ==
=== Game log ===
The Abbotsford Heat entered the Calder Cup playoffs as the 5th seed in the Western Conference. They were eliminated during the WC Quarterfinals in Game 4 against the Grand Rapids Griffins.

2014 Calder Cup Playoffs
Western Conference Quarterfinals vs. Grand Rapids Griffins: Grand Rapids won series 3–1

#	Date	Visitor	Score	Home	OT	Decision	Attendance	Series	Recap
1	April 25	Grand Rapids	2–1	Abbotsford	OT	Ortio	2,420	0–1	Recap
2	April 26	Grand Rapids	7–2	Abbotsford		Ortio	2,154	0–2	Recap
3	April 30	Abbotsford	2–1	Grand Rapids		Ortio	7,193	1–2	Recap
4	May 2	Abbotsford	3–5	Grand Rapids		Ortio	7,641	1–3	Recap

Legend: = If needed = Win = Loss = Playoff series win

== Player statistics ==
=== Skaters ===
Note: GP = Games played; G = Goals; A = Assists; Pts = Points; +/− = Plus/minus; PIM = Penalty minutes
Updated as of June 5, 2014

Regular season
Player	GP	G	A	Pts	+/-	PIM
Max Reinhart^{‡}	66	21	42	63	6	47
Ben Street	58	28	30	58	−10	24
Corban Knight	70	18	27	45	11	50
Markus Granlund^{*}	52	25	21	44	10	22
Brett Olson	75	17	27	41	8	38
Chad Billins	65	10	31	41	6	40
Blair Jones	38	17	21	38	−8	47
Ben Hanowski^{*}	55	13	18	31	1	18
Sven Baertschi	41	13	16	29	1	18
Josh Jooris^{*}	73	11	16	27	0	67
Derek Smith^{‡}	32	7	17	24	9	22
Corey Locke	30	4	19	23	0	8
Micheal Ferland^{*}	25	6	12	18	−4	31
Paul Byron	23	5	13	18	10	4
Kane Lafranchise	34	0	13	13	−1	2
Carter Bancks	72	3	8	11	9	53
Mark Cundari	32	4	6	10	−1	45
Greg Nemisz	32	5	4	9	4	9
Braden Lamb	44	3	6	9	-3	25
Tyler Wotherspoon^{*}	48	1	8	9	12	12
Shane O'Brien	31	3	5	8	6	58
Roman Horak^{‡}	13	2	5	7	−4	6
Evan Trupp	17	1	6	7	−3	10
Dean Arsene	42	1	6	7	−4	43
Tim Miller	14	1	4	5	2	11
Drew MacKenzie	17	1	4	5	2	14
Emile Poirier	2	2	2	4	4	0
Chris Breen^{‡}	41	1	3	4	−10	29
Zach Davies	14	3	0	3	−2	6
Turner Elson^{*}	37	2	1	3	1	19
Brett Kulak	6	1	2	3	5	2
Brendan Connolly	6	1	1	2	2	0
Lane MacDermid	25	1	1	2	−2	24
Jordan Kremyr	16	1	0	1	-1	6
Allan McPherson	5	0	1	1	−2	2
Adrian Foster	5	0	1	1	0	2
Kyle Ostrow	5	0	1	1	−2	4
Zach McKelvie	13	0	1	1	−1	14
John Ramage^{*}	50	0	1	1	2	46
Collin Valcourt	1	0	0	0	0	0
Jordan Knackstedt	1	0	0	0	−1	5
Patrick Sieloff^{*}	2	0	0	0	1	0
James Martin	2	0	0	0	0	2
Peter Sivak	3	0	0	0	−1	2
Morgan Klimchuk	4	0	0	0	−2	4
David Eddy^{‡}	5	0	0	0	−2	5
Garnet Hathaway	8	0	0	0	1	10
Trevor Gillies	9	0	0	0	0	12
Brett Lyon^{‡}	9	0	0	0	−1	32

^{†}Denotes player spent time with another team before joining team. Stats reflect time with the team only.
^{‡}Left the team mid-season
^{*}Rookie

Playoffs
Player	GP	G	A	Pts	+/-	PIM
Markus Granlund	4	2	3	5	−4	2
Max Reinhart	4	1	3	4	−4	4
Chad Billins	4	0	2	2	−4	2
Chris Breen	4	0	2	2	−2	2
Emile Poirier	3	1	0	1	0	2
Kane Lafranchise	4	1	0	1	0	2
Corey Locke	4	1	0	1	1	0
Shane O'Brien	4	1	0	1	−3	18
Brett Olson	4	1	0	1	2	2
Corban Knight	2	0	1	1	−1	2
Sven Baertschi	4	0	1	1	−3	6
Ben Hanowski	4	0	1	1	−3	2
Blair Jones	4	0	1	1	−4	6
Ben Street	4	0	1	1	1	2
Garnet Hathaway	1	0	0	0	−1	10
Josh Jooris	1	0	0	0	−1	2
Derek Smith	1	0	0	0	0	0
Tim Miller	2	0	0	0	0	0
Dean Arsene	3	0	0	0	1	18
Trevor Gillies	3	0	0	0	0	0
Carter Bancks	4	0	0	0	−1	0
Brett Kulak	4	0	0	0	0	2

=== Goaltenders ===
Note: GP = Games played; TOI = Time on ice; W = Wins; L = Losses; GA = Goals against; GAA = Goals against average; SV = Saves; SA = Shots against; SV% = Save percentage; SO = Shutouts; G = Goals; A = Assists; PIM = Penalty minutes
Updated as of April 20, 2014

Regular season
Player	GP	TOI	W	L	GA	GAA	SV	SA	SV%	SO	G	A	PIM
Joni Ortio^{*}	37	2133	27	8	83	2.33	1036	1119	0.926	2	0	0	6
Joey MacDonald	16	900	5	10	45	3.00	447	492	0.909	0	0	1	0
Olivier Roy	12	615	5	6	34	3.31	312	346	0.902	0	0	1	0
Reto Berra	9	473	4	3	21	2.66	208	229	0.908	0	0	0	0
Aaron Dell	6	262	1	2	10	2.29	118	128	0.922	0	0	0	0
Laurent Brossoit^{‡}	2	94	0	1	9	5.72	42	51	0.824	0	0	0	0
Doug Carr	2	125	1	0	4	1.92	49	53	0.925	1	0	0	0
Totals		4628:04	43	30	212	2.75	2212	2424	0.913	3	0	2	6

Playoffs
Player	GP	TOI	W	L	GA	GAA	SV	SA	SV%	SO	G	A	PIM
Joni Ortio	4	249:42	1	3	12	2.88	130	142	0.915	0	0	0	0
Doug Carr	1	28:41	0	0	2	4.18	13	15	0.867	0	0	0	0
Totals		279:27	1	3	15	3.22	143	158	0.905	0	0	0	0

^{‡}Left the team mid-season
^{*}Rookie

== Milestones ==
Player	Milestone	Reached
Reto Berra	1st AHL Game; 1st AHL Win	October 4, 2013
Turner Elson	1st AHL Goal	October 11, 2013
Laurent Brossoit	1st AHL Game	October 18, 2013
Tyler Wotherspoon	1st AHL Goal	October 20, 2013
Joni Ortio	1st AHL Win	October 30, 2013
