= 2013–14 Rockford IceHogs season =

American ice hockey club season

2013–14 Rockford IceHogs
- League: 18th AHL
- Division: 4th Midwest Division
- Conference: 9th Western Conference
- 2013–14 record: 33–29–5–4 (75 pts)
- Home record: 22–9–1–2
- Road record: 11–20–4–2
- Goals for: 218
- Goals against: 244

Team information
- General manager: Mark Bernard
- Coach: Ted Dent
- Assistant coach: Mark Osiecki
- Captain: Jared Nightingale
- Alternate captains: Wade Brookbank
- Arena: BMO Harris Bank Center
- Average attendance: 4,737 (80.3%); Total: 161,065

Team leaders
- Goals: Jeremy Morin (24)
- Assists: Adam Clendening (44)
- Points: Adam Clendening (56)
- Penalty minutes: Jared Nightingale (112)
- Plus/minus: (+) Klas Dahlbeck (+22) (−) Jared Nightingale (−14)
- Wins: Jason LaBarbera (14)
- Goals against average: Antti Raanta (2.83)

The 2013–14 Rockford IceHogs season is the franchise's 7th season in the American Hockey League. The season began on October 5, 2013.

== Off-season ==
Mark Osiecki was hired as the Rockford assistant coach in July, three months after his release as Ohio State Buckeyes men's ice hockey head coach due to an undisclosed difference of opinion with management. The IceHogs' home arena, BMO Harris Bank Center, underwent $2 million in renovations during the off-season, including 400 new lower-level seats, upgraded concessions, locker room renovations, new lighting and other improvements. That work stretched into the regular season, wrapping up in the third week of October.

Rockford saw several player departures during the off-season including forwards David Gilbert, Joakim Nordström, Kyle Beach, Rostislav Olesz, Ben Smith and Martin St. Pierre; defensemen Joseph Lavin and Ryan Stanton; and Carter Hutton, who had the team's starting goaltender for the past two years. Although goaltender Mac Carruth initially remained with Rockford, he was reassigned to ECHL's Toledo Walleye two games into the regular season. Newcomers to the IceHogs included defensemen Viktor Svedberg, Jared Nightingale, Theo Peckham, and Joe Gleason; forwards Maxim Shalunov, Alex Broadhurst, Pat Mullane, Brad Winchester, and Drew LeBlanc; and goaltender Antti Raanta. The team also re-signed winger Wade Brookbank. Several players had skated with the team last year but appeared in less than 10 games, including goaltender Kent Simpson, and forwards Phillip Danault, Byron Froese, Mark McNeill and Garret Ross. Ten of the 23 players on IceHogs regular roster going into the regular season were newcomers. Nine of them were rookies, with seven making their AHL debut, making them the youngest Rockford team in two years. Nine of the players had at least some experience in the National Hockey League.

The IceHogs had a shorter off-season than usual due to their major league affiliate, the Chicago Blackhawks, having an extended 2013 Stanley Cup playoffs and winning the Stanley Cup. Head coach Ted Dent believed Rockford would have to develop new top scorers to replace those who left the team. Nevertheless, much of the focus in off-season practices went toward defense and discipline, particularly on avoiding taking penalties. The IceHogs played a pair of preseason exhibition away games, starting with a 2–1 victory over the Chicago Wolves on September 25. Jared Brown and Matt Lowry both scored for Rockford, but were nevertheless released from the team the next day. The IceHogs lost the preseason finale 2–1 to the Milwaukee Admirals on September 27, which Winchester scoring the team's only goal. The game went to a shootout, where nobody from either team scored until Milwaukee's Mathieu Tousignant in the tenth round.

2013–14 Preseason Game Log: 1–0–0–1

#	Date	Visitor	Score	Home	OT	Decision	Record
1	September 25	Rockford	2–1	Chicago		Carruth	1–0–0–0
2	September 27	Rockford	1–2	Milwaukee	SO	Raanta	1–0–0–1

== Regular season ==
=== October ===
Rockford began their regular season with five away games due to the BMO Harris Bank Center renovations. In their first two games, the IceHogs allowed a total of 100 shots on goal. Their season opener, a 3–1 loss to the San Antonio Rampage on October 5, included 56 shots on goal against, a team record for a single game. Simpson, who filled in for Raanta after he was injured at the start of the first season made 49 saves, which was also a team record for one game. Rockford won their next two games, including a 5–2 win over the Lake Erie Monsters on October 11 in which they scored five unanswered goals before allowing their opponent to score. Forward Brandon Pirri was recalled to the Chicago Blackhawks. Rockford had their first season loss on October 12, also against Lake Erie, falling 5–1 after being outshot 20–4 in the first period and failing to score until they were trailing by four goals. After that game, the IceHogs ranked last in the league for shots on goal, allowing an average of 39.5 per game.

The IceHogs won their next two games, both with dramatic comebacks at the end of the third period. They beat Chicago 5–3 on October 18 after scoring two goals in the final 90 seconds, and defeated the Grand Rapids Griffins 5–4 the next day after Danault scored his first professional goal with 72 seconds left in regulation and forced a shootout. Nordström, who had been a surprise pick to join the Chicago Blackhawks in the off-season due to his penalty kill abilities, was returned to Rockford on October 20. The IceHogs lost 5–4 in overtime to the Hamilton Bulldogs on October 22 after surrendering a lead three times. McNeill scored twice for Rockford, and Simpson made 31 saves. Rockford won their next three games, despite their opponent scoring first in each match-up. In their October 23 game against the Toronto Marlies, Rockford gave up a two-goal lead for the third consecutive game, but Jeremy Morin scored the game-winner to secure a 3–2 victory. After a playing seven of their previous eight games away, the IceHogs will play eight of their next 11 matches at home. After two more wins, Rockford was in first place in the Western Conference, and tied with Texas Stars for most goals scored at 34. The IceHogs saw their first home loss on October 31, falling 5–3 to the Charlotte Checkers on October 31. Continuing a pattern of trailing early, Rockford came back from a 3–0 deficit to tie the game but ultimately fell short.

=== November ===
The IceHogs also lost their next two match-ups, the last knocked them out of first place. It marked the fifth straight game where they trailed while going into the third period.

== Schedule and results ==
2013–14 Game Log – Regular season

October: 7–3–1–0 (Home: 3–1–0–0; Road: 4–2–1–0) Pts. 15
#	Date	Visitor	Score	Home	OT	Decision	Attendance	Record	Pts	Gamesheet
1	October 5	Rockford	1–3	San Antonio		Simpson	5,455	0–1–0–0	0	Gamesheet
2	October 6	Rockford	4–3	Texas		Simpson	3,166	1–1–0–0	2	Gamesheet
3	October 11	Rockford	5–2	Lake Erie		Raanta	5,784	2–1–0–0	4	Gamesheet
4	October 12	Rockford	1–5	Lake Erie		Raanta	5,611	2–2–0–0	4	Gamesheet
5	October 18	Rockford	5–3	Chicago		Simpson	3,949	3–2–0–0	6	Gamesheet
6	October 19	Grand Rapids	4–5	Rockford	SO	Raanta	6,202	4–2–0–0	8	Gamesheet
7	October 22	Rockford	4–5	Hamilton	OT	Simpson	1,990	4–2–1–0	9	Gamesheet
8	October 23	Rockford	3–2	Toronto		Raanta	4,184	5–2–1–0	11	Gamesheet
9	October 26	Charlotte	1–2	Rockford	SO	Raanta	3,124	6–2–1–0	13	Gamesheet
10	October 27	Texas	2–4	Rockford		Raanta	6,353	7–2–1–0	15	Gamesheet
11	October 31	Charlotte	5–3	Rockford		Raanta	5,936	7–3–1–0	15	Gamesheet

November: 5–8–0–0 (Home: 4–3–0–0; Road: 1–5–0–0) Pts. 10
#	Date	Visitor	Score	Home	OT	Decision	Attendance	Record	Pts	Gamesheet
12	November 1	Rockford	2–4	Milwaukee		Simpson	4,142	7–4–1–0	15	Gamesheet
13	November 3	Grand Rapids	3–1	Rockford		Raanta	3,033	7–5–1–0	15	Gamesheet
14	November 6	Rockford	2–6	Grand Rapids		Raanta	6,118	7–6–1–0	15	Gamesheet
15	November 8	Iowa	1–3	Rockford		Raanta	4,101	8–6–1–0	17	Gamesheet
16	November 9	Iowa	5–2	Rockford		Raanta	4,082	8–7–1–0	17	Gamesheet
17	November 15	Rockford	3–5	Grand Rapids		Simpson	9,260	8–8–1–0	17	Gamesheet
18	November 16	San Antonio	2–4	Rockford		Raanta	4,394	9–8–1–0	19	Gamesheet
19	November 20	Abbotsford	4–2	Rockford		Simpson	2,493	9–9–1–0	19	Gamesheet
20	November 23	Rockford	2–5	Charlotte		Carruth	7,672	9–10–1–0	19	Gamesheet
21	November 24	Rockford	4–3	Charlotte		Simpson	4,343	10–10–1–0	21	Gamesheet
22	November 27	Milwaukee	1–2	Rockford	OT	Simpson	3,440	11–10–1–0	23	Gamesheet
23	November 29	Rockford	1–7	Chicago		Simpson	7,554	11–11–1–0	23	Gamesheet
24	November 30	Chicago	3–4	Rockford		Simpson	5,451	12–11–1–0	25	Gamesheet

December: 3–5–2–0 (Home: 2–3–0–0; Road: 1–2–2–0) Pts. 8
#	Date	Visitor	Score	Home	OT	Decision	Attendance	Record	Pts	Gamesheet
25	December 5	Rockford	2–3	Charlotte	OT	Simpson	3,826	12–11–2–0	26	Gamesheet
26	December 7	Rockford	5–3	Charlotte		Simpson	7,719	13–11–2–0	28	Gamesheet
27	December 13	Oklahoma City	3–4	Rockford		Carruth	3,359	14–11–2–0	30	Gamesheet
28	December 14	Oklahoma City	4–5	Rockford	SO	Carruth	4,738	15-11–2–0	32	Gamesheet
29	December 15	Rockford	1–3	Iowa		York	6,312	15–12–2–0	32	Gamesheet
30	December 20	Rockford	2–3	Grand Rapids	OT	Simpson	8,269	15–12–3–0	33	Gamesheet
31	December 21	Milwaukee	3–1	Rockford		Simpson	3,975	15–13–3–0	33	Gamesheet
32	December 26	Rockford	2–5	Iowa		Simpson	6,151	15–14–3–0	33	Gamesheet
33	December 27	Grand Rapids	4–2	Rockford		Carruth	4,105	15–15–3–0	33	Gamesheet
34	December 30	Charlotte	3–2	Rockford		Simpson	4,599	15–16–3–0	33	Gamesheet

January: 5–5–1–2 (Home: 4–1–1–1; Road: 1–4–0–1) Pts. 13
#	Date	Visitor	Score	Home	OT	Decision	Attendance	Record	Pts	Gamesheet
35	January 3	Iowa	3–2	Rockford	SO	Carruth	3,326	15–16–3–1	34	Gamesheet
36	January 4	Grand Rapids	2–4	Rockford		LaBarbera	4,145	16–16–3–1	36	Gamesheet
37	January 5	Rockford	3–4	Chicago	SO	LaBarbera	7,530	16–16–3–2	37	Gamesheet
38	January 8	Rockford	2–4	Grand Rapids		LaBarbera	3,672	16–17–3–2	37	Gamesheet
39	January 10	Lake Erie	3–4	Rockford		Simpson	3,846	17–17–3–2	39	Gamesheet
40	January 11	Lake Erie	1–6	Rockford		LaBarbera	5,775	18–17–3–2	41	Gamesheet
41	January 15	Abbotsford	4–3	Rockford	OT	LaBarbera	5,861	18–17–4–2	42	Gamesheet
42	January 18	Rockford	1–2	Chicago		LaBarbera	16,005	18–18–4–2	42	Gamesheet
43	January 20	Toronto	3–2	Rockford		LaBarbera	4,193	18–19–4–2	42	Gamesheet
44	January 24	Rockford	2–3	Milwaukee		Simpson	16,860	18–20–4–2	42	Gamesheet
45	January 25	Milwaukee	1–2	Rockford		LaBarbera	6,504	19–20–4–2	44	Gamesheet
46	January 26	Rockford	4–3	Milwaukee	OT	LaBarbera	4,045	20–20–4–2	46	Gamesheet
47	January 31	Rockford	1–4	Rochester		LaBarbera	6,311	20–21–4–2	46	Gamesheet

February: 9–0–1–1 (Home: 5–0–0–1; Road: 4–0–1–0) Pts. 20
#	Date	Visitor	Score	Home	OT	Decision	Attendance	Record	Pts	Gamesheet
48	February 1	Rockford	2–1	Utica		Simpson	3,815	21–21–4–2	48	Gamesheet
49	February 4	Hamilton	4–6	Rockford		LaBarbera	5,196	22–21–4–2	50	Gamesheet
50	February 8	Iowa	3–8	Rockford		Simpson	5,310	23–21–4–2	52	Gamesheet
51	February 9	Utica	4–5	Rockford	OT	LaBarbera	3,752	24–21–4–2	54	Gamesheet
52	February 14	Chicago	5–4	Rockford	SO	Simpson	4,468	24–21–4–3	55	Gamesheet
53	February 15	Rockford	5–3	Iowa		LaBarbera	10,115	25–21–4–3	57	Gamesheet
54	February 16	Rockford	4–2	Iowa		LaBarbera	6,814	26–21–4–3	59	Gamesheet
55	February 21	Chicago	1–2	Rockford		LaBarbera	6,007	27–21–4–3	61	Gamesheet
56	February 22	Milwaukee	1–4	Rockford		LaBarbera	6,265	28–21–4–3	63	Gamesheet
57	February 25	Rockford	4–1	Iowa		LaBarbera	4,102	29–21–4–3	65	Gamesheet
58	February 28	Rockford	4–5	Oklahoma City	OT	LaBarbera	3,853	29–21–5–3	66	Gamesheet

March: 4–5–0–1 (Home: 4–1–0–0; Road: 0–4–0–1) Pts. 9
#	Date	Visitor	Score	Home	OT	Decision	Attendance	Record	Pts	Gamesheet
59	March 1	Rockford	4–5	Oklahoma City		LaBarbera	3,158	29–22–5–3	66	Gamesheet
60	March 4	Rochester	2–4	Rockford		LaBarbera	3,071	30–22–5–3	68	Gamesheet
61	March 7	Rockford	3–8	Milwaukee		Simpson	4,431	30–23–5–3	68	Gamesheet
62	March 8	Milwaukee	6–2	Rockford		LaBarbera	6,300	30–24–5–3	68	Gamesheet
63	March 14	Rockford	5–6	Milwaukee	SO	LaBarbera	6,394	30–24–5–4	69	Gamesheet
64	March 21	Rockford	0–6	Chicago		Simpson	8,825	30–25–5–4	69	Gamesheet
65	March 22	Chicago	1–2	Rockford	SO	LaBarbera	6,513	31–25–5–4	71	Gamesheet
66	March 28	Grand Rapids	4–5	Rockford		LaBarbera	5,223	32–25–5–4	73	Gamesheet
67	March 29	Rockford	1–4	Grand Rapids		LaBarbera	10,834	32–26–5–4	73	Gamesheet
68	March 30	Chicago	3–6	Rockford		Simpson	5,925	33–26–5–4	75	Gamesheet

April: 2–6–0–0 (Home: 2–2–0–0; Road: 0–4–0–0) Pts. 4
#	Date	Visitor	Score	Home	OT	Decision	Attendance	Record	Pts	Gamesheet
69	April 4	Rockford	3–6	Abbotsford		LaBarbera	3,088	33–27–5–4	75	Gamesheet
70	April 5	Rockford	3–5	Abbotsford		LaBarbera	3,276	33–28–5–4	75	Gamesheet
71	April 8	Rockford	1–3	Milwaukee		LaBarbera	3,504	33–29–5–4	75	Gamesheet
72	April 11	Milwaukee	4–1	Rockford		LaBarbera	4,283	33–30–5–4	75	Gamesheet
73	April 12	Iowa	2–3	Rockford		LaBarbera	6,524	34–30–5–4	77	Gamesheet
74	April 13	Rockford	2–4	Chicago		LaBarbera	11,535	34–31–5–4	77	Gamesheet
75	April 18	Chicago	5–3	Rockford		LaBarbera	5,368	34–32–5–4	77	Gamesheet
76	April 19	Charlotte	3–7	Rockford		LaBarbera	5,300	35–32–5–4	79	Gamesheet

Legend: Win (2 points) Loss (0 points) Overtime/shootout loss (1 point)

== Player statistics ==
=== Skaters ===
Note: GP = Games played; G = Goals; A = Assists; Pts = Points; +/− = Plus/minus; PIM = Penalty minutes
Updated as of November 4, 2013

Regular season
Player	GP	G	A	Pts	+/-	PIM
Adam Clendening	74	12	47	59	4	64
Alex Broadhurst^{*}	75	16	29	45	1	32
Mark McNeill^{*}	76	18	19	37	2	46
Jeremy Morin^{‡}	47	24	23	47	1	58
Jimmy Hayes	13	4	4	8	−4	2
Klas Dahlbeck	76	10	25	35	1	49
Terry Broadhurst	73	16	28	44	0	16
Drew LeBlanc^{*}	76	7	15	22	−5	18
Phillip Danault^{*}	72	6	20	26	3	40
Dylan Olsen	16	0	8	8	5	8
Bradley Mills^{‡}	28	8	6	14	−3	49
Garret Ross^{*}	74	15	19	34	3	78
Brad Winchester	55	16	14	30	−2	85
Brandon Pirri^{‡}	26	11	15	26	0	10
Viktor Svedberg	35	2	7	9	−3	26
Byron Froese	28	0	5	5	−1	14
Maxim Shalunov^{*}	20	0	4	4	−1	8
Joe Gleason^{*}	7	0	1	1	−1	2
Pat Mullane^{*}	46	6	7	13	−2	15
Kyle Beach	7	4	0	4	0	10
Bobby Shea	29	3	4	7	0	84
Wade Brookbank	27	0	1	1	0	30
Joakim Nordstrom^{‡}	58	17	16	33	−3	21
Theo Peckham^{‡}	45	0	6	6	−1	100
Jared Nightingale^{‡}	67	1	3	4	−6	114
Brandon Mashinter^{†}	47	14	14	28	−6	79

^{†}Denotes player spent time with another team before joining team. Stats reflect time with the team only.
^{‡}Left the team mid-season
^{*}Rookie

=== Goaltenders ===
Note: GP = Games played; TOI = Time on ice; W = Wins; L = Losses; GA = Goals against; GAA = Goals against average; SV = Saves; SA = Shots against; SV% = Save percentage; SO = Shutouts; G = Goals; A = Assists; PIM = Penalty minutes
Updated as of November 4, 2013

Regular season
Player	GP	TOI	W	L	GA	GAA	SV	SA	SV%	SO	G	A	PIM
Antti Raanta^{*}	9	493:20	5	3	22	2.68	249	271	.919	0	0	0	0
Kent Simpson^{*}	5	294:01	2	3	16	3.27	174	190	.916	0	0	0	0
Totals		787:21	7	4	31	2.36	423	461	.918	0	0	0	0

^{‡}Left the team mid-season
^{*}Rookie

== Milestones ==
Player	Milestone	Reached
Antti Raanta	1st AHL Game	October 5, 2013
Joe Gleason	1st AHL Game	October 5, 2013
Pat Mullane	1st AHL Game	October 5, 2013
Viktor Svedberg	1st AHL Goal	October 5, 2013
Alex Broadhurst	1st AHL Game; 1st AHL Goal	October 5, 2013
Mark McNeill	1st AHL Assist; 1st AHL Goal	October 6, 2013
Phillip Danault	1st AHL Assist	October 6, 2013
Antti Raanta	1st AHL Win	October 11, 2013
Joakim Nordström	1st AHL Goal	October 11, 2013
Drew LeBlanc	1st AHL Goal	October 11, 2013
Viktor Svedberg	1st AHL Goal	October 11, 2013
Alex Broadhurst	1st AHL Assist	October 11, 2013
Maxim Shalunov	1st AHL Game	October 12, 2013
Drew LeBlanc	1st AHL Assist	October 12, 2013
Phillip Danault	1st AHL Goal	October 19, 2013
Garret Ross	1st AHL Goal	October 22, 2013
Pat Mullane	1st AHL Assist	October 22, 2013
Garret Ross	1st AHL Assist	October 23, 2013
