= Patrick Sieloff =

American ice hockey player

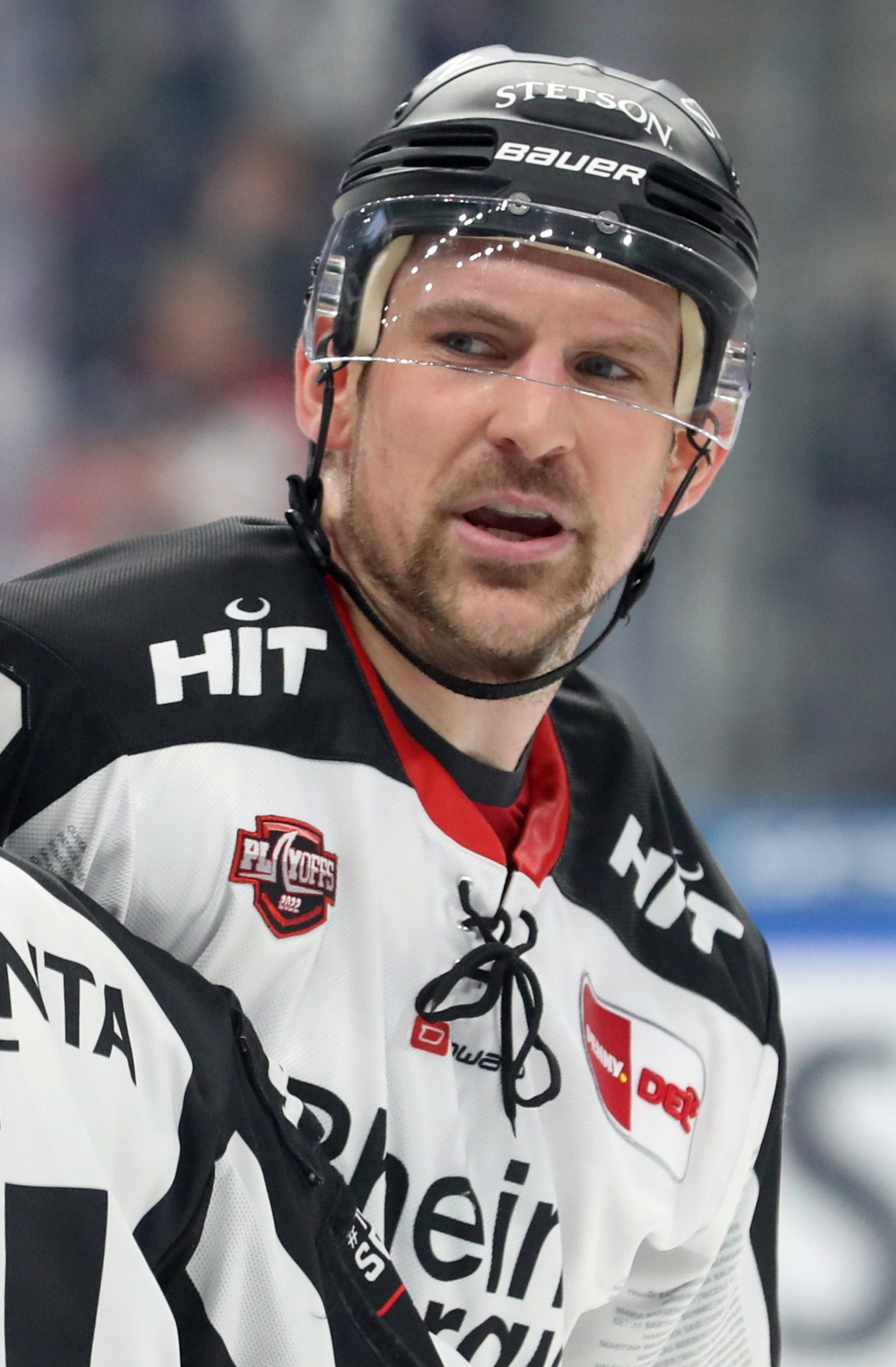
- Sieloff with the Kölner Haie in 2022
- Born: May 15, 1994 (age 32) Ann Arbor, Michigan, U.S.
- Height: 6 ft 1 in (185 cm)
- Weight: 201 lb (91 kg; 14 st 5 lb)
- Position: Defence
- Shoots: Left
- team Former teams: Free agent Abbotsford Heat; Adirondack Flames; Stockton Heat; Calgary Flames; Ottawa Senators; Binghamton Senators; Belleville Senators; San Diego Gulls; Hartford Wolf Pack; San Jose Barracuda; Kölner Haie
- NHL draft: 42nd overall, 2012; Calgary Flames
- Playing career: 2013–present

Patrick Sieloff (born May 15, 1994) is an American professional ice hockey defenceman currently a free agent. He was selected by the Calgary Flames in the second round (42nd overall) of the 2012 NHL entry draft. He has also played for the Ottawa Senators.

== Playing career ==
As a youth, Sieloff played in the 2007 Quebec International Pee-Wee Hockey Tournament with the Detroit Compuware minor ice hockey team.

=== Major junior ===
Sieloff was drafted by the Sault Ste. Marie Greyhounds in the sixth round of the 2010 OHL draft. On November 2, 2011, while playing for the US National Team Development Program, Sieloff's OHL rights were traded to the Windsor Spitfires, along with Mackenzie Braid, and six draft picks, in exchange for goaltender Jack Campbell. Despite being offered a hockey scholarship to play for the Miami RedHawks at Miami University, Sieloff chose to play for the Windsor Spitfires in the Ontario Hockey League on May 27, 2012.

=== Professional ===
Sieloff was drafted in the second round, 42nd overall, by the Calgary Flames in the 2012 NHL entry draft. On July 19, 2013, the Flames signed Sieloff to a three-year two-way contract. On April 9, 2016, Sieloff scored his first NHL goal in his first NHL game, which also turned out to be the game-winning goal, on Darcy Kuemper of the Minnesota Wild in a 2–1 victory.

On June 27, 2016, Sieloff was traded by the Flames to the Ottawa Senators in exchange for Alex Chiasson. On September 25, 2016, Sieloff hit fellow Senator Clarke MacArthur hard during a training camp scrimmage at the team's annual Fan Fest in an incident that left MacArthur with a concussion. Bobby Ryan immediately dropped his gloves and went after Sieloff, and on his next shift Chris Neil also attempted to get retribution. Sieloff was subsequently removed from the game as a precaution. He was then sent down to the AHL and did not receive a call-up that season. MacArthur, who had a history of concussions before the incident, would only play 23 more NHL games in his career following the hit. Despite the incident, he signed a one-year, two-way contract with the Senators in the summer before the 2017–18 season began. He received his first call up on March 20, 2018, to play in a game against the Florida Panthers. In his debut, he scored a goal in the 7–2 loss, becoming the first player in NHL history to score a goal in their debut for two different teams. He was reassigned to the AHL on March 21, 2018. Following being named Belleville's defenceman of the year, Sieloff signed a two-year, two-way contract with the Senators.

Before the 2018–19 season, Sieloff was named an alternate captain for the Belleville Senators along with Paul Carey and Ben Sexton. He ranked third in appearances on the blueline for Belleville, posting 9 points in 45 games, before he was traded by the Senators to the Anaheim Ducks in exchange for Brian Gibbons on February 25, 2019. Assigned to report directly to the San Diego Gulls of the AHL, Sieloff completed the regular season with 1 assist in 14 appearances. He made his AHL playoff debut with the Gulls, going scoreless in 3 games.

In his final year under contract with the Ducks, Sieloff continued his tenure with the Gulls in the 2019–20 season. He registered just 1 goal in 19 games with San Diego before the Ducks traded him to the Tampa Bay Lightning in exchange for Chris Mueller on December 31, 2019.

As a free agent leading into the pandemic-delayed 2020–21 season, Sieloff was added to the Hartford Wolf Pack roster of the AHL on February 2, 2021. Remaining with the team for the remainder of the shortened season, Sieloff made 22 appearances collecting 1 goal and 3 points from the blueline.

Having spent his first 8 professional seasons in the AHL and North America, Sieloff as a free agent signed his first contract abroad, by agreeing to a one-year contract with German club, Kölner Haie of the DEL, on September 7, 2021.

In October 2022, he signed a one-year deal with the San Jose Barracuda of the AHL.

In January 2024, Sieloff returned to Kölner Haie on a one-year deal.

== International play ==
Sieloff won a gold medal with Team USA at the 2013 IIHF World U20 Championship.

== Career statistics ==
=== Regular season and playoffs ===
			Regular season					Playoffs
Season	Team	League	GP	G	A	Pts	PIM	GP	G	A	Pts	PIM
2010–11	U.S. NTDP Juniors	USHL	36	1	3	4	66	2	0	0	0	2
2010–11	U.S. NTDP U17	USDP	52	3	6	9	76	—	—	—	—	—
2010–11	U.S. NTDP U18	USDP	1	0	0	0	0	—	—	—	—	—
2011–12	U.S. NTDP Juniors	USHL	24	0	2	2	55	—	—	—	—	—
2011–12	U.S. NTDP U18	USDP	60	3	7	10	113	—	—	—	—	—
2012–13	Windsor Spitfires	OHL	45	3	8	11	85	—	—	—	—	—
2013–14	Abbotsford Heat	AHL	2	0	0	0	0	—	—	—	—	—
2014–15	Adirondack Flames	AHL	48	2	3	5	78	—	—	—	—	—
2015–16	Stockton Heat	AHL	52	2	9	11	54	—	—	—	—	—
2015–16	Calgary Flames	NHL	1	1	0	1	2	—	—	—	—	—
2016–17	Binghamton Senators	AHL	52	2	10	12	93	—	—	—	—	—
2017–18	Belleville Senators	AHL	58	1	9	10	108	—	—	—	—	—
2017–18	Ottawa Senators	NHL	1	1	0	1	0	—	—	—	—	—
2018–19	Belleville Senators	AHL	45	1	8	9	73	—	—	—	—	—
2018–19	San Diego Gulls	AHL	14	0	1	1	8	3	0	0	0	0
2019–20	San Diego Gulls	AHL	19	1	0	1	16	—	—	—	—	—
2019–20	Syracuse Crunch	AHL	13	1	4	5	6	—	—	—	—	—
2020–21	Hartford Wolf Pack	AHL	22	1	2	3	37	—	—	—	—	—
2021–22	Kölner Haie	DEL	42	1	9	10	53	5	0	0	0	44
2022–23	San Jose Barracuda	AHL	71	1	13	14	77	—	—	—	—	—
2023–24	Kölner Haie	DEL	14	0	5	5	29	3	0	0	0	27
NHL totals			2	2	0	2	2	—	—	—	—	—

=== International ===
Year	Team	Event	Result	GP	G	A	Pts	PIM
2011	United States	U17	2nd place, silver medalist(s)	5	0	1	1	2
2012	United States	U18	1st place, gold medalist(s)	6	0	0	0	0
2013	United States	WJC	1st place, gold medalist(s)	6	0	1	1	2
Junior totals				17	0	2	2	4
