= Chris Breen =

Canadian ice hockey player (born 1989)

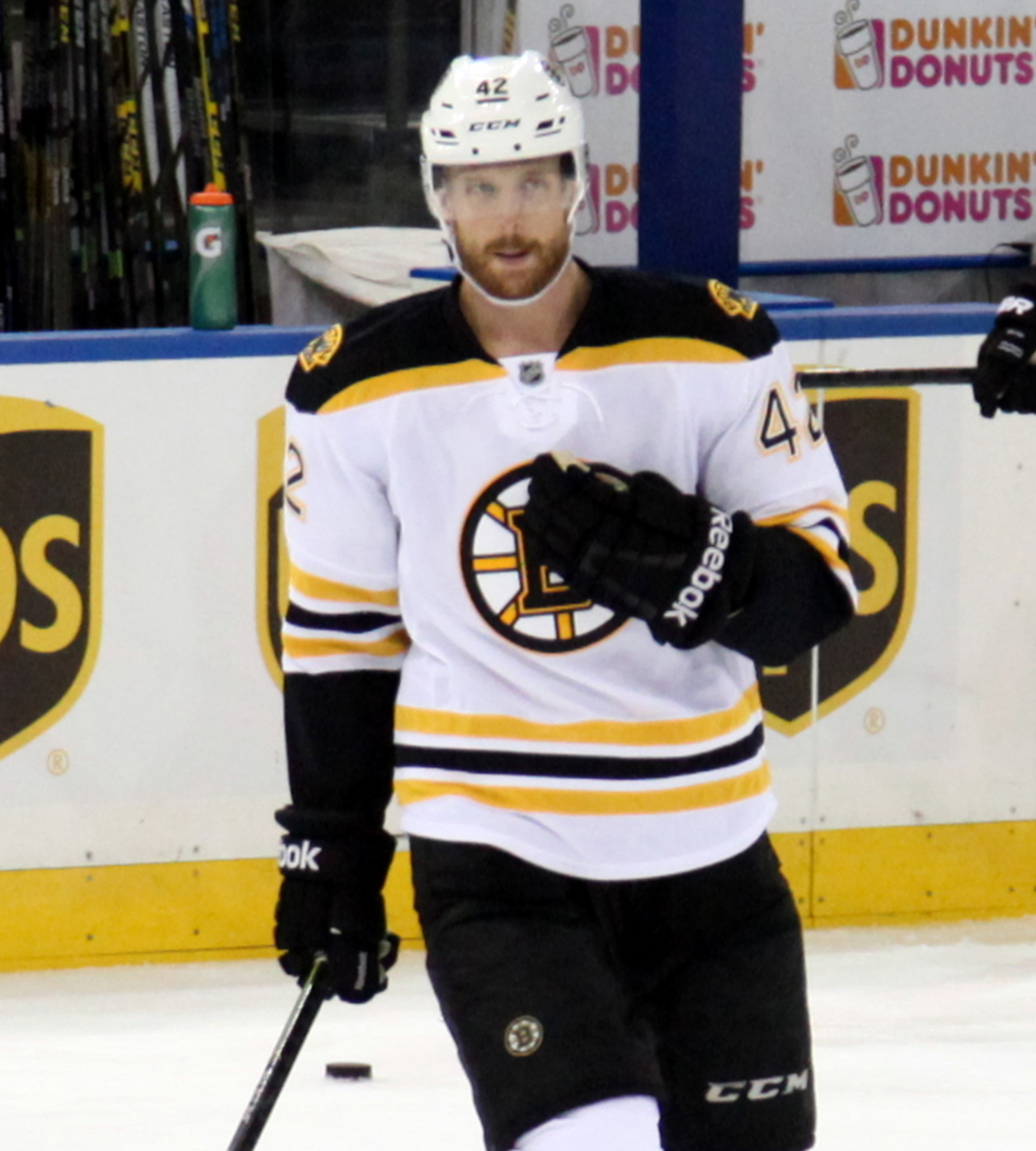
- Breen with the Boston Bruins in a 2015 pre-season game
- Born: June 29, 1989 (age 37) Uxbridge, Ontario, Canada
- Height: 6 ft 7 in (201 cm)
- Weight: 224 lb (102 kg; 16 st 0 lb)
- Position: Defence
- Shot: Left
- Played for: Calgary Flames
- NHL draft: Undrafted
- Playing career: 2010–2020

Chris Breen (born June 29, 1989) is a Canadian former professional ice hockey defenceman. An undrafted player, Breen originally joined the Calgary Flames organization in 2010 and made his NHL debut with the team in 2013. He was later signed by the Boston Bruins as a free agent on July 1, 2014.

== Playing career ==
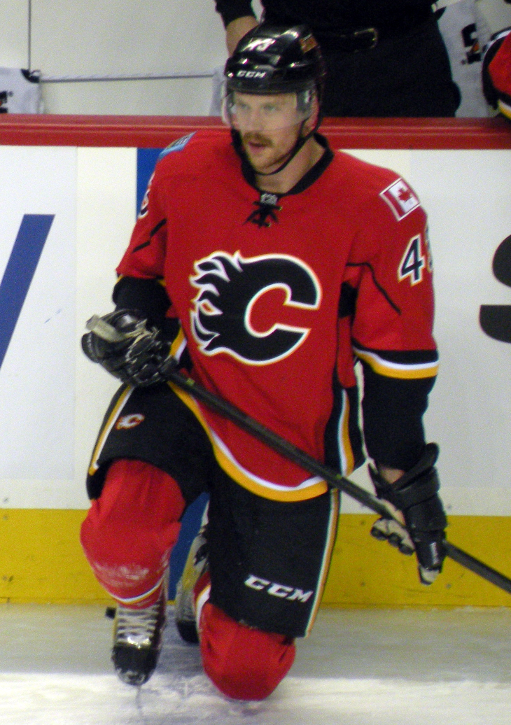
Breen with the Flames in 2013

Breen played five Ontario Hockey League (OHL) seasons between 2005 and 2010 with the Saginaw Spirit, Erie Otters and Peterborough Petes. A late-bloomer, he was not an OHL regular until his 18-year-old season and went unselected at the NHL entry draft. Noting his height – six feet, seven inches tall – the Calgary Flames took an interest in Breen and brought him to their American Hockey League (AHL) affiliate, the Abbotsford Heat, on a try-out when his junior season with Peterborough ended.

Though he played only one game at the end of the 2009–10 AHL season and recorded an assist, the Flames signed him to a contract. Assigned to the Heat for the 2010–11 season, Breen played 74 games, scored four goals and seven assists, and established himself as a prospect in the Flames organization. He spent the following two seasons in Abbotsford, scoring seven points in 70 games in 2011–12 and seven points in 60 games in 2012–13. Breen missed the last 11 games of the latter campaign after suffering a shoulder injury that required surgery to repair.

While recovered from the injury, the Flames signed Breen to a one-year, two-way contract extension for 2013–14. He began the season on a conditioning assignment with Abbotsford, but was recalled to the Flames on October 21, 2013. Breen made his NHL debut one night later in a 4–2 loss against the Phoenix Coyotes.

On July 1, 2014, Breen was signed as a free agent to a one-year two-way contract with the Boston Bruins. On July 2, 2015, Breen was re-signed by the Bruins to a one-year two-way contract. On July 6, 2016, Breen was re-signed by the Bruins to a one-year two-way contract.

During the 2017–18 season, while in his fourth season with the Providence Bruins, Breen was signed to a one-year, two-way NHL contract with parent club, Boston on February 25, 2018; he was then placed on waivers by the parent club and re-assigned to Providence. He completed the season, scoring 13 points in 62 games from the blueline.

On June 30, 2018, agreed to return for a fifth season with Providence, accepting another one-year AHL contract. In July 2019, after scoring 11 points in the 2018–19 AHL season and becoming the fifth longest tenured player for Providence up to that time, Breen signed what would prove to be his last, one-year, contract with Providence.

== Career statistics ==
			Regular season					Playoffs
Season	Team	League	GP	G	A	Pts	PIM	GP	G	A	Pts	PIM
2005–06	Mississauga Chargers	OPJHL	33	1	6	7	10	—	—	—	—	—
2005–06	Saginaw Spirit	OHL	25	0	0	0	10	—	—	—	—	—
2006–07	Saginaw Spirit	OHL	39	1	2	3	32	2	0	0	0	2
2007–08	Saginaw Spirit	OHL	55	0	6	6	67	4	0	1	1	0
2008–09	Saginaw Spirit	OHL	6	0	1	1	9	—	—	—	—	—
2008–09	Erie Otters	OHL	59	0	12	12	31	5	0	1	1	7
2009–10	Erie Otters	OHL	12	0	2	2	11	—	—	—	—	—
2009–10	Peterborough Petes	OHL	53	4	8	12	36	4	1	0	1	5
2009–10	Abbotsford Heat	AHL	1	0	1	1	4	—	—	—	—	—
2010–11	Abbotsford Heat	AHL	73	4	7	11	47	—	—	—	—	—
2011–12	Abbotsford Heat	AHL	70	1	6	7	37	8	1	0	1	0
2012–13	Abbotsford Heat	AHL	60	3	4	7	55	—	—	—	—	—
2013–14	Abbotsford Heat	AHL	41	1	3	4	29	4	0	2	2	2
2013–14	Calgary Flames	NHL	9	0	2	2	5	—	—	—	—	—
2014–15	Providence Bruins	AHL	52	2	8	10	33	5	0	1	1	0
2015–16	Providence Bruins	AHL	66	1	11	12	38	3	1	0	1	0
2016–17	Providence Bruins	AHL	37	1	2	3	38	17	0	3	3	6
2017–18	Providence Bruins	AHL	62	1	12	13	46	4	0	1	1	2
2018–19	Providence Bruins	AHL	47	2	9	11	38	4	1	0	1	7
2019–20	Providence Bruins	AHL	14	0	2	2	25	—	—	—	—	—
NHL totals			9	0	2	2	5	—	—	—	—	—
