= Peter Sivák =

Slovak ice hockey player (born 1982)

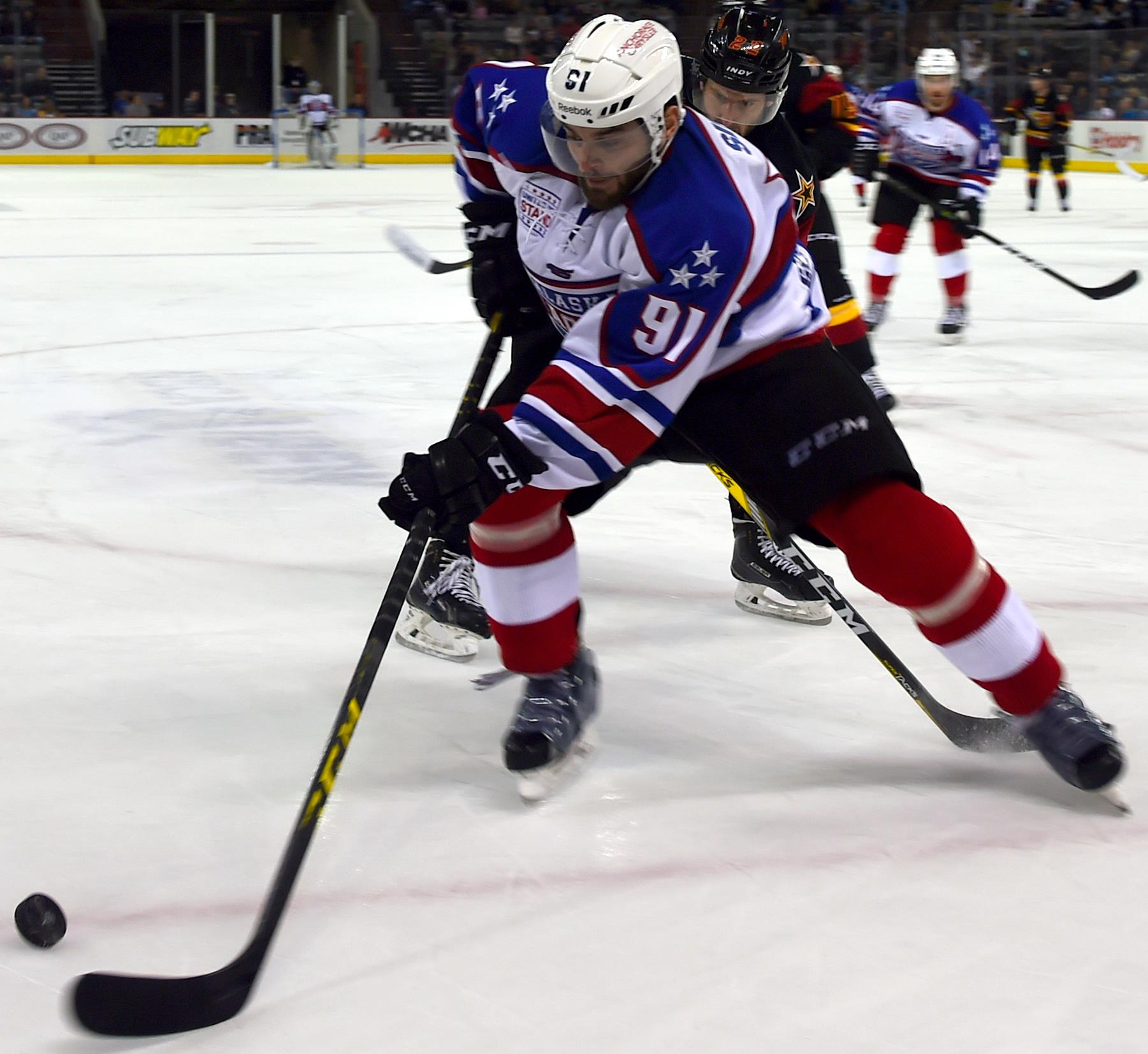
- Sivák with the Alaska Aces in 2016
- Born: 21 March 1982 (age 43) Cheb, Czechoslovakia
- Height: 5 ft 11 in (180 cm)
- Weight: 179 lb (81 kg; 12 st 11 lb)
- Position: Forward
- Shoots: Left
- ECHL team Former teams: Tulsa Oilers; HK 32 Liptovský Mikuláš; HK Dukla Trenčín; HK Dubnica; MsHK Žilina; HKm Zvolen; HC Zlín; Worcester Sharks; Abbotsford Heat; Bridgeport Sound Tigers; San Diego Gulls
- NHL draft: Undrafted
- Playing career: 2000–present

Peter Sivák (born 21 March 1982) is a Slovak professional ice hockey forward who played for the Tulsa Oilers of the ECHL. He previously played with HC Zlín in the Czech Extraliga during the 2010–11 Czech Extraliga season. He now coaches for the Vacaville Jets in Vacaville, California.

== Playing career ==
Sivák became the scorer of one of the fastest goals in hockey history. When playing for MsHK Žilina in the 2011–12 season of the 39th round of top slovak league against HK Poprad, he opened the scoring in the fifth second. The re-measurement of that time upon review through the video recording, showed that he scored in 3:23 seconds. The longer time he received in the game was apparently the human factor by stopping the clock later by timekeeper. The similar fast goal he scored in the same season in the playoffs in the quarterfinals against Slovan Bratislava where, in 4th game and in 2nd period, he scored the goal in the fifth second.

On 18 September 2013, he was signed as a free agent by the Alaska Aces of the ECHL. In the 2013–14 season, Sivak enjoyed a career best season in leading the Aces with 83 points in 67 games. He was selected to the ECHL's First All-Star Team and was recognized as the ECHL performer of the year in helping the Aces claim the Kelly Cup.

On 22 August 2014, the Bridgeport Sound Tigers of the AHL announced that they had signed Sivák as an unrestricted free agent to a one-year contract. In the 2014–15 season, Sivák was initially reassigned to the Stockton Thunder before he was recalled to feature in just 6 games with the Sound Tigers. He was later reassigned to the Orlando Solar Bears before his AHL rights were traded by the Sound Tigers to the Bears AHL affiliate, the Toronto Marlies on 20 February 2015. He remained with the Solar Bears to conclude the season with 20 points in 25 games.

On 15 July 2015, Sivák was signed as a free agent to remain in the ECHL, agreeing to a one-year contract with the Fort Wayne Komets. He opened the 2015-16 season, scoring 2 goals and 8 points in 10 games with the Komets before he was sidelined by injury. Upon his return to health, Sivák was traded by the Komets in a return to the Alaska Aces in exchange for Joe Perry on 3 December 2015.

With the Alaska Aces ceasing operations following the 2016–17 season, Sivak signed as a free agent to continue in the ECHL with the Utah Grizzlies on August 8, 2017.

== Career statistics ==
			Regular season					Playoffs
Season	Team	League	GP	G	A	Pts	PIM	GP	G	A	Pts	PIM
1999–00	HK 32 Liptovský Mikuláš	Slovak	1	0	0	0	0	—	—	—	—	—
2000–01	HK 32 Liptovský Mikuláš	Slovak	36	1	3	4	14	2	0	0	0	0
2001–02	HK Dukla Trenčín	Slovak	33	5	2	7	4					10
2002–03	HK Dukla Trenčín	Slovak	53	14	4	18	64	12	1	1	2	12
2003–04	HK Dukla Trenčín	Slovak	35	0	9	9	38	—	—	—	—	—
2004–05	HK Dubnica	Slovak	28	6	10	16	29	—	—	—	—	—
2004–05	ŠHK 37 Piešťany	Slovak.1	3	0	0	0	0	—	—	—	—	—
2004–05	HK Dukla Trenčín	Slovak	19	3	3	6	12	12	0	1	1	22
2005–06	HK Dukla Trenčín	Slovak	54	7	7	14	38	4	0	0	0	0
2006–07	HK Dukla Trenčín	Slovak	50	5	13	18	142	14	0	6	6	45
2006–07	HK 95 Považská Bystrica	Slovak.1	1	2	0	2	0	—	—	—	—	—
2007–08	MsHK Žilina	Slovak	52	27	21	48	71	4	1	0	1	4
2008–09	MsHK Žilina	Slovak	46	12	13	25	24	—	—	—	—	—
2008–09	HKm Zvolen	Slovak	8	4	2	6	6	13	2	4	6	26
2009–10	HC Zlín	Czech	52	2	11	13	57	6	0	0	0	0
2010–11	HC Zlín	Czech	45	2	7	9	35	4	0	0	0	2
2011–12	MsHK Žilina	Slovak	55	21	30	51	70	5	1	2	3	8
2012–13	San Francisco Bulls	ECHL	64	33	23	56	28	3	1	2	3	2
2012–13	Worcester Sharks	AHL	9	4	1	5	4	—	—	—	—	—
2013–14	Alaska Aces	ECHL	67	31	52	83	10	10	5	4	9	0
2013–14	Abbotsford Heat	AHL	3	0	0	0	2	—	—	—	—	—
2014–15	Stockton Thunder	ECHL	29	10	16	26	16	—	—	—	—	—
2014–15	Bridgeport Sound Tigers	AHL	6	1	0	1	2	—	—	—	—	—
2014–15	Orlando Solar Bears	ECHL	25	5	15	20	8	—	—	—	—	—
2015–16	Fort Wayne Komets	ECHL	10	2	6	8	4	—	—	—	—	—
2015–16	Alaska Aces	ECHL	51	20	35	55	31	—	—	—	—	—
2016–17	Alaska Aces	ECHL	53	35	30	65	26	—	—	—	—	—
2017–18	Utah Grizzlies	ECHL	4	0	1	1	2	—	—	—	—	—
2017–18	Rapid City Rush	ECHL	58	26	34	60	30	—	—	—	—	—
AHL totals			18	5	1	6	8	—	—	—	—	—

== Awards and honours ==
Award	Year
ECHL First All-Star Team	2013–14
ECHL Performer of the Year	2013–14
ECHL Sportsmanship Award	2013–14
Kelly Cup (Alaska Aces)	2013–14
