= Kane Lafranchise =

Canadian ice hockey player (born 1988)

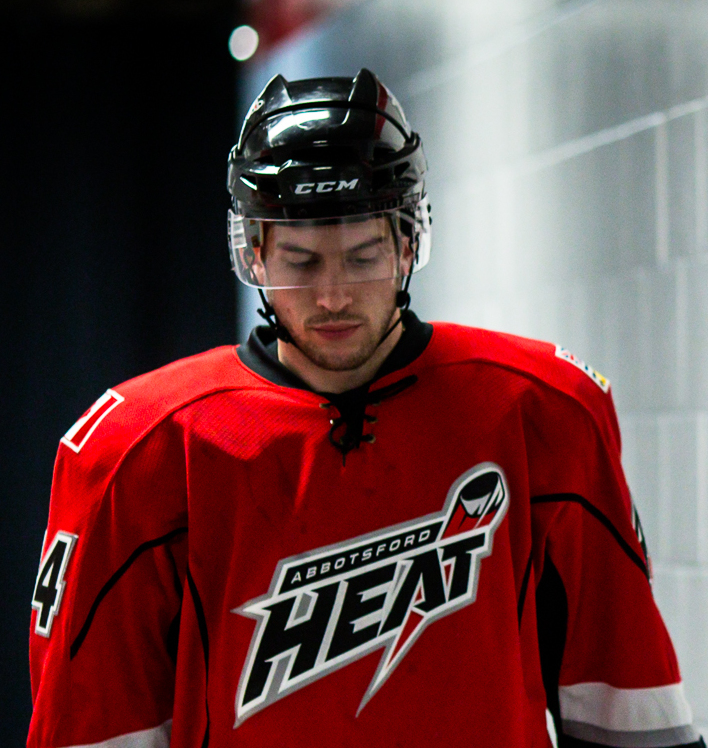
- Lafranchise with the Abbotsford Heat in 2014
- Born: May 27, 1988 (age 38) Edmonton, Alberta, Canada
- Height: 6 ft 1 in (185 cm)
- Weight: 196 lb (89 kg; 14 st 0 lb)
- Position: Defence
- Shot: Left
- Played for: Oklahoma City Barons; Houston Aeros; Abbotsford Heat; Utica Comets; Bridgeport Sound Tigers
- NHL draft: Undrafted
- Playing career: 2011–2018

Kane Lafranchise (born May 27, 1988) is a Canadian former professional ice hockey defenceman.

== Playing career ==
Lafranchise played NCAA college hockey with the Alaska Anchorage Seawolves men's ice hockey team. On February 11, 2011, the Alaska Aces of the ECHL signed Lafranchise to his first professional contract. On July 11, 2014, Lafranchise secured a one-year American Hockey League (AHL) contract with the Utica Comets.

On July 2, 2015, Lafranchise continued his career in the AHL, signing a one-year deal with the Bridgeport Sound Tigers, affiliate of the New York Islanders of the National Hockey League (NHL). In his second campaign with the Sound Tigers in 2016–17 season, he played his first full year in the AHL, setting career best marks with 5 goals, 16 assists and 21 points in 67 games.

On July 2, 2017, he was rewarded by signing his first NHL contract, in agreeing to a one-year, two-way deal with the Islanders.

On September 10, 2018, Lafranchise announced his retirement.

== Personal life ==
Lafranchise was the winner of the 2012 The Hockey News "Name of the Year Tournament", with voters giving his name the edge over Boston Bruins' draft pick, Wacey Rabbit.

== Career statistics ==
			Regular season					Playoffs
Season	Team	League	GP	G	A	Pts	PIM	GP	G	A	Pts	PIM
2003–04	Edmonton Canadians	AMHL	35	6	9	15	12	—	—	—	—	—
2004–05	Edmonton Canadians	AMHL	31	6	14	20	50	—	—	—	—	—
2004–05	Spruce Grove Saints	AJHL	1	0	0	0	0	—	—	—	—	—
2005–06	Spruce Grove Saints	AJHL	60	7	13	20	16	—	—	—	—	—
2006–07	Spruce Grove Saints	AJHL	58	12	23	35	55	10	1	3	4	0
2007–08	U. of Alaska-Anchorage	WCHA	33	3	5	8	8	—	—	—	—	—
2008–09	U. of Alaska-Anchorage	WCHA	31	3	7	10	25	—	—	—	—	—
2009–10	U. of Alaska-Anchorage	WCHA	33	3	12	15	30	—	—	—	—	—
2010–11	Alaska Aces	ECHL	22	0	5	5	6	—	—	—	—	—
2011–12	Alaska Aces	ECHL	69	3	31	34	20	10	1	4	5	4
2012–13	Alaska Aces	ECHL	52	5	28	33	18	11	0	6	6	2
2012–13	Oklahoma City Barons	AHL	9	0	0	0	0	—	—	—	—	—
2012–13	Houston Aeros	AHL	1	0	0	0	0	—	—	—	—	—
2013–14	Abbotsford Heat	AHL	34	0	13	13	2	4	1	0	1	2
2013–14	Alaska Aces	ECHL	14	3	3	6	6	15	1	10	11	4
2014–15	Utica Comets	AHL	27	2	8	10	4	—	—	—	—	—
2014–15	Kalamazoo Wings	ECHL	24	0	16	16	0	4	0	2	2	0
2015–16	Missouri Mavericks	ECHL	37	4	13	17	12	—	—	—	—	—
2015–16	Bridgeport Sound Tigers	AHL	33	1	14	15	6	3	0	1	1	2
2016–17	Bridgeport Sound Tigers	AHL	67	5	16	21	28	—	—	—	—	—
2017–18	Bridgeport Sound Tigers	AHL	64	2	16	18	14	—	—	—	—	—
AHL totals			235	10	67	77	54	7	1	1	2	4
