= Brett Olson (ice hockey) =

American professional ice hockey centre (born 1987)

- Born: February 19, 1987 (age 39) Duluth, Minnesota, U.S.
- Height: 6 ft 0 in (183 cm)
- Weight: 185 lb (84 kg; 13 st 3 lb)
- Position: Centre
- Shot: Right
- Played for: Abbotsford Heat; San Antonio Rampage; Portland Pirates; EC Red Bull Salzburg; ERC Ingolstadt; Krefeld Pinguine; Düsseldorfer EG
- NHL draft: Undrafted
- Playing career: 2012–2022

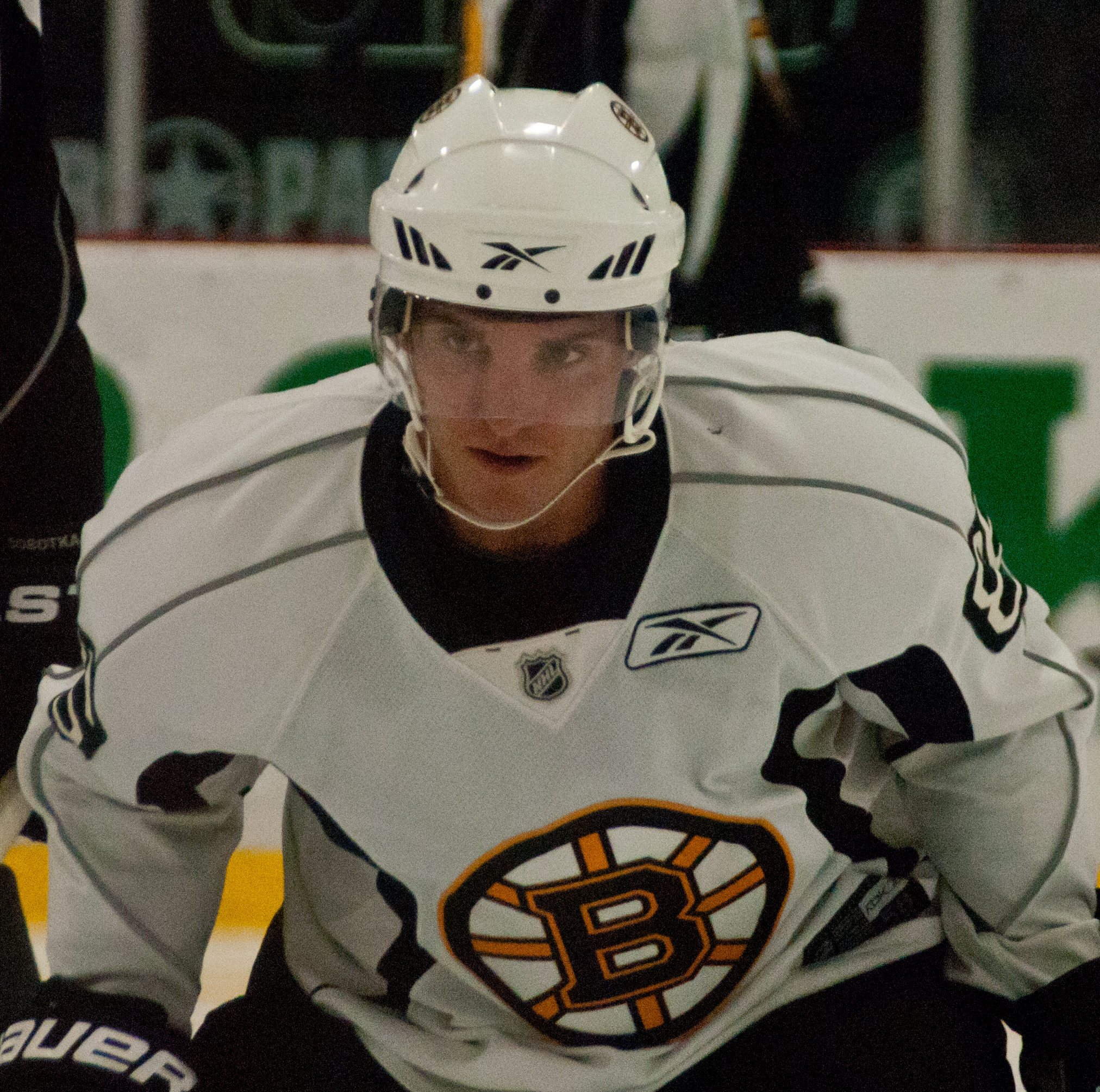
Brett Olson during the Boston Bruins 2011 Development Camp

Brett Olson (born February 19, 1987) is an American former professional ice hockey centre. He most notably played in the American Hockey League (AHL) and the Deutsche Eishockey Liga (DEL).

== Playing career ==
=== College ===
Prior to turning professional, Olson attended the Michigan Technological University where he played four seasons (2008–12) of NCAA Division I hockey with the Michigan Tech Huskies, where he registered 42 goals, 51 assists, 93 points, and 156 penalty minutes, in 127 games. Olson was named to the WCHA All-Academic team in both 2011 and 2012, and served as captain during his senior year.

=== Professional ===
Following his graduation, Olson played professional hockey in the American Hockey League (AHL) with the Abbotsford Heat for the 2012–13 and 2013–14 AHL seasons.

On July 4, 2014, the Florida Panthers of the National Hockey League (NHL) signed Olson to a one-year, two-way contract, and he played the 2014–15 season with the Panthers' AHL affiliate, the San Antonio Rampage.

On May 28, 2015, the Florida Panthers re-signed Olson to another one-year contract. Olsen suffered a dip in production with new Panthers' AHL affiliate, the Portland Pirates during the 2015–16 season. In 67 games, he contributed with 13 goals and 26 points.

As a free agent from the Panthers in the off-season, Olson left North America, signing a one-year deal with reigning Austrian champions, EC Red Bull Salzburg of the EBEL on July 15, 2016. Olson demonstrated his versatility throughout the 2016-17 season with Salzburg, scoring 38 points in 39 games while playing in all situations defensively with the club.

On May 28, 2017, Olson opted to sign in the Neighbouring DEL, agreeing to a one-year deal with German club, ERC Ingolstadt. On February 3, Olson scored the goal of the month by batting the puck out of mid-air from his defensive zone into the opposing team's net in the game against the Grizzly Adams Wolfsburg.

Olson played three seasons in Ingolstadt before leaving as a free agent to sign a one-year contract with Krefeld Pinguine on December 2, 2020.

== Career statistics ==
			Regular season					Playoffs
Season	Team	League	GP	G	A	Pts	PIM	GP	G	A	Pts	PIM
2005–06	Sioux City Musketeers	USHL	6	0	1	1	4	—	—	—	—	—
2005–06	Waterloo Black Hawks	USHL	44	5	9	14	14	—	—	—	—	—
2006–07	Waterloo Black Hawks	USHL	52	9	13	22	82	9	3	4	7	4
2007–08	Waterloo Black Hawks	USHL	49	17	37	54	50	11	3	7	10	10
2008–09	Michigan Tech	WCHA	38	10	13	23	41	—	—	—	—	—
2009–10	Michigan Tech	WCHA	32	18	12	30	45	—	—	—	—	—
2010–11	Michigan Tech	WCHA	18	4	6	10	25	—	—	—	—	—
2011–12	Michigan Tech	WCHA	39	10	20	30	45	—	—	—	—	—
2012–13	Abbotsford Heat	AHL	70	8	10	18	31	—	—	—	—	—
2013–14	Abbotsford Heat	AHL	75	17	27	44	38	4	1	0	1	2
2014–15	San Antonio Rampage	AHL	76	14	31	45	58	3	0	1	1	0
2015–16	Portland Pirates	AHL	67	13	13	26	20	5	1	1	2	0
2016–17	EC Red Bull Salzburg	EBEL	39	11	27	38	18	11	3	3	6	2
2017–18	ERC Ingolstadt	DEL	44	13	9	22	34	4	1	0	1	37
2018–19	ERC Ingolstadt	DEL	47	9	12	21	41	7	2	4	6	2
2019–20	ERC Ingolstadt	DEL	51	12	24	36	32	—	—	—	—	—
2020–21	Krefeld Pinguine	DEL	34	11	11	22	18	—	—	—	—	—
2021–22	Düsseldorfer EG	DEL	39	8	6	14	18	—	—	—	—	—
AHL totals			288	52	81	133	147	12	2	2	4	2
DEL totals			215	53	62	115	143	11	3	4	7	39

== Awards and honors ==
Award	Year
College
WCHA All-Academic Team	2010–11
WCHA All-Academic Team	2011–12
