= Jordan Kremyr =

Canadian ice hockey player (born 1986)

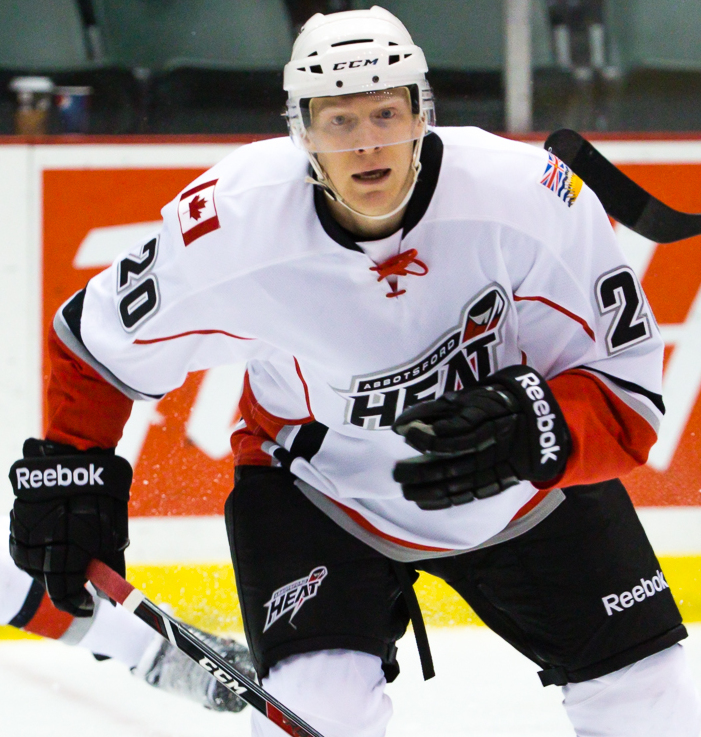
- Kremyr with the Abbotsford Heat in 2014
- Born: July 7, 1986 (age 39) Cloverdale, British Columbia, Canada
- Height: 5 ft 11 in (180 cm)
- Weight: 183 lb (83 kg; 13 st 1 lb)
- Position: Left wing
- Shot: Left
- ECHL team Former teams: Tulsa Oilers; Abbotsford Heat
- NHL draft: Undrafted
- Playing career: 2011–2016

Jordan Kremyr (born July 7, 1986) is a Canadian former professional ice hockey forward who last played for the Tulsa Oilers of the ECHL.

== Playing career ==
Kremyr attended Providence College where he played four seasons (2007–2011) of NCAA hockey with the Providence Friars, scoring 13 goals and 14 assists for 27 points, while earning 53 penalty minutes, in 104 games played.

On March 17, 2011, Kremyr signed a try-out agreement with the Alaska Aces of the ECHL, and stayed with the team through the next two seasons. On August 9, 2013, the Aces re-signed Kremyr to continue his play for the 2013–14 ECHL season. On October 25, 2013, Kremyr was named an alternate captain for the 2013–14 season. Helping the club claim its third Kelly Cup in franchise history. Kremyr also managed to make his American Hockey League debut with affiliate, the Abbotsford Heat, contributing 1 goal in 16 games.

On August 27, 2014, Kremyr left the Aces organization after parts of four seasons, to sign a one-year contract with ECHL club, the Bakersfield Condors, an affiliate of the Edmonton Oilers

On August 19, 2015, Kremyr continued within the Oilers affiliations, in agreeing to a one-year deal with new ECHL entrants the Norfolk Admirals. On October 15, 2015, Kremyr was traded before appearing with the Admirals to the Tulsa Oilers to begin the 2015–16 season.

== Career statistics ==
			Regular season					Playoffs
Season	Team	League	GP	G	A	Pts	PIM	GP	G	A	Pts	PIM
2003–04	Chilliwack Chiefs	BCHL	4	1	0	1	4	3	0	0	0	12
2004–05	Chilliwack Chiefs	BCHL	15	3	8	11	10	—	—	—	—	—
2004–05	Alberni Valley Bulldogs	BCHL	45	16	23	39	58	9	0	1	1	4
2005–06	Alberni Valley Bulldogs	BCHL	60	34	37	71	35	10	5	8	13	0
2006–07	Alberni Valley Bulldogs	BCHL	60	29	46	75	50	5	0	2	2	9
2007–08	Providence College	H-East	32	3	1	4	27	—	—	—	—	—
2008–09	Providence College	H-East	17	1	3	4	2	—	—	—	—	—
2009–10	Providence College	H-East	23	2	7	9	4	—	—	—	—	—
2010–11	Providence College	H-East	32	7	3	10	20	—	—	—	—	—
2010–11	Alaska Aces	ECHL	1	0	0	0	0	—	—	—	—	—
2011–12	Alaska Aces	ECHL	52	14	10	24	50	10	1	0	1	7
2012–13	Alaska Aces	ECHL	45	4	14	18	20	—	—	—	—	—
2013–14	Alaska Aces	ECHL	36	10	4	14	30	—	—	—	—	—
2013–14	Abbotsford Heat	AHL	16	1	0	1	6	—	—	—	—	—
2014–15	Bakersfield Condors	ECHL	57	13	11	24	51	—	—	—	—	—
2015–16	Tulsa Oilers	ECHL	36	5	10	15	15	—	—	—	—	—
ECHL totals			227	46	49	95	166	10	1	0	1	7
AHL totals			16	1	0	1	6	—	—	—	—	—
