= Turner Elson =

Canadian professional ice hockey forward

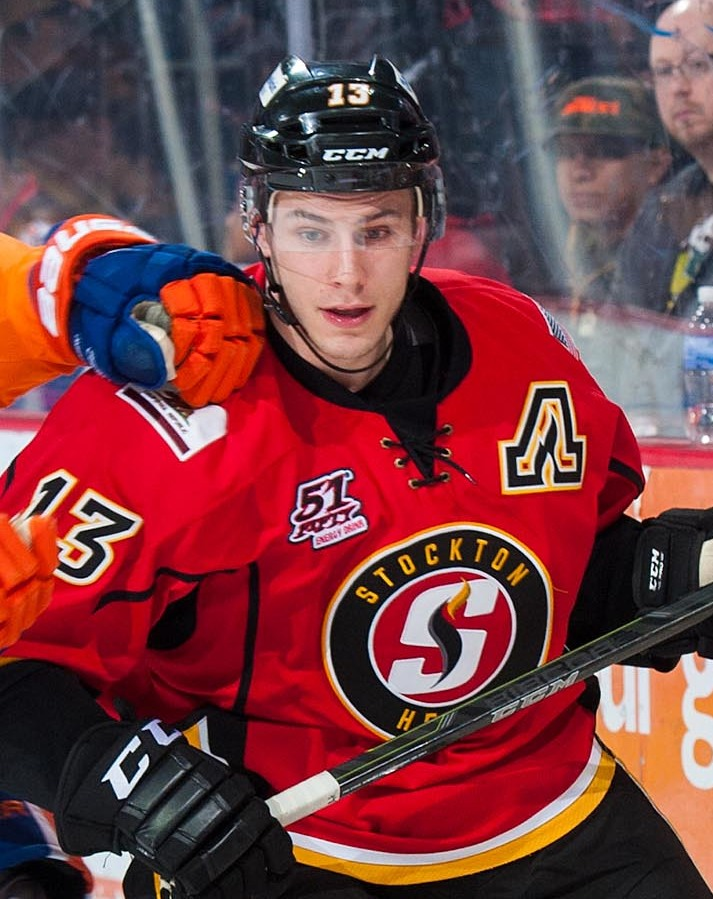
- Elson with the Stockton Heat
- Born: September 13, 1992 (age 33) New Westminster, British Columbia, Canada
- Height: 6 ft 0 in (183 cm)
- Weight: 195 lb (88 kg; 13 st 13 lb)
- Position: Centre
- Shoots: Left
- Slovak extraliga team Former teams: HC Slovan Bratislava; Calgary Flames; Detroit Red Wings; HC Škoda Plzeň
- NHL draft: Undrafted
- Playing career: 2012–present

Turner Elson (born September 13, 1992) is a Canadian professional ice hockey forward who currently plays for HC Slovan Bratislava in the Slovak Extraliga. He most recently played for HC Škoda Plzeň of the Czech Extraliga. Undrafted, he has previously played in the NHL with the Calgary Flames and Detroit Red Wings.

== Playing career ==
An undrafted player, Elson played junior ice hockey with the Red Deer Rebels of the Western Hockey League (WHL) and joined the Flames organization as a free agent signing in 2011.

Elson spent the majority of his first four professional seasons in the American Hockey League (AHL) with the Abbotsford Heat, Adirondack Flames and Stockton Heat. He was recalled to Calgary for the team's final game of the 2015–16 NHL season and made his NHL debut on April 9, 2016. Elson recorded his first NHL point, an assist, in the 2–1 victory over the Minnesota Wild.

At the conclusion of the season and at the end of his entry-level contract, Elson was not qualified by the Flames and was released as a free agent. On July 1, 2016, he signed a one-year, two-way contract to join the Colorado Avalanche. During the 2016–17 season, after attending the Avalanche training camp he was reassigned to AHL affiliate, the San Antonio Rampage. His season was quickly derailed as he was injured after just four games with a lower-body injury. He returned in the final stretches of the season registering three points in just 13 games.

On June 26, 2017, Elson again a restricted free agent, was not tendered a qualifying contract by the Colorado Avalanche, thus ending his one-year tenure with club in releasing him to free agency. On July 1, 2017, Elson signed a one-year contract with the Detroit Red Wings. On September 25, 2017, Elson was assigned to the Red Wings' AHL affiliate, the Grand Rapids Griffins.

During the 2017–18 season, Elson registered nine goals and 12 assists in 57 games for the Griffins. On June 18, 2018, Elson signed a one-year contract extension with the Griffins.

In the 2018–19 season, Elson regained his scoring touch with the Griffins. Having eclipsed his previous seasons totals, and while placing fourth in team scoring, Elson was signed mid-season to a two-year contract by the Red Wings on February 5, 2019.

Establishing himself as a valued veteran presence with the Grand Rapids Griffins, Elson was re-signed to return for a fourth season with the club, agreeing to a one-year, two-way contract extension with the Red Wings on September 27, 2020.

On July 30, 2021, Elson signed a one-year AHL contract with the Grand Rapids Griffins. In the 2021–22 season, Elson placed fourth in team scoring in contributing career-best marks with 21 goals and 24 assists for 45 points through 73 games. Unable to help the Griffins qualify for the post-season, Elson was signed for the remainder of the 2021–22 season to a contract with the Detroit Red Wings on April 25, 2022.

As a free agent from the Red Wings, Elson was signed to a two-year, two-way contract with the New York Rangers on July 15, 2022.

On March 8, 2024, the Rangers traded Elson to the Minnesota Wild in exchange for Nic Petan.

On October 26, 2024, Elson signed a one-year contract with HC Plzeň of the Czech Extraliga.

== Career statistics ==
			Regular season					Playoffs
Season	Team	League	GP	G	A	Pts	PIM	GP	G	A	Pts	PIM
2009–10	Red Deer Rebels	WHL	66	9	8	17	94	4	0	0	0	4
2010–11	Red Deer Rebels	WHL	68	16	15	31	124	9	0	4	4	23
2011–12	Red Deer Rebels	WHL	56	21	25	46	59	—	—	—	—	—
2011–12	Abbotsford Heat	AHL	1	0	0	0	2	—	—	—	—	—
2012–13	Red Deer Rebels	WHL	64	26	31	57	60	9	5	4	9	6
2012–13	Abbotsford Heat	AHL	2	0	0	0	0	—	—	—	—	—
2013–14	Abbotsford Heat	AHL	37	2	1	3	19	—	—	—	—	—
2013–14	Alaska Aces	ECHL	18	5	10	15	18	21	7	4	11	16
2014–15	Adirondack Flames	AHL	59	17	13	30	52	—	—	—	—	—
2015–16	Stockton Heat	AHL	63	14	16	30	59	—	—	—	—	—
2015–16	Calgary Flames	NHL	1	0	1	1	0	—	—	—	—	—
2016–17	San Antonio Rampage	AHL	13	1	2	3	12	—	—	—	—	—
2017–18	Grand Rapids Griffins	AHL	57	9	12	21	49	5	2	0	2	0
2018–19	Grand Rapids Griffins	AHL	72	18	21	39	80	5	2	2	4	0
2019–20	Grand Rapids Griffins	AHL	61	9	13	22	45	—	—	—	—	—
2020–21	Grand Rapids Griffins	AHL	31	4	13	17	24	—	—	—	—	—
2021–22	Grand Rapids Griffins	AHL	73	21	24	45	30	—	—	—	—	—
2021–22	Detroit Red Wings	NHL	2	0	0	0	0	—	—	—	—	—
2022–23	Hartford Wolf Pack	AHL	72	17	24	41	38	9	2	4	6	8
2023–24	Hartford Wolf Pack	AHL	38	5	7	12	23	—	—	—	—	—
2023–24	Iowa Wild	AHL	17	4	7	11	8	—	—	—	—	—
NHL totals			3	0	1	1	0	—	—	—	—	—
