= Dean Arsene =

Canadian ice hockey player (born 1980)

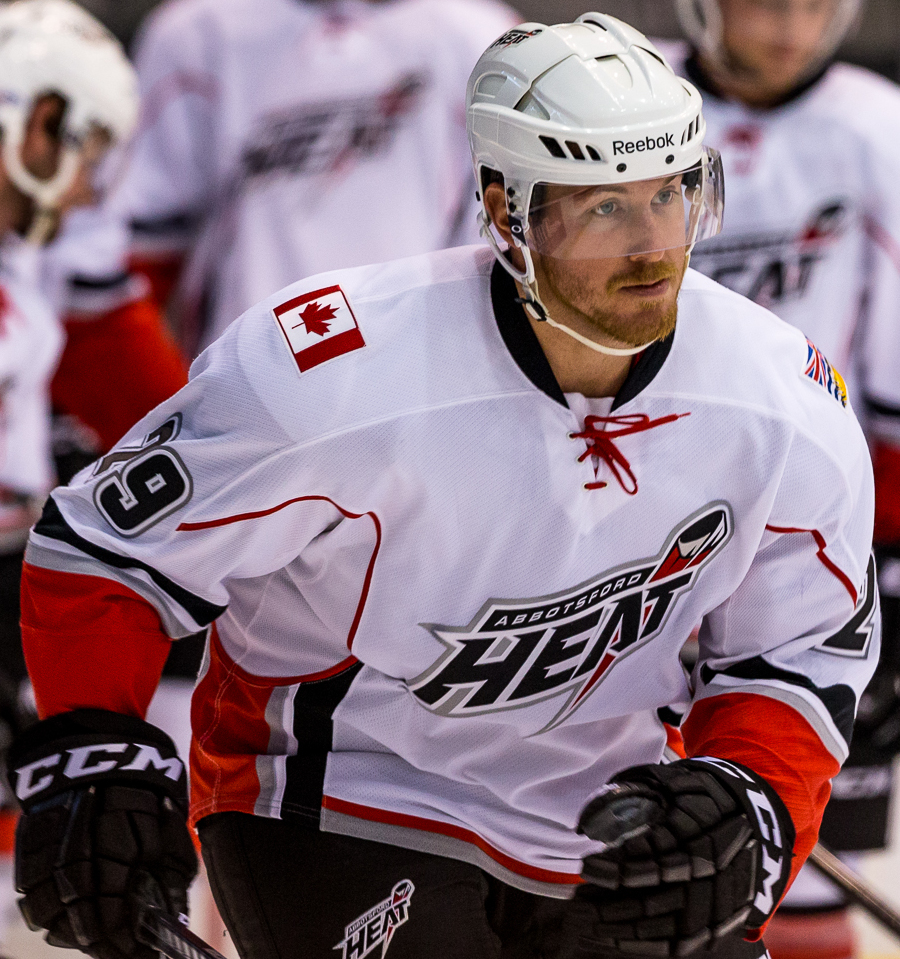
- Arsene with the Abbotsford Heat in 2013
- Born: July 20, 1980 (age 46) Murrayville, British Columbia, Canada
- Height: 6 ft 2 in (188 cm)
- Weight: 195 lb (88 kg; 13 st 13 lb)
- Position: Defence
- Shot: Left
- Played for: Edmonton Oilers
- NHL draft: Undrafted
- Playing career: 2001–2014

Dean Arsene (born July 20, 1980) is a Canadian former professional ice hockey defenceman. While he played the majority of his AHL career with the Hershey Bears, he last played with the Abbotsford Heat of the American Hockey League (AHL). He played 13 games in the National Hockey League (NHL) with the Edmonton Oilers.

== Playing career ==
To date, Arsene's professional career has been almost solely in the American Hockey League, where he has played twelve seasons. He spent six of those seasons (from 2003–04 to 2008–09) with the Hershey Bears, winning the league's championship Calder Cup twice in that tenure, and earning the fond nickname "Mayor of Chocolatetown."

Following his second Calder Cup, Arsene chose to sign a two-way contract with the Edmonton Oilers in the hope of earning some playing time in the NHL on July 16, 2009. That hope was realized when he was called up for a two-game stint in late 2009. He spent the majority of the 2009–10 season as the captain of the Springfield Falcons, however, he was again later recalled on an emergency basis on March 22, 2010, finishing out the season with Edmonton.

On August 11, 2010, Arsene signed as a free agent to a one-year, two-way contract with the St. Louis Blues.

Arsene signed a one-year contract with the Phoenix Coyotes on July 6, 2011. He spent the entirety of the 2011–12 season with the AHL affiliate, the Portland Pirates.

On August 9, 2012, Arsene agreed to a one-year American League contract with the St. John's IceCaps.

In his final professional season, Arsene returned home, signing a one-year contract with the Abbotsford Heat for the 2013–14 campaign. Arsene posted 7 points in 42 games before announcing his retirement upon the Heat's first-round exit in the playoffs on May 7, 2014.

== Career statistics ==
			Regular season					Playoffs
Season	Team	League	GP	G	A	Pts	PIM	GP	G	A	Pts	PIM
1996–97	Regina Pats	WHL	62	0	8	8	53	3	0	0	0	2
1997–98	Regina Pats	WHL	31	2	7	9	47	—	—	—	—	—
1997–98	Edmonton Ice	WHL	43	0	12	12	90	—	—	—	—	—
1998–99	Kootenay Ice	WHL	68	1	4	5	111	4	0	0	0	4
1999–00	Kootenay Ice	WHL	66	4	7	11	150	21	1	2	3	59
2000–01	Kootenay Ice	WHL	68	1	10	11	178	11	0	1	1	14
2001–02	Charlotte Checkers	ECHL	63	3	10	13	101	—	—	—	—	—
2002–03	Hartford Wolf Pack	AHL	50	1	3	4	94	—	—	—	—	—
2003–04	Reading Royals	ECHL	46	0	6	6	118	15	1	5	6	34
2003–04	Hershey Bears	AHL	22	0	2	2	44	—	—	—	—	—
2004–05	Hershey Bears	AHL	56	1	5	6	140	—	—	—	—	—
2005–06	Hershey Bears	AHL	68	2	5	7	181	21	0	1	1	29
2006–07	Hershey Bears	AHL	61	3	12	15	187	6	0	2	2	8
2007–08	Hershey Bears	AHL	14	0	2	2	23	—	—	—	—	—
2008–09	Hershey Bears	AHL	46	1	10	11	99	22	0	2	2	14
2009–10	Springfield Falcons	AHL	56	2	9	11	100	—	—	—	—	—
2009–10	Edmonton Oilers	NHL	13	0	0	0	41	—	—	—	—	—
2010–11	Peoria Rivermen	AHL	77	1	10	11	137	4	0	0	0	6
2011–12	Portland Pirates	AHL	63	2	8	10	110	—	—	—	—	—
2012–13	St. John's IceCaps	AHL	69	1	10	11	98	—	—	—	—	—
2013–14	Abbotsford Heat	AHL	42	1	6	7	43	3	0	0	0	18
NHL totals			13	0	0	0	41	—	—	—	—	—
