= 2013–14 Charlotte Checkers season =

2013–14 Charlotte Checkers
- Division: 4th West Division
- Conference: 11th Western Conference
- 2013–14 record: 37–36–1–2 (77 pts)
- Home record: 19–18–1–0
- Road record: 18–18–0–2
- Goals for: 228
- Goals against: 241

Team information
- General manager: Jeff Daniels
- Coach: Jeff Daniels
- Assistant coach: Geordie Kinnear
- Arena: Time Warner Cable Arena

Team leaders
- Goals: Zach Boychuk (36)
- Assists: Chris Terry (41)
- Points: Zach Boychuk (74)
- Penalty minutes: Matthew Corrente (136)
- Plus/minus: (+) Matthew Corrente (+9) (−) Mark Flood (−26)
- Wins: John Muse (27)
- Goals against average: Allen York (0.94)

The 2013–14 Charlotte Checkers season is the franchise's fourth season in the American Hockey League, which began on October 4, 2013.

== Off season ==
Charlotte remained in the same division after an American Hockey League realignment in the summer of 2013, but it was renamed from the South Division to the West Division. The Checkers unveiled new uniforms for the 2013–14 season, preserving the team's logo and its red, black and white colors, but making several design changes including the removal of a hurricane warning flag strip, new fonts for the letters and numbers, and a greater distinction between the home red and away white uniforms. Mark Binetti, who had been Charlotte's assistant broadcaster, departed from the team to work for the Central Hockey League's Rapid City Rush. The Checkers underwent several roster changes in the off season, retaining only two skaters who finished in the team's top ten in scoring from the previous year: forwards Chris Terry and Zach Boychuk. As a result, coach Jeff Daniels said the team would have to focus more on crashing the net and scoring "dirty goals".

Some of the team's departures included forwards Zac Dalpe, Jeremy Welsh, David Marshall, Riley Nash, David Rutherford, and Tim Wallace; and defensemen Brett Bellemore, Danny Biega, Ryan Murphy, and Bobby Sanguinetti. Former team captain Brett Sutter, Charlotte's second-leading scorer the previous season, was recalled to the Carolina Hurricanes, although he would be returned to the Checkers by November. Center Manny Malhotra joined the Checkers roster, marking his return from a one-year absence due to a left eye injury. Other Charlotte newcomers included forwards Adam Brace, and Aaron Palushaj; and defensemen Matt Corrente, Mark Flood, and Keegan Lowe. After starting their training camp on September 23, Charlotte split a home-and-home preseason series against the Norfolk Admirals on September 27 and 28. Palushaj scored two goals, including the final empty netter in a 4–2 victory in the first game.

2013–14 Preseason Game Log: 1–1–0–0 (Home: 0–1–0–0; Road: 1–0–0–0)

#	Date	Visitor	Score	Home	OT	Decision	Record
1	September 27	Norfolk	2–4	Charlotte		Peters	1–0–0–0
2	September 28	Charlotte	3–4	Norfolk		Murphy	1–1–0–0

== Regular season ==
=== October ===
The Checkers had only two home games in October, the lowest to start the season for any team in the league. But they also went their first five away games without a regulation loss, and never trailed in any of them. The Checkers started the season with two 3–2 victories against the Oklahoma City Barons on October 4 and 5, scoring the first two goals in both games. Terry scored the Charlotte's first goal of the season just 49 seconds into the season opener. After a two-week layoff, the Checkers lose two straight home games against the Iowa Wild on October 19 and 20, including a 7–2 loss in the latter game, where the Wild scored within the first 44 seconds. Charlotte would next play six away games in nine nights, none in consecutive locations, which marked their longest road trip in team history in term of consecutive days out of town. But they also saw a great deal of turnover in their goaltenders due to Mike Murphy and Justin Peters being recalled by the Carolina Hurricanes to fill in for the injured Cam Ward and Anton Khudobin. The Checkers would end up using five goalies in their first six games of the season. They signed professional tryout contracts to goaltenders Allen York, and Rick DiPietro, the 32-year-old veteran the New York Islanders released in July with a compliance buyout. Hurricane general manager Jim Rutherford called DiPietro's signing a "safety net" to provide more goaltending depth in light of their recent injuries.

John Muse made his first start of the season on October 25, stopping all 30 shots he faced in a 5–0 victory over the Grand Rapids Griffins. Boychuk, Flood and Terry each scored power play goals. The Checkers maintained a 110-minute shutout streak that ended against the Rockford IceHogs on October 26, which ended in a 2–1 loss after York allowed two of five shootout shots in his Charlotte debut. The Checkers secured another 5–0 win the next day against the Chicago Wolves, with Muse perfect for in second straight start, earning him the designation of AHL Player of the Week. Charlotte also scored three power play goals for the second time in three games, this time from Terry, Justin Shugg and Brody Sutter. The Checkers saw their first away loss in regulation on October 30, falling 5–2 to Grand Rapids, with DiPietro stopping 25 of 29 shots in his team debut. They defeated Rockford the next day, however, with Rask scoring two goals in a 5–3 victory. Holm scored at least one point in all nine games of the month, the best point streak of his career.

=== November ===
The Checkers fell into a five-game losing slump, tying a team record for consecutive losses. It started with a 5–3 loss to the San Antonio Rampage in which Charlotte surrendered a lead after allowing three goals in the third period, marking the first time they lost after leading at the second intermission. DiPietro's 37 saves were the most by a Checkers goalie since Rob Madore's 43 saves against the Texas Stars on April 12, 2013. Terry, who lead the team in goals for the season with six, in shots with 35, was recalled on November 6 by the Carolina Hurricanes, who in turn sent down 18-year-old rookie forward Elias Lindholm, the fifth overall pick in the 2013 NHL entry draft. Charlotte next lost a pair of games each against both the Chicago Wolves and the Hershey Bears, including an 8–1 loss against the Bears on November 14 that Daniels described as "pretty much rock bottom". The seven-goal deficit marked a franchise worst in any regular season. The game marked the Checkers' sixth straight home loss, marking their longest home losing streak in franchise history, and the longest such streak of any team in the league in the season thus far.

== Schedule and results ==
2013–14 Game Log – Regular season

October: 5–3–0–1 (Home: 0–2–0–0; Road: 5–1–0–1)
#	Date	Visitor	Score	Home	OT	Decision	Attendance	Record	Pts	Gamesheet
1	October 4	Charlotte	3–2	Oklahoma City		Peters	3,008	1–0–0–0	2	Gamesheet
2	October 5	Charlotte	3–2	Oklahoma City		Murphy	2,682	2–0–0–0	4	Gamesheet
3	October 19	Iowa	3–1	Charlotte		Murphy	9,021	2–1–0–0	4	Gamesheet
4	October 20	Iowa	7–2	Charlotte		Murphy	3,687	2–2–0–0	4	Gamesheet
5	October 25	Charlotte	5–0	Grand Rapids		Muse	5,494	3–2–0–0	6	Gamesheet
6	October 26	Charlotte	1–2	Rockford	SO	York	3,124	3–2–0–1	7	Gamesheet
7	October 27	Charlotte	5–0	Chicago		Muse	2,932	4–2–0–1	9	Gamesheet
8	October 30	Charlotte	2–5	Grand Rapids		DiPietro	2,974	4–3–0–1	9	Gamesheet
9	October 31	Charlotte	5–2	Rockford		Muse	5,936	5–3–0–1	11	Gamesheet

November: 2–9–0–0 (Home: 2–5–0–0; Road: 0–4–0–0)
#	Date	Visitor	Score	Home	OT	Decision	Attendance	Record	Pts	Gamesheet
10	November 2	Charlotte	3–5	San Antonio		DiPietro	6,359	5–4–0–1	11	Gamesheet
11	November 7	Chicago	2–1	Charlotte		Muse	4,328	5–5–0–1	11	Gamesheet
12	November 9	Chicago	2–1	Charlotte		Muse	8,033	5–6–0–1	11	Gamesheet
13	November 13	Hershey	5–3	Charlotte		DiPietro	3,878	5–7–0–1	11	Gamesheet
14	November 14	Hershey	8–1	Charlotte		Muse	5,451	5–8–0–1	11	Gamesheet
15	November 16	Charlotte	1–4	Toronto		Muse	7,699	5–9–0–1	11	Gamesheet
16	November 19	Charlotte	2–3	Toronto		Muse	4,402	5–10–0–1	11	Gamesheet
17	November 23	Rockford	2–5	Charlotte		Muse	7,672	6–10–0–1	13	Gamesheet
18	November 24	Rockford	4–3	Charlotte		DiPietro	4,343	6–11–0–1	13	Gamesheet
19	November 27	Charlotte	2–5	Norfolk		Muse	3,016	6–12–0–1	13	Gamesheet
20	November 30	Milwaukee	1–4	Charlotte		Muse	6,522	7–12–0–1	15	Gamesheet

December: 7–5–0–0 (Home: 5–4–0–0; Road: 2–1–0–0)
#	Date	Visitor	Score	Home	OT	Decision	Attendance	Record	Pts	Gamesheet
21	December 1	Milwaukee	2–1	Charlotte		Madore	3,303	7–13–0–1	15	Gamesheet
22	December 5	Rockford	2–3	Charlotte	OT	Muse	3,826	8–13–0–1	17	Gamesheet
23	December 7	Rockford	5–3	Charlotte		Murphy	7,719	8–14–0–1	17	Gamesheet
24	December 10	San Antonio	1–2	Charlotte		Muse	3,393	9–14–0–1	19	Gamesheet
25	December 12	San Antonio	2–3	Charlotte		Muse	3,918	10–14–0–1	21	Gamesheet
26	December 15	Norfolk	3–4	Charlotte	OT	Muse	4,322	11–14–0–1	23	Gamesheet
27	December 19	Norfolk	4–5	Charlotte		Muse	6,248	12–14–0–1	25	Gamesheet
28	December 20	Toronto	3–1	Charlotte		Murphy	6,816	12–15–0–1	25	Gamesheet
29	December 21	Toronto	5–2	Charlotte		Muse	6,217	12–16–0–1	25	Gamesheet
30	December 27	Charlotte	3–2	Milwaukee		Muse	7,076	13–16–0–1	27	Gamesheet
31	December 29	Charlotte	3–4	Chicago		Khudobin	7,120	13–17–0–1	27	Gamesheet
32	December 30	Charlotte	3–2	Rockford		Khudobin	4,599	14–17–0–1	29	Gamesheet

January: 7–3–0–0 (Home: 5–2–0–0; Road: 2–1–0–0)
#	Date	Visitor	Score	Home	OT	Decision	Attendance	Record	Pts	Gamesheet
33	January 2	Texas	5–3	Charlotte		Muse	5,677	14–18–0–1	29	Gamesheet
34	January 3	Texas	3–4	Charlotte		Murphy	6,698	15–18–0–1	31	Gamesheet
35	January 10	Charlotte	5–2	Oklahoma City		Murphy	2,967	16–18–0–1	33	Gamesheet
36	January 11	Charlotte	2–1	Oklahoma City		Muse	3,267	17–18–0–1	35	Gamesheet
37	January 17	Texas	7–1	Charlotte		Murphy	8,102	17–19–0–1	35	Gamesheet
38	January 18	Texas	1–6	Charlotte		Muse	7,323	18–19–0–1	37	Gamesheet
39	January 19	Norfolk	3–4	Charlotte	SO	Muse	6,784	19–19–0–1	39	Gamesheet
40	January 23	Oklahoma City	0–4	Charlotte		Muse	5,916	20–19–0–1	41	Gamesheet
41	January 24	Oklahoma City	3–9	Charlotte		Muse	8,160	21–19–0–1	43	Gamesheet
42	January 31	Charlotte	0–1	Lake Erie		Ward	9,215	21–20–0–1	43	Gamesheet

February: 3–6–1–1 (Home: 2–2–1–0; Road: 1–4–0–1)
#	Date	Visitor	Score	Home	OT	Decision	Attendance	Record	Pts	Gamesheet
43	February 1	Charlotte	5–3	Lake Erie		Ward	9,679	22–20–0–1	45	Gamesheet
44	February 4	Charlotte	1–7	Abbotsford		Muse	1,790	22–21–0–1	45	Gamesheet
45	February 5	Charlotte	3–4	Abbotsford		Murphy	1,528	22–22–0–1	45	Gamesheet
46	February 7	Oklahoma City	8–5	Charlotte		Muse	8,189	22–23–0–1	45	Gamesheet
47	February 9	Oklahoma City	4–3	Charlotte	OT	Murphy	8,168	22–23–1–1	46	Gamesheet
48	February 15	Abbotsford	5–1	Charlotte		Muse	4,354	22–24–1–1	46	Gamesheet
49	February 16	Abbotsford	4–5	Charlotte	OT	Murphy	5,525	23–24–1–1	48	Gamesheet
50	February 18	Norfolk	3–4	Charlotte		Muse	4,913	24–24–1–1	50	Gamesheet
51	February 21	Charlotte	1–4	Texas		Murphy	5,249	24–25–1–1	50	Gamesheet
52	February 22	Charlotte	2–3	Texas	SO	Peters	6,863	24–25–1–2	51	Gamesheet
53	February 26	Charlotte	2–3	Norfolk		Peters	3,066	24–26–1–2	51	Gamesheet

March: 12–4–0–0 (Home: 4–2–0–0; Road: 8–2–0–0)
#	Date	Visitor	Score	Home	OT	Decision	Attendance	Record	Pts	Gamesheet
54	March 1	Charlotte	4–1	Hershey		Peters	9,784	25–26–1–2	53	Gamesheet
55	March 2	Charlotte	6–3	Hershey		Peters	9,942	26–26–1–2	55	Gamesheet
56	March 4	Charlotte	3–2	Norfolk		Peters	2,526	27–26–1–2	57	Gamesheet
57	March 7	Charlotte	5–4	San Antonio	SO	Muse	8,473	28–26–1–2	59	Gamesheet
58	March 8	Charlotte	0–3	Texas		Murphy	5,469	28–27–1–2	59	Gamesheet
59	March 9	Charlotte	4–3	San Antonio		Muse	6,114	29–27–1–2	61	Gamesheet
60	March 12	Charlotte	3–1	Texas		Muse	4,910	30–27–1–2	63	Gamesheet
61	March 15	Lake Erie	2–5	Charlotte		Muse	8,002	31–27–1–2	65	Gamesheet
62	March 16	Lake Erie	3–2	Charlotte		Murphy	7,892	31–28–1–2	65	Gamesheet
63	March 19	Charlotte	3–5	Norfolk		Muse	3,072	31–29–1–2	65	Gamesheet
64	March 21	San Antonio	3–4	Charlotte		Muse	8,213	32–29–1–2	67	Gamesheet
65	March 23	San Antonio	4–2	Charlotte		Murphy	8,118	32–30–1–2	67	Gamesheet
66	March 25	Charlotte	2–1	Iowa		Muse	3,902	33–30–1–2	69	Gamesheet
67	March 26	Charlotte	7–0	Iowa		Muse	4,675	34–30–1–2	71	Gamesheet
68	March 29	Oklahoma City	2–3	Charlotte	SO	Muse	8,232	35–30–1–2	73	Gamesheet
69	March 30	Oklahoma City	4–5	Charlotte	SO	Muse	8,011	36–30–1–2	75	Gamesheet

April: 1–6–0–0 (Home: 1–1–0–0; Road: 0–5–0–0)
#	Date	Visitor	Score	Home	OT	Decision	Attendance	Record	Pts	Gamesheet
70	April 4	Charlotte	2–5	San Antonio		Muse	8,000	36–31–1–2	75	Gamesheet
71	April 5	Charlotte	0–1	Oklahoma City		Muse	3,957	36–32–1–2	75	Gamesheet
72	April 6	Charlotte	4–6	Oklahoma City		Muse	3,061	36–33–1–2	75	Gamesheet
73	April 10	Grand Rapids	0–3	Charlotte		Muse	6,709	37–33–1–2	77	Gamesheet
74	April 13	Grand Rapids	2–1	Charlotte		Muse	8,002	37–34–1–2	77	Gamesheet
75	April 18	Charlotte	1–5	Milwaukee		Muse	7,592	37–35–1–2	77	Gamesheet
76	April 19	Charlotte	3–7	Rockford		Muse	5,300	37–36–1–2	77	Gamesheet

Legend: Win (2 points) Loss (0 points) Overtime/shootout loss (1-point)

== Player statistics ==
=== Skaters ===
Note: GP = Games played; G = Goals; A = Assists; Pts = Points; +/− = Plus/minus; PIM = Penalty minutes

Regular season
Player	GP	G	A	Pts	+/-	PIM
Zach Boychuk	69	36	38	74	−7	55
Chris Terry	70	28	41	69	−13	62
Aaron Palushaj	68	22	36	58	−3	80
Brett Sutter	62	15	29	44	−13	69
Victor Rask^{*}	76	16	23	39	−3	20
Justin Shugg	75	16	22	38	−9	26
Mark Flood	74	13	18	31	−26	27
Philippe Cornet^{†}	58	13	15	28	−8	16
Brody Sutter	69	8	20	28	0	29
Michal Jordan	70	4	21	25	−12	20
Ryan Murphy^{*}	22	3	19	22	+7	8
Dan Biega^{*}	65	3	15	18	−6	22
Nicolas Blanchard	65	7	8	15	−7	111
Sean Dolan	50	5	10	15	−6	27
Matt Marquardt	61	6	7	13	−7	64
Keegan Lowe^{*}	63	2	10	12	−7	86
Matthew Pistilli^{‡}	21	4	7	11	+4	13
Greg Nemisz^{†}	14	3	8	11	+4	4
Matthew Corrente	72	2	9	11	+9	136
Rasmus Rissanen	62	3	7	10	−7	91
Brendan Woods^{*}	42	5	3	8	−7	40
Jared Staal	50	2	5	7	−2	23
Adam Brace^{*‡}	10	2	4	6	+1	2
Beau Schmitz	23	2	4	6	+1	12
AJ Jenks	24	2	3	5	−3	20
Elias Lindholm^{*}	6	1	2	3	−4	4
Austin Levi^{*}	10	1	0	1	−2	0
Phil Di Giuseppe^{*}	3	0	1	1	0	6
Dennis Robertson^{*}	1	0	0	0	0	0
Sergey Tolchinsky^{*}	1	0	0	0	−1	0
Kyle Bonis^{‡}	3	0	0	0	−2	0
Manny Malhotra^{‡}	8	0	0	0	−2	17

^{†}Denotes player spent time with another team before joining team. Stats reflect time with the team only.
^{‡}Left the team mid-season
^{*}Rookie

=== Goaltenders ===
Note: GP = Games played; TOI = Time on ice; W = Wins; L = Losses; GA = Goals against; GAA = Goals against average; SV = Saves; SA = Shots against; SV% = Save percentage; SO = Shutouts; G = Goals; A = Assists; PIM = Penalty minutes

Regular season
Player	GP	TOI	W	L	GA	GAA	SV	SA	SV%	SO	G	A	PIM
Allen York^{‡}	1	63:58	0	0	1	0.94	28	29	.966	0	0	0	0
Cam Ward	2	118:45	1	1	4	2.02	59	63	.937	0	0	0	0
Rob Madore^{‡}	1	58:32	0	1	2	2.05	25	27	.926	0	0	0	0
Justin Peters	6	363:51	4	1	13	2.14	177	190	.932	0	0	0	2
John Muse	47	2,656:57	27	18	121	2.73	1,305	1,426	.915	5	0	0	4
Anton Khudobin	2	118:48	1	1	6	3.03	77	83	.928	0	0	0	0
Mike Murphy	19	931:20	4	11	62	3.99	458	520	.881	0	0	0	0
Jesse Deckert^{*}	1	36:33	0	0	3	4.92	10	13	.769	0	0	0	0
Rick DiPietro	5	220:16	0	4	19	5.18	104	123	.846	0	0	0	2
Totals		4,601:00	37	37	231	3.01	2,243	2,474	.907	5	0	0	8

^{‡}Left the team mid-season
^{*}Rookie

== Awards and records ==
=== Awards ===
Player	Award	Awarded
John Muse	AHL Player of the Week	October 27, 2013

=== Milestones ===
Player	Milestone	Reached
Jesse Deckert	1st AHL Game	October 20, 2013
Adam Brace	1st AHL Goal	November 7, 2013
