= Jared Nightingale =

American former ice hockey player and coach (born 1982)

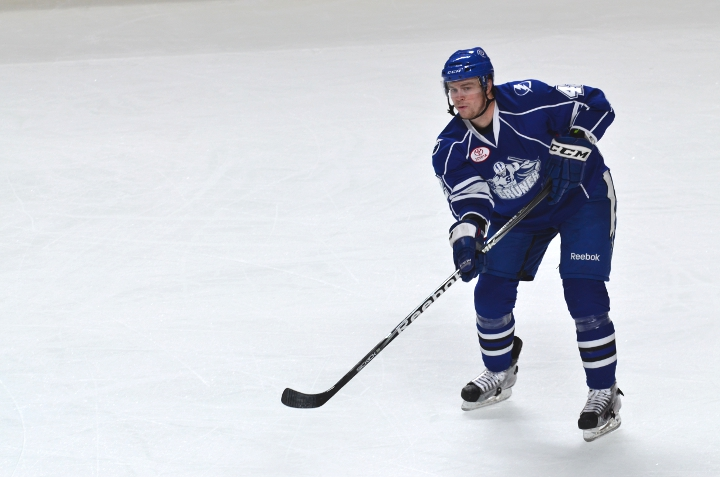
- Nightingale with the Syracuse Crunch in 2012
- Born: October 3, 1982 (age 43) Jackson, Michigan, U.S.
- Height: 6 ft 3 in (191 cm)
- Weight: 205 lb (93 kg; 14 st 9 lb)
- Position: Defense
- Shot: Right
- Played for: Springfield Falcons; Iowa Stars; Hartford Wolf Pack; Chicago Wolves; Connecticut Whale; Syracuse Crunch; Rockford IceHogs; Norfolk Admirals; Grand Rapids Griffins; Milwaukee Admirals
- NHL draft: Undrafted
- Playing career: 2006–2018

Jared Nightingale (born October 3, 1982) is an American former professional ice hockey defenseman who primarily played in the American Hockey League (AHL). He is the current Head Coach of the Rockford IceHogs of the AHL.

== Playing career ==
On January 30, 2009, Nightingale signed an AHL contract with the Hartford Wolf Pack. He was re-signed by Hartford on August 23, 2010. After five seasons with the affiliates of the New York Rangers organization, Nightingale was signed to an AHL contract with the Syracuse Crunch on July 5, 2012.

On July 22, 2013, Nightingale continued his journeyman career by signing a one-year contract with the Rockford IceHogs, an AHL affiliate of the Chicago Blackhawks.

On February 5, 2015, the Grand Rapids Griffins signed Nightingale to a professional try out. Nightingale recorded one assist in six games with the Hartford Wolf Pack, and one assist in 20 games with the Norfolk Admirals. Most recently he spent 13 games with the Toledo Walleye of the ECHL, where he recorded three points. On February 9, 2015, Nightingale was released from his professional try out, and returned to the Norfolk Admirals.

On August 26, 2015, the Toledo Walleye re-signed Nightingale to a one-year contract.

Following the conclusion of the 2016–17 season with the Chicago Wolves, and having appeared in 472 regular season AHL games, Nightingale announced his retirement from professional hockey on August 31, 2017.

In the 2017–18 season, Nightingale briefly came out of retirement, playing a solitary game with the Quad City Mallards of the ECHL on January 21, 2018, before returning to his assistant coaching role with the Omaha Lancers of the United States Hockey League.

== Coaching career ==
In 2017-18, Nightingale was an assistant coach for the Omaha Lancers of the USHL. In 2018-19, Nightingale served in the same role with the US National Development Team, also of the USHL. He was the associate coach of the Saginaw Spirit from 2019-21 and an Assistant with the Flint Firebirds in the 2021-22 season, both of the OHL. In 2022, Nightingale was named an assistant coach for the AHL's Rockford IceHogs, a position he held until being hired as the Head Coach of the ECHL's South Carolina Stingrays in 2024. In his one season at the helm, he led South Carolina to the playoffs with a 52-15-5 record, and won the ECHL coach of the year award. On May 30th 2025, Nightingale was named the new Head Coach of the Rockford IceHogs.

== Personal life ==
Nightingale's older brother, Adam, is the head coach for the Michigan State Spartans men's ice hockey team, while his other brother, Jason, is Assistant Director of Amateur Scouting for the Buffalo Sabres.

== Career statistics ==
| | | | Regular season | | | | | Playoffs |
| Season | Team | League | GP | G | A | Pts | PIM | GP | G | A | Pts | PIM |
|---|---|---|---|---|---|---|---|---|---|---|---|---|
| 1999–00 | Soo Indians | NAHL | 5 | 0 | 0 | 0 | 15 | — | — | — | — | — |
| 2000–01 | Soo Indians | NAHL | 49 | 2 | 13 | 15 | 108 | — | — | — | — | — |
| 2001–02 | Soo Indians | NAHL | 55 | 6 | 21 | 27 | 102 | — | — | — | — | — |
| 2002–03 | Michigan State University | CCHA | 38 | 1 | 3 | 4 | 42 | — | — | — | — | — |
| 2003–04 | Michigan State University | CCHA | 42 | 0 | 8 | 8 | 54 | — | — | — | — | — |
| 2004–05 | Michigan State University | CCHA | 35 | 0 | 4 | 4 | 39 | — | — | — | — | — |
| 2005–06 | Michigan State University | CCHA | 41 | 1 | 6 | 7 | 26 | — | — | — | — | — |
| 2005–06 | Springfield Falcons | AHL | 10 | 1 | 1 | 2 | 18 | — | — | — | — | — |
| 2006–07 | Idaho Steelheads | ECHL | 11 | 0 | 1 | 1 | 22 | — | — | — | — | — |
| 2006–07 | Iowa Stars | AHL | 9 | 2 | 0 | 2 | 4 | — | — | — | — | — |
| 2007–08 | Charlotte Checkers | ECHL | 65 | 3 | 11 | 14 | 196 | 3 | 0 | 0 | 0 | 8 |
| 2007–08 | Hartford Wolf Pack | AHL | 2 | 0 | 0 | 0 | 4 | — | — | — | — | — |
| 2007–08 | Chicago Wolves | AHL | 5 | 0 | 0 | 0 | 2 | — | — | — | — | — |
| 2008–09 | Charlotte Checkers | ECHL | 22 | 0 | 6 | 6 | 106 | — | — | — | — | — |
| 2008–09 | Hartford Wolf Pack | AHL | 49 | 2 | 5 | 7 | 121 | 4 | 0 | 0 | 0 | 8 |
| 2009–10 | Charlotte Checkers | ECHL | 16 | 1 | 5 | 6 | 52 | 6 | 1 | 1 | 2 | 9 |
| 2009–10 | Hartford Wolf Pack | AHL | 51 | 3 | 6 | 9 | 156 | — | — | — | — | — |
| 2010–11 | Hartford Wolf Pack/CT Whale | AHL | 71 | 2 | 6 | 8 | 204 | 6 | 0 | 0 | 0 | 0 |
| 2011–12 | Connecticut Whale | AHL | 67 | 1 | 9 | 10 | 110 | 9 | 0 | 1 | 1 | 10 |
| 2012–13 | Syracuse Crunch | AHL | 56 | 2 | 5 | 7 | 121 | — | — | — | — | — |
| 2013–14 | Rockford IceHogs | AHL | 67 | 1 | 3 | 4 | 114 | — | — | — | — | — |
| 2014–15 | Toledo Walleye | ECHL | 24 | 2 | 2 | 4 | 24 | 14 | 1 | 1 | 2 | 11 |
| 2014–15 | Hartford Wolf Pack | AHL | 6 | 0 | 1 | 1 | 2 | — | — | — | — | — |
| 2014–15 | Norfolk Admirals | AHL | 20 | 0 | 1 | 1 | 32 | — | — | — | — | — |
| 2014–15 | Grand Rapids Griffins | AHL | 2 | 0 | 0 | 0 | 0 | — | — | — | — | — |
| 2014–15 | Milwaukee Admirals | AHL | 6 | 0 | 0 | 0 | 4 | — | — | — | — | — |
| 2014–15 | Syracuse Crunch | AHL | 8 | 0 | 1 | 1 | 11 | 1 | 0 | 0 | 0 | 0 |
| 2015–16 | Toledo Walleye | ECHL | 37 | 0 | 7 | 7 | 79 | 7 | 0 | 1 | 1 | 4 |
| 2015–16 | Chicago Wolves | AHL | 31 | 2 | 4 | 6 | 68 | — | — | — | — | — |
| 2016–17 | Toledo Walleye | ECHL | 26 | 1 | 3 | 4 | 66 | — | — | — | — | — |
| 2016–17 | Chicago Wolves | AHL | 12 | 0 | 1 | 1 | 18 | — | — | — | — | — |
| 2017–18 | Quad City Mallards | ECHL | 1 | 0 | 1 | 1 | 0 | — | — | — | — | — |
| AHL totals | | | 472 | 16 | 43 | 59 | 989 | 20 | 0 | 1 | 1 | 18 |
