= Carter Bancks =

Canadian ice hockey player (born 1989)

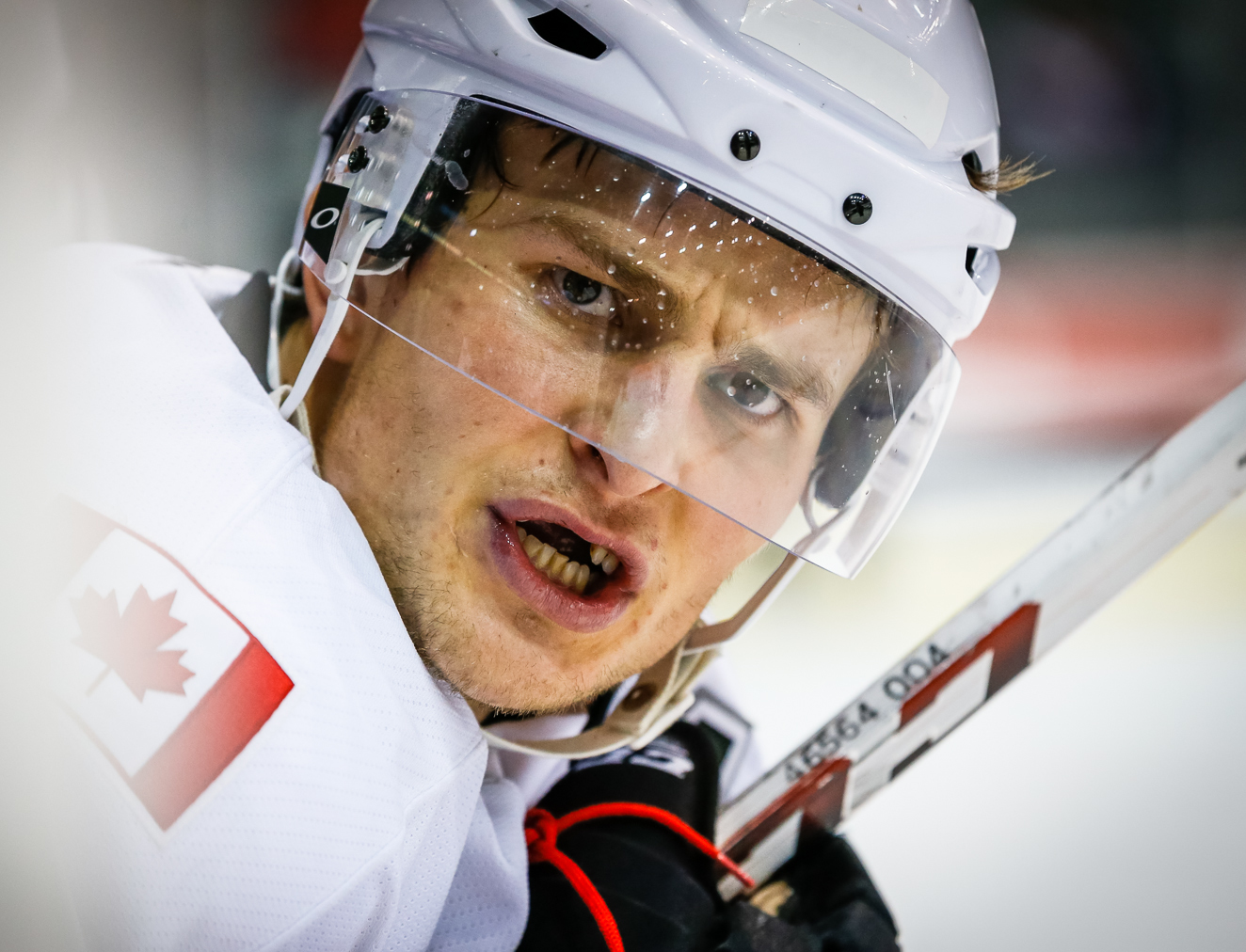
- Bancks in 2013
- Born: August 9, 1989 (age 36) Calgary, Alberta, Canada
- Height: 5 ft 11 in (180 cm)
- Weight: 181 lb (82 kg; 12 st 13 lb)
- Position: Left wing
- Shot: Left
- Played for: Calgary Flames
- NHL draft: Undrafted
- Playing career: 2010–2020

Carter Bancks (born August 9, 1989) is a former Canadian former professional ice hockey player. An undrafted player, Bancks played four seasons of junior in the Western Hockey League (WHL) and four more in the American Hockey League (AHL) before making his NHL debut in 2013 with the Calgary Flames. He later played the majority of his professional career with and served as captain of the Utica Comets of the American Hockey League (AHL). Bancks was born in Calgary, Alberta, but grew up in Kimberley, British Columbia.

== Playing career ==
As a junior, Bancks played with the Junior B Kimberley Dynamiters of the Kootenay International Junior Hockey League in 2005–06 before earning a late-season appearance with the Lethbridge Hurricanes of the Western Hockey League (WHL). He played four full seasons with the Hurricanes between 2006 and 2010, scoring 58 goals and 120 assists in 262 games.

Bancks went unselected at the NHL draft, and upon graduating from junior, was signed to an American Hockey League (AHL) contract with the Abbotsford Heat. He played his first full season of professional hockey in 2010–11 and while a concussion limited him to 29 games, Bancks still scored 19 points. He made a positive impression with his team; head coach Jim Playfair argued that if Bancks had been healthy throughout the season, Abbotsford would not have missed the AHL playoffs. His performance was enough for the Calgary Flames, the parent club of the Heat, to sign him to an NHL contract. He remained with the Heat for the following two seasons, scoring 10 points in 55 games in 2011–12, and 12 in 59 games the following year.

Upon the conclusion of the 2012–13 AHL season, Bancks was one of several players recalled by Calgary. He made his NHL debut on April 23, 2013, against the Nashville Predators.

As an unsigned free agent from the Flames heading into the 2014–15 season, Bancks accepted an invite to the Vancouver Canucks training camp. He was later reassigned to AHL affiliate, the Utica Comets, on September 27, 2014.

On October 14, 2016, the day before the start of this third full season with the team, Bancks was named captain of the Utica Comets.

After six seasons with the Utica Comets, before the 2020–21 season, Bancks announced his retirement from a 10-year professional hockey career on January 11, 2020, at the age of 31.

== Personal life ==
Bancks' father, Jerry, was the head coach of the Kimberley Dynamiters of the KIJHL.

== Career statistics ==
			Regular season					Playoffs
Season	Team	League	GP	G	A	Pts	PIM	GP	G	A	Pts	PIM
2004–05	Kimberley Dynamiters	KIJHL	11	1	5	6	10	—	—	—	—	—
2005–06	Kimberley Dynamiters	KIJHL	50	24	49	73	57	13	5	7	12	6
2005–06	Lethbridge Hurricanes	WHL	2	0	0	0	0	6	0	0	0	4
2006–07	Lethbridge Hurricanes	WHL	67	11	20	31	64	—	—	—	—	—
2007–08	Lethbridge Hurricanes	WHL	70	15	30	45	56	19	6	4	10	19
2008–09	Lethbridge Hurricanes	WHL	53	13	34	47	68	3	0	0	0	4
2009–10	Lethbridge Hurricanes	WHL	70	19	36	55	96	—	—	—	—	—
2009–10	Abbotsford Heat	AHL	9	0	0	0	0	13	0	1	1	7
2010–11	Abbotsford Heat	AHL	29	5	14	19	16	—	—	—	—	—
2011–12	Abbotsford Heat	AHL	55	2	8	10	57	8	0	0	0	14
2012–13	Abbotsford Heat	AHL	59	5	7	12	53	—	—	—	—	—
2012–13	Calgary Flames	NHL	2	0	0	0	0	—	—	—	—	—
2013–14	Abbotsford Heat	AHL	72	3	8	11	53	4	0	0	0	0
2014–15	Utica Comets	AHL	57	6	8	14	44	10	0	0	0	4
2015–16	Utica Comets	AHL	76	14	25	39	46	4	0	0	0	0
2016–17	Utica Comets	AHL	69	10	12	22	27	—	—	—	—	—
2017–18	Utica Comets	AHL	45	4	13	17	58	5	0	1	1	2
2018–19	Utica Comets	AHL	69	4	11	15	47	—	—	—	—	—
2019–20	Utica Comets	AHL	51	6	7	13	31	—	—	—	—	—
AHL totals			591	59	103	162	432	44	0	2	2	27
NHL totals			2	0	0	0	0	—	—	—	—	—
