= Adirondack Flames =

Ice hockey team in Glens Falls, New York, US

- City: Glens Falls, New York
- League: American Hockey League
- Conference: Western Conference
- Division: North Division
- Founded: 1977
- Operated: 2014–2015
- Home arena: Glens Falls Civic Center
- Colors: Red, black, gold, white
- Owners: Calgary Sports and Entertainment (N. Murray Edwards, chairman)
- Affiliates: Calgary Flames (NHL)

Franchise history
- 1977–1987: Maine Mariners
- 1987–1993: Utica Devils
- 1993–2003: Saint John Flames
- 2005–2007: Omaha Ak-Sar-Ben Knights
- 2007–2009: Quad City Flames
- 2009–2014: Abbotsford Heat
- 2014–2015: Adirondack Flames
- 2015–2022: Stockton Heat
- 2022–Present: Calgary Wranglers

The Adirondack Flames were a professional ice hockey team in the American Hockey League (AHL). The team was based in Glens Falls, New York, and played at the 4,794 seat Glens Falls Civic Center. They were the top affiliate of the Calgary Flames of the National Hockey League (NHL), and made their debut in the 2014–15 AHL season after relocating from Abbotsford, British Columbia, where the team was known as the Heat. Former Portland Pirates managing owner and CEO Brian Petrovek served as the team's president. For the 2015–16 season, the Adirondack Flames moved to Stockton, California, and became the Stockton Heat.

== History ==
After playing five seasons in Abbotsford, British Columbia, as the Abbotsford Heat, the city of Abbotsford terminated its contract with the Heat on April 15, 2014, and on May 5, 2014, the American Hockey League (AHL)'s board of governors announced its approval to relocate the team to Glens Falls for the 2014–15 season. The contract between the city of Glens Falls and the Calgary Flames ran for three seasons with an option to renew for two more seasons.

The relocation of Calgary's AHL team ensured that AHL hockey continued uninterrupted in Glens Falls for the 2014–15 season, despite the departure of Glens Falls' previous AHL team, the Adirondack Phantoms, who relocated to Allentown, Pennsylvania, following 2013–14 AHL season to become the Lehigh Valley Phantoms.

The team's logo pays homage to the former NHL team the Atlanta Flames, which relocated to Calgary, Alberta, in 1980 to become the current Calgary Flames.

The team earned a certain degree of notoriety when its mascot, "Scorch", was introduced. In what a number of Flames fans saw as poor taste, an introductory video showed Scorch, supposedly the last unextinguished flame from a fire that devastated Glens Falls in 1846, overpowering a firefighter and knocking him to the ground. The ensuing controversy prompted the Flames to discontinue Scorch shortly after he was introduced. On June 24, 2014, it was announced Ryan Huska, former head coach of the Kelowna Rockets of the Western Hockey League (WHL), would be the team's first head coach.

On February 10, 2015, the Adirondack Flames routed the Syracuse Crunch by a franchise-high score of 10–0. Sven Baertschi recorded his first professional hat-trick. Turner Elson added two goals, and Kenny Agostino (1G-2A), Mark Cundari (1G-2A), Markus Granlund (1G-1A), Ben Hanowski (2A), Garnet Hathaway (3A), Brian McGrattan (2A) and Tyler Wotherspoon (2A) all posted multi-point efforts. In total, 13 Flames skaters posted at least one point. It was the first time since 2002 a score has reached double-digits in the AHL.

== Relocation and replacement ==
On January 29, 2015, it was confirmed by the AHL via press conference that the Adirondack Flames would relocate from Glens Falls to Stockton, California, and become the Stockton Heat. In turn, the Calgary Flames acquired the Stockton Thunder of the ECHL and relocated that team to Glens Falls as the Adirondack Thunder for the 2015–16 season.

== Season result ==
Regular season											Playoffs				
Season	GP	W	L	OTL	SOL	Pts	PCT	GF	GA	Standing	Year	1st round	2nd round	3rd round	Finals
2014–15	76	35	33	6	2	78	.513	233	240	4th, North	2015	Did not qualify			

== Players ==
=== Head coach ===
- Ryan Huska (2014–15)
