= Abbotsford Heat =

- City: Abbotsford, British Columbia
- League: American Hockey League
- Conference: Western Conference
- Division: West Division
- Founded: 1977
- Operated: 2009–2014
- Home arena: Abbotsford Entertainment & Sports Centre
- Colours: White, red, black, silver
- Affiliates: Calgary Flames (NHL); Alaska Aces (ECHL)

Franchise history
- 1977–1987: Maine Mariners
- 1987–1993: Utica Devils
- 1993–2003: Saint John Flames
- 2005–2007: Omaha Ak-Sar-Ben Knights
- 2007–2009: Quad City Flames
- 2009–2014: Abbotsford Heat
- 2014–2015: Adirondack Flames
- 2015–2022: Stockton Heat
- 2022–Present: Calgary Wranglers

The Abbotsford Heat were a professional ice hockey team that played five seasons in the American Hockey League (AHL) between 2009 and 2014. The team was based in Abbotsford, British Columbia, Canada, and played its home games at the 7,046-seat Abbotsford Entertainment & Sports Centre. The franchise was the American Hockey League (AHL) affiliate of the Calgary Flames and arrived in Abbotsford in 2009 as a relocated franchise formerly known as the Quad City Flames. The team played five seasons in British Columbia before the Flames' lease agreement with the City of Abbotsford was terminated following the 2013–14 season.

On May 5, 2014, the AHL's Board of Governors approved the relocation of the franchise to Glens Falls, New York where the Adirondack Flames replaced the Adirondack Phantoms who had moved to Allentown, Pennsylvania.

== History ==
The Flames moved their affiliate to the Fraser Valley after playing two seasons in Moline, Illinois as the Quad City Flames. The team's transfer was approved on April 28, 2009, and as a result, Abbotsford became the westernmost city in the AHL. The team closest to the Heat in distance, the Oklahoma City Barons, was 1,583 mi (2,548 km) away, and the Heat was the only AHL team west of the Central Time Zone. To reduce travel costs, road teams sometimes played two consecutive games in Abbotsford, and in some cases, the Heat played consecutive road games at the same arena. The same scheduling was used for the St. John's IceCaps.

The organization held a "name the team" contest, and on May 14, 2009, Heat was announced as the team's new name.

On June 5, 2009, it was reported that Jim Playfair would debut as head coach of the Abbotsford Heat after spending two seasons with the Calgary Flames.

=== Relocation to Glens Falls ===
The team struggled financially and saw low attendance; talks eventually broke down between the city of Abbotsford, the Vancouver Canucks, and the Calgary Flames on a possible affiliation swap.

Upon the Vancouver Canucks' purchase of the Peoria Rivermen, the Heat's owners were petitioned from interested groups in Utica, New York. On June 14, 2013, the Vancouver Canucks and Mohawk Valley Garden, the managing partner based in Utica, signed a six-year affiliation agreement, and the Utica Comets became the new AHL affiliate of the Vancouver Canucks. The Canucks moved the team to Abbotsford in 2021, becoming the Abbotsford Canucks.

The city of Abbotsford terminated the contract with the Heat on April 15, 2014. The Heat finished the season and Calder Cup playoffs in Abbotsford, and on May 5, 2014, the AHL's Board of Governors announced at its spring meeting in Chicago that it approved the relocation of the team to Glens Falls for the 2014–15 season, with games to be played at the Glens Falls Civic Center as the Adirondack Flames.

== Team information ==
=== Mascot ===
The Heat's mascot was Hawkey, an anthropomorphic red-tailed hawk, a species native to the Fraser Valley. Hawkey could be seen at home games wearing jersey No. 00.

== Season-by-season results ==
Regular season											Playoffs				
Season	Games	Won	Lost	OTL	SOL	Points	PCT	Goals for	Goals against	Standing	Year	1st round	2nd round	3rd round	Finals
2009–10	80	39	29	5	7	90	.563	217	231	3rd, North	2010	W, 4–3, RCH	L, 2–4, HAM	—	—
2010–11	80	38	32	4	6	86	.538	186	212	4th, North	2011	Out of playoffs			
2011–12	76	42	26	3	5	92	.605	200	201	2nd, West	2012	W, 3–0, MIL	L, 1–4, TOR	—	—
2012–13	76	34	32	4	6	78	.513	171	198	4th, North	2013	Out of playoffs			
2013–14	76	43	25	5	3	94	.618	237	215	2nd, West	2014	L, 1–3, GR	—	—	—
Totals	388	196	144	21	27	440	.567	1011	1057			3 playoff appearances			

=== Team captains ===
- Garth Murray, 2009–10
- Carter Bancks and Ben Walter 2009-10
- Quintin Laing, 2010–13
- Dean Arsene, 2013–14

=== American Hockey League Hall of Famers ===
AHL Hall of Fame Honored Members
Name	Seasons	Induction Year
Robbie Ftorek	2013-14 (asst. coach)	2020
