= 2015 Kelly Cup playoffs =

Tournament details
- Dates: April 14–June 14, 2015
- Teams: 16

Final positions
- Champions: Allen Americans
- Runners-up: South Carolina Stingrays

Tournament statistics
- Scoring leader(s): Wayne Simpson (South Carolina) (38 points)

The 2015 Kelly Cup Playoffs of the ECHL started April 14, 2015 following the conclusion of the 2014–15 ECHL regular season.

== Playoff format ==
At the end of the regular season the top four teams in each division qualified for the 2015 Kelly Cup Playoffs. The first two playoff rounds are played entirely within the divisions, with the divisional playoff champions facing each other in the conference championships. The Kelly Cup final pits the Eastern Conference champion against the Western Conference champion. All four rounds are a best-of-seven format.

== Playoff seeds ==
After the regular season, 16 teams qualified for the playoffs. The Toledo Walleye were the Brabham Cup winners with the best record, winning their first regular season title since the 2002-03 season, when they were known as the Storm.

=== Eastern Conference ===
==== North Division ====
1. Toledo Walleye
2. Fort Wayne Komets
3. Kalamazoo Wings
4. Wheeling Nailers

==== East Division ====
1. Florida Everblades
2. South Carolina Stingrays
3. Reading Royals
4. Orlando Solar Bears

=== Western Conference ===
==== Central Division ====
1. Allen Americans
2. Rapid City Rush
3. Quad City Mallards
4. Tulsa Oilers

==== Pacific Division ====
1. Idaho Steelheads
2. Ontario Reign
3. Colorado Eagles
4. Utah Grizzlies

== Playoff Brackets ==
Division semifinals	Division finals
N1	Toledo Walleye	4
N4	Wheeling Nailers	3
N1	Toledo	4
North Division
N2	Fort Wayne	3
N2	Fort Wayne Komets	4
N3	Kalamazoo Wings	1
Eastern Conference
E1	Florida Everblades	4
E4	Orlando Solar Bears	2
E1	Florida	2
East Division
E2	South Carolina	4
E2	South Carolina Stingrays	4
E3	Reading Royals	3
C1	Allen Americans	4
C4	Tulsa Oilers	1
C1	Allen	4
Central Division
C2	Rapid City	2
C2	Rapid City Rush	4
C3	Quad City Mallards	3
Western Conference
P1	Idaho Steelheads	2
P4	Utah Grizzlies	4
P4	Utah	1
Pacific Division
P2	Ontario	4
P2	Ontario Reign	4
P3	Colorado Eagles	3

Conference finals
N1	Toledo	3
E2	South Carolina	4
C1	Allen	4
P2	Ontario	3

Kelly Cup finals
E2	South Carolina	3
C1	Allen	4

== Division Semifinals ==
Home team is listed first.

=== North Division ===
==== (1) Toledo Walleye vs. (4) Wheeling Nailers ====
April 16	Toledo Walleye	2–3	Wheeling Nailers	Huntington Center	Recap
Cody Lampl (1) 15:37 PP		First period	David Gilbert (1) 15:58
Shane Berschbach (1) 13:35 PP		Second period	Sahir Gill (1) 19:17
No scoring		Third period	David Gilbert (2) 11:10
Jeff Lerg 33 shots / 30 saves		Goalie stats	Franky Palazzese 28 shots / 26 saves

April 18	Toledo Walleye	2–1	OT	Wheeling Nailers	Huntington Center	Recap
No scoring		First period		Adam Krause (1) 6:02 PP
No scoring		Second period		No scoring
Troy Schwab (1) 7:26		Third period		No scoring
Troy Schwab (2) 1:35		First overtime period		No scoring
Jeff Lerg 29 shots / 28 saves		Goalie stats		Franky Palazzese 28 shots / 26 saves

April 22	Wheeling Nailers	5–4	Toledo Walleye	WesBanco Arena	Recap
Riley Brace (1) 3:00 SH; Riley Brace (2) 5:23		First period	No scoring
David Makowski (1) 19:41		Second period	Shane Berschbach (2) 1:56; Cody Lampl (2) 9:13; A.J. Jenks (1) 12:10 PP; Justin Mercier (1) 16:02
Sahir Gill (2) 6:30; David Gilbert (3) 9:23		Third period	No scoring
Franky Palazzese 39 shots / 35 saves Eric Hartzell 13 shots / 13 saves		Goalie stats	Jeff Lerg 24 shots / 19 saves

April 24	Wheeling Nailers	1–4	Toledo Walleye	WesBanco Arena	Recap
No scoring		First period	Troy Schwab (3) 2:08 PP
No scoring		Second period	Shane Berschbach (3) 4:19; Justin Mercier (2) 5:35; Kyle Bonis (1) 16:38
Sahir Gill (3) 12:03 PP		Third period	No scoring
Eric Hartzell 29 shots / 25 saves		Goalie stats	Jeff Lerg 20 shots / 19 saves

April 25	Wheeling Nailers	1–2	Toledo Walleye	WesBanco Arena	Recap
Chaz Johnson (1) 4:52 PP		First period	No scoring
No scoring		Second period	Justin Mercier (3) 12:25 PP
No scoring		Third period	A.J. Jenks (2) 14:32
Eric Hartzell 21 shots / 19 saves		Goalie stats	Jeff Lerg 32 shots / 31 saves

April 28	Toledo Walleye	2–5	Wheeling Nailers	Huntington Center	Recap
No scoring		First period	Zack Torquato (1) 3:42
No scoring		Second period	Riley Brace (3) 7:39 SH; Sahir Gill (4) 16:58 PP
Joe Stejskal (1) 7:02; Tyler Barnes (1) 16:19		Third period	Zack Torquato (2) 15:22; Zack Torquato (3) 19:33 EN
Jeff Lerg 37 shots / 33 saves		Goalie stats	Eric Hartzell 30 shots / 28 saves

April 29	Toledo Walleye	2–1	OT	Wheeling Nailers	Huntington Center	Recap
Kyle Bonis (2) 3:40		First period		No scoring
No scoring		Second period		No scoring
No scoring		Third period		Zack Torquato (4) 12:37
Kyle Bonis (3) 2:54 SH		First overtime period		No scoring
Jeff Lerg 32 shots / 31 saves		Goalie stats		Eric Hartzell 39 shots / 37 saves

Toledo wins series 4–3

==== (2) Fort Wayne Komets vs. (3) Kalamazoo Wings ====
April 17	Fort Wayne Komets	4–2	Kalamazoo Wings	Allen County War Memorial Coliseum	Recap
Drew Daniels (1) 13:50		First period	No scoring
Shawn Szydlowski (1) 9:58; Cody Sol (1) 19:54		Second period	Gergo Nagy (1) 1:59
Paul Crowder (1) 7:55		Third period	Patrick Kennedy (1) 18:55 PP
Roman Will 30 shots / 28 saves		Goalie stats	Joel Martin 37 shots / 33 saves

April 18	Fort Wayne Komets	3–0	Kalamazoo Wings	Allen County War Memorial Coliseum	Recap
Garrett Meurs (1) 15:24 PP		First period	No scoring
No scoring		Second period	No scoring
Mike Embach (1) 19:31 EN; C.J. Severyn (1) 19:51 EN		Third period	No scoring
Roman Will 35 shots / 35 saves		Goalie stats	Joel Martin 26 shots / 25 saves

April 22	Kalamazoo Wings	1–3	Fort Wayne Komets	Wings Stadium	Recap
No scoring		First period	Matthew Pistilli (1) 4:36; Garrett Meurs (2) 10:15
Lane Scheidl (1) 7:13		Second period	No scoring
No scoring		Third period	Matthew Pistilli (2) 18:42 EN
Roman Will 32 shots / 31 saves		Goalie stats	Joel Martin 41 shots / 39 saves

April 24	Kalamazoo Wings	4–3	Fort Wayne Komets	Wings Stadium	Recap
Ludwig Blomstrand (1) 11:53 PP		First period	Shawn Szydlowski (2) 14:16; Mitchell Heard (1) 19:58 PP
Sam Ftorek (1) 4:56; Justin Taylor (1) 12:23		Second period	No scoring
Ludwig Blomstrand (2) 15:07 PP		Third period	Matthew Pistilli (3) 5:02
Joel Martin 34 shots / 31 saves		Goalie stats	Roman Will 40 shots / 36 saves

April 25	Kalamazoo Wings	4–6	Fort Wayne Komets	Wings Stadium	Recap
Gergo Nagy (2) 3:50; Jake Chelios (1) 12:54 PP		First period	Matt Lowry (1) 0:15; C.J. Severyn (2) 10:38 PP; Matthew Pistilli (4) 17:20
Jean Bourbeau (1) 14:33 SH		Second period	Drew Daniels (2) 10:26; Mitchell Heard (2) 19:25
Michael Neal (1) 12:36 PP		Third period	Eric Faille (1) 19:46 EN
Joel Martin 26 shots / 21 saves		Goalie stats	Roman Will 30 shots / 26 saves

Fort Wayne wins series 4–1

=== East Division ===
==== (1) Florida Everblades vs. (4) Orlando Solar Bears ====
April 17	Florida Everblades	3–2	Orlando Solar Bears	Germain Arena	Recap
Nicolas Deschamps (1) 3:11		First period	Jacob Cepis (1) 3:28; Jacob Cepis (2) 5:30
Steven Whitney (1) 13:27; Nicolas Deschamps (2) 15:57 PP		Second period	No scoring
No scoring		Third period	No scoring
Allen York 27 shots / 25 saves		Goalie stats	Garret Sparks 33 shots / 30 saves

April 18	Florida Everblades	5–1	Orlando Solar Bears	Germain Arena	Recap
Corey Trivino (1) 18:23; Mitch Wahl (1) 19:23		First period	Brett Findlay (1) 11:06
Steven Whitney (2) 11:36; Mitch Wahl (2) 12:50		Second period	No scoring
Adam Brace (1) 17:22 EN		Third period	No scoring
Allen York 19 shots / 18 saves		Goalie stats	Garret Sparks 15 shots / 11 saves Maxime Clermont 10 shots / 10 saves

April 21	Orlando Solar Bears	5–2	Florida Everblades	Amway Center	Recap
Johnny McInnis (1) 14:27		First period	No scoring
Johnny McInnis (2) 3:38; Ben Johnson (1) 4:27		Second period	Casey Pierro-Zabotel (1) 7:34; Mike Cornell (1) 10:55
Eric Baier (1) 0:51; Brady Vail (1) 17:45 EN/SH		Third period	No scoring
Garret Sparks 50 shots / 48 saves		Goalie stats	Allen York 18 shots / 14 saves

April 23	Orlando Solar Bears	4–3	Florida Everblades	Amway Center	Recap
Marshall Everson (1) 4:03 PP		First period	Mike Little (1) 16:17
Brett Findlay (2) 19:14		Second period	Nicolas Deschamps (3) 8:07
Brady Vail (2) 1:40 SH; Brady Vail (3) 8:50		Third period	Casey Pierro-Zabotel (2) 10:17
Garret Sparks 40 shots / 37 saves		Goalie stats	Allen York 33 shots / 29 saves

April 25	Orlando Solar Bears	4–5	Florida Everblades	Amway Center	Recap
Brett Findlay (3) 2:29		First period	Jesse Graham (1) 7:25 PP
Ben Johnson (2) 13:55; Brady Vail (4) 14:57		Second period	Casey Pierro-Zabotel (3) 11:54
Johnny McInnis (3) 19:52		Third period	Corey Trivino (2) 9:53; Casey Pierro-Zabotel (4) 13:14; Mike Little (2) 19:12 EN
Garret Sparks 44 shots / 40 saves		Goalie stats	Allen York 22 shots / 19 saves Daniel Altshuller 1 shots / 0 saves

April 27	Florida Everblades	1–0	OT	Orlando Solar Bears	Germain Arena	Recap
No scoring		First period		No scoring
No scoring		Second period		No scoring
No scoring		Third period		No scoring
Alex Aleardi (1) 12:39		First overtime period		No scoring
Daniel Altshuller 30 shots / 30 saves		Goalie stats		Garret Sparks 34 shots / 33 saves

Florida wins series 4–2

==== (2) South Carolina Stingrays vs. (3) Reading Royals ====
April 17	South Carolina Stingrays	2–1	2OT	Reading Royals	North Charleston Coliseum	Recap
No scoring		First period		No scoring
Joe Devin (1) 1:47 PP		Second period		Maxim Lamarche (1) 17:34
No scoring		Third period		No scoring
Frankie Simonelli (1) 7:21 PP		Second overtime period		No scoring
Jeff Jakaitis 35 shots / 34 saves		Goalie stats		Connor Knapp 39 shots / 37 saves

April 18	South Carolina Stingrays	2–4	Reading Royals	North Charleston Coliseum	Recap
No scoring		First period	Jordan Heywood (1) 8:14; Brandon Alderson (1) 11:22; Jordan Heywood (2) 17:39
Sean Dolan (1) 6:38; Joe Devin (2) 15:33		Second period	No scoring
No scoring		Third period	Ryan Cruthers (1) 1:38
Jeff Jakaitis 20 shots / 16 saves		Goalie stats	Connor Knapp 35 shots / 33 saves

April 23	Reading Royals	2–5	South Carolina Stingrays	Santander Arena	Recap
David Marshall (1) 2:40		First period	No scoring
David Marshall (2) 15:29 SH		Second period	Andrew Rowe (1) 4:20; Michal Cajkovsky (1) 11:53; Sean Dolan (2) 13:20 PP
No scoring		Third period	Wayne Simpson (1) 11:47; Patrick Gaul (1) 18:53 EN
Connor Knapp 26 shots / 22 saves		Goalie stats	Jeff Jakaitis 27 shots / 25 saves

April 25	Reading Royals	4–2	South Carolina Stingrays	Santander Arena	Recap
No scoring		First period	Marcus Perrier (1) 1:29 PP
David Marshall (3) 14:11		Second period	No scoring
Mike Marcou (1) 3:00; Jordan Heywood (3) 6:44; Pat Mullane (1) 17:35 PP		Third period	Andrew Rowe (2) 17:53
Connor Knapp 29 shots / 27 saves		Goalie stats	Jeff Jakaitis 27 shots / 23 saves

April 26	Reading Royals	3–4	South Carolina Stingrays	Santander Arena	Recap
Mike Marcou (2) 8:10		First period	Wayne Simpson (2) 15:37
Cam Reid (1) 2:37 PP; Sean Wiles (1) 9:17		Second period	Joe Devin (3) 4:08
No scoring		Third period	Andrew Rowe (3) 7:10; Derek DeBlois (1) 18:39
Connor Knapp 40 shots / 36 saves		Goalie stats	Jeff Jakaitis 27 shots / 24 saves

April 28	South Carolina Stingrays	1–6	Reading Royals	North Charleston Coliseum
No scoring		First period	No scoring
Joe Devin (4) 1:27		Second period	Cam Reid (2) 2:15; Andrew Johnston (1) 2:46; Cam Reid (3) 4:51 PP; Adam Comrie (1) 17:06 PP; Adam Comrie (2) 18:26 PP
No scoring		Third period	David Marshall (4) 15:10 PP
Jeff Jakaitis 22 shots / 18 saves Clay Witt 12 shots / 10 saves		Goalie stats	Connor Knapp 19 shots / 18 saves

April 29	South Carolina Stingrays	3–2	Reading Royals	North Charleston Coliseum	Recap
No scoring		First period	No scoring
No scoring		Second period	Jordan Heywood (4) 3:25; David Marshall (5) 18:53
Derek DeBlois (2) 1:30; Joe Devin (5) 13:32 PP; Joe Devin (6) 16:32		Third period	No scoring
Jeff Jakaitis 23 shots / 21 saves		Goalie stats	Connor Knapp 35 shots / 32 saves

South Carolina wins series 4–3

=== Central Division ===
==== (1) Allen Americans vs. (4) Tulsa Oilers ====
April 14	Allen Americans	6–2	Tulsa Oilers	Allen Event Center	Recap
Vincent Arseneau (1) 6:11		First period	T.J. Caig (1) 13:12
Chris Crane (1) 5:53; Spencer Asuchak (1) 9:23 PP; Chad Costello (1) 14:25; Spencer Asuchak (2) 15:41		Second period	Jon Booras (1) 4:59
Gary Steffes (1) 19:27 PP		Third period	No scoring
Riley Gill 21 shots / 19 saves		Goalie stats	Kevin Carr 41 shots / 35 saves

April 15	Allen Americans	5–4	OT	Tulsa Oilers	Allen Event Center	Recap
No scoring		First period		Drew Fisher (1) 12:01 PP; Drew Fisher (2) 13:44 PP; Drew Fisher (3) 19:47
Spencer Asuchak (3) 15:16; Konrad Abeltshauser (1) 17:15 PP		Second period		Jeff Jubinville (1) 11:30
Gary Steffes (2) 11:27; Konrad Abeltshauser (2) 14:29		Third period		No scoring
Greger Hanson (1) 9:41		First overtime period		No scoring
Joel Rumpel 30 shots / 26 saves		Goalie stats		Kevin Carr 56 shots / 51 saves

April 17	Tulsa Oilers	5–1	Allen Americans	BOK Center	Recap
Jon Booras (2) 5:50		First period	No scoring
Stephen Perfetto (1) 2:54; Adam Pleskach (1) 6:21 PP; Sean Erickson (1) 8:32 SH		Second period	Gary Steffes (3) 6:52
Tommy Mele (1) 5:58		Third period	No scoring
Kevin Carr 29 shots / 28 saves		Goalie stats	Riley Gill 17 shots / 13 saves Joel Rumpel 6 shots / 5 saves

April 18	Tulsa Oilers	1–3	Allen Americans	BOK Center	Recap
No scoring		First period	Gary Steffes (4) 13:26
Tommy Mele (2) 5:53 PP		Second period	Jamie Schaafsma (1) 1:51 SH
No scoring		Third period	Greger Hanson (2) 19:16 EN
Kevin Carr 28 shots / 26 saves		Goalie stats	Joel Rumpel 32 shots / 31 saves

April 21	Allen Americans	3–2	Tulsa Oilers	Allen Event Center	Recap
No scoring		First period	No scoring
Dyson Stevenson (1) 10:14; Ian Schultz (1) 12:23; Chad Costello (2) 13:52 PP		Second period	Drew Fisher (4) 5:02 PP
No scoring		Third period	Drew Fisher (5) 17:42
Joel Rumpel 29 shots / 27 saves		Goalie stats	Kevin Carr 34 shots / 31 saves

Allen wins series 4–1

==== (2) Rapid City Rush vs. (3) Quad City Mallards ====
April 17	Rapid City Rush	2–3	Quad City Mallards	Rushmore Plaza Civic Center	Recap
Michael Young (1) 0:29		First period	No scoring
Cody Ferriero (1) 14:03 PP		Second period	Michael Clarke (1) 4:20; Liam Stewart (1) 8:27
No scoring		Third period	Benjamin Dieude-Fauvel (1) 6:23 PP
Danny Battochio 22 shots / 19 saves		Goalie stats	Evan Mosher 25 shots / 23 saves

April 18	Rapid City Rush	3–2	Quad City Mallards	Rushmore Plaza Civic Center	Recap
Spencer Pommells (1) 1:51		First period	No scoring
Brett Kostolansky (1) 17:03		Second period	Joe Perry (1) 4:18 PP; Joe Perry (2) 18:36 SH
Daniel Barczuk (1) 5:03		Third period	No scoring
Danny Battochio 25 shots / 23 saves		Goalie stats	Parker Milner 31 shots / 28 saves

April 22	Quad City Mallards	1–2	OT	Rapid City Rush	iWireless Center	Recap
Justin Fox (1) 2:59 PP		First period		No scoring
No scoring		Second period		No scoring
No scoring		Third period		Kale Kerbashian (1) 8:31
No scoring		First overtime period		Scott Brannon (1) 5:22
Parker Milner 25 shots / 23 saves		Goalie stats		Danny Battochio 25 shots / 24 saves

April 24	Quad City Mallards	2–1	Rapid City Rush	iWireless Center	Recap
No scoring		First period	Jesse Schultz (1) 1:47 PP
Matt Neal (1) 2:43		Second period	No scoring
Matt Neal (2) 17:50 PP		Third period	No scoring
Evan Mosher 21 shots / 20 saves		Goalie stats	Danny Battochio 32 shots / 30 saves

April 25	Quad City Mallards	4–0	Rapid City Rush	iWireless Center	Recap
Jake Baker (1) 6:09		First period	No scoring
Jake Baker (2) 2:59 PP; Mario Lamoureux (1) 14:22		Second period	No scoring
Michael Clarke (2) 16:08		Third period	No scoring
Evan Mosher 31 shots / 31 saves		Goalie stats	Danny Battochio 35 shots / 31 saves

April 28	Rapid City Rush	3–2	Quad City Mallards	Rushmore Plaza Civic Center	Recap
Riley Weselowski (1) 1:08; Winston Day Chief (1) 9:59; Patrick Cullen (1) 19:57 PP		First period	Jake Baker (3) 19:29 SH
No scoring		Second period	No scoring
No scoring		Third period	Matt Neal (3) 0:59
Danny Battochio 26 shots / 24 saves		Goalie stats	Evan Mosher 16 shots / 13 saves Parker Milner 14 shots / 14 saves

April 29	Rapid City Rush	2–1	Quad City Mallards	Rushmore Plaza Civic Center	Recap
No scoring		First period	No scoring
No scoring		Second period	No scoring
Cody Ferriero (2) 3:26; Cody Ferriero (3) 18:57		Third period	Justin Fox (2) 18:28
Danny Battochio 15 shots / 14 saves		Goalie stats	Parker Milner 24 shots / 22 saves

Rapid City wins series 4–3

=== Pacific Division ===
==== (1) Idaho Steelheads vs. (4) Utah Grizzlies ====
April 15	Idaho Steelheads	3–2	OT	Utah Grizzlies	CenturyLink Arena Boise	Recap
Colton Beck (1) 9:36; Wade MacLeod (1) 12:30		First period		Brenden Walker (1) 16:52 PP
No scoring		Second period		No scoring
No scoring		Third period		Danick Paquette (1) 7:31
Jason Bast (1) 5:49		First overtime period		No scoring
Olivier Roy 25 shots / 23 saves		Goalie stats		Igor Bobkov 41 shots / 38 saves

April 17	Utah Grizzlies	3–2	Idaho Steelheads	Maverik Center	Recap
No scoring		First period	Colton Beck (2) 14:22
Danick Paquette (2) 4:39; Danick Paquette (3) 7:18		Second period	Wade MacLeod (2) 4:14
T.J. Syner (1) 8:16		Third period	No scoring
Igor Bobkov 30 shots / 28 saves		Goalie stats	Olivier Roy 36 shots / 33 saves

April 18	Utah Grizzlies	4–5	OT	Idaho Steelheads	Maverik Center	Recap
Ryan Hayes (1) 13:01; Brenden Walker (2) 19:29		First period		Wade MacLeod (3) 11:31
Danick Paquette (4) 7:21		Second period		James Livingston (1) 11:22; Wade MacLeod (4) 19:39 PP
Ryan Hayes (2) 19:05		Third period		Colton Beck (3) 18:13
No scoring		First overtime period		Patrick Cullity (1) 2:09
Igor Bobkov 40 shots / 35 saves		Goalie stats		Olivier Roy 36 shots / 32 saves

April 24	Idaho Steelheads	1–4	Utah Grizzlies	CenturyLink Arena Boise	Recap
No scoring		First period	Ryan Hayes (3) 1:20
No scoring		Second period	Michael Pelech (1) 9:27; Patrick Wellar (1) 15:16
Alex Belzile (1) 11:46		Third period	Brenden Walker (3) 18:42 EN
Olivier Roy 13 shots / 10 saves Chris Rawlings 6 shots / 6 saves		Goalie stats	Igor Bobkov 43 shots / 42 saves

April 25	Idaho Steelheads	2–5	Utah Grizzlies	CenturyLink Arena Boise	Recap
Colton Beck (4) 10:48		First period	Connor Hardowa (1) 11:05
Wade MacLeod (5) 6:10		Second period	No scoring
No scoring		Third period	Michael Pelech (2) 6:11 PP; Connor Hardowa (2) 12:29; Alex Krushelnyski (1) 18:00; T.J. Syner (2) 18:20 EN
Chris Rawlings 30 shots / 26 saves		Goalie stats	Igor Bobkov 25 shots / 23 saves

April 27	Utah Grizzlies	3–0	Idaho Steelheads	Maverik Center	Recap
Ryan Hayes (4) 5:04 PP		First period	No scoring
Alex Krushelnyski (2) 7:06		Second period	No scoring
Ryan Hayes (5) 17:12		Third period	No scoring
Igor Bobkov 41 shots / 41 saves		Goalie stats	Olivier Roy 27 shots / 24 saves

Utah wins series 4–2

==== (2) Ontario Reign vs. (3) Colorado Eagles ====
April 16	Ontario Reign	2–4	Colorado Eagles	Citizens Business Bank Arena	Recap
No scoring		First period	Nathan Moon (1) 3:19; Darryl Bootland (1) 12:11 PP
Alex Roach (1) 17:41		Second period	Chris Duszynski (1) 4:05; Darryl Bootland (2) 10:51 PP
Matt Register (1) 17:20		Third period	No scoring
Joe Cannata 17 shots / 13 saves		Goalie stats	Clarke Saunders 29 shots /27 saves

April 17	Ontario Reign	4–1	Colorado Eagles	Citizens Business Bank Arena	Recap
Matt White (1) 2:20; Rocco Carzo (1) 16:32 SH		First period	No scoring
No scoring		Second period	Derek Rodwell (1) 16"05SH
Everett Sheen (1) 12:39; Garry Nunn (1) 17:57 EN		Third period	No scoring
Joe Cannata 13 shots / 12 saves Jussi Olkinuora 3 shots / 3 saves		Goalie stats	Clarke Saunders 30 shots / 27 saves

April 19	Colorado Eagles	1–5	Ontario Reign	Budweiser Events Center	Recap
Vitalijs Pavlovs (1) 13:49 PP		First period	Matt White (2) 17:15 PP; Matt White (3) 18:53
No scoring		Second period	David Rutherford (1) 14:47 PP; Tristan King (1) 17:27 PP
No scoring		Third period	Matt Register (2) 13:55 PP
Jacob DeSerres 27 shots / 22 saves		Goalie stats	Jussi Olkinuora 25 shots / 24 saves

April 22	Colorado Eagles	4–3	Ontario Reign	Budweiser Events Center	Recap
Trent Daavettila (1) 2:12; Vitalijs Pavlovs (2) 11:03		First period	Judd Blackwater (1) 19:55
Trent Daavettila (2) 18:14 PP		Second period	Judd Blackwater (2) 10:13 PP; Garry Nunn (2) 13:58
Brock Nixon (1) 14:39 PP		Third period	No scoring
Clarke Saunders 24 shots / 21 saves		Goalie stats	Jussi Olkinuora 28 shots / 24 saves

April 24	Colorado Eagles	4–1	Ontario Reign	Budweiser Events Center	Recap
Kyle Kraemer (1) 8:50		First period	No scoring
Trent Daavettila (3) 8:07 PP		Second period	Judd Blackwater (3) 1:09
Teigan Zahn (1) 5:42; Brock Nixon (2) 11:50		Third period	No scoring
Clarke Saunders 37 shots / 36 saves		Goalie stats	Jussi Olkinuora 30 shots / 26 saves

April 27	Ontario Reign	4–1	Colorado Eagles	Citizens Business Bank Arena	Recap
Judd Blackwater (4) 14:31		First period	Chris Knowlton (1) 7:47 PP
Matt Register (3) 12:34 PP		Second period	No scoring
Judd Blackwater (5) 14:30; Matt Register (4) 16:04 EN/SH		Third period	No scoring
Jussi Olkinuora 22 shots / 21 saves		Goalie stats	Clarke Saunders 26 shots / 23 saves

April 28	Ontario Reign	4–2	Colorado Eagles	Citizens Business Bank Arena	Recap
Matt White (4) 16:49 PP		First period	Kyle Kraemer (2) 14:09
Norm Ezekiel (1) 11:47; Everett Sheen (2) 16:02; Matt White (5) 17:34		Second period	Kyle Kraemer (3) 19:47 PP
No scoring		Third period	No scoring
Jussi Olkinuora 22 shots / 20 saves		Goalie stats	Clarke Saunders 14 shots / 10 saves Jacob DeSerres 6 shots / 6 saves

Ontario wins series 4–3

== Division Finals ==
Home team is listed first.

=== North Division ===
==== (1) Toledo Walleye vs. (2) Fort Wayne Komets ====
May 1	Toledo Walleye	4–1	Fort Wayne Komets	Huntington Center	Recap
No scoring		First period	No scoring
Tyler Barnes (2) 2:48; Justin Daniels (1) 15:23		Second period	Matt Lowry (2) 16:40 SH
Kyle Bonis (4) 9:55; Kyle Bonis (5) 19:48 EN		Third period	No scoring
Jeff Lerg 22 shots / 21 saves		Goalie stats	Roman Will 29 shots / 26 saves

May 2	Toledo Walleye	5–2	Fort Wayne Komets	Huntington Center	Recap
Justin Mercier (4) 6:27; Troy Schwab (4) 9:50		First period	Eric Faille (2) 7:45
Troy Schwab (5) 10:08		Second period	Matthew Pistilli (5) 15:56
Justin Mercier (5) 13:05; Shane Berschbach (4) 16:27		Third period	No scoring
Neil Conway 37 shots / 35 saves		Goalie stats	Roman Will 25 shots / 20 saves

May 5	Fort Wayne Komets	3–2	OT	Toledo Walleye	Allen County War Memorial Coliseum	Recap
No scoring		First period		Martin Frk (1) 4:13
Mitchell Heard (3) 9:35		Second period		No scoring
Paul Crowder (2) 19:33		Third period		Martin Frk (2) 13:23
Mike Embach (2) 6:09		First overtime period		No scoring
Pat Nagle 23 shots / 21 saves		Goalie stats		Jeff Lerg 42 shots / 39 saves

May 7	Fort Wayne Komets	2–1	OT	Toledo Walleye	Allen County War Memorial Coliseum	Recap
No scoring		First period		No scoring
Mike Embach (3) 8:45 PP		Second period		Troy Schwab (6) 4:29
No scoring		Third period		No scoring
James Martin (1) 5:33		First overtime period		No scoring
Pat Nagle 30 shots / 29 saves		Goalie stats		Jeff Lerg 38 shots / 36 saves

May 9	Toledo Walleye	3–2	Fort Wayne Komets	Huntington Center	Recap
Tyler Barnes (3) 1:28 PP		First period	Kaleigh Schrock (1) 19:28
Troy Schwab (7) 3:06 PP; Shane Berschbach (5) 12:40		Second period	No scoring
No scoring		Third period	Mike Embach (4) 11:33
Jeff Lerg 34 shots / 32 saves		Goalie stats	Pat Nagle 32 shots / 29 saves

May 10	Fort Wayne Komets	3–2	2OT	Toledo Walleye	Allen County War Memorial Coliseum	Recap
No scoring		First period		No scoring
Brett Perlini (1) 5:00 PP		Second period		Josh Holmstrom (1) 16:23
Mike Embach (5) 7:50		Third period		Martin Frk (3) 19:41
Brett Perlini (2) 5:26		Second overtime period		No scoring
Pat Nagle 31 shots / 29 saves		Goalie stats		Neil Conway 56 shots / 53 saves

May 13	Toledo Walleye	5–2	Fort Wayne Komets	Huntington Center	Recap
Tyler Barnes (4) 8:44 PP; Kyle Bonnis (6) 10:17; Justin Mercier (6) 17:34		First period	No scoring
Tyler Barnes (5) 0:16		Second period	Garrett Meurs (3) 16:11; Matthew Pistilli (6) 19:50
Shane Berschbach (6) 17:21 EN		Third period	No scoring
Jeff Lerg 29 shots / 27 saves		Goalie stats	Pat Nagle 22 shots / 18 saves

Toledo wins series 4–3

=== East Division ===
==== (1) Florida Everblades vs. (2) South Carolina Stingrays ====
May 1	Florida Everblades	3–6	South Carolina Stingrays	Germain Arena	Recap
No scoring		First period	Drew MacKenzie (1) 9:33
Matt Marquardt (1) 6:35; Mitch Wahl (3) 9:51		Second period	Rob Bellamy (1) 0:45; Marcus Perrier (2) 8:34; Wayne Simpson (3) 9:39 PP; Marcus Perrier (3) 18:45
Brant Harris (1) 11:36 PP		Third period	Joe Devin (7) 19:32 EN
Daniel Altshuller 15 shots / 10 saves		Goalie stats	Jeff Jakaitis 24 shots / 21 saves

May 2	Florida Everblades	2–4	South Carolina Stingrays	Germain Arena	Recap
No scoring		First period	Andrew Rowe (4) 13:34
No scoring		Second period	Patrick Gaul (2) 16:56
Matt Marquardt (2) 7:09; Mike Little (3) 12:58 PP		Third period	Andrew Rowe (5) 6:00; Joe Devin (8) 14:58
Daniel Altshuller 29 shots / 25 saves		Goalie stats	Jeff Jakaitis 40 shots / 38 saves

May 5	South Carolina Stingrays	3–2	Florida Everblades	North Charleston Coliseum	Recap
Sean Dolan (3) 9:08		First period	Nicolas Deschamps (4) 2:23
Michal Cajkovsky (2) 7:05		Second period	No scoring
Rob Bellamy (2) 19:36		Third period	Corey Trivino (3) 6:20
Jeff Jakaitis 23 shots / 21 saves		Goalie stats	Allen York 24 shots / 21 saves

May 6	South Carolina Stingrays	1–2	3OT	Florida Everblades	North Charleston Coliseum	Recap
No scoring		First period		No scoring
No scoring		Second period		Mike Little (4) 17:58
Drew MacKenzie (2) 18:56		Third period		No scoring
No scoring		Third overtime period		Corey Trivino (4) 5:38
Jeff Jakaitis 50 shots / 48 saves		Goalie stats		Allen York 44 shots / 43 saves

May 8	South Carolina Stingrays	4–5	2OT	Florida Everblades	North Charleston Coliseum	Recap
Frankie Simonelli (2) 12:46; Patrick Gaul (3) 18:12		First period		Corey Trivino (6) 17:59
No scoring		Second period		Gleason Fournier (1) 2:43; Brant Harris (2) 6:54; Mike Cornell (2) 12:02
Wayne Simpson (4) 1:29; Michal Cajkovsky (3) 11:03 PP		Third period		No scoring
No scoring		Second overtime period		Brant Harris (3) 1:20
Jeff Jakaitis 46 shots / 41 saves		Goalie stats		Allen York 11 shots / 9 saves Daniel Altshuller 32 shots / 30 saves

May 11	Florida Everblades	2–5	South Carolina Stingrays	Germain Arena	Recap
No scoring		First period	Wayne Simpson (5) 10:32 PP
No scoring		Second period	Andrew Rowe (6) 9:35
Ray Kaunisto (1) 2:13; Mike Aviani (1) 19:33 PP		Third period	Derek DeBlois (3) 2:43; Derek DeBlois (4) 9:40; Wayne Simpson (6) 13:58 EN
Daniel Altshuller 28 shots / 24 saves		Goalie stats	Jeff Jakaitis 32 shots / 30 saves

South Carolina wins series 4–2

=== Central Division ===
==== (1) Allen Americans vs. (2) Rapid City Rush ====
May 1	Allen Americans	2–4	Rapid City Rush	Allen Event Center	Recap
Gary Steffes (5) 17:57		First period	Cody Ferriero (4) 11:53 PP
No scoring		Second period	Daniel Barczuk (2) 18:30
Spencer Asuchak (4) 16:41 PP		Third period	Winston Day Chief (2) 15:08; Dylan Clarke (1) 19:33 EN
Joel Rumpel 21 shots / 18 saves		Goalie stats	Danny Battochio 38 shots / 36 saves

May 2	Allen Americans	8–1	Rapid City Rush	Allen Event Center	Recap
Ian Schultz (2) 8:08; Konrad Abeltshauser (3) 14:45 PP		First period	Mathieu Brisebois (1) 17:41 PP
Chad Costello (3) 2:33 PP; Vincent Arseneau (2) 6:02; Spencer Asuchak (5) 19:58 PP		Second period	No scoring
Greger Hanson (3) 2:23 PP; Ian Schultz (3) 4:40; Greger Hanson (4) 19:10 PP		Third period	No scoring
Riley Gill 23 shots / 22 saves		Goalie stats	Danny Battochio 40 shots / 35 saves John Griggs 14 shots / 11 saves

May 7	Rapid City Rush	1–4	Allen Americans	Rushmore Plaza Civic Center	Recap
No scoring		First period	No scoring
Johan Ryd (1) 1:42		Second period	No scoring
No scoring		Third period	Justin Baker (1) 5:57; Aaron Gens (1) 11:06; Spencer Asuchak (6) 16:15; Ian Schultz (4) 17:31
Danny Battochio 37 shots / 33 saves		Goalie stats	Riley Gill 25 shots / 24 saves

May 9	Rapid City Rush	4–7	Allen Americans	Rushmore Plaza Civic Center	Recap
Winston Day Chief (3) 7:41		First period	No scoring
Winston Day Chief (4) 3:03; Dallas Ehrhardt (1) 14:45		Second period	Chris Crane (2) 2:26; Ian Schultz (5) 4:43; Greger Hanson (5) 13:41
Michael Young (2) 2:55		Third period	Gary Steffes (6) 4:39; Greger Hanson (6) 5:51; Rylan Schwartz (1) 9:05; Spencer Asuchak (7) 12:37 SH
Danny Battochio 33 shots / 26 saves		Goalie stats	Riley Gill 21 shots / 17 saves

May 10	Rapid City Rush	7–4	Allen Americans	Rushmore Plaza Civic Center	Recap
Daniel Barczuk (3) 8:10		First period	No scoring
Jesse Schultz (2) 1:08; Kevin Harvey (1) 8:09 PP; Riley Weselowski (2) 9:08; Jonathan Narbonne (1) 19:01 SH		Second period	Vincent Arseneau (3) 11:04 PP
Scott Brannon (2) 15:15; Jonathan Narbonne (2) 19:02 EN		Third period	Chad Costello (4) 2:53; Jamie Schaafsma (2) 7:48; Chris Crane (3) 8:26
Danny Battochio 31 shots / 27 saves		Goalie stats	Joel Rumpel 19 shots / 13 saves

May 12	Allen Americans	4–2	Rapid City Rush	Allen Event Center	Recap
Jamie Schaafsma (3) 2:43		First period	Cody Ferriero (5) 10:12 PP; Daniel Tetrault (1) 14:21 PP
Greger Hanson (7) 6:29		Second period	No scoring
Chris Crane (4) 9:01; Jamie Schaafsma (3) 15:43		Third period	No scoring
Riley Gill 21 shots / 19 saves		Goalie stats	Danny Battochio 30 shots / 26 saves

Allen wins series 4–2

=== Pacific Division ===
==== (2) Ontario Reign vs. (4) Utah Grizzlies ====
May 3	Ontario Reign	3–2	OT	Utah Grizzlies	Citizens Business Bank Arena	Recap
David Rutherford (2) 2:37		First period		Ryan Hayes (6) 12:44 PP
Matt Register (5) 17:36 PP		Second period		Alex Krushelnyski (3) 12:04
No scoring		Third period		No scoring
Judd Blackwater (5) 8:30		First overtime period		No scoring
Jussi Olkinuora 24 shots / 22 saves		Goalie stats		Igor Bobkov 25 shots / 22 saves

May 4	Ontario Reign	6–2	Utah Grizzlies	Citizens Business Bank Arena	Recap
Matt White (6) 1:39; Garry Nunn (3) 12:32; Rocco Carzo (2) 15:31 PP		First period	No scoring
Tristan King (2) 1:05 PP		Second period	Michael Pelech (3) 11:43
Tristan King (3) 15:30; Matt White (7) 18:18 EN		Third period	Matt Pelech (1) 6:34
Jussi Olkinuora 30 shots / 28 saves		Goalie stats	Igor Bobkov 8 shots / 4 saves Eric Levine 12 shots / 11 saves

May 6	Utah Grizzlies	4–2	Ontario Reign	Maverik Center	Recap
Michael Pelech (4) 9:59		First period	Rocco Carzo (3) 7:42
Michael Pelech (5) 14:18 SH		Second period	Josh Brittain (1) 11:09
Camden Wojtala (1) 9:09; Mathieu Aubin (1) 19:01 EN/SH		Third period	No scoring
Igor Bobkov 12 shots / 10 saves Eric Levine 13 shots / 13 saves		Goalie stats	Jussi Olkinuora 24 shots / 21 saves

May 8	Utah Grizzlies	2–4	Ontario Reign	Maverik Center	Recap
No scoring		First period	Garry Nunn (4) 12:17 PP
Ryan Hayes (7) 2:04 PP; Patrick Weller (2) 8:28		Second period	Maxim Kitsyn (2) 1:05 PP
No scoring		Third period	Garry Nunn (5) 2:08; Tristan King (4) 19:38 EN/PP
Igor Bobkov 27 shots / 24 saves		Goalie stats	Jussi Olkinuora 25 shots / 23 saves

May 9	Utah Grizzlies	0–4	Ontario Reign	Maverik Center	Recap
No scoring		First period	Derek Couture (1) 3:04 PP
No scoring		Second period	Matt Register (6) 16:03 PP
No scoring		Third period	Alex Roach (2) 18:55 EN; Maxim Kitsyn (3) 19:48 PP
Eric Levine 27 shots / 24 saves		Goalie stats	Jussi Olkinuora 22 shots / 22 saves Coleman Vollrath 0 shots / 0 saves

Ontario wins series 4–1

== Conference Finals ==
Home team is listed first.

=== Eastern Conference ===
==== (North #1) Toledo Walleye vs. (East #2) South Carolina Stingrays ====
May 15	Toledo Walleye	1–2	South Carolina Stingrays	Huntington Center	Recap
No scoring		First period	Wayne Simpson (7) 9:09
Joe Stejskal (2) 11:58		Second period	Michal Cajkovsky (4) 19:57 PP
No scoring		Third period	No scoring
Jeff Lerg 24 shots / 22 saves		Goalie stats	Jeff Jakaitis 30 shots / 29 saves

May 16	Toledo Walleye	3–4	South Carolina Stingrays	Huntington Center	Recap
Kyle Bonis (7) 6:55; Justin Mercier (7) 16:20		First period	No scoring
No scoring		Second period	Caleb Herbert (1) 9:52; Caleb Herbert (2) 15:13; Michal Cajkovsky (5) 18:33
A.J. Jenks (3) 17:23		Third period	Derek DeBlois (5) 5:54
Neil Conway 33 shots / 29 saves		Goalie stats	Jeff Jakaitis 25 shots / 22 saves

May 20	South Carolina Stingrays	6–5	OT	Toledo Walleye	North Charleston Coliseum	Recap
Wayne Simpson (8) 5:11; Andrew Rowe (7) 7:08; Patrick Gaul (4) 8:44		First period		A.J. Jenks (4) 8:18
Derek DeBlois (6) 3:35; Derek DeBlois (7) 18:04		Second period		Martin Frk (4) 11:50 PP; Kyle Bonis (8) 19:40
No scoring		Third period		Martin Frk (5) 0:53; Martin Frk (6) 5:41 PP
Rob Ricci (1) 2:05		First overtime period		No scoring
Jeff Jakaitis 23 shots / 18 saves		Goalie stats		Jeff Lerg 28 shots / 22 saves

May 22	South Carolina Stingrays	4–5	Toledo Walleye	North Charleston Coliseum	Recap
Andrew Rowe (8) 5:21 PP		First period	Tyler Barnes (6) 5:49; Justin Mercier (8) 8:17; Troy Schwab (8) 10:48; Kyle Rogers (1) 12:38
Derek DeBlois (8) 7:13; Andrew Rowe (9) 16:04; Michal Cajkovsky (6) 16:32 PP		Second period	Tyler Barnes (7) 9:21
No scoring		Third period	No scoring
Jeff Jakaitis 12 shots / 8 saves Clay Witt 19 shots / 18 saves		Goalie stats	Neil Conway 30 shots / 26 saves

May 23	South Carolina Stingrays	4–5	OT	Toledo Walleye	North Charleston Coliseum	Recap
Drew MacKenzie (3) 12:34; Derek DeBlois (9) 17:05		First period		Martin Frk (7) 3:14
Derek DeBlois (10) 12:29; Andrew Rowe (10) 18:57		Second period		Shane Berschbach (7) 9:46 PP
No scoring		Third period		Martin Frk (8) 9:20 PP; Jared Nightingale (1) 16:10
No scoring		First overtime period		Martin Frk (9) 5:29
Jeff Jakaitis 27 shots / 22 saves		Goalie stats		Neil Conway 34 shots / 30 saves

May 26	Toledo Walleye	5–4	OT	South Carolina Stingrays	Huntington Center	Recap
Shane Berschbach (8) 12:17; A.J. Jenks (5) 18:13 PP		First period		Wayne Simpson (9) 3:24; Andrew Rowe (11) 10:57
Kyle Bonis (9) 3:05; Alden Hirschfeld (1) 7:53		Second period		Joe Devin (9) 6:56
No scoring		Third period		Joe Devin (10) 5:15
Tyler Barnes (8) 4:30		First overtime period		No scoring
Neil Conway 32 shots / 28 saves		Goalie stats		Jeff Jakaitis 34 shots / 29 saves

May 27	Toledo Walleye	0–1	3OT	South Carolina Stingrays	Huntington Center	Recap
No scoring		First period		No scoring
No scoring		Second period		No scoring
No scoring		Third period		No scoring
No scoring		Third overtime period		Joe Devin (11) 5:35
Jeff Lerg 42 shots / 41 saves		Goalie stats		Jeff Jakaitis 44 shots / 44 saves

South Carolina wins series 4–3

=== Western Conference ===
==== (Central #1) Allen Americans vs. (Pacific #2) Ontario Reign ====
May 17	Allen Americans	8–2	Ontario Reign	Allen Event Center	Recap
Gary Steffes (7) 1:28; Chris Crane (5) 3:52; Ian Schultz (6) 8:54; Chad Costello (5) 19:41 PP		First period	Matt White (8) 16:19
Greger Hanson (8) 3:53; Patrik Valcak (1) 7:25		Second period	No scoring
Greger Hanson (9) 7:58 PP; Konrad Abeltshauser (4) 13:08 PP		Third period	Garry Nunn (6) 14:31
Riley Gill 28 shots / 26 saves		Goalie stats	Jussi Olkinuora 4 shots / 1 save Joe Cannata 18 shots / 13 saves

May 18	Allen Americans	0–3	Ontario Reign	Allen Event Center	Recap
No scoring		First period	No scoring
No scoring		Second period	Garry Nunn (7) 1:14; Derek Couture (2) 9:04 PP
No scoring		Third period	Matt Register (7) 19:29 EN/SH
Riley Gill 23 shots / 21 saves		Goalie stats	Joe Cannata 35 shots / 35 saves

May 21	Ontario Reign	4–1	Allen Americans	Citizens Business Bank Arena	Recap
No scoring		First period	No scoring
Judd Blackwater (6) 5:25 PP		Second period	Justin Baker (2) 9:28
Matt White (9) 14:17; Maxim Kitsyn (4) 17:16; Garry Nunn (8) 19:08 EN		Third period	No scoring
Joe Cannata 22 shots / 21 saves		Goalie stats	Riley Gill 16 shots / 13 saves

May 23	Ontario Reign	5–0	Allen Americans	Citizens Business Bank Arena	Recap
David Rutherford (3) 19:30		First period	No scoring
Tristan King (5) 1:08; Matt White (10) 1:29; Garry Nunn (9) 8:46 PP		Second period	No scoring
David Rutherford (4) 7:06 PP		Third period	No scoring
Joe Cannata 31 shots / 31 saves		Goalie stats	Riley Gill 11 shots / 7 saves Joel Rumpel 13 shots / 12 saves

May 24	Ontario Reign	2–6	Allen Americans	Citizens Business Bank Arena	Recap
Judd Blackwater (7) 14:08 PP		First period	No scoring
Rocco Carzo (4) 14:30		Second period	Justin Baker (3) 6:26
No scoring		Third period	Chad Costello (6) 8:27; Gary Steffes (8) 9:15; Spencer Asuchak (8) 15:00; Chris Crane (6) 17:59 EN; Spencer Asuchak (9) 19:04 PP
Joe Cannata 27 shots / 22 saves		Goalie stats	Riley Gill 24 shots / 22 saves

May 26	Allen Americans	2–1	Ontario Reign	Allen Event Center	Recap
No scoring		First period	No scoring
Greger Hanson (10) 7:07		Second period	Tristan King (6) 9:56
Chad Costello (7) 2:01		Third period	No scoring
Riley Gill 30 shots / 29 saves		Goalie stats	Joe Cannata 21 shots / 19 saves

May 27	Allen Americans	3–1	Ontario Reign	Allen Event Center	Recap
Tyler Ludwig (1) 1:18		First period	No scoring
Gary Steffes (9) 19:12		Second period	Tristan King (7) 16:13
Chris Crane (7) 19:25 EN		Third period	No scoring
Riley Gill 30 shots / 29 saves		Goalie stats	Joe Cannata 24 shots / 22 saves

Allen wins series 4–3

== Kelly Cup Finals ==
Home team is listed first.

=== (Central #1) Allen Americans vs. (East #2) South Carolina Stingrays ===
May 31	Allen Americans	3–4	South Carolina Stingrays	Allen Event Center	Recap
Trevor Ludwig (1) 0:58		First period	Andrew Rowe (12) 3:45; Wayne Simpson (10) 6:19; Wayne Simpson (11) 10:50
Gary Steffes (10) 14:23 PP		Second period	No scoring
Spencer Asuchak (10) 1:43		Third period	Sean Dolan (4) 11:30 SH
Riley Gill 23 shots / 19 saves		Goalie stats	Jeff Jakaitis 24 shots / 21 saves

June 2	Allen Americans	5–2	South Carolina Stingrays	Allen Event Center	Recap
Dyson Stevenson (2) 6:05		First period	No scoring
Gary Steffes (11) 11:17; Gary Steffes (12) 19:43 PP		Second period	No scoring
Spencer Asuchak (11) 4:43; Konrad Abeltshauser (5)19:46 PP		Third period	Scott Ford (1) 1:48; Sean Dolan (5) 9:40
Riley Gill 24 shots / 22 saves		Goalie stats	Jeff Jakaitis 13 shots / 10 saves Clay Witt 8 shots / 6 saves

June 3	Allen Americans	1–4	South Carolina Stingrays	Allen Event Center	Recap
No scoring		First period	No scoring
No scoring		Second period	Michal Cajkovsky (7) 9:02
Chris Crane (8) 7:33		Third period	Andrew Rowe (13) 5:16; Andrew Rowe (14) 16:50; Wayne Simpson (12) 18:07 EN
Riley Gill 27 shots / 24 saves		Goalie stats	Jeff Jakaitis 40 shots / 39 saves

June 7	South Carolina Stingrays	2–3	2OT	Allen Americans	North Charleston Coliseum	Recap
Derek DeBlois (11) 9:02		First period		Dyson Stevenson (3) 6:15; Greger Hanson (11) 6:44
Caleb Herbert (3) 11:49		Second period		No scoring
No scoring		Third period		No scoring
No scoring		Second overtime period		Vincent Arseneau (4) 8:49
Jeff Jakaitis 37 shots / 34 saves		Goalie stats		Riley Gill 46 shots / 44 saves

June 9	South Carolina Stingrays	2–3	OT	Allen Americans	North Charleston Coliseum	Recap
Patrick Gaul (5) 8:17		First period		No scoring
No scoring		Second period		Jamie Schaafsma (5) 9:09
Wayne Simpson (13) 16:05		Third period		Chris Crane (9) 3:01
No scoring		First overtime period		Greger Hanson (12) 5:25
Jeff Jakaitis 32 shots / 29 saves		Goalie stats		Riley Gill 25 shots / 23 saves

June 10	South Carolina Stingrays	4–1	Allen Americans	North Charleston Coliseum	Recap
Marcus Perrier (4) 8:59		First period	No scoring
Joe Devin (12) 11:47; Frankie Simonelli (3) 14:12		Second period	No scoring
Joe Devin (13) 18:15 PP		Third period	Vincent Arseneau (5) 4:07
Jeff Jakaitis 31 shots / 30 saves		Goalie stats	Riley Gill 31 shots / 27 saves

June 14	Allen Americans	6–1	South Carolina Stingrays	Allen Event Center	Recap
Chad Costello (8) 10:31; Vincent Aresenau (6) 11:47		First period	No scoring
Chad Costello (9) 3:16; Gary Steffes (13) 6:21; Chris Crane (10) 19:52 PP		Second period	No scoring
Vincent Aresenau (7) 8:51		Third period	Andrew Rowe (15) 11:25 PP
Riley Gill 28 shots / 27 saves		Goalie stats	Jeff Jakaitis 15 shots / 11 saves Clay Witt 13 shots / 11 saves

Allen wins series 4–3

== Statistical leaders ==
=== Skaters ===
These are the top ten skaters based on points.

Player	Team	GP	G	A	Pts	+/–	PIM
Wayne Simpson	South Carolina Stingrays	27	13	25	38	+20	8
Andrew Rowe	South Carolina Stingrays	27	15	19	34	+14	14
Greger Hanson	Allen Americans	25	12	17	29	+10	14
Derek DeBlois	South Carolina Stingrays	27	11	18	29	+18	23
Chad Costello	Allen Americans	25	9	19	28	-1	12
Shane Berschbach	Toledo Walleye	21	8	17	25	+5	2
Troy Schwab	Toledo Walleye	21	8	14	22	+6	21
Spencer Asuchak	Allen Americans	25	11	10	21	+3	53
Garry Nunn	Ontario Reign	19	9	12	21	+12	17
Chris Crane	Allen Americans	25	10	10	20	+17	20

GP = Games played; G = Goals; A = Assists; Pts = Points; +/– = Plus/minus; PIM = Penalty minutes

=== Goaltending ===
This is a combined table of the top five goaltenders based on goals against average and the top five goaltenders based on save percentage, with at least 240 minutes played. The table is sorted by GAA, and the criteria for inclusion are bolded.

Player	Team	GP	W	L	OTL	SA	GA	GAA	SV%	SO	TOI
Pat Nagle	Fort Wayne Komets	5	3	2	0	138	12	**2.15**	0.913	0	334
Jeff Lerg	Toledo Walleye	15	7	4	4	463	35	**2.20**	**0.924**	0	956
Jussi Olkinuora	Ontario Reign	12	7	4	0	259	24	**2.31**	0.907	0	624
Joe Cannata	Ontario Reign	9	4	4	0	208	20	**2.33**	0.904	2	515
Eric Hartzell	Wheeling Nailers	5	2	2	1	132	10	**2.36**	**0.924**	0	255
Connor Knapp	Reading Royals	7	3	3	1	223	18	2.44	**0.919**	0	443
Igor Bobkov	Utah Grizzlies	10	4	2	3	293	25	2.74	**0.915**	1	547
Garret Sparks	Orlando Solar Bears	6	2	3	1	216	17	2.98	**0.921**	0	342

GP = Games played; W = Wins; L = Losses; OTL = Overtime Losses; SA = Shots against; GA = Goals against; GAA = Goals against average; SV% = Save percentage; SO = Shutouts; TOI = Time on ice (in minutes)

== See also ==
- 2014–15 ECHL season
- List of ECHL seasons

Preceded by 2014 Kelly Cup playoffs	Kelly Cup Playoffs; 2015	Succeeded by 2016 Kelly Cup playoffs
