= Wayne Simpson (ice hockey) =

American professional ice hockey winger (born 1989)

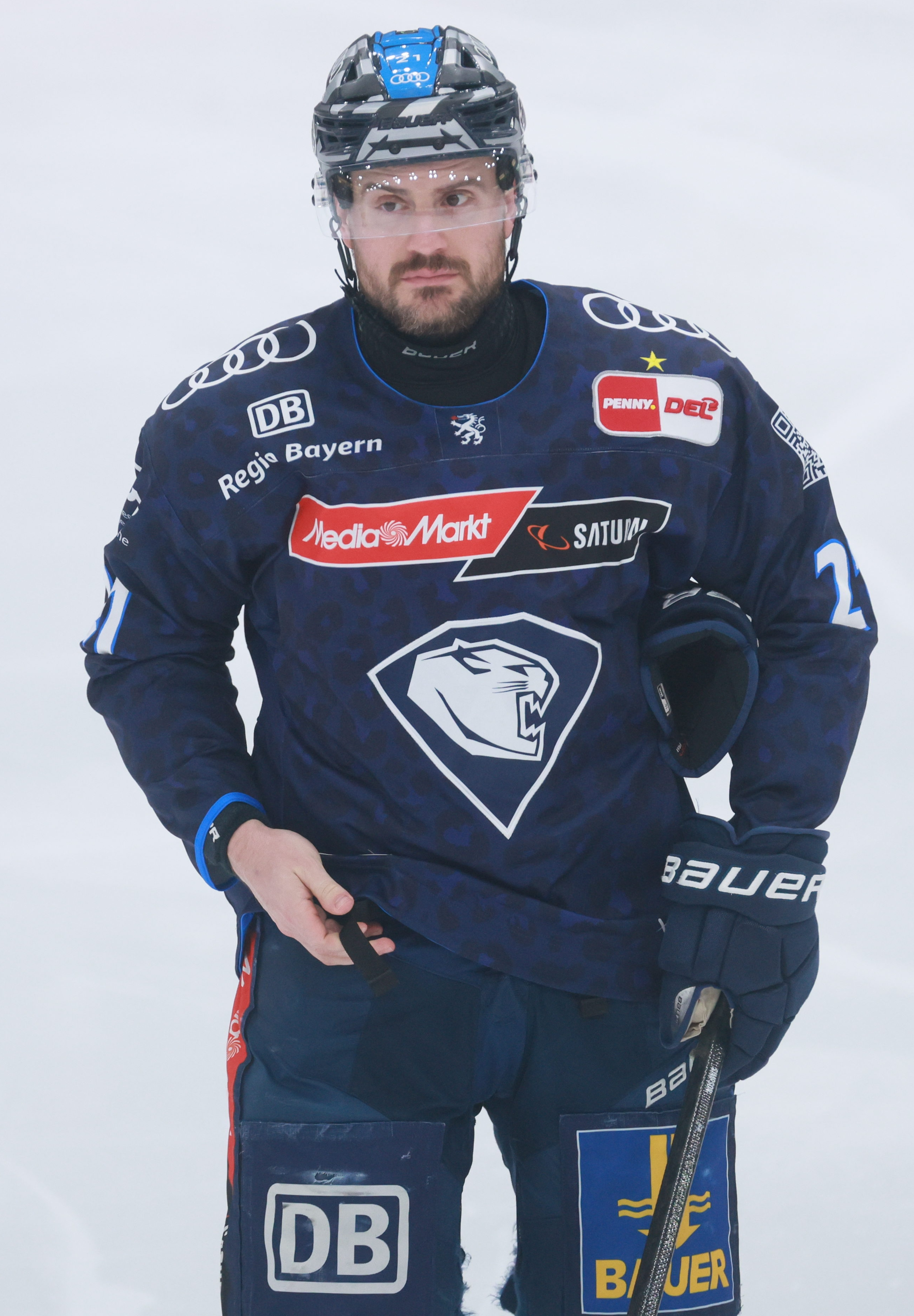
- Simpson in 2025
- Born: November 19, 1989 (age 36) Fort Gordon, Georgia
- Height: 5 ft 11 in (180 cm)
- Weight: 194 lb (88 kg; 13 st 12 lb)
- Position: Right wing
- Shoots: Right
- DEL team Former teams: ERC Ingolstadt; Providence Bruins; Portland Pirates; Hershey Bears; Rochester Americans
- NHL draft: Undrafted
- Playing career: 2013–present

Wayne Simpson (born November 19, 1989) is an American professional ice hockey winger who is currently playing for ERC Ingolstadt of the Deutsche Eishockey Liga (DEL).

== Playing career ==
Undrafted out of college, Simpson joined the South Carolina Stingrays in the ECHL. During his time with the Stingrays, Simpson set a new ECHL record for most points in a playoff year during the 2015 Kelly Cup playoffs. He was loaned to the Providence Bruins during the 2014–15 season before signing a one-year contract with the Portland Pirates the following season. Simpson re-signed with the Bruins before the 2016–17 season.

As a free agent, Simpson secured his first NHL contract, signing a one-year, two-way contract with the Washington Capitals on July 11, 2017. After attending the Capitals training camp, Simpson was reassigned to AHL affiliate the Hershey Bears for the 2017–18 season. Simpson maintained his offensive game with the Bears, playing on a scoring line and finishing third on the team in points with 42, while appearing in every game (76), unable to earn a recall to the Capitals.

Unsigned by the Capitals, Simpson opted to continue in the AHL, joining his fourth club in the Rochester Americans on a one-year contract on August 16, 2018. Simpson continued to be an offensive presence in the AHL during the 2018–19 season, posting 21 goals and 45 points appearing in 72 regular season games.

After five seasons in the AHL, Simpson left as a free agent and opted to sign abroad, agreeing to a one-year contract with German club ERC Ingolstadt of the DEL on July 9, 2019.

== Personal life ==
Simpson comes from a hockey-playing family; his father and both his siblings played collegiate hockey and his grandfather was the athletic director at Boston University.

== Career statistics ==
			Regular season					Playoffs
Season	Team	League	GP	G	A	Pts	PIM	GP	G	A	Pts	PIM
2006–07	Lawrence Academy	USHS	29	9	17	26	—	—	—	—	—	—
2007–08	Lawrence Academy	USHS	30	18	30	48	—	—	—	—	—	—
2008–09	Lawrence Academy	USHS	30	31	29	60	—	—	—	—	—	—
2009–10	Union College	ECAC	39	6	12	18	8	—	—	—	—	—
2010–11	Union College	ECAC	40	16	14	30	18	—	—	—	—	—
2011–12	Union College	ECAC	41	18	13	31	12	—	—	—	—	—
2012–13	Union College	ECAC	39	16	20	36	10	—	—	—	—	—
2013–14	South Carolina Stingrays	ECHL	66	22	19	41	6	4	0	1	1	2
2014–15	South Carolina Stingrays	ECHL	65	16	39	55	23	27	13	25	38	8
2014–15	Providence Bruins	AHL	4	1	0	1	0	—	—	—	—	—
2015–16	Portland Pirates	AHL	68	8	28	36	6	3	1	0	1	0
2016–17	Providence Bruins	AHL	76	16	33	49	10	17	4	10	14	4
2017–18	Hershey Bears	AHL	76	14	28	42	17	—	—	—	—	—
2018–19	Rochester Americans	AHL	72	21	24	45	16	3	0	2	2	0
2019–20	ERC Ingolstadt	DEL	52	20	36	56	20	—	—	—	—	—
2020–21	ERC Ingolstadt	DEL	33	16	19	35	16	5	2	5	7	6
2021–22	ERC Ingolstadt	DEL	50	21	23	44	24	2	0	0	0	0
2022–23	ERC Ingolstadt	DEL	39	8	30	38	10	16	3	7	10	6
2023–24	ERC Ingolstadt	DEL	51	8	19	27	15	5	1	5	6	2
2024–25	ERC Ingolstadt	DEL	51	14	25	39	16	12	6	4	10	4
AHL totals			296	60	113	173	49	23	5	12	17	4
DEL totals			276	87	152	239	101	40	12	21	33	18
