= Andrew Rowe (ice hockey) =

American ice hockey player

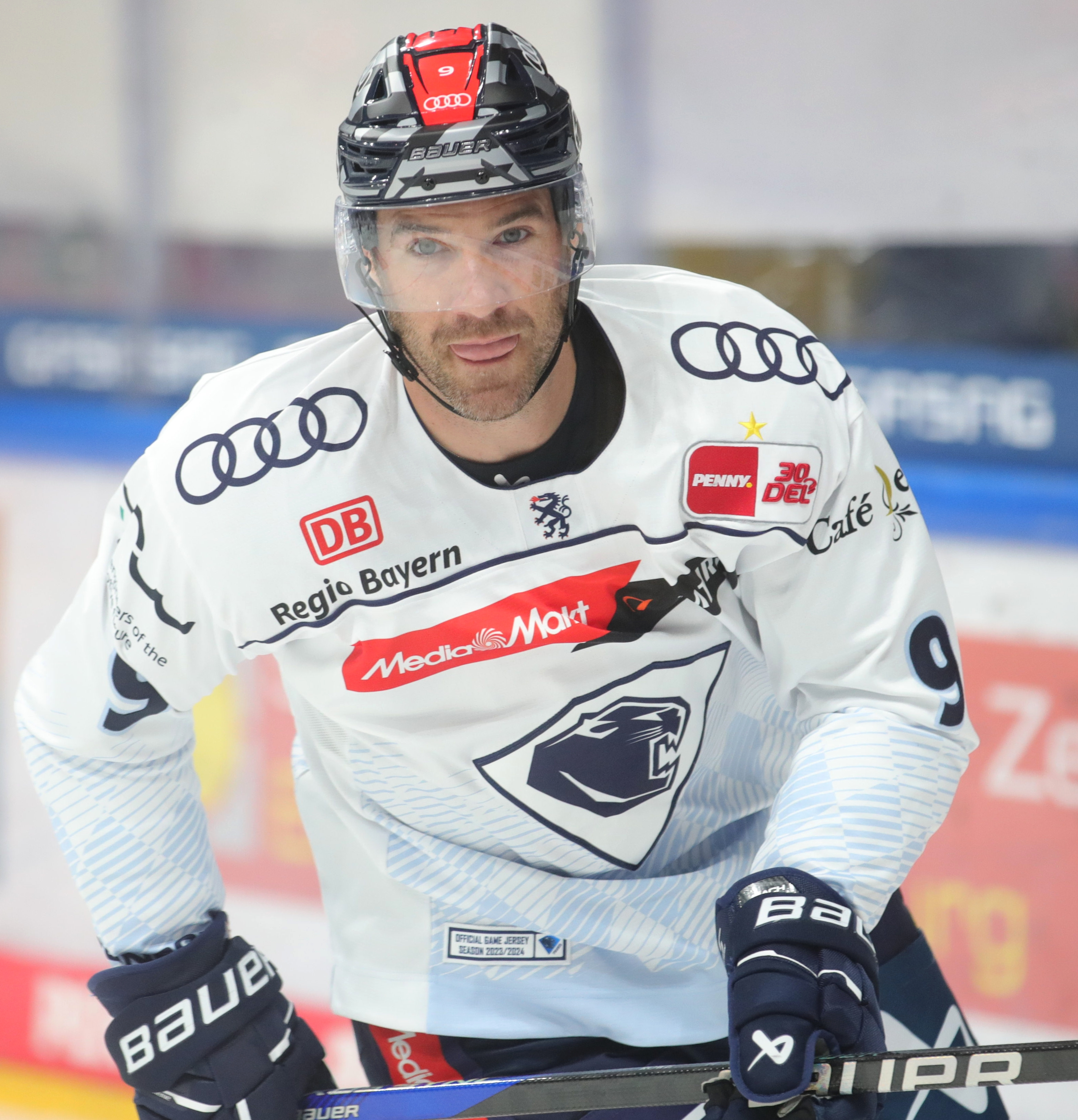
- Rowe in 2023
- Born: January 22, 1988 (age 38) Spring Lake, Michigan, U.S.
- Height: 6 ft 2 in (188 cm)
- Weight: 181 lb (82 kg; 12 st 13 lb)
- Position: Winger
- Shoots: Left
- ICEHL team Former teams: EC Red Bull Salzburg; Adirondack Phantoms; Norfolk Admirals; Hartford Wolf Pack; Charlotte Checkers; Bridgeport Sound Tigers; Mora IK; SC Rapperswil-Jona Lakers; ERC Ingolstadt
- NHL draft: Undrafted
- Playing career: 2010–present

Andrew Rowe (born January 22, 1988) is an American professional ice hockey forward. He is currently under contract with EC Red Bull Salzburg of the ICE Hockey League (ICEHL).

== Early life ==
Rowe was born in Spring Lake, Michigan. From 2005 to 2007, he played junior hockey with the Sioux City Musketeers. Rowe played NCAA college hockey with Michigan State University scoring 49 points in 94 games.

== Playing career ==
On May 7, 2010, Rowe signed a professional contract with the Philadelphia Flyers organization. He was assigned to start the 2010–11 season in the American Hockey League with the Adirondack Phantoms.

He started the 2013–14 season with the Greenville Road Warriors of the ECHL but was promoted to the Hartford Wolf Pack of the American Hockey League after scoring three goals with one assist in his first two games for Greenville.

On September 5, 2014, the South Carolina Stingrays of the ECHL announced that they had signed Rowe to a one-year contract.

On July 2, 2015, Rowe secured an AHL contract, agreeing to a one-year deal with the Bridgeport Sound Tigers.

After recording his best statistical season with the Sound Tigers in the 2016–17 campaign with 36 points in 66 games, Rowe signed a one-year contract with Mora IK of the Swedish Hockey League (SHL) on June 3, 2017.

Following four seasons in the Swiss National League with SC Rapperswil-Jona Lakers, Rowe continued his career in Germany by agreeing to a one-year contract with ERC Ingolstadt of the DEL on May 13, 2023.

== Career statistics ==
			Regular season					Playoffs
Season	Team	League	GP	G	A	Pts	PIM	GP	G	A	Pts	PIM
2005–06	Sioux City Musketeers	USHL	50	8	8	16	30	—	—	—	—	—
2006–07	Sioux City Musketeers	USHL	60	19	15	34	28	7	2	1	3	0
2007–08	Michigan State U.	CCHA	21	3	4	7	8	—	—	—	—	—
2008–09	Michigan State U.	CCHA	35	6	8	14	14	—	—	—	—	—
2009–10	Michigan State U.	CCHA	38	17	11	28	38	—	—	—	—	—
2010–11	Adirondack Phantoms	AHL	55	7	5	12	20	—	—	—	—	—
2010–11	Greenville Road Warriors	ECHL	10	6	2	8	2	11	3	3	6	2
2011–12	Adirondack Phantoms	AHL	34	8	3	11	6	—	—	—	—	—
2011–12	Greenville Road Warriors	ECHL	2	0	0	0	0	—	—	—	—	—
2012–13	Elmira Jackals	ECHL	66	29	43	72	43	6	4	4	8	2
2012–13	Norfolk Admirals	AHL	5	0	1	1	4	—	—	—	—	—
2013–14	Greenville Road Warriors	ECHL	64	31	35	66	22	18	4	12	16	2
2013–14	Hartford Wolf Pack	AHL	7	2	1	3	4	—	—	—	—	—
2014–15	South Carolina Stingrays	ECHL	44	17	39	56	22	27	15	19	34	14
2014–15	Charlotte Checkers	AHL	28	1	4	5	8	—	—	—	—	—
2015–16	Bridgeport Sound Tigers	AHL	11	7	1	8	2	—	—	—	—	—
2015–16	South Carolina Stingrays	ECHL	28	7	14	21	8	—	—	—	—	—
2016–17	Bridgeport Sound Tigers	AHL	66	13	23	36	26	—	—	—	—	—
2017–18	Mora IK	SHL	50	9	10	19	37	—	—	—	—	—
2018–19	Mora IK	SHL	46	15	18	33	28	—	—	—	—	—
2019–20	SC Rapperswil-Jona Lakers	NL	48	13	20	33	45	—	—	—	—	—
2020–21	SC Rapperswil-Jona Lakers	NL	43	13	18	31	48	11	2	4	6	6
2021–22	SC Rapperswil-Jona Lakers	NL	42	7	15	22	51	—	—	—	—	—
2022–23	SC Rapperswil-Jona Lakers	NL	48	9	19	28	8	6	2	1	3	2
2023–24	ERC Ingolstadt	DEL	44	14	9	23	20	—	—	—	—	—
AHL totals			206	38	38	76	70	—	—	—	—	—
