= Michal Čajkovský =

Slovak ice hockey player (born 1992)

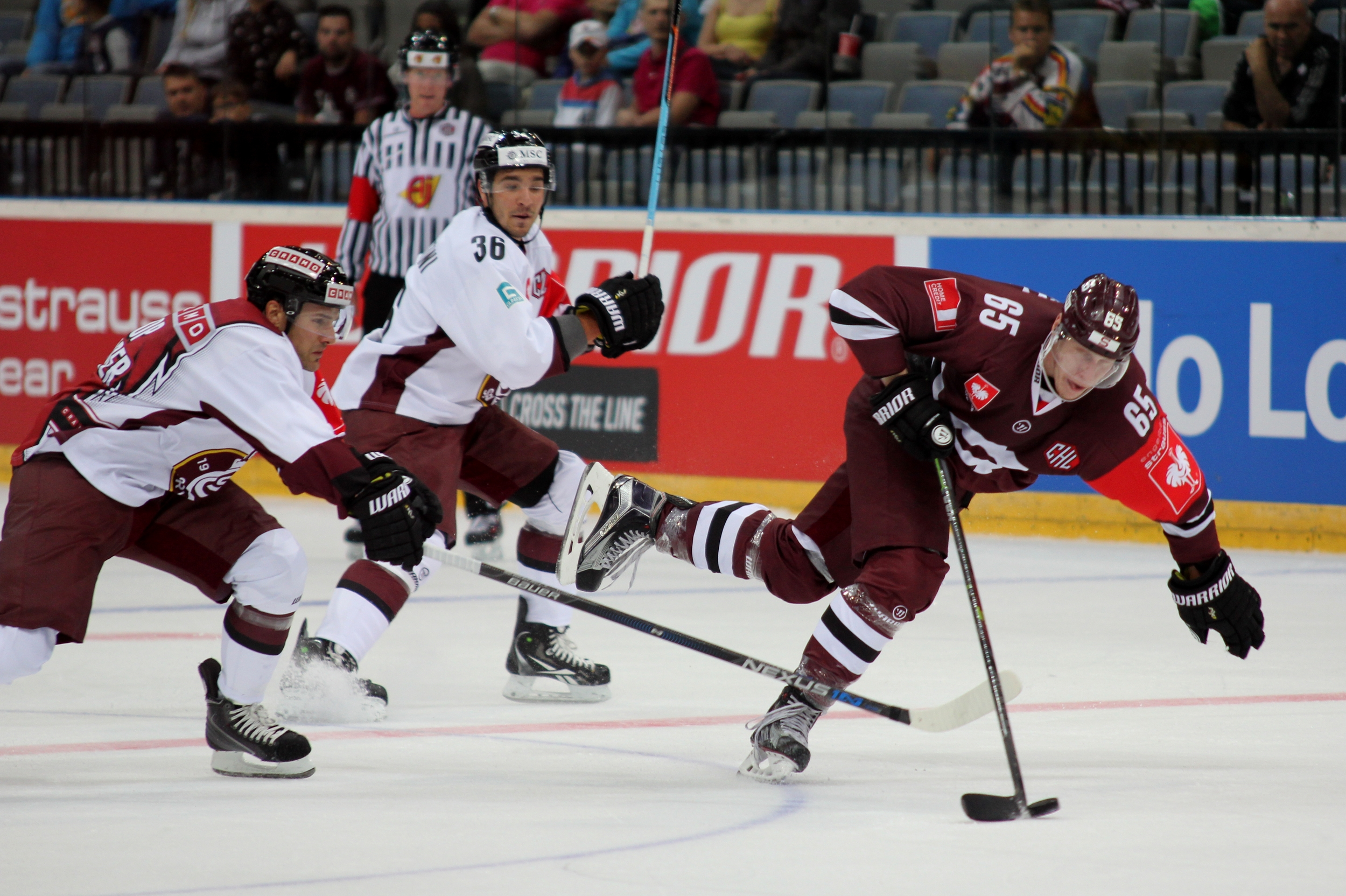
- Born: 6 May 1992 (age 34) Skalica, Czechoslovakia
- Height: 6 ft 4 in (193 cm)
- Weight: 236 lb (107 kg; 16 st 12 lb)
- Position: Defence
- Shoots: Left
- Slovak Extraliga team Former teams: Vlci Žilina; HC Slovan Bratislava; HK Orange 20; Hershey Bears; HC Sparta Praha; Avtomobilist Yekaterinburg; Charlotte Checkers; Dynamo Moscow; Sibir Novosibirsk; Spartak Moscow; HC Ambrì-Piotta; Traktor Chelyabinsk
- National team: Slovakia
- NHL draft: Undrafted
- Playing career: 2009–present

Michal Čajkovský (born 6 May 1992) is a Slovak professional ice hockey defenceman who is currently playing for Vlci Žilina of the Slovak Extraliga.

== Playing career ==
Čajkovský made his European Elite debut during the 2009–10 season playing in the Slovak Extraliga with HC Slovan Bratislava. Undrafted, Čajkovský played major junior hockey with the Kingston Frontenacs and the Ottawa 67's of the Ontario Hockey League.

He spent the 2013–14 season, his first professional North American season, in the ECHL with the Reading Royals, on loan from the Hershey Bears of the AHL. He scored an impressive 14 goals and 36 points in 66 games to earn a selection to the ECHL All-Rookie Team. Čajkovský was re-signed by the Bears to a second one-year contract on 15 August 2014.

On 19 June 2015, Čajkovský returned to Europe and signed a one-year contract with Czech Extraliga team, HC Sparta Praha. In the 2015–16 season, Čajkovský made an immediate impact from the blueline with Sparta, compiling 11 goals and 28 points in 49 games.

After signing an extension to continue with Praha in the 2016–17 season, Čajkovský continued his upward development leading the defense in scoring with 12 points in 19 games before he opted for a mid-season transfer, having gained the attention of Russian-based, Avtomobilist Yekaterinburg of the KHL on 27 November 2016.

After attending the Carolina Hurricanes' training camp on a try-out basis, the club signed Čajkovský to a one-year, two-way contract worth $650,000 on 27 September 2018. He was among the last cuts re-assigned to begin the 2018–19 season with AHL affiliate, the Charlotte Checkers. While a fixture on the Checkers blueline, Čajkovský recorded 4 points in 23 games without a recall to the Hurricanes. On 28 December 2018, Čajkovský was placed on unconditional waivers by the Hurricanes in order to mutually terminate his contract in order to return to Europe. He was soon signed to a two-year contract to resume play in the KHL with HC Dynamo Moscow.

Čajkovský played two seasons with HC Sibir Novosibirsk before leaving to sign a two-year contract to remain in the KHL with Spartak Moscow on 3 May 2023.

== International play ==
Medal record

Representing Slovakia

Ice hockey

Olympic Games
Bronze medal – third place	2022 Beijing	

Čajkovský participated at the 2012 World Junior Ice Hockey Championships as a member of the Slovakia men's national junior ice hockey team.

== Career statistics ==
=== Regular season and playoffs ===
			Regular season					Playoffs
Season	Team	League	GP	G	A	Pts	PIM	GP	G	A	Pts	PIM
2008–09	HC Slovan Bratislava	SVK U18	52	17	13	30	121	—	—	—	—	—
2008–09	HC Slovan Bratislava	SVK U20	1	0	0	0	0	—	—	—	—	—
2009–10	HC Slovan Bratislava	SVK U20	26	4	11	15	95	2	0	2	2	2
2009–10	HC Slovan Bratislava	Slovak	15	0	0	0	4	3	0	0	0	0
2009–10	HK Orange 20	Slovak	11	1	0	1	6	—	—	—	—	—
2010–11	Kingston Frontenacs	OHL	67	4	11	15	82	5	0	1	1	16
2011–12	Ottawa 67's	OHL	59	3	18	21	120	18	0	5	5	14
2012–13	Ottawa 67's	OHL	66	10	24	34	89	—	—	—	—	—
2013–14	Reading Royals	ECHL	66	14	22	36	28	4	0	0	0	0
2014–15	South Carolina Stingrays	ECHL	25	3	9	12	30	27	7	11	18	18
2014–15	Hershey Bears	AHL	13	0	2	2	31	—	—	—	—	—
2015–16	HC Sparta Praha	ELH	49	11	17	28	92	12	1	4	5	12
2016–17	HC Sparta Praha	ELH	19	7	5	12	22	—	—	—	—	—
2016–17	Avtomobilist Yekaterinburg	KHL	20	5	10	15	6	—	—	—	—	—
2017–18	Avtomobilist Yekaterinburg	KHL	43	7	12	19	38	4	0	2	2	0
2018–19	Charlotte Checkers	AHL	23	1	3	4	18	—	—	—	—	—
2018–19	Dynamo Moscow	KHL	12	0	2	2	32	11	2	2	4	8
2019–20	Dynamo Moscow	KHL	58	9	22	31	72	6	2	2	4	2
2020–21	Dynamo Moscow	KHL	58	12	14	26	36	10	1	5	6	10
2021–22	Dynamo Moscow	KHL	2	0	0	0	4	—	—	—	—	—
2021–22	Sibir Novosibirsk	KHL	40	3	9	12	32	5	1	3	4	2
2022–23	Sibir Novosibirsk	KHL	59	7	10	17	30	5	1	0	1	2
2023–24	Spartak Moscow	KHL	61	9	25	34	38	10	3	0	3	4
2024–25	Spartak Moscow	KHL	40	2	12	14	22	—	—	—	—	—
2025–26	HC Ambrì–Piotta	NL	6	0	0	0	0	—	—	—	—	—
2025–26	Traktor Chelyabinsk	KHL	16	2	3	5	40	5	1	0	1	7
KHL totals			409	56	119	175	350	56	11	14	25	35

=== International ===
Year	Team	Event	Result	GP	G	A	Pts	PIM
2010	Slovakia	WJC18	8th	6	0	0	0	6
2012	Slovakia	WJC	6th	6	0	0	0	12
2017	Slovakia	WC	14th	7	0	1	1	0
2018	Slovakia	OG	11th	4	0	1	1	31
2018	Slovakia	WC	9th	7	1	1	2	6
2019	Slovakia	WC	9th	7	2	0	2	2
2022	Slovakia	OG	3rd place, bronze medalist(s)	7	0	1	1	0
Junior totals				12	0	0	0	18
Senior totals				32	3	4	7	39

== Awards and honors ==
Award	Year
ECHL
All-Rookie Team	2013–14
