= Colton Beck =

Canadian ice hockey player (born 1990)

- Born: June 10, 1990 (age 36) Langley, British Columbia, Canada
- Height: 5 ft 11 in (180 cm)
- Weight: 187 lb (85 kg; 13 st 5 lb)
- Position: Left wing
- Shoots: Left
- Eliteserien team Former teams: Stavanger Oilers; St. John's IceCaps; Iowa Wild; Stockton Heat
- NHL draft: Undrafted
- Playing career: 2014–present

Colton Beck (born June 10, 1990) is a Canadian professional ice hockey player who is currently playing with Stavanger Oilers of the Eliteserien.

== Playing career ==
Prior to playing for the Alaska Nanooks, Beck played for the Langley Chiefs of the British Columbia Hockey League (BCHL). After completion of his college career, he signed with the Idaho Steelheads of the ECHL in 2014. In January 2016, Beck signed with the Iowa Wild of the American Hockey League (AHL).

During the 2018–19 season, on November 1, 2018, Beck signed a two-year, two-way contract with Iowa's parent affiliate, the Minnesota Wild of the National Hockey League (NHL).

As a free agent after five seasons with the Iowa Wild, Beck was left unsigned with the delayed 2020–21 North American season due to the COVID-19 pandemic. On December 10, 2020, Beck agreed to a one-year contract with German second-tier club, EV Landshut of the DEL2, however with concerns over his family's health with the birth of a newborn, and the commencement of a lockdown through Germany, Beck was released from his contract on December 16, 2020.

On February 12, 2021, having returned to Canada, Beck was signed to a professional tryout contract with the Stockton Heat of the AHL. Remaining with the Heat for the shortened 2020–21 season, Beck collected 1 goal and 6 points in 21 games.

As a free agent, Beck decided to recommit to a European career, agreeing to a one-year contract with Austrian-based club, Dornbirn Bulldogs of the ICEHL, on August 25, 2021.

In June 2022, he signed for Norwegian Eliteserien club Stavanger Oilers. In the last game of the 2022–23 season, Beck scored two goals as Stavanger Oilers beat Storhamar 3–0 to become Norwegian champions.

== Personal life ==
Beck's father, Murray, was drafted 104th overall by the Houston Aeros in the 1974 WHA Amateur Draft. His uncle, Barry, played in the NHL from 1977 to 1990.

== Career statistics ==
			Regular season					Playoffs
Season	Team	League	GP	G	A	Pts	PIM	GP	G	A	Pts	PIM
2006–07	Langley Chiefs	BCHL	—	—	—	—	—	3	0	0	0	0
2007–08	Langley Chiefs	BCHL	46	4	6	10	27	12	3	1	4	0
2008–09	Langley Chiefs	BCHL	60	36	27	63	38	4	2	1	3	4
2009–10	Langley Chiefs	BCHL	60	39	47	86	48	10	3	10	13	2
2010–11	U. of Alaska-Fairbanks	CCHA	38	4	12	16	16	—	—	—	—	—
2011–12	U. of Alaska-Fairbanks	CCHA	36	13	12	25	22	—	—	—	—	—
2012–13	U. of Alaska-Fairbanks	CCHA	35	11	10	21	8	—	—	—	—	—
2013–14	U. of Alaska-Fairbanks	WCHA	37	14	25	39	35	—	—	—	—	—
2013–14	St. John's IceCaps	AHL	3	0	0	0	0	—	—	—	—	—
2014–15	Idaho Steelheads	ECHL	65	18	31	49	34	6	4	1	5	2
2015–16	Idaho Steelheads	ECHL	18	9	14	23	21	—	—	—	—	—
2015–16	Iowa Wild	AHL	52	8	13	21	12	—	—	—	—	—
2016–17	Iowa Wild	AHL	74	5	16	21	24	—	—	—	—	—
2017–18	Iowa Wild	AHL	72	10	18	28	28	—	—	—	—	—
2018–19	Iowa Wild	AHL	74	14	9	23	34	11	1	0	1	0
2019–20	Iowa Wild	AHL	47	4	7	11	10	—	—	—	—	—
2020–21	Stockton Heat	AHL	21	1	5	6	4	—	—	—	—	—
2021–22	Dornbirn Bulldogs	ICEHL	45	13	20	33	22	—	—	—	—	—
2021–22	Ilves	Liiga	7	1	2	3	0	4	0	0	0	0
2022–23	Stavanger Oilers	NOR	45	12	20	32	18	15	6	7	13	6
AHL totals			343	42	68	110	112	11	1	0	1	0
