= Justin Mercier =

American ice hockey player (born 1987)

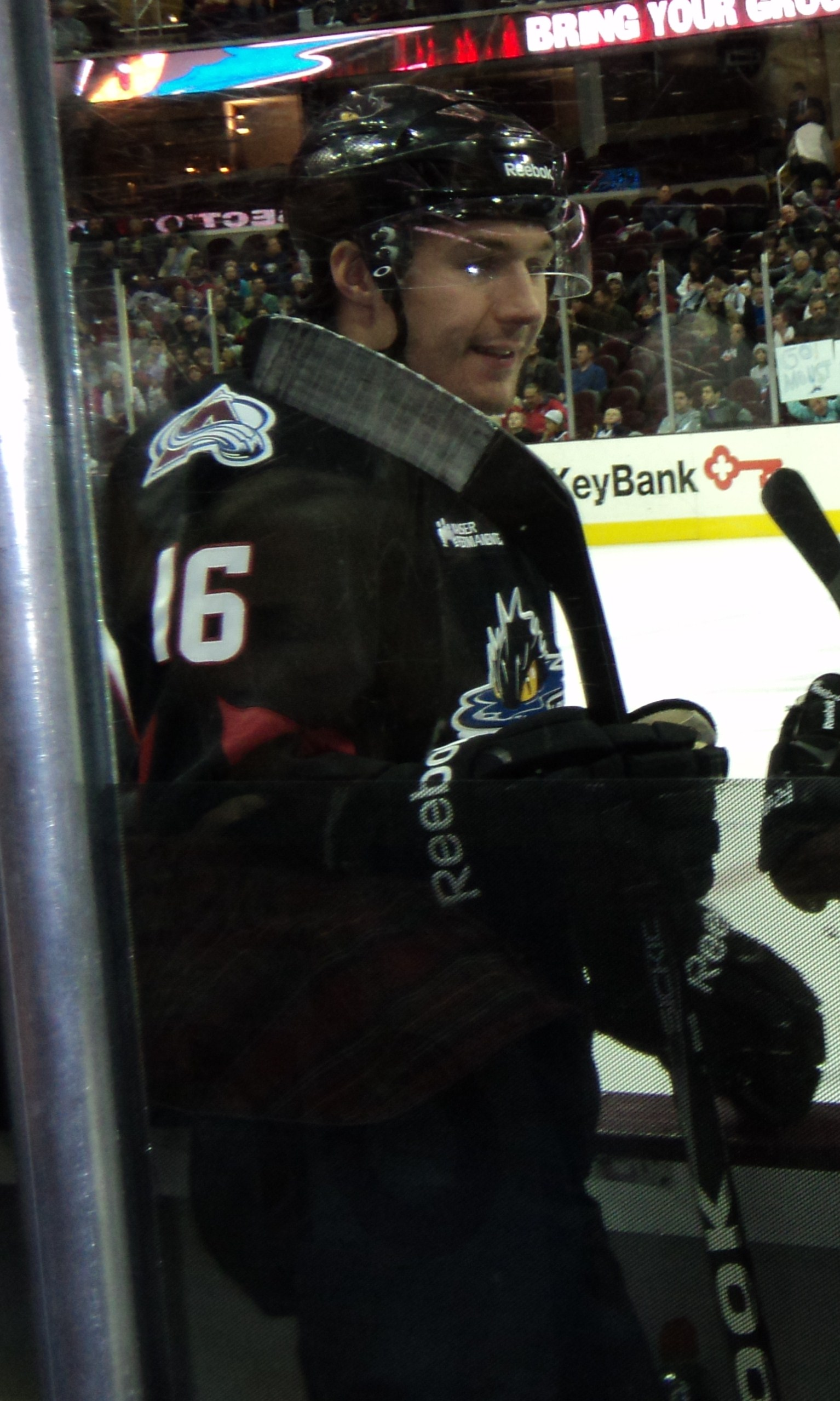
- Born: June 25, 1987 (age 39) Erie, Pennsylvania, U.S.
- Height: 5 ft 11 in (180 cm)
- Weight: 190 lb (86 kg; 13 st 8 lb)
- Position: Left wing
- Shot: Left
- Played for: Colorado Avalanche; Grizzly Adams Wolfsburg; HC Gherdëina
- NHL draft: 168th overall, 2005; Colorado Avalanche
- Playing career: 2009–2016

Justin L. Mercier (born June 25, 1987) is an American former professional ice hockey left wing who played in the National Hockey League with the Colorado Avalanche.

== Playing career ==
=== Amateur ===
Mercier was drafted 168th overall in the 2005 NHL entry draft by the Colorado Avalanche. Mercier was drafted from the United States National Development Team Program after previously playing with the St. Louis Heartland Eagles in the USHL.

Mercier committed to Miami University in the summer of 2004, and after recording 10 points in his freshman year, Mercier developed into an aggressive scoring forward in the following years for Miami. As a senior Mercier was named the West regional MVP as he helped guide the Redhawks to the Frozen Four, losing the 2008–09 National Championship game 4–3 in overtime to Boston University.

=== Professional ===
On July 10, 2009, Mercier was signed to a three-year entry-level contract with the Colorado Avalanche. Mercier was then assigned to the Avalanche's AHL affiliate, the Lake Erie Monsters, to start his first professional season in 2009–10. Expected to provide an energetic, physical presence, Mercier got off to a slow start recording a single assist in 24 games with Lake Erie before he was surprisingly recalled to the Avalanche on December 8, 2009. He made his NHL debut the next night in a 1–0 loss to the Minnesota Wild on December 9, 2009. Mercier returned to his Native Erie and on the turn of the year finally scored his first professional goals in a 3–2 win over the Hamilton Bulldogs on January 2, 2010. In his second recall to the Avalanche, Justin scored his first NHL goal in a 5–3 loss to the Nashville Predators on February 4, 2010.

In the following two seasons, Mercier became a fixture among the Monsters as a two-way checking line forward. Without a recall to the Avalanche, Mercier improved his goal totals with the Monsters each season and after his three-year tenure became Lake Erie's All-time games leader with 220.

Without an offer of an extension with the Avalanche and uncertainty due to the 2012 NHL lockout, Mercier was without a club going into the 2012–13 season. Two months into the season proper on October 28, 2012, Mercier was invited to train and try-out with German club EHC Wolfsburg of the DEL. On October 31, Mercier made his debut for the Grizzly Adams in front of the Wolfsburg fans in a 5–3 defeat to ERC Ingolstadt. Mercier struggled to translate his game offensively, but in a checking role contributed with 5 points in 35 games.

Mercier returned to North America in the off-season and belatedly signed a one-year contract in the ECHL with the Idaho Steelheads on October 7, 2013. In the 2013–14 season, Mercier appeared in 43 games with the Steelheads to post 18 goals and 30 points. His impact with the Steelheads was diminished as he was loaned on two separate occasions to AHL clubs, the Iowa Wild and the Bridgeport Sound Tigers.

On August 19, 2014, Mercier continued in the ECHL, signing to a one-year contract with the Toledo Walleye. Mercier regained his scoring touch in accumulating 43 points in 46 games with the Walleye. He was loaned to AHL club, the Rochester Americans during the 2014–15 season, appearing in 16 games for 4 points before he returned to the Walleye.

As a free agent on August 6, 2015, Mercier returned for a second stint in Europe in joining former Walleye teammate, Shane Sims, in signing a one-year contract with Italian club, HC Gherdëina of the Italian Serie A.

== International play ==
Medal record

Representing United States

Ice hockey

IIHF U18 Championships
Gold medal – first place	2005 České Budějovice	

A part of the U.S. development program, Mercier was named to the United States Team for the 2005 U18 World Championships. Far from the most skilled player, he was praised for his tenacity and tireless work as he recorded 1 assist in 6 games helping the U.S. capture Gold. In the gold medal game, a 5–1 victory over Canada, Mercier gained notoriety when he was assessed a match penalty and ejected in the third period following a dangerous hit along the boards against Colton Yellow Horn.

== Career statistics ==
=== Regular season and playoffs ===
			Regular season					Playoffs
Season	Team	League	GP	G	A	Pts	PIM	GP	G	A	Pts	PIM
2003–04	Lincoln Stars	USHL	60	12	9	21	49	—	—	—	—	—
2004–05	U.S. NTDP U18	USDP	26	1	7	8	31	—	—	—	—	—
2004–05	U.S. NTDP Juniors	NAHL	16	4	3	7	33	—	—	—	—	—
2005–06	Miami RedHawks	CCHA	35	3	7	10	32	—	—	—	—	—
2006–07	Miami RedHawks	CCHA	40	10	15	25	59	—	—	—	—	—
2007–08	Miami RedHawks	CCHA	42	25	15	40	42	—	—	—	—	—
2008–09	Miami RedHawks	CCHA	40	14	15	29	58	—	—	—	—	—
2009–10	Lake Erie Monsters	AHL	64	13	10	23	54	—	—	—	—	—
2009–10	Colorado Avalanche	NHL	9	1	1	2	0	—	—	—	—	—
2010–11	Lake Erie Monsters	AHL	80	12	16	28	66	7	3	2	5	2
2011–12	Lake Erie Monsters	AHL	76	14	11	25	79	—	—	—	—	—
2012–13	Grizzly Adams Wolfsburg	DEL	35	2	3	5	49	12	2	2	4	8
2013–14	Idaho Steelheads	ECHL	43	18	12	30	35	11	2	2	4	12
2013–14	Iowa Wild	AHL	15	2	3	5	14	—	—	—	—	—
2013–14	Bridgeport Sound Tigers	AHL	4	0	0	0	0	—	—	—	—	—
2014–15	Toledo Walleye	ECHL	46	22	21	43	45	20	8	4	12	14
2014–15	Rochester Americans	AHL	16	2	2	4	8	—	—	—	—	—
2015–16	HC Gherdëina	ITA	39	20	23	43	72	5	3	7	10	2
AHL totals			255	43	42	85	221	7	3	2	5	2
NHL totals			9	1	1	2	0	—	—	—	—	—

=== International ===
Year	Team	Event	Result	GP	G	A	Pts	PIM
2005	United States	WJC18	1st place, gold medalist(s)	6	0	1	1	29
Junior totals				6	0	1	1	29
