= Joe Cannata =

American ice hockey player (born 1990)

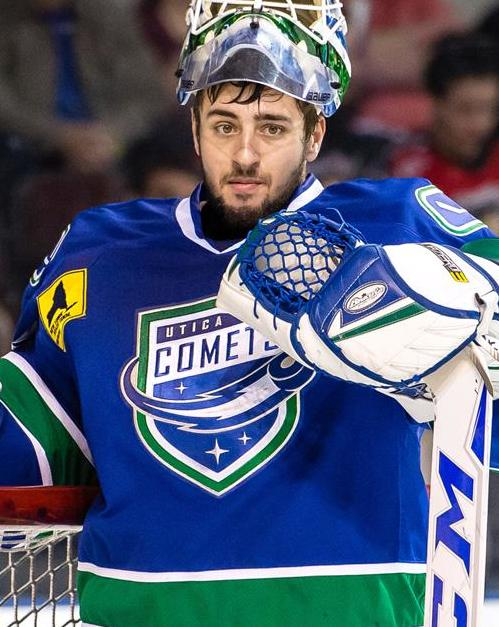
- Cannata with the Utica Comets in 2015
- Born: January 2, 1990 (age 36) Wakefield, Massachusetts, U.S.
- Height: 6 ft 1 in (185 cm)
- Weight: 201 lb (91 kg; 14 st 5 lb)
- Position: Goaltender
- Catches: Left
- ECHL team Former teams: Norfolk Admirals; Chicago Wolves; Utica Comets; Hershey Bears; San Antonio Rampage; IK Oskarshamn; Löwen Frankfurt
- NHL draft: 173rd overall, 2009; Vancouver Canucks
- Playing career: 2011–present

Joe Cannata (born January 2, 1990) is an American professional ice hockey goaltender who is currently playing with the Norfolk Admirals in the ECHL. Cannata was selected by the Vancouver Canucks in the sixth round, 173rd overall, of the 2009 NHL entry draft after his freshman season at Merrimack where he played in 23 games. Internationally, Cannata has represented the United States at the IIHF World Under-18 Championship in Kazan, Russia.

== Playing career ==
=== Amateur ===
Joe Cannata played high school hockey at Boston College High School. In his junior year he helped lead the team to its second consecutive Super Eight Championship. Shortly after the victory he was invited to attend a try out for the U-18 US NTDP. This was followed by an invitation to play for Merrimack College in the Hockey East Conference.

Cannata made his collegiate debut with the Merrimack Warriors on October 18, 2008 against Army. He stopped all 44 shots to become the first goaltender in school history to register a shutout in his first career game. In his junior and senior years he was regularly regarded as one of the top goalies in the Hockey East Association conference. He would help lead the warriors to the NCAA tournament in 2011 winning 25 games that year. Finishing his time with an overall record of 59-46-16 setting the program record for most wins at the D1 level.

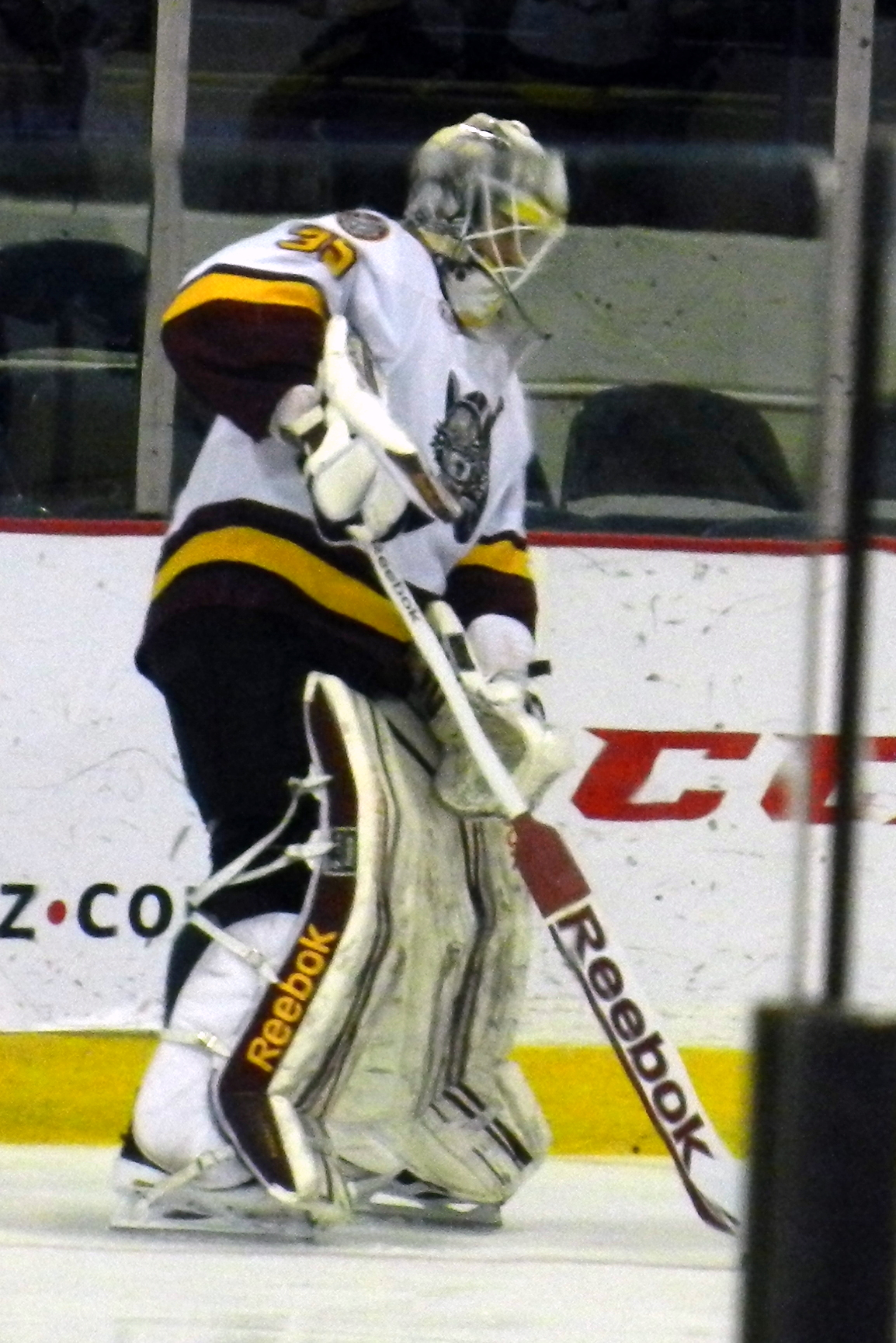
Cannata in 2012 while playing for the Chicago Wolves.

=== Professional ===
On March 21, 2012, Cannata signed an entry-level contract with the Vancouver Canucks. On April 2, 2012 he signed an amateur try-out contract with Vancouver's AHL affiliate Chicago Wolves. He made his professional hockey debut on April 15 for the final regular season game for Chicago. Cannata made 38 saves and earned the 4–2 win over the Peoria Rivermen. He was subsequently released from his tryout contract on April 16 as he was ineligible to play for the team in the playoffs. Later that year, Cannata returned to Merrimack where he completed his business degree. On April 25, 2013 Cannata was called up to parent club, the Vancouver Canucks.

On July 1, 2016, Cannata left the Canucks as a free agent to sign a one-year, two-way deal with the Washington Capitals. In the 2016–17 season, Cannata was assigned to AHL affiliate the Hershey Bears. In 22 games with the Bears, Cannata was victorious in 11 games however was relegated to third-string status and assigned to ECHL affiliate, the South Carolina Stingrays on February 14, 2017. At the NHL trade deadline, he was dealt by the Capitals to the Colorado Avalanche in exchange for Cody Corbett on March 1, 2017. He was directly assigned to add a veteran presence to AHL affiliate, the San Antonio Rampage.

On July 1, 2017, Cannata as a free agent opted to remain with the Avalanche, agreeing to a one-year, two way contract. Signed to add an organizational depth to the goaltending position, Cannata was recalled early in the 2017–18 season, to accompany the team to Sweden for two regular season games against the Ottawa Senators. Upon the club's return to Denver, Cannata was re-assigned to secondary affiliate, the Colorado Eagles of the ECHL. Cannata posted a league best .931 save percentage, collecting 21 wins through 28 games on route to helping the Eagles capture their second successive Kelly Cup.

On July 2, 2018, Cannata re-signed to continue his association with the Avalanche on a one-year, two-way contract. In the 2018–19 season, Cannata played primarily at the ECHL level with the Utah Grizzlies, posting 17 wins in 40 games.

On May 17, 2019, Cannata opted to pursue a European career, and signed a one-year contract with IF Björklöven of the Swedish HockeyAllsvenskan.

As a free agent on August 6, 2020, Cannata signed an initial two-year contract with IK Oskarshamn of the top tiered Swedish Hockey League. Cannata remained with Oskarshamn for three seasons, making 94 regular season appearances and collecting 42 wins.

At the conclusion of his contract with IK Oskarshamn, Cannata left Sweden to sign a one-year contract with German club, Löwen Frankfurt of the Deutsche Eishockey Liga (DEL), on June 9, 2023.

After a lone season in the DEL, Cannata extended his professional career in returning to North American following 5 seasons abroad. He was signed to a contract for the 2024–25 season with the Norfolk Admirals of the ECHL on November 1, 2024.

== Career statistics ==
=== Regular season and playoffs ===
			Regular season									Playoffs
Season	Team	League	GP	W	L	T/OT	MIN	GA	SO	GAA	SV%	GP	W	L	MIN	GA	SO	GAA	SV%
2007–08	U.S. National Team Development Program	U-18	29	16	14	1	1781	76	1	2.56	.899	—	—	—	—	—	—	—	—
2007–08	U.S. National Team Development Program	NAHL	5	3	1	1	307	12	0	2.35	.914	—	—	—	—	—	—	—	—
2008–09	Merrimack College	HE	23	7	10	4	1353	53	2	2.35	.918	—	—	—	—	—	—	—	—
2009–10	Merrimack College	HE	24	10	13	1	1362	69	1	3.04	.902	—	—	—	—	—	—	—	—
2010–11	Merrimack College	HE	39	25	10	4	2251	93	1	2.48	.911	—	—	—	—	—	—	—	—
2011–12	Merrimack College	HE	36	17	12	7	2182	79	2	2.17	.925	—	—	—	—	—	—	—	—
2011–12	Chicago Wolves	AHL	1	1	0	0	60	2	0	2.00	.950	—	—	—	—	—	—	—	—
2012–13	Kalamazoo Wings	ECHL	7	3	4	0	419	23	0	3.29	.905	—	—	—	—	—	—	—	—
2012–13	Chicago Wolves	AHL	14	6	6	0	747	33	0	2.65	.912	—	—	—	—	—	—	—	—
2013–14	Utica Comets	AHL	28	11	12	1	1484	70	0	2.83	.907	—	—	—	—	—	—	—	—
2014–15	Ontario Reign	ECHL	21	12	6	2	1249	42	1	2.02	.927	9	4	4	515	20	2	2.33	.904
2014–15	Utica Comets	AHL	5	3	2	0	302	10	0	1.99	.932	—	—	—	—	—	—	—	—
2015–16	Utica Comets	AHL	40	20	13	6	2381	100	2	2.52	.909	3	1	1	141	7	0	2.98	.897
2016–17	Hershey Bears	AHL	22	11	5	4	1265	68	0	3.22	.876	—	—	—	—	—	—	—	—
2016–17	South Carolina Stingrays	ECHL	3	3	0	0	180	7	0	2.33	.916	—	—	—	—	—	—	—	—
2016–17	San Antonio Rampage	AHL	6	2	3	0	316	19	0	3.60	.872	—	—	—	—	—	—	—	—
2017–18	Colorado Eagles	ECHL	28	21	5	2	1679	62	2	2.22	.931	24	16	7	1434	61	2	2.55	.913
2017–18	San Antonio Rampage	AHL	5	3	0	1	261	8	1	1.84	.920	—	—	—	—	—	—	—	—
2018–19	Utah Grizzlies	ECHL	40	17	16	6	2355	113	4	2.88	.904	—	—	—	—	—	—	—	—
2019–20	IF Björklöven	Allsv	41	33	8	0	2479	71	6	1.72	.938	2	1	1	119	3	0	1.55	.944
2020–21	IK Oskarshamn	SHL	44	18	24	0	2563	119	1	2.79	.911	—	—	—	—	—	—	—	—
2021–22	IK Oskarshamn	SHL	28	13	15	0	1663	89	0	3.21	.892	1	1	0	60	1	0	1.00	.971
2022–23	IK Oskarshamn	SHL	22	10	11	0	1226	63	0	3.08	.901	—	—	—	—	—	—	—	—
2023–24	Löwen Frankfurt	DEL	27	11	15	0	1587	78	1	2.95	.898	—	—	—	—	—	—	—	—
AHL totals			121	57	41	12	6816	310	3	2.73	.903	3	1	1	141	7	0	2.98	.897

=== International ===
Year	Team	Event	Result	GP	W	L	T	MIN	GA	SO	GAA	SV%
2008	United States	WJC18	3rd place, bronze medalist(s)	2	1	1	0	120	7	0	3.50	.851
Junior totals				2	1	1	0	120	7	0	3.50	.851

== Awards and honors ==
Award	Year
USHS
Boston College High School MVP	2006–2007
College
HE Defensive Player of the Month	November 2010
Walter Brown Award finalist	2010–2011
Hobey Baker Award candidate	2010–2011
HE Defensive Player of the Month	October 2011
HE Defensive Player of the Week	November 7, 2011
HE Defensive Player of the Week	November 14, 2011
All-HE First Team	2011–12
Merrimack team MVP	2011–12
AHCA East Second-Team All-American	2011–12
ECHL
Best SVS% (.931)	2018
Kelly Cup (Colorado Eagles)	2018

== Records ==
=== Merrimack College ===
- Career wins (Hockey East era): 59 (2008–2012)
