= David Marshall (ice hockey) =

American ice hockey player (born 1985)

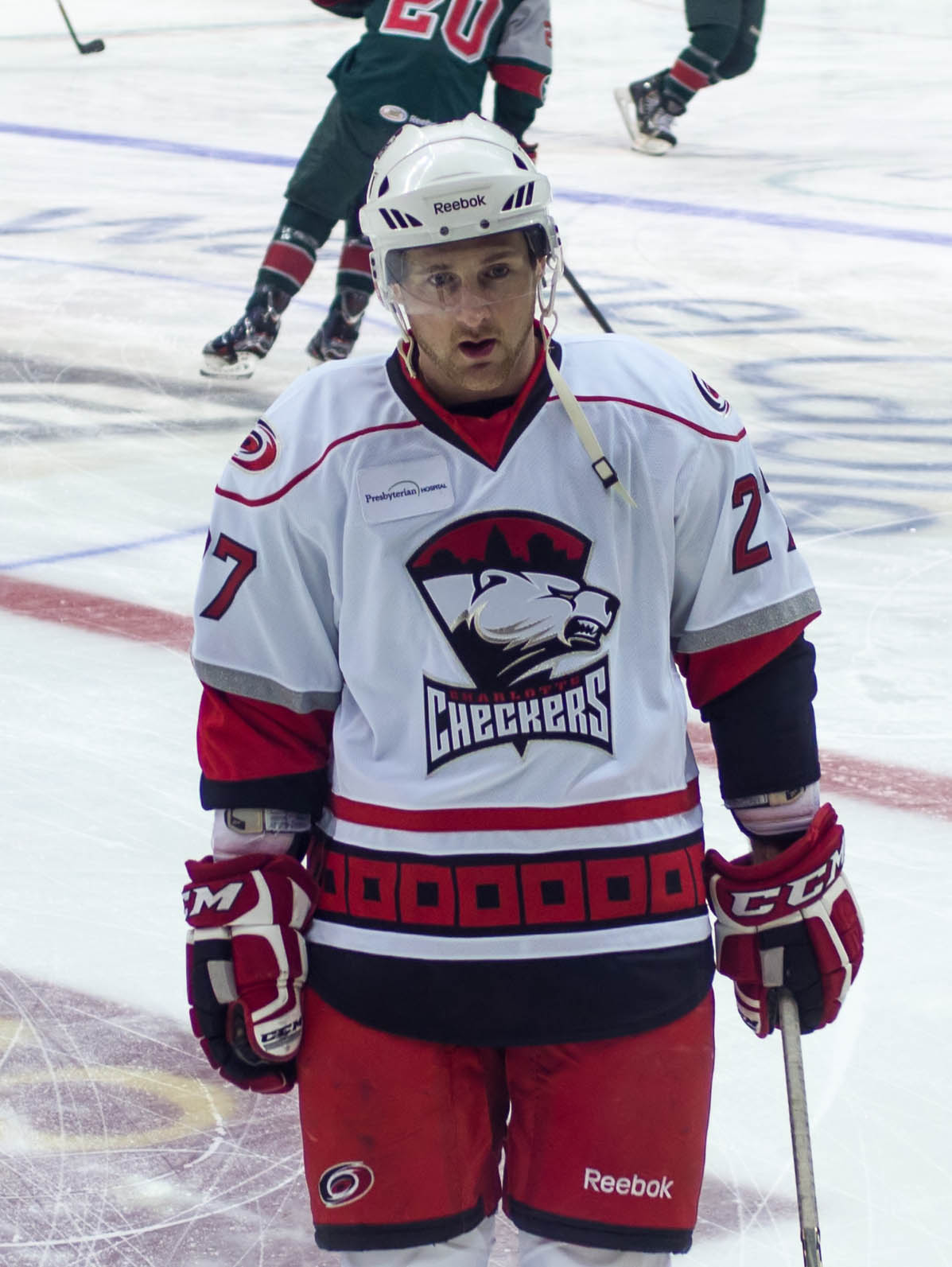
- Born: March 14, 1985 (age 40) Buffalo, Minnesota, U.S.
- Height: 5 ft 11 in (180 cm)
- Weight: 183 lb (83 kg; 13 st 1 lb)
- Position: Forward
- Shot: Right
- Played for: Lake Erie Monsters; Rochester Americans; Worcester Sharks; Wilkes-Barre/Scranton Penguins; San Antonio Rampage; Binghamton Senators; Charlotte Checkers; Utica Comets
- NHL draft: Undrafted
- Playing career: 2009–2015

David Marshall (born March 14, 1985) is an American former professional ice hockey player. Marshall made his professional debut in 2009 and has played for various teams in the AHL and the ECHL until ending his professional career in 2015.

== Playing career ==
Born in Buffalo, Minnesota, Marshall played junior hockey for the Chicago Steel of the United States Hockey League (USHL). After junior, Marshall enrolled at Quinnipiac University, playing four seasons of college hockey. After graduating, Marshall signed with the Lake Erie Monsters, making his professional debut in March 2009.

During the 2011–12 season, Marshall was loaned from the Rio Grande Valley Killer Bees to the San Antonio Rampage in the American Hockey League where he remained for the duration of the season.

On September 6, 2012, Marshall returned to the ECHL, signing a one-year contract with the Reading Royals. During the 2012-13 season, whilst amongst the ECHL top scorers, Marshall was loaned to the Binghamton Senators on February 14, 2013. After a 6-game scoreless stint, Marshall was returned to the Royals briefly before he returned for a second stint in Charlotte, with the Checkers, for the duration of the season. Marshall appeared in 19 regular season and 2 post-season games with the Checkers before he was unable to return to the Royals championship run due to a complete roster. His name will still be engraved on the Kelly Cup.

On August 4, 2013, Marshall re-signed with the Reading Royals on a one-year deal. After two games with the Royals, Marshall was loaned to the Utica Comets where he remained for the duration of the 2013–14 season.

== Career statistics ==
			Regular season					Playoffs
Season	Team	League	GP	G	A	Pts	PIM	GP	G	A	Pts	PIM
2002–03	Chicago Steel	USHL	15	4	3	7	16	—	—	—	—	—
2003–04	Chicago Steel	USHL	58	16	15	31	77	4	1	2	3	14
2004–05	Chicago Steel	USHL	56	20	9	29	107	8	4	1	5	13
2005–06	Quinnipiac University	ECAC	39	22	12	34	78	—	—	—	—	—
2006–07	Quinnipiac University	ECAC	39	17	9	26	65	—	—	—	—	—
2007–08	Quinnipiac University	ECAC	39	12	9	21	42	—	—	—	—	—
2008–09	Quinnipiac University	ECAC	38	22	24	46	81	—	—	—	—	—
2008–09	Lake Erie Monsters	AHL	9	2	3	5	8	—	—	—	—	—
2009–10	Charlotte Checkers	ECHL	55	23	11	34	53	11	4	5	9	9
2009–10	Lake Erie Monsters	AHL	15	2	1	3	11	—	—	—	—	—
2010–11	Wheeling Nailers	ECHL	28	10	12	22	27	—	—	—	—	—
2010–11	Rochester Americans	AHL	9	2	0	2	6	—	—	—	—	—
2010–11	Worcester Sharks	AHL	12	1	1	2	15	—	—	—	—	—
2010–11	Wilkes-Barre/Scranton Penguins	AHL	22	2	3	5	6	11	0	0	0	8
2011–12	Rio Grande Valley Killer Bees	CHL	11	8	4	12	10	—	—	—	—	—
2011–12	San Antonio Rampage	AHL	42	5	4	9	20	9	1	0	1	0
2012–13	Reading Royals	ECHL	55	18	32	50	93	—	—	—	—	—
2012–13	Binghamton Senators	AHL	6	0	0	0	12	—	—	—	—	—
2012–13	Charlotte Checkers	AHL	19	2	4	6	6	2	0	0	0	0
2013–14	Reading Royals	ECHL	2	1	1	2	0	—	—	—	—	—
2013–14	Utica Comets	AHL	66	2	4	6	42	—	—	—	—	—
2014–15	Reading Royals	ECHL	61	23	28	51	52	7	5	3	8	6
2014–15	Binghamton Senators	AHL	4	1	0	1	2	—	—	—	—	—
AHL totals			204	20	19	39	128	22	1	0	1	8
