= Jeff Jakaitis =

American ice hockey player

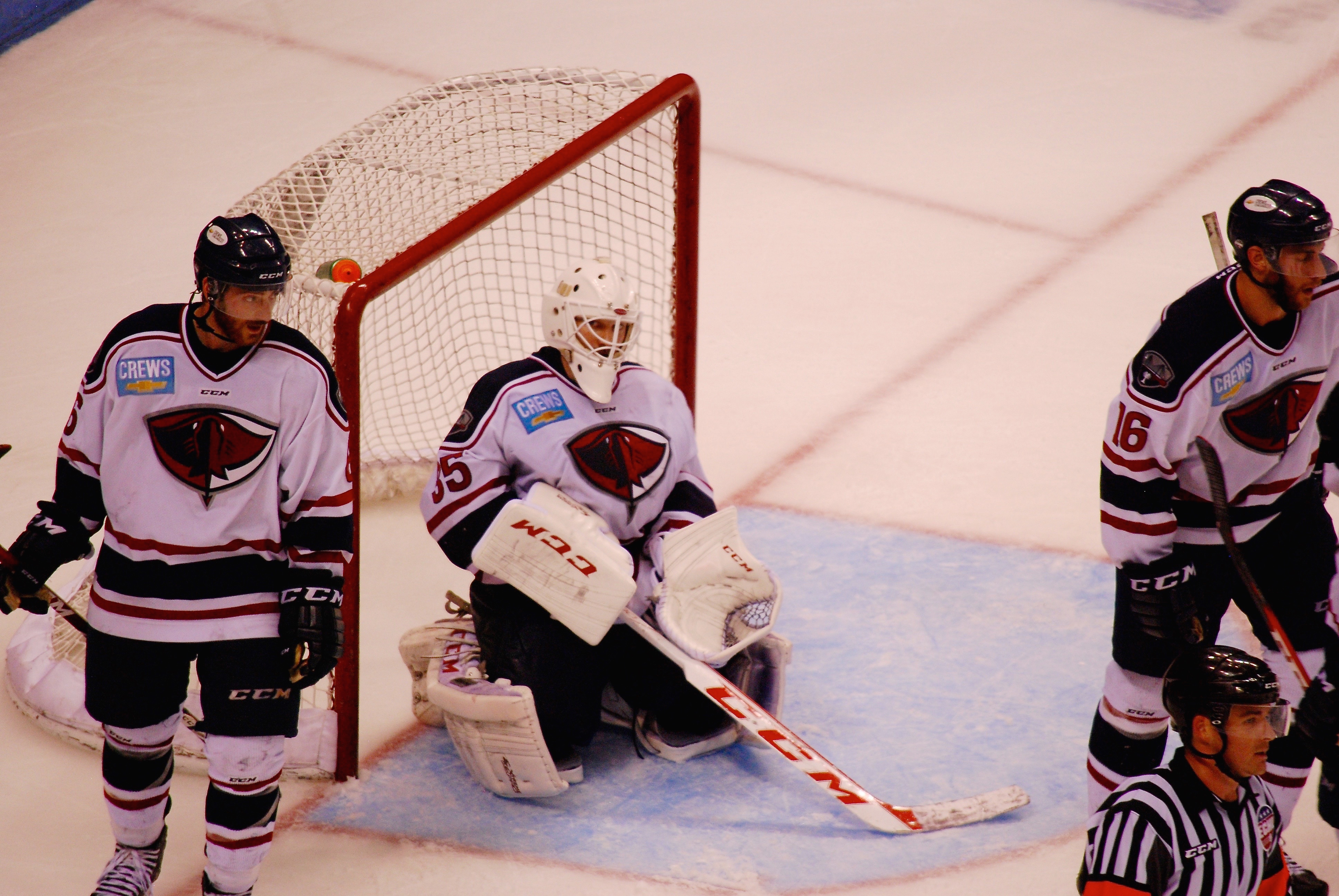
- Jakaitis with the South Carolina Stingrays during the 2015 Kelly Cup playoffs
- Born: June 9, 1983 (age 42) Rochester, Minnesota, U.S.
- Height: 5 ft 10 in (178 cm)
- Weight: 165 lb (75 kg; 11 st 11 lb)
- Position: Goaltender
- Caught: Left
- Played for: South Carolina Stingrays; Portland Pirates; HC Pustertal Wölfe; Worcester Sharks; Providence Bruins; Lørenskog IK; Hartford Wolf Pack
- NHL draft: Undrafted
- Playing career: 2007–2019

Jeff Jakaitis (born June 9, 1983) is an American former professional ice hockey goaltender who last played for the South Carolina Stingrays of the ECHL. He currently plays for the Charleston Warriors Sled Hockey Team.

== Playing career ==
=== College ===
Jakaitis played college hockey for the Lake Superior State Lakers in the CCHA (NCAA Division I). He was named to the All-CCHA First Team at the completion of the 2005–06 season and to the All-CCHA Second team at the completion of the 2006-07.

=== Professional ===
Jakaitis began his professional career in the 2007–08 season with the Columbia Inferno of the ECHL. He played in 36 games in his first pro season posting a 2.92 GAA and .909 save percentage. For the 2008–09 season Jakaitis signed with the Charlotte Checkers and played 47 ECHL games that year along with 1 American Hockey League game for the Portland Pirates.

Jakaitis relocated to Italy to play with HC Pustertal Wölfe of the Elite.A (at the time called Serie A). While with the Italian club he played in 39 games.

After one season in Italy Jakaitis returned to North America by signing with the Dayton Gems of the Central Hockey League for the 2010–11 season playing 42 games with that club and played in the 2011 Central Hockey League All-Star Game. During this season he earned tryouts with the Worcester Sharks and the Portland Pirates but was unsuccessful on both occasions.

For the 2011-12 season he signed with the Rochester Americans but did not play for them during that season as he was reassigned to play with the Gwinnett Gladiators of the ECHL, he played in 26 ECHL games and won the ECHL Goaltender of the Year award for his play.

In 2012-13 Jakaitis started out without a team, but was signed briefly by the Gladiators as an emergency backup before being signed by the South Carolina Stingrays on December 11, 2012. He was signed to a professional tryout contract by the Houston Aeros of the AHL but was returned to the Stingrays the next day without playing a game for the team.

On September 13, 2013 the Stingrays resigned Jakaitis.

From March 7 through March 20, 2015, Jakaitis set the longest shutout streak in the ECHL and minor league hockey with a time of 321 minutes, 46 seconds, just short of the all-time professional hockey record set by Brian Boucher's 332 minutes, 1 second during the 2003-04 NHL season while backstopping the Phoenix Coyotes. During this time the Stingrays would also set a league record with 23 straight wins. Jakaitis would be named the ECHL's Most Valuable Player at the end of the 2014–15 regular season.

On August 17, 2015, Jakaitis left the Stingrays after three seasons and made a second venture to Europe, signing a one-year contract with Norwegian club, Lørenskog IK of the GET-ligaen.

==== Return to the Stingrays and retirement ====
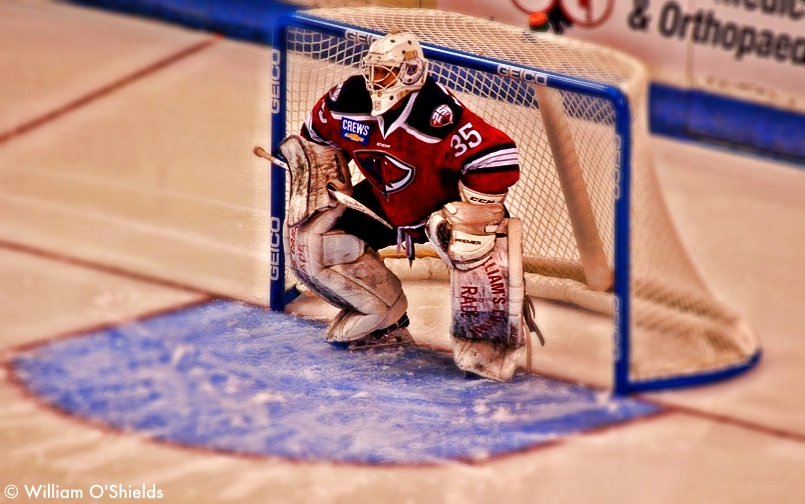
Jakaitis stretching before start of season opener between SC Stringrays and Greenville Swamp Rabbits.

On October 17, 2017, it was officially announced that Jakaitis would be re-joining the South Carolina Stingrays as their starting goaltender. Jakaitis started in goal on the Stingrays season opener on October 20, 2017, and obtained his first win of the season, beating out the Greenville Swamp Rabbits with a score of 4-3.

Following the 2017–18 ECHL season, Jakaitis retired from professional hockey, although he would make one more appearance in February 2019 for the Stingrays.

As of September 2021, Jeff plays for the Charleston Warriors Sled Hockey Team as a forward.

== Awards and honors ==
Award	Year
College
All-CCHA First Team	2005–06
All-CCHA Second Team	2006–07
NCAA Lowes Senior Class All-Americans 1st Team	2006–07
ECHL
Goaltender of the Year	2011–12, 2014–15
All-ECHL First Team	2013–14, 2014–15
Most Valuable Player	2014–15
CHL
All-Star Game	2010–11

Awards and achievements
Preceded by Jordan Sigalet	Perani Cup Champion; 2005-06	Succeeded by Jeff Lerg
