= Mike Little (ice hockey) =

American ice hockey player (born 1987)

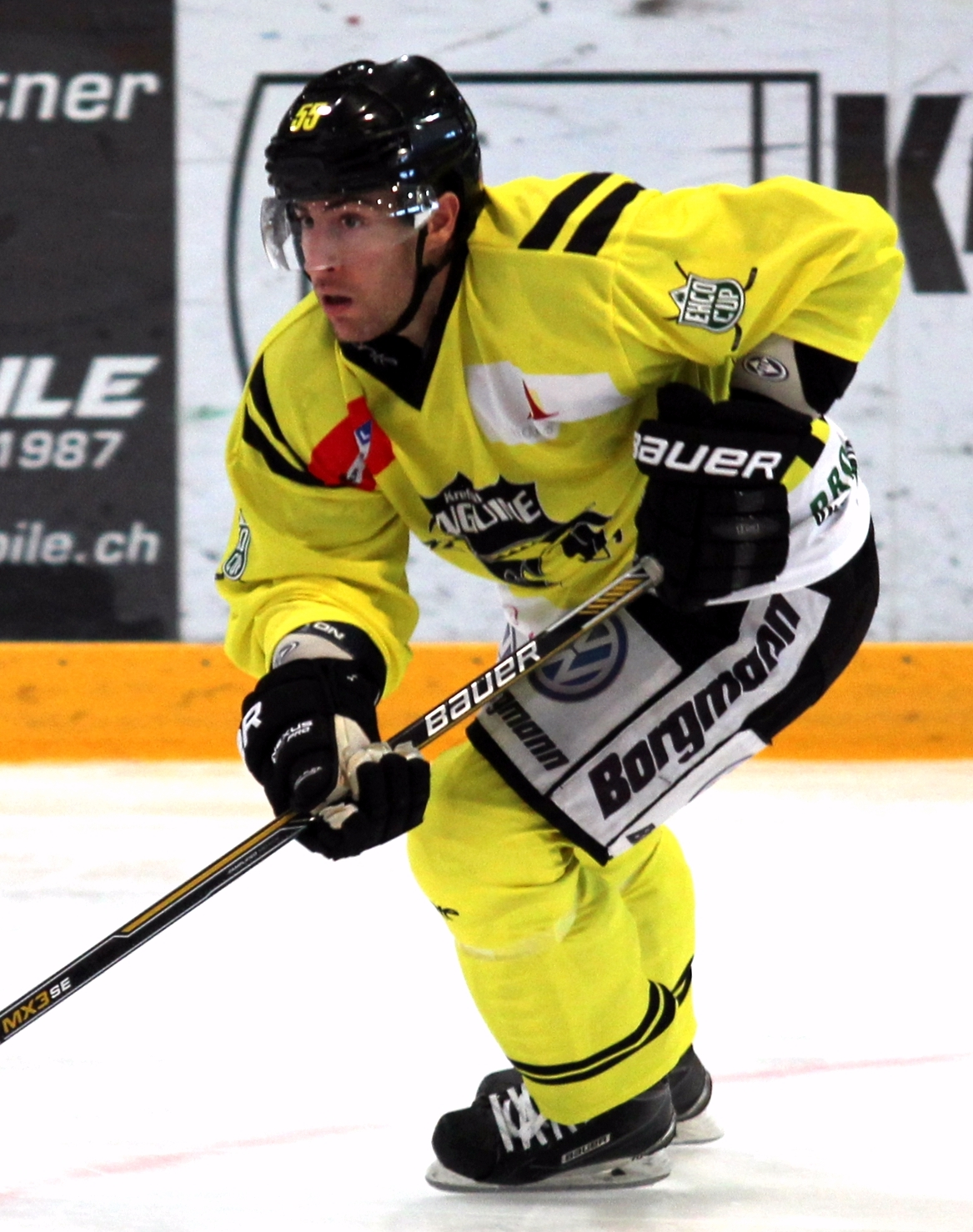
- Born: November 12, 1987 (age 38) Enfield, Connecticut, U.S.
- Height: 5 ft 9 in (175 cm)
- Weight: 185 lb (84 kg; 13 st 3 lb)
- Position: Defense
- Shoots: Right
- Metal Ligaen team Former teams: SønderjyskE; Norfolk Admirals; Charlotte Checkers; Springfield Falcons; Graz 99ers Krefeld Pinguine
- NHL draft: Undrafted
- Playing career: 2011–present

Michael Little (born November 12, 1987), better known as Mike Little, is an American professional ice hockey defenseman. He is currently playing for SønderjyskE of the Metal Ligaen in Denmark.

== Playing career ==
Following his four-year NCAA career at American International College, Little spent time in the ECHL (with the Reading Royals, Stockton Thunder and the Florida Everblades) and in the AHL with the Norfolk Admirals, the Charlotte Checkers and the Springfield Falcons.

The 2014-15 ECHL season saw him haul in 53 points in 60 games for the Florida Everblades. For his efforts, he was named to the All-ECHL First Team and received All-ECHL Defenseman of the Year honors.

On June 2, 2015, the Iserlohn Roosters of the Deutsche Eishockey Liga, Germany's elite ice hockey league, signed Little to a try-out contract for the 2015–16 season. Upon completion of the pre-season with the Roosters, and despite positive reviews, Little was not extended to a season long contract and was released from Iserlohn on September 7, 2015. Little was quickly signed in the neighbouring Austrian Hockey League to a one-year contract with the Graz 99ers on September 10. In mid-November 2015, he agreed on a short-term deal with the Kassel Huskies of the German second division DEL2 and had his contract extended until the end of the 2015-16 season later that month. He made a total of 47 appearances for the Kassel team, scoring 16 goals, while dishing out 35 assists, and helped the Huskies win the DEL2 championship.

Little then moved to Germany's top-tier Deutsche Eishockey Liga (DEL), signing with Krefeld Pinguine for the 2016–17 season on April 26, 2016. He appeared in 51 games, however, was unable to prevent the team from finishing last. Little left the club on March 3, 2017, after it was revealed he would not be offered a new contract.

== Awards and honors ==
Award	Year
ECHL First Team All-Star	2014–15
ECHL Defenseman of the Year	2014–15
