= Neil Conway =

Styles of Neil Conway
- Reference style: The Most Reverend
- Spoken style: Your Grace or Archbishop

Neil Conway (1670–1738) was an Irish prelate of the Roman Catholic Church.

Conway was born in Ballinascreen, County Londonderry and ordained a priest in 1697. He served as Bishop of Derry from his consecration in 1727 until his death on 6 January 1738. He received the degree of Doctor of Divinity (DD). He was buried at Moneyconey.
