= Riley Gill =

American ice hockey player (born 1985)

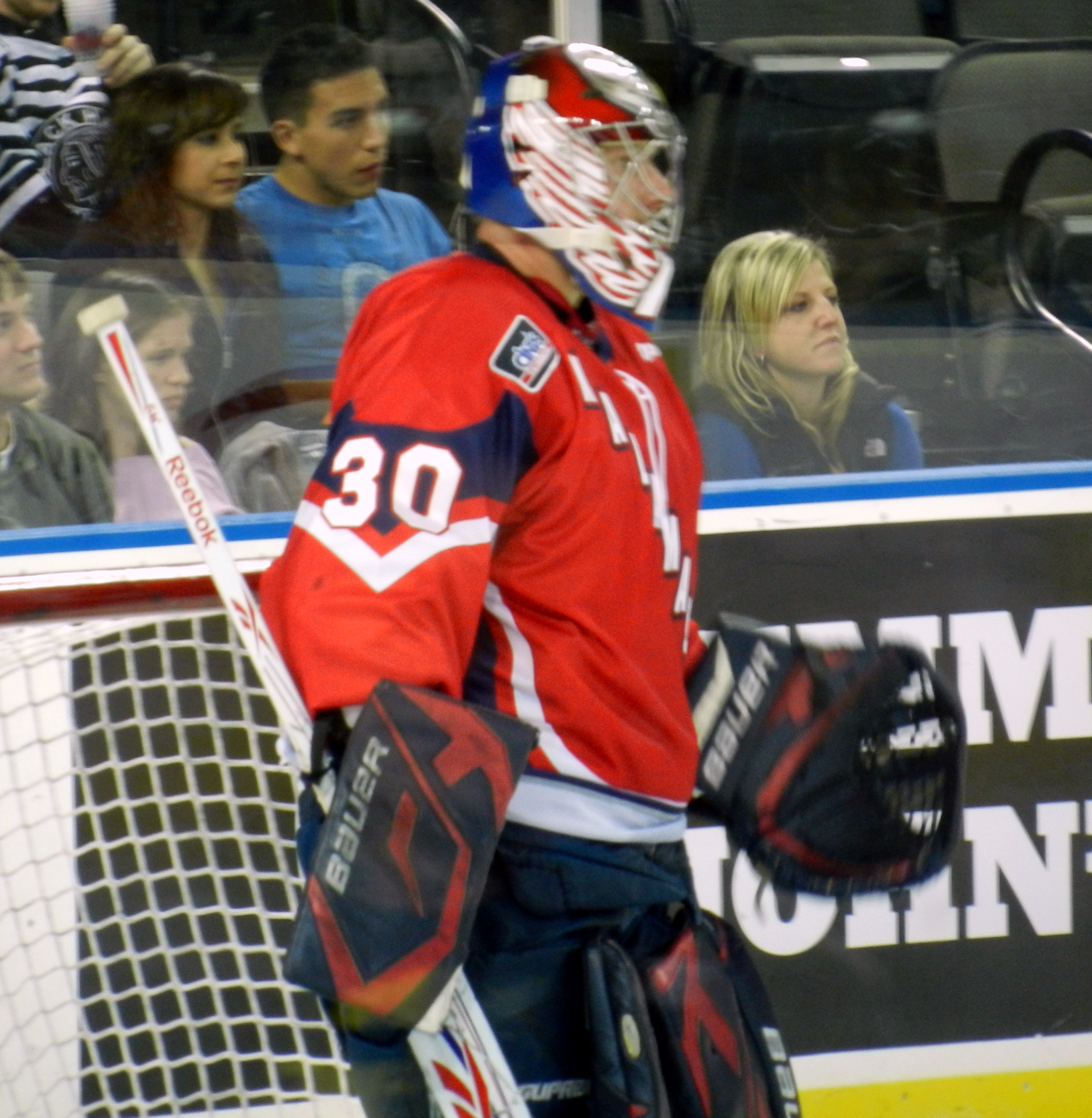
- Gill playing for the Kalamazoo Wings in 2011
- Born: January 1, 1985 (age 41) Northfield, Minnesota, U.S.
- Height: 6 ft 0 in (183 cm)
- Weight: 201 lb (91 kg; 14 st 5 lb)
- Position: Goaltender
- Caught: Left
- Played for: Worcester Sharks; Bridgeport Sound Tigers; Hershey Bears
- NHL draft: Undrafted
- Playing career: 2010–2017

Riley Gill (born January 1, 1985) is an American former professional ice hockey goaltender. He last played for the Allen Americans of the ECHL, where he won Goaltender of the Year in 2016–17 and backstopped the team to two Kelly Cup playoff championships in 2015 and 2016.

== Playing career ==
Gill attended the Western Michigan University from 2006 to 2010, where he played NCAA Division I college hockey with the Western Michigan Broncos men's ice hockey team. He completed his four years at Western Michigan University with an NCAA career 2.94 goals-against average and a .915 save percentage. and established team records for the most games played (111) and the best all-time save percentage in WMU history.

Gill began his professional career in the ECHL by joining the Kalamazoo Wings near the end of the 2009–10 ECHL season. During the 2012–13 ECHL season, he was selected as the ECHL's playoff MVP in helping the Reading Royals claim their first Kelly Cup.

At the end of the 2012–2013 season, Riley Gill was selected as the Sher-Wood Goaltender of the Year. "Gill led the league in wins (25-tied) and shootout wins (four) and set a new SPHL record with five shutouts. His 2.43 goals against average ranked second, while his .918 save percentage was tied for third-best. Gill’s strong play helped Louisiana to a 20-point improvement from last season, as the IceGators finished tied with Fayetteville for most points (73)."

On August 6, 2013, Gill was signed by the Royals' AHL affiliate, the Hershey Bears, to a one-year contract. Gill later joined the Allen Americans of the ECHL. While playing with the Americans, he won ECHL Goaltender of the Year after the 2016–17 season in which he tied for more shutouts in a season and set a new career high. Gill re-signed with the Americans in the offseason of that year, but only played in two games during the 2017–18 season.

== Awards and honors ==
Award	Year
College
All-CCHA Rookie Team	2006–07
SPHL
First All-Star Team	2012–13
Goaltender of the Year	2012–13
ECHL
Playoff MVP	2012–13
ECHL Goaltender of the Year	2016–17
