= Winston Day Chief =

Canadian professional ice hockey player

- Born: November 23, 1987 (age 38) Stand Off, Alberta, Canada
- Height: 6 ft 2 in (188 cm)
- Weight: 190 lb (86 kg; 13 st 8 lb)
- Position: Forward
- Shoots: Right
- team Former teams: Free Agent; Rapid City Rush; MAC Budapest; Cincinnati Cyclones; Wheeling Nailers
- NHL draft: Undrafted
- Playing career: 2012–present

Winston Day Chief (born November 23, 1987) is a Canadian former professional ice hockey player. He is currently an unrestricted free agent who most recently played with the Wheeling Nailers of the ECHL.

== Playing career ==
A member of the Blackfoot Kainai Nation, Day Chief was raised on the Blood Indian Reserve No. 148 in Alberta, Canada. He attended the University of Alaska Anchorage before enrolling with the University of Lethbridge where he played three seasons of CIS hockey with the Lethbridge Pronghorns, scoring 23 goals and 36 assists for 58 points, while earning 88 penalty minutes, in 68 games played. In his final year he was recognized for his outstanding play when he was named to the Canada West All-Stars Roster as competition for the Canada men's national junior ice hockey team.

On March 27, 2012, Winston Day Chief was signed as an amateur by the Rapid City Rush then of the Central Hockey League for their 2012 playoff run. He was re-signed by the Rush for the 2012–13 season, but in his third game he broke his shoulder when he slid hard into the boards. Returning to duty after missing two months of play, Day Chief played out the season, impressing Rapid City's head coach Joe Ferras who described his play as "fearless" saying "He plays hard. He finishes his checks. He's strong on the pucks and he's got great hands for a big man". On August 29, 2013, the Rapid City Rush announced that Day Chief had been retained to play the 2013–14 CHL season.

After 5 seasons within the Rush organization, Day Chief opted to turn to Europe, signing a one-year contract with MAC Budapest of the MOL Liga on August 8, 2016. At the conclusion of the 2016-17 campaign with Budapest, Day Chief opted to return to the ECHL, agreeing to a contract with the Cincinnati Cyclones on September 6, 2017.

Winston Day Chief signed a contract with the Wheeling Nailers on October 10, 2018.
