= 2014–15 ECHL season =

Ice hockey league season

- League: ECHL
- Sport: Ice hockey
- Duration: October 17, 2014 – April 11, 2015

Regular season
- Brabham Cup: Toledo Walleye
- Season MVP: Jeff Jakaitis (South Carolina)
- Top scorer: Chad Costello (Allen)

Playoffs
- Eastern champions: South Carolina Stingrays
- Eastern runners-up: Toledo Walleye
- Western champions: Allen Americans
- Western runners-up: Ontario Reign
- Playoffs MVP: Greger Hanson (Allen)

Kelly Cup
- Champions: Allen Americans
- Runners-up: South Carolina Stingrays

ECHL seasons
- ← 2013–14 2015–16 →

The 2014–15 ECHL season was the 27th season of the ECHL. The regular season schedule ran from October 17, 2014, to April 11, 2015, with the Kelly Cup playoffs following. Twenty-eight teams in 20 states and one Canadian province each played a 72-game schedule. Ten days prior to the start of the season, the league was significantly expanded on October 7, 2014, after the ECHL had accepted the Central Hockey League's remaining seven teams as members for the 2014–15 season.

== League business ==
=== Team changes ===
- The expansion Indy Fuel began play at the Fairgrounds Coliseum in Indianapolis, Indiana.
- The Las Vegas Wranglers voluntarily suspended operations in May 2014 to allow the team time to secure a new home arena. The team's lease with the Orleans Arena in Las Vegas was not renewed after the 2013–14 season. In January 2015, the team announced that they would not be returning and had withdrawn their membership from the ECHL at the Mid-season Board of Governors Meeting.
- Shortly before the season began on October 17, 2014, the ECHL expanded with seven new teams as a result of accepting the Central Hockey League's remaining seven teams as members. The Allen Americans, Brampton Beast, Missouri Mavericks, Quad City Mallards, Rapid City Rush, Tulsa Oilers and Wichita Thunder formed a new Central Division in the Western Conference. This entirely replaced a previously planned Midwest Division, which in turn reassigned the Colorado Eagles to the Western Conference's Pacific Division and sent Evansville, Fort Wayne, Kalamazoo and Indy to the Eastern Conference's North Division. Within the Eastern Conference the Elmira Jackals and Reading Royals were reassigned to the former South Division, which was renamed the East Division.

=== New affiliations and changes ===
ECHL team	New affiliates	Former affiliates
Alaska Aces	Minnesota Wild (NHL); St. Louis Blues (NHL); Iowa Wild (AHL)	Calgary Flames (NHL); Abbotsford Heat (AHL)
Allen Americans	San Jose Sharks (NHL); Worcester Sharks (AHL)	Unaffiliated in CHL
Brampton Beast	Unaffiliated from CHL	
Colorado Eagles	Calgary Flames (NHL); Adirondack Flames (AHL)	Independent
Elmira Jackals	Buffalo Sabres (NHL); Rochester Americans (AHL)	Ottawa Senators (NHL); Binghamton Senators (AHL)
Evansville IceMen	Ottawa Senators (NHL); Binghamton Senators (AHL)	Columbus Blue Jackets (NHL); Springfield Falcons (AHL)
Fort Wayne Komets	Colorado Avalanche (NHL); Lake Erie Monsters (AHL)	Independent
Indy Fuel	Chicago Blackhawks (NHL); Rockford IceHogs (AHL)	Expansion team
Kalamazoo Wings	Columbus Blue Jackets (NHL); Springfield Falcons (AHL)	St. Louis Blues (NHL)
Missouri Mavericks	Chicago Wolves (AHL) since 2011 in CHL	
Orlando Solar Bears		Minnesota Wild (NHL); Iowa Wild (AHL)
Quad City Mallards	Minnesota Wild (NHL); Iowa Wild (AHL)	Wild affiliation in CHL since 2013
Rapid City Rush	Unaffiliated from CHL	
Reading Royals	Philadelphia Flyers (NHL); Lehigh Valley Phantoms (AHL)	Washington Capitals (NHL); Hershey Bears (AHL)
South Carolina Stingrays	Washington Capitals (NHL); Hershey Bears (AHL)	
Toledo Walleye	Detroit Red Wings (NHL) Grand Rapids Griffins (AHL)	Chicago Blackhawks (NHL); Rockford IceHogs (AHL)
Tulsa Oilers	Unaffiliated from CHL	
Wichita Thunder	Unaffiliated from CHL	

=== Annual Board of Governors meeting ===
The annual ECHL Board of Governors meeting was held at the Monte Carlo Resort and Casino in Las Vegas, Nevada, in June 2014. Conferences were significantly re-aligned in light of recent team changes. In the Eastern Conference, the three-team Atlantic Division was eliminated while the Mountain Division in the Western Conference was eliminated to make way for a new Midwest Division. The Evansville IceMen, Fort Wayne Komets and Kalamazoo Wings were moved to the Western Conference to compete in the Midwest Division with the Colorado Eagles and expansion Indy Fuel. This was significantly revised after the CHL merger in October 2014, with the newly created Midwest Division eliminated in favor of a Central Division consisting of the former CHL teams. Along with Indy, Evansville, Fort Wayne and Kalamazoo were moved back to the Eastern Conference.

The ECHL Board of Governors also re-elected Gwinnett Gladiators president Steve Chapman as chairman and approved changes to the icing rule similar to those previously implemented by the National Hockey League.

=== All-star game ===
The annual ECHL All-Star Classic was held on January 21, 2015, at the Amway Center in Orlando, Florida. The format for the 2015 All-star Game featured the Orlando Solar Bears taking on the ECHL All-stars. The ECHL All-stars won the game with a score of 8-4 and the game had the largest ECHL all-star game attendance since 2000.

=== 2015 Kelly Cup Playoffs format ===
At the end of the regular season the top four teams in each division qualified for the 2015 Kelly Cup Playoffs. The first two playoff rounds were played entirely within the divisions, with the divisional playoff champions facing each other in the conference championships. The Kelly Cup final pitted the Eastern Conference champion against the Western Conference champion. All four rounds were a best-of-seven format.

== Standings ==
Due to accepting the Central Hockey League's remaining seven teams as members, the league's conference alignment changed on October 9, 2014, moving the Colorado Eagles to the Pacific Division and moving the seven former CHL squads into the Western Conference as the Central Division. The Midwest Division dissolved, with its remaining teams joining the North Division. To make room for the four Midwest teams, the Reading Royals and Elmira Jackals left the North Division for the South, which was then renamed the East Division. Final Regular Season Standings

Eastern Conference

North Division	GP	W	L	OTL	SOL	GF	GA	PTS
z – Toledo Walleye (DET)	72	50	15	5	2	281	182	107
x – Fort Wayne Komets (COL)	72	48	18	2	4	251	200	102
x – Kalamazoo Wings (CBJ/VAN)	72	36	30	3	3	226	233	78
x – Wheeling Nailers (MTL/PIT)	72	37	33	1	1	210	213	76
Cincinnati Cyclones (FLA/NSH)	72	31	30	2	9	195	212	73
Indy Fuel (CHI)	72	31	30	4	7	197	221	73
Evansville IceMen (OTT)	72	15	48	6	3	169	271	39

East Division	GP	W	L	OTL	SOL	GF	GA	PTS
y – Florida Everblades (CAR/TB)	72	49	16	2	5	267	208	105
x – South Carolina Stingrays (BOS/WSH)	72	45	20	1	6	224	163	97
x – Reading Royals (PHI)	72	45	21	4	2	259	210	96
x – Orlando Solar Bears (TOR)	72	37	25	6	4	236	215	84
Greenville Road Warriors (NYR)	72	39	29	1	3	216	215	82
Elmira Jackals (BUF)	72	32	33	0	7	186	217	71
Gwinnett Gladiators (ARZ)	72	20	45	3	4	174	263	47

Western Conference

Central Division	GP	W	L	OTL	SOL	GF	GA	PTS
y – Allen Americans (SJ)	72	48	14	6	4	292	203	106
x – Rapid City Rush (Ind.)	72	37	28	2	5	218	206	81
x – Quad City Mallards (MIN)	72	37	28	4	3	205	186	81
x – Tulsa Oilers (Ind.)	72	37	29	3	3	248	244	80
Wichita Thunder (Ind.)	72	32	31	2	7	213	240	73
Missouri Mavericks (AHL-CHI)	72	28	35	5	4	192	231	65
Brampton Beast (Ind.)	72	23	46	3	0	181	298	49

Pacific Division	GP	W	L	OTL	SOL	GF	GA	PTS
y – Idaho Steelheads (DAL)	72	48	18	2	4	258	187	102
x – Ontario Reign (LA/WPG)	72	43	19	4	6	239	184	96
x – Colorado Eagles (CGY)	72	41	23	4	4	236	209	90
x – Utah Grizzlies (ANA)	72	37	27	5	3	213	219	82
Alaska Aces (MIN/STL)	72	35	30	3	4	237	233	77
Bakersfield Condors (EDM)	72	26	38	3	5	202	265	60
Stockton Thunder (NYI)	72	21	49	1	1	199	296	44

x - clinched playoff spot, y - clinched regular season division title, z - Brabham Cup (regular season) champion

== Postseason ==
Division semifinals	Division finals
N1	Toledo Walleye	4
N4	Wheeling Nailers	3
N1	Toledo	4
North Division
N2	Fort Wayne	3
N2	Fort Wayne Komets	4
N3	Kalamazoo Wings	1
Eastern Conference
E1	Florida Everblades	4
E4	Orlando Solar Bears	2
E1	Florida	2
East Division
E2	South Carolina	4
E2	South Carolina Stingrays	4
E3	Reading Royals	3
C1	Allen Americans	4
C4	Tulsa Oilers	1
C1	Allen	4
Central Division
C2	Rapid City	2
C2	Rapid City Rush	4
C3	Quad City Mallards	3
Western Conference
P1	Idaho Steelheads	2
P4	Utah Grizzlies	4
P4	Utah	1
Pacific Division
P2	Ontario	4
P2	Ontario Reign	4
P3	Colorado Eagles	3

Conference finals
N1	Toledo	3
E2	South Carolina	4
C1	Allen	4
P2	Ontario	3

Kelly Cup finals
E2	South Carolina	3
C1	Allen	4

== Awards ==
Award	Winner
Patrick Kelly Cup:	Allen Americans
Henry Brabham Cup:	Toledo Walleye
Gingher Memorial Trophy:	South Carolina Stingrays
Bruce Taylor Trophy:	Allen Americans
John Brophy Award:	Derek Lalonde, Toledo Walleye
CCM Most Valuable Player:	Jeff Jakaitis, South Carolina Stingrays
Kelly Cup Playoffs Most Valuable Player:	Greger Hanson, Allen Americans
Warrior Hockey Goaltender of the Year:	Jeff Jakaitis, South Carolina Stingrays
CCM Rookie of the Year:	Tyler Barnes, Toledo Walleye
CCM Defenseman of the Year:	Mike Little, Florida Everblades
Leading Scorer:	Chad Costello, Allen Americans
AMI Graphics Plus Performer Award:	Drew Daniels, Fort Wayne Komets; Mike Little, Florida Everblades
Sportsmanship Award:	Chad Costello, Allen Americans
Community Service Award:	Cal Wild, Brampton Beast
Birmingham Memorial Award:	Scott Senger

=== All-ECHL Teams ===
All-First Team

- Jeff Jakaitis (G) – South Carolina Stingrays
- Mike Little (D) – Florida Everblades
- Matthew Register (D) – Ontario Reign
- Chad Costello (F) – Allen Americans
- Wade MacLeod (F) – Idaho Steelheads
- Shawn Szydlowski (F) – Fort Wayne Komets

All-Second Team

- Jeff Lerg (G) – Toledo Walleye
- Cameron Burt (D) – Florida Everblades
- Aaron Gens (D) – Allen Americans
- Adam Brace (F) – Florida Everblades
- Brendan Connolly (F) – Alaska Aces
- Gary Steffes (F) – Allen Americans

All-Rookie Team

- Roman Will (G) – Fort Wayne Komets
- Justin Baker (D) – Allen Americans
- Steven Shamanski (D) – Elmira Jackals
- Derek Army (F) – Wheeling Nailers
- Tyler Barnes (F) – Toledo Walleye
- Jason Bast (F) – Idaho Steelheads

== See also ==
- List of ECHL seasons
- 2014 in sports
- 2015 in sports
