= 2012 Kelly Cup playoffs =

- Logo for 2012 Kelly Cup playoffs

Tournament details
- Dates: April 2–May 23, 2012
- Teams: 15

Final positions
- Champions: Florida Everblades
- Runners-up: Las Vegas Wranglers

Tournament statistics
- Scoring leader(s): Eric Lampe (Las Vegas); Cedric McNicoll (Florida) (21 points)

The 2012 Kelly Cup Playoffs of the ECHL started on April 2, 2012 following the end of the 2011–12 ECHL regular season. The playoff format remains unchanged from that of the 2011 postseason. 15 teams qualified for the playoffs, being the top seven teams from the Western Conference and the top eight teams from the Eastern Conference.

== Playoff format ==
In the Eastern Conference, postseason berths will be awarded to the first-place team in each division and the next five teams in the conference, based on points. The division winners will be seeded first, second and third and will play the eighth-place finisher, the seventh-place finisher and the sixth-place finisher, respectively, while the fourth-place finisher and the fifth-place finisher will meet. The conference semifinals will have the winner of the first-place and eighth-place matchup will meet the winner of the fourth-place and fifth-place game while the winner of the second-place and seventh-place game will face the winner of the third-place and sixth-place matchup.

In the Western Conference, postseason berths will be awarded to the first-place team in each division and the next five teams in the conference, based on points. The division winner with the best record in the conference will receive a bye in the first round. The other division winner will be seeded second and meet the team that finishes seventh in the conference in the first round. The other first round matchups will be the third-place finisher in the conference against the sixth-place finisher in the conference and the fourth-place finisher in the conference against the fifth-place finisher in the conference. The conference semifinals will have the first-place finisher meeting the winner of the fourth-place and fifth-place matchup and the winner of the second-place finisher and seventh-place finisher against the winner of the third-place finisher against the sixth-place finisher.

The first round in each Conference will be a best of five series with each subsequent round being a best of seven series.

== Playoff seeds ==
After the regular season, 15 teams qualified for the playoffs. The Alaska Aces were the Western Conference regular season champions and the Brabham Cup winners with the best record at 97 points, making them the first team in league history to win the Brabham Cup in consecutive seasons. The Elmira Jackals earned the top seed in the Eastern Conference and finished the season with 95 points.

=== Eastern Conference ===
1. Elmira Jackals - Atlantic Division and Eastern Conference champions, 95 points.
2. Gwinnett Gladiators - South Division champions, 93 points.
3. Kalamazoo Wings - North Division champions, 84 points.
4. Greenville Road Warriors - 88 points.
5. Florida Everblades - 85 points.
6. Wheeling Nailers - 83 points.
7. South Carolina Stingrays - 81 points.
8. Reading Royals - 80 points.

=== Western Conference ===
1. Alaska Aces - Western Conference and Mountain Division champions, Brabham Cup winner, 97 points.
2. Ontario Reign - Pacific Division champions, 94 points.
3. Las Vegas Wranglers - 92 points.
4. Colorado Eagles - 82 points.
5. Stockton Thunder - 73 points.
6. Utah Grizzlies - 72 points.
7. Idaho Steelheads - 71 points.

== Playoff bracket ==
Conference quarterfinals	Conference semifinals
1	Elmira	3
8	Reading	2
1	Elmira	1
5	Florida	4
4	Greenville	0
5	Florida	3
Eastern Conference
2	Gwinnett	1
7	South Carolina	3
7	South Carolina	1
3	Kalamazoo	4
3	Kalamazoo	3
6	Wheeling	1
1	Alaska	–
8	BYE	–
1	Alaska	4
5	Stockton	1
4	Colorado	0
5	Stockton	3
Western Conference
2	Ontario	2
7	Idaho	3
7	Idaho	1
3	Las Vegas	4
3	Las Vegas	3
6	Utah	0

Conference finals
5	Florida	4
3	Kalamazoo	1
1	Alaska	1
3	Las Vegas	4

Kelly Cup finals
E5	Florida	4
W3	Las Vegas	1

== Conference Quarterfinals ==
Home team is listed first.

=== Eastern Conference ===
==== (1) Elmira Jackals vs. (8) Reading Royals ====
April 3	Reading Royals	4–1	Elmira Jackals	Sovereign Center	Recap
Yannick Riendeau (1) 16:48		First period	Jimmy Martin (1) 17:04
Kenny Ryan (1) 2:10; Kenny Ryan (2) 7:39; Yannick Tifu (1) 18:46 EN		Second period	No scoring
No scoring		Third period	No scoring
Mark Owuya 36 shots / 35 saves		Goalie stats	Brian Stewart 26 shots / 23 saves

April 4	Reading Royals	4–1	Elmira Jackals	Sovereign Center	Recap
Dale Mitchell (1) 2:58 PP; Mikael Bedard (1) 12:33 PP		First period	No scoring
Ian O'Connor (1) 18:58		Second period	No scoring
Kenny Ryan (3) 19:27 EN		Third period	Dustin Gazley (1) 9:48; Arlem Demkov (1) 19:05
Mark Owuya 40 shots / 38 saves		Goalie stats	Timo Pielmeier 24 shots / 21 saves

April 6	Elmira Jackals	5–2	Reading Royals	First Arena	Recap
Mike Radja (1) 16:54		First period	Ian O'Connor (2) 9:10; Olivier Labelle (1) 19:56
Craig Rivet (1) 3:36		Second period	No scoring
Nick Dineen (1) 16:17; Mike Radja (2) 17:17; Rob Bellamy (1) 19:00 EN		Third period	No scoring
Brian Stewart 20 shots / 18 saves		Goalie stats	Mark Owuya 32 shots / 28 saves

April 7	Elmira Jackals	3–0	Reading Royals	First Arena	Recap
No scoring		First period	No scoring
No scoring		Second period	No scoring
Matt Campanale (1) 7:34; Rob Bellamy (2) 19:19 EN; Mario Larocque (1) 19:47 EN		Third period	No scoring
Brian Stewart 28 shots / 28 saves		Goalie stats	Mark Owuya 26 shots / 25 saves

April 9	Elmira Jackals	4–2	Reading Royals	First Arena	Recap
Jean Bourbeau (1) 11:45		First period	No scoring
No scoring		Second period	No scoring
Artem Demkov (2) 7:20; Corey Cowick (1) 16:39; Corey Cowick (2) 19:08 EN		Third period	Denny Urban (1) 1:54; Yannick Tifu (2) 13:20
Brian Stewart 29 shots / 27 saves		Goalie stats	Mark Owuya 32 shots / 29 saves

Elmira wins series 3–2.

==== (2) Gwinnett Gladiators vs. (7) South Carolina Stingrays ====
April 3	South Carolina Stingrays	3–0	Gwinnett Gladiators	North Charleston Coliseum	Recap
Johann Kroll (1) 10:40 PP		First period	No scoring
Greg Stewart (1) 12:16		Second period	No scoring
Greg Stewart (2) 1:26		Third period	No scoring
Daren Machesney 20 shots / 20 saves		Goalie stats	Marc Cheverie 26 shots / 23 saves

April 4	South Carolina Stingrays	2–3	Gwinnett Gladiators	North Charleston Coliseum	Recap
Maxime Lacroix (1) 4:15		First period	No scoring
No scoring		Second period	Justin Milo (1) 5:37 PP
Greg Stewart (3) 2:24		Third period	Joey Haddad (1) 11:18 PP; Joey Haddad (2) 18:09
Daren Machesney 26 shots / 23 saves		Goalie stats	Marc Cheverie 23 shots / 21 saves

April 6	Gwinnett Gladiators	3–4	4OT	South Carolina Stingrays	Arena at Gwinnett Center	Recap
Dallas Jackson (1) 6:39		First period		Johann Kroll (2) 9:18 PP
Andy Brandt (1) 8:12; Jacob Drewiske (1) 15:18		Second period		Matt Scherer (1) 10:51
No scoring		Third period		Dustin Stevenson (1) 2:15
No scoring		Fourth overtime period		Zach Tarkir (1) 4:19
Marc Cheverie 48 shots / 44 saves		Goalie stats		Rob Madore 57 shots / 54 saves

April 8	Gwinnett Gladiators	3–4	2OT	South Carolina Stingrays	Arena at Gwinnett Center	Recap
No scoring		First period		No scoring
Nikita Kashirsky (1) 13:36 PP; Nikita Kashirsky (2) 16:54 PP		Second period		Brett Flemming (1) 4:35 PP; Maxime Lacroix (2) 14:05
Will Colbert (1) 18:20		Third period		Maxime Lacroix (3) 1:30
No scoring		Second overtime period		Maxime Lacroix (4) 16:52
Marc Cheverie 51 shots / 47 saves		Goalie stats		Rob Madore 42 shots / 39 saves

South Carolina wins series 3–1.

==== (3) Kalamazoo Wings vs. (6) Wheeling Nailers ====
April 3	Wheeling Nailers	4–2	Kalamazoo Wings	WesBanco Arena	Recap
No scoring		First period	No scoring
Paul Crowder (1) 18:30 PP		Second period	Darryl Bootland (1) 1:39 PP
Chris Barton (1) 8:10; Ben Farrer (1) 18:53; Andrew Hotham (1) 19:53 EN/SH		Third period	Nick Sirota (1) 1:16
Patrick Killeen 27 shots / 25 saves		Goalie stats	Riley Gill 38 shots / 35 saves

April 4	Wheeling Nailers	2–4	Kalamazoo Wings	WesBanco Arena	Recap
No scoring		First period	Kory Karlander (1) 13:33
Philip Samuelsson (1) 1:05; Andrew Hotham (2) 15:14		Second period	No scoring
No scoring		Third period	Mike Matczak (1) 3:27 PP; Dwight Helminen (1) 8:59; Sam Ftorek (1) 14:02 PP
Patrick Killeen 25 shots / 21 saves		Goalie stats	Riley Gill 31 shots / 29 saves

April 6	Kalamazoo Wings	5–1	Wheeling Nailers	Wings Stadium	Recap
Elgin Reid (1) 14:35		First period	No scoring
Dustin Cloutier (1) 1:12; Nick Sirota (2) 15:07 PP		Second period	Chris Barton (2) 3:40
Darryl Bootland (2) 4:32; Dustin Cloutier 6:26		Third period	No scoring
Riley Gill 38 shots / 37 saves		Goalie stats	Patrick Killeen 25 shots / 20 saves

April 7	Kalamazoo Wings	3–2	Wheeling Nailers	Wings Stadium	Recap
Justin Taylor (1) 5:46; Kory Karlander (2) 13:01		First period	Chris Barton (3) 18:29
Dwight Helminen (2) 11:51		Second period	No scoring
No scoring		Third period	Chris Barton (4) 2:57
Riley Gill 28 shots / 26 saves		Goalie stats	Patrick Killeen 26 shots / 23 saves

Kalamazoo wins series 3–1.

==== (4) Greenville Road Warriors vs. (5) Florida Everblades ====
April 2	Florida Everblades	5–2	Greenville Road Warriors	Germain Arena	Recap
David Fischer (1) 8:02 PP		First period	No scoring
Trevor Bruess (1) 0:58; David Rutherford (1) 11:21; Matt Beca (1) 13:41 PP		Second period	Chris McKelvie (1) 3:56
Cedric Lalonde-McNicoll (1) 5:28		Third period	Sean Berkstresser (1) 1:39 PP
John Muse 32 shots / 30 saves		Goalie stats	Nic Riopel 46 shots / 41 saves

April 4	Florida Everblades	4–2	Greenville Road Warriors	Germain Arena	Recap
Mathieu Roy (ice hockey) (1) 6:10 PP; Cedric Lalonde-McNicoll (2) 8:19		First period	Marc-Olivier Vallerand (1) 13:57 PP
Leigh Salters (1) 7:42 PP; David Rutherford (2) 13:06		Second period	Marc-Olivier Vallerand (2) 15:43
No scoring		Third period	No scoring
John Muse 34 shots / 32 saves		Goalie stats	Jason Missiaen 33 shots / 29 saves

April 6	Greenville Road Warriors	2–3	Florida Everblades	BI-LO Center	Recap
No scoring		First period	Sebastien Piche (1) 1:06; Matt Beca (2) 3:32
Jeff Prough (1) 0:43		Second period	Matt Beca (3) 0:33
Brendan Connolly (1) 6:33		Third period	No scoring
Nic Riopel 34 shots / 31 saves		Goalie stats	John Muse 34 shots / 32 saves

Florida wins series 3–0.

=== Western Conference ===
==== (2) Ontario Reign vs. (7) Idaho Steelheads ====
April 3	Idaho Steelheads	3–2	Ontario Reign	CenturyLink Arena Boise	Recap
Ron Meyers (1) 1:42		First period	No scoring
No scoring		Second period	Kyle Kraemer (1) 16:47
Aaron Lewicki (1) 14:38 PP; Marty Flichel (1) 18:26		Third period	C.J. Stretch (1) 3:04
Jerry Kuhn 26 shots / 24 saves		Goalie stats	Jean-Francois Berube 29 shots / 26 saves

April 4	Idaho Steelheads	3–4	OT	Ontario Reign	CenturyLink Arena Boise	Recap
Chad Nehring (1) 10:50		First period		No scoring
Marty Flichel (2) 4:14 PP		Second period		Everett Sheen (1) 1:54
Michael Neal (1) 12:57		Third period		Alan Mazur (1) 11:45; J.D. Watt (1) 17:37
No scoring		First overtime period		Geoff Irwin (1) 9:02
Jerry Kuhn 16 shots / 15 saves Brian Hince 24 shots / 21 saves		Goalie stats		Jean-Francois Berube 29 shots / 26 saves

April 6	Ontario Reign	3–5	Idaho Steelheads	Citizens Business Bank Arena	Recap
No scoring		First period	Michael Gergen (1) 7:16
Kevin Estrada (1) 14:42 PP; Geoff Irwin (2) 15:15 PP		Second period	Jacob Cepis (1) 8:35
Derek Couture (1) 11:50		Third period	Aaron Lewicki (2) 3:00 PP; Jacob Cepis (2) 5:16 PP; Cody Purves (1) 18:56 EN
Jean-Francois Berube 25 shots / 21 saves		Goalie stats	Jerry Kuhn 42 shots / 39 saves

April 7	Ontario Reign	3–2	Idaho Steelheads	Citizens Business Bank Arena	Recap
Bill Bagron (1) 14:10		First period	No scoring
Geoff Irwin (3) 1:00; Kevin Estrada (2) 10:31 PP		Second period	Chad Nehring (2) 9:19; Aaron Lewicki (3) 16:31
No scoring		Third period	No scoring
Chris Carrozzi 28 shots / 26 saves		Goalie stats	Jerry Kuhn 26 shots / 23 saves

April 9	Ontario Reign	0–5	Idaho Steelheads	Citizens Business Bank Arena	Recap
No scoring		First period	Jacob Cepis (3) 7:50
No scoring		Second period	Joe Pereira (1) 8:10 PP; Jacob Cepis (4) 14:18; Michael Neal (2) 18:00
No scoring		Third period	Cody Purves (2) 0:37 PP
Chris Carrozzi 23 shots / 19 saves Jean-Francois Berube 7 shots / 6 saves		Goalie stats	Jerry Kuhn 46 shots / 46 saves

Idaho wins series 3–2.

==== (3) Las Vegas Wranglers vs. (6) Utah Grizzlies ====
April 2	Utah Grizzlies	0–2	Las Vegas Wranglers	Maverik Center	Recap
No scoring		First period	No scoring
No scoring		Second period	Eric Lampe (1) 1:14
No scoring		Third period	Eric Lampe (2) 3:32
Andrew Engelage 28 shots / 26 saves		Goalie stats	Mitch O'Keefe 21 shots / 21 saves

April 3	Utah Grizzlies	2–3	Las Vegas Wranglers	Maverik Center	Recap
Kory Falite (1) 9:04 PP		First period	Judd Blackwater (1) 3:41; Chris Francis (1) 19:18 PP
No scoring		Second period	Michael Busto (1) 3:44
Josh Burrows (1) 12:48)		Third period	No scoring
Andrew Engelage 32 shots / 29 saves		Goalie stats	Mitch O'Keefe 48 shots / 46 saves

April 5	Las Vegas Wranglers	4–2	Utah Grizzlies	Orleans Arena	Recap
Adam Miller (1) 11:24		First period	Derick Martin (1) 16:19
Scott Campbell (1) 7:52 PP; Ash Goldie (1) 12:54		Second period	Kory Falite (2) 6:04
Geoff Paukovich (1) 12:01		Third period	No scoring
Mitch O'Keefe 26 shots / 24 saves		Goalie stats	Andrew Engelage 29 shots / 25 saves

Las Vegas wins series 3–0

==== (4) Colorado Eagles vs. (5) Stockton Thunder ====
April 3	Stockton Thunder	3–1	Colorado Eagles	Stockton Arena	Recap
Garet Hunt (1) 3:10		First period	No scoring
Jesse Fratkin (1) 10:42 SH		Second period	No scoring
Chris D'Alvise (1) 4:29 PP		Third period	Aaron Slattengren (1) 6:08
Olivier Roy 36 shots / 35 saves		Goalie stats	Kyle Jones 45 shots / 42 saves

April 4	Stockton Thunder	3–2	OT	Colorado Eagles	Stockton Arena	Recap
No scoring		First period		Joey Sides (1) 0:48; Tegan Moore (1) 1:50
Max Campbell (1) 8:06		Second period		No scoring
Max Campbell (2) 16:36		Third period		No scoring
Chris D'Alvise (2) 0:17		First overtime period		No scoring
Olivier Roy 22 shots / 20 saves		Goalie stats		Kyle Jones 35 shots / 32 saves

April 6	Colorado Eagles	2–4	Stockton Thunder	Budweiser Events Center	Recap
Steve Haddon (1) 15:39 PP		First period	Matt Foy (1) 13:59
No scoring		Second period	Max Campbell (3) 2:06 PP; Max Campbell (4) 15:24
Riley Nelson (1) 3:31 PP		Third period	Jordan Fulton (1) 19:34 EN/SH
Kyle Jones 17 shots / 14 saves		Goalie stats	Olivier Roy 30 shots / 28 saves

Stockton wins series 3–0.

== Conference Semifinals ==
Home team is listed first.

=== Eastern Conference ===
==== (1) Elmira Jackals vs. (5) Florida Everblades ====
This was the second playoff meeting between the two franchises; Elmira defeated Florida 4-2 in the 2010 Eastern Conference Semifinals. During the regular season, Elmira defeated Florida 4-2, going 2-1 both in Elmira and in Florida. Florida's John Muse was injured in the second period of Game 2, resulting in Pat Nagle coming in for the third period to secure the shutout. Nagle would be Florida's goalie throughout the rest of the series.

April 13	Elmira Jackals	3-1	Florida Everblades	First Arena	Recap
Mike Radja (3) 5:19 PP; Jean Bourbeau (2) 6:54		First period	Brandon MacLean (1) 14:45
Artem Demkov (3) 5:38		Second period	No scoring
No scoring		Third period	No scoring
Brian Stewart 46 shots / 45 saves		Goalie stats	John Muse 19 shots / 16 saves

April 14	Elmira Jackals	0-4	Florida Everblades	First Arena	Recap
No scoring		First period	Brayden Irwin (1) 2:16 PP; Matt Marquardt (1) 9:12
No scoring		Second period	Trevor Bruess (2) 3:18; Trevor Bruess (3) 5:54; Leigh Salters (2) 19:54
No scoring		Third period	No scoring
Brian Stewart 15 shots / 11 saves Timo Pielmeier 17 shots / 16 saves		Goalie stats	John Muse 11 shots / 11 saves Pat Nagle 8 shots / 8 saves

April 16	Florida Everblades	5-4	OT	Elmira Jackals	Germain Arena	Recap
Matt Marquardt (2) 4:39		First period		No scoring
Kevin Quick (1) 13:57 PP; Leigh Salters (3) 14:36 PP; Matt Beca (4) 16:00		Second period		Artem Demkov (4) 1:41; Jordan Pietrus (1) 3:01; Rob Bellamy (3) 5:04; Jean Bourbeau (3) 10:52
No scoring		Third period		No scoring
David Fischer (2) 19:57		First overtime period		No scoring
Pat Nagle 32 shots / 28 saves		Goalie stats		Timo Pielmeier 55 shots / 50 saves

April 18	Florida Everblades	2-0	Elmira Jackals	Germain Arena	Recap
No scoring		First period	No scoring
Scott Pitt (1) 2:32		Second period	No scoring
Bobby Raymond (1) 1:14		Third period	No scoring
Pat Nagle 24 shots / 24 saves		Goalie stats	Brian Stewart 26 shots / 24 saves

April 20	Florida Everblades	2-1	Elmira Jackals	Germain Arena	Recap
No scoring		First period	No scoring
No scoring		Second period	Craig Rivet (2) 6:52
Cedric Lalonde-McNicoll (3) 9:54; Mathieu Roy (2) 18:01		Third period	No scoring
Pat Nagle 19 shots / 18 saves		Goalie stats	Brian Stewart 43 shots / 41 saves

Florida wins series 4-1

==== (3) Kalamazoo Wings vs. (7) South Carolina Stingrays ====
April 13	Kalamazoo Wings	6-4	South Carolina Stingrays	Wings Stadium	Recap
Nick Sirota (3) 3:49; Nick Sirota (4) 11:54; Trent Daavettila (1) 18:45		First period	Maxime Lacroix (5) 10:32; Andrew Cherniwchan (1) 17:26
Dustin Cloutier (3) 17:57		Second period	No scoring
Elgin Reid (2) 11:26; Elgin Reid (3) 11:40		Third period	Billy Ryan (1) 11:50; Michael Dorr (1) 17:52
Riley Gill 35 shots / 31 saves		Goalie stats	Rob Madore 28 shots / 22 saves Billy Sauer 2 shots / 2 saves

April 14	Kalamazoo Wings	4-1	South Carolina Stingrays	Wings Stadium	Recap
Darryl Bootland (3) 13:22 PP		First period	Chris Higgins (1) 3:34
No scoring		Second period	No scoring
Dwight Helminen (3) 13:35; Eric Kattelus (1) 17:01; Nick Sirota (5) 19:20 EN		Third period	No scoring
Riley Gill 20 shots / 19 saves		Goalie stats	Rob Madore 31 shots / 28 saves

April 18	South Carolina Stingrays	0-3	Kalamazoo Wings	North Charleston Coliseum	Recap
No scoring		First period	Nick Sirota (6) 2:44; Justin Taylor (2) 3:35; Trent Daavettila (2) 14:53
No scoring		Second period	No scoring
No scoring		Third period	No scoring
Rob Madore 23 shots / 20 saves		Goalie stats	Riley Gill 30 shots / 30 saves

April 20	South Carolina Stingrays	4-1	Kalamazoo Wings	North Charleston Coliseum	Recap
Micheal Dorr (2) 2:52; Andrew Cherniwchan (2) 9:24		First period	No scoring
No scoring		Second period	No scoring
Chris Higgins (2) 7:47; Billy Ryan (2) 19:35 EN		Third period	Nick Sirota (7) 13:49 PP
Daren Machesney 33 shots / 32 saves		Goalie stats	Riley Gill 20 shots / 17 saves

April 21	South Carolina Stingrays	1-5	Kalamazoo Wings	North Charleston Coliseum	Recap
Brett Flemming (2) 10:13 PP		First period	Trent Daavettila (3) 19:18 PP
No scoring		Second period	Sam Ftorek (2) 1:07 PP; Sam Ftorek (3) 18:05 PP
No scoring		Third period	Justin Taylor (3) 6:52 PP; Darryl Bootland (4) 15:57
Daren Macheaney 32 shots / 27 saves		Goalie stats	Riley Gill 32 shots / 31 saves

Kalamazoo wins series 4-1

=== Western Conference ===
==== (1) Alaska Aces vs. (5) Stockton Thunder ====
April 13	Alaska Aces	2-1	Stockton Thunder	Sullivan Arena	Recap
No scoring		First period	No scoring
No scoring		Second period	No scoring
Dan Kissel (1) 12:10; Garry Nunn (1) 16:52		Third period	Greg Squires (1) 8:57
Gerald Coleman 26 shots / 25 saves		Goalie stats	Olivier Roy 25 shots / 23 saves

April 14	Alaska Aces	2-3	OT	Stockton Thunder	Sullivan Arena	Recap
No scoring		First period		No scoring
Brandon Gentile (1) 9:14; Nick Mazzolini (1) 10:05		Second period		Max Campbell (5) 13:07; Kevin Baker (1) 15:20
No scoring		Third period		No scoring
No scoring		First overtime period		Chris D'Alvise (3) 9:19 PP
Gerald Coleman 29 shots / 26 saves		Goalie stats		Olivier Roy 40 shots / 38 saves

April 18	Stockton Thunder	0-4	Alaska Aces	Stockton Arena	Recap
No scoring		First period	Ryan Cruthers (1) 11:37 PP
No scoring		Second period	No scoring
No scoring		Third period	Wes Goldie (1) 1:06; Nick Mazzolini (2) 1:25; Jordan Kremyr (1) 14:42
Olivier Roy 40 shots / 36 saves		Goalie stats	Gerald Coleman 22 shots / 22 saves

April 20	Stockton Thunder	2-4	Alaska Aces	Stockton Arena	Recap
Greg Squires (2) 7:32		First period	No scoring
Gabriel Levesque (1) 7:13 PP		Second period	Tyson Marsh (1) 1:18; Ryan Cruthers (2) 18:16
No scoring		Third period	Steve Ward (1) 14:08 PP; Nick Mazzolini (3) 19:57 EN
Olivier Roy 29 shots / 26 saves		Goalie stats	Gerald Coleman 21 shots / 19 saves

April 21	Stockton Thunder	1-4	Alaska Aces	Stockton Arena	Recap
No scoring		First period	Dan Kissel (2) 11:13; Steve Ward (2) 13:04 PP
Jesse Fratkin (2) 3:14		Second period	Garry Nunn (2) 7:30; Dan Kissel (3) 18:32
No scoring		Third period	No scoring
Olivier Roy 26 shots / 22 saves		Goalie stats	Gerald Coleman 31 shots / 30 saves

Alaska wins series 4-1

==== (3) Las Vegas Wranglers vs. (7) Idaho Steelheads ====
This was the fifth postseason meeting between the two franchises. Idaho had won three of the prior series (semifinals in 2004 and 2007, and quarterfinals in 2011); Las Vegas' sole historical victory was in the 2006 semifinals. During the regular season, Las Vegas was 7-1-4 against Idaho (1 overtime loss and 3 shootout losses, with 1 win in shootout).

April 16	Las Vegas Wranglers	3-1	Idaho Steelheads	Orleans Arena	Recap
No scoring		First period	Michael Neal (3) 5:38
Scott Campbell (2) 11:09 SH; Mike Madill (1) 12:41		Second period	No scoring
Scott Campbell (3) 19:22 EN		Third period	No scoring
Mitch O'Keefe 18 shots / 17 saves		Goalie stats	Jerry Kuhn 45 shots / 43 saves

April 17	Las Vegas Wranglers	3-2	OT	Idaho Steelheads	Orleans Arena	Recap
No scoring		First period		No scoring
Josh Lunden (1) 4:09; Peter MacArthur (1) 14:18		Second period		Cody Purves (3) 11:53
No scoring		Third period		Joe Pereira (2) 18:08
Scott Campbell (4) 1:31		First overtime period		No scoring
Mitch O'Keefe 30 shots / 28 saves		Goalie stats		Jerry Kuhn 45 shots / 42 saves

April 19	Idaho Steelheads	4-3	Las Vegas Wranglers	CenturyLink Arena Boise	Recap
Aaron Lewicki (4) 10:18 PP		First period	No scoring
Joe Pereira (3) 10:01 PP		Second period	Peter MacArthur (2) 11:48 PP; Josh Lunden (2) 19:11
Cody Purves (4) 5:57; Chad Nehring (3) 8:09		Third period	Jeff May (1) 5:16
Jerry Kuhn 37 shots / 34 saves		Goalie stats	Mitch O'Keefe 45 shots / 41 saves

April 21	Idaho Steelheads	1-4	Las Vegas Wranglers	CenturyLink Arena Boise	Recap
Joe Pereira (4) 10:52		First period	Adam Miller (2) 5:49
No scoring		Second period	Geoff Paukovich (2) 7:08
No scoring		Third period	Ash Goldie (2) 1:56; Chris Francis (2) 13:45
Jerry Kuhn 49 shots / 45 saves		Goalie stats	Joe Fallon 26 shots / 25 saves

April 22	Idaho Steelheads	1-2	OT	Las Vegas Wranglers	CenturyLink Arena Boise	Recap
No scoring		First period		No scoring
Ron Meyers (2) 10:11		Second period		Adam Miller (3) 17:25
No scoring		Third period		No scoring
No scoring		First overtime period		Eric Lampe (3) 10:46
Jerry Kuhn 53 shots / 51 saves		Goalie stats		Joe Fallon 35 shots / 34 saves

Las Vegas wins series 4-1

== Conference Finals ==
Note: Home team is listed first.

=== Eastern Conference ===
==== (3) Kalamazoo Wings vs. (5) Florida Everblades ====
This was Kalamazoo's second consecutive Conference Final, and Florida's fourth in the past nine seasons. Their previous meeting was in 2011, where Kalamazoo beat Florida 3-1 in the first round. During the regular season, Florida beat Kalamazoo 3-2, with one loss in overtime and one win and one loss in shootout. The series marked the return of John Muse from his lower-body injury (suffered in Game 3 against Elmira in the Conference Semifinals) in a 7-0 shutout at home for Game 3.

April 27	Kalamazoo Wings	0–2	Florida Everblades	Wings Stadium	Recap
No scoring		First period	Bobby Raymond (2) 15:54
No scoring		Second period	Trevor Bruess (4) 13:55
No scoring		Third period	No scoring
Riley Gill 38 shots / 36 saves		Goalie stats	Pat Nagle 34 shots / 34 saves

April 28	Kalamazoo Wings	3–2	Florida Everblades	Wings Stadium	Recap
No scoring		First period	Brayden Irwin (2) 14:28
No scoring		Second period	No scoring
Kory Karlander (3) 6:18 PP; Darren Archibald (1) 8:11; Dustin Cloutier (4) 17:32		Third period	Matt Beca (5) 15:01
Riley Gill 38 shots / 36 saves		Goalie stats	Pat Nagle 19 shots / 16 saves

May 2	Florida Everblades	7–0	Kalamazoo Wings	Germain Arena	Recap
Mathieu Roy (3) 9:27		First period	No scoring
Brayden Irwin (3) 0:20; Sebastien Piche (2) 1:02 PP; Brayden Irwin (4) 4:36; Justin Shugg (1) 7:16; Brayden Irwin (5) 8:38 PP		Second period	No scoring
Justin Shugg (2) 16:58 PP		Third period	No scoring
John Muse 28 shots / 28 saves		Goalie stats	Riley Gill 14 shots / 10 saves Maxime Clermont 18 shots / 15 saves

May 3	Florida Everblades	7–3	Kalamazoo Wings	Germain Arena	Recap
David Rutherford (3) 17:01		First period	No scoring
Charles Landry (1) 2:33; David Fischer (3) 10:26 PP		Second period	Dwight Helminen (4) 15:27
Mathieu Roy (4) 18:27 PP; David Rutherford (4) 18:51		Third period	Darren Archibald (2) 8:17; Dwight Helminen (5) 10:33 PP
John Muse 31 shots / 28 saves		Goalie stats	Riley Gill 25 shots / 18 saves

May 5	Florida Everblades	3–1	Kalamazoo Wings	Germain Arena	Recap
No scoring		First period	No scoring
Mike Ratchuk (1) 9:02; Justin Shugg (3) 18:11 PP		Second period	Kory Karlander (4) 12:13 PP
Trevor Bruess (5) 5:56		Third period	No scoring
John Muse 28 shots / 27 saves		Goalie stats	Riley Gill 24 shots / 21 saves

Florida wins series 4–1

=== Western Conference ===
==== (1) Alaska Aces vs. (3) Las Vegas Wranglers ====
This was the third playoff meeting between the two franchises; Alaska won in the 2006 West Division Finals, 4-2, and 2009 National Conference finals 4-0, while Las Vegas won the 2008 National Conference Semifinals 4-1, giving Alaska a historical 9-6 lead. It was the second consecutive Conference Final for Alaska, and their sixth in eight seasons, and the third Final for Las Vegas in five seasons. During the regular season, Las Vegas beat Alaska 5-4, with Alaska winning a game in shootout, and Las Vegas winning two shootout games.

April 26	Las Vegas Wranglers	1–2	Alaska Aces	Orleans Arena	Recap
No scoring		First period	No scoring
Scott Campbell (5) 17:29		Second period	Ryan Cruthers (3) 9:07 PP
No scoring		Third period	Ryan Cruthers (4) 15:54
Joe Fallon 32 shots / 30 saves		Goalie stats	Gerald Coleman 26 shots / 25 saves

April 27	Las Vegas Wranglers	3–0	Alaska Aces	Orleans Arena	Recap
Josh Lunden (3) 1:28; Scott Campbell (6) 4:06; Scott Campbell (7) 19:18		First period	No scoring
No scoring		Second period	No scoring
No scoring		Third period	No scoring
Joe Fallon 23 shots / 23 saves		Goalie stats	Gerald Coleman 15 shots / 12 saves James Reid 13 shots / 13 saves

April 29	Alaska Aces	2–3	OT	Las Vegas Wranglers	Sullivan Arena	Recap
Kane Lafranchise (1) 9:01 PP		First period		Jeff May (2) 5:01 PP
No scoring		Second period		Judd Blackwater (2) 9:25
Scott Howes (1) 9:04		Third period		No scoring
No scoring		First overtime period		Eric Lampe (4) 3:11
Gerald Coleman 34 shots / 31 saves		Goalie stats		Joe Fallon 31 shots / 29 saves

May 1	Alaska Aces	2–3	Las Vegas Wranglers	Sullivan Arena	Recap
No scoring		First period	Judd Blackwater (3) 1:49; Eric Lampe (5) 11:25
Dan Kissel (4) 19:05		Second period	Peter MacArthur (3) 7:01
Chad Anderson (1) 19:55		Third period	No scoring
Gerald Coleman 24 shots / 21 saves		Goalie stats	Joe Fallon 26 shots / 24 saves

May 2	Alaska Aces	1–3	Las Vegas Wranglers	Sullivan Arena	Recap
Dan Kissel (5) 5:22 PP		First period	Eric Lampe (6) 14:28 PP; Judd Blackwater (4) 18:22
No scoring		Second period	No scoring
No scoring		Third period	Josh Lunden (4) 19:57 EN/SH
Gerald Coleman 26 shots / 24 saves		Goalie stats	Joe Fallon 18 shots / 17 saves

Las Vegas wins series 4–1

== Kelly Cup Finals ==
=== (3) Las Vegas Wranglers vs. (5) Florida Everblades ===
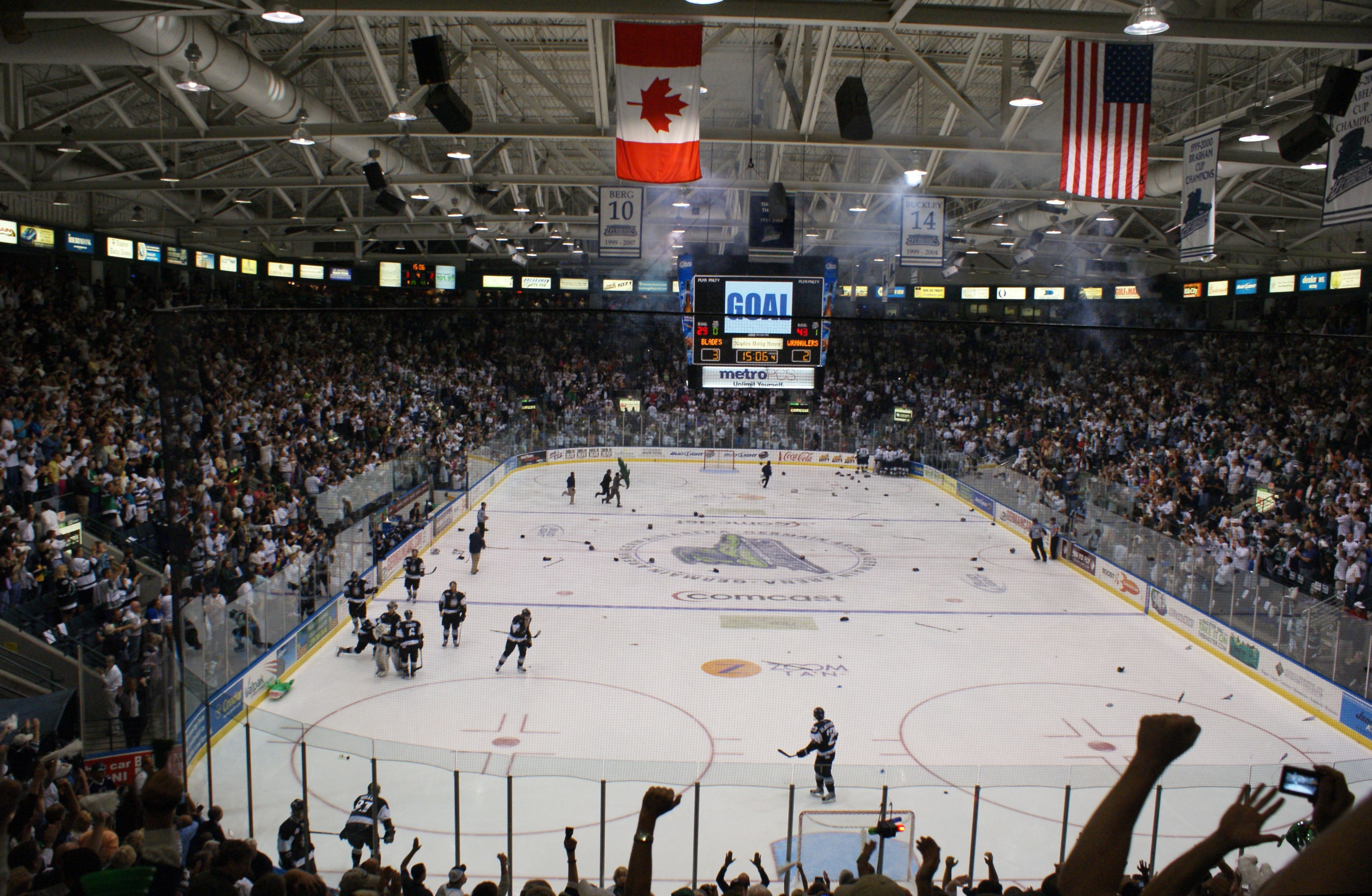
The Everblades celebrate their victory in Game 5 of the Kelly Cup Finals on May 23, 2012.

This is the first playoff meeting between the two franchises, and the first time either has played the other since 2005. They have met 5 times during the regular season (once in 2003, twice in 2004, and twice in 2005), with Florida leading the series 4-1; Las Vegas's sole victory prior to Game 1 was a shutout at Florida in 2005. Game 1 was only the second time Florida played at the Orleans Arena. Florida's 7-2 victory in Game 2 marks the largest margin of defeat for Las Vegas during the 2012 Kelly Cup playoffs, and ties for the most points scored by a team in any game during the postseason (Florida also scored 7 points on Kalamazoo twice). The 3-game stand for Games 3, 4, and 5 were billed as pitting the Everblades 8-0 postseason home record against Las Vegas' 7-1 postseason away record. Game 3 marked the first home victory in a Kelly Cup final for Florida, and Game 5 saw the Everblades win the cup in front of a standing-room-only crowd.

May 14	Las Vegas Wranglers	2–1	Florida Everblades	Orleans Arena	Recap
Peter MacArthur (4) 13:43		First period	No scoring
Eric Lampe (7) 14:04 PP		Second period	No scoring
No scoring		Third period	Mike Ratchuk (2) 18:00
Joe Fallon 33 shots / 32 saves		Goalie stats	John Muse 23 shots / 21 saves

May 15	Las Vegas Wranglers	2–7	Florida Everblades	Orleans Arena	Recap
Chris Francis (3) 10:20; Judd Blackwater (5) 15:36		First period	No scoring
No scoring		Second period	Mathieu Roy (5) 2:22 PP; Justin Shugg (4) 14:10; Matt Marquardt (4)16:42 PP
No scoring		Third period	David Rutherford (5) 3:15; Cedric Lalonde-McNicoll (4) 5:10; Brandon MacLean (2) 7:03; Leigh Salters (4) 18:15
Joe Fallon 28 shots / 21 saves		Goalie stats	John Muse 29 shots / 27 saves

May 18	Florida Everblades	4–3	OT	Las Vegas Wranglers	Germain Arena	Recap
Mike Ratchuk (3) 8:23		First period		No scoring
Alex McGinnis (1) 3:18		Second period		Adam Huxley (1) 0:27; Scott Campbell (8) 2:08; Judd Blackwater (6) 9:14 PP
Justin Shugg (5) 16:11		Third period		No scoring
Matt Marquardt (5) 13:49		First overtime period		No scoring
John Muse 35 shots / 32 saves		Goalie stats		Joe Fallon 34 shots / 30 saves

May 22	Florida Everblades	3–1	Las Vegas Wranglers	Germain Arena	Recap
Brandon MacLean (3) 17:55		First period	No scoring
Matt Marquardt (6) 5:15		Second period	Peter MacArthur (5) 6:32
Justin Shugg (6) 15:37		Third period	No scoring
John Muse 30 shots / 29 saves		Goalie stats	Joe Fallon 30 shots / 27 saves

May 23	Florida Everblades	3–2	OT	Las Vegas Wranglers	Germain Arena	Recap
Justin Shugg (7) 12:07; Mike Ratchuk (4) 18:46		First period		No scoring
No scoring		Second period		Ash Goldie (3) 9:26
No scoring		Third period		Peter MacArthur (6) 0:47
Brandon MacLean (4) 4:54		First overtime period		No scoring
John Muse 43 shots / 41 saves		Goalie stats		Joe Fallon 29 shots / 26 saves

Florida wins Kelly Cup 4–1

== Statistical leaders ==
=== Skaters ===
Player	Team	GP	G	A	Pts	+/–	PIM
Eric Lampe	Las Vegas Wranglers	17	7	14	21	8	30
Cedric Lalonde-McNicoll	Florida Everblades	18	4	17	21	8	8
Matt Marquardt	Florida Everblades	18	6	12	18	6	6
Adam Miller	Las Vegas Wranglers	18	3	15	18	7	26
Judd Blackwater	Las Vegas Wranglers	18	6	8	14	4	20
Matt Beca	Florida Everblades	18	5	9	14	0	0
Nick Sirota	Kalamazoo Wings	14	7	6	13	-1	22
Brayden Irwin	Florida Everblades	17	6	7	13	6	10
Brandon MacLean	Florida Everblades	18	4	9	13	14	0
Trent Daavettila	Kalamazoo Wings	14	3	10	13	-9	2

GP = Games played; G = Goals; A = Assists; Pts = Points; +/– = Plus/minus; PIM = Penalty minutes

=== Goaltending ===
Player	Team	GP	W	L	SA	GA	GAA	SV%	SO	TOI
Pat Nagle	Florida Everblades	6	4	1	136	8	1.42	0.941	2	338
John Muse	Florida Everblades	13	11	2	377	23	1.78	0.939	1	776
Mitch O'Keefe	Las Vegas Wranglers	6	5	1	188	11	1.83	0.941	1	360
Gerald Coleman	Alaska Aces	10	5	3	254	19	2.00	0.925	1	569
Joe Fallon	Las Vegas Wranglers	12	7	3	345	27	2.15	0.922	1	752

GP = Games played; W = Wins; L = Losses; SA = Shots against; GA = Goals against; GAA = Goals against average; SV% = Save percentage; SO = Shutouts; TOI = Time on ice (in minutes)

== See also ==
- 2011–12 ECHL season
- List of ECHL seasons

Preceded by 2011 Kelly Cup playoffs	Kelly Cup Playoffs; 2012	Succeeded by 2013 Kelly Cup playoffs
