= 2013–14 St. John's IceCaps season =

Ice hockey league in the United States and Canada

2013–14 St. John's IceCaps
- Eastern Conference champions
- Division: 2nd Atlantic
- Conference: 4th Eastern
- 2013–14 record: 46–23–2–5 (99 pts)
- Home record: 22–10–1–3
- Road record: 24–13–1–2
- Goals for: 258
- Goals against: 207

Team information
- General manager: Craig Heisinger
- Coach: Keith McCambridge
- Assistant coach: Jason King; Mark Morrison
- Arena: Mile One Centre

Team leaders
- Goals: John Albert (28)
- Assists: Jason Jaffray (41)
- Points: Jason Jaffray (59)
- Penalty minutes: J.C. Lipon (136)
- Plus/minus: (+) Ben Chiarot (+29) (−) Adam Pardy (−4)
- Wins: Edward Pasquale; Michael Hutchinson (17)
- Goals against average: Tyler Beskorowany (2.20)

The 2013–14 St. John's IceCaps season was the franchise's third season in the American Hockey League, which began on October 4, 2013. The IceCaps hosted the 2014 All-Star Classic at Mile One Centre on February 11 and 12, in which American Hockey League all-star players played the Swedish team Färjestad BK.

== Off-season ==
Jason King, a 31-year-old who had been a winger for the IceCaps the previous two seasons, retired as a player on August 30 and became an assistant coach with the team effective this season. King had been limited to nine games last season due to concussion problems. In addition to King, St. John's saw the departure of many of its veteran players from the previous season, including forwards Aaron Gagnon, Jason Gregoire, Maxime Macenauer, Ben Maxwell and Ray Sawada, as well as defensemen Derek Meech and Travis Ramsey. Defenseman Dean Arsene also left the team, and Ivan Telegin, a 21-year-old forward who had been considered one of the organizations's better prospects, was suspended on September 29 after refusing to report to the IceCaps. Officials declined to elaborate on the failure to report except to say it was for "personal reasons".

The loss of veteran players meant the team underwent major changes in the off-season. St. John's signed new wingers Andrew Gordon and Jérôme Samson, two AHL veterans with more than 70 career points, which IceCaps officials hoped would improve the team's depth. Coach Keith McCambridge also thought those additions, as well as the signing of Blair Riley, would make the team's forwards faster and more physical. Patrice Cormier and Zach Redmond, who both saw time with the Winnipeg Jets the previous season, were assigned to St. John's during the final round of cuts from the NHL team's training camp. The IceCaps re-signed John Albert, Will O'Neill and Ryan Schnell. Goaltender Juho Olkinuora also joined the roster, having signed with the team the previous spring and played a single game for St. John's last season. Other off-season new additions included forwards Austen Brassard, J.C. Lipon, and Kyle MacKinnon, and defensemen Travis Ehrhardt, Brenden Kichton, Cody Lampl, Kris Fredheim, Jordan Hill, and Adam Pardy.

The IceCaps played three pre-season games against Syracuse Crunch in a Mary's Cup American Hockey League exhibition series. The first game on September 26 was a 5-2 loss to Syracuse Crunch, who scored three unanswered, unassisted goals in the third period. Samson and Carl Klingberg both allowed turnovers that led to Syracuse goals, and the Crunch scored an empty-netter after O'Neill surrendered the puck when he had to discard a broken stick. Syracuse then clinched the series with a 1-0 shutout on September 28. The IceCaps won 3-2 in the third and final game on September 29, ending a five-game pre-season losing streak against the Crunch. Gordon shot the game-winner in the third, scoring 27 seconds after Syracuse had tied the game. IceCaps defensemen Ehrhardt, Fredheim, Redmond and Julian Melchiori all sustained injuries before the start of the regular season.

2013–14 Preseason Game Log: 1–2–0–0 (Home: 1–1–0–0; Road: 0–1–0–0)

#	Date	Visitor	Score	Home	OT	Decision	Record
1	September 26	Syracuse	5–2	St. John's		Hutchinson	0–1–0–0
2	September 28	St. John's	0–1	Syracuse		Olkinuora	0–2–0–0
3	September 29	Syracuse	2–3	St. John's		Pasquale	1–2–0–0

== Regular season ==
=== October ===
The IceCaps started the season with two home games against the Providence Bruins on October 4 and 5, losing the first one 4–3 in overtime after St. John's tied the game by scoring twice in the final two minutes of regulation. The IceCaps won the second game 5–1, with Eric O'Dell scoring his third career hat-trick. St. John's scored made more than 40 shots in each of the two opening games. The IceCaps lost their next two games in regulation, starting with a 3–2 defeat on October 11 against the Hamilton Bulldogs, who scored two-shorthanded goals against them. The next day they lost 6–3 to the Toronto Marlies, with T. J. Brennan scoring a hat-trick against them. St. John's then split a pair of home games against the Hershey Bears on October 18 and 19, winning the first one 5–1 after scoring four goals in the third period, including goals from Ben Chiarot and Jason Jaffray within 74 seconds of each other. They lost the next game 4–0, failing to score on 30 shots on goal and five power play opportunities.

Adam Pardy was called up to the Winnipeg Jets on October 19 to replace the injured Jacob Trouba. The IceCaps next departed on a six-game road trip, starting with three games in as many days. Fredheim returned to the roster on October 25, when St. John's dealt the Manchester Monarchs their first regulation loss of the season. The IceCaps lost their next two games, including a 5–3 loss to Manchester on October 26 in which they failed to score until the third period, and a 5-3 loss to Providence after allowing the first four goals. Chairot was recalled to Winnipeg on October 29 to replace the injured Paul Postma, making him the second defenseman along with Pardy to leave the IceCaps in a 10-day span. St. John's ended their two-game losing streak with a weekend sweep over the Portland Pirates on October 30 and November 1, with Carl Klingberg scoring two goals and an assist in the first game.

=== November ===
The IceCaps concluded their six-game road trip with a 3–0 loss to the Worcester Sharks on November 2, after which Zach Redmond was recalled by the Winnipeg Jets.

== Schedule and results ==
2013–14 Game Log – Regular season
October: 4–5–1–0 (Home: 2–1–1–0; Road: 2–4–0–0)

#	Date	Visitor	Score	Home	OT	Decision	Attendance	Record	Pts	Gamesheet
1	October 4	Providence	4–3	St. John's	OT	Pasquale	6,287	0–0–1–0	1	Gamesheet
2	October 5	Providence	1–5	St. John's		Pasquale	6,287	1–0–1–0	3	Gamesheet
3	October 11	St. John's	2–3	Hamilton		Pasquale	5,193	1–1–1–0	3	Gamesheet
4	October 12	St. John's	3–6	Toronto		Olkinuora	2,756	1–2–1–0	3	Gamesheet
5	October 18	Hershey	1–5	St. John's		Pasquale	6,287	2–2–1–0	5	Gamesheet
6	October 19	Hershey	4–0	St. John's		Pasquale	6,287	2–3–1–0	5	Gamesheet
7	October 25	St. John's	3–2	Manchester		Pasquale	3,998	3–3–1–0	7	Gamesheet
8	October 26	St. John's	3–5	Manchester		Olkinuora	3,839	3–4–1–0	7	Gamesheet
9	October 27	St. John's	2–5	Providence		Pasquale	5,015	3–5–1–0	7	Gamesheet
10	October 30	St. John's	5–1	Portland		Pasquale	1,314	4–5–1–0	9	Gamesheet

November: 7–4–0–2 (Home: 2–1–0–2; Road: 5–3–0–0)

#	Date	Visitor	Score	Home	OT	Decision	Attendance	Record	Pts	Gamesheet
11	November 1	St. John's	4–2	Portland		Pasquale	2,127	5–5–1–0	11	Gamesheet
12	November 2	St. John's	0–3	Worcester		Pasquale	2,760	5–6–1–0	11	Gamesheet
13	November 8	Manchester	2–5	St. John's		Pasquale	6,287	6–6–1–0	13	Gamesheet
14	November 9	Manchester	3–2	St. John's		Pasquale	6,287	6–7–1–0	13	Gamesheet
15	November 13	Worcester	2–3	St. John's	OT	Pasquale	6,287	7–7–1–0	15	Gamesheet
16	November 15	Worcester	3–2	St. John's	SO	Pasquale	6,287	7–7–1–1	16	Gamesheet
17	November 16	Worcester	2–1	St. John's	SO	Pasquale	6,287	7–7–1–2	17	Gamesheet
18	November 22	St. John's	2–1	WB/Scranton		Pasquale	4,136	8–7–1–2	19	Gamesheet
19	November 23	St. John's	2–5	WB/Scranton		Pasquale	5,102	8–8–1–2	19	Gamesheet
20	November 24	St. John's	4–3	Bridgeport		Pasquale	3,582	9–8–1–2	21	Gamesheet
21	November 27	St. John's	4–2	Hershey		Pasquale	8,618	10–8–1–2	23	Gamesheet
22	November 29	St. John's	2–4	Syracuse		Pasquale	5,438	10–9–1–2	23	Gamesheet
23	November 30	St. John's	4–3	Binghamton	SO	Olkinuora	3,714	11–9–1–2	25	Gamesheet

December: 5–4–0–0 (Home: 3–1–0–0; Road: 2–3–0–0)

#	Date	Visitor	Score	Home	OT	Decision	Attendance	Record	Pts	Gamesheet
24	December 6	WB/Scranton	0–5	St. John's		Pasquale	6,287	12–9–1–2	27	Gamesheet
25	December 7	WB/Scranton	3–0	St. John's		Pasquale	6,287	12–10–1–2	27	Gamesheet
26	December 10	Syracuse	2–6	St. John's		Olkinuora	6,287	13–10–1–2	29	Gamesheet
27	December 11	Syracuse	1–5	St. John's		Pasquale	6,287	14–10–1–2	31	Gamesheet
28	December 14	St. John's	3–0	Hamilton		Olkinuora	3,113	15–10–1–2	33	Gamesheet
29	December 15	St. John's	2–3	Toronto		Hutchinson	5,751	15–11–1–2	33	Gamesheet
30	December 27	St. John's	2–5	Worcester		Olkinuora	3,698	15–12–1–2	33	Gamesheet
31	December 28	St. John's	3–1	Manchester		Pasquale	4,822	16–12–1–2	35	Gamesheet
32	December 31	St. John's	2–4	Springfield		Pasquale	2,778	16–13–1–2	35	Gamesheet

January: 9–3–0–0 (Home: 5–3–0–0; Road: 4–0–0–0)

#	Date	Visitor	Score	Home	OT	Decision	Attendance	Record	Pts	Gamesheet
33	January 4	Portland	1–3	St. John's		Pasquale	6,287	17–13–1–2	37	Gamesheet
34	January 5	Portland	5–4	St. John's		Olkinuora	6,287	17–14–1–2	37	Gamesheet
35	January 7	Portland	2–4	St. John's		Pasquale	6,287	18–14–1–2	39	Gamesheet
36	January 10	Toronto	3–2	St. John's		Pasquale	6,287	18–15–1–2	39	Gamesheet
37	January 11	Toronto	4–5	St. John's	SO	Pasquale	6,287	19–15–1–2	41	Gamesheet
38	January 17	Manchester	1–4	St. John's		Pasquale	6,287	20–15–1–2	43	Gamesheet
39	January 18	Manchester	6–0	St. John's		Pasquale	6,287	20–16–1–2	43	Gamesheet
40	January 20	Manchester	0–2	St. John's		Hutchinson	6,287	21–16–1–2	45	Gamesheet
41	January 24	St. John's	5–4	Providence		Hutchinson	8,542	22–16–1–2	47	Gamesheet
42	January 25	St. John's	6–2	Hartford		Hutchinson	5,063	23–16–1–2	49	Gamesheet
43	January 26	St. John's	3–1	Providence		Hutchinson	9,731	24–16–1–2	51	Gamesheet
44	January 31	St. John's	7–4	Portland		Hutchinson	1,734	25–16–1–2	53	Gamesheet

February: 8–3–0–1 (Home: 3–2–0–0; Road: 5–1–0–1)

#	Date	Visitor	Score	Home	OT	Decision	Attendance	Record	Pts	Gamesheet
45	February 1	St. John's	3–1	Manchester		Hutchinson	4,846	26–16–1–2	55	Gamesheet
46	February 4	Providence	3–2	St. John's		Hutchinson	6,287	26–17–1–2	55	Gamesheet
47	February 5	Providence	3–4	St. John's	SO	Pasquale	6,287	27–17–1–2	57	Gamesheet
48	February 8	Worcester	2–5	St. John's		Hutchinson	6,287	28–17–1–2	59	Gamesheet
49	February 9	Worcester	4–2	St. John's		Hutchinson	6,287	28–18–1–2	59	Gamesheet
50	February 14	St. John's	2–3	Providence		Hutchinson	6,759	28–19–1–2	59	Gamesheet
51	February 16	St. John's	4–3	Manchester	SO	Hutchinson	5,394	28–19–1–3	60	Gamesheet
52	February 18	St. John's	7–5	Portland		Hutchinson	1,618	29–19–1–3	62	Gamesheet
53	February 21	St. John's	5–1	Worcester		Hutchinson	3,509	30–19–1–3	64	Gamesheet
54	February 22	St. John's	3–1	Worcester		Hutchinson	4,087	31–19–1–3	66	Gamesheet
55	February 23	St. John's	6–5	Portland		Beskorowany	1,946	32–19–1–3	68	Gamesheet
56	February 28	Binghamton	2–6	St. John's		Hutchinson	6,287	33–19–1–3	70	Gamesheet

March: 8–3–0–1 (Home: 5–1–0–0; Road: 3–2–0–1)

#	Date	Visitor	Score	Home	OT	Decision	Attendance	Record	Pts	Gamesheet
57	March 1	Binghamton	0–1	St. John's		Hutchinson	6,287	34–19–1–3	72	Gamesheet
58	March 7	Bridgeport	2–3	St. John's		Hutchinson	6,287	35–19–1–3	74	Gamesheet
59	March 8	Bridgeport	2–3	St. John's	OT	Hutchinson	6,287	36–19–1–3	76	Gamesheet
60	March 12	Portland	1–5	St. John's		Hutchinson	6,287	37–19–1–3	78	Gamesheet
61	March 14	Portland	7–4	St. John's		Hutchinson	6,287	37–20–1–3	78	Gamesheet
62	March 15	Portland	2–3	St. John's		Beskorowany	6,287	38–20–1–3	80	Gamesheet
63	March 21	St. John's	6–1	Hartford		Beskorowany	5,113	39–20–1–3	82	Gamesheet
64	March 22	St. John's	2–1	Bridgeport	SO	Beskorowany	3,855	40–20–1–3	84	Gamesheet
65	March 23	St. John's	5–4	Springfield		Olkinuora	3,852	41–20–1–3	86	Gamesheet
66	March 26	St. John's	2–3	Syracuse		Beskorowany	4,432	41–21–1–3	86	Gamesheet
67	March 28	St. John's	1–2	Binghamton		Beskorowany	4,068	41–22–1–3	86	Gamesheet
68	March 29	St. John's	1–2	Hershey	SO	Beskorowany	10,506	41–22–1–4	87	Gamesheet

April: 5–1–1–1 (Home: 2–1–0–1; Road: 3–0–1–0)

#	Date	Visitor	Score	Home	OT	Decision	Attendance	Record	Pts	Gamesheet
69	April 4	Springfield	7–8	St. John's	OT	Beskorowany	6,287	41–22–2–4	88	Gamesheet
70	April 5	Springfield	3–1	St. John's		Beskorowany	6,287	41–23–2–4	88	Gamesheet
71	April 8	Hamilton	1–3	St. John's		Beskorowany	6,287	42–23–2–4	90	Gamesheet
72	April 9	Hamilton	4–3	St. John's	SO	Beskorowany	6,287	42–23–2–5	91	Gamesheet
73	April 12	Hartford	7–2	St. John's		Comrie	6,287	43–23–2–5	93	Gamesheet
74	April 13	Hartford	2–6	St. John's		Beskorowany	6,287	44–23–2–5	95	Gamesheet
75	April 18	St. John's	6–0	Worcester		Hutchinson	4,909	45–23–2–5	97	Gamesheet
76	April 19	St. John's	5–4	Portland		Hutchinson	550	46–23–2–5	99	Gamesheet

Legend: Win (2 points) Loss (0 points) Overtime/shootout loss (1-point)

== Playoffs ==
=== Game log ===
The St. John's IceCaps entered the Calder Cup playoffs as the 4th seed in the Eastern Conference. They began the playoffs playing the Albany Devils where they went on to win the series in 4 games. In the Eastern Conference Semifinals they defeated the Norfolk Admirals in a Game 6. They moved on the Conference Finals for the second time in team history where they went on to defeat the Wilkes-Barre/Scranton Penguins in a 5–0 rout in Game 6, winning their first Richard F. Canning Trophy.

They faced the Texas Stars in the Calder Cup Finals where they would go on to lose in a Game 5 overtime lose.

2014 Calder Cup Playoffs
Eastern Conference Quarterfinals vs. Albany Devils: St. John's won series 3–1

#	Date	Visitor	Score	Home	OT	Decision	Attendance	Series	Recap
1	April 25	St. John's	2–1	Albany		Hutchinson	6,572	1–0	Recap
2	April 26	St. John's	2–4	Albany		Hutchinson	8,026	1–1	Recap
3	April 30	Albany	0–1	St. John's		Hutchinson	6,287	2–1	Recap
4	May 2	Albany	1–4	St. John's		Hutchinson	6,287	3–1	Recap

Eastern Conference Semifinals vs. Norfolk Admirals: St. John's won series 4–2

#	Date	Visitor	Score	Home	OT	Decision	Attendance	Series	Recap
1	May 6	Norfolk	3–1	St. John's		Hutchinson	6,287	0–1	Recap
2	May 7	Norfolk	1–2	St. John's		Hutchinson	6,287	1–1	Recap
3	May 10	St. John's	5–3	Norfolk		Hutchinson	3,957	2–1	Recap
4	May 12	St. John's	5–1	Norfolk		Hutchinson	2,112	3–1	Recap
5	May 13	St. John's	2–3	Norfolk	OT	Hutchinson	1,736	3–2	Recap
6	May 16	Norfolk	2–5	St. John's		Hutchinson	6,287	4–2	Recap

Eastern Conference Final vs. Wilkes-Barre/Scranton Penguins: St. John's won series 4–2

#	Date	Visitor	Score	Home	OT	Decision	Attendance	Series	Recap
1	May 24	Wilkes-Barre/Scranton	3–2	St. John's		Hutchinson	6,287	0–1	Recap
2	May 25	Wilkes-Barre/Scranton	1–2	St. John's		Hutchinson	6,287	1–1	Recap
3	May 28	St. John's	5–0	Wilkes-Barre/Scranton		Hutchinson	3,553	2–1	Recap
4	May 29	St. John's	2–1	Wilkes-Barre/Scranton		Hutchinson	3,382	3–1	Recap
5	May 31	St. John's	2–4	Wilkes-Barre/Scranton		Hutchinson	4,660	3–2	Recap
6	June 3	Wilkes-Barre/Scranton	0–5	St. John's		Hutchinson	6,287	4–2	Recap

Calder Cup Final vs. Texas Stars: Texas won series 4–1

#	Date	Visitor	Score	Home	OT	Decision	Attendance	Series	Recap
1	June 8	St. John's	3–6	Texas		Hutchinson	5,625	0–1	Recap
2	June 9	St. John's	2–1	Texas		Hutchinson	5,224	1–1	Recap
3	June 11	Texas	2–1	St. John's	OT	Hutchinson	6,287	1–2	Recap
4	June 16	Texas	4–3	St. John's	OT	Hutchinson	6,287	1–3	Recap
5	June 17	Texas	4–3	St. John's	OT	Hutchinson	6,287	1–4	Recap

Legend: = Win = Loss = Playoff series win

== Player statistics ==
=== Skaters ===
Note: GP = Games played; G = Goals; A = Assists; Pts = Points; +/− = Plus/minus; PIM = Penalty minutes
Updated as of June 10, 2014

Regular season
Player	GP	G	A	Pts	+/-	PIM
Jason Jaffray	76	18	41	59	13	48
Andrew Gordon	76	23	34	57	3	43
Jérôme Samson	68	27	29	56	6	49
Kael Mouillierat	60	20	33	53	1	48
Brenden Kichton^{*}	76	10	38	48	8	14
John Albert	63	28	17	45	6	20
Carl Klingberg	65	22	20	42	15	42
Eric O'Dell	42	17	25	42	9	35
J.C. Lipon^{*}	72	9	32	41	0	136
Kyle MacKinnon	71	12	27	39	17	32
Will O'Neill	68	9	26	35	6	80
Adam Lowry^{*}	64	17	16	33	−1	49
Patrice Cormier^{‡}	61	9	17	26	2	98
Zach Redmond^{‡}	40	6	19	25	18	26
Blair Riley	71	7	14	21	14	133
Ben Chiarot	65	6	14	20	29	96
Jordan Hill	68	0	12	12	1	54
Julian Melchiori	50	1	10	11	19	32
Josh Lunden	23	6	4	10	2	20
Paul Postma	4	1	5	6	0	4
Austen Brassard^{*}	29	3	2	5	0	26
Kris Fredheim	48	1	4	5	8	46
Brandon MacLean	7	1	0	1	0	4
Travis Ehrhardt	8	1	0	1	−3	4
Ryan Schnell	39	1	0	1	−3	120
Josh Morrissey	8	0	1	1	1	2
Ian O'Connor^{‡}	3	0	1	1	−1	0
Cody Sol	1	0	0	0	0	0
Colton Beck	3	0	0	0	0	0
Adam Pardy^{‡}	3	0	0	0	−4	9
Cody Lampl	38	0	0	0	−1	32

Playoffs
Player	GP	G	A	Pts	+/-	PIM
Andrew Gordon	18	8	9	17	3	22
Will O'Neill	15	3	11	14	−1	27
Eric O'Dell	18	9	4	13	4	16
Zach Redmond	18	2	10	12	10	12
Jason Jaffray	17	4	7	11	6	30
Kael Mouillierat	18	5	5	10	−1	14
Josh Morrissey	17	2	7	9	2	20
Brenden Kichton	18	2	5	7	1	2
John Albert	18	1	6	7	5	18
Jérôme Samson	14	3	3	6	−1	2
Patrice Cormier	18	2	4	6	3	20
Carl Klingberg	18	2	4	6	7	12
Kyle MacKinnon	18	2	3	5	2	10
Blair Riley	18	2	3	5	1	16
Adam Lowry	14	2	2	4	1	16
Ben Chiarot	18	1	3	4	7	16
Jordan Hill	16	1	1	2	0	7
Josh Lunden	10	1	0	1	−1	2
Kris Fredheim	9	0	1	1	3	4
J.C. Lipon	14	0	1	1	−1	4

^{†}Denotes player spent time with another team before joining team. Stats reflect time with the team only.
^{‡}Left the team mid-season
^{*}Rookie

=== Goaltenders ===
Note: GP = Games played; TOI = Time on Ice; W = Wins; L = Losses; GA = Goals against; GAA = Goals against average; SV = Saves; SA = Shots against; SV% = Save percentage; SO = Shutouts; G = Goals; A = Assists; PIM = Penalty minutes
Updated as of November 4, 2013

Regular season
Player	GP	TOI	W	L	GA	GAA	SV	SA	SV%	SO	G	A	PIM
Tyler Beskorowany	12	683	7	2	25	2.20	370	345	.932	0	0	0	0
Michael Hutchinson	24	1383	17	5	53	2.30	687	634	.923	3	0	0	0
Edward Pasquale	31	1851	17	13	75	2.43	938	863	.920	1	0	0	0
Jussi Olkinuora^{*}	10	554	5	3	30	3.25	280	250	.893	0	0	0	0
Eric Comrie	2	113	0	2	12	6.35	70	58	.829	0	0	0	0

Playoffs
Player	GP	TOI	W	L	GA	GAA	SV	SA	SV%	SO	G	A	PIM
Michael Hutchinson	18	1086	12	6	32	1.77	525	557	.943	3	0	0	0

^{‡}Left the team mid-season
^{*}Rookie

== Milestones ==
Player	Milestone	Reached
J.C. Lipon	1st AHL Game; 1st AHL Goal	October 4, 2013
Adam Lowry	1st AHL Goal	October 4, 2013
Brenden Kichton	1st AHL Game; 1st AHL Assist	October 4, 2013
Brenden Kichton	1st AHL Goal	October 5, 2013
Austen Brassard	1st AHL Game; 1st AHL Goal	October 18, 2013
J.C. Lipon	1st AHL Assist	October 25, 2013
Ian O'Connor	1st AHL Assist	October 26, 2013
