= Daavettila =

Daavettila is a surname. Notable people with the surname include:

- Sara Daavettila (born 1997), American tennis player
- Trent Daavettila (born 1984), American ice hockey player
