= Matt Marquardt =

Canadian ice hockey player (born 1987)

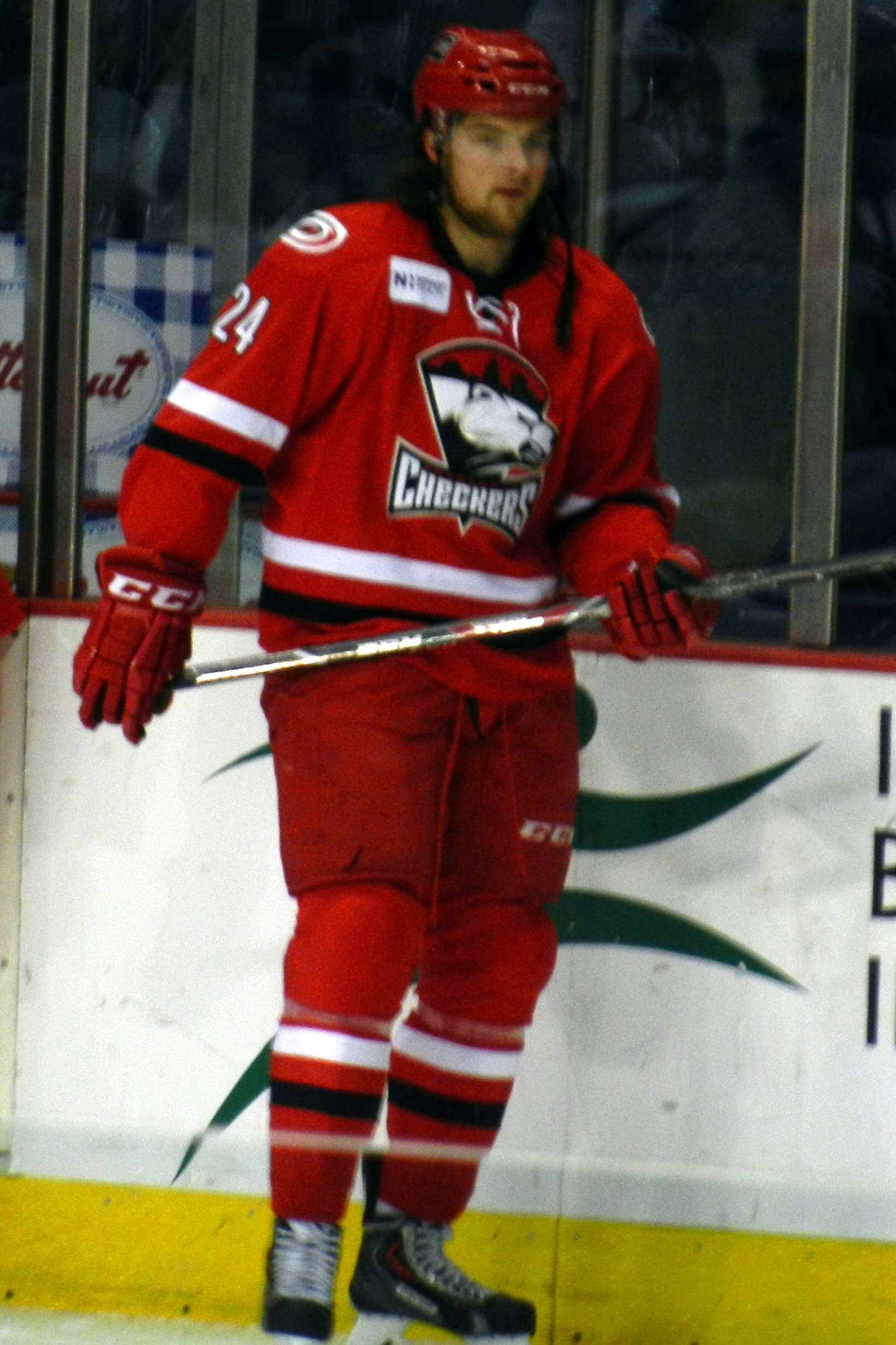
- Born: July 19, 1987 (age 39) North Bay, Ontario, Canada
- Height: 6 ft 3 in (191 cm)
- Weight: 220 lb (100 kg; 15 st 10 lb)
- Position: Left wing
- Shot: Left
- Played for: Providence Bruins; Springfield Falcons; Oklahoma City Barons; Charlotte Checkers; ESV Kaufbeuren; Coventry Blaze; Sheffield Steelers; Dundee Stars
- NHL draft: 194th overall, 2006; Columbus Blue Jackets
- Playing career: 2008–2021

Matt Marquardt (born July 19, 1987) is a Canadian former professional ice hockey left winger. He most recently played for the Jacksonville Icemen of the ECHL. Marquardt was selected by the Columbus Blue Jackets in the 7th round (194th overall) of the 2006 NHL entry draft.

== Playing career ==
=== Major junior ===
A native of North Bay, Ontario, Marquardt wasn't selected in his Ontario Hockey League (OHL) draft year. Instead, Moncton Wildcats head coach, Ted Nolan, enticed him to come east and play in the Quebec Major Junior Hockey League (QMJHL), for the 2005–06 season. The Wildcats couldn't be happier, as Marquardt improved and garnered more ice time as the season progressed, finishing with 25 points, 16 of which were goals. The bruiser was one of the team's many unsung heroes during the 2006 Memorial Cup tournament.

With the departure of several high-end prospects to a variety of AHL destinations, and coach Nolan to the National Hockey League (NHL), Marquardt had an unexpected surge in offensive production, in his second season with Moncton. He was top on the team in both goals and total points. 19 of his 41 goals that season, came while on the powerplay.

After beginning the 2007–08 season with Moncton, he was traded at the deadline to the Baie-Comeau Drakkar. Marquardt registered a career-high 43 goals, split between his time at Moncton and Baie-Comeau, during the regular season. Baie-Comeau would be eliminated in the opening round of the 2008 Memorial Cup playoffs, by Rimouski Océanic.

=== Professional ===
On May 27, 2008, his rights were traded from Columbus to the Boston Bruins, in exchange for defenceman Jonathan Sigalet Two days later, Marquardt signed a 3-year NHL Entry Level contract with the Bruins, on May 29.

Marquardt was assigned to Boston's AHL affiliates, the Providence Bruins, for the 2008–09 season. He made his professional debut on October 8, 2008, in a game against the Lowell Devils. His first professional season with Providence saw Marquardt appear in 71 regular season games, finishing with 22 points. He would also record 9 postseason contests, appearing in the 2009 Calder Cup Playoffs. He registered his first pro playoff assist and first goal, on May 13, and May 16, 2009, respectively. Providence were eliminated in the Conference finals, by eventual champions, the Hershey Bears.

During the 2009–10 season, Marquardt was briefly assigned to Providence's ECHL affiliation, the Reading Royals, on December 29, 2009. He played in 3 games for the Royals, scoring one goal and tallying one assist. He was later recalled by Providence, on January 8, 2010. Marquardt would be reassigned back to the Royals again on February 25, playing in a further 6 games, adding another assist.

On March 2, his rights were traded from Boston to the Edmonton Oilers, in exchange for Cody Wild. Marquardt transferred teams accordingly, and made his debut with the Springfield Falcons, playing in 4 games. He would later be assigned to the Falcons' ECHL affiliates, the Stockton Thunder on March 23, playing in 7 regular season contests, scoring one goal and tallying one assist. He would go on to play in the Thunder's postseason, playing in the 2010 Kelly Cup playoffs, Marquardt played in 15 games, collecting 10 points. Stockton were eliminated in the Conference finals by the Idaho Steelheads.

On September 20, following a four-day stint at the 2010 Edmonton Oilers training camp, Marquardt was assigned to the Oilers' new AHL affiliate team, the Oklahoma City Barons, for the 2010–11 season.

The 2011–12 season found Marquardt in the ECHL full-time, spending the first half of the season with the Bakersfield Condors, with whom he signed a contract on October 2. He was traded to the Florida Everblades on January 6, 2012, for Josh Van Dyk. The move would prove fortuitous for Florida, as Marquardt would assist the team in winning the Kelly Cup in the playoffs. Marquardt scored game-winning goals in Games 3 and 4, and a series winning overtime goal in Game 5 of the Kelly Cup Finals against the Las Vegas Wranglers.

On September 2, 2014, after 6 seasons in the North American minor leagues, Marquardt pursued a career abroad in signing a one-year contract with German club, ESV Kaufbeuren of the DEL2. Marquardt played in 37 contests in Germany for 20 points before returning mid-season in January 2015, to ECHL to play again with the Florida Everblades, helping push team to finish 2 points from first overall and win the Eastern Divisional title. In the 2014–15 season with the Everblades, Marquardt was also named an Alternate Captain of the club and led the league in ECHL for shootout goal percentage 5 for 5 for 100% and shootout game winning goals. In 2015 surpassed 500 games as a professional player.

On August 24, 2015, Marquardt re-signed with the Everblades for his fourth season with the club.

As a free agent the following season, Marquardt left for a second tenure abroad, signing a one-year deal with English-based EIHL club, the Coventry Blaze on July 13, 2016. Marquardt departed Coventry after one season, in May 2017.

After his departure from the Blaze, Marquardt stayed in the UK to sign for fellow Elite Ice Hockey League side Sheffield Steelers ahead of the 2017–18 season.

In late July 2018, Marquardt moved to fellow EIHL side Dundee Stars where he will be player/assistant coach. On May 10, 2019, it was confirmed that he had re-signed to Dundee Stars for the 2019–20 season, captaining the team in addition to his role as player/assistant coach.

Following the suspension of the 2020–21 Elite League season due to COVID-19 pandemic restrictions, Marquardt ended his four-year stay in the UK and returned to the ECHL to sign for Norfolk Admirals on September 24, 2020. However, with Norfolk pulling out of the 2020–21 ECHL season, Marquardt instead signed for fellow ECHL side Jacksonville Icemen on November 20, 2020.

Marquardt retired in 2021, taking up an assistant coach role with the Western Hockey League (WHL)'s Seattle Thunderbirds.

== Personal ==
Marquardt's younger brother Cory, a former hockey player in his own right, is a country singer.

== Career statistics ==
			Regular season					Playoffs
Season	Team	League	GP	G	A	Pts	PIM	GP	G	A	Pts	PIM
2003–04	Huntsville Wildcats	OPJHL	23	5	4	9	10	—	—	—	—	—
2003–04	Brockville Braves	CJHL	11	1	2	3	17	—	—	—	—	—
2004–05	Brockville Braves	CJHL	55	19	22	41	78	7	2	1	3	8
2005–06	Moncton Wildcats	QMJHL	68	16	9	25	69	20	5	3	8	12
2006–07	Moncton Wildcats	QMJHL	67	41	29	70	68	7	1	3	4	14
2007–08	Moncton Wildcats	QMJHL	35	20	13	33	38	—	—	—	—	—
2007–08	Baie–Comeau Drakkar	QMJHL	33	23	13	36	33	5	1	1	2	6
2008–09	Providence Bruins	AHL	71	9	13	22	45	9	1	1	2	2
2009–10	Providence Bruins	AHL	42	1	9	10	21	—	—	—	—	—
2009–10	Reading Royals	ECHL	9	1	2	3	14	—	—	—	—	—
2009–10	Springfield Falcons	AHL	4	0	0	0	4	—	—	—	—	—
2009–10	Stockton Thunder	ECHL	7	1	1	2	4	—	—	—	—	—
2010–11	Oklahoma City Barons	AHL	63	5	7	12	20	—	—	—	—	—
2011–12	Bakersfield Condors	ECHL	34	13	6	19	33	—	—	—	—	—
2011–12	Florida Everblades	ECHL	38	9	14	23	16	18	6	12	18	6
2012–13	Florida Everblades	ECHL	44	15	21	36	19	—	—	—	—	—
2012–13	Charlotte Checkers	AHL	27	5	3	8	2	4	1	1	2	0
2013–14	Charlotte Checkers	AHL	61	6	7	13	64	—	—	—	—	—
2014–15	ESV Kaufbeuren	DEL2	37	8	12	20	32	—	—	—	—	—
2014–15	Florida Everblades	ECHL	40	18	15	33	2	12	2	5	7	2
2015–16	Florida Everblades	ECHL	72	15	30	45	39	6	3	0	3	0
2016–17	Coventry Blaze	EIHL	52	13	22	35	52	—	—	—	—	—
2017–18	Sheffield Steelers	EIHL	53	22	18	40	56	1	0	0	0	0
2018–19	Dundee Stars	EIHL	59	23	23	46	37	—	—	—	—	—
2019–20	Dundee Stars	EIHL	48	20	24	44	32	—	—	—	—	—
2020–21	Jacksonville Icemen	ECHL	16	1	2	3	4	—	—	—	—	—
AHL totals			268	26	39	65	156	13	2	2	4	2
ECHL totals			260	73	91	164	131	51	17	21	38	23
EIHL totals			212	78	87	165	177	1	0	0	0	0

== Awards and honours ==
Award	Year
CJHL
Rookie of the Year	2005
All-star Game MVP	2005
QMJHL
President's Cup (Moncton Wildcats)	2006
ECHL
Kelly Cup (Florida Everblades)	2012
