= Judd Blackwater =

Canadian ice hockey player

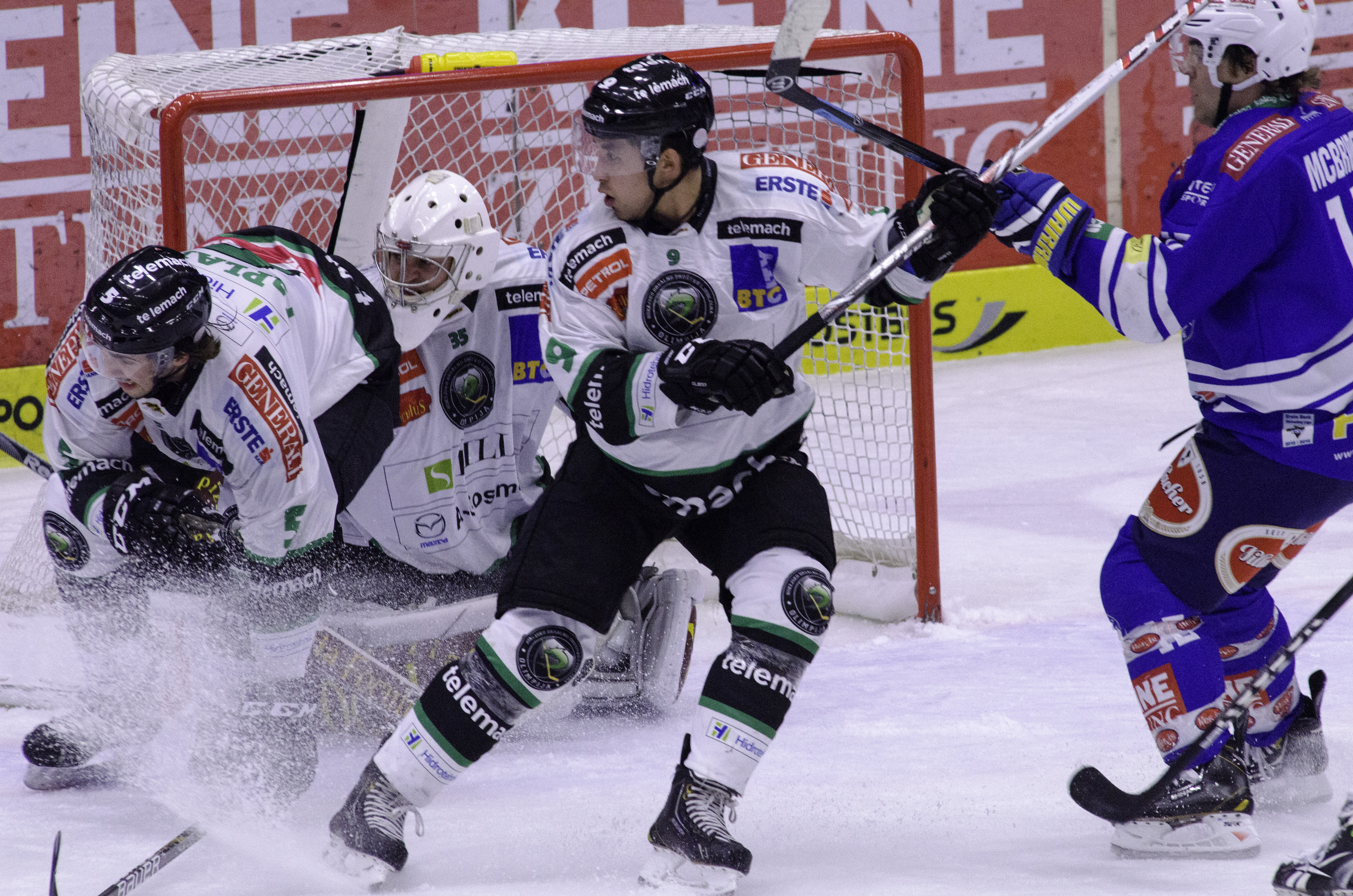
- Born: June 22, 1987 (age 38) Lethbridge, Alberta, Canada
- Height: 6 ft 0 in (183 cm)
- Weight: 192 lb (87 kg; 13 st 10 lb)
- Position: Centre
- Shoots: Left
- DEL2 team Former teams: Heilbronner Falken; Rockford IceHogs; Rochester Americans; Abbotsford Heat; HDD Olimpija Ljubljana; Fehérvár AV19; HK Nitra; SC Csíkszereda
- NHL draft: Undrafted
- Playing career: 2008–present

Judd Blackwater (born June 22, 1987) is a Canadian professional ice hockey player. He is currently playing for Corona Brasov of the National Romanian Championship and Erste Liga.

== Playing career ==
Prior to turning professional, Blackwater played major junior hockey in the Western Hockey League, winning the 2008 Memorial Cup as a member of the Spokane Chiefs. He has played in the American Hockey League with the Rockford IceHogs, Rochester Americans and the Abbotsford Heat.

On August 27, 2013, Blackwater agreed to his first European contract, signing a one-year deal with Slovenian club, HDD Olimpija Ljubljana of the Austrian Hockey League.

In the following 2014–15 season, Blackwater returned to the North American minor leagues in signing a one-year contract with the Ontario Reign of the ECHL on October 3, 2014.

On June 22, 2015, Blackwater returned to the EBEL, signing a one-year contract with Hungarian club, Alba Volán Székesfehérvár of the EBEL. Since 2023 he is part of Corona Brasov, the Romanian National Champions.

== Awards and honours ==
Award	Year
Memorial Cup with the Spokane Chiefs	2008
ECHL All-Star Game	2010
Slovak Extraliga
Champion	2016
