= Pete MacArthur =

American ice hockey player (born 1985)

- Born: June 20, 1985 (age 41) Clifton Park, New York, U.S.
- Height: 5 ft 10 in (178 cm)
- Weight: 180 lb (82 kg; 12 st 12 lb)
- Position: Forward
- Shot: Left
- Played for: Bridgeport Sound Tigers; Rockford IceHogs; San Antonio Rampage; Peoria Rivermen; Lake Erie Monsters; Augsburger Panther; Vienna Capitals; Graz 99ers HC Pustertal Wölfe
- NHL draft: Undrafted
- Playing career: 2008–2022

Peter MacArthur (born June 20, 1985) is an American former professional ice hockey player and former head coach of the Adirondack Thunder of the ECHL.

== Playing career ==
On July 9, 2009, he was signed as a free agent to a one-year contract by the Chicago Blackhawks. After signing with the Las Vegas Wranglers of the ECHL for the 2011–12, MacArthur enjoyed a successful stint with the Lake Erie Monsters of the AHL, before returning to lead the Wranglers to the Kelly Cup finals.

On July 13, 2012, MacArthur signed his first European contract, on a one-year deal with Augsburger Panther of the German Deutsche Eishockey Liga. During the 2012–13 season, MacArthur established himself on the Panthers top scoring line. He finished second on the club with 34 points in 52 games to be rewarded with a one-year contract extension on March 23, 2013.

On August 6, 2014, MacArthur secured a try-out contract with the Vienna Capitals of the Austrian Hockey League. After establishing a role with the Capitals for the season, MacArthur signed a one-year contract to remain in Austria with the Graz 99ers on June 17, 2015.

In the 2015–16 season, MacArthur played in 26 games with the 99ers but was unable to adapt in Graz before he opted to return to North America, signing with the Adirondack Thunder on December 19, 2015. He quickly returned to his scoring ways and was later named team Captain in finishing with 36 points in 46 games.

After two seasons with the Thunder, MacArthur left as a free agent in order to sign with the Allen Americans of the ECHL on September 30, 2017. In the 2017–18 season, MacArthur appeared in 22 games with the Americans, posting 13 points before his year was cut short due to injury.

As a free agent MacArthur signed a one-year contract to return to his previous team, the Adirondack Thunder, on July 9, 2018. Following the conclusion of the 2018–19 season, MacArthur initially ended his 11-year professional career.

On November 20, 2019, MacArthur returned to the professional circuit, agreeing to a contract for the remainder of the season with Italian club, HC Pustertal Wölfe of the Alps Hockey League. He made 17 appearances with the club, posting 15 points in the Alps Hockey League, and 3 points through 6 Italian league games.

On July 8, 2020, MacArthur opted to return to North America and extend his career in the ECHL, agreeing to a contract with the Orlando Solar Bears. He was later released from his contract without playing for the team. MacArthur sat out the 2020–21 season as a free agent, before opting to re-join the Adirondack Thunder in his return to the ECHL on July 9, 2021.

On June 21, 2022, after ending his professional playing career with the Adirondack Thunder, MacArthur was announced as the team's new head coach.

== Personal life ==
MacArthur is married to Cristina Blackwell, former host of Great Day SA on KENS5, and former weather reporter for Despierta America, Univision Network.

== Career statistics ==
			Regular season					Playoffs
Season	Team	League	GP	G	A	Pts	PIM	GP	G	A	Pts	PIM
2003–04	Waterloo Black Hawks	USHL	52	18	24	42	33	12	2	10	12	32
2004–05	Boston University	HE	40	13	14	27	32	—	—	—	—	—
2005–06	Boston University	HE	40	14	25	39	38	—	—	—	—	—
2006–07	Boston University	HE	39	16	20	36	26	—	—	—	—	—
2007–08	Boston University	HE	40	21	24	45	24	—	—	—	—	—
2007–08	Bridgeport Sound Tigers	AHL	9	0	1	1	6	—	—	—	—	—
2008–09	Fresno Falcons	ECHL	3	2	2	4	2	—	—	—	—	—
2008–09	Rockford IceHogs	AHL	64	14	11	25	27	4	0	0	0	0
2009–10	Rockford IceHogs	AHL	71	8	34	42	33	3	0	1	1	0
2010–11	San Antonio Rampage	AHL	21	3	1	4	15	—	—	—	—	—
2011–12	Las Vegas Wranglers	ECHL	38	16	32	48	24	15	6	5	11	18
2011–12	Peoria Rivermen	AHL	1	0	0	0	0	—	—	—	—	—
2011–12	Lake Erie Monsters	AHL	24	4	10	14	10	—	—	—	—	—
2012–13	Augsburger Panther	DEL	52	10	24	34	38	2	0	0	0	2
2013–14	Augsburger Panther	DEL	35	1	13	14	28	—	—	—	—	—
2014–15	Vienna Capitals	EBEL	52	10	16	26	36	13	6	4	10	10
2015–16	Graz 99ers	EBEL	26	2	5	7	26	—	—	—	—	—
2015–16	Adirondack Thunder	ECHL	46	8	28	36	25	12	3	7	10	6
2016–17	Adirondack Thunder	ECHL	63	24	39	63	24	6	1	1	2	0
2017–18	Allen Americans	ECHL	22	5	8	13	12	—	—	—	—	—
2018–19	Adirondack Thunder	ECHL	55	13	32	45	36	5	0	4	4	2
2019–20	HC Pustertal Wölfe	AlpsHL	17	3	12	15	10	—	—	—	—	—
2021–22	Adirondack Thunder	ECHL	38	8	23	31	14	—	—	—	—	—
2022	Team Mullen	3ICE	21	8	17	25	—	—	—	—	—	—
AHL totals			190	29	57	86	91	7	0	1	1	0
ECHL totals			265	76	164	240	137	38	10	26	27	26

== Awards and honors ==
Award	Year
College
All-Hockey East Rookie Team	2004–05
All-Hockey East Second Team	2005–06
All-Hockey East Second Team	2006–07
All-Hockey East First Team	2007–08
AHCA East Second-Team All-American	2007-08
