= Marty Flichel =

Canadian ice hockey player (born 1976)

- Born: March 6, 1976 (age 50) Hodgeville, Saskatchewan, Canada
- Height: 5 ft 11 in (180 cm)
- Weight: 194 lb (88 kg; 13 st 12 lb)
- Position: Right wing
- Shot: Right
- ECHL team: Idaho Steelheads
- NHL draft: 228th overall, 1994; Dallas Stars
- Playing career: 1996–2012

Marty Flichel (born March 6, 1976) is a Canadian retired professional ice hockey player best known as a player for the Idaho Steelheads in the ECHL. He was selected by the Dallas Stars in the 7th round (228th overall) of the 1994 NHL entry draft.

Flichel retired in 2012 as Idaho's all-time leader in games, goals, assists and points. The team retired his number in January 2015.

== Career statistics ==
			Regular season					Playoffs
Season	Team	League	GP	G	A	Pts	PIM	GP	G	A	Pts	PIM
1992–93	Tacoma Rockets	WHL	61	21	20	41	19	7	0	0	0	8
1993–94	Tacoma Rockets	WHL	72	27	48	75	69	8	1	4	5	13
1994–95	Tacoma Rockets	WHL	67	25	53	78	81	4	2	3	5	8
1995–96	Kelowna Rockets	WHL	69	28	79	107	107	6	1	6	7	10
1996–97	Dayton Bombers	ECHL	28	17	16	33	24	2	0	1	1	4
1996–97	Michigan K-Wings	IHL	19	2	3	5	10	—	—	—	—	—
1997–98	Michigan K-Wings	IHL	74	18	16	34	56	4	0	0	0	23
1998–99	Michigan K-Wings	IHL	70	15	28	43	57	1	0	0	0	0
1999–00	Nottingham Panthers	BISL	38	17	23	40	82	5	1	0	1	8
2000–01	Manchester Storm	BISL	47	18	24	42	51	6	4	7	11	6
2001–02	Tacoma Sabercats	WCHL	66	34	36	70	66	10	3	7	10	0
2002–03	Idaho Steelheads	WCHL	61	32	35	67	42	6	2	3	5	10
2003–04	Kalamazoo Wings	UHL	64	21	40	61	62	5	0	3	3	8
2004–05	Idaho Steelheads	ECHL	20	5	10	15	14	—	—	—	—	—
2005–06	Idaho Steelheads	ECHL	72	28	40	68	77	7	2	3	5	21
2006–07	Idaho Steelheads	ECHL	70	39	48	87	95	22	9	13	22	41
2007–08	Idaho Steelheads	ECHL	64	19	48	67	62	4	0	0	0	4
2008–09	Idaho Steelheads	ECHL	60	17	35	52	77	4	0	0	0	0
2009–10	Idaho Steelheads	ECHL	65	14	40	54	50	15	6	11	17	24
2010–11	Idaho Steelheads	ECHL	58	20	25	45	48	7	2	2	4	10
2011–12	Idaho Steelheads	ECHL	27	6	14	20	23	10	2	5	7	10
2013–14	Sun Valley Suns	Independent	10	6	14	20	6	—	—	—	—	—
2014–15	Sun Valley Suns	BDHL	6	5	5	10	0	—	—	—	—	—
2015–16	Sun Valley Suns	BDHL	6	1	6	7	8	—	—	—	—	—
ECHL totals			464	165	276	441	470	71	21	35	56	114
IHL totals			163	35	47	82	123	5	0	0	0	23

== Awards and honours ==
Award	Year
ECHL First All-Star Team	2006–07
