= Chris Barton (ice hockey) =

Canadian ice hockey player

- Born: July 12, 1987 (age 38) Calgary, Alberta, Canada
- Height: 5 ft 11 in (180 cm)
- Weight: 181 lb (82 kg; 12 st 13 lb)
- Position: Forward
- Shot: Left
- Played for: AHL; Bridgeport Sound Tigers; WBS Penguins; ECHL; Wheeling Nailers
- NHL draft: Undrafted
- Playing career: 2011–2013

Chris Barton (born July 12, 1987) is a Canadian former professional ice hockey forward.

== Playing career ==
Barton played two season with the Camrose Kodiaks in 2005–06 and 2006–07. He then played four years at Merrimack College. On March 30, 2011, Barton signed an amateur tryout contract with the American Hockey League's Bridgeport Sound Tigers.

During the 2011–12 season, he played with the ECHL's Wheeling Nailers and the American Hockey League's Wilkes-Barre/Scranton Penguins. For the month of November 2011, Barton was named ECHL Rookie of the month. Barton was also named to the 2011–12 ECHL All-Rookie Team. Barton re-signed with Wheeling on September 28, 2012. On March 17, 2013, Barton scored the 5,000th goal in Wheeling Nailers history.

== Career statistics ==
			Regular season					Playoffs
Season	Team	League	GP	G	A	Pts	PIM	GP	G	A	Pts	PIM
2005–06	Camrose Kodiaks	AJHL	58	18	25	43	25	—	—	—	—	—
2006–07	Camrose Kodiaks	AJHL	58	23	38	61	37	14	5	6	11	12
2007–08	Merrimack Warriors	HE	34	6	13	19	6	—	—	—	—	—
2008–09	Merrimack Warriors	HE	34	9	14	23	14	—	—	—	—	—
2009–10	Merrimack Warriors	HE	37	19	19	38	10	—	—	—	—	—
2010–11	Merrimack Warriors	HE	36	14	25	39	16	—	—	—	—	—
2010–11	Bridgeport Sound Tigers	AHL	1	0	0	0	0	—	—	—	—	—
2011–12	Wheeling Nailers	ECHL	69	29	31	60	40	4	4	0	4	6
2011–12	Wilkes-Barre/Scranton Penguins	AHL	5	0	0	0	0	—	—	—	—	—
2012–13	Wheeling Nailers	ECHL	47	23	20	43	23	—	—	—	—	—
2012–13	Wilkes-Barre/Scranton Penguins	AHL	4	0	0	0	6	—	—	—	—	—
AHL totals			10	0	0	0	6	—	—	—	—	—

== Personal ==
When Barton attended Merrimack College, he majored in Management. Barton says he had a hockey stick in his hand when he was about 4 years old.

Preceded by Scott Freeman	ECHL Rookie of the Month; November 2011	Succeeded by Anthony Luciani
