= Eric Lampe =

American ice hockey player

- Born: March 31, 1986 (age 39) Madison, Wisconsin, USA
- Height: 5 ft 11 in (180 cm)
- Weight: 172 lb (78 kg; 12 st 4 lb)
- Position: Forward
- Shot: Left
- Played for: Syracuse Crunch; Lake Erie Monsters; Hamilton Bulldogs; Norfolk Admirals; Oji Eagles; HC Neumarkt-Egna; Eispiraten Crimmitschau
- NHL draft: Undrafted
- Playing career: 2010–2016

Eric Lampe (born March 31, 1986) is an American former professional ice hockey player. He last played for Eispiraten Crimmitschau in the DEL2.

== Playing career ==
Prior to turning professional, Lampe attended Quinnipiac University where he played four seasons of NCAA Division I college hockey with the Quinnipiac Bobcats men's ice hockey team.

After two seasons as an ECHL All-Star with the Las Vegas Wranglers, Lampe signed a one-year contract abroad with Oji Eagles of the Asia League Ice Hockey on August 9, 2013. In the 2013–14 season, Lampe established an elite partnership with North American teammate, and former Lake Erie Monster, Mike Kompon, to score 51 points in only 42 games.

On August 12, 2014, Lampe left Japan and signed a one-year contract with first division Italian club, HC Neumarkt-Egna. After just 14 games in the Italian league, Lampe left to sign in the German DEL2 league with ETC Crimmitschau.

== Career statistics ==
			Regular season					Playoffs
Season	Team	League	GP	G	A	Pts	PIM	GP	G	A	Pts	PIM
2003–04	Chicago Steel	USHL	58	9	5	14	48	5	0	0	0	6
2004–05	Chicago Steel	USHL	56	8	11	19	85	8	2	1	3	10
2005–06	Chicago Steel	USHL	52	14	26	40	99	—	—	—	—	—
2006–07	Quinnipiac University	ECAC	40	8	11	19	58	—	—	—	—	—
2007–08	Quinnipiac University	ECAC	36	12	8	20	62	—	—	—	—	—
2008–09	Quinnipiac University	ECAC	34	14	12	26	73	—	—	—	—	—
2009–10	Quinnipiac University	ECAC	40	13	24	37	78	—	—	—	—	—
2009–10	Florida Everblades	ECHL	1	0	1	1	0	5	3	0	3	0
2010–11	Elmira Jackals	ECHL	38	17	17	34	12	2	2	1	3	2
2010–11	Syracuse Crunch	AHL	24	2	2	4	16	—	—	—	—	—
2011–12	Las Vegas Wranglers	ECHL	52	37	30	67	38	17	7	14	21	30
2011–12	Lake Erie Monsters	AHL	3	0	1	1	0	—	—	—	—	—
2011–12	Hamilton Bulldogs	AHL	13	2	0	2	2	—	—	—	—	—
2012–13	Las Vegas Wranglers	ECHL	57	26	23	49	56	7	0	2	2	8
2012–13	Norfolk Admirals	AHL	6	0	1	1	6	—	—	—	—	—
2013–14	Oji Eagles	AL	42	20	31	51	66	7	3	5	8	6
2014–15	HC Neumarkt-Egna	ITL	14	4	9	13	26	—	—	—	—	—
2014–15	Eispiraten Crimmitschau	DEL2	25	12	23	35	57	—	—	—	—	—
2015–16	Eispiraten Crimmitschau	DEL2	48	19	43	62	98	3	2	1	3	6
AHL totals			46	4	4	8	24	—	—	—	—	—

== Awards and honors ==
Award	Year
ECHL
All-Star Game	2011
All-Star Fastest Skater	2011
