= Brayden Irwin =

Canadian ice hockey player

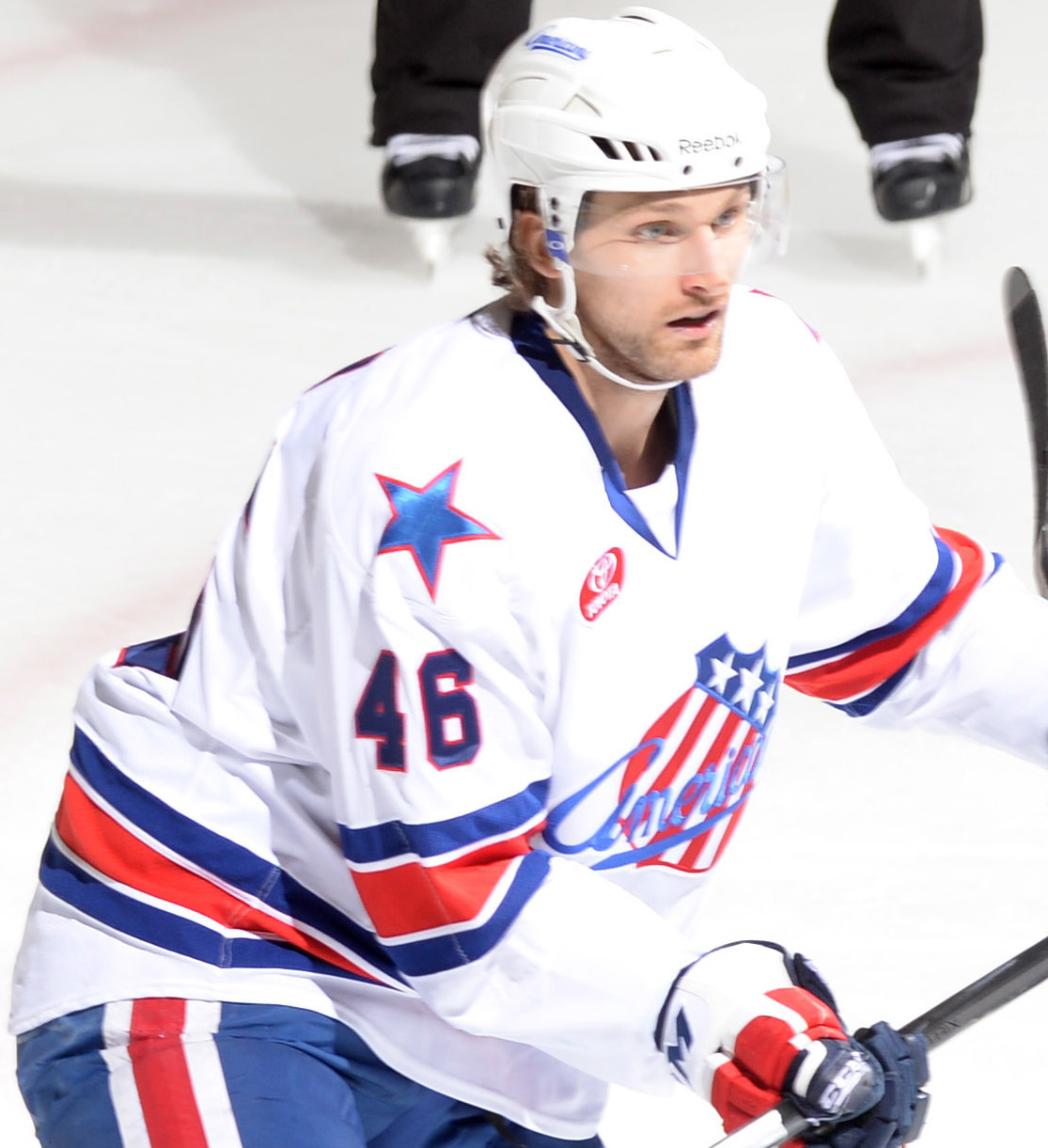
- Irwin with the Rochester Americans in 2014
- Born: March 24, 1987 (age 39) Toronto, Ontario, Canada
- Height: 6 ft 5 in (196 cm)
- Weight: 215 lb (98 kg; 15 st 5 lb)
- Position: Centre
- Shot: Right
- Played for: Toronto Maple Leafs
- NHL draft: Undrafted
- Playing career: 2010–2015

Brayden Irwin (born March 24, 1987) is a Canadian former professional ice hockey centre who played 2 games for the Toronto Maple Leafs in the National Hockey League (NHL).

== Playing career ==
Irwin grew up in Toronto, Ontario playing minor hockey for the AA North Toronto program in the Yonge-Eglinton area of the city. He went to high school at Upper Canada College in Toronto, a member of Bremner's house. Irwin's family were the founders of the Irwin Toy Corporation. Irwin was selected in the 2003 OHL Draft out of AA hockey by the Brampton Battalion. He chose to pursue an NCAA scholarship and eventually signed with the St. Michael's Buzzers Jr.A. club of the OHA.

He played hockey at the University of Vermont and in his senior year Irwin led Vermont in scoring during the 2009–10 season. Upon completion of his four-year collegiate career Irwin signed with the Toronto Maple Leafs on March 29, 2010. With the Leafs out of playoff contention, Irwin immediately made his NHL debut at the end of the 2009–10 season on April 1, 2010.

In the final year of his entry-level contract with the Leafs, due to injury and lack of form Irwin was reassigned to ECHL affiliate the Reading Royals by the Toronto Maple Leafs on November 11, 2011. After one game with the Royals, Irwin was then loaned to ECHL rival the Florida Everblades for the remainder of the season, where he became instrumental in helping capture the Kelly Cup.

On September 5, 2012, he was re-signed to a one-year ECHL contract with the Everblades.

== Career statistics ==
=== Regular season and playoffs ===
			Regular season					Playoffs
Season	Team	League	GP	G	A	Pts	PIM	GP	G	A	Pts	PIM
2004–05	Cowichan Valley Capitals	BCHL	2	0	1	1	0	—	—	—	—	—
2004–05	St. Michael's Buzzers	OPJHL	49	13	15	28	40	—	—	—	—	—
2005–06	St. Michael's Buzzers	OPJHL	21	8	12	20	44	20	11	10	21	22
2006–07	University of Vermont	HE	33	7	12	19	14	—	—	—	—	—
2007–08	University of Vermont	HE	39	10	8	18	48	—	—	—	—	—
2008–09	University of Vermont	HE	33	6	5	11	60	—	—	—	—	—
2009–10	University of Vermont	HE	39	15	19	34	72	—	—	—	—	—
2009–10	Toronto Maple Leafs	NHL	2	0	0	0	2	—	—	—	—	—
2010–11	Toronto Marlies	AHL	45	7	8	15	37	—	—	—	—	—
2011–12	Toronto Marlies	AHL	1	0	0	0	0	—	—	—	—	—
2011–12	Reading Royals	ECHL	1	0	0	0	0	—	—	—	—	—
2011–12	Florida Everblades	ECHL	36	17	14	31	60	17	6	7	13	10
2012–13	Florida Everblades	ECHL	38	14	15	29	18	3	0	2	2	2
2012–13	Norfolk Admirals	AHL	20	1	3	4	20	—	—	—	—	—
2013–14	Stockton Thunder	ECHL	15	8	5	13	16	—	—	—	—	—
2013–14	Utica Comets	AHL	5	0	0	0	0	—	—	—	—	—
2013–14	Greenville Road Warriors	ECHL	6	3	10	13	2	—	—	—	—	—
2013–14	Rochester Americans	AHL	45	7	18	25	21	5	3	0	3	10
2014–15	Elmira Jackals	ECHL	10	6	8	14	10	—	—	—	—	—
2014–15	Rochester Americans	AHL	49	14	11	25	22	—	—	—	—	—
2018–19	Das Preds	DMHL	6	3	6	9	0	1	1	2	3	0
NHL totals			2	0	0	0	2	—	—	—	—	—

== Awards and honours ==
Award	Year
College
All-Hockey East Rookie Team	2007
ECHL
Kelly Cup (Florida Everblades)	2012
