= Trent Daavettila =

American ice hockey player (born 1984)

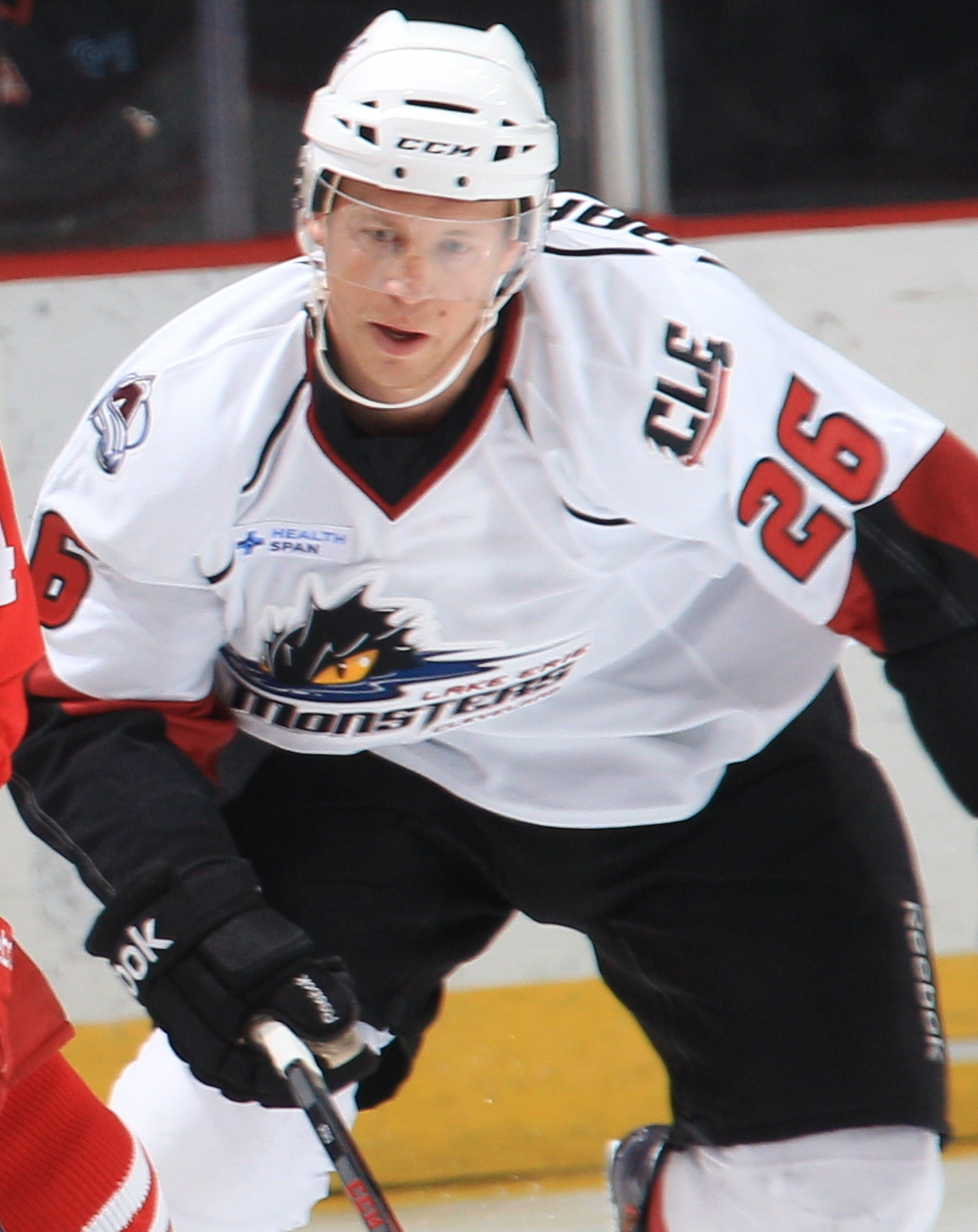
- Daavettila with the Lake Erie Monsters in 2014
- Born: September 3, 1984 (age 41) Howell, Michigan, US
- Height: 6 ft 0 in (183 cm)
- Weight: 190 lb (86 kg; 13 st 8 lb)
- Position: Forward
- Shot: Left
- Played for: Adirondack Phantoms; Grand Rapids Griffins; St. John's IceCaps; Chicago Wolves; Lake Erie Monsters
- NHL draft: Undrafted
- Playing career: 2008–2016

Trent Daavettila (born September 3, 1984) is an American former professional ice hockey player who last played for and served as Captain for the Colorado Eagles of the ECHL. After beginning his college hockey career with Finlandia University, he transferred to Michigan Technological University, but failed to gain a place on their team. He remained at Michigan Tech and played for an upper-level men's amateur team while earning a civil engineering degree. Daavettila tried out for numerous minor league hockey teams after graduating from college, but was not accepted by any. Months later, however, he was signed to a professional tryout contract by the Kalamazoo Wings. Daavettila remained with the team, and two seasons later he tied for the team scoring lead and was named a second-team all-star by the ECHL. Through the 2012–13 season, he has also played in 19 American Hockey League games.

== Early life ==
Daavettila was born on September 3, 1984. He grew up in Howell, Michigan, as the second oldest in a family of eleven children. His first exposure to ice hockey was in his backyard, where his family had constructed a rink. Through crowded pickup games, Daavettila learned to stickhandle. "You'd always want to stickhandle your way down. It was never cool to score from far out", he said.

== Playing career ==
Daavettila graduated from Howell High School in 2002 and enrolled at Finlandia University in Hancock, Michigan. He played in ten games for Finlandia's varsity hockey team, a member of the Midwest Collegiate Hockey Association in Division III of the National Collegiate Athletic Association, and scored three goals and ten assists before moving on. Daavettila transferred to Michigan Technological University, just across Portage Lake from Finlandia, and attempted to join the Division I Michigan Tech Huskies hockey team as a walk-on, but failed to do so. He continued to study civil engineering at Michigan Tech while playing for the Portage Lake Pioneers, a high-level men's amateur team playing in the Great Lakes Hockey League. During his five years with the Pioneers, Daavettila scored at a rate of more than a point per game and in 2005 he won a national championship with them.

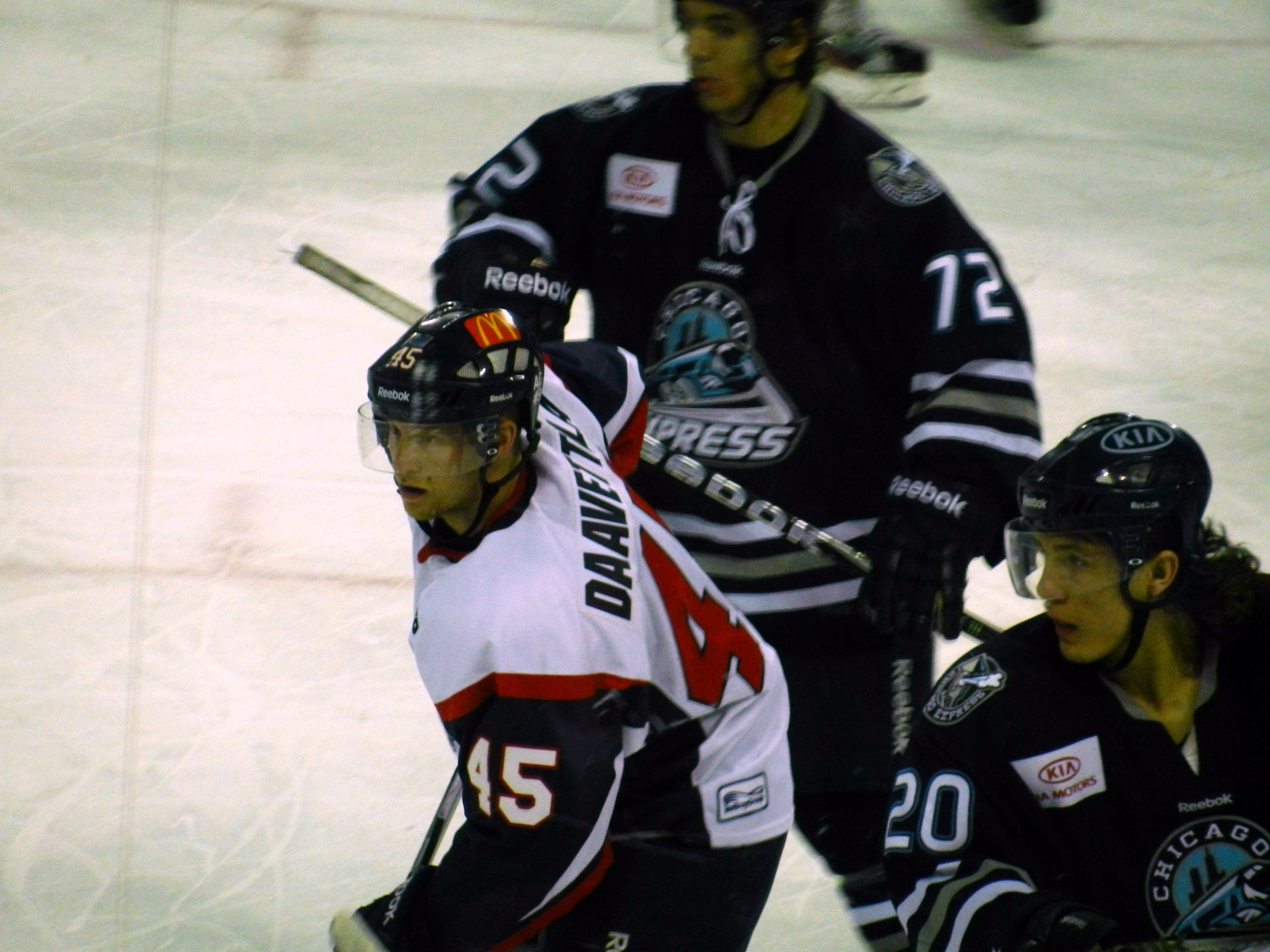
Daavettila playing for Kalamazoo in a game against the Chicago Express in 2012

Daavettila graduated from Michigan Tech in 2008 and tried out for the Flint Generals of the International Hockey League (IHL). He appeared in two games for the Generals at the end of the season (for only about three shifts), and did not register a point. Daavettila had not originally planned to pursue a professional hockey career, but said "When I got one skate with Flint, it kind of sparked my interest and I decided to give it a try". During the off-season, Daavettila worked for a structural engineering firm in Saginaw, Michigan. He used vacation time at the start of the next hockey season later in 2008 to try out for the Grand Rapids Griffins of the American Hockey League (AHL) and the Muskegon Lumberjacks (IHL), though he was rejected by both teams. Tryouts with two more IHL teams, the Kalamazoo Wings and the Bloomington PrairieThunder, did not result in a contract either. Daavettila assumed his hockey career was over and went back to his engineering job, but he continued to skate a couple times a week. He had left an impression on Kalamazoo coach Nick Bootland, however, who called Daavettila back in March 2009 after his team was depleted by injuries. "You could see he had a skill set," said Bootland. "But I thought the way he held on to the puck, he was going to get himself killed. ... You kept thinking he was going to make a mistake. Then he'd pop a guy for a breakaway."

Bootland played Daavettila for two shifts in his first game with the Wings and more in his second game. Daavettila responded with his first professional hockey goal and went on to score 9 goals and 9 assists in 20 games for the Wings that season. During the off-season, the New York Rangers of the NHL invited Daavettila to participate in a development camp for their recent draftees and other prospects. "It was the hardest I've ever had to push myself as far as conditioning and the longevity of it", said Daavettila. Also during the off-season, the Kalamazoo Wings left the IHL to become members of the ECHL, and Daavettila was one of the first players the team signed to play in their new league. "It was a weird feeling knowing you had a ... plan for next year, somebody actually wants you", he said.

Daavettila scored 8 goals among 14 points in the Wings' first 14 games of the 2009–10 ECHL season, helping the team to achieve the best record of the league's 25 teams at that point. His performance prompted the Adirondack Phantoms (AHL) to sign Daavettila to a professional tryout contract when the team was beset by injuries early in the season. Daavettila played eleven games for the Phantoms, as center of the third and fourth lines, and collected two assists before being sent back to Kalamazoo. Shortly thereafter, he was signed to another professional tryout by the Grand Rapids Griffins, for whom he played in two games and scored his first AHL goal by deflecting a shot by Andy Delmore. Daavettila was later called up again and played in two more games for Adirondack. Meanwhile, while with Kalamazoo, he scored 19 goals and added 30 assists in 51 games to finish fourth on the team in scoring. In the playoffs, Daavettila continued his point-per-game scoring rate, but the Wings lost their first-round series to the Reading Royals. In July, he was one of the first players signed by the Wings for the following season.

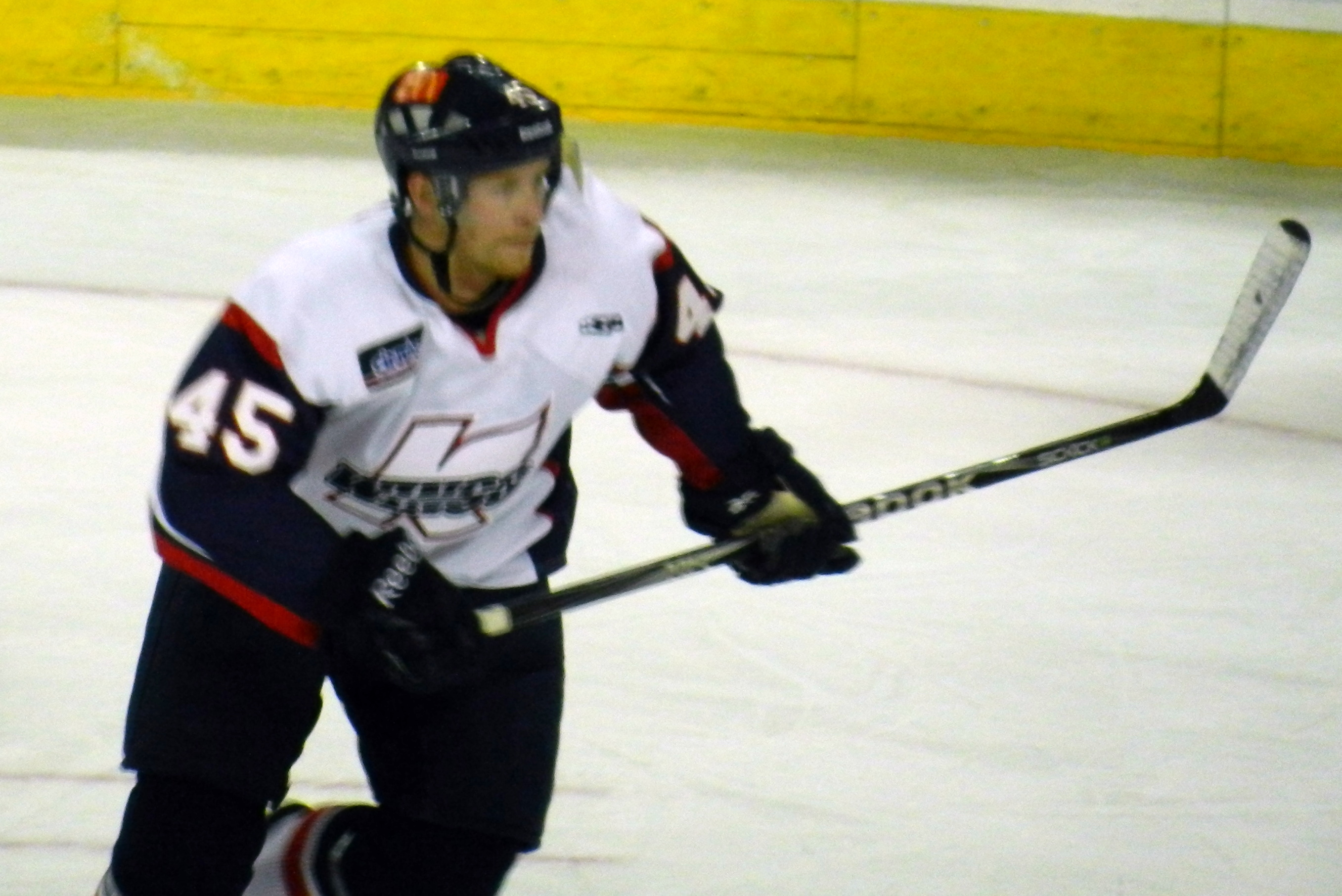
Daavettila playing for Kalamazoo

Daavettila began the 2010–11 season at the Grand Rapids Griffins training camp, but again did not make the team. Back with the Wings, he centered a line with Brady Leisenring and Andrew Fournier and had a 12-game point-scoring streak early in the season. In early January, Daavettila was loaned to the Griffins, where he played in one game before being returned. He was named ECHL Player of the Week for the week ending on February 13 after scoring five goals and two assists in four games, including his first professional hat trick on February 12 against the Greenville Road Warriors. He was on a seven-game point streak at the end of the month and was named ECHL Plus Performer of the Month for having the best plus-minus in February and ECHL Player of the Month for scoring 8 goals and 14 assists in his team's 14 games. Now on a line with Fournier and Darryl Lloyd, Daavettila extended his point streak to eleven games and helped Kalamazoo gain a place in the playoffs in March. He finished the season with 80 points to tie with Kory Karlander as Kalamazoo's lead scorers; the pair tied for fourth in league scoring. Daavettila was also named an ECHL second-team all-star and shared the ECHL Reebok Plus Performer Award with Brendan Connolly of the Greenville Road Warriors. In the playoffs, Daavettila scored 6 goals and 22 assists in 18 games, leading the league in playoff scoring, and helped the Wings defeat the Florida Everblades, Reading Royals and Wheeling Nailers on their way to the Kelly Cup Finals. In that series, Kalamazoo lost to the Alaska Aces 4–1.

After completing his fourth season with the Wings in 2011–12, Daavettila signed his first European contract as a free agent, agreeing to a one-year deal with Frederikshavn White Hawks of the Danish AL-Bank Ligaen on June 13, 2012. However a little over a month later, for personal reasons, Daavettila sought a release from his contract and was granted on July 30, 2012. On September 13, Daavettila agreed to remain in the ECHL, defecting from the Wings to fellow competitor the Colorado Eagles on a one-year deal.

Through four seasons with the Colorado Eagles, Daavettila continued to perform among the ECHL's top offensive producers, recording 282 points in 260 regular season games. Despite placing second in league scoring with 80 points through the 2015–16 season, Daavettila opted to end his professional career and return to his hometown Howell, Michigan to raise his family.

== Personal life ==
He is of Finnish American descent. Daavettila married his wife Wendy on August 7, 2010. During the 2009 and 2010 off-seasons, he worked for Tetra Tech in Howell, Michigan. He works for RS&H, INC. in Novi, Michigan.

== Career statistics ==
			Regular season					Playoffs
Season	Team	League	GP	G	A	Pts	PIM	GP	G	A	Pts	PIM
2002–03	Finlandia University	MCHA	10	3	10	13	0	—	—	—	—	—
2005–06	Portage Lake Pioneers	GLHL	14	10	20	30	2	—	—	—	—	—
2006–07	Portage Lake Pioneers	GLHL	20	25	15	40	12	—	—	—	—	—
2007–08	Portage Lake Pioneers	GLHL	11	18	11	29	4	2	2	0	2	2
2007–08	Flint Generals	IHL	2	0	0	0	0	—	—	—	—	—
2008–09	Kalamazoo Wings	IHL	20	9	9	18	6	6	1	1	2	0
2009–10	Kalamazoo Wings	ECHL	51	19	30	49	24	5	3	2	5	0
2009–10	Adirondack Phantoms	AHL	13	0	2	2	2	—	—	—	—	—
2009–10	Grand Rapids Griffins	AHL	2	1	0	1	0	—	—	—	—	—
2010–11	Kalamazoo Wings	ECHL	71	32	48	80	24	18	6	22	28	8
2010–11	Grand Rapids Griffins	AHL	1	0	0	0	0	—	—	—	—	—
2011–12	Kalamazoo Wings	ECHL	69	18	56	74	40	14	3	10	13	2
2011–12	St. John's IceCaps	AHL	2	0	0	0	2	—	—	—	—	—
2012–13	Colorado Eagles	ECHL	70	19	48	67	30	6	4	6	10	2
2012–13	Chicago Wolves	AHL	1	0	1	1	0	—	—	—	—	—
2013–14	Colorado Eagles	ECHL	63	22	44	66	36	6	1	4	5	8
2013–14	Lake Erie Monsters	AHL	3	1	2	3	0	—	—	—	—	—
2014–15	Colorado Eagles	ECHL	56	16	53	69	20	7	3	4	7	4
2015–16	Colorado Eagles	ECHL	71	25	55	80	26	6	4	1	5	4
ECHL totals			451	151	334	485	200	62	24	49	73	28
AHL totals			22	2	5	7	2	—	—	—	—	—

Statistics as of the end of the 2015–16 season.
