= Kory Falite =

American ice hockey player

- Born: July 18, 1986 (age 39) Billerica, MA, USA
- Height: 5 ft 10 in (178 cm)
- Weight: 174 lb (79 kg; 12 st 6 lb)
- Position: Forward
- Shot: Left
- Played for: Alaska Aces; Florida Everblades; Utah Grizzlies; San Francisco Bulls
- NHL draft: Undrafted
- Playing career: 2010–2014

Kory Falite (born July 18, 1986) is a retired American professional ice hockey player. He was formerly the director of hockey operations for the Hong Kong Typhoons, and former coach of the Hong Kong Selects programs.

Falite attended the University of Massachusetts Lowell where he played four seasons (2006–2010) of NCAA college hockey with the UMass Lowell River Hawks, scoring 60 goals and 46 assists for 106 points, while registering 90 penalty minutes in 141 games played.

After graduating Falite signed with the St. Louis Blues and was assigned to Alaska Aces of the ECHL. He played 69 games during the regular season compiling 45 points in his rookie season. He also played in 9 playoff games helping the Aces win both the ECHL regular season and the Kelly Cup playoffs.

Falite played the part of the 2011–12 season with Norway's Manglerud Star Ishockey, but returned to North America to pursue his professional career after signing a contract on December 11, 2011, with the Florida Everblades of the ECHL.

He was then sent to the Utah Grizzlies to finish the remainder of the 2012 season. Falite played over 90 games with Utah until he was traded at the deadline the following season in a seven-player deal. He was sent to the San Francisco Bulls to finish the 2013 season.

In 2014, Falite joined "World Select" and was sent to Hong Kong to coach the Hong Kong ice hockey team the Hong Kong Selects. Kory and his brother Craig Falite coached this team until 2017.

== Awards and honors ==
Award	Year	Note
All-Hockey East Second Team	2007–08	
