= Darryl Bootland =

Canadian ice hockey player (born 1981)

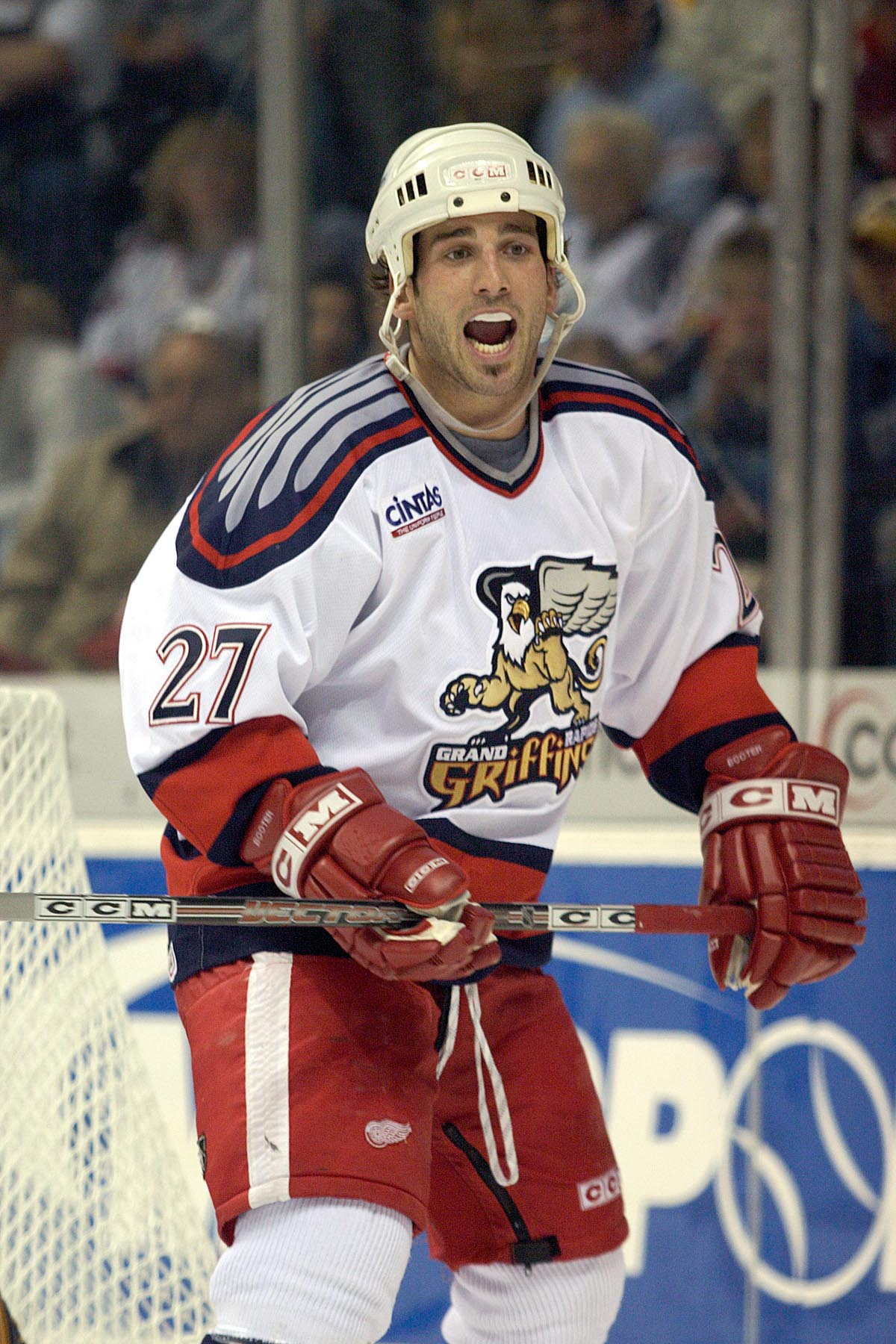
- Bootland with the Grand Rapids Griffins in 2005
- Born: November 2, 1981 (age 44) Schomberg, Ontario, Canada
- Height: 6 ft 2 in (188 cm)
- Weight: 204 lb (93 kg; 14 st 8 lb)
- Position: Right wing
- Shot: Right
- Played for: Detroit Red Wings; New York Islanders; EC Red Bull Salzburg; Vienna Capitals
- NHL draft: 252nd overall, 2000; Colorado Avalanche
- Playing career: 2002–2018

Darryl Bootland (born November 2, 1981) is a Canadian former professional ice hockey right wing who played in the National Hockey League (NHL) with the Detroit Red Wings and New York Islanders.

== Playing career ==
Bootland was drafted 252nd overall in the 2000 NHL entry draft by the Colorado Avalanche from the Toronto St. Michael's Majors of the Ontario Hockey League. After his final year in the OHL, Bootland signed with the Detroit Red Wings as a free agent to a three-year contract on August 29, 2002.

Bootland made his NHL debut with the Red Wings in the 2003–04 season, recording two points (1–1–2) and 74 PIM in 22 games. Bootland spent the next three years with the Red Wings affiliate, the Grand Rapids Griffins of the AHL before getting recalled by the Red Wings on March 5, 2007, playing in six games.

On July 6, 2007, Bootland signed with the New York Islanders. He appeared in four games with the Islanders before he was traded to the Anaheim Ducks in exchange for Matt Keith on January 9, 2008.

On October 7, 2008, Bootland signed a 25 Game Professional Tryout Agreement with the Manitoba Moose of the AHL. On December 15, 2008, Bootland signed with Salzburg EC in Austria.

On September 2, 2009, Bootland signed with the Kalamazoo Wings of the ECHL. Darryl was signed to the K-Wings by his brother Nick, who was (and remains to this day) the K-Wings' director of hockey operations and head coach. While starting the 2009–10 season with the K-Wings, Bootland then signed for a second try-out stint with the Moose. Upon his return to Kalamazoo Bootland left again for Austria, signing with the Vienna Capitals on February 1, 2010.

The following season, Darryl continued his journeyman career, by returning to the Islanders minor-league affiliates in accepting a try-out to the Bridgeport Sound Tigers training camp. On October 1, 2010, he was assigned and signed with the Islanders CHL affiliate, the Odessa Jackalopes for the 2010–11 season.

After returning to the Kalamazoo Wings for the 2011–12 season, Bootland produced his best numbers since 2006, scoring 53 points in 67 contests. A free agent, Bootland opted for a second stint in the CHL, signing a one-year contract with the Allen Americans on July 25, 2012.

After two consecutive Ray Miron Cup championship winning seasons with the Americans, Bootland returned to the ECHL as a free agent to sign a one-year contract with the Colorado Eagles on August 12, 2014.

Bootland added a veteran presence and set the physical tone with the Eagles for three seasons, culminating in capturing their first Kelly Cup in the 2016–17 season.

As a free agent with ambition to prolong his career, Bootland secured a one-year deal with the Orlando Solar Bears of the ECHL on September 21, 2017. In the 2017–18 season, Bootland was hampered through injury and lack of playing time and after just 21 games with Orlando he was released from his contract on March 13, 2018.

== Personal ==
Darryl married Sarah Mauldin on June 23, 2010. They raise three kids together, Trace Riley Gunter January 20, 2006 from a previous relationship, Havyn Bennett Bootland, March 3, 2013 and Loxley Belle Bootland, January 17, 2017.

== Career statistics ==
			Regular season					Playoffs
Season	Team	League	GP	G	A	Pts	PIM	GP	G	A	Pts	PIM
1997–98	Orangeville Crushers	MWJHL	44	22	26	48	177	—	—	—	—	—
1998–99	Barrie Colts	OHL	38	18	11	29	89	—	—	—	—	—
1998–99	Toronto St. Michael's Majors	OHL	28	12	6	18	80	—	—	—	—	—
1999–2000	Toronto St. Michael's Majors	OHL	65	24	30	54	166	—	—	—	—	—
2000–01	Toronto St. Michael's Majors	OHL	56	32	33	65	136	11	3	1	4	20
2001–02	Toronto St. Michael's Majors	OHL	61	41	56	97	137	15	8	10	18	50
2002–03	Toledo Storm	ECHL	54	17	19	36	322	—	—	—	—	—
2002–03	Grand Rapids Griffins	AHL	16	1	4	5	41	15	3	2	5	46
2003–04	Grand Rapids Griffins	AHL	54	12	2	14	175	4	0	1	1	2
2003–04	Detroit Red Wings	NHL	22	1	1	2	74	—	—	—	—	—
2004–05	Grand Rapids Griffins	AHL	78	14	20	34	336	—	—	—	—	—
2005–06	Grand Rapids Griffins	AHL	77	27	29	56	390	16	5	7	12	50
2006–07	Grand Rapids Griffins	AHL	68	18	13	31	222	6	1	0	1	32
2006–07	Detroit Red Wings	NHL	6	0	0	0	9	—	—	—	—	—
2007–08	New York Islanders	NHL	4	0	1	1	2	—	—	—	—	—
2007–08	Bridgeport Sound Tigers	AHL	28	2	8	10	93	—	—	—	—	—
2007–08	Portland Pirates	AHL	35	2	5	7	132	16	1	1	2	21
2008–09	Manitoba Moose	AHL	14	5	4	9	42	—	—	—	—	—
2008–09	EC Red Bull Salzburg	AUT	28	8	14	22	151	—	—	—	—	—
2009–10	Kalamazoo Wings	ECHL	25	10	9	19	90	—	—	—	—	—
2009–10	Manitoba Moose	AHL	12	1	1	2	49	—	—	—	—	—
2009–10	Vienna Capitals	AUT	4	1	2	3	6	12	5	0	5	22
2010–11	Odessa Jackalopes	CHL	56	13	10	23	161	—	—	—	—	—
2011–12	Kalamazoo Wings	ECHL	67	25	28	53	170	14	4	4	8	16
2012–13	Allen Americans	CHL	55	22	29	51	135	18	4	8	12	60
2013–14	Allen Americans	CHL	45	18	16	34	145	17	7	4	11	21
2014–15	Colorado Eagles	ECHL	41	17	10	27	252	6	2	2	4	15
2015–16	Colorado Eagles	ECHL	66	15	27	42	259	6	2	1	3	26
2016–17	Colorado Eagles	ECHL	55	10	12	22	229	18	1	0	1	30
2017–18	Orlando Solar Bears	ECHL	21	3	5	8	95	—	—	—	—	—
AHL totals			382	82	86	168	1480	57	10	11	21	151
NHL totals			32	1	2	3	85	—	—	—	—	—

== Awards and honours ==
Award	Year
OHL
Plus/Minus Award	2002
CHL Plus/Minus Award	2002
CHL
Ray Miron Cup (Allen Americans)	2013, 2014
ECHL
Kelly Cup (Colorado Eagles)	2017
