= Adam Miller (ice hockey) =

American ice hockey player

- Born: November 21, 1984 (age 40) Livonia, Michigan, U.S.
- Height: 6 ft 1 in (185 cm)
- Weight: 201 lb (91 kg; 14 st 5 lb)
- Position: Centre
- Shot: Left
- Metal team Former teams: Frederikshavn White Hawks; Milwaukee Admirals; Ässät; IF Troja/Ljungby; KHL Medveščak Zagreb; Nippon Paper Cranes; Dornbirner EC
- NHL draft: Undrafted
- Playing career: 2008–2019

Adam Miller (born November 21, 1984) is an American former professional ice hockey player.

== Career ==
In 2008, following four years at Ferris State University, the Las Vegas Wranglers of the ECHL signed Miller to an amateur try-out agreement. In the 2008–09 season, Miller played 54 regular-season games and 18 playoff games with the Wranglers, and also skated in 10 games with the Milwaukee Admirals of the American Hockey League (AHL). During 2009–10, he played 77 games with the Wranglers, and won the Reebok fastest skater competition at the 2010 ECHL All-Star Game skills competition.

Miller played the 2010–11 season in the Finnish SM-liiga and Swedish Allsvenskan leagues. He returned to the Wranglers for the following 2011–12 season, before returning to Europe in played with Croatian club, KHL Medveščak Zagreb participating in the Austrian EBEL.

After a single season in the Asia League Ice Hockey with the Nippon Paper Cranes, Miller opted for a second stint in the EBEL, agreeing to terms on a one-year deal with Dornbirner EC on June 19, 2014.
