= Kory Karlander =

Canadian ice hockey player

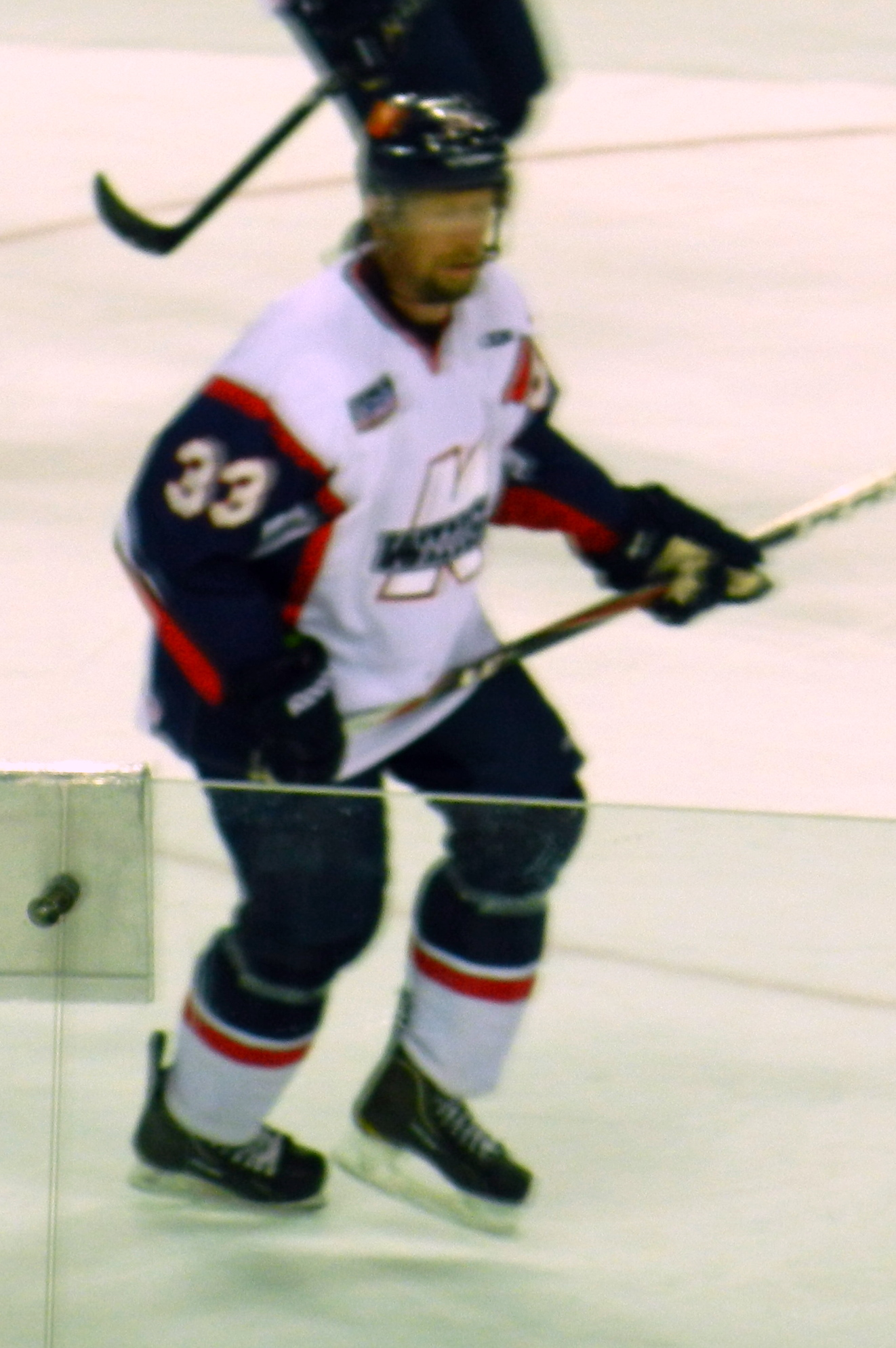
- Born: March 21, 1972 (age 53) Melita, Manitoba, Canada
- Height: 6 ft 1 in (185 cm)
- Weight: 190 lb (86 kg; 13 st 8 lb)
- Position: Centre
- Shot: Left
- Played for: Milwaukee Admirals; Detroit Vipers; Grand Rapids Griffins; Michigan K-Wings; Belfast Giants
- NHL draft: Undrafted
- Playing career: 1995–2013

Kory Karlander (born March 21, 1972) is a Canadian former professional ice hockey player who most notably played for the Kalamazoo Wings in the ECHL.

In his 17th season as a professional hockey player, at the age of 39, Karlander was named to the (2010–11) ECHL First All-Star Team.
