= Josh Lunden =

Canadian ice hockey player

- Born: February 24, 1986 (age 40) Coquitlam, British Columbia, Canada
- Height: 6 ft 2 in (188 cm)
- Weight: 203 lb (92 kg; 14 st 7 lb)
- Position: Left wing
- Shoots: Left
- L.Magnus team Former teams: Ducs d'Angers; San Antonio Rampage; Peoria Rivermen; Houston Aeros; St. John's IceCaps; Rubin Tyumen; ESV Kaufbeuren
- NHL draft: Undrafted
- Playing career: 2010–present

Josh Lunden (born February 24, 1986) is a Canadian professional ice hockey player. He is currently the Head Coach of the Southern Shore Puglisevich Senior Breakers of the AESHL in Newfoundland and Labrador. On March 20, 2010, the Phoenix Coyotes of the National Hockey League signed Lunden to an entry-level contract.

Lunden played two seasons under contract to the St. John's IceCaps of the American Hockey League before signing his first contract abroad with Russian second division club, Rubin Tyumen of the Higher Hockey League on September 16, 2014. Mid-season Lunden transferred from Tyumen to German club, ESV Kaufbeuren in the DEL2.

On July 1, 2015, Lunden signed a one-year contract with French outfit Ducs d'Angers of the Ligue Magnus.

Lunden returned to Newfoundland and Labrador and is currently the Head Coach of the Southern Shore Puglisevich Senior Breakers.
