= Ian O'Connor (ice hockey) =

American ice hockey player (born 1987)

- Born: June 18, 1987 (age 39) Londonderry, New Hampshire, USA
- Height: 6 ft 0 in (183 cm)
- Weight: 203 lb (92 kg; 14 st 7 lb)
- Position: Forward
- Shoots: Left
- AHL team Former teams: Free Agent; Worcester Sharks; Manchester Monarchs; St John's IceCaps
- NHL draft: Undrafted
- Playing career: 2011–present

Ian O'Connor (born June 18, 1987) is an American professional ice hockey player. An unrestricted free agent, he last played for the Manchester Monarchs of the American Hockey League.

== Career ==
On March 18, 2011, the Reading Royals of the ECHL signed O'Connor to an amateur tryout agreement. During the 2012–13 season, O'Connor was loaned by the Royals to the Manchester Monarchs of the American Hockey League.
