= 2010 Central Hockey League All-Star Game =

2010 CHL All-Star Game
	1	2	3	Total
CHL All-Stars	2	0	2	4
South Texas All-Stars	1	3	5	9
- Date: January 13, 2010
- Arena: Laredo Entertainment Center
- City: Laredo, Texas
- MVP: Sean Muncy
- Attendance: 3,984

The 2010 Central Hockey League All-Star Game was held at the Laredo Entertainment Center in Laredo, Texas. The game was between the teams named The South Texas All-Stars and The CHL All-Stars.

== Rosters ==
=== South Texas All-Stars ===
Starters

- Forwards: Darryl Smith • Justin Quenneville • Jesse Bennefield
- Defencemen: Nathan Ansell • Adam Rivet
- Goaltender: J.P. Levasseur

Reserves

- Forwards: Evan Schwabe • Jeff Bes • Jereme Tendler • Sean Muncy • Grant Goeckner-Zoeller • Ryan Garbutt
- Defencemen: Jarred Mohr • Tom Sawatske • Jason Tessier • Kyle Peto
- Goaltenders: Andy Franck • Kevin Nastiuk

=== CHL All-Stars ===
Starters

- Forwards: Riley Nelson • Rob Hisey • Justin Bowers
- Defencemen: Aaron Schneekloth • Alex Dunn
- Goaltender: Joel Martin

Reserves

- Forwards: Les Reaney • Jordan Cameron • Kevin Ulanski • Dominic Leveille • Bruce Graham • Jeff Christian
- Defencemen: Andrew Smale • Derek Landmesser • Jon Landry • Jim Jorgensen
- Goaltenders: Danny Battochio • Ken Carroll
