= Steven Delisle =

Canadian ice hockey player (born 1990)

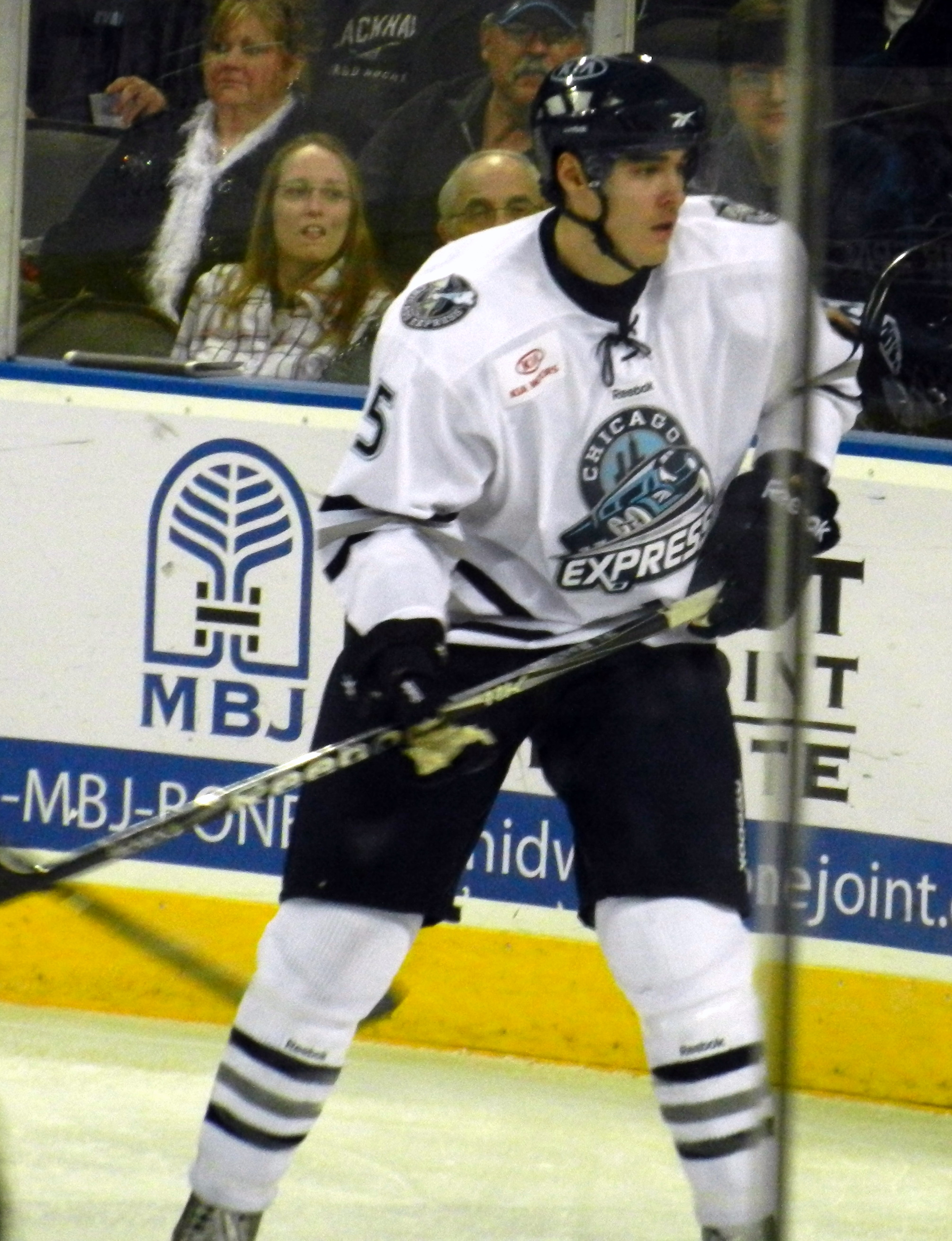
- Delisle with the Chicago Express in 2011
- Born: July 30, 1990 (age 35) Lévis, Quebec, Canada
- Height: 6 ft 5 in (196 cm)
- Weight: 209 lb (95 kg; 14 st 13 lb)
- Position: Defence
- Shot: Right
- Played for: Springfield Falcons; Connecticut Whale; Adirondack Phantoms; Lehigh Valley Phantoms; HC '05 Banská Bystrica; HC Sparta Praha; Löwen Frankfurt
- NHL draft: 107th overall, 2008; Columbus Blue Jackets
- Playing career: 2010–2020

Steven Delisle (born July 30, 1990) is a Canadian former professional ice hockey defenceman. He most notably played in the American Hockey League (AHL).

== Playing career ==
Delisle was drafted 107th overall, in the 2008 NHL entry draft by the Columbus Blue Jackets from the Quebec Major Junior Hockey League. On May 6, 2010, he was signed to a three-year entry-level contract to begin his professional career within the Blue Jackets organization.

On July 23, 2012, Delisle was traded by the Blue Jackets, along with Rick Nash and a conditional third round selection in the 2013 NHL entry draft, to the New York Rangers for Brandon Dubinsky, Artem Anisimov, Tim Erixon and a 2013 first round draft pick.

During the 2012-13 season, on April 3, 2013, Delisle was again included in a major trade between the New York Rangers and Columbus Blue Jackets, when he was returned to Columbus along with Marian Gaborik and Blake Parlett in exchange for Derick Brassard, John Moore, Derek Dorsett, and a sixth-round pick. Delisle was given permission to continue with the Greenville Road Warriors of the ECHL for the season, and was not tendered a qualifying offer to remain with the Blue Jackets at the conclusion of his contract.

On August 20, 2013, Delisle agreed to a one-year AHL contract with the Adirondack Phantoms, an affiliate of the Philadelphia Flyers.

Delisle signed a one-year contract with the Springfield Falcons on August 10, 2015. In the ensuing 2015–16 season, Delisle was a regular feature on the Falcons blueline, appearing in 56 games with 3 goals and 13 points.

Unsigned over the following summer, Delisle belatedly signed an ECHL contract into the 2016–17 season with the South Carolina Stingrays on November 1, 2016.

Delisle played a lone season in the Czech Extraliga (ELH) with HC Sparta Praha, contributing with 5 points in 45 games from the blueline. On June 27, 2019, Delisle left Prague as a free agent.

== Career statistics ==
			Regular season					Playoffs
Season	Team	League	GP	G	A	Pts	PIM	GP	G	A	Pts	PIM
2006–07	Gatineau Olympiques	QMJHL	56	1	11	12	47	5	0	0	0	0
2007–08	Gatineau Olympiques	QMJHL	70	6	23	29	89	19	0	10	10	16
2008–09	Gatineau Olympiques	QMJHL	63	5	25	30	94	10	2	3	5	15
2009–10	Gatineau Olympiques	QMJHL	39	4	19	23	63	—	—	—	—	—
2009–10	Rouyn-Noranda Huskies	QMJHL	25	1	5	6	16	11	2	2	4	12
2010–11	Fort Wayne Komets	CHL	6	0	0	0	2	—	—	—	—	—
2011–12	Springfield Falcons	AHL	6	0	0	0	8	—	—	—	—	—
2011–12	Chicago Express	ECHL	38	1	3	4	20	—	—	—	—	—
2012–13	Greenville Road Warriors	ECHL	61	4	16	20	85	2	0	0	0	20
2012–13	Connecticut Whale	AHL	4	0	2	2	6	—	—	—	—	—
2013–14	Adirondack Phantoms	AHL	50	1	3	4	76	—	—	—	—	—
2014–15	Lehigh Valley Phantoms	AHL	62	2	13	15	133	—	—	—	—	—
2015–16	Springfield Falcons	AHL	56	3	10	13	74	—	—	—	—	—
2016–17	South Carolina Stingrays	ECHL	11	0	1	1	4	—	—	—	—	—
2016–17	Norfolk Admirals	ECHL	9	0	1	1	15	—	—	—	—	—
2017–18	HC '05 Banská Bystrica	Slovak	27	3	4	7	8	16	1	4	5	24
2018–19	HC Sparta Praha	ELH	45	3	2	5	42	2	1	0	1	0
2019–20	Löwen Frankfurt	DEL2	35	5	9	14	30	—	—	—	—	—
AHL totals			178	6	28	34	297	—	—	—	—	—
