= Allen York =

Canadian ice hockey player

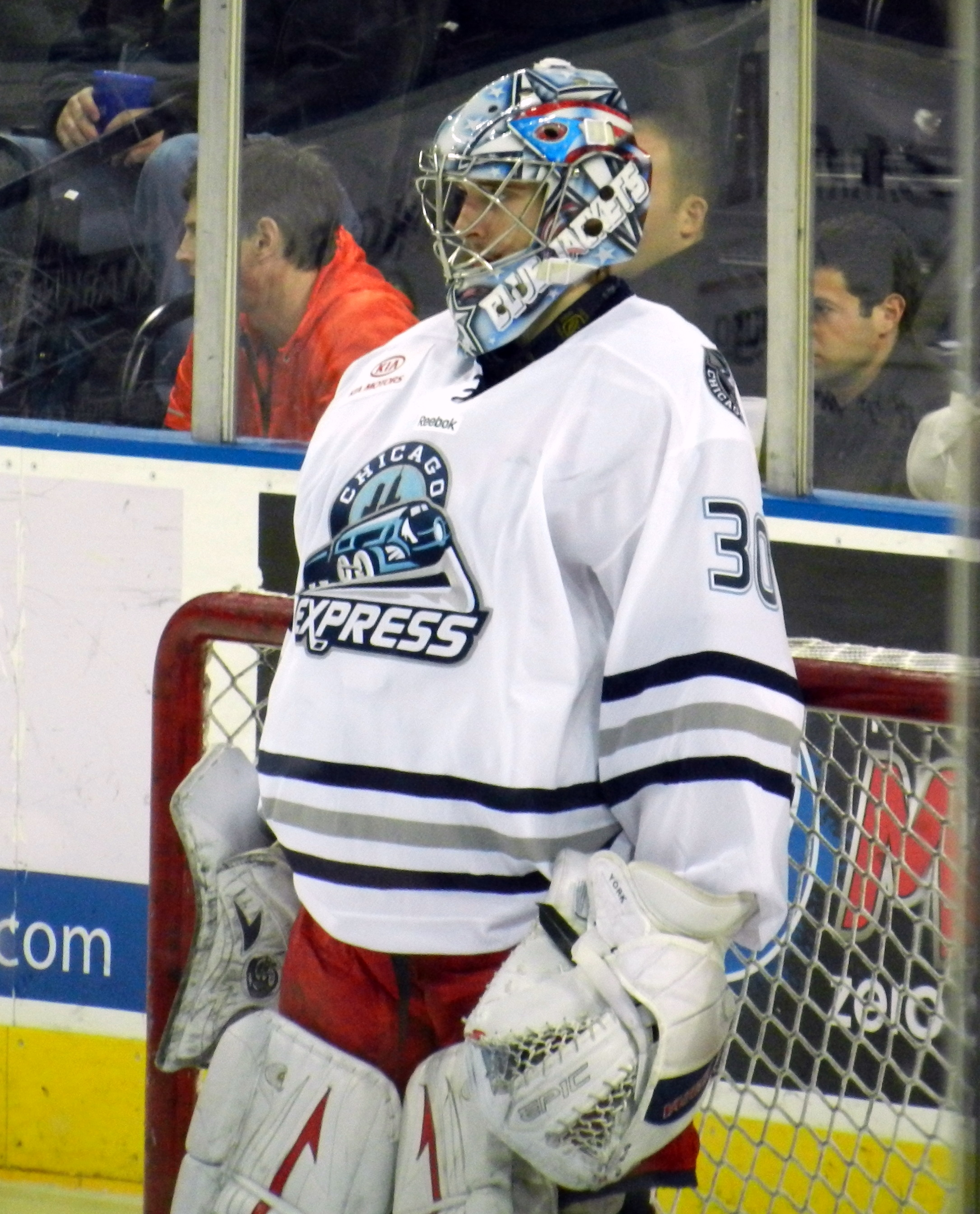
- York playing for the Chicago Express in 2012
- Born: June 17, 1989 (age 37) Wetaskiwin, Alberta, Canada
- Height: 6 ft 4 in (193 cm)
- Weight: 190 lb (86 kg; 13 st 8 lb)
- Position: Goaltender
- Caught: Left
- Played for: Columbus Blue Jackets
- NHL draft: 158th overall, 2007; Columbus Blue Jackets
- Playing career: 2010–2016
Medal record
Ice hockey
Representing Canada West
World Junior A Challenge
Gold medal – first place	2007 Trail

Allen York (born June 17, 1989) is a Canadian former professional ice hockey goaltender who played 11 games with the Columbus Blue Jackets in the National Hockey League. York was selected by the Blue Jackets in the 6th round (158th overall) of the 2007 NHL entry draft.

== Playing career ==
Prior to turning professional, York attended Rensselaer Polytechnic Institute where he played three seasons with the R.P.I. Engineers which competed in the NCAA's Division I's, ECAC Hockey conference.

On March 29, 2011, the Columbus Blue Jackets signed York to a two-year professional contract.

In his rookie professional season in 2011–12 on October 19, 2011, the Blue Jackets called up York on emergency recall from the AHL affiliate, the Springfield Falcons after injuries to Mark Dekanich and Curtis Sanford. He made his NHL debut and played his first game on October 25, 2011, against the Detroit Red Wings when Steve Mason was injured in the first period. Later in the season in a second emergency recall, on March 28, 2012, he made 29 saves for his first NHL victory, as the Columbus Blue Jackets defeated the Detroit Red Wings, 4–2.

In the following season, his final year of contract with the Blue Jackets, York remained stationed between affiliates the Springfield Falcons and Evansville IceMen of the ECHL.

A free agent from the Blue Jackets, on September 12, 2013, Allen joined the Nashville Predators training camp on a pro tryout. Unable to secure an NHL contract with Nashville, York upon his release signed to remain with the Evansville Icemen for the 2013–14 season. After an earlier single game stint with the Charlotte Checkers, on November 2, 2013, York was loaned to the Texas Stars of the AHL on a pro tryout contract before returning to the IceMen after 6 games with the Stars on December 5. Five days later, York was assigned on try-out to a short stint with the Rockford IceHogs.

On December 20, 2013, York was listed and played on team Canada's Spengler Cup roster. York played only 6 games with the IceMen before on January 14, 2014, he was traded to the South Carolina Stingrays in for future considerations. York continued his whirlwind season by later joining his fourth AHL club and sixth team in the season, in playing six game with the Syracuse Crunch on loan before returning to the Stingrays.

York was rewarded from his earlier tenure with the Crunch in signing as a free agent on one-year AHL contract with the club on July 8, 2014. After playing the first half of the 2014–15 season, with ECHL affiliate the Florida Everblades, York made his Crunch season debut on February 7, 2015, against the Springfield Falcons. On February 23, 2015, York was signed for the remainder of the season on a two-way deal with NHL affiliate, the Tampa Bay Lightning.

In the midst of the 2015–16 season, after playing with the Greenville Swamp Rabbits while under contract to the Crunch, York opted to end his professional career announcing his retirement on March 4, 2016.

== Career statistics ==
			Regular season									Playoffs
Season	Team	League	GP	W	L	T/OT	MIN	GA	SO	GAA	SV%	GP	W	L	MIN	GA	SO	GAA	SV%
2006–07	Camrose Kodiaks	AJHL	32	23	4	0	1661	60	2	2.17	.906	22	16	6	1391	46	4	1.98	—
2007–08	Camrose Kodiaks	AJHL	37	24	5	3	2005	75	3	2.24	.910	16	—	—	—	—	—	—	—
2008–09	R.P.I. Engineers	ECAC	16	5	10	0	913	46	1	3.02	.901	—	—	—	—	—	—	—	—
2009–10	R.P.I. Engineers	ECAC	33	14	13	4	1935	82	1	2.54	.910	—	—	—	—	—	—	—	—
2010–11	R.P.I. Engineers	ECAC	34	18	11	4	2050	74	2	2.17	.924	—	—	—	—	—	—	—	—
2010–11	Springfield Falcons	AHL	4	3	1	0	206	7	1	2.04	.926	—	—	—	—	—	—	—	—
2011–12	Springfield Falcons	AHL	5	1	1	0	183	12	0	3.94	.871	—	—	—	—	—	—	—	—
2011–12	Columbus Blue Jackets	NHL	11	3	2	0	417	16	0	2.30	.919	—	—	—	—	—	—	—	—
2011–12	Chicago Express	ECHL	11	4	4	2	604	33	0	3.28	.892	—	—	—	—	—	—	—	—
2012–13	Springfield Falcons	AHL	19	13	6	0	1130	45	0	2.39	.907	1	0	0	30	0	0	0.00	1.000
2012–13	Evansville IceMen	ECHL	5	3	1	1	265	12	0	2.72	.919	—	—	—	—	—	—	—	—
2013–14	Evansville IceMen	ECHL	6	3	3	0	364	25	0	4.12	.863	—	—	—	—	—	—	—	—
2013–14	Charlotte Checkers	AHL	1	0	0	1	64	1	0	0.94	.966	—	—	—	—	—	—	—	—
2013–14	Texas Stars	AHL	6	3	1	1	333	15	1	2.71	.910	—	—	—	—	—	—	—	—
2013–14	Rockford IceHogs	AHL	1	0	1	0	58	3	0	3.08	.921	—	—	—	—	—	—	—	—
2013–14	South Carolina Stingrays	ECHL	14	8	4	1	786	30	1	2.29	.922	3	0	3	179	7	0	2.35	920
2013–14	Syracuse Crunch	AHL	4	1	2	1	247	12	1	2.92	.900	—	—	—	—	—	—	—	—
2014–15	Florida Everblades	ECHL	26	17	5	3	1503	66	4	2.63	.903	8	4	3	481	20	0	2.50	.899
2014–15	Syracuse Crunch	AHL	8	2	3	1	350	19	0	3.26	.895	—	—	—	—	—	—	—	—
2015–16	Greenville Swamp Rabbits	ECHL	17	6	8	2	904	53	1	3.52	.897	—	—	—	—	—	—	—	—
2015–16	Syracuse Crunch	AHL	1	0	1	0	60	4	0	4.00	.846	—	—	—	—	—	—	—	—
NHL totals			11	3	2	0	417	16	0	2.30	.919	—	—	—	—	—	—	—	—

== Awards and honours ==
Award	Year
College
All-ECAC Second Team	2009–10
All-ECAC Third Team	2010–11
