= Devin DiDiomete =

Canadian-born Italian ice hockey player

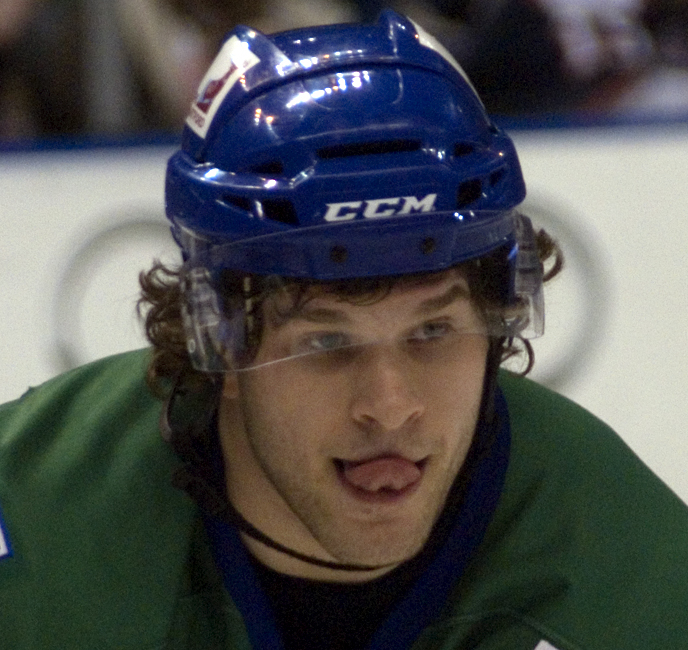
- DiDiomete playing for the Connecticut Whale in January 2011
- Born: May 9, 1988 (age 38) Stratford, Ontario, Canada
- Height: 6 ft 0 in (183 cm)
- Weight: 210 lb (95 kg; 15 st 0 lb)
- Position: Left wing
- Shoots: Left
- Erste team Former teams: Gyergyói HK; Hartford Wolf Pack; Wilkes-Barre/Scranton Penguins; Houston Aeros; Cardiff Devils; Chicago Wolves; Färjestads BK; Hockey Milano Rossoblu; Sheffield Steelers; HC ’05 Banská Bystrica; Manchester Storm; HC Fassa; SG Cortina; UTE; HC Merano
- NHL draft: 187th overall, 2006; Calgary Flames
- Playing career: 2008–present

Devin Robert DiDiomete (born May 9, 1988) is a Canadian-born Italian professional ice hockey player who plays left wing. He currently is playing with Gyergyói HK in the Erste Liga. DiDiomete was selected by the Calgary Flames in the 7th round (187th overall) of the 2006 NHL entry draft.

== Playing career ==
On October 20, 2008, DiDiomete was signed as a free agent by the New York Rangers. During the 2012-13 season, DiDiomete spent time with the Cardiff Devils of the Elite Ice Hockey League, the Milverton Four Wheel Drives of the Western Ontario Athletic Association Senior Hockey League, the Colorado Eagles of the ECHL, and the Chicago Wolves of the American Hockey League.

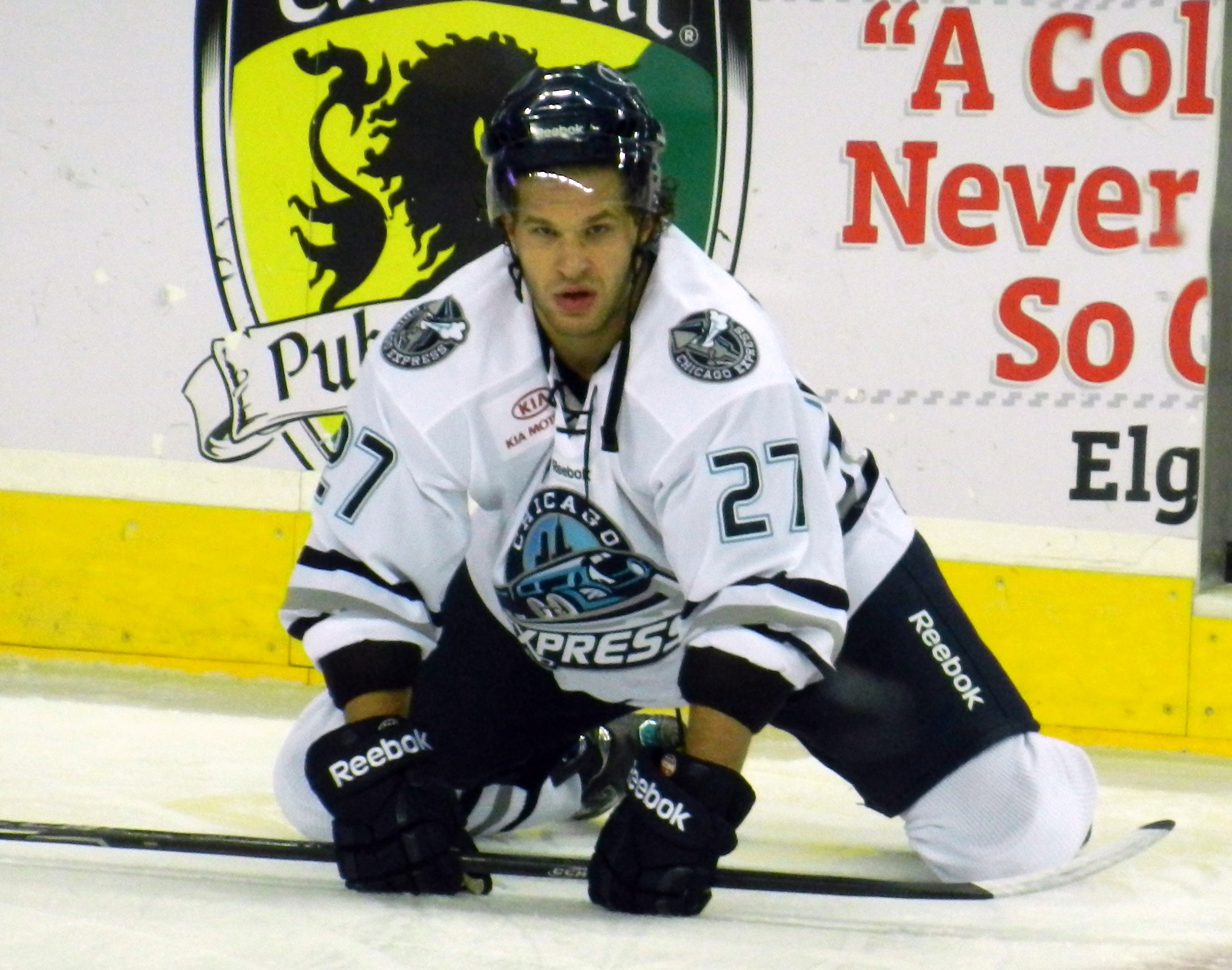
DiDiomete playing for the Chicago Express in November 2011.

On September 19, 2014, DiDiomete signed with Färjestads BK of the Swedish Hockey League after being given a try-out by the team on July 17, 2014. After going scoreless in 12 games with Färjestads BK, DiDiomete briefly returned to the Milverton Four Wheel Drives before agreeing to play out the remainder of the season with the Italian club Hockey Milano Rossoblu of the Serie A.

After a short stint with the Sheffield Steelers of the Elite Ice Hockey League to start the 2014–15 season, DiDiomete joined the Allen Americans of the ECHL. On November 11, 2014, DiDiomete was traded to the Missouri Mavericks of the ECHL in exchange for future considerations. On November 24, 2014, the Mavericks traded DiDiomete to the Idaho Steelheads of the ECHL for undisclosed considerations.

On July 6, 2015, DiDiomete returned to play in Europe when he signed with HC Banska Bystrica of the Slovak Extraliga.

DiDiomete has since played with Manchester Storm, HC Fassa, SG Cortina, UTE and HC Merano.

== Career statistics ==
| | | | Regular season | | | | | Playoffs |
| Season | Team | League | GP | G | A | Pts | PIM | GP | G | A | Pts | PIM |
|---|---|---|---|---|---|---|---|---|---|---|---|---|
| 2002–03 | Stratford Cullitons | MWJHL | 9 | 0 | 1 | 1 | 6 | — | — | — | — | — |
| 2003–04 | Stratford Cullitons | MWJHL | 40 | 9 | 18 | 27 | 102 | 11 | 0 | 1 | 1 | 34 |
| 2004–05 | Sudbury Wolves | OHL | 58 | 7 | 8 | 15 | 113 | 11 | 0 | 1 | 1 | 11 |
| 2005–06 | Sudbury Wolves | OHL | 60 | 15 | 21 | 36 | 202 | 10 | 0 | 4 | 4 | 26 |
| 2006–07 | Sudbury Wolves | OHL | 62 | 21 | 19 | 40 | 205 | 21 | 6 | 6 | 12 | 62 |
| 2007–08 | Sarnia Sting | OHL | 56 | 23 | 33 | 56 | 216 | 9 | 1 | 2 | 3 | 40 |
| 2008–09 | Hartford Wolf Pack | AHL | 73 | 4 | 5 | 9 | 239 | 4 | 0 | 0 | 0 | 6 |
| 2009–10 | Hartford Wolf Pack | AHL | 34 | 0 | 2 | 2 | 119 | — | — | — | — | — |
| 2009–10 | Charlotte Checkers | ECHL | 15 | 2 | 2 | 4 | 128 | — | — | — | — | — |
| 2010−11 | Hartford Wolf Pack/CT Whale | AHL | 63 | 6 | 4 | 10 | 303 | — | — | — | — | — |
| 2011−12 | Wilkes–Barre/Scranton Penguins | AHL | 2 | 0 | 0 | 0 | 2 | — | — | — | — | — |
| 2011−12 | Wheeling Nailers | ECHL | 2 | 1 | 1 | 2 | 4 | — | — | — | — | — |
| 2011−12 | Chicago Express | ECHL | 41 | 11 | 16 | 27 | 277 | — | — | — | — | — |
| 2011−12 | Houston Aeros | AHL | 1 | 0 | 0 | 0 | 0 | — | — | — | — | — |
| 2012–13 | Cardiff Devils | EIHL | 25 | 2 | 10 | 12 | 169 | — | — | — | — | — |
| 2012–13 | Milverton Four Wheel Drives | WOAA | 1 | 0 | 0 | 0 | 4 | — | — | — | — | — |
| 2012–13 | Colorado Eagles | ECHL | 9 | 4 | 3 | 7 | 45 | — | — | — | — | — |
| 2012–13 | Chicago Wolves | AHL | 23 | 2 | 3 | 5 | 57 | — | — | — | — | — |
| 2013–14 | Färjestads BK | SHL | 12 | 0 | 0 | 0 | 32 | — | — | — | — | — |
| 2013–14 | Milverton Four Wheel Drives | WOAA | 2 | 0 | 1 | 1 | 9 | — | — | — | — | — |
| 2013–14 | Hockey Milano Rossoblu | ITA | 23 | 10 | 14 | 24 | 65 | 4 | 6 | 1 | 7 | 12 |
| 2014–15 | Sheffield Steelers | EIHL | 5 | 1 | 1 | 2 | 12 | — | — | — | — | — |
| 2014–15 | Allen Americans | ECHL | 4 | 0 | 2 | 2 | 20 | — | — | — | — | — |
| 2014–15 | Missouri Mavericks | ECHL | 5 | 0 | 2 | 2 | 44 | — | — | — | — | — |
| 2014–15 | Idaho Steelheads | ECHL | 35 | 3 | 4 | 7 | 120 | — | — | — | — | — |
| 2015–16 | HC ’05 iClinic Banská Bystrica | SVK | 7 | 0 | 0 | 0 | 54 | — | — | — | — | — |
| 2015–16 | Manchester Storm | EIHL | 27 | 4 | 3 | 7 | 171 | — | — | — | — | — |
| 2016–17 | HC Fassa | AlpsHL | 38 | 13 | 19 | 32 | 129 | — | — | — | — | — |
| 2017–18 | HC Fassa | AlpsHL | 36 | 17 | 18 | 35 | 95 | — | — | — | — | — |
| 2018–19 | SG Cortina | AlpsHL | 39 | 23 | 11 | 34 | 109 | 6 | 1 | 3 | 4 | 20 |
| 2019–20 | UTE | EL | 39 | 13 | 23 | 36 | 51 | 6 | 1 | 5 | 6 | 20 |
| 2021–22 | HC Merano | AlpsHL | 15 | 2 | 3 | 5 | 39 | — | — | — | — | — |
| 2021–22 | Gyergyói HK | EL | 14 | 1 | 1 | 2 | 50 | 5 | 0 | 1 | 1 | 20 |
| 2021–22 | Gyergyói HK | ROU | 15 | 14 | 9 | 23 | 55 | 1 | 0 | 0 | 0 | 0 |
| 2022–23 | Gyergyói HK | EL | 30 | 4 | 3 | 7 | 143 | 18 | 1 | 2 | 3 |
| AHL totals | | | 196 | 12 | 14 | 26 | 720 | 4 | 0 | 0 | 0 | 6 |
| ECHL totals | | | 111 | 21 | 30 | 51 | 638 | — | — | — | — | — |
| AlpsHL totals | | | 128 | 55 | 51 | 106 | 372 | 6 | 1 | 3 | 4 | 20 |
