= Sacha Guimond =

Canadian ice hockey player

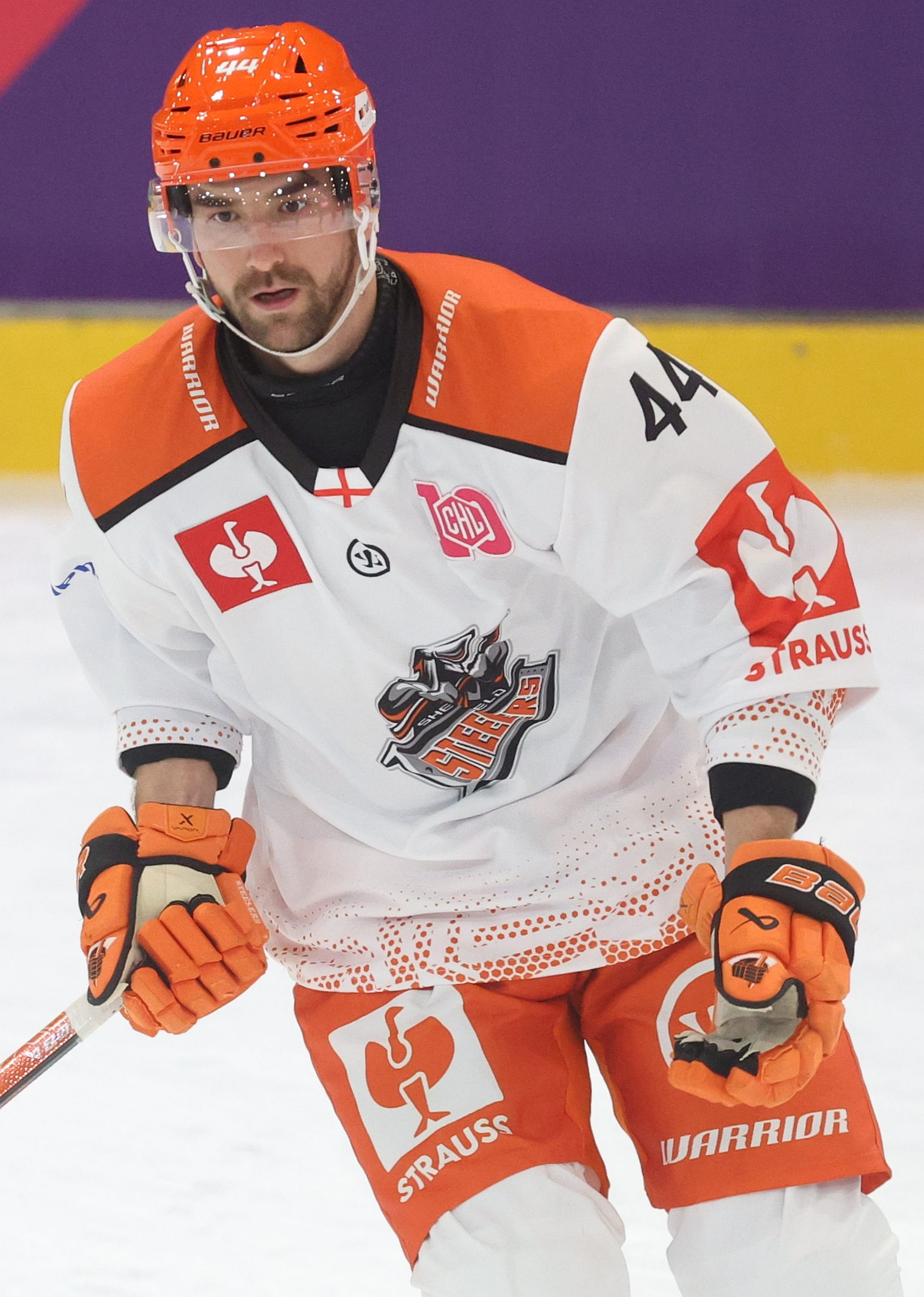
- Sacha Guimond in 2024
- Born: March 28, 1991 (age 34); Ville-Marie, Quebec, Canada
- Height: 6 ft 2 in (188 cm)
- Weight: 190 lb (86 kg; 13 st 8 lb)
- Position: Defence
- Shoots: Left
- AlpsHL team Former teams: HC Gherdëina; Worcester Sharks; Norfolk Admirals; Utica Comets; HC ’05 Banská Bystrica; HDD Olimpija Ljubljana; HC TWK Innsbruck; Bratislava Capitals; Rouen Dragons; Sheffield Steelers
- NHL draft: Undrafted
- Playing career: 2012–present

Sacha Guimond (born March 28, 1991) is a Canadian professional ice hockey defenceman. Having already played in Canada, the United States, Slovenia, Slovakia, Austria, France and United Kingdom he now plays for the HC Gherdëina in Italy.

== Playing career ==
Guimond played major junior hockey in both the Ontario Hockey League and the Quebec Major Junior Hockey League.

His professional career started in 2012 when he first played with the San Francisco Bulls and then with the Gwinnett Gladiators, both of the ECHL. He also played six games in the American Hockey League during his first season. Guimond was rewarded for his outstanding play when the ECHL named him the 2012–13 defenceman of the year and selected him to both the All-Rookie and All-ECHL teams

On July 12, 2013, Guimond signed a one-year contract with the Utica Comets of the American Hockey League, an affiliate of the Vancouver Canucks.

After a second stint with the Kalamazoo Wings, Guimond left to resume his European career, agreeing to a one-year deal with Slovenian club, HDD Olimpija Ljubljana, competing in the Austrian EBEL, on July 6, 2016. Following further stints in Austria and Slovakia, he left the Slovak Bratislava Capitals to join Rouen in France.

In August 2024, Sacha Guimond would move to the Sheffield Steelers.

In June 2025, Guimond would sign for Italian side HC Gherdëina for the 2025–26 season.

== Career statistics ==
=== Regular season and playoffs ===
			Regular season					Playoffs
Season	Team	League	GP	G	A	Pts	PIM	GP	G	A	Pts	PIM

== Awards and honours ==
Award	Year
ECHL
All-Rookie Team	2012–13
First All-Star Team	2012–13
Defenceman of the Year	2012–13
