= Dustin Gazley =

Italian-American ice hockey player

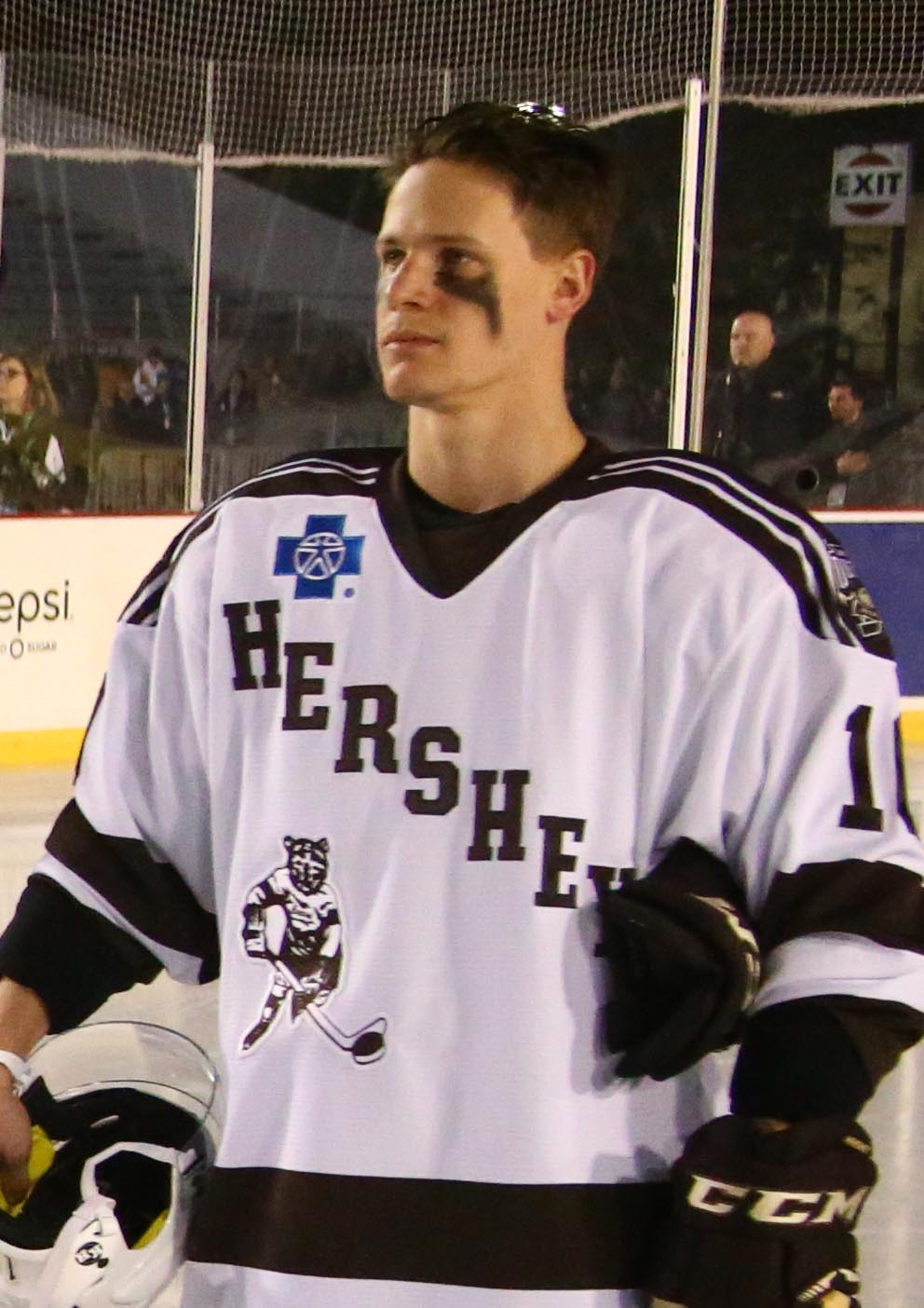
- Born: October 3, 1988 (age 37) Novi, Michigan, U.S.
- Height: 5 ft 9 in (175 cm)
- Weight: 165 lb (75 kg; 11 st 11 lb)
- Position: Winger
- Shoots: Right
- ICEHL team Former teams: HC Bolzano; Binghamton Senators; Hershey Bears; EC Red Bull Salzburg; Mora IK
- National team: Italy
- NHL draft: Undrafted
- Playing career: 2011–present

Dustin James Gazley (born October 3, 1988) is an Italian–American professional ice hockey player who is a winger for HC Bolzano of the ICE Hockey League (ICEHL).

== Playing career ==
Undrafted, Gazley played collegiate hockey for Michigan State in the Central Collegiate Hockey Association from 2007 through 2011.

He made his professional debut with Greenville Road Warriors of the ECHL to end the 2010–11 season, before later making his American Hockey League (AHL) debut with the Binghamton Senators during the 2012–13 season.

On August 7, 2013, Gazley signed an initial one-year AHL contract with the Hershey Bears.

After his fifth season with the Bears in 2017–18, and having enjoyed a 278-game career in the AHL, Gazley left as a free agent to sign his first contract abroad, agreeing to a one-year deal with Austrian outfit, EC Red Bull Salzburg, of the EBEL on July 12, 2018.

== Personal life ==
Gazley is of Italian descent through his mother, with roots in Sicily, and held dual American and Italian citizenship since the early 2000s.

== Career statistics ==
=== Regular season and playoffs ===
			Regular season					Playoffs
Season	Team	League	GP	G	A	Pts	PIM	GP	G	A	Pts	PIM
2005–06	Sioux City Musketeers	USHL	55	16	14	30	29	—	—	—	—	—
2006–07	Sioux City Musketeers	USHL	40	3	9	12	31	—	—	—	—	—
2007–08	Michigan State University	CCHA	40	3	9	12	31	—	—	—	—	—
2008–09	Michigan State University	CCHA	37	7	7	14	34	—	—	—	—	—
2009–10	Michigan State University	CCHA	38	9	12	21	28	—	—	—	—	—
2010–11	Michigan State University	CCHA	38	11	15	26	42	—	—	—	—	—
2010–11	Greenville Road Warriors	ECHL	2	0	0	0	0	—	—	—	—	—
2011–12	Elmira Jackals	ECHL	72	25	60	85	73	10	1	7	8	2
2012–13	Elmira Jackals	ECHL	37	14	35	49	15	—	—	—	—	—
2012–13	Binghamton Senators	AHL	29	4	5	9	12	1	0	0	0	0
2013–14	Reading Royals	ECHL	25	8	10	18	22	3	0	0	0	0
2013–14	Hershey Bears	AHL	42	8	7	15	18	—	—	—	—	—
2014–15	Hershey Bears	AHL	72	18	20	38	36	10	2	2	4	0
2015–16	Hershey Bears	AHL	61	14	17	31	47	16	4	5	9	4
2016–17	Hershey Bears	AHL	3	1	0	1	0	12	1	0	1	8
2017–18	Hershey Bears	AHL	71	11	21	32	46	—	—	—	—	—
2018–19	EC Red Bull Salzburg	EBEL	37	14	17	31	16	8	3	2	5	2
2019–20	Mora IK	Allsv	31	9	11	20	12	—	—	—	—	—
2020–21	HC Bolzano	ICEHL	48	17	27	44	6	9	3	6	9	0
2021–22	HC Bolzano	ICEHL	38	10	21	31	8	2	1	0	1	2
2022–23	HC Bolzano	ICEHL	47	17	31	48	14	18	9	4	13	4
2023–24	HC Bolzano	ICEHL	48	18	13	31	26	12	6	5	11	4
2024–25	HC Bolzano	ICEHL	29	8	14	22	10	11	5	7	12	0
AHL totals			278	56	70	126	159	39	7	7	14	12

=== International ===
Year	Team	Event	Result	GP	G	A	Pts	PIM
2024	Italy	WC D1A	19th	5	1	2	3	0
2025	Italy	WC D1A	18th	5	0	4	4	0
2026	Italy	OG	12th	4	1	2	3	2
Senior totals				14	2	8	10	2

== Awards and honors ==
Award	Year
ECHL
Rookie of the Year	2012
Scoring Leader	2012
First All-Star Team	2012
All-Star Game	2013
