= Scott Lehman =

Canadian ice hockey player (born 1986)

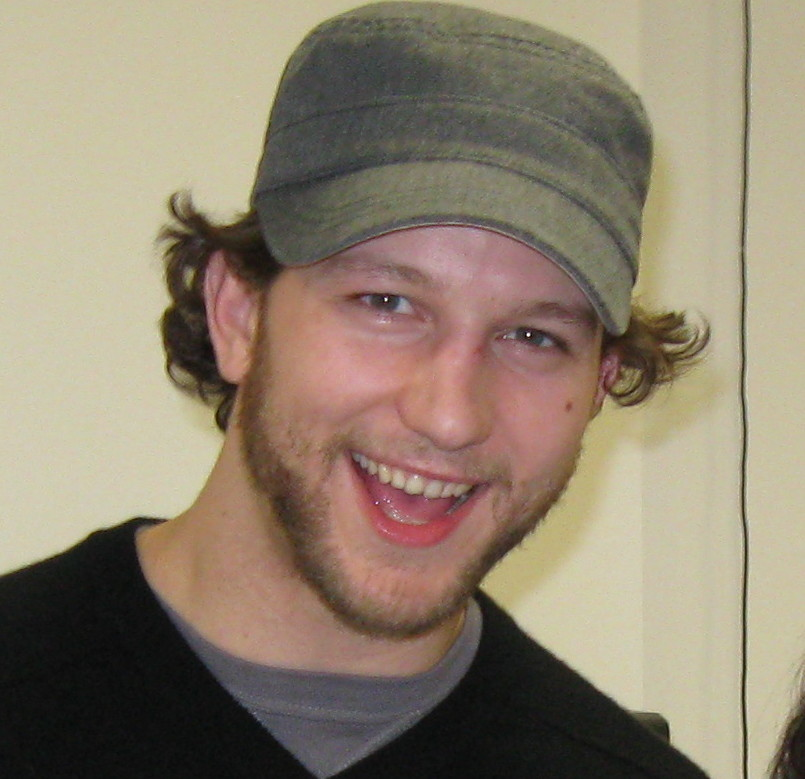
- Born: January 5, 1986 (age 39); Fort McMurray, Alberta, Canada
- Height: 6 ft 1 in (185 cm)
- Weight: 195 lb (88 kg; 13 st 13 lb)
- Position: Defence
- Shot: Left
- Played for: Atlanta Thrashers
- NHL draft: 76th overall, 2004; Atlanta Thrashers
- Playing career: 2006–2012

Scott Lehman (born January 5, 1986) is a former Canadian professional ice hockey defenceman who played in one game for the Atlanta Thrashers of the National Hockey League (NHL).

== Career statistics ==
			Regular season					Playoffs
Season	Team	League	GP	G	A	Pts	PIM	GP	G	A	Pts	PIM
2001–02	Tecumseh Chiefs	WOHL	51	7	11	18	79	4	0	3	3	4
2002–03	Toronto St. Michael's Majors	OHL	53	3	10	13	50	19	1	3	4	34
2003–04	Toronto St. Michael's Majors	OHL	66	5	27	32	189	18	2	2	4	38
2004–05	Toronto St. Michael's Majors	OHL	57	2	19	21	189	10	2	2	4	31
2005–06	Toronto St. Michael's Majors	OHL	68	5	50	55	175	4	0	2	2	15
2006–07	Chicago Wolves	AHL	3	0	0	0	14	—	—	—	—	—
2006–07	Gwinnett Gladiators	ECHL	72	2	12	14	86	4	0	0	0	11
2007–08	Gwinnett Gladiators	ECHL	6	0	2	2	18	—	—	—	—	—
2007–08	Chicago Wolves	AHL	40	2	5	7	109	—	—	—	—	—
2008–09	Chicago Wolves	AHL	50	2	3	5	86	—	—	—	—	—
2008–09	Atlanta Thrashers	NHL	1	0	0	0	0	—	—	—	—	—
2009–10	Chicago Wolves	AHL	11	0	2	2	16	—	—	—	—	—
2010–11	Milwaukee Admirals	AHL	2	0	0	0	4	—	—	—	—	—
2010–11	Cincinnati Cyclones	ECHL	49	7	10	17	104	4	1	1	2	2
2011–12	Chicago Express	ECHL	11	0	2	2	7	—	—	—	—	—
AHL totals			106	4	10	14	231	—	—	—	—	—
ECHL totals			138	9	26	35	215	8	1	1	2	13
NHL totals			1	0	0	0	0	—	—	—	—	—

== See also ==
- List of players who played only one game in the NHL
