= Drew Paris =

Canadian ice hockey player (born 1988)

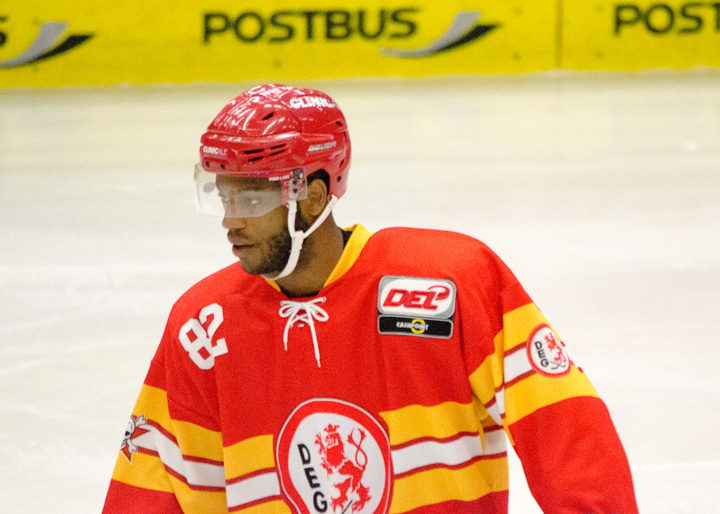
- Born: May 12, 1988 (age 38) Pointe-Claire, Quebec, Canada
- Height: 6 ft 4 in (193 cm)
- Weight: 203 lb (92 kg; 14 st 7 lb)
- Position: Defence
- Shoots: Right
- LNAH team Former teams: Saint-Georges Cool FM 103.5; Rochester Americans; Toronto Marlies; Düsseldorfer EG; Tingsryds AIF; Modo Hockey; Dornbirner EC; Cardiff Devils; Karlskrona HK
- NHL draft: Undrafted
- Playing career: 2009–present

Drew Paris (born May 12, 1988) is a Canadian professional ice hockey defenceman. He is currently playing for LNAH side Saint-Georges Cool FM 103.5.

== Playing career ==
Prior to turning professional with the Rochester Americans, Paris played major junior hockey in the Quebec Major Junior Hockey League.

After splitting the 2011-12 season, between the Chicago Express of the ECHL and the Toronto Marlies of the AHL, Paris signed a one-year contract with European team, Düsseldorfer EG, of the DEL.

On June 21, 2016, after a successful 2015–16 season in Sweden with Tingsryds AIF of the second tier HockeyAllsvenskan, Paris opted to remain in Sweden, signing with newly demoted Allsvenskan club, Modo Hockey on a one-year deal.

After a spell with Dornbirner EC, Paris moved to the UK to sign for EIHL side Cardiff Devils in June 2017.

Paris has since spent time with Swedish side Karlskrona HK and in Canada with Saint-Georges Cool FM 103.5.

== Career statistics ==
			Regular season					Playoffs
Season	Team	League	GP	G	A	Pts	PIM	GP	G	A	Pts	PIM
2004–05	Quebec Remparts	QMJHL	45	1	4	5	6	13	3	0	3	0
2005–06	Quebec Remparts	QMJHL	35	4	8	12	22	—	—	—	—	—
2005–06	Rimouski Océanic	QMJHL	30	4	8	12	26	—	—	—	—	—
2006–07	Drummondville Voltigeurs	QMJHL	70	11	42	53	54	12	3	5	8	10
2007–08	Drummondville Voltigeurs	QMJHL	38	9	19	28	39	—	—	—	—	—
2007–08	Acadie-Bathurst Titan	QMJHL	31	13	14	27	33	12	5	10	15	8
2008–09	Acadie-Bathurst Titan	QMJHL	37	7	20	27	32	—	—	—	—	—
2008–09	Chicoutimi Saguenéens	QMJHL	29	13	17	30	31	4	1	5	6	2
2008–09	Rochester Americans	AHL	5	0	0	0	0	—	—	—	—	—
2008–09	Florida Everblades	ECHL	4	0	2	2	0	—	—	—	—	—
2008–09	Gwinnett Gladiators	ECHL	—	—	—	—	—	2	0	0	0	4
2009–10	Gwinnett Gladiators	ECHL	68	12	33	45	60	—	—	—	—	—
2009–10	Toronto Marlies	AHL	2	1	2	3	2	—	—	—	—	—
2010–11	Gwinnett Gladiators	ECHL	39	2	10	12	22	—	—	—	—	—
2010–11	Elmira Jackals	ECHL	30	4	5	9	21	4	0	0	0	2
2010–11	Toronto Marlies	AHL	1	0	0	0	0	—	—	—	—	—
2011–12	Chicago Express	ECHL	22	3	6	9	10	—	—	—	—	—
2011–12	Toronto Marlies	AHL	21	1	1	2	10	—	—	—	—	—
2012–13	Düsseldorfer EG	DEL	43	9	5	14	36	—	—	—	—	—
2013–14	Düsseldorfer EG	DEL	51	8	15	23	26	—	—	—	—	—
2014–15	EC Bad Nauheim	DEL2	49	10	22	32	26	—	—	—	—	—
2015–16	Tingsryds AIF	Allsv	47	13	13	26	24	7	0	3	3	2
2016–17	Modo Hockey	Allsv	26	2	2	4	14	—	—	—	—	—
2016–17	Dornbirner EC	EBEL	4	0	0	0	4	—	—	—	—	—
2017–18	Cardiff Devils	EIHL	44	6	14	20	47	2	0	0	0	0
2018–19	Karlskrona HK	Allsv	44	4	7	11	45	1	0	0	0	0
2019–20	Saint-Georges Cool FM 103.5	LNAH	26	2	11	13	6	—	—	—	—	—
AHL totals			29	2	3	5	12	—	—	—	—	—

== Awards and honours ==
Award	Year
QMJHL Most Goals by Defenseman (22)	2007–08
ECHL All-Rookie Team	2009–10
