= 2009–10 CHL season =

- League: Central Hockey League
- Sport: Ice hockey
- Teams: 15

Regular season
- Governors’ Cup: Odessa Jackalopes
- Season MVP: Kevin Ulanski (Colorado)
- Top scorer: Kevin Ulanski (Colorado)

Playoffs
- Northern champions: Rapid City Rush
- Northern runners-up: Bossier-Shreveport Mudbugs
- Southern champions: Allen Americans
- Southern runners-up: Odessa Jackalopes

Finals
- Champions: Rapid City Rush
- Runners-up: Allen Americans

CHL seasons
- 2008–09 2010–11

The 2009–10 CHL season was the 18th season of the Central Hockey League (CHL). The season run from October 16, 2009, until March 20, 2010, followed with the Ray Miron President's Cup playoffs.

The 2010 Central Hockey League All-Star Game was on January 13, 2010, at the Laredo Entertainment Center.

The season ended on May 4, 2010, when the Rapid City Rush defeated the Allen Americans in double overtime.

== League business ==
The Allen Americans (Allen, TX) and the Missouri Mavericks (Independence, MO) were added, the New Mexico Scorpions and Oklahoma City Blazers folded, and the Rocky Mountain Rage suspended operations, with hopes of rejoining the league for the 2010–11 season.

== Teams ==
2009-10 Central Hockey League
Conference	Team	City	Arena
Northern	Bossier-Shreveport Mudbugs	Bossier City, Louisiana	CenturyTel Center
Northern	Colorado Eagles	Loveland, Colorado	Budweiser Events Center
Northern	Mississippi RiverKings	Southaven, Mississippi	DeSoto Civic Center
Northern	Missouri Mavericks	Independence, Missouri	Independence Events Center
Northern	Rapid City Rush	Rapid City, South Dakota	Rushmore Plaza Civic Center
Northern	Tulsa Oilers	Tulsa, Oklahoma	BOK Center
Northern	Wichita Thunder	Wichita, Kansas	Britt Brown Arena; Intrust Bank Arena
Southern	Allen Americans	Allen, Texas	Allen Event Center
Southern	Amarillo Gorillas	Amarillo, Texas	Amarillo Civic Center
Southern	Arizona Sundogs	Prescott Valley, Arizona	Tim's Toyota Center
Southern	Corpus Christi IceRays	Corpus Christi, Texas	American Bank Center
Southern	Laredo Bucks	Laredo, Texas	Laredo Entertainment Center
Southern	Odessa Jackalopes	Odessa, Texas	Ector County Coliseum
Southern	Rio Grande Valley Killer Bees	Hidalgo, Texas	Dodge Arena
Southern	Texas Brahmas	North Richland Hills, Texas	NYTEX Sports Centre

== Map of teams ==
Northern Conference Southern Conference

== Regular season ==
=== Conference standings ===
Northern Conference	GP	W	L	OTL	Pts	GF	GA
y-Rapid City Rush	64	43	14	7	93	253	197
x-Colorado Eagles	64	42	15	7	91	277	208
x-Bossier-Shreveport Mudbugs	64	38	22	4	80	213	180
x-Mississippi RiverKings	64	33	24	7	73	217	116
x-Missouri Mavericks	64	31	27	6	68	200	220
e-Tulsa Oilers	64	28	29	7	63	203	230
e-Wichita Thunder	64	9	50	5	23	128	257

Southern Conference	GP	W	L	OTL	Pts	GF	GA
y-Odessa Jackalopes	64	48	11	5	101	269	187
x-Allen Americans	64	42	17	5	89	210	183
x-Laredo Bucks	64	32	20	12	76	218	215
x-Texas Brahmas	64	32	25	7	71	187	190
x-Corpus Christi IceRays	64	30	26	8	68	225	198
e-Rio Grande Valley Killer Bees	64	27	27	10	64	193	228
e-Arizona Sundogs	64	24	34	6	54	199	226
e-Amarillo Gorillas	64	21	34	9	51	197	254

Note: GP = Games played; W = Wins; L = Losses; OTL = Overtime loss; Pts = Points; GF = Goals for; GA = Goals against

y – clinched conference title; x – clinched playoff spot; e – eliminated from playoff contention

== Playoffs ==
=== Playoff Bracket ===
First Round
4	Mississippi	1
5	Missouri	2
4	Texas	2
5	Corpus Christi	0

Semifinals
1	Rapid City	4
5	Missouri	0
Northern
2	Colorado	0
3	Bossier-Shreveport	4
2	Allen	4
3	Laredo	3
Southern
1	Odessa	4
4	Texas	2

Conference Finals
1	Rapid City	4
3	Bossier-Shreveport	3
2	Allen	4
1	Odessa	3

Ray Miron President's Cup Finals
1	Rapid City	4
2	Allen	2

== CHL awards ==
Source:Central Hockey League Historical Award Winners

Ray Miron President's Cup:	Rapid City Rush
Bud Poile Governors' Cup:	Odessa Jackalopes
Most Valuable Player:	Kevin Ulanski (Colorado)
Most Outstanding Goaltender:	Joel Martin (Odessa)
Most Outstanding Defenseman:	Aaron Schneekloth (Colorado)
Rookie of the Year:	Danny Battochio (Rapid City)
Coach of the Year:	Joe Ferras (Rapid City)
Man of the Year:	Justin Quenneville (Corpus Christi)
Rick Kozuback Award:	Jason Duda (Wichita)
Joe Burton Award (Scoring Champion):	Kevin Ulanski (Colorado)
Playoff Most Valuable Player:	Les Reaney (Rapid City)
All-Star Game Most Valuable Player (South Texas):	Sean Muncy (Rio Grande Valley)
All-Star Game Most Valuable Player (CHL All-Stars):	Joel Martin (Texas)
Athletic Trainer of the Year:	Stuart Nichols (Tulsa)
Gunner Garrett Equipment Manager of the Year:	Tony Deynzer (Colorado)
CHL Performance of the Year:	Louis Dumont (Mississippi)
CHL Media Services Award	Bill Althaus (Missouri)
Oakley Three Star Player of the Year Award	Jeff Christian (Missouri)

All-CHL Team

(Canada) F Riley Nelson (Colorado)
(United States) F Kevin Ulanski (Colorado)
(Canada) F Les Reaney (Rapid City)
(Canada) D Aaron Schneekloth (Colorado)
(United States) D Derek Eastman (Tulsa)
(United States) G Joel Martin (Odessa)

CHL All-Rookie Team

(Canada) F Ryan Garbutt (Corpus Christi)
(United States) F Sean Muncy (Rio Grande Valley)
(Canada) F Nick Sirota (Missouri)
(United States) D Jake Obermeyer (Amarillo)
(United States) D Sean Erickson (Tulsa)
(Canada) G Danny Battochio (Rapid City)

== See also ==
- Ray Miron President's Cup
- 2010 Central Hockey League All-Star Game
- List of 2009–10 CHL Oakley Awards
