= Matt Case =

American ice hockey player

- Born: February 16, 1986 (age 39); Plymouth, Minnesota, U.S.
- Height: 5 ft 11 in (180 cm)
- Weight: 183 lb (83 kg; 13 st 1 lb)
- Position: Defense
- Shot: Right
- Played for: Norfolk Admirals; Texas Stars; Manchester Monarchs; Lillehammer IK
- NHL draft: Undrafted
- Playing career: 2010–2015

Matt Case (born February 16, 1986) is an American former professional ice hockey defenseman. He played in the North American minor-leagues and with Lillehammer IK of the GET-ligaen of Norway.

== Playing career ==
Case attended Ferris State University where he played college hockey with the Ferris State Bulldogs men's ice hockey team before turning professional with the Norfolk Admirals near the end of the 2009–10 AHL season.

On May 21, 2013, after three professional seasons in North America, Case signed a contract with European club, Lillehammer IK of the Norwegian GET-ligaen.

After a single season with Lillehammer, Case returned to the Idaho Steelheads on a one-year contract on August 1, 2014.

On May 22, 2015, Case signed for a second stint in Norway in agreeing to a one-year contract with the Sparta Warriors of the GET. Before making his debut with the Warriors, he opted to retire from professional hockey.

== Career statistics ==
			Regular season					Playoffs
Season	Team	League	GP	G	A	Pts	PIM	GP	G	A	Pts	PIM
2004–05	Fairbanks Ice Dogs	NAHL	55	3	11	14	52	3	0	0	0	5
2005–06	Green Bay Gamblers	USHL	60	3	9	12	74	—	—	—	—	—
2006–07	Ferris State University	NCAA	29	4	6	10	16	—	—	—	—	—
2007–08	Ferris State University	NCAA	37	1	7	8	51	—	—	—	—	—
2008–09	Ferris State University	NCAA	38	1	11	12	42	—	—	—	—	—
2009–10	Ferris State University	NCAA	40	4	13	17	30	—	—	—	—	—
2009–10	Norfolk Admirals	AHL	2	0	1	1	2	—	—	—	—	—
2010–11	Gwinnett Gladiators	ECHL	38	1	2	3	14	—	—	—	—	—
2010–11	Idaho Steelheads	ECHL	31	1	6	7	18	9	0	1	1	6
2011–12	Idaho Steelheads	ECHL	48	4	8	12	68	7	0	1	1	10
2011–12	Texas Stars	AHL	9	0	0	0	4	—	—	—	—	—
2012–13	Idaho Steelheads	ECHL	62	6	33	39	59	17	1	9	10	15
2012–13	Manchester Monarchs	AHL	5	0	0	0	4	—	—	—	—	—
2013–14	Lillehammer IK	Norway	45	7	12	19	34	12	1	2	3	45
2014–15	Idaho Steelheads	ECHL	65	2	21	23	65	—	—	—	—	—
AHL totals			16	0	1	1	10	—	—	—	—	—
ECHL totals			244	14	70	84	224	33	1	11	12	31

== Awards and honors ==
Award	Year
ECHL
First All-Star Team	2013
Performer of the Year (+32)	2013
