= List of 2009–10 CHL Oakley Awards =

The 2009–10 CHL Oakley Awards are the way the Central Hockey League denotes its players of the week and players of the month of the 2009–10 season.

== Weekly ==
Oakley CHL Player of the Week
Week	Player
October 19, 2009	Joe Guenther (Amarillo Gorillas)
October 26, 2009	Jeff Pierce (Odessa Jackalopes)
November 2, 2009	Rob Hisey (Tulsa Oilers)
November 9, 2009	Philippe Plante (Odessa Jackalopes)
November 16, 2009	T.J. Caig (Tulsa Oilers)
November 23, 2009	Grant Goeckner-Zoeller (Rio Grande Valley Killer Bees)
November 30, 2009	Justin Bowers (Allen Americans)
November 9, 2009	Philippe Plante (Odessa Jackalopes)
December 7, 2009	Louis Dumont (Mississippi RiverKings)
December 14, 2009	Brendon Hodge (Rapid City Rush)
December 21, 2009	Aaron Schneekloth (Colorado Eagles)
December 28, 2009	Jeff Christian (Missouri Mavericks)
January 4, 2010	David Nimmo (Amarillo Gorillas)
January 11, 2010	Ryan Bennett (Corpus Christi IceRays)
January 18, 2010	Elias Godoy (Texas Brahmas)
January 25, 2010	Darryl Smith (Laredo Bucks)
February 1, 2010	Chad Hinz (Arizona Sundogs)
February 8, 2010	Mike Ramsay (Odessa Jackalopes)
February 15, 2010	Simon Mangos (Bossier-Shreveport Mudbugs)
February 22, 2010	Chad Woollard (Corpus Christi IceRays)
March 1, 2010	Sylvain Deschatelets (Laredo Bucks)
March 8, 2010	Ed McGrane (Colorado Eagles)
March 15, 2010	Collin Circelli (Odessa Jackalopes)
March 22, 2010	Nino Musitelli (Allen Americans)

== Monthly ==
Oakley 3 Stars Award
Month	Player
October 2009	Riley Nelson (Colorado Eagles)
November 2009	T.J. Caig (Tulsa Oilers)
December 2009	David Nimmo (Amarillo Gorillas)
January 2010	Justin Bowers (Allen Americans)
February 2010	Brett Jaeger (Texas Brahmas)
March 2010	Ryan Held (Mississippi RiverKings)
