= Pat Curcio =

- Born: September 6, 1973 (age 53) Toronto, Ontario, Canada
- Height: 5 ft 10 in (178 cm)
- Weight: 190 lb (86 kg; 13 st 8 lb)
- Position: Right Wing
- Shot: Right
- Played for: Dayton Bombers; Charlotte Checkers; Huntsville Blast; Milan Devils; Wedemark Scorpions; Ravensburg EV; Hannover Scorpions; Bayreuth ESV
- Playing career: 1991–2002

Patrick Curcio (born September 6, 1973) is a Canadian-Italian professional ice hockey coach, executive and former professional ice hockey player. Pat is now a Partner with Optima World Sports

== Playing career ==
Curcio played professionally in the East Coast Hockey League for the Dayton Bombers, Charlotte Checkers and Huntsville Blast and in the Colonial Hockey League for the Saginaw Wheels and Brantford Smoke.

In 1995, Curcio signed with the HC Devils Milano of Italy and had stints in the Swiss NLB with SC Herisau and in Germany in the following years. He played a total of 133 games for the Hannover Scorpions in the German top-flight Deutsche Eishockey League (DEL) and spent time with German minor league teams EV Ravensburg and ESV Bayreuth.

== Coaching and managing career ==
He began his career behind the bench in 2001. In the 2006–07 season, he served as head coach of the Pickering Panthers of the Ontario Junior Hockey League. From 2007 to 2009, Curcio served as assistant coach of OHL's London Knights, followed by assistant coach stints with the Utah Grizzlies (ECHL) and the Sault Sainte Marie Greyhounds (OHL).

In 2009, he organized the Euro Can Cup in London, Ontario, that included teams like EV Zug of Switzerland, EHC München of Germany and EHC Linz of Austria.

He was the Founder, President, General Manager and Head Coach of the former San Francisco Bulls Professional Hockey Team. Curcio, along with his wife Elouise, brought professional hockey back to San Francisco, when they were granted a team in the ECHL in 2011. A year later, the Bulls debuted on October 12, 2012 to a capacity crowd of 8,277 at the Cow Palace. The Bulls were the farm team of the NHL San Jose Sharks. The Bulls folded on January 27, 2014.

In the 2014-15 campaign, he was the head coach of Hockey Milano Rossoblu in the Serie A in Italy. He started the 2015–16 season as head coach of fellow Italian Serie A team HC Valpellice, but left in November 2015 to take the position as assistant coach of HC Lugano in the Swiss top-tier National League A (NLA). Curcio was promoted to Associate coach in September 2016. He has helped the team advance to 3 finals in 2 years: 2 silver Medals at Spengler Cup and the NLA Championship finals in 2016. He and head coach Doug Shedden were sacked by HCL on January 16, 2017.

In June 2017, the Italian-based EBEL Team Hockey Club Bolzano hired Curcio as head coach for the 2016–2017 season. He parted company with the club in late November 2017.

Rehired in March 2018 by Hockey Club Bolzano to help sign the team for the 2018–2019 season as a special consultant to the GM, Curcio left the position in June 2018 to become a full time partner with Optima World Sports.

Pat Curcio is now a partner with Optima World Sports. For over 25 years, Optima has been representing Hockey Players in all of Europe, Asia and the KHL.

== Early career ==
=== Statistics ===
			Regular season					Playoffs
Season	Team	League	GP	G	A	Pts	PIM	GP	G	A	Pts	PIM
1991–92	Ottawa 67's	OHL	20	1	3	4	0	8	0	1	1	4
1992–93	Dallas Freeze	CHL	32	12	17	29	37	—	—	—	—	—
1992–93	Prince Albert Raiders	WHL	1	0	0	0	0	—	—	—	—	—
1993–94	Dayton Bombers	ECHL	11	1	2	3	5	—	—	—	—	—
1993–94	Charlotte Checkers	ECHL	3	1	0	1	0	—	—	—	—	—
1993–94	Huntsville Blast	ECHL	13	1	9	10	16	3	1	0	1	2
1994–95	Saginaw Wheels	CoHL	30	12	15	27	20	—	—	—	—	—
1994–95	Brantford Smoke	CoHL	10	1	3	4	4	—	—	—	—	—
1995–96	Milan Devils	Italy	32	12	39	51	28	—	—	—	—	—
1996–97	Wedemark Scorpions	DEL	25	2	8	10	16	—	—	—	—	—
1996–97	Ravensburg EV	Ger.1	20	9	14	23	61	—	—	—	—	—
1997–98	Hannover Scorpions	DEL	43	4	14	18	24	—	—	—	—	—
1998–99	Hannover Scorpions	DEL	47	3	13	16	65	—	—	—	—	—
2001–02	Bayreuth ESV	GerObL	4	0	3	3	0	—	—	—	—	—

== Coaching career overview ==
- 2003-2004 Wexford Raiders AAA Asst Coach
- 2004-2005 Wexford Raiders AAA Head Coach
- 2005-2006 Toronto Redwings AAA Head Coach
- 2006–2007 Pickering Panthers Head Coach (OPJHL)
- 2007–2008 London Knights) Asst Coach
- 2008–2009 London Knights (OHL)* Asst Coach
- 2009–2010 Utah Grizzlies (ECHL)Asst Coch
- 2010–2011 Sault Ste. Marie Greyhounds (OHL)Asst Coach
- 2012–2013 San Francisco Bulls GM/ Head Coach (ECHL) San Jose Sharks affiliate NHL
- 2013–2014 San Francisco Bulls GM/ Head Coach (ECHL) San Jose Sharks affiliate NHL
- 2014–2015 Hockey Milano Rossoblu Serie A Head Coach (voted by fans coach of the year)
- 2015 HC Valpellice Bulldogs (left Nov,1. 2015) Serie A Head Coach
- 2015-2016 HC Lugano NLA Asst. Coach
- 2016-2017 HC Lugano NLA Asst Coach
- 2017- current HC Bolzano EBEL Head Coach

== See also ==
- San Francisco Bulls
- Cow Palace
- London Knights
