= Aaron Schneekloth =

Canadian ice hockey player and coach

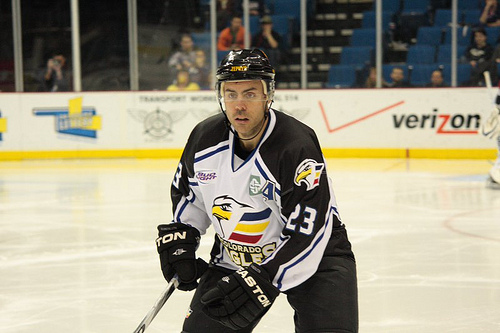
- Schneekloth with the Colorado Eagles in 2011
- Born: July 15, 1978 (age 48) Calgary, Alberta, Canada
- Height: 5 ft 11 in (180 cm)
- Weight: 185 lb (84 kg; 13 st 3 lb)
- Position: Defence
- Shot: Left
- Played for: Grand Rapids Griffins; Houston Aeros; Colorado Eagles
- NHL draft: Undrafted
- Playing career: 2001–2013

Aaron Schneekloth (born July 15, 1978) is a Canadian former professional ice hockey player who later moved into coaching within the Colorado Avalanche organization, serving as head coach of their American Hockey League affiliate. On June 17, 2025, he joined the Seattle Kraken as an assistant coach.

== Playing career ==
He is best known for his lengthy and impactful tenure with the Colorado Eagles, during which he competed in both the Central Hockey League (CHL) and later the ECHL after the franchise transitioned leagues. By the time he retired, he had cemented himself in the team's record books, ranking second in franchise history with an impressive 382 games played. Offensively, he was a key contributor from the blue line, finishing fifth all-time in total points with 356.

== Coaching career ==
After completing the 2012–13, his twelfth as a pro, Schneekloth announced his retirement from playing and, on August 23, 2013, transitioned into an assistant coaching position with the Eagles. He was elevated to head coach on July 18, 2016, and under his leadership the Eagles captured consecutive Kelly Cup championships in 2017 and 2018. When the team advanced to the American Hockey League (AHL) for the 2018–19 season, Schneekloth remained on staff, continuing with the Eagles as an assistant coach.

After head coach Greg Cronin departed the Colorado Eagles to accept a promotion to the NHL, Schneekloth was reappointed as the team's head coach on July 7, 2023.

On June 17, 2025, Schneekloth was officially appointed as an assistant coach for the NHL's Seattle Kraken.

== Career statistics ==
| | | | Regular season | | | | | Playoffs |
| Season | Team | League | GP | G | A | Pts | PIM | GP | G | A | Pts | PIM |
|---|---|---|---|---|---|---|---|---|---|---|---|---|
| 1996–97 | South Surrey Eagles | BCHL | — | — | — | — | — | — | — | — | — | — |
| 1998–99 | U. of North Dakota | WCHA | 35 | 2 | 4 | 6 | 14 | — | — | — | — | — |
| 1999–00 | U. of North Dakota | WCHA | 34 | 3 | 14 | 17 | 24 | — | — | — | — | — |
| 2000–01 | U. of North Dakota | WCHA | 46 | 6 | 14 | 20 | 36 | — | — | — | — | — |
| 2001–02 | U. of North Dakota | WCHA | 35 | 8 | 21 | 29 | 16 | — | — | — | — | — |
| 2001–02 | South Carolina Stingrays | ECHL | 9 | 1 | 5 | 6 | 8 | 1 | 0 | 0 | 0 | 0 |
| 2002–03 | South Carolina Stingrays | ECHL | 41 | 8 | 22 | 30 | 36 | 4 | 1 | 1 | 2 | 6 |
| 2002–03 | Grand Rapids Griffins | AHL | 2 | 0 | 0 | 0 | 0 | — | — | — | — | — |
| 2003–04 | Grand Rapids Griffins | AHL | 56 | 1 | 7 | 8 | 14 | — | — | — | — | — |
| 2004–05 | New Mexico Scorpions | CHL | 60 | 3 | 36 | 39 | 40 | — | — | — | — | — |
| 2005–06 | Austin Ice Bats | CHL | 59 | 16 | 27 | 43 | 79 | — | — | — | — | — |
| 2005–06 | Houston Aeros | AHL | 6 | 0 | 1 | 1 | 2 | — | — | — | — | — |
| 2006–07 | Colorado Eagles | CHL | 47 | 11 | 35 | 46 | 70 | 25 | 8 | 12 | 20 | 16 |
| 2007–08 | Colorado Eagles | CHL | 59 | 21 | 39 | 60 | 42 | 16 | 0 | 7 | 7 | 20 |
| 2008–09 | Colorado Eagles | CHL | 64 | 18 | 37 | 55 | 82 | 15 | 5 | 10 | 15 | 6 |
| 2009–10 | Colorado Eagles | CHL | 64 | 26 | 40 | 66 | 54 | 4 | 0 | 3 | 3 | 0 |
| 2010–11 | Colorado Eagles | CHL | 36 | 9 | 24 | 33 | 34 | 22 | 4 | 9 | 13 | 14 |
| 2011–12 | Colorado Eagles | ECHL | 72 | 20 | 42 | 62 | 50 | 3 | 0 | 0 | 0 | 0 |
| 2012–13 | Colorado Eagles | ECHL | 40 | 6 | 28 | 34 | 25 | 6 | 2 | 2 | 4 | 4 |
| ECHL totals | | | 152 | 35 | 97 | 132 | 119 | 14 | 3 | 3 | 6 | 10 |
| AHL totals | | | 64 | 9 | 8 | 17 | 16 | — | — | — | — | — |
| CHL totals | | | 389 | 104 | 238 | 342 | 401 | 82 | 17 | 41 | 58 | 57 |

== Awards and honours ==
| Award | Year |
|---|---|
CHL
| All-CHL Team | 2008 |
| All-CHL Team | 2009 |
| Most Outstanding Defenseman | 2009 |
| All-CHL Team | 2010 |
| Most Outstanding Defenseman | 2010 |
ECHL
| All-ECHL First Team | 2012 |
| Defenseman of the Year | 2012 |
