= Joel Martin =

American ice hockey player and coach

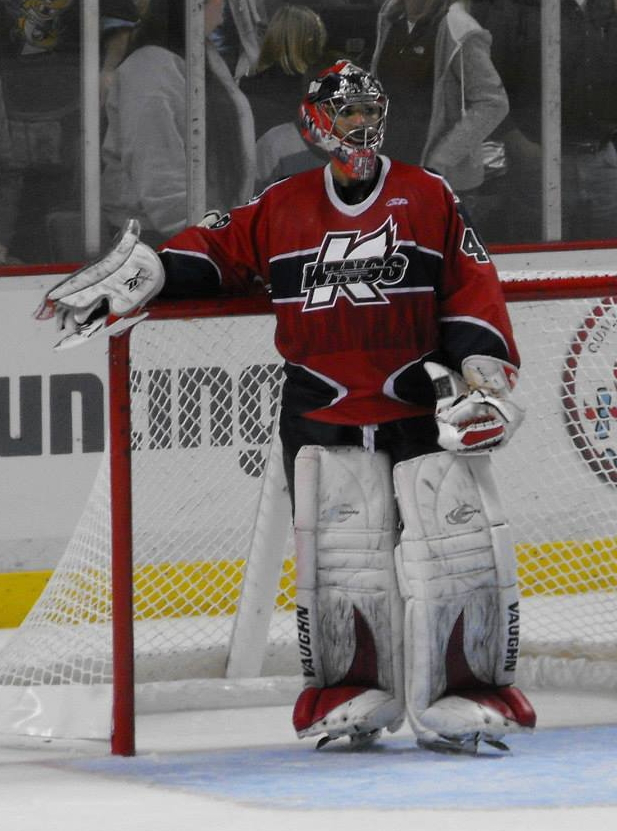
- Martin with the Kalamazoo Wings in 2012
- Born: April 22, 1982 (age 44) Fort Worth, Texas, U.S.
- Height: 6 ft 1 in (185 cm)
- Weight: 185 lb (84 kg; 13 st 3 lb)
- Position: Goaltender
- Caught: Left
- Played for: Cleveland Barons; Norfolk Admirals; Syracuse Crunch; Bridgeport Sound Tigers; Herlev Eagles; Iowa Wild; Kalamazoo Wings
- NHL draft: Undrafted
- Playing career: 2003–2018

Joel Martin (born April 22, 1982) is an American former professional ice hockey goaltender who is currently the head coach of the Kalamazoo Wings of the ECHL.

== Playing career ==
=== Junior ===
Martin played in the major junior Western Hockey League from 2000–03. In the 2000–01 season, Martin played 42 games for the Lethbridge Hurricanes and went 17–18–1. The following season, he played with the Hurricanes for 3 more games, before moving on to the Tri-City Americans for 37 games. In his 37 games as an American, he went 13–13–5. In the 2002–03 season, Martin moved to the Vancouver Giants where he played 26 games with a 10–12–2 record. Late in the '02–03 season, Martin switched teams to the Calgary Hitmen, ending his junior career with a 5–6–1 record.

=== Professional ===
==== West Coast Hockey League ====
Martin played three games for the Bakersfield Condors of the West Coast Hockey League (WCHL) in the 2002–03 season, and left them with a record of 1–2–0.

==== ECHL ====
Martin had a number of stints in the ECHL, the first of which was in the 2003–04 season with the Columbus Cottonmouths. Martin played 5 games with the Cottonmouths, and went 3–2–0.

Martin came back to the ECHL in the 2006–07 season when he played 32 games for the Trenton Titans, and went 12–15–2. He stayed in the league, but moved to the Elmira Jackals for the 2007–08 season, playing 49 games for the Jackals, with a record of 27–17–4. Martin started the 2008–09 season out in the ECHL with the Augusta Lynx, but left after 3 games with a record of 1–2–0.

==== United Hockey League ====
Martin played two seasons in the United Hockey League (UHL), both of which were with the Kalamazoo Wings. In the 2004–05 season, he went 17–8–1 in his 26 games, and in the 2005–06 season, played 52 games, going 36–12–4. Martin led his team to the playoffs in the 2005–06 season, and helped them to win the Colonial Cup. In his time at with the Kwings in the 2005–06 season, Martin had the highest save percentage with .921, and the lowest goals against average with 2.20. Martin won Goaltender of the Year for the UHL in the 2005–06 season.

==== International Hockey League ====
Martin played his first year in the International Hockey League (IHL) in the 2008–09 season for the Kalamazoo Wings, sharing ice time with Jason Tapp. His record was 19–12–1 in 36 games.

==== Central Hockey League ====
Martin played two seasons in the Central Hockey League (CHL), both with the Odessa Jackalopes. In the 2003–04 season, he had a 3–4–2 record in 10 games. In 2009–10, he led the Jackalopes with a record of 27–6–2 in 36 games.

==== American Hockey League ====
Martin has never played a full season for the American Hockey League, but he has been frequently called up by various AHL teams since the 2005–06 season. He has been called up for a total of 4 games, and has gone 2–1–0. He has been called up to Milwaukee, Grand Rapids, Cleveland, Norfolk, and Syracuse, but only logged time with the last three. He started the 2010–11 season in the AHL with the Bridgeport Sound Tigers.

On February 4, 2011, Martin was signed by the New York Islanders to a one-year, two-way (NHL/AHL) standard professional contract, and he was assigned to play with the Bridgeport Sound Tigers. He was called up as an emergency replacement on February 8, 2011 after Kevin Poulin got injured during the pregame skate. He was unable to make it for the start of the game and arrived at the arena well after puck drop.

==== Playoffs ====
Martin has led his team to the playoffs four times. First he led the Kalamazoo Wings to the playoffs in 2004–05. He had a 2–1 record in the 2004–05 playoffs, but the Kwings were defeated. Martin led the K-wings to the playoffs again in the 2005–06 season and led the Wings to a 12–1 record, winning the Colonial Cup. Martin led the Trenton Titans to the playoffs in the 2006–07 season, as well as the Elmira Jackals in the 2007–08 season, but saw success in neither. He led the Odessa Jackalopes to the CHL's Southern Conference Final, losing in the seventh game to the Allen Americans.

== Records ==
Martin set the United Hockey League Record for most shutouts in a season with 9, as well as most goaltender wins in a single season with 36.

== Awards and honors ==
Award	Year
UHL Goaltender of the Year	2005–06
CHL All-Star Game MVP	2009–10
All-CHL Team	2009–10
CHL Most Outstanding Goaltender	2009–10
