= Danny Battochio =

Canadian ice hockey player

- Born: December 21, 1985 (age 40) Lively, Ontario, Canada
- Height: 5 ft 9 in (175 cm)
- Weight: 179 lb (81 kg; 12 st 11 lb)
- Position: Goaltender
- Caught: Left
- Played for: Rapid City Rush; Beibarys Atyrau
- NHL draft: Undrafted
- Playing career: 2009–2016

Danny Battochio (born December 21, 1985) is a Canadian former professional ice hockey goaltender. He retired playing with the Rapid City Rush of the ECHL and is a goalie consultant.

== Playing career ==
Battochio played major junior hockey with the Ottawa 67's of the Ontario Hockey League (OHL) where he was twice selected to receive the Roger Neilson Memorial Award as the OHL's top academic College/University player, and also winning the Bobby Smith Trophy as the OHL Scholastic Player of the Year for the 2005–06 season.

Battochio then attended St. Francis Xavier University where he played Canadian Interuniversity Sport (CIS) hockey within the Atlantic University Sport (AUS) conference. He was recognized for his outstanding play when he was named to the 2008-09 AUS Second All-Star Team.

Battochio turned professional with the 2009–10 Rapid City Rush of the Central Hockey League (CHL), where as a rookie he helped his team capture the Ray Miron President's Cup as the 2009–10 CHL champions. He was also selected as the CHL's Rookie of the Year and was named to the 2009–10 CHL All-Rookie Team.

In June 2013, Battochio was signed by the Beibarys Atyrau to play the 2013–14 season in Kazakhstan.

After a solid season with Atyrau, Battochio opted to return to his original club, the Rapid City Rush on a one-year deal on August 21, 2014.

== Awards and honours ==
Award	Year
Roger Neilson Memorial Award	2004–05
Roger Neilson Memorial Award	2005–06
Bobby Smith Trophy	2005–06
AUS Second All-Star Team	2008–09
Ray Miron President's Cup (with Rapid City Rush)	2009–10
CHL Rookie of the Year	2009–10

== Personal life ==
As of 2022, Battochio works in a mortgage brokerage in America.
