= San Francisco Bulls =

Minor ice hockey team

- City: Daly City, California
- League: ECHL
- Conference: Western
- Division: Pacific
- Founded: 2011
- Folded: 2014
- Home arena: Cow Palace
- Colors: Old Gold, Orange, Black, White
- Mascot: Rawhide
- Owners: Pat and Elouise Curcio (Utah Sports Management); Angela Batinovich; Shmuel Farhi (Farhi Holdings); Peter Higley (Pickle Barrel)
- General manager: Pat Curcio
- Head coach: Pat Curcio
- Media: San Francisco Chronicle; The San Francisco Examiner; Comcast Hometown Network; KNBR
- Affiliates: San Jose Sharks (NHL); Worcester Sharks (AHL)

Franchise history
- 2012–2014: San Francisco Bulls

The San Francisco Bulls were a professional minor ice hockey team of the ECHL located in Daly City, California, serving the San Francisco Bay Area market. They were an affiliate to the San Jose Sharks of the National Hockey League and the Worcester Sharks of the American Hockey League.

== History ==
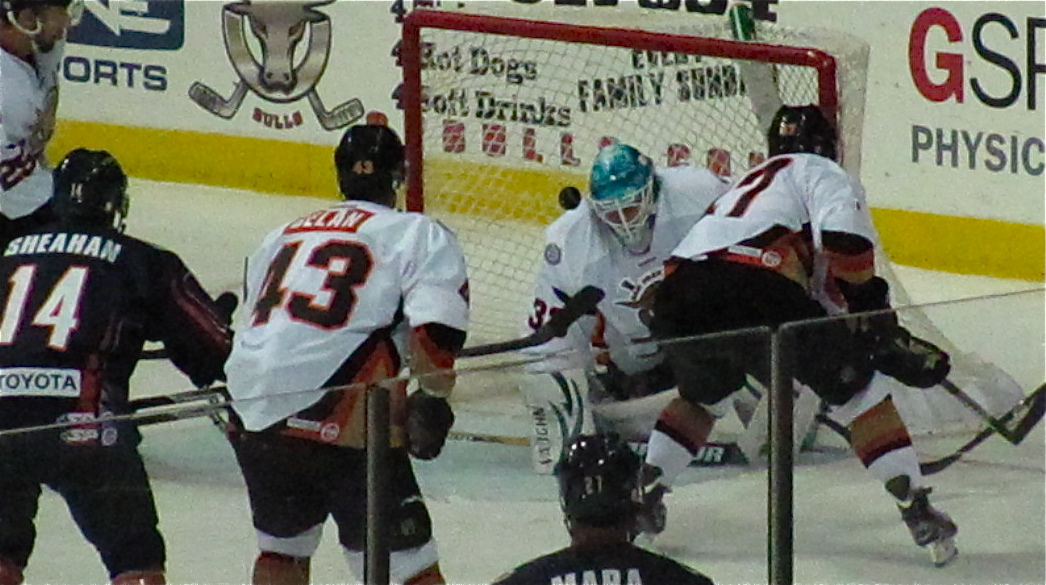
Goaltender Thomas Heemskerk on November 10, 2012, at the Cow Palace

Beginning with the 2012–13 season, the Bulls played their home games at the Cow Palace (former home of their NHL affiliate, the San Jose Sharks), which is right on the Daly City/San Francisco border. To accommodate the Bulls, the team spent $2 million installing a new ice system and a custom-made 360-degree wraparound LED video scoreboard with its game presentation system and ten sets of speaker arrays. The center hung video board has a 360 degree view for game presentation and full timekeeping and statistics. The new Colosseo Cube scoreboard had to be custom built by Colosseo USA because of the weight limitations on the 71-year-old building's roof. The Cow Palace made steel support beams and installed them in the rafters to help provide the additional support.

On July 11, 2012, the National Hockey League's San Jose Sharks announced that they had entered into an affiliation agreement with the Bulls. The Bulls were the first ice hockey team to represent San Francisco since the San Francisco Spiders of the International Hockey League played only the 1995-96 season before folding. The team made its debut on October 12, 2012, with a 4-3 loss to the Bakersfield Condors in front of a capacity crowd of 8,277 at the Cow Palace. They finished the regular season eighth in the Western Conference with 25 wins, 38 losses, 2 overtime losses, and 7 shootout losses, falling four games to one to the top-seeded Alaska Aces in the first round of the Kelly Cup playoffs.

Due to the 2012–13 NHL lockout, Minnesota Wild forward Torrey Mitchell, who was a former San Jose Shark, signed a standard contract with the Bulls on December 31, 2012. He played his first official game as a Bull two days later and scored the only regulation goal for the team in a 2-1 shootout loss at home.

On January 20, 2014, the San Francisco Chronicle reported that the Bulls might fold or move the next week. The team folded on January 27, 2014. At the time of their folding, the Bulls were eighth in the Western Conference with 15 wins, 20 losses, 4 overtime losses, and 1 shootout loss, and had a next-to-last attendance average of 2,292 fans per game (eclipsing only the Wheeling Nailers). San Francisco was the third team in ECHL history to fold mid-season after the Augusta Lynx and Fresno Falcons, both of which folded during the 2008–09 season.

== Final roster ==
Updated April 2, 2014.

No.	Nat	Player	Pos	S/G	Age	Acquired	Birthplace	Contract
13	(United States)	Travis Teffs	C	R	35	2012	Hayward, California	Bulls
	(Canada)	Tyler Beskorowany	G	R	36	2013	Sudbury, Ontario	Bulls
	(Canada)	Paul Chiasson	F	R	36	2013	Toronto, Ontario	Bulls
44	(Canada)	Brett Findlay	LW	L	33	2013	Echo Bay, Ontario	Bulls
	(Canada)	Luke Judson	RW	R	35	2013	Emo, Ontario	Bulls
	(Canada)	Josh Kidd	D	R	37	2013	Sundridge, Ontario	Bulls
47	(Canada)	Dylan King	D	L	36	2012	Thessalon, Ontario	Bulls
	(Canada)	Daniel Maggio	D	R	35	2013	Windsor, Ontario	Bulls
	(United States)	Anthony Perdicaro	C	L	37	2013	East Rockaway, New York	Bulls
