= Chicago Express =

- City: Hoffman Estates, Illinois
- League: ECHL
- Conference: Eastern
- Division: North
- Operated: 2011–2012
- Home arena: Sears Centre
- Colors: Navy, Gray, Sky Blue
- Owner: Craig Drecktrah
- Head coach: Steve Martinson
- Affiliates: Columbus Blue Jackets (NHL) Springfield Falcons (AHL)

Franchise history
- 2011–2012: Chicago Express

The Chicago Express were a professional ice hockey team located in Hoffman Estates, Illinois, serving the Chicago market. The Express were a member of the North Division of the ECHL's Eastern Conference. The team played its home games at the Sears Centre.

The Express were owned by Craig Drecktrah, who formerly owned the United Hockey League's Chicago Hounds and Rockford IceHogs.

It was announced on July 13, 2011 that the Express would be affiliated with the NHL's Columbus Blue Jackets and the AHL's Springfield Falcons.

On April 6, 2012, it was announced that the Chicago Express would cease operations due to poor attendance numbers and lack of support. The Express finished last in the league for average attendance with 2,508. On some nights, the Express, which also had AHL and NHL competition in the same market, was struggling to get 1,000 spectators at its games.

== Team history ==
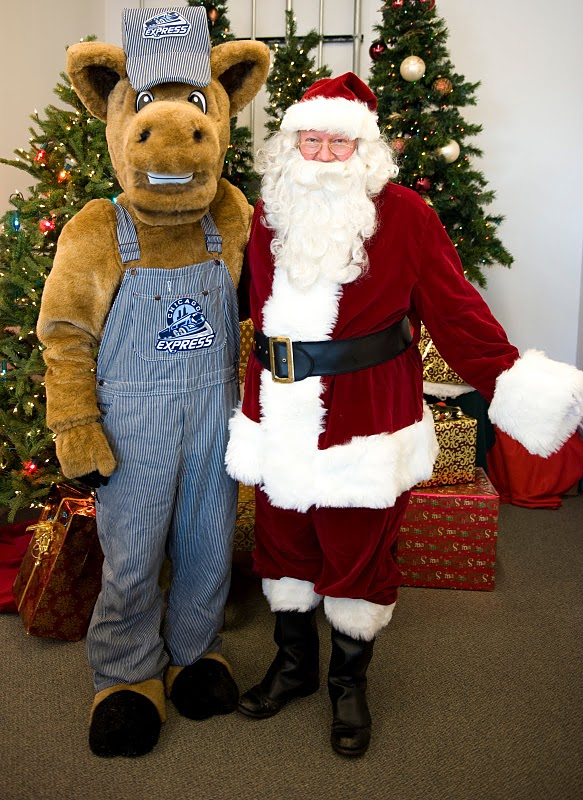
Express mascot Traxx the horse (left)

=== Inception ===
The team formed out of talks between owner Craig Drecktrah and officials at the Sears Centre. On the heels of the Chicago Hounds folding in 2009 after only playing one season (2006–07) at the Sears Centre, Drecktrah worked with arena and Hoffman Estates village officials to bring in an ECHL franchise. The league approved the franchise's application at the ECHL's annual Board of Governors Meeting in June 2010.

=== Team name ===
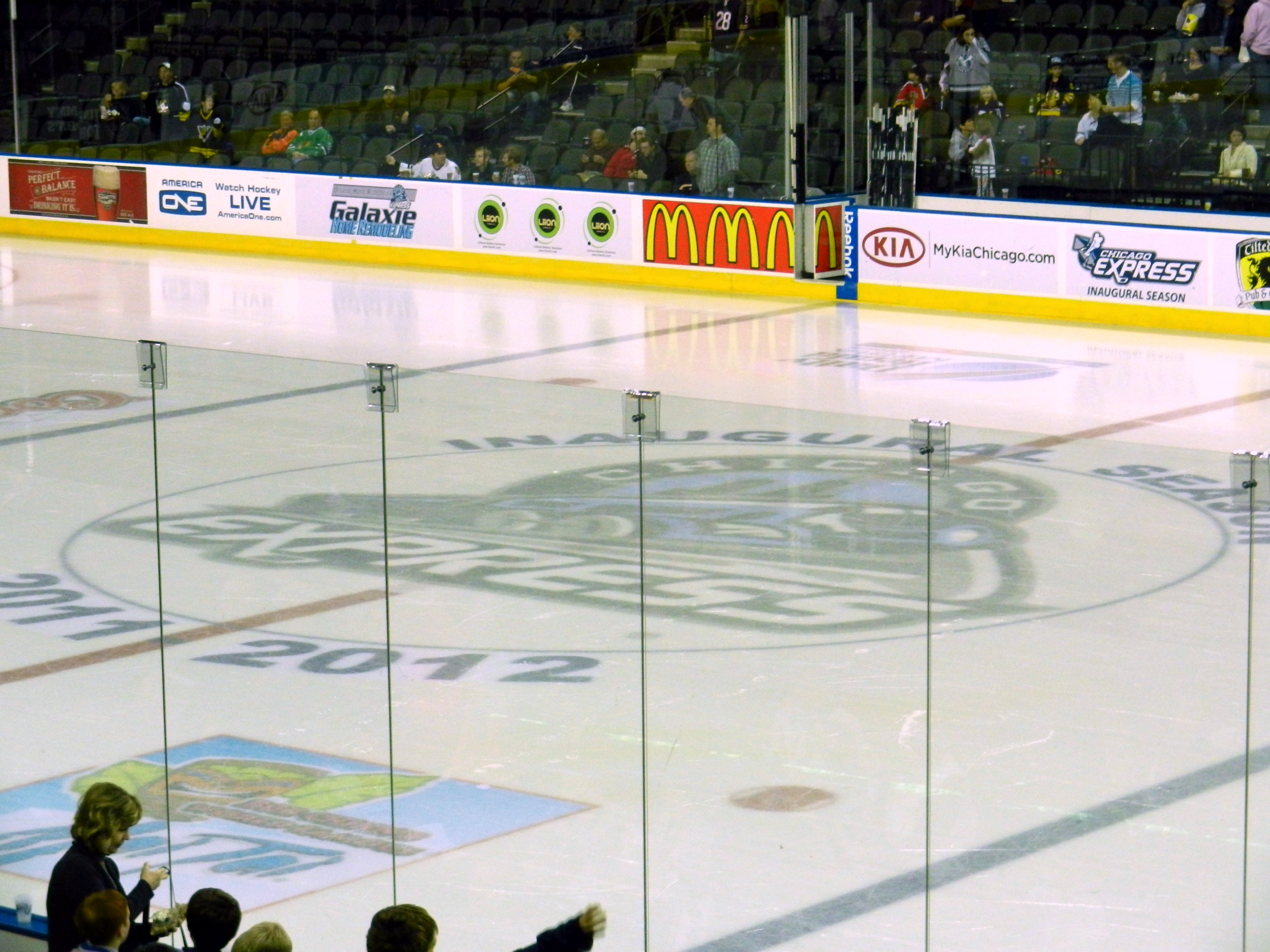
Express center ice logo during their first and only ECHL season in 2011-12

To name the new franchise, the team held a special name the team contest that eventually received over a thousand unique name suggestions. On July 22, the four finalists for the team name were unveiled. They were the Chicago Blizzard, Hoffman Estates Hammers, Chicago Knights and Chicago Express. Voting for the team's name closed on August 4, with Express announced as the winner on September 21. The final four portion of the contest received a total of 20,000 votes.

=== 2011–2012 season ===
Under the direction of Steve Martinson, the Express finished with a record of 34-26-8-4, good enough for 80 points and second place in the North Division, four points behind the division leading Kalamazoo Wings. However, this was only good enough for ninth in Eastern Conference. They were actually tied with the eighth place Reading Royals points wise, however they missed out on the playoffs because the Royals had more wins.

=== The Express fold ===
At the end of the season, the Express folded outright. There were a myriad of reason for this. Firstly, the Express could not hope to compete with the Chicago Blackhawks (NHL) and the Chicago Wolves (AHL). The team had no radio and television deals, and were not promoted on those mediums. The team also had a hard time drawing fans to Hoffman Estates from the heart of the city.

== Mascot ==
The mascot for the Chicago Express was "Traxx" the Horse.

== Players ==
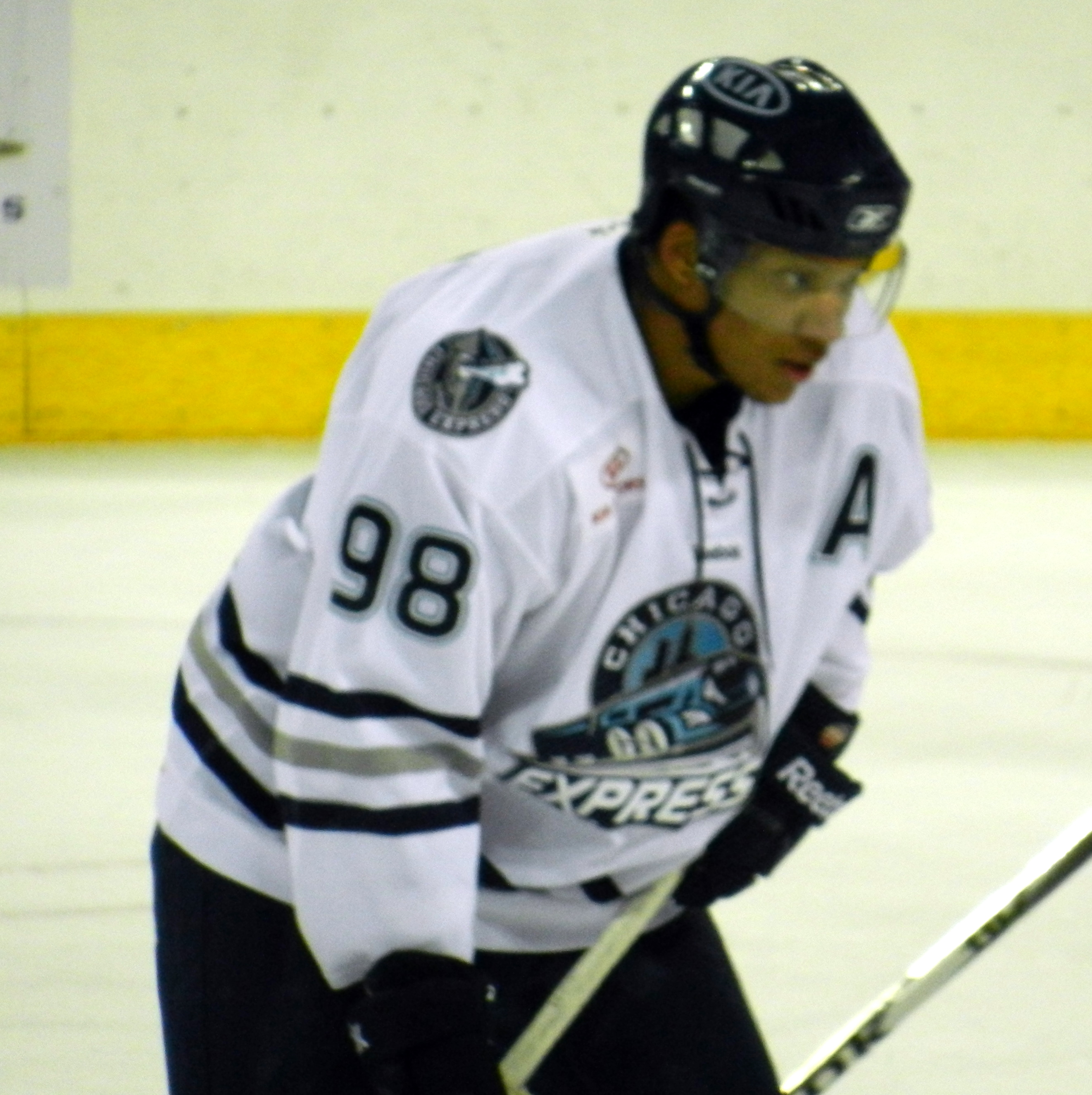
Chaz Johnson finished as Chicago's all-time leader in goals scored with 20.

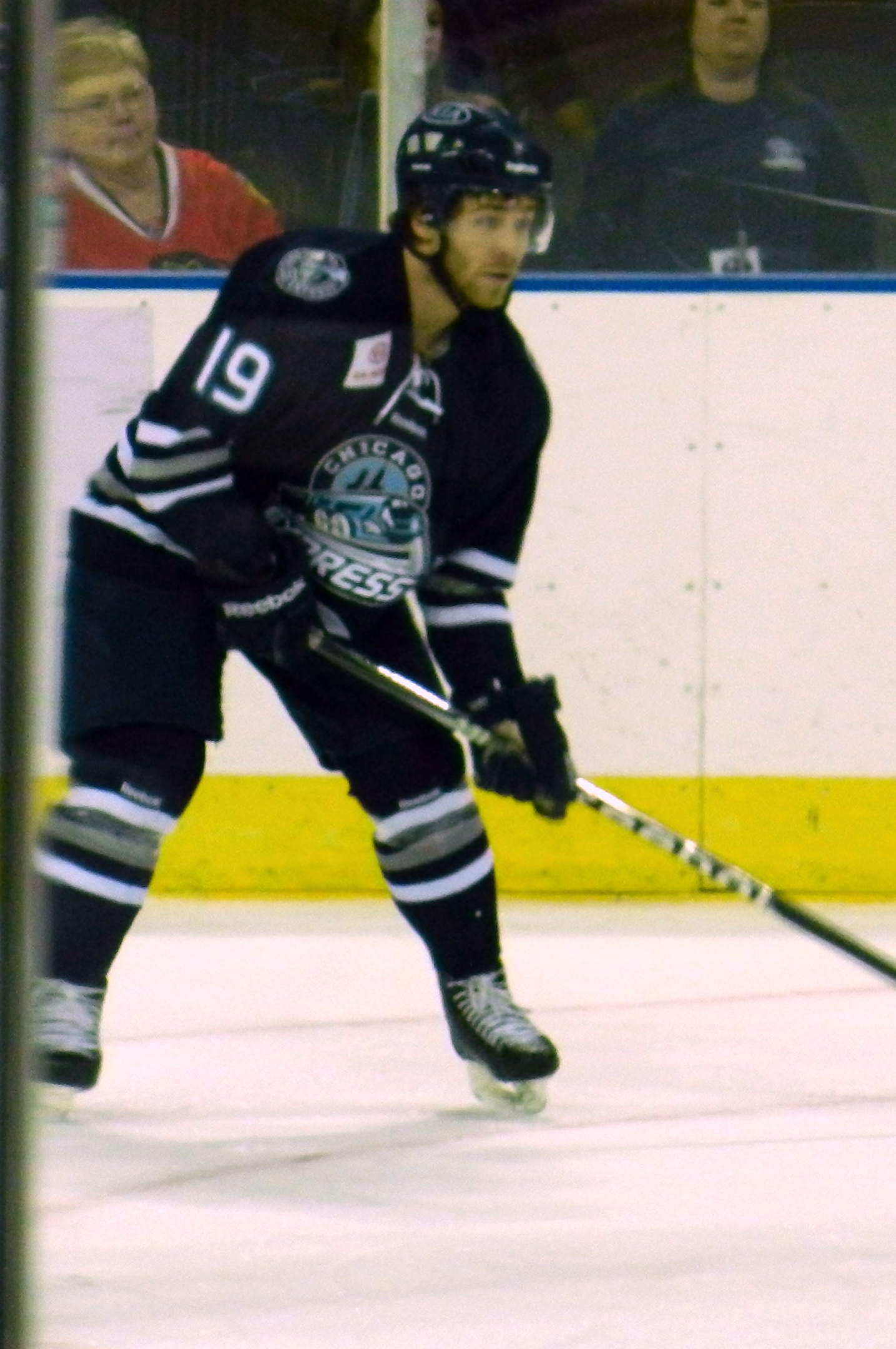
Tyler Donati led the Express with 47 assists and 61 points.

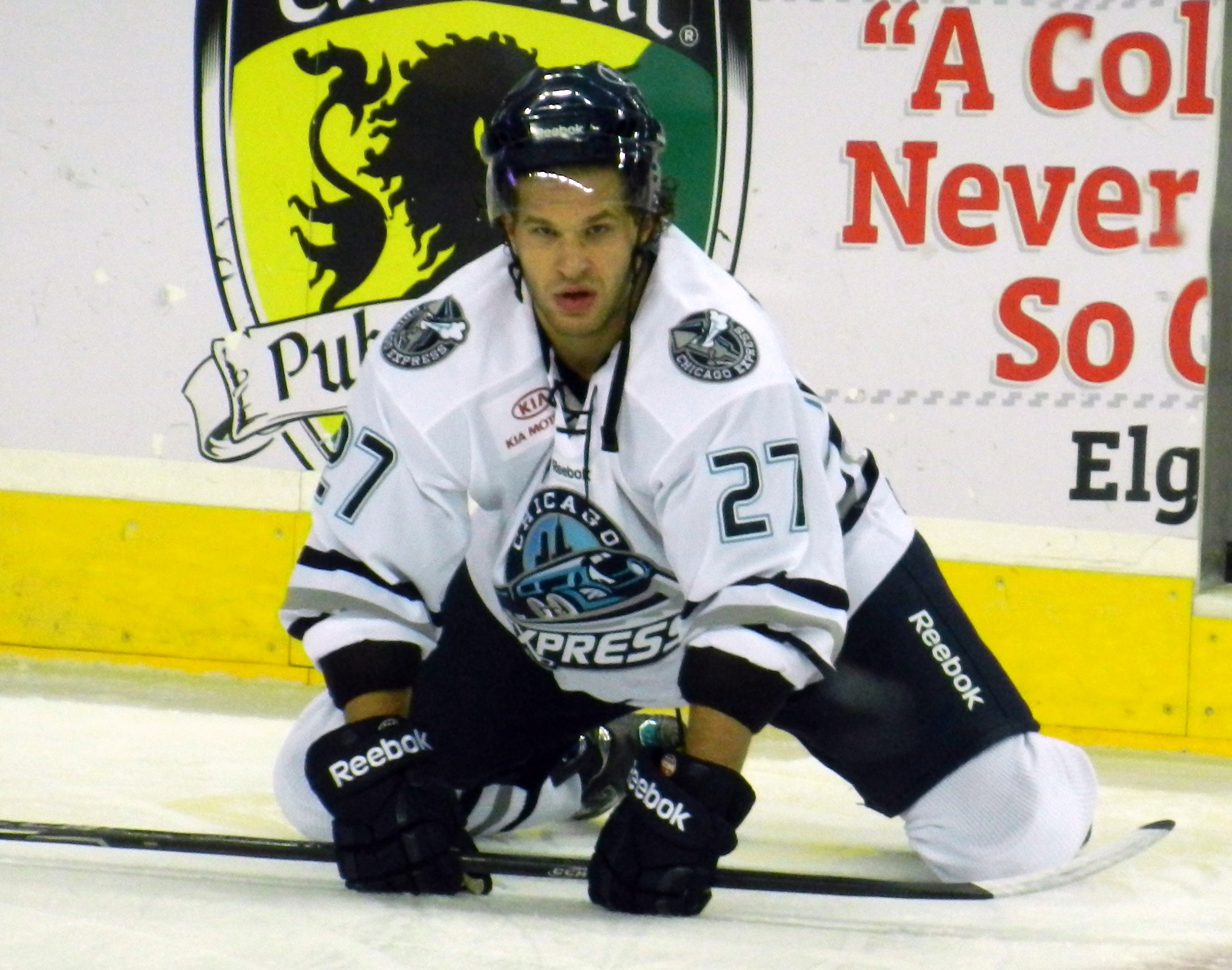
Devin DiDiomete was the Express' all-time leader in penalty minutes.

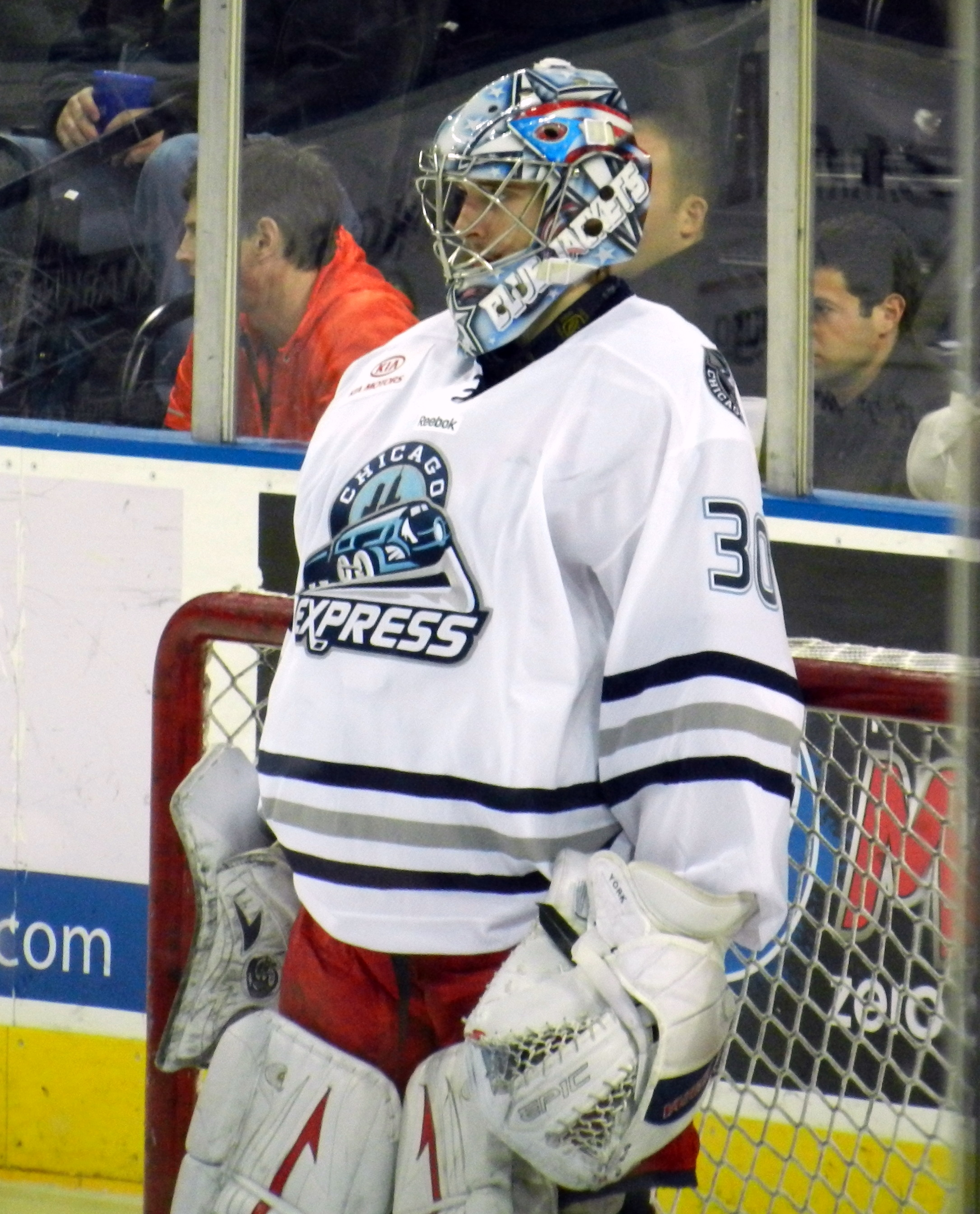
Allen York played for both the Express and the NHL's Columbus Blue Jackets in the 2011–12 season.

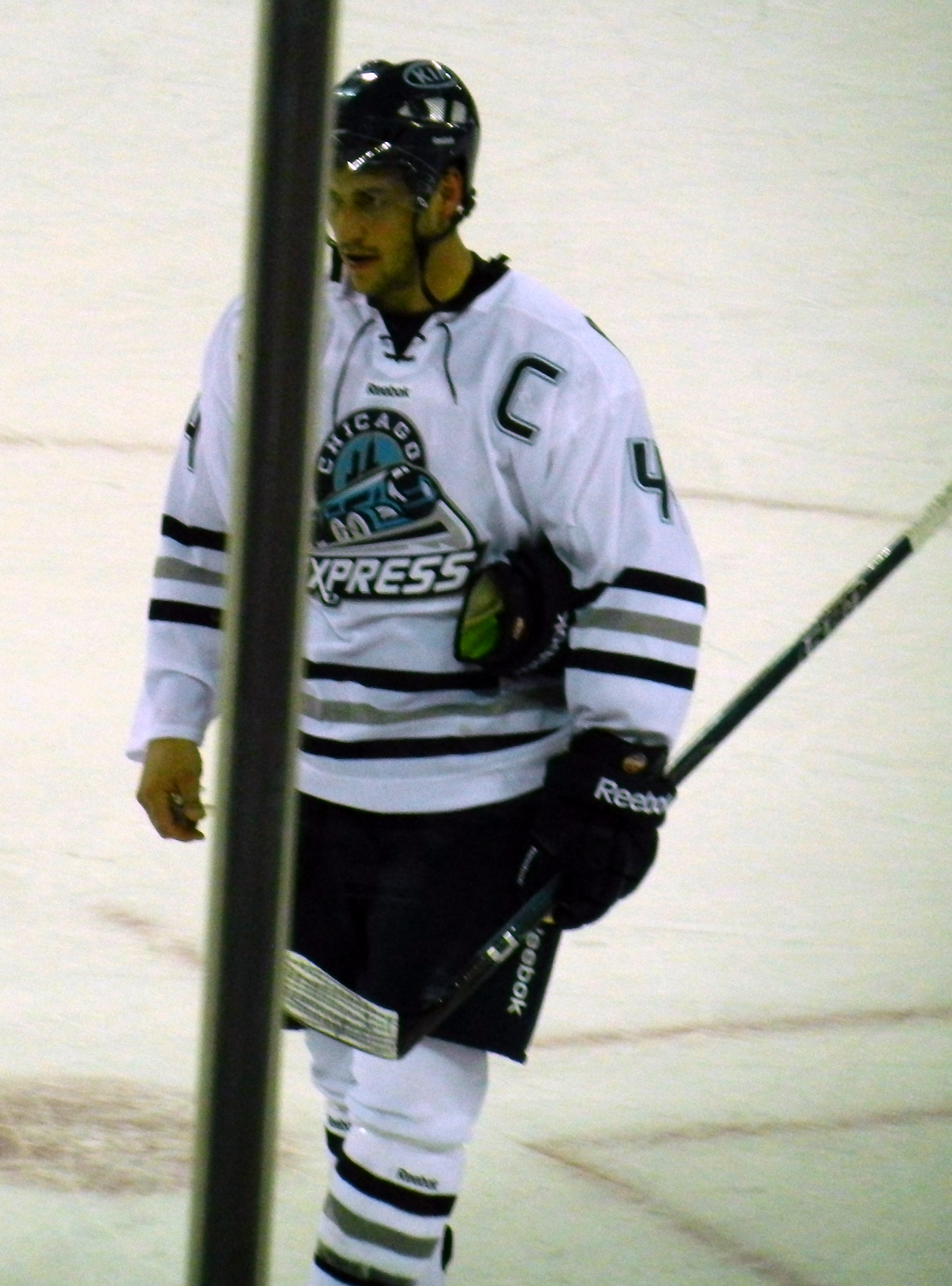
Nathan Lutz was the captain of the Express.

Skaters

Player	#	Pos	GP	G	A	Pts	PIM
Drew Akins	20	F	16	1	0	1	13
Josh Burrows	4	D	43	3	8	11	25
Darcy Campbell	6	D	61	8	29	37	87
Joe Cucci	14	C	14	1	4	5	11
Steven Delisle	5	D	38	1	3	4	20
Devin DiDiomete	27	LW	41	11	16	27	277
Tyler Donati	19	RW	46	14	47	61	29
Taylor Ellington	4	D	17	5	6	11	14
Mike Embach	16	F	60	13	13	26	41
Pierre-Luc Faubert	72	RW	72	19	25	44	70
Matt Gingera	26	F	6	1	0	1	2
Ryley Grantham	71	F	19	6	5	11	75
Maxime Gratchev	93	F	27	8	20	28	38
Dan Henningson	12	D	27	1	2	3	10
Chaz Johnson	98	RW	64	20	15	35	132
Tyler Johnson	18	C	20	3	3	6	8
Scott Lehman	7	D	11	0	2	2	7
Nathan Lutz	44	D	72	6	7	13	121
Anthony Maiani	7	F	39	4	14	18	10
Aaron Marvin	17	C	65	11	27	38	49
Kyler Moje	15	F	2	0	0	0	0
Brett Motherwell	42	D	25	0	8	8	20
Kyle Ostrow	9	F	59	11	20	31	23
Chad Painchaud	27	LW	27	11	11	22	29
Trent Palm	5	D	4	0	0	0	0
Danick Paquette	20	F	13	7	4	11	27
Drew Paris	2	D	22	3	6	9	10
Blair Riley	22	LW	15	7	9	16	8
Bobby Robins	25	F	28	7	8	15	123
Tony Romano	15	C	3	0	0	0	0
Johan Ryd	26	F	3	0	0	0	0
Tim Spencer	21	F	8	0	1	1	42
Evan Stephens	24	D	48	3	16	19	22
Mike Thomas	7	F	2	0	0	0	4
Yannick Tifu	10	C	17	3	8	11	19
Matt Tomassoni	24	D	3	0	0	0	0
Scott Wietecha	3	D	54	14	13	27	69
Jonathan Zion	8	D	40	10	15	25	29

Goaltenders

Player	#	GP	MIN	W	L	OTL	GAA	SV%	SO
Paul Dainton	31	18	794	6	3	2	3.25	.896	1
Rob Madore	31	12	722	8	3	1	2.41	.926	1
Peter Mannino	31	22	1334	10	8	2	3.15	.899	1
Rob Nolan	47	16	844	6	8	1	2.99	.896	0
Brooks Ostergard	47	1	65	0	0	1	4.65	.844	0
Allen York	30	11	604	4	4	1	3.28	.892	0

All player statistics taken from the ECHL.com.

=== Team captain ===
- Nathan Lutz, 2011–12
