= Kevin Ulanski =

American ice hockey player (born 1982)

- Born: May 19, 1982 (age 43) Madison, Wisconsin, U.S.
- Height: 5 ft 11 in (180 cm)
- Weight: 190 lb (86 kg; 13 st 8 lb)
- Position: Forward
- Shot: Left
- Played for: Albany River Rats; Milwaukee Admirals
- NHL draft: Undrafted
- Playing career: 2004–2016

Kevin Ulanski (born May 19, 1982) is an American professional ice hockey player.

He played for the Colorado Eagles in the Central Hockey League during the 2010–11 CHL season. Ulanski ranks 5th on the team's all-time scoring list with 288 points (93–195–288) in 193 games (1.5 points-per-game). In 2009–10, he won the CHL's scoring title with 109 of those points, becoming just the second Eagles player to top the 100-point plateau in a season.

A former standout at the University of Denver, where he played between 2001–2005 and won back-to-back NCAA championships, Ulanski has found great success in the past when paired with Eagles captain Riley Nelson. In their three seasons together—in addition to helping each other win successive CHL MVP awards—they have combined for 557 points (an average of 93 points per player, per season).

Ulanski did not start the 2011–12 season, although he was arguably the best player on the team, or even the league, as he needed to stay in Greeley in order to make a living. However, on Saturday 26 November 2011, Kevin Ulanski re-signed with the team, who are now in the ECHL. During that game he netted one goal and provided one assist as the Colorado Eagles beat the Idaho Steelheads 6–3.

== Awards and honors ==
| Award | Year |
|---|---|
| All-CHL Team | 2008–09 |
| CHL Most Valuable Player | 2009–10 |
| Joe Burton Award (CHL Scoring Champion) | 2009–10 |
