= 2011–12 ECHL season =

Ice hockey league season

- League: ECHL
- Sport: Ice hockey
- Duration: October 4, 2011 – March 31, 2012
- Total attendance: 3,082,764 (total); 4,282 (average)

Regular season
- Brabham Cup: Alaska Aces
- Season MVP: Chad Costello
- Top scorer: Dustin Gazley

Playoffs
- Eastern champions: Florida Everblades
- Eastern runners-up: Kalamazoo Wings
- Western champions: Las Vegas Wranglers
- Western runners-up: Alaska Aces
- Playoffs MVP: John Muse

Kelly Cup
- Champions: Florida Everblades
- Runners-up: Las Vegas Wranglers

ECHL seasons
- 2010–11 2012–13

The 2011–12 ECHL season was the 24th season of the ECHL. The regular season schedule ran from October 4, 2011 to March 31, 2012 and was followed by the 2012 Kelly Cup playoffs beginning on April 2, 2012.

== League business ==
=== Team changes ===
Following the loss of the Victoria Salmon Kings at the end of the 2010–11 season, the league welcomed as its 19th and 20th teams, the Chicago Express, who played home games at the Sears Centre in Hoffman Estates, Illinois and the Colorado Eagles, who moved to the ECHL from the Central Hockey League and played home games at the Budweiser Events Center in Loveland, Colorado. Chicago played in the North Division of the Eastern Conference and Colorado played in the Mountain Division of the Western Conference.

On July 6, 2011 the New Jersey Devils announced that the Trenton Devils were suspending operations immediately, citing a desire to restructure their player development system to more closely mirror those of other NHL franchises. New Jersey was the only NHL team to wholly own its ECHL affiliate. Trenton had failed to qualify for the playoffs for three out of the previous four seasons and had regularly posted league-low attendance numbers. Prior to folding, the team lost $1.5 million during the 2010–11 ECHL season. Later on July 27, an announcement was made that a Trenton franchise would re-enter the ECHL for the 2011–12 season as the Trenton Titans, with a press conference officially announcing the team occurring on July 28. The ECHL Board of Governors announced on July 28 that the Titans' membership application had been approved. The team took over the Trenton Devils' place in the Eastern Conference's Atlantic Division and played according to the Devils' original schedule for the 2011–12 season.

=== Annual Board of Governors meeting ===
The league's annual Board of Governors meeting concluded on August 1, 2011. Announcements included the re-election of Steve Chapman, president of the Gwinnett Gladiators as board president; adoption by the league of an attainable icing rule similar to that employed by the NHL and the league re-alignment for the 2011–12 season. The Colorado Eagles joined the Western Conference's Mountain Division, while in the Eastern Conference, the Wheeling Nailers moved to the Atlantic Division and the Chicago Express occupied the North Division spot left vacant by the Nailers. The league also announced that no All-Star game would be conducted during the 2011–12 season.

=== 2012 Kelly Cup Playoffs format ===
The format for the 2011 Kelly Cup Playoffs remained unchanged from the previous season.

In the Eastern Conference, postseason berths were awarded to the first-place team in each division and the next five teams in the conference, based on points. The division winners were seeded first, second and third and played the eighth-place finisher, the seventh-place finisher and the sixth-place finisher, respectively, while the fourth-place finisher and the fifth-place finisher met. The conference semifinals had the winner of the first-place and eighth-place matchup meet the winner of the fourth-place and fifth-place game while the winner of the second-place and seventh-place game faced the winner of the third-place and sixth-place matchup.

In the Western Conference, postseason berths were awarded to the first-place team in each division and the next five teams in the conference, based on points. The division winner with the best record in the conference received a bye in the first round. The other division winner was seeded second and met the team that finished seventh in the conference in the first round. The other first round matchups were the third-place finisher in the conference against the sixth-place finisher in the conference and the fourth-place finisher in the conference against the fifth-place finisher in the conference. The conference semifinals had the first-place finisher meet the winner of the fourth-place and fifth-place matchup and the winner of the second-place finisher and seventh-place finisher against the winner of the third-place finisher and the sixth-place finisher.

The first round in each Conference was a best of five series with each subsequent round being a best of seven series.

== Regular season ==
=== Standings ===
==== By division ====
End of season standings
Eastern Conference

Atlantic Division
		GP	W	L	OTL	SOL	GF	GA	Pts
1	Elmira Jackals (ANA/OTT)	72	45	22	2	3	228	204	95
2	Wheeling Nailers (MTL/PIT)	72	37	26	4	5	219	202	83
3	Reading Royals (TOR)	72	36	28	4	4	229	235	80
4	Trenton Titans (PHI)	72	21	41	4	6	211	271	52

North Division
		GP	W	L	OTL	SOL	GF	GA	Pts
1	Kalamazoo Wings (independent)	72	38	26	2	6	264	237	84
2	Chicago Express (CBJ)	72	34	26	8	4	216	234	80
3	Cincinnati Cyclones (FLA/NAS)	72	35	28	2	7	228	227	79
4	Toledo Walleye (CHI/DET)	72	28	38	2	4	189	258	48

South Division
		GP	W	L	OTL	SOL	GF	GA	Pts
1	Gwinnett Gladiators (PHX)	72	41	20	7	4	214	200	93
2	Greenville Road Warriors (NYR)	72	41	25	2	4	232	215	88
3	Florida Everblades (Car/TB)	72	39	26	2	5	260	218	85
4	South Carolina Stingrays (Was)	72	37	28	4	3	191	180	81

Western Conference

Mountain Division
		GP	W	L	OTL	SOL	GF	GA	Pts
1	Alaska Aces (STL)	72	43	18	3	8	224	172	97
2	Colorado Eagles (independent)	72	38	28	1	5	250	252	82
3	Utah Grizzlies (CGY)	72	33	33	0	6	183	223	72
4	Idaho Steelheads (DAL)	72	31	32	2	7	194	236	71

Pacific Division
		GP	W	L	OTL	SOL	GF	GA	Pts
1	Ontario Reign (LA)	72	43	21	5	3	242	193	94
2	Las Vegas Wranglers (independent)	72	42	22	1	7	235	198	92
3	Stockton Thunder (EDM/SJ)	72	34	33	1	4	204	216	73
4	Bakersfield Condors (independent)	72	24	41	4	3	199	241	55

==== By conference ====
End of season standings

Eastern Conference
R		Div	GP	W	L	OTL	SOL	GF	GA	Pts
1	z – Elmira Jackals *	AT	72	45	22	2	3	228	204	95
2	y – Gwinnett Gladiators *	SO	72	41	20	7	4	214	200	93
3	y – Kalamazoo Wings *	NO	72	38	26	2	6	264	237	84
4	Greenville Road Warriors	SO	72	41	25	2	4	232	215	88
5	Florida Everblades	SO	72	39	26	2	5	260	218	85
6	Wheeling Nailers	AT	72	37	26	4	5	219	202	83
7	South Carolina Stingrays	SO	72	37	28	4	3	191	180	81
8	Reading Royals	AT	72	36	28	4	4	229	235	80
8.5
9	Chicago Express	NO	72	34	26	8	4	216	234	80
10	Cincinnati Cyclones	NO	72	35	28	2	7	228	227	79
11	Toledo Walleye	NO	72	28	38	2	4	189	258	62
12	Trenton Titans	AT	72	21	41	4	6	211	271	52

Divisions: AT – Atlantic, NO – North, SO – South

* – Division leader; y – Won division; z – Won conference (and division)

Western Conference
R		Div	GP	W	L	OTL	SOL	GF	GA	Pts
1	b – Alaska Aces *	MT	72	43	18	3	8	224	172	97
2	y – Ontario Reign *	PA	72	43	21	5	3	242	193	94
3	Las Vegas Wranglers	PA	72	42	22	1	7	235	198	92
4	Colorado Eagles	MT	72	38	28	1	5	250	252	82
5	Stockton Thunder	PA	72	34	33	1	4	204	216	73
6	Utah Grizzlies	MT	72	33	33	0	6	183	223	72
7	Idaho Steelheads	MT	72	31	32	2	7	194	236	71
8.5
8	Bakersfield Condors	PA	72	24	41	4	3	199	241	55

Divisions: MT – Mountain, PA – Pacific

* – Division leader; y – Won division; b – Won Brabham Cup, best record in the league and first round bye

== 2011–12 Kelly Cup Playoffs ==
Conference Quarterfinals	Conference Semifinals
1	Elmira	3
8	Reading	2
1	Elmira	1
5	Florida	4
4	Greenville	0
5	Florida	3
Eastern
2	Gwinnett	2
7	South Carolina	3
7	South Carolina	1
3	Kalamazoo	4
3	Kalamazoo	3
6	Wheeling	1
Note: Pairings are re-seeded after the first round.
1	Alaska	4
5	Stockton	0
4	Colorado	1
5	Stockton	3
Western
2	Ontario	2
7	Idaho	3
7	Idaho	1
3	Las Vegas	4
3	Las Vegas	3
6	Utah	0

Conference Finals
5	Florida	4
3	Kalamazoo	1
1	Alaska	3
3	Las Vegas	4

Kelly Cup Finals
E5	Florida	4
W3	Las Vegas	1

== Player statistics ==
=== Scoring leaders ===
The following were the top ten players in the league in points at the conclusion of the 2011–12 season.

GP = Games played; G = Goals; A = Assists; Pts = Points; PIM = Penalty minutes

Player	Team	GP	G	A	Pts	PIM
Dustin Gazley	Elmira Jackals	72	25	60	85	73
Adam Miller	Las Vegas Wranglers	71	32	52	84	45
Justin Bowers	Greenville Road Warriors	69	19	59	78	37
Chad Costello	Colorado Eagles	47	29	47	76	26
Trent Daavettila	Kalamazoo Wings	69	18	56	74	40
Yannick Tifu	Reading Royals	69	23	47	70	65
Dan Kissel	Alaska Aces	70	35	33	68	30
Mathieu Aubin	Cincinnati Cyclones	62	30	38	68	59
Kevin Ulanski	Colorado Eagles	56	27	41	68	60
Eric Lampe	Las Vegas Wranglers	52	37	30	67	38

=== Leading goaltenders ===
The following were the top ten goaltenders in the league in goals against average at the conclusion of the 2011–12 season.

GP = Games played; Min = Minutes played; W = Wins; L = Losses; OTL = Overtime losses; SOL = Shootout losses; GA = Goals against; SO = Shutouts; SV% = Save percentage; GAA = Goals against average

Player	Team	GP	Min	W	L	OTL	SOL	GA	SO	SV%	GAA
Gerald Coleman	Alaska Aces	27	1644	18	5	1	3	53	3	.926	1.93
Jeff Jakaitis	Gwinnett Gladiators	26	1538	17	6	1	1	52	5	.930	2.03
Philipp Grubauer	South Carolina Stingrays	43	2536	23	13	4	1	94	1	.918	2.22
Adam Courchaine	Alaska Aces	34	2022	19	10	2	3	80	3	.908	2.37
Joe Fallon	Las Vegas Wranglers	47	2739	30	10	1	3	109	3	.912	2.39
Chris Carrozzi	Ontario Reign	30	1669	17	7	2	2	67	3	.918	2.41
John Muse	Florida Everblades	25	1489	16	6	1	2	60	1	.920	2.42
Olivier Roy	Stockton Thunder	40	2388	16	18	1	4	99	4	.925	2.49
Peter Delmas	Wheeling Nailers	37	2113	18	14	1	2	88	3	.909	2.50
Brian Stewart	Elmira Jackals	40	2294	26	11	1	1	98	1	.917	2.56

== ECHL awards ==
Patrick Kelly Cup:	Florida Everblades
Henry Brabham Cup:	Alaska Aces
Gingher Memorial Trophy:	Florida Everblades
Bruce Taylor Trophy:	Las Vegas Wranglers
John Brophy Award:	Rob Murray (Alaska Aces); John Wroblewski (Gwinnett Gladiators)
CCM U+ Most Valuable Player:	Chad Costello (Colorado Eagles)
Kelly Cup Playoffs Most Valuable Player:	John Muse (Florida Everblades)
Reebok Hockey Goaltender of the Year:	Jeff Jakaitis (Gwinnett Gladiators)
CCM Rookie of the Year:	Dustin Gazley (Elmira Jackals)
Defenseman of the Year:	Aaron Schneekloth (Colorado Eagles)
Leading Scorer:	Dustin Gazley (Elmira Jackals)
Reebok Plus Performer Award:	Mathieu Aubin (Cincinnati Cyclones)
Sportsmanship Award:	Kevin Ulanski (Colorado Eagles)
Community Service Award:	Jason Fredricks (Ontario Reign)
Birmingham Memorial Award:	Jason Rollins

=== All-ECHL Teams ===
All-ECHL First Team

(United States) F Chad Costello (Colorado)
(United States) F Dustin Gazley (Elmira)
(United States) F Eric Lampe (Las Vegas)
(United States) D Bryan Miller (Alaska)
(Canada) D Aaron Schneekloth (Colorado)
(United States) G Jeff Jakaitis (Gwinnett)

All-ECHL Second Team

(Canada) F Justin Bowers (Greenville)
(United States) F Dan Kissel (Alaska)
(United States) F Adam Miller (Las Vegas)
(Canada) D Andrew Hotham (Wheeling)
(United States) D Johann Kroll (South Carolina)
(United States) G Joe Fallon (Las Vegas)

=== ECHL All-Rookie Team ===
ECHL-All Rookie Team

(Canada) F Chris Barton (Wheeling)
(United States) F Dustin Gazley (Elmira)
(Canada) F Matthew Sisca (Cincinnati)
(Canada) D Andrew Hotham (Wheeling)
(United States) D Mike Little (Stockton)
(Germany) G Philipp Grubauer (South Carolina)

== See also ==
- ECHL All-Star Game
- List of ECHL seasons
- 2011 in sports
- 2012 in sports
