= 2012–13 ECHL season =

Ice hockey league season

- League: ECHL
- Sport: Ice hockey
- Duration: October 12, 2012 – March 30, 2013

Regular season
- Brabham Cup: Alaska Aces
- Season MVP: Ryan Zapolski (South Carolina)
- Top scorer: Mathieu Roy (Florida)

Playoffs
- Eastern champions: Reading Royals
- Eastern runners-up: Cincinnati Cyclones
- Western champions: Stockton Thunder
- Western runners-up: Idaho Steelheads
- Playoffs MVP: Riley Gill (Reading)

Kelly Cup
- Champions: Reading Royals
- Runners-up: Stockton Thunder

ECHL seasons
- ← 2011–12 2013–14 →

The 2012–13 ECHL season was the 25th season of the ECHL. The regular season schedule ran from October 12, 2012 to March 30, 2013, with the Kelly Cup playoffs to follow. The All-Star Game, not held in 2011-12, was brought back and held on January 23, 2013 at Budweiser Events Center in Loveland, Colorado, home of the Colorado Eagles.

== League business ==
=== Team changes ===
On September 21, 2011, the ECHL Board of Governors approved the membership of the San Francisco Bulls for the 2012–13 season. The Bulls will play in the Cow Palace, which was the home of the San Jose Sharks of the NHL for their first two seasons.

On November 1, 2011, the ECHL Board of Governors approved the membership of the reincarnation of the Orlando Solar Bears for the 2012–13 season. The Solar Bears will play in the Amway Center which is currently home to the NBA's Orlando Magic.

The league announced on April 6, 2012, that the expansion franchise Chicago Express had withdrawn from the ECHL, effective immediately. The Express finished their inaugural season ninth in the Eastern Conference with a record of 34 wins, 26 losses, 8 overtime losses, and 4 losses in shootouts, eliminating them from playoff contention. The team also finished last in the league for attendance, averaging 2,508 fans per game (compared to the league average of 4,282 fans per game).

On May 17, 2012, the ECHL announced the addition of two expansion franchises - the Evansville IceMen and the Fort Wayne Komets, both located in Indiana and both former Central Hockey League markets. The IceMen will play home games at the Ford Center and the Komets at the Allen County War Memorial Coliseum. The league also indicated that 23 teams would play in the 2012–13 season, making these two franchises the last to be added.

=== Annual Board of Governors meeting ===
The league's annual Board of Governors meeting concluded on June 25, 2012. Announcements included the re-election of Steve Chapman, president of the Gwinnett Gladiators, to his seventh term as board president, capping of league membership at 26 teams, adoption of a two-referee system for the conference finals and Kelly Cup finals, and the league re-alignment for the 2012–13 season. The San Francisco Bulls joined the Western Conference's Pacific Division, while in the Eastern Conference, the Orlando Solar Bears joined the South Division and the Fort Wayne Komets and Evansville IceMen joined the North Division following the departure of the Chicago Express. The league also voted to table any decision regarding the playoff format until the Board of Governors' preseason meeting.

=== Preseason Board of Governors meeting ===
The preseason Board of Governors meeting was held on September 27, 2012. Announcements included changes to the Kelly Cup playoff format and a change to the league's reserve list policy. The 3-day and 7-day injured reserve spots were changed to two generic reserve spots with no minimum stay required. No change was made to the 21-day reserve list policy.

=== All-star game ===
The 2013 ECHL All-Star Game was played on January 23, 2013, and was hosted by the Colorado Eagles at Budweiser Events Center. The format featured the host team Eagles taking on the ECHL All-Star Team. The ECHL All-Stars won the game 7–3, scoring five unanswered goals in the second period to tie an ECHL All-Star Game record.

== Regular season ==
=== Standings ===
==== By division ====
Eastern Conference

Atlantic Division
		GP	W	L	OTL	SOL	GF	GA	Pts
1	Reading Royals (WAS)	72	46	19	3	4	246	185	99
2	Elmira Jackals (OTT)	72	40	25	3	4	247	220	87
3	Wheeling Nailers (MTL/PIT)	72	31	29	3	9	193	225	74
4	Trenton Titans (PHI)	72	32	32	4	4	226	247	72

North Division
		GP	W	L	OTL	SOL	GF	GA	Pts
1	Cincinnati Cyclones (FLA/NSH)	72	42	22	5	3	227	195	92
2	Toledo Walleye (DET/CHI)	72	37	26	5	4	224	195	83
3	Kalamazoo Wings (VAN)	72	34	30	4	4	205	215	76
4	Fort Wayne Komets (ANA)	72	33	35	1	3	205	246	70
5	Evansville IceMen (CBJ/STL)	72	25	40	3	4	207	272	57

South Division
		GP	W	L	OTL	SOL	GF	GA	Pts
1	Gwinnett Gladiators (PHX)	72	43	26	2	1	211	191	89
2	Florida Everblades (TB/CAR)	72	39	22	4	7	260	241	89
3	South Carolina Stingrays (BOS)	72	38	26	5	3	198	171	84
4	Greenville Road Warriors (NYR)	72	36	28	2	6	226	219	80
5	Orlando Solar Bears (MIN/TOR)	72	28	37	3	4	197	253	63

Western Conference

Mountain Division
		GP	W	L	OTL	SOL	GF	GA	Pts
1	Alaska Aces (independent)	72	49	15	4	4	228	172	106
2	Idaho Steelheads (DAL)	72	45	20	1	6	262	198	97
3	Colorado Eagles (WPG)	72	34	31	3	4	239	224	75
4	Utah Grizzlies (CGY)	72	28	30	4	9	217	277	71

Pacific Division
		GP	W	L	OTL	SOL	GF	GA	Pts
1	Ontario Reign (LA)	72	46	19	3	4	246	192	99
2	Stockton Thunder (EDM)	72	37	26	5	4	223	216	83
3	Las Vegas Wranglers (independent)	72	37	30	2	3	196	192	79
4	San Francisco Bulls (SJ)	72	25	38	2	7	191	252	59
5	Bakersfield Condors (NYI)	72	22	44	2	4	171	247	50

==== By conference ====
Eastern Conference
R		Div	GP	W	L	OTL	SOL	GF	GA	Pts
1	z - Reading Royals *	AT	72	46	19	3	4	246	185	99
2	y - Cincinnati Cyclones *	NO	72	42	22	5	3	227	195	92
3	y - Gwinnett Gladiators *	SO	72	43	26	2	1	211	191	89
4	Florida Everblades	SO	72	38	22	4	7	254	238	89
5	Elmira Jackals	AT	72	39	25	3	4	244	218	87
6	South Carolina Stingrays	SO	72	38	26	5	3	198	171	84
7	Toledo Walleye	NO	72	37	26	5	4	224	195	83
8	Greenville Road Warriors	SO	72	36	27	2	6	225	215	80
8.5
9	Kalamazoo Wings	NO	72	34	29	4	4	203	211	76
10	Wheeling Nailers	AT	72	31	29	3	8	190	221	73
11	Trenton Titans	AT	72	31	32	4	4	222	244	70
12	Fort Wayne Komets	NO	72	32	35	1	3	201	244	68
13	Orlando Solar Bears	SO	72	28	36	3	4	194	247	63
14	Evansville IceMen	NO	72	24	40	3	4	203	272	55

Divisions: AT - Atlantic, NO - North, SO - South

* - Division leader; y - Won division; z - Won conference (and division)

Western Conference
R		Div	GP	W	L	OTL	SOL	GF	GA	Pts
1	b - Alaska Aces *	MT	72	49	15	4	4	228	172	106
2	y - Ontario Reign *	PA	72	46	19	3	4	246	192	99
3	Idaho Steelheads *	MT	72	45	19	1	6	260	194	97
4	Stockton Thunder	PA	72	36	26	5	4	219	214	81
5	Las Vegas Wranglers	PA	72	37	30	2	3	196	192	79
6	Colorado Eagles	MT	72	34	31	3	3	236	220	75
7	Utah Grizzlies	MT	72	28	30	4	9	213	245	71
8	San Francisco Bulls	PA	72	24	38	2	7	186	251	59
8.5
9	Bakersfield Condors	PA	72	22	44	2	4	171	247	50

Divisions: MT - Mountain, PA - Pacific

* - Division leader; y - Won division; b - Won Brabham Cup, best record in the league

== 2013 Kelly Cup playoffs ==
=== Format ===
The 2013 Kelly Cup playoffs format represented a significant departure from previous years. Eight teams qualified in the Eastern Conference: the three division winners plus the next five teams in the conference. With the addition of the expansion franchise in the San Francisco Bulls, the Board of Governors changed the Western Conference seeding such that eight teams qualified: two division winners and the next six teams in the conference. This eliminated the Western Conference first-round bye.

Similar to the NHL, the division winners were seeded as the top three seeds in the Eastern Conference and the top two seeds in the Western Conference; the conference winner faces the eighth seed, second faces seventh, third faces sixth, and fourth faces fifth in the conference quarterfinal round. The winner of the 1st/8th series plays the winner of the 4th/5th series while 2nd/7th winner plays against the 3rd/6th winner in the conference semifinal series.

The Board of Governors also elected to change the playoff format such that all rounds of the playoffs were best of seven series. For 2013, the conference finals and Kelly Cup finals used a two-referee system.

=== Bracket ===
Conference quarterfinals	Conference semifinals
1	Reading	4
8	Greenville	2
1	Reading	4
4	Florida	3
4	Florida	4
5	Elmira	2
Eastern Conference
2	Cincinnati	4
7	Toledo	2
2	Cincinnati	4
3	Gwinnett	2
3	Gwinnett Gladiators	4
6	South Carolina	0
1	Alaska	4
8	San Francisco	1
1	Alaska	2
4	Stockton	4
4	Stockton	4
5	Las Vegas	3
Western Conference
2	Ontario	4
7	Utah	0
2	Ontario	2
3	Idaho	4
3	Idaho	4
6	Colorado	2

Conference finals
1	Reading	4
2	Cincinnati	1
4	Stockton	4
3	Idaho	1

Kelly Cup finals
1	Reading	4
4	Stockton	1

== Awards ==
=== All-ECHL First Team ===
- Michael Forney (F), Colorado Eagles
- Casey Pierro-Zabotel (F), Gwinnett Gladiators
- Mathieu Roy (F), Florida Everblades
- Matt Case (D), Idaho Steelheads
- Sacha Guimond (D), Gwinnett Gladiators
- Ryan Zapolski (G), South Carolina Stingrays

== See also ==
- List of ECHL seasons
- 2012 in sports
- 2013 in sports
