= 2023 Kelly Cup playoffs =

2023 ECHL playoffs

Tournament details
- Dates: April 19 – June 9
- Teams: 16

Final positions
- Champions: Florida Everblades
- Runners-up: Idaho Steelheads

Tournament statistics
- Scoring leader(s): Wade Murphy (Idaho) & Sean Josling (Florida) (20 points)

Awards
- MVP: Cam Johnson (Florida)

The 2023 Kelly Cup playoffs of the ECHL hockey league began on April 19, 2023, following the conclusion of the 2022–23 ECHL regular season and ended on June 9 with the Florida Everblades winning their second consecutive Kelly Cup and third overall over the Idaho Steelheads in four games.

== Playoff format ==
Since all 28 teams were able to complete all 72 games this season, the league went back to the points system, instead of the point percentage that was used the year prior. The top 4 teams in each division qualified for the playoffs based on highest point total earned in the season. The first two rounds of the playoffs are held within the division with the first seed facing the fourth seed and the second seed facing the third. The division champions then play each other in a conference championship. The Kelly Cup finals pits the Eastern Conference champion against the Western Conference champion. All four rounds are a best-of-seven format. The Idaho Steelheads secured the top record, winning the Brabham Cup, and therefore scheduled to have home ice advantage for all the rounds they advance in.

Eleven out of the 16 teams in this year's playoffs were participants in the previous Kelly Cup Playoffs.

== Playoff seeds ==
After the regular season, 16 teams qualified for the playoffs. The Toledo Walleye were the first to clinch a playoff spot for the second year in a row, while the Adirondack Thunder were the last, completing the impossible comeback to overtake the Worcester Railers for the final spot in the North Division.

Final seeds and points:

=== Eastern Conference ===
==== North Division ====
- Newfoundland Growlers – Division champions, 98 pts
- Reading Royals – 88 pts
- Maine Mariners – 87 pts
- Adirondack Thunder – 75 pts

==== South Division ====
- South Carolina Stingrays – Division champions, 95 pts
- Jacksonville Icemen – 93 pts
- Greenville Swamp Rabbits – 89 pts
- Florida Everblades – 85 pts

=== Western Conference ===
==== Central Division ====
- Cincinnati Cyclones – Division champions, 103 pts
- Toledo Walleye – 98 pts
- Indy Fuel – 91 pts
- Fort Wayne Komets – 75 pts

==== Mountain Division ====
- Idaho Steelheads – Brabham Cup winners, Division champions, 119 pts
- Allen Americans – 77 pts
- Kansas City Mavericks – 76 pts
- Utah Grizzlies – 74 pts

== Playoff bracket ==
Division Semifinals	Division Finals
N1	Newfoundland	4
N4	Adirondack	1
N1	Newfoundland	4
North Division
N2	Reading	1
N2	Reading	4
N3	Maine	2
Eastern Conference
S1	South Carolina	2
S4	Florida	4
S4	Florida	4
South Division
S2	Jacksonville	2
S2	Jacksonville	4
S3	Greenville	2
C1	Cincinnati	4
C4	Fort Wayne	3
C1	Cincinnati	0
Central Division
C2	Toledo	4
C2	Toledo	4
C3	Indy	0
Western Conference
M1	Idaho	4
M4	Utah	2
M1	Idaho	4
Mountain Division
M2	Allen	1
M2	Allen	4
M3	Kansas City	2

Conference Finals
N1	Newfoundland	2
S4	Florida	4
C2	Toledo	1
M1	Idaho	4

Kelly Cup Finals
S4	Florida	4
M1	Idaho	0

== Division semifinals ==
=== North Division ===
==== (1) Newfoundland Growlers vs. (4) Adirondack Thunder ====
April 19	Newfoundland Growlers	3–5	Adirondack Thunder	Cool Insuring Arena	Recap
Michael Joyaux (1) –13:44; Orrin Centazzo (1) – pp – 19:40		First period	3:44 – pp – Ryan Orgel (1); 4:28 – Matt Jennings (1)
No scoring		Second period	7:20 – Grant Jozefek (1); 9:12 – Shane Harper (1); 10:28 – Ryan Orgel (2)
Tommy Miller (1) – sh – 5:46		Third period	No scoring
Luke Cavallin 13 saves / 18 shots Dryden McKay 13 saves / 13 shots		Goalie stats	Mike Robinson 28 saves / 31 shots

April 21	Newfoundland Growlers	8–4	Adirondack Thunder	Cool Insuring Arena	Recap
8:41 – Matt Hellickson (1)		First period	No scoring
3:42 – pp – Keenan Suthers (1); 9:53 – Todd Skirving (1); 12:21 – Todd Skirving (2); 15:47 – Zach O'Brien (1)		Second period	Matt Jennings (2) – 8:49; Matt Slick (1) – 19:29
0:58 – Keenan Suthers (2); 9:54 – pp – Zach Solow (1); 16:38 – en – Nolan Walker (1)		Third period	Wayne Létourneau (1) – 6:18; Shawn Weller (1) – pp – 12:19
Dryden McKay 21 saves / 25 shots		Goalie stats	Mike Robinson 19 saves / 25 shots Jake Theut 8 saves / 9 shots

April 22	Newfoundland Growlers	7-1	Adirondack Thunder	Cool Insuring Arena	Recap
3		First period	0
4		Second period	1
0		Third period	0
Dryden McKay		Goalie stats	Jake Theut, Mike Robinson

April 27	Adirondack Thunder	3-5	Newfoundland Growlers	Mary Brown's Centre	Recap
0		First period	3
2		Second period	0
1		Third period	2
Jake Theut		Goalie stats	Dryden McKay

April 30	Adirondack Thunder	0-3	Newfoundland Growlers	Mary Brown's Centre	Recap
0		First period	3
0		Second period	0
0		Third period	0
Jake Theut		Goalie stats	Dryden McKay

Newfoundland won series 4-1

==== (2) Reading Royals vs. (3) Maine Mariners ====
April 21	Maine Mariners	1-2	Reading Royals	Santander Arena	Recap
No scoring		First period	No scoring
No scoring		Second period	No scoring
Curtis Hall (1) – 13:15		Third period	0:21 – Solag Bakich (1); 16:06 – Charlie Gerard (1)
Michael DiPietro 31 saves / 33 shots		Goalie stats	Pat Nagle 25 saves / 26 shots

April 22	Maine Mariners	3-5	Reading Royals	Santander Arena	Recap
2		First period	2
0		Second period	2
1		Third period	1
Michael DiPietro, François Brassard		Goalie stats	Pat Nagle

April 24	Reading Royals	3-4	OT	Maine Mariners	Cross Insurance Arena	Recap
1		First period		2
0		Second period		0
2		Third period		1
0		First overtime period		1
Pat Nagle		Goalie stats		François Brassard

April 25	Reading Royals	3-7	Maine Mariners	Cross Insurance Arena	Recap
1		First period	2
1		Second period	2
1		Third period	3
Nolan Maier		Goalie stats	François Brassard

April 26	Reading Royals	4-3	Maine Mariners	Cross Insurance Arena	Recap
2		First period	1
0		Second period	2
2		Third period	0
Pat Nagle		Goalie stats	François Brassard

April 29	Maine Mariners	2-6	Reading Royals	Santander Arena	Recap
1		First period	2
1		Second period	2
0		Third period	2
François Brassard		Goalie stats	Pat Nagle

Reading won series 4-2

=== South Division ===
==== (1) South Carolina Stingrays vs. (4) Florida Everblades ====
April 22	Florida Everblades	5–0	South Carolina Stingrays	North Charleston Coliseum	Recap
Sean Josling (1) – pp – 8:44; Sean Josling (2) – 11:45; Tyler Irvine (1) – 16:53		First period	No scoring
Tyler Irvine (2) – 9:39; Ashton Calder (1) – pp – 12:33		Second period	No scoring
No scoring		Third period	No scoring
Cam Johnson 35 saves / 35 shots		Goalie stats	Tyler Wall 23 saves / 28 shots

April 24	Florida Everblades	0–4	South Carolina Stingrays	North Charleston Coliseum	Recap
No scoring		First period	3:42 – pp – Kevin O'Neil (1); 14:49 – Ryan Scarfo (1); 16:49 – pp – Ty Thorpe (1)
No scoring		Second period	No scoring
No scoring		Third period	16:30 – sh – en – Lawton Courtnall (1)
Cam Johnson 25 saves / 28 shots		Goalie stats	Clay Stevenson 27 saves / 27 shots

April 26	South Carolina Stingrays	3–4	OT	Florida Everblades	Hertz Arena	Recap
Chaz Reddekopp (1) – 14:19		First period		11:56 – pp – Sean Josling (3)
Jarid Lukosevicius (1) – pp – 11:12		Second period		7:59 – Joe Pendenza (1); 8:39 – Levko Koper (1)
Jarid Lukosevicius (2) – 19:20		Third period		No scoring
No scoring		First overtime period		5:23 – Logan Lambdin (1)
Clay Stevenson 32 saves / 36 shots		Goalie stats		Cam Johnson 32 saves / 35 shots

April 28	South Carolina Stingrays	4–2	Florida Everblades	Hertz Arena	Recap
Jarid Lukosevicius (3) – 3:22; Josh Wilkins (1) – pp – 4:00		First period	2:20 – Oliver Chau (1)
No scoring		Second period	No scoring
Jarid Lukosevicius (4) – 10:39; Anthony Del Gaizo (1) – en – 19:43		Third period	0:43 – Sean Josling (4)
Clay Stevenson 34 saves / 36 shots		Goalie stats	Cam Johnson 22 saves / 25 shots

April 29	South Carolina Stingrays	0–4	Florida Everblades	Hertz Arena	Recap
No scoring		First period	Blake Winiecki (1) – 11:05
No scoring		Second period	Joe Pendenza (2) – pp – 17:20
No scoring		Third period	Logan Lambdin (2) – pp – 8:24; Blake Winiecki (2) – en – 17:38
Clay Stevenson 13 saves / 16 shots		Goalie stats	Cam Johnson 35 saves / 35 shots

May 1	Florida Everblades	2–1	OT	South Carolina Stingrays	North Charleston Coliseum	Recap
No scoring		First period		No scoring
13:04 – pp – Logan Lambdin (3)		Second period		No scoring
No scoring		Third period		Bear Hughes (1) – pp – 4:52
9:55 – Joe Pendenza (2)		First overtime period		No scoring
Cam Johnson 28 saves / 29 shots		Goalie stats		Clay Stevenson 31 saves / 33 shots

Florida won series 4-2

==== (2) Jacksonville Icemen vs. (3) Greenville Swamp Rabbits ====
April 21	Greenville Swamp Rabbits	4–1	Jacksonville Icemen	VyStar Veterans Memorial Arena	Recap
Ben Freeman (1) – pp – 14:10		First period	No scoring
No scoring		Second period	No scoring
Josh McKechney (1) – 2:25; Joe Gatenby (1) – 3:39; Alex Ierullo (1) – en – 15:55		Third period	7:20 – Craig Martin (1)
Ryan Bednard 25 saves / 26 shots		Goalie stats	Charles Williams 27 saves / 30 shots

April 23	Greenville Swamp Rabbits	1–2	2OT	Jacksonville Icemen	VyStar Veterans Memorial Arena	Recap
No scoring		First period		No scoring
Josh McKechney (2) – 0:15		Second period		No scoring
No scoring		Third period		0:43 – Benjamin Tardif (1)
No scoring		Second overtime period		4:18 – Brendan Harris (1)
Ryan Bednard 30 saves / 32 shots		Goalie stats		Charles Williams 31 saves / 32 shots

April 25	Jacksonville Icemen	7–4	Greenville Swamp Rabbits	Bon Secours Wellness Arena	Recap
Derek Lodermeier (1) – pp – 12:35; Matt Iacopelli (1) – 16:08		First period	4:50 – pp – Tanner Eberle (1)
Craig Martin (2) – 1:27; Cristiano DiGiacinto (1) – 3:02; Derek Lodermeier (2) – 18:15		Second period	No scoring
Luke Lynch (1) – en – 19:13; Derek Lodermeier (3) – en – 19:28		Third period	10:47 – pp – Max Martin (1); 15:13 – Tanner Eberle (2); 18:21 – Nikita Pavlychev (1)
Charles Williams 30 saves / 34 shots		Goalie stats	Ryan Bednard 6 saves / 10 shots Luke Richardson 12 saves / 13 shots

April 28	Jacksonville Icemen	1–3	Greenville Swamp Rabbits	Bon Secours Wellness Arena	Recap
Matt Iacopelli (2) – 13:43		First period	No scoring
No scoring		Second period	13:51 – Joe Leahy (1)
No scoring		Third period	2:21 – Ben Freeman (2); 3:35 – Justin Nachbaur (1)
Charles Williams 29 saves / 32 shots		Goalie stats	Ryan Bednard 22 saves / 23 shots

April 29	Jacksonville Icemen	5–4	Greenville Swamp Rabbits	Bon Secours Wellness Arena	Recap
15:14 – Luke Lynch (2)		First period	Nikita Pavlychev (2) – 4:03; Ben Freeman (3) – 8:33
4:34 – Craig Martin (3); 6:49 – Ara Nazarian (1); 7:49 – Matt Iacopelli (3); 17:59 – Brandon Fortunato (1)		Second period	No scoring
No scoring		Third period	Ben Freeman (4) – 9:39; Carter Souch (1) – pp – 12:57
Charles Williams 4 saves / 6 shots Olof Lindbom 27 saves / 29 shots		Goalie stats	Ryan Bednard 16 saves / 20 shots Luke Richardson 8 saves / 9 shots

May 2	Greenville Swamp Rabbits	2–4	Jacksonville Icemen	VyStar Veterans Memorial Arena	Recap
No scoring		First period	Ara Nazarian (2) – pp – 18:15
No scoring		Second period	Ara Nazarian (3) – pp – 16:57
1:17 – Carter Souch (2); 9:00 – Brett Kemp (1)		Third period	Craig Martin (4) – pp – 15:00; Christopher Brown (1) – en – 19:20
Ryan Bednard 19 saves / 22 shots		Goalie stats	Olof Lindbom 17 saves / 19 shots

Jacksonville won series 4-2

=== Central Division ===
==== (1) Cincinnati Cyclones vs. (4) Fort Wayne Komets ====
April 21	Fort Wayne Komets	3-4	OT	Cincinnati Cyclones	Heritage Bank Center	Recap
Oliver Cooper (1) – 2:24; Tye Felhaber (1) – 16:09; Tye Felhaber (2) – 19:13		First period		No scoring
No scoring		Second period		No scoring
No scoring		Third period		3:10 – pp – Zack Andrusiak (1); 6:11 – Zack Andrusiak (2); 13:07 – Matt Berry (1)
No scoring		First overtime period		2:42 – Louie Caporusso (1)
Rylan Parenteau 36 saves / 40 shots		Goalie stats		Mark Sinclair 8 saves / 11 shots Beck Warm 24 saves / 24 shots

April 22	Fort Wayne Komets	1-2	Cincinnati Cyclones	Heritage Bank Center	Recap
0		First period	2
0		Second period	0
1		Third period	0
Ryan Fanti		Goalie stats	Beck Warm

April 25	Cincinnati Cyclones	0-3	Fort Wayne Komets	Allen County War Memorial Coliseum	Recap
0		First period	1
0		Second period	0
0		Third period	2
Beck Warm		Goalie stats	Ryan Fanti

April 28	Cincinnati Cyclones	3-2	Fort Wayne Komets	Allen County War Memorial Coliseum	Recap
1		First period	0
2		Second period	0
0		Third period	2
Beck Warm		Goalie stats	Ryan Fanti

April 30	Cincinnati Cyclones	2-3	Fort Wayne Komets	Allen County War Memorial Coliseum	Recap
0		First period	0
0		Second period	2
2		Third period	1
Beck Warm		Goalie stats	Ryan Fanti

May 2	Fort Wayne Komets	6-0	Cincinnati Cyclones	Heritage Bank Center	Recap
2		First period	0
1		Second period	0
3		Third period	0
Ryan Fanti		Goalie stats	Beck Warm, Mark Sinclair

May 3	Fort Wayne Komets	0-1	Cincinnati Cyclones	Heritage Bank Center	Recap
0		First period	0
0		Second period	1
0		Third period	0
Ryan Fanti		Goalie stats	Beck Warm

Cincinnati won series 4-3

==== (2) Toledo Walleye vs. (3) Indy Fuel ====
April 21	Indy Fuel	1–4	Toledo Walleye	Huntington Center	Recap
Colin Bilek (1) – pp – 14:57		First period	8:55 – pp – Seth Barton (1)
No scoring		Second period	No scoring
No scoring		Third period	5:34 – pp – Gordie Green (1); 9:08 – pp – Brandon Hawkins (1); 18:49 – pp – Trenton Bliss (1)
Mitchell Weeks 28 saves / 32 shots		Goalie stats	Sebastian Cossa 18 saves / 19 shots

April 22	Indy Fuel	2-4	Toledo Walleye	Huntington Center	Recap
1		First period	1
0		Second period	1
1		Third period	2
Mitchell Weeks		Goalie stats	John Lethemon

April 25	Toledo Walleye	4-1	Indy Fuel	Indiana Farmers Coliseum	Recap
0		First period	0
2		Second period	0
2		Third period	1
Sebastian Cossa		Goalie stats	Mitchell Weeks

April 27	Toledo Walleye	5-3	Indy Fuel	Indiana Farmers Coliseum	Recap
2		First period	2
0		Second period	1
3		Third period	0
John Lethemon		Goalie stats	Mitchell Weeks

Toledo won series 4–0

=== Mountain Division ===
==== (1) Idaho Steelheads vs. (4) Utah Grizzlies ====
April 19	Utah Grizzlies	3–0	Idaho Steelheads	Idaho Central Arena	Recap
No scoring		First period	No scoring
Dakota Raabe (1) – 16:07		Second period	No scoring
Kyle Betts (1) – 1:54; Jordan Martel (1) – en – 18:06		Third period	No scoring
Trent Miner 43 saves / 43 shots		Goalie stats	Adam Scheel 21 saves / 23 shots

April 21	Utah Grizzlies	3–2	Idaho Steelheads	Idaho Central Arena	Recap
Tarun Fizer (1) – pp – 16:54		First period	No scoring
No scoring		Second period	No scoring
Kyle Mayhew (1) – 3:39; Dylan Fitze (1) – en – 17:18		Third period	5:06 – Cody Haiskanen (1); 17:55 – Ty Pelton-Byce (1)
Trent Miner 29 saves / 31 shots		Goalie stats	Adam Scheel 29 saves / 31 shots

April 26	Idaho Steelheads	3–2	OT	Utah Grizzlies	Maverik Center	Recap
Wade Murphy (1) – 0:35		First period		No scoring
Colton Kehler (1) – 11:46		Second period		8:16 – pp – Cameron Wright (1); 8:44 – Dylan Fitze (2)
No scoring		Third period		No scoring
Willie Knierim (1) – pp – 0:26		First overtime period		No scoring
Adam Scheel 25 saves / 27 shots		Goalie stats		Trent Miner 34 saves / 37 shots

April 28	Idaho Steelheads	6–5	OT	Utah Grizzlies	Maverik Center	Recap
Ty Pelton-Byce (2) – 0:49; A.J. White (1) – 13:44		First period		2:36 – pp – Kyle Betts (2); 4:39 – Zach Tsekos (1); 13:16 – pp – Cameron Wright (2); 18:09 – Keaton Jameson (1)
Jordan Kawaguchi (1) – 5:28; A.J. White (2) – pp – 11:19		Second period		No scoring
Wade Murphy (2) – pp – 4:19		Third period		8:58 – Kyle Mayhew (2)
Ty Pelton-Byce (3) – 3:27		First overtime period		No scoring
Adam Scheel 29 saves / 34 shots		Goalie stats		Trent Miner 45 saves / 51 shots

April 29	Idaho Steelheads	3–2	OT	Utah Grizzlies	Maverik Center	Recap
3:27 – pp – Justin Ducharme (1)		First period		Nolan Ritchie (1) – 3:00
9:19 – Ryan Dmowski (1)		Second period		Tarun Fizer (2) – pp – 19:23
No scoring		Third period		No scoring
1:26 – Willie Knierim (2)		First overtime period		No scoring
Adam Scheel 29 saves / 31 shots		Goalie stats		Trent Miner 33 saves / 36 shots

May 1	Utah Grizzlies	2–3	OT	Idaho Steelheads	Idaho Central Arena	Recap
No scoring		First period		Zane Franklin (1) – 9:04
13:12 – Kyle Betts (3)		Second period		No scoring
8:58 – Dylan Fitze (3)		Third period		A.J. White (3) – 10:34
No scoring		First overtime period		Jack Becker (1) – 3:48
Trent Miner 29 saves / 32 shots		Goalie stats		Adam Scheel 21 saves / 23 shots

Idaho won series 4-2

==== (2) Allen Americans vs. (3) Kansas City Mavericks ====
April 19	Allen Americans	3–2	Kansas City Mavericks	Cable Dahmer Arena	Recap
2		First period	0
1		Second period	2
0		Third period	0
Kevin Mandolese		Goalie stats	Shane Starrett

April 20	Allen Americans	2–3	Kansas City Mavericks	Cable Dahmer Arena	Recap
0		First period	1
1		Second period	1
1		Third period	1
Kevin Mandolese		Goalie stats	Shane Starrett

April 24	Allen Americans	1-0	OT	Kansas City Mavericks	Cable Dahmer Arena	Recap
No scoring		First period		No scoring
No scoring		Second period		No scoring
No scoring		Third period		No scoring
Jack Combs (2) – 0:26		First overtime period		No scoring
Kevin Mandolese 27 saves / 27 shots		Goalie stats		Shane Starrett 34 saves / 35 shots

April 28	Kansas City Mavericks	2-1	Allen Americans	Credit Union of Texas Event Center	Recap
1		First period	1
0		Second period	0
1		Third period	0
Shane Starrett		Goalie stats	Kevin Mandolese

April 29	Kansas City Mavericks	3-4	Allen Americans	Credit Union of Texas Event Center	Recap
1		First period	1
0		Second period	3
2		Third period	0
Shane Starrett		Goalie stats	Kevin Mandolese

May 1	Kansas City Mavericks	1-2	Allen Americans	Credit Union of Texas Event Center	Recap
0		First period	1
0		Second period	0
1		Third period	1
Shane Starrett		Goalie stats	Kevin Mandolese

Allen won series 4-2

== Division finals ==
=== North Division ===
==== (1) Newfoundland Growlers vs. (2) Reading Royals ====
May 6	Newfoundland Growlers	3-0	Reading Royals	Santander Arena	Recap
1		First period	0
0		Second period	0
2		Third period	0
Dryden McKay		Goalie stats	Pat Nagle

May 7	Newfoundland Growlers	5-4	OT	Reading Royals	Santander Arena	Recap
2		First period		2
1		Second period		1
1		Third period		1
1		First overtime period		0
Dryden McKay		Goalie stats		Pat Nagle

May 9	Newfoundland Growlers	6-3	Reading Royals	Santander Arena	Recap
3		First period	1
3		Second period	0
0		Third period	2
Dryden McKay		Goalie stats	Pat Nagle; Kaden Fulcher

May 11	Reading Royals	6-3	Newfoundland Growlers	Mary Brown's Centre	Recap
4		First period	0
0		Second period	2
2		Third period	1
Kaden Fulcher		Goalie stats	Dryden McKay

May 13	Reading Royals	2-5	Newfoundland Growlers	Mary Brown's Centre	Recap
1		First period	2
1		Second period	2
0		Third period	1
Pat Nagle		Goalie stats	Dryden McKay

Newfoundland won series 4-1

=== South Division ===
==== (2) Jacksonville Icemen vs. (4) Florida Everblades ====
May 6	Florida Everblades	5–2	Jacksonville Icemen	VyStar Veterans Memorial Arena	Recap
John McCarron (1) – 16:51		First period	No scoring
Blake Winiecki (3) – 5:58; Sean Josling (5) – 16:46; Joe Pendenza (4) – 18:46		Second period	6:51 – Christopher Brown (2); 18:04 – Derek Lodermeier (4)
Blake Winiecki (4) – 7:10		Third period	No scoring
Cam Johnson 17 saves / 19 shots		Goalie stats	Olof Lindbom 25 saves / 30 shots

May 7	Florida Everblades	4–3	Jacksonville Icemen	VyStar Veterans Memorial Arena	Recap
Sean Josling (6) – pp – 0:23; Oliver Chau (2) – 19:34		First period	11:22 – Matt Iacopelli (4)
Logan Lambdin (4) – 18:57		Second period	16:42 – Ben Hawerchuk (1)
Joe Pendenza (5) – 16:53		Third period	5:34 – Jacob Panetta (1)
Cam Johnson 40 saves / 43 shots		Goalie stats	Parker Gahagen 24 saves / 28 shots

May 10	Jacksonville Icemen	0–2	Florida Everblades	Hertz Arena	Recap
No scoring		First period	No scoring
No scoring		Second period	6:37 – pp – Sean Josling (7); 12:20 – Tyler Irvine (3)
No scoring		Third period	No scoring
Charles Williams 20 saves / 22 shots		Goalie stats	Cam Johnson 26 saves / 26 shots

May 12	Jacksonville Icemen	4–3	OT	Florida Everblades	Hertz Arena	Recap
Craig Martin (5) – pp – 13:20		First period		13:54 – Tyler Irvine (4)
Ben Tardif (2) – pp – 8:57		Second period		No scoring
Christopher Brown (3) – pp – 1:53		Third period		11:04 – Ashton Calder (2); 13:58 – John McCarron (2)
Brendan Harris (2) – pp – 8:00		First overtime period		No scoring
Parker Gahagen 27 saves / 30 shots		Goalie stats		Cam Johnson 32 saves / 36 shots

May 13	Jacksonville Icemen	6–3	Florida Everblades	Hertz Arena	Recap
0:11 – Craig Martin (6); 10:08 – Derek Lodermeier (5)		First period	John McCarron (3) – 9:12
19:13 – pp – Brendan Harris (3)		Second period	Oliver Chau (3) – pp – 3:57
1:08 – Derek Lodermeier (6); 8:50 – Christopher Brown (4); 18:56 – en – Christopher Brown (5)		Third period	Oliver Chau (4) – pp – 12:19
Parker Gahagen 32 saves / 35 shots		Goalie stats	Cam Johnson 16 saves / 21 shots

May 15	Florida Everblades	5–2	Jacksonville Icemen	VyStar Veterans Memorial Arena	Recap
9:13 – Tyler Irvine (5)		First period	No scoring
1:51 – Cole Moberg (1)		Second period	Ara Nazarian (4) – 18:56
11:19 – Tyler Irvine (6); 19:14 – en – Levko Koper (2); 19:37 – en – Tyler Irvine (7)		Third period	Derek Lodermeier (7) – 18:32
Cam Johnson 17 saves / 19 shots		Goalie stats	Parker Gahagen 23 saves / 26 shots

Florida won series 4-2

=== Central Division ===
==== (1) Cincinnati Cyclones vs. (2) Toledo Walleye ====
May 5	Toledo Walleye	6-2	Cincinnati Cyclones	Heritage Bank Center	Recap
2		First period	1
0		Second period	0
4		Third period	1
Sebastian Cossa		Goalie stats	Beck Warm

May 6	Toledo Walleye	5-2	Cincinnati Cyclones	Heritage Bank Center	Recap
2		First period	0
1		Second period	1
2		Third period	1
John Lethemon		Goalie stats	Beck Warm

May 10	Cincinnati Cyclones	1-2	Toledo Walleye	Huntington Center	Recap
0		First period	0
0		Second period	2
1		Third period	0
Mark Sinclair		Goalie stats	Sebastian Cossa

May 12	Cincinnati Cyclones	2-9	Toledo Walleye	Huntington Center	Recap
0		First period	3
1		Second period	4
1		Third period	2
Mark Sinclair, Beck Warm		Goalie stats	John Lethemon

Toledo won series 4-0

=== Mountain Division ===
==== (1) Idaho Steelheads vs. (2) Allen Americans ====
May 5	Idaho Steelheads	5–4	Allen Americans	Credit Union of Texas Event Center	Recap
14:01 – Jack Becker (2)		First period	Grant Hebert (1) – 13:53
5:03 – Justin Ducharme (2); 10:56 – Willie Knierim (3); 18:17 – Jordan Kawaguchi (2)		Second period	Colby McAuley (1) – 4:21; Stefan Fournier (3) – pp – 14:02
0:18 – Wade Murphy (3)		Third period	Jack Combs (3) – 15:21
Adam Scheel 35 saves / 39 shots		Goalie stats	Kevin Mandolese 41 saves / 46 shots

May 10	Allen Americans	2–6	Idaho Steelheads	Idaho Central Arena	Recap
No scoring		First period	14:40 – Zane Franklin (2)
No scoring		Second period	9:48 – pp – Wade Murphy (4); 13:22 – Ryan Dmowski (3)
9:43 – Colby McAuley (2); 18:33 – pp – Jack Combs (4)		Third period	1:49 – Ryan Dmowski (4); 10:45 – Jack Becker (3); 16:17 – pp – Owen Headrick (1)
Kevin Mandolese 34 saves / 37 shots Chase Perry 16 saves / 19 shots		Goalie stats	Adam Scheel 21 saves / 23 shots

May 12	Allen Americans	7–2	Idaho Steelheads	Idaho Central Arena	Recap
3:41 – pp – Colton Hargrove (4); 10:37 – Liam Finlay (2); 14:35 – Colton Hargrove (5)		First period	Colton Kehler (2) – 1:29
3:57 – Chad Butcher (2); 19:16 – Hank Crone (1)		Second period	Ryan Dmowski (4) – pp – 7:28
9:16 – Grant Hebert (2); 9:32 – Justin Young (1)		Third period	No scoring
Chase Perry 54 saves / 56 shots		Goalie stats	Adam Scheel 16 saves / 23 shots Josh Boyko 5 saves / 5 shots

May 13	Allen Americans	3–9	Idaho Steelheads	Idaho Central Arena	Recap
No scoring		First period	Casey Johnson (1) – 9:13; Ryan Dmowski (5) – pp – 12:44; Ty Pelton-Byce (4) – 18:28
10:09 – Jack Combs (5); 14:26 – pp – Colton Hargrove (6)		Second period	Wade Murphy (5) – 1:29; A.J. White (4) – pp – 5:50; Colton Kehler (3) – 10:47; Wade Murphy (6) – 16:37
14:36 – Ryan Gagnon (1)		Third period	Jordan Kawaguchi (3) – pp – 10:46; Wade Murphy (7) – 15:18
Kevin Mandolese 18 saves / 25 shots Chase Perry 16 saves / 18 shots		Goalie stats	Adam Scheel 28 saves / 31 shots

May 14	Allen Americans	0–6	Idaho Steelheads	Idaho Central Arena	Recap
No scoring		First period	7:50 – Justin Misiak (1); 9:49 – Ryan Dmowski (6); 13:08 – pp – Wade Murphy (8); 19:18 – Jade Miller (1)
No scoring		Second period	10:53 – pp – Wade Murphy (9)
No scoring		Third period	9:18 – pp – Ryan Dmowski (7)
Chase Perry 43 saves / 49 shots		Goalie stats	Adam Scheel 37 saves / 37 shots

Idaho won series 4-1

== Conference finals ==
=== Eastern Conference ===
==== (N1) Newfoundland Growlers vs. (S4) Florida Everblades ====
May 19	Newfoundland Growlers	2–6	Florida Everblades	Hertz Arena	Recap
No scoring		First period	Blake Winiecki (5) – 3:29; Tyler Irvine (8) – 19:27
1:57 – pp – Orrin Centazzo (4); 4:09 – Keenan Suthers (6)		Second period	Ben Masella (1) – 14:38; Blake Winiecki (6) – 18:12; Will Calverley (1) – 18:57
No scoring		Third period	Logan Lambdin (5) – en – 19:01
Dryden McKay 21 saves / 26 shots		Goalie stats	Cam Johnson 17 saves / 19 shots

May 20	Newfoundland Growlers	4–5	2OT	Florida Everblades	Hertz Arena	Recap
2:09 – Isaac Johnson (5)		First period		Tyler Irvine (9) – 19:36
4:35 – Zach Solow (4); 6:22 – Zach Solow (5)		Second period		No scoring
7:10 – Todd Skirving (6)		Third period		Oliver Chau (5) – 4:45; Oliver Chau (6) – 7:38; Sean Josling (8) – 16:22
No scoring		Second overtime period		John McCarron (4) – 6:08
Dryden McKay 39 saves / 44 shots		Goalie stats		Cam Johnson 24 saves / 28 shots

May 22	Newfoundland Growlers	4-1	Florida Everblades	Hertz Arena	Recap
2		First period	0
2		Second period	0
0		Third period	1
Luke Cavallin		Goalie stats	Cam Johnson

May 25	Florida Everblades	1-2	OT	Newfoundland Growlers	Mary Brown's Centre	Recap
0		First period		0
1		Second period		1
0		Third period		0
0		First overtime period		1
Cam Johnson		Goalie stats		Luke Cavallin

May 28	Florida Everblades	5-2	Newfoundland Growlers	Mary Brown's Centre	Recap
1		First period	1
1		Second period	1
3		Third period	0
Cam Johnson		Goalie stats	Luke Cavallin

May 30	Florida Everblades	3-2	2OT	Newfoundland Growlers	Mary Brown's Centre	Recap
1		First period		1
1		Second period		1
0		Third period		0
1		Second overtime period		0
Cam Johnson		Goalie stats		Luke Cavallin

Florida won series 4-2

=== Western Conference ===
==== (M1) Idaho Steelheads vs. (C2) Toledo Walleye ====
May 20	Toledo Walleye	0–3	Idaho Steelheads	Idaho Central Arena	Recap
No scoring		First period	No scoring
No scoring		Second period	4:11 – Jade Miller (2)
No scoring		Third period	11:30 – pp – Ty Pelton-Byce (5); 19:10 – en – Willie Knierim (4)
Sebastian Cossa 30 saves / 32 shots		Goalie stats	Adam Scheel 29 saves / 29 shots

May 21	Toledo Walleye	0-3	Idaho Steelheads	Idaho Central Arena	Recap
0		First period	1
0		Second period	1
0		Third period	1
John Lethemon		Goalie stats	Adam Scheel

May 24	Idaho Steelheads	4-5	Toledo Walleye	Huntington Center	Recap
2		First period	1
2		Second period	1
0		Third period	3
Adam Scheel		Goalie stats	Sebastian Cossa

May 26	Idaho Steelheads	4-3	Toledo Walleye	Huntington Center	Recap
1		First period	1
2		Second period	1
1		Third period	1
Adam Scheel		Goalie stats	John Lethemon

May 27	Idaho Steelheads	5-1	Toledo Walleye	Huntington Center	Recap
2		First period	1
2		Second period	0
1		Third period	0
Adam Scheel		Goalie stats	Sebastian Cossa, John Lethemon

Idaho won series 4-1

== Kelly Cup finals ==
=== (M1) Idaho Steelheads vs. (S4) Florida Everblades ===
June 3	Florida Everblades	3–2	OT	Idaho Steelheads	Idaho Central Arena	Recap
No scoring		First period		15:38 – pp – Dawson Barteaux (1)
Cole Moberg (2) – 07:06		Second period		No scoring
Blake Winiecki (9) – pp – 12:40		Third period		06:54 – Ryan Dmowski (9)
Oliver Chau (7) – 14:06		First overtime period		No scoring
Cam Johnson 35 saves / 37 shots		Goalie stats		Adam Scheel 33 saves / 36 shots

June 4	Florida Everblades	5–3	Idaho Steelheads	Idaho Central Arena	Recap
Ashton Calder (3) – pp – 19:40		First period	11:49 – Matt Register (1)
Logan Lambdin (7) – 0:50; Logan Lambdin (8) – 19:55		Second period	No scoring
Levko Koper (3) – 13:42; Ben Masella (3) – en – 19:31		Third period	15:36 – pp – Justin Misiak (2); 15:57 – Ty Pelton-Bryce (9)
Cam Johnson 24 saves / 27 shots		Goalie stats	Adam Scheel 31 saves / 35 shots

June 7	Idaho Steelheads	0–1	Florida Everblades	Hertz Arena	Recap
No scoring		First period	No scoring
No scoring		Second period	18:14 – Will Calverly (3)
No scoring		Third period	No scoring
Rémi Poirier 27 saves / 28 shots		Goalie stats	Cam Johnson 23 saves / 23 shots

June 9	Idaho Steelheads	3–4	Florida Everblades	Hertz Arena	Recap
No scoring		First period	16:11 – Sean Josling (9); 18:56 – Sean Josling (10)
Ryan Dmowski (10) – 05:55; Ryan Dmowski (11) – pp – 07:26		Second period	No scoring
A.J. White (6) – 0:21		Third period	04:19 – Stefan Leblanc (1); 07:59 – Tyler Irvine (10)
Rémi Poirier 30 saves / 34 shots		Goalie stats	Cam Johnson 32 saves / 35 shots

Florida won series 4-0

== Statistical leaders ==
=== Skaters ===
These are the top ten skaters based on points.

Player	Team	GP	G	A	Pts	+/–	PIM
Wade Murphy	Idaho Steelheads	20	12	8	20	+4	24
Sean Josling	Florida Everblades	22	10	10	20	+9	14
Owen Headrick	Idaho Steelheads	20	3	16	19	+3	8
Ryan Dmowski	Idaho Steelheads	19	11	7	18	0	14
Gordie Green	Toledo Walleye	13	9	9	18	+2	6
Ty Pelton-Byce	Idaho Steelheads	20	9	8	17	+8	4
Brandon Hawkins	Toledo Walleye	13	8	9	17	+4	10
Pavel Gogolev	Newfoundland Growlers	16	8	9	17	+2	12
Oliver Chau	Florida Everblades	19	7	10	17	+5	0
John McCarron	Florida Everblades	22	6	11	17	+3	30

GP = Games played; G = Goals; A = Assists; Pts = Points; +/– = Plus/minus; PIM = Penalty minutes

=== Goaltenders ===
This is a combined of the top five goaltenders based on goals against average and the top five goaltenders based on save percentage, with at least 400 minutes played. The table is sorted by GAA, and the criteria for inclusion are bolded.

Player	Team	GP	W	L	OTL	SA	GA	GAA	SV%	SO	TOI
Cam Johnson	Florida Everblades	22	16	4	2	640	50	**2.10**	**0.922**	4	1427
Adam Scheel	Idaho Steelheads	18	12	5	1	541	47	**2.60**	**0.913**	3	1086
Dryden McKay	Newfoundland Growlers	12	8	2	1	313	31	**2.72**	**0.901**	2	683
Beck Warm	Cincinnati Cyclones	10	4	5	0	323	28	**3.12**	**0.913**	1	539
Kevin Mandolese	Allen Americans	9	4	5	0	304	26	**3.13**	**0.914**	1	498

GP = Games played; W = Wins; L = Losses; OTL = Overtime Losses; SA = Shots against; GA = Goals against; GAA = Goals against average; SV% = Save percentage; SO = Shutouts; TOI = Time on ice (in minutes)
