= 2019 Kelly Cup playoffs =

Tournament details
- Dates: April 10 – June 4, 2019
- Teams: 16

Final positions
- Champions: Newfoundland Growlers
- Runners-up: Toledo Walleye

Tournament statistics
- Scoring leader(s): Zach O'Brien (Newfoundland) (29 points)

Awards
- MVP: Zach O'Brien (Newfoundland)

The 2019 Kelly Cup playoffs of the ECHL began in April 2019 following the conclusion of the 2018–19 ECHL regular season. The Kelly Cup was won by the expansion Newfoundland Growlers in six games over the Toledo Walleye.

== Playoff format ==
At the end of the regular season the top four teams in each division qualifies for the 2019 Kelly Cup playoffs and be seeded one through four based on highest point total earned in the season. Then the first two rounds of the playoffs are held within the division with the first seed facing the fourth seed and the second seed facing the third. The division champions then play each other in a conference championship. The Kelly Cup finals pits the Eastern Conference champion against the Western Conference champion. All four rounds are a best-of-seven format.

== Playoff seeds ==
After the regular season, 16 teams qualify for the playoffs. The Cincinnati Cyclones were the first team to qualify during the regular season on March 6, with the Florida Everblades qualifying shortly after on March 8. The Cyclones were the Western Conference regular season champions and the Brabham Cup winners with the best record in the ECHL. The Everblades earned the top seed in the Eastern Conference.

Final seeding:

=== Eastern Conference ===
==== North Division ====
1. Newfoundland Growlers – Division champions, 94 pts
2. Adirondack Thunder – 83 pts
3. Manchester Monarchs – 82 pts
4. Brampton Beast – 79 pts

==== South Division ====
1. Florida Everblades – Division champions, 106 pts
2. Orlando Solar Bears – 88 pts
3. South Carolina Stingrays – 76 pts
4. Jacksonville Icemen – 76 pts

=== Western Conference ===
==== Central Division ====
1. Cincinnati Cyclones – Brabham Cup winners, division champions, 110 pts
2. Toledo Walleye – 89 pts
3. Fort Wayne Komets – 82 pts
4. Kalamazoo Wings – 77 pts

==== Mountain Division ====
1. Tulsa Oilers – Division champions, 90 pts
2. Idaho Steelheads – 88 pts
3. Utah Grizzlies – 83 pts
4. Kansas City Mavericks – 78 pts

== Playoff bracket ==
Division Semifinals	Division Finals
N1	Newfoundland Growlers	4
N4	Brampton Beast	2
N1	Newfoundland Growlers	4
North Division
N3	Manchester Monarchs	2
N2	Adirondack Thunder	1
N3	Manchester Monarchs	4
Eastern Conference
S1	Florida Everblades	4
S4	Jacksonville Icemen	2
S1	Florida Everblades	4
South Division
S2	Orlando Solar Bears	1
S2	Orlando Solar Bears	4
S3	South Carolina Stingrays	1
C1	Cincinnati Cyclones	4
C4	Kalamazoo Wings	2
C1	Cincinnati Cyclones	1
Central Division
C2	Toledo Walleye	4
C2	Toledo Walleye	4
C3	Fort Wayne Komets	2
Western Conference
M1	Tulsa Oilers	4
M4	Kansas City Mavericks	3
M1	Tulsa Oilers	4
Mountain Division
M2	Idaho Steelheads	2
M2	Idaho Steelheads	4
M3	Utah Grizzlies	1

Conference Finals
N1	Newfoundland Growlers	4
S1	Florida Everblades	1
C2	Toledo Walleye	4
M1	Tulsa Oilers	3

Kelly Cup Finals
N1	Newfoundland Growlers	4
C2	Toledo Walleye	2

== Division semifinals ==
=== North Division ===
==== (1) Newfoundland Growlers vs. (4) Brampton Beast ====
April 12	Brampton Beast	1 – 2	Newfoundland Growlers	Mile One Centre	Recap
No scoring		First period	No scoring
No scoring		Second period	8:56 – Scott Pooley (1); 13:32 – Zach O'Brien (1)
Chris Martenet (1) – 2:04		Third period	No scoring
Étienne Marcoux 26 saves / 28 shots		Goalie stats	Michael Garteig 32 saves / 33 shots

April 13	Brampton Beast	1 – 2	OT	Newfoundland Growlers	Mile One Centre	Recap
No scoring		First period		No scoring
No scoring		Second period		14:25 – Semyon Der-Arguchintsev (1)
Daniel Ciampini (1) – 1:12		Third period		No scoring
No scoring		First overtime period		0:18 – Brady Ferguson (1)
Étienne Marcoux 40 saves / 42 shots		Goalie stats		Michael Garteig 22 saves / 23 shots

April 16	Newfoundland Growlers	3 – 2	2OT	Brampton Beast	CAA Centre	Recap
No scoring		First period		16:02 – Jonathan Racine (1)
No scoring		Second period		13:48 – pp – Aaron Luchuk (1)
Hudson Elynuik (1) – 1:11; Giorgio Estephan (1) – pp – 6:48		Third period		No scoring
Zach O'Brien (2) – 3:34		Second overtime period		No scoring
Michael Garteig 30 saves / 32 shots		Goalie stats		Étienne Marcoux 55 saves / 58 shots

April 18	Newfoundland Growlers	1 – 4	Brampton Beast	CAA Centre	Recap
No scoring		First period	19:48 – pp – David Vallorani (1)
No scoring		Second period	16:09 – Aaron Luchuk (2)
Hudson Elynuik (2) – pp – 1:15		Third period	15:25 – François Beauchemin (1); 19:18 – pp – Daniel Ciampini (2)
Michael Garteig 37 saves / 41 shots		Goalie stats	Étienne Marcoux 32 saves / 33 shots

April 20	Newfoundland Growlers	2 – 8	Brampton Beast	CAA Centre	Recap
No scoring		First period	7:51 – sh – David Vallorani (2); 11:26 – David Pacan (1); 13:32 – pp – Boston Leier (1)
Josh Kestner (1) – pp – 9:05; Marcus Power (1) – 9:48		Second period	No scoring
No scoring		Third period	3:01 – pp – Daniel Ciampini (3); 10:32 – Boston Leier (2); 11:45 – François Beauchemin (2); 14:08 – sh – en – David Pacan (2); 16:10 – Artur Tianulin (1)
Michael Garteig 17 saves / 24 shots		Goalie stats	Étienne Marcoux 42 saves / 44 shots

April 23	Brampton Beast	2 – 3	OT	Newfoundland Growlers	Mile One Centre	Recap
David Vallorani (3) – sh – 13:05		First period		11:43 – Scott Pooley (2)
Daniel Ciampini (4) – pp – 19:06		Second period		No scoring
No scoring		Third period		13:40 – pp – Scott Pooley (3)
No scoring		First overtime period		0:23 – pp – Samuel Jardine (1)
Étienne Marcoux 26 saves / 29 shots		Goalie stats		Michael Garteig 24 saves / 26 shots

Newfoundland won series 4–2

==== (2) Adirondack Thunder vs. (3) Manchester Monarchs ====
April 12	Manchester Monarchs	4 – 2	Adirondack Thunder	Cool Insuring Arena	Recap
Pierre-Luc Mercier (1) – 2:34		First period	12:15 – Brian Ward (1); 16:51 – James Henry (1)
Daniil Miromanov (1) – 18:33		Second period	No scoring
Nic Pierog (1) – 4:40; Daniil Miromanov (2) – pp – 9:11		Third period	No scoring
Charles Williams 50 saves / 52 shots		Goalie stats	Evan Cormier 23 saves / 27 shots

April 13	Manchester Monarchs	6 – 1	Adirondack Thunder	Cool Insuring Arena	Recap
Tony Cameranesi (1) – 18:52		First period	4:48 – pp – John Edwardh (1)
Nic Pierog (2) – 2:27; Kevin Dufour (2) – pp – 6:48; Bokondji Imama (1) – 14:25		Second period	No scoring
Michael Doherty (1) – 10:12; Pavel Jenyš (1) – 15:27		Third period	No scoring
Charles Williams 36 saves / 37 shots		Goalie stats	Alex Sakellaropoulos 29 saves / 35 shots

April 17	Adirondack Thunder	2 – 3	OT	Manchester Monarchs	SNHU Arena	Recap
No scoring		First period		14:52 – Drake Rymsha (1)
Cullen Bradshaw (1) – pp – 4:19; Cullen Bradshaw (2) – pp – 9:07		Second period		10:43 – Michael Doherty (2)
No scoring		Third period		No scoring
No scoring		First overtime period		6:17 – Kevin Dufour (2)
Evan Cormier 35 saves / 38 shots		Goalie stats		Charles Williams 28 saves / 30 shots

April 19	Adirondack Thunder	4 – 3	Manchester Monarchs	SNHU Arena	Recap
No scoring		First period	4:23 – Chris Carlisle (1); 19:23 – pp – Kevin Dufour (3)
Brian Ward (2) – 8:31		Second period	13:00 – sh – Nic Pierog (3)
Matt Salhany (1) – 3:53; James Henry (2) – pp – 5:51; Matt Salhany (2) – pp – 10:43		Third period	No scoring
Alex Sakellaropoulos 21 saves / 24 shots		Goalie stats	Charles Williams 33 saves / 37 shots

April 20	Adirondack Thunder	1 – 7	Manchester Monarchs	SNHU Arena	Recap
No scoring		First period	19:39 – Pierre-Luc Mercier (2)
Mike Szmatula (1) – 9:12		Second period	13:46 – pp – Kevin Dufour (4)
No scoring		Third period	0:24 – sh – Michael Doherty (3); 2:34 – pp – Pavel Jenyš (2); 7:35 – pp – Sam Kurker (1); 11:59 – sh – en – Michael Doherty (4); 14:17 – Kevin Dufour (5)
Alex Sakellaropoulos 25 saves / 31 shots		Goalie stats	Charles Williams 26 saves / 27 shots

Manchester won series 4–1

=== South Division ===
==== (1) Florida Everblades vs. (4) Jacksonville Icemen ====
April 11	Jacksonville Icemen	2 – 3	OT	Florida Everblades	Hertz Arena	Recap
Alexis D'Aoust (1) – 9:03; Christophe Lalancette (1) – pp – 11:43		First period		12:52 – pp – Justin Auger (1)
No scoring		Second period		No scoring
No scoring		Third period		13:09 – Matt Finn (1)
No scoring		First overtime period		6:59 – pp – Michael Downing (1)
Ken Appleby 33 saves / 36 shots		Goalie stats		Jeremy Helvig 21 saves / 23 shots

April 13	Jacksonville Icemen	1 – 4	Florida Everblades	Hertz Arena	Recap
No scoring		First period	4:37 – John McCarron (1); 6:04 – pp – Kyle Platzer (1)
Cameron Critchlow (1) – 10:09		Second period	No scoring
No scoring		Third period	12:59 – Logan Roe (1); 19:38 – en – Blake Winiecki (1)
Ken Appleby 31 saves / 34 shots		Goalie stats	Jeremy Helvig 18 saves / 19 shots

April 18	Florida Everblades	3 – 4	Jacksonville Icemen	VyStar Veterans Memorial Arena	Recap
Justin Auger (2) – 19:19		First period	No scoring
No scoring		Second period	4:11 – Garrett Ladd (1); 13:52 – Jacob Cederholm (1)
Alex Tonge (1) – 1:30; John McCarron (2) – 17:45		Third period	12:19 – Maxime Fortier (1); 12:33 – Maxime Fortier (2)
Jeremy Helvig 15 saves / 19 shots		Goalie stats	Ken Appleby 31 saves / 34 shots

April 19	Florida Everblades	1 – 3	Jacksonville Icemen	VyStar Veterans Memorial Arena	Recap
Michael Downing (2) – 15:17		First period	6:08 – Maxime Fortier (3); 9:44 – Cam Maclise (1)
No scoring		Second period	No scoring
No scoring		Third period	11:56 – pp – Kris Newbury (1)
Jeremy Helvig 15 saves / 18 shots		Goalie stats	Mikhail Berdin 36 saves / 37 shots

April 20	Florida Everblades	5 – 1	Jacksonville Icemen	VyStar Veterans Memorial Arena	Recap
No scoring		First period	Jake Randolph (1) – 17:13
14:23 – Ben Masella (1)		Second period	No scoring
1:15 – Blake Winiecki (2); 2:34 – Grant Arnold (1); 8:33 – Blake Winiecki (3); 14:40 – en – Ben Masella (2)		Third period	No scoring
Callum Booth 14 saves / 15 shots		Goalie stats	Ken Appleby 20 saves / 24 shots

April 22	Jacksonville Icemen	1 – 5	Florida Everblades	Hertz Arena	Recap
4:18 – Maxime Fortier (4)		First period	Blake Winiecki (4) – 1:49
No scoring		Second period	John McCarron (3) – 4:04; Tommy Thompson (1) – 4:58; Alex Tonge (2) – 6:41; Blake Winiecki (5) – 7:17
No scoring		Third period	No scoring
Mikhail Berdin 18 saves / 23 shots Ken Appleby 11 saves / 11 shots		Goalie stats	Callum Booth 22 saves / 23 shots

Florida won series 4–2

==== (2) Orlando Solar Bears vs. (3) South Carolina Stingrays ====
April 10	South Carolina Stingrays	2 – 0	Orlando Solar Bears	Amway Center	Recap
No scoring		First period	No scoring
Mason Mitchell (1) – 13:09		Second period	No scoring
Josh Gratton (1) – sh – en – 19:19		Third period	No scoring
Parker Milner 26 saves / 26 shots		Goalie stats	Connor Ingram 26 saves / 27 shots

April 12	South Carolina Stingrays	2 – 3	Orlando Solar Bears	Amway Center	Recap
No scoring		First period	No scoring
No scoring		Second period	2:42 – Tayler Thompson (1); 6:17 – Mitch Hults (1); 16:26 – pp – Mitch Hults (2)
Grant Besse (1) – 7:33; Tad Kozun (1) – pp – 12:45		Third period	No scoring
Parker Milner 33 saves / 36 shots		Goalie stats	Connor Ingram 25 saves / 27 shots

April 17	Orlando Solar Bears	4 – 3	2OT	South Carolina Stingrays	North Charleston Coliseum	Recap
Mitch Hults (2) – 11:41		First period		No scoring
No scoring		Second period		6:41 – Matt Nuttle (1)
Hunter Fejes (1) – 1:27; Brent Pedersen (1) – 9:26		Third period		11:53 – pp – Jordan Samuels-Thomas (1); 14:27 – Jonathan Charbonneau (1)
Hunter Fejes (2) – 10:23		Second overtime period		No scoring
Connor Ingram 55 saves / 58 shots		Goalie stats		Parker Milner 48 saves / 52 shots

April 19	Orlando Solar Bears	4 – 1	South Carolina Stingrays	North Charleston Coliseum	Recap
No scoring		First period	No scoring
Tayler Thompson (2) – 2:45; Chris LeBlanc (1) – 6:06; Chris LeBlanc (2) – 12:03		Second period	No scoring
Colby McAuley (1) – 17:25		Third period	10:49 – Jonathan Charbonneau (2)
Connor Ingram 26 saves / 27 shots		Goalie stats	Parker Milner 27 saves / 31 shots

April 20	Orlando Solar Bears	5 – 2	South Carolina Stingrays	North Charleston Coliseum	Recap
4:43 – Tayler Thompson (3); 10:12 – pp – Hunter Fejes (3)		First period	No scoring
9:25 – pp – Troy Bourke (1); 18:06 – Jonne Tammela (1)		Second period	Kevin McKernan (1) – 0:13; Grant Besse (2) – pp – 16:59
16:57 – en – Hunter Fejes (4)		Third period	No scoring
Connor Ingram 28 saves / 30 shots		Goalie stats	Parker Milner 25 saves / 29 shots

Orlando won series 4–1

=== Central Division ===
==== (1) Cincinnati Cyclones vs. (4) Kalamazaoo Wings ====
April 12	Kalamazoo Wings	4 – 7	Cincinnati Cyclones	U.S. Bank Arena	Recap
Kyle Thomas (1) – 2:16; Chad McDonald (1) – 11:37		First period	9:21 – pp – Mitch Jones (1); 11:23 – Myles Powell (1); 16:19 – Pascal Aquin (1)
Chris Collins (1) – pp – 15:58		Second period	0:30 – pp – Jesse Schultz (1); 5:51 – Vasili Glotov (1); 17:31 – Judd Peterson (1); 19:24 – Tobie Bisson (1)
Kyle Thomas (2) – pp – 3:20		Third period	No scoring
Ivan Kulbakov 14 saves / 19 shots Jake Hildebrand 17 saves / 19 shots		Goalie stats	Michael Houser 24 saves / 28 shots

April 13	Kalamazoo Wings	2 – 0	Cincinnati Cyclones	U.S. Bank Arena	Recap
No scoring		First period	No scoring
Reid Gardiner (1) – pp – 3:08		Second period	No scoring
Chris Collins (2) – 10:36		Third period	No scoring
Jake Hildebrand 31 saves / 31 shots		Goalie stats	Michael Houser 24 saves / 26 shots

April 17	Cincinnati Cyclones	4 – 1	Kalamazoo Wings	Wings Event Center	Recap
Judd Peterson (2) – 9:38		First period	No scoring
Ben Johnson (1) – sh – 11:47		Second period	No scoring
Jesse Schultz (2) – pp – 2:54; Alex Wideman (1) – pp – 7:28		Third period	5:10 – pp – Kyle Bushee (1)
Michael Houser 28 saves / 29 shots		Goalie stats	Jake Hildebrand 20 saves / 24 shots

April 19	Cincinnati Cyclones	4 – 3	Kalamazoo Wings	Wings Event Center	Recap
No scoring		First period	4:42 – Kyle Blaney (1)
Eric Knodel (1) – pp – 5:28; Mitch Jones (2) – 10:44		Second period	15:37 – Jagger Dirk (1)
Myles Powell (2) – 6:20; Alex Wideman (2) – pp – 17:54		Third period	15:07 – Dominic Zombo (1)
Michael Houser 33 saves / 36 shots		Goalie stats	Ivan Kulbakov 27 saves / 31 shots

April 20	Cincinnati Cyclones	1 – 2	Kalamazoo Wings	Wings Event Center	Recap
No scoring		First period	13:11 – pp – Tanner Sorenson (1)
Ben Johnson (2) – 15:16		Second period	0:42 – Brendan Bradley (1)
No scoring		Third period	No scoring
Michael Houser 32 saves / 34 shots		Goalie stats	Jake Hildebrand 20 saves / 21 shots

April 23	Kalamazoo Wings	0 – 4	Cincinnati Cyclones	U.S. Bank Arena	Recap
No scoring		First period	Jesse Schultz (3) – pp – 1:15
No scoring		Second period	Justin Vaive (1) – 3:11; Justin Vaive (2) – 8:01
No scoring		Third period	Brady Vail (1) – en – 18:24
Jake Hildebrand 17 saves / 20 shots		Goalie stats	Michael Houser 30 saves / 30 shots

Cincinnati won series 4–2

==== (2) Toledo Walleye vs. (3) Fort Wayne Komets ====
April 12	Fort Wayne Komets	2 – 3	Toledo Walleye	Huntington Center	Recap
No scoring		First period	9:16 – Matthew Register (1)
No scoring		Second period	No scoring
Jake Kamrass (1) – 4:42; Brady Shaw (1) – pp – 18:34		Third period	9:26 – Bryan Moore (1); 9:49 – Greg Wolfe (1)
Zachary Fucale 35 saves / 38 shots		Goalie stats	Pat Nagle 28 saves / 30 shots

April 13	Fort Wayne Komets	0 – 6	Toledo Walleye	Huntington Center	Recap
No scoring		First period	5:26 – Greg Wolfe (2); 19:50 – Ben Danford (1)
No scoring		Second period	2:24 – pp – Shane Berschbach (1); 4:02 – pp – Tyler Spezia (1); 19:51 – pp – Randy Gazzola (1)
No scoring		Third period	18:57 – pp – Zach Gallant (1)
Zachary Fucale 37 saves / 43 shots		Goalie stats	Pat Nagle 23 saves / 23 shots

April 17	Toledo Walleye	1 – 2	OT	Fort Wayne Komets	Allen County War Memorial Coliseum	Recap
No scoring		First period		No scoring
No scoring		Second period		No scoring
Zach Gallant (2) – 9:34		Third period		19:38 – Shawn Szydlowski (1)
No scoring		First overtime period		18:01 – Kevin Gibson (1)
Pat Nagle 41 saves / 43 shots		Goalie stats		Zachary Fucale 41 saves / 42 shots

April 19	Toledo Walleye	5 – 1	Fort Wayne Komets	Allen County War Memorial Coliseum	Recap
David Pope (1) – pp – 7:36		First period	No scoring
Dylan Sadowy (1) – 3:52; Zach Gallant (3) – 10:38		Second period	12:16 – Craig Cescon (1)
Bryan Moore (2) – 11:15; Ben Danford (2) – en – 16:44		Third period	No scoring
Pat Nagle 23 saves / 24 shots		Goalie stats	Zachary Fucale 17 saves / 21 shots

April 20	Fort Wayne Komets	5 – 3	Toledo Walleye	Huntington Center	Recap
Mason Baptista (1) – pp – 18:22		First period	No scoring
Anthony Nellis (1) – 2:23; Brady Shaw (2) – pp – 12:52		Second period	10:10 – Zach Gallant (4); 18:02 – pp – Matthew Register (2)
J.C. Campagna (1) – pp – 6:02; Anthony Petruzzelli (1) – en – 19:24		Third period	13:20 – Kevin Tansey (1)
Zachary Fucale 32 saves / 35 shots		Goalie stats	Pat Nagle 20 saves / 24 shots

April 23	Toledo Walleye	4 – 1	Fort Wayne Komets	Allen County War Memorial Coliseum	Recap
Shane Berschbach (2) – 18:41		First period	No scoring
No scoring		Second period	10:38 – pp – Brady Shaw (3)
Dylan Sadowy (2) – 3:57; Dylan Sadowy (3) – 12:44; Dylan Sadowy (4) – en – 18:38		Third period	No scoring
Pat Nagle 23 saves / 24 shots		Goalie stats	Zachary Fucale 41 saves / 44 shots

Toledo won series 4–2

=== Mountain Division ===
==== (1) Tulsa Oilers vs. (4) Kansas City Mavericks ====
April 11	Kansas City Mavericks	6 – 4	Tulsa Oilers	BOK Center	Recap
Greg Betzold (1) – pp – 16:25		First period	3:25 – Roman Ammirato (1); 7:29 – Stephen Perfetto (1)
Loren Ulett (1) – 6:41; Corey Durocher (1) – 11:54; C.J. Eick (1) – 19:41		Second period	No scoring
Jared VanWormer (1) – pp – 16:03; Joey Sides (1) – 19:08		Third period	0:34 – Alex Dostie (1); 5:17 – pp – Alex Dostie (2)
Mason McDonald 39 saves / 43 shots		Goalie stats	Devin Williams 26 saves / 32 shots

April 14	Kansas City Mavericks	2 – 3	OT	Tulsa Oilers	BOK Center	Recap
Corey Durocher (2) – 8:06		First period		No scoring
Joey Sides (2) – 13:03		Second period		No scoring
No scoring		Third period		6:49 – Adam Pleskach (1); 11:55 – Jared Thomas (1)
No scoring		First overtime period		8:54 – Stephen Perfetto (2)
Mason McDonald 42 saves / 45 shots		Goalie stats		Devin Williams 31 saves / 33 shots

April 17	Tulsa Oilers	2 – 3	Kansas City Mavericks	Silverstein Eye Centers Arena	Recap
No scoring		First period	1:15 – pp – Mark Cooper (1); 10:43 – pp – Mark Cooper (2)
Stephen Perfetto (3) – pp – 4:31; Eric Drapluk (1) – pp – 11:29		Second period	No scoring
No scoring		Third period	12:06 – Jared VanWormer (2)
Devin Williams 30 saves / 33 shots		Goalie stats	Mason McDonald 26 saves / 28 shots

April 19	Tulsa Oilers	4 – 3	Kansas City Mavericks	Silverstein Eye Centers Arena	Recap
No scoring		First period	18:08 – pp – Mark Cooper (3)
Stephen Perfetto (4) – 12:24		Second period	18:20 – Rocco Carzo (1)
Jared Thomas (2) – 2:59; Adam Pleskach (2) – 16:48; Alex Dostie (3) – en – 18:23		Third period	18:57 – Mark Cooper (4)
Devin Williams 24 saves / 27 shots		Goalie stats	Mason McDonald 30 saves / 33 shots

April 20	Tulsa Oilers	3 – 4	Kansas City Mavericks	Silverstein Eye Centers Arena	Recap
No scoring		First period	No scoring
12:01 – Alex Dostie (4); 13:06 – Eric Drapluk (2)		Second period	Jared VanWormer (3) – 7:18; Loren Ulett (2) – 12:13; Corey Durocher (3) – 16:02; Darian Dziurzynski (1) – pp – 17:38
2:50 – Tanner Kaspick (1)		Third period	No scoring
Devin Williams 22 saves / 26 shots		Goalie stats	Mason McDonald 30 saves / 33 shots

April 23	Kansas City Mavericks	2 – 4	Tulsa Oilers	BOK Center	Recap
12:06 – Corey Durocher (4)		First period	Adam Pleskach (3) – 14:14; Alex Dostie (5)
1:10 – Corey Durocher (5)		Second period	Steven Kaunisto (1) – pp – 12:38; Alex Dostie (6) – 17:23
No scoring		Third period	No scoring
Mason McDonald 27 saves / 31 shots		Goalie stats	Devin Williams 25 saves / 27 shots

April 24	Kansas City Mavericks	2 – 6	Tulsa Oilers	BOK Center	Recap
Jared VanWormer (4) – 15:33		First period	13:33 – Ryan Tesink (1); 17:24 – pp – Adam Pleskach (4)
No scoring		Second period	0:35 – Alex Dostie (7); 1:16 – Ryan Tesink (2)
Darian Dziurzynski (2) – 3:07		Third period	4:38 – Alex Dostie (8); 16:53 – pp – Alex Dostie (9)
Mason McDonald 33 saves / 39 shots		Goalie stats	Devin Williams 25 saves / 27 shots

Tulsa won series 4–3

==== (2) Idaho Steelheads vs. (3) Utah Grizzlies ====
April 12	Utah Grizzlies	7 – 1	Idaho Steelheads	CenturyLink Arena	Recap
Jake Marchment (1) – 4:59; Josh Dickinson (1) – 17:59; Jack Walker (1) – 19:31		First period	8:33 – A.J. White (1)
Caleb Herbert (1) – pp – 4:26; Josh Dickinson (2) – 11:27		Second period	No scoring
Austin Carroll (1) – 6:02; Travis Barron (1) – 6:10		Third period	No scoring
Kevin Carr 35 saves / 36 shots		Goalie stats	Tomas Sholl 17 saves / 24 shots Ryan Faragher 5 saves / 5 shots

April 13	Utah Grizzlies	2 – 3	OT	Idaho Steelheads	CenturyLink Arena	Recap
Mike Economos (1) – 9:13		First period		5:53 – pp – Kale Kessy (1)
Caleb Herbert (2) – pp – 4:26		Second period		No scoring
No scoring		Third period		10:36 – Henrik Samuelsson (1)
No scoring		First overtime period		7:56 – Kale Kessy (2)
Kevin Carr 43 saves / 46 shots		Goalie stats		Tomas Sholl 35 saves / 37 shots

April 17	Idaho Steelheads	3 – 2	OT	Utah Grizzlies	Maverik Center	Recap
Brad McClure (1) – 19:53		First period		6:39 – sh – Josh Dickinson (3)
No scoring		Second period		No scoring
Henrik Samuelsson (2) – 5:50		Third period		2:52 – Tim McGauley (1)
Kyle Schempp (1) – 11:38		First overtime period		No scoring
Tomas Sholl 38 saves / 40 shots		Goalie stats		Kevin Carr 45 saves / 48 shots

April 19	Idaho Steelheads	5 – 4	OT	Utah Grizzlies	Maverik Center	Recap
No scoring		First period		5:38 – pp – Tim McGauley (2)
Keegan Kanzig (1) – 0:36; Henrik Samuelsson (3) – 10:31; Steven McParland (1) – 19:54		Second period		1:54 – Tim McGauley (3); 4:36 – Tim McGauley (4); 5:41 – pp – Grayson Downing (1)
Henrik Samuelsson (4) – 15:15		Third period		No scoring
Brad McClure (2) – 8:05		First overtime period		No scoring
Tomas Sholl 32 saves / 36 shots		Goalie stats		Kevin Carr 36 saves / 41 shots

April 20	Idaho Steelheads	2 – 1	OT	Utah Grizzlies	Maverik Center	Recap
No scoring		First period		No scoring
16:33 – James Phelan (1)		Second period		Joey Ratelle (1) – 10:17
No scoring		Third period		No scoring
12:37 – Kyle Schempp (2)		First overtime period		No scoring
Tomas Sholl 23 saves / 24 shots		Goalie stats		Kevin Carr 44 saves / 46 shots

Idaho won series 4–1

== Division finals ==
=== North Division ===
==== (1) Newfoundland Growlers vs. (3) Manchester Monarchs ====
April 26	Manchester Monarchs	3 – 2	Newfoundland Growlers	Mile One Centre	Recap
Bokondji Imama (2) – 12:47		First period	16:17 – pp – Zach O'Brien (3)
No scoring		Second period	10:27 – Marcus Power (2)
Kevin Dufour (6) – 8:58; Bokondji Imama (3) – 11:50		Third period	No scoring
Charles Williams 29 saves / 31 shots		Goalie stats	Michael Garteig 25 saves / 28 shots

April 27	Manchester Monarchs	2 – 4	Newfoundland Growlers	Mile One Centre	Recap
Craig Wyszomirsk (1) – 5:11		First period	7:47 – pp – Josh Kestner (2)
No scoring		Second period	No scoring
Pavel Jenyš (3) – 13:42		Third period	12:47 – pp – Brady Ferguson (2); 18:31 – Zach O'Brien (4); 19:35 – en – Derian Plouffe (1)
Charles Williams 27 saves / 30 shots		Goalie stats	Michael Garteig 22 saves / 24 shots

April 30	Newfoundland Growlers	4 – 2	Manchester Monarchs	SNHU Arena	Recap
Giorgio Estephan (2) – 18:41		First period	No scoring
Scott Pooley (4) – 5:36		Second period	No scoring
Matt Bradley (1) – 7:29; Zach O'Brien (5) – en – 17:36		Third period	16:40 – Kevin Dufour (7); 19:54 – en – Michael Doherty (5)
Michael Garteig 39 saves / 41 shots		Goalie stats	Charles Williams 20 saves / 23 shots

May 1	Newfoundland Growlers	4 – 3	Manchester Monarchs	SNHU Arena	Recap
No scoring		First period	11:28 – Cory Ward (1)
Josh Kestner (3) – 6:50; Zach O'Brien (6) – pp – 13:55; Brady Ferguson (3) – pp – 17:26		Second period	17:32 – Pierre-Luc Mercier (3)
Giorgio Estephan (3) – pp – 5:25		Third period	6:44 – Pierre-Luc Mercier (4)
Michael Garteig 44 saves / 47 shots		Goalie stats	Charles Williams 29 saves / 33 shots

May 3	Newfoundland Growlers	1 – 2	OT	Manchester Monarchs	The Rinks at Exeter	Recap
No scoring		First period		No scoring
14:34 – Zach O'Brien (7)		Second period		David Kolomatis (1) – pp – 11:30
No scoring		Third period		No scoring
No scoring		First overtime period		Pierre-Luc Mercier (5) – 2:16
Michael Garteig 30 saves / 32 shots		Goalie stats		Charles Williams 30 saves / 31 shots

May 6	Manchester Monarchs	1 – 5	Newfoundland Growlers	Mile One Centre	Recap
No scoring		First period	Zach O'Brien (8) – 4:52; Zach O'Brien (9) – 17:20; Matt Bradley (2) – 17:41
No scoring		Second period	Garrett Johnston (1) – 5:14; Zach O'Brien (10) – pp – 7:10
5:42 – Tony Cameranesi (2)		Third period	No scoring
Charles Williams 11 saves / 16 shots Cole Kehler 13 saves / 13 shots		Goalie stats	Michael Garteig 36 saves / 37 shots

Newfoundland won series 4–2

=== South Division ===
==== (1) Florida Everblades vs. (2) Orlando Solar Bears ====
April 26	Orlando Solar Bears	2 – 1	OT	Florida Everblades	Hertz Arena	Recap
No scoring		First period		No scoring
No scoring		Second period		3:49 – Riley Weselowski (1)
Hunter Fejes (5) – 9:57		Third period		No scoring
Colby McAuley (2) – 0:55		First overtime period		No scoring
Connor Ingram 29 saves / 30 shots		Goalie stats		Callum Booth 25 saves / 27 shots

April 27	Orlando Solar Bears	2 – 3	OT	Florida Everblades	Hertz Arena	Recap
No scoring		First period		15:46 – Ben Masella (3)
No scoring		Second period		0:57 – pp – Blake Winiecki (6)
Chris LeBlanc (3) – 6:03; Brent Pedersen (2) – 10:36		Third period		No scoring
No scoring		First overtime period		12:08 – Tommy Thompson (2)
Connor Ingram 29 saves / 32 shots		Goalie stats		Callum Booth 41 saves / 43 shots

April 30	Florida Everblades	3 – 2	OT	Orlando Solar Bears	Amway Center	Recap
No scoring		First period		2:00 – Zach Frye (1); 16:52 – Hunter Fejes (6)
No scoring		Second period		No scoring
Blake Winiecki (7) – 5:35; Nathan Perkovich (1) – 9:14		Third period		No scoring
John McCarron (4) – pp – 4:08		First overtime period		No scoring
Callum Booth 31 saves / 33 shots		Goalie stats		Connor Ingram 30 saves / 33 shots

May 2	Florida Everblades	4 – 0	Orlando Solar Bears	Amway Center	Recap
Blake Winiecki (8) – pp – 16:03		First period	No scoring
Justin Auger (3) – 7:44		Second period	No scoring
Logan Roe (2) – pp – 2:14; Ben Masella (4) – 9:08		Third period	No scoring
Callum Booth 33 saves / 33 shots		Goalie stats	Connor Ingram 19 saves / 23 shots

May 3	Florida Everblades	2 – 1	2OT	Orlando Solar Bears	Amway Center	Recap
14:02 – Michael Downing (3)		First period		Hunter Fejes (7) – sh – 6:53
No scoring		Second period		No scoring
No scoring		Third period		No scoring
14:48 – John McCarron (5)		Second overtime period		No scoring
Callum Booth 48 saves / 49 shots		Goalie stats		Connor Ingram 49 saves / 51 shots

Florida won series 4–1

=== Central Division ===
==== (1) Cincinnati Cyclones vs. (2) Toledo Walleye ====
April 25	Toledo Walleye	3 – 2	Cincinnati Cyclones	U.S. Bank Arena	Recap
A.J. Jenks (1) – 19:10		First period	No scoring
Dylan Sadowy (5) – pp – 0:54		Second period	No scoring
Shane Berschbach (3) – 19:04		Third period	15:31 – Ben Johnson (3); 18:17 – Judd Peterson (3)
Pat Nagle 36 saves / 38 shots		Goalie stats	Michael Houser 17 saves / 20 shots

April 27	Cincinnati Cyclones	4 – 2	Toledo Walleye	Huntington Center	Recap
5:32 – Vasili Glotov (2)		First period	Greg Wolfe (3) – pp – 7:29
7:21 – pp – Myles Powell (3)		Second period	No scoring
19:31 – pp – Myles Powell (4); 19:51 – pp – en – Judd Peterson (4)		Third period	Matthew Register (3) – pp – 7:41
Michael Houser 31 saves / 33 shots		Goalie stats	Pat Nagle 18 saves / 21 shots

May 1	Cincinnati Cyclones	1 – 5	Toledo Walleye	Huntington Center	Recap
Brady Vail (2) – 14:32		First period	No scoring
No scoring		Second period	10:36 – Bryan Moore (3); 14:36 – Greg Wolfe (4)
No scoring		Third period	13:50 – pp – Bryan Moore (4); 19:35 – en – Trevor Hamilton (1); 19:56 – Greg Wolfe (5)
Michael Houser 33 saves / 37 shots		Goalie stats	Pat Nagle 31 saves / 32 shots

May 3	Cincinnati Cyclones	2 – 3	Toledo Walleye	Huntington Center	Recap
No scoring		First period	No scoring
Tobie Bisson (2) – 4:25		Second period	8:59 – Trevor Hamilton (2); 14:25 – Trevor Hamilton (3)
Justin Vaive (3) – pp – 1:35		Third period	15:22 – Bryan Moore (5)
Michael Houser 34 saves / 37 shots		Goalie stats	Pat Nagle 25 saves / 27 shots

May 4	Toledo Walleye	2 – 1	Cincinnati Cyclones	U.S. Bank Arena	Recap
No scoring		First period	19:27 – Devante Stephens (1)
A.J. Jenks (2) – pp – 3:19; Greg Wolfe (5) – 3:42		Second period	No scoring
No scoring		Third period	No scoring
Pat Nagle 36 saves / 37 shots		Goalie stats	Michael Houser 25 saves / 27 shots

Toledo won series 4–1

=== Mountain Division ===
==== (1) Tulsa Oilers vs. (2) Idaho Steelheads ====
April 26	Idaho Steelheads	1 – 3	Tulsa Oilers	BOK Center	Recap
Henrik Samuelsson (5) – 5:02		First period	14:54 – Adam Pleskach (5); 17:48 – pp – Alex Dostie (10)
No scoring		Second period	No scoring
No scoring		Third period	18:44 – en – Adam Pleskach (6)
Tomas Sholl 23 saves / 25 shots		Goalie stats	Devin Williams 33 saves / 34 shots

April 28	Idaho Steelheads	1 – 3	Tulsa Oilers	BOK Center	Recap
No scoring		First period	3:18 – Stephen Perfetto (5)
Brad McClure (3) – pp – 9:22		Second period	No scoring
No scoring		Third period	8:09 – pp – Adam Pleskach (7); 18:46 – en – Adam Pleskach (8)
Tomas Sholl 34 saves / 36 shots		Goalie stats	Devin Williams 24 saves / 25 shots

April 30	Tulsa Oilers	1 – 0	Idaho Steelheads	CenturyLink Arena	Recap
No scoring		First period	No scoring
Stephen Perfetto (6) – pp – 11:33		Second period	No scoring
No scoring		Third period	No scoring
Devin Williams 36 saves / 36 shots		Goalie stats	Tomas Sholl 26 saves / 27 shots

May 1	Tulsa Oilers	2 – 4	Idaho Steelheads	CenturyLink Arena	Recap
No scoring		First period	1:57 – A.J. White (2); 10:15 – Reid Petryk (1); 10:42 – Steven McParland (2)
Alex Dostie (11) – pp – 12:06		Second period	No scoring
Charlie Sampair (1) – 5:58		Third period	5:30 – Mitch Moroz (1)
Devin Williams 34 saves / 38 shots		Goalie stats	Tomas Sholl 33 saves / 35 shots

May 3	Tulsa Oilers	1 – 3	Idaho Steelheads	CenturyLink Arena	Recap
No scoring		First period	No scoring
No scoring		Second period	No scoring
12:01 – Mike McKee (1)		Third period	Reid Petryk (2) – 4:07; A.J. White (3) – 8:33; Nolan Gluchowski (1) – 8:49
Devin Williams 33 saves / 36 shots		Goalie stats	Tomas Sholl 34 saves / 35 shots

May 5	Idaho Steelheads	1 – 3	Tulsa Oilers	BOK Center	Recap
7:28 – Robbie Payne (1)		First period	Ryan Tesink (3) – 2:41
No scoring		Second period	Adam Pleskach (9) – 10:02
No scoring		Third period	Adam Pleskach (10) – en – 18:17
Tomas Sholl 28 saves / 30 shots		Goalie stats	Devin Williams 27 saves / 28 shots

Tulsa won series 4–2

== Conference finals ==
=== Eastern Conference ===
==== (S1) Florida Everblades vs. (N1) Newfoundland Growlers ====
May 10	Newfoundland Growlers	2 – 0	Florida Everblades	Hertz Arena	Recap
No scoring		First period	No scoring
No scoring		Second period	No scoring
Giorgio Estephan (4) – 13:20; Zach O'Brien (11) – en – 19:46		Third period	No scoring
Michael Garteig 32 saves / 32 shots		Goalie stats	Callum Booth 29 saves / 30 shots

May 11	Newfoundland Growlers	5 – 1	Florida Everblades	Hertz Arena	Recap
No scoring		First period	10:17 – pp – Blake Winiecki (9)
Scott Pooley (5) – 3:04; Josh Kestner (4) – 4:39; Marcus Power (3) – pp – 11:30; J.J. Piccinich (1) – 18:17		Second period	No scoring
Hudson Elynuik (3) – 17:24		Third period	No scoring
Michael Garteig 34 saves / 35 shots		Goalie stats	Callum Booth 25 saves / 29 shots

May 15	Florida Everblades	5 – 4	Newfoundland Growlers	Mile One Centre	Recap
Michael Downing (4) – 8:52; Matt Finn (2) – 13:52; Mike Neville (1) – 16:46		First period	2:32 – Scott Pooley (6)
Blake Winiecki (10) – 8:19		Second period	2:44 – Brady Ferguson (4); 12:24 – Josh Kestner (5)
Blake Winiecki (11) – 16:42		Third period	0:31 – pp – Giorgio Estephan (5)
Callum Booth 24 saves / 29 shots		Goalie stats	Michael Garteig 20 saves / 25 shots

May 17	Florida Everblades	0 – 6	Newfoundland Growlers	Mile One Centre	Recap
No scoring		First period	14:19 – Zach O'Brien (12); 19:04 – Josh Kestner (6)
No scoring		Second period	10:27 – Zach O'Brien (13); 13:06 – pp – Giorgio Estephan (6); 15:50 – pp – Brady Ferguson (5); 18:29 – pp – Zach O'Brien (14)
No scoring		Third period	No scoring
Callum Booth 20 saves / 26 shots Jeremy Helvig 3 saves / 3 shots		Goalie stats	Michael Garteig 28 saves / 28 shots

May 18	Florida Everblades	0 – 3	Newfoundland Growlers	Mile One Centre	Recap
No scoring		First period	No scoring
No scoring		Second period	Scott Pooley (7) – 18:03
No scoring		Third period	Hudson Elynuik (4) – 7:43; Giorgio Estephan (7) – 12:35
Callum Booth 20 saves / 23 shots		Goalie stats	Michael Garteig 36 saves / 36 shots

Newfoundland won series 4–1

=== Western Conference ===
==== (M1) Tulsa Oilers vs. (C2) Toledo Walleye ====
May 10	Tulsa Oilers	2 – 6	Toledo Walleye	Huntington Center	Recap
6:13 - Tanner Kaspick (2); 17:03 - Stephen Perfetto (7)		First period	Kevin Tansey (2) - 5:26
No scoring		Second period	Trevor Hamilton (4) - 6:12; Trevor Hamilton (5) - pp - 17:47
No scoring		Third period	David Pope (2) - 2:51; Dylan Sadowy (6) - 14:15; Bryan Moore (6) – 19:35
Devin Williams 21 saves / 25 shots Evan Fitzpatrick 1 save / 3 shots		Goalie stats	Pat Nagle 29 saves / 31 shots

May 12	Tulsa Oilers	1 – 4	Toledo Walleye	Huntington Center	Recap
No scoring		First period	David Pope (3) – 14:16; Chris Crane (1) – 15:39
No scoring		Second period	A.J. Jenks (3) – pp – 12:37; Greg Wolfe (7) – 19:37
11:31 – Charlie Sampair (2)		Third period	No scoring
Evan Fitzpatrick 19 saves / 23 shots Ian Keserich 8 saves / 8 shots		Goalie stats	Pat Nagle 39 saves / 40 shots

May 15	Toledo Walleye	1 – 4	Tulsa Oilers	BOK Center	Recap
No scoring		First period	Alex Dostie (12) – 13:09
No scoring		Second period	No scoring
7:26 – Dylan Sadowy (7)		Third period	Adam Pleskach (11) – pp – 1:11; Ryan Tesink (4) – 17:43; Tanner Kaspick (3) – en – 19:59
Pat Nagle 32 saves / 35 shots		Goalie stats	Devin Williams 29 saves / 30 shots

May 17	Toledo Walleye	1 – 2	OT	Tulsa Oilers	BOK Center	Recap
17:39 – Brenden Kotyk (1)		First period		No scoring
No scoring		Second period		Alex Dostie (13) – pp – 8:49
No scoring		Third period		No scoring
No scoring		First overtime period		Charlie Sampair (3) – 9:41
Pat Nagle 35 saves / 37 shots		Goalie stats		Devin Williams 39 saves / 40 shots

May 18	Toledo Walleye	4 – 1	Tulsa Oilers	BOK Center	Recap
Shane Berschbach (4) – 11:52; A.J. Jenks (4) – sh – 17:38		First period	9:43 – pp – Adam Pleskach (12)
Tyler Spezia (2) – pp – 10:28		Second period	No scoring
Shane Berschbach (5) – en – 19:53		Third period	No scoring
Pat Nagle 29 saves / 30 shots		Goalie stats	Devin Williams 15 saves / 17 shots Ian Keserich 19 saves / 20 shots

May 20	Tulsa Oilers	4 – 2	Toledo Walleye	Huntington Center	Recap
Scott Henegar (1) – 4:07; Stephen Perfetto (8) – 5:45		First period	No scoring
No scoring		Second period	0:52 – sh – Ben Storm (1); 1:57 – Ryan Obuchowski (1)
Charlie Sampair (4) – 13:13; Alex Dostie (14) – en – 19:31		Third period	No scoring
Ian Keserich 29 saves / 31 shots		Goalie stats	Pat Nagle 24 saves / 27 shots

May 22	Toledo Walleye	6 – 2	Tulsa Oilers	BOK Center	Recap
David Pope (4) – 4:10; Zach Gallant (5) – 9:29; Chris Crane (2) – 17:14		First period	12:24 – pp – Stephen Perfetto (9)
Matthew Register (4) – 13:28		Second period	19:33 – Jared Thomas (3)
Bryan Moore (7) – en – 17:55; Ben Storm (2) – 18:41		Third period	No scoring
Pat Nagle 24 saves / 26 shots		Goalie stats	Ian Keserich 27 saves / 32 shots

Toledo won series 4–3

== Kelly Cup finals ==
=== (N1) Newfoundland Growlers vs. (C2) Toledo Walleye ===
May 25	Toledo Walleye	3 – 4	OT	Newfoundland Growlers	Mile One Centre	Recap
No scoring		First period		19:59 – Zach O'Brien (15)
No scoring		Second period		9:46 – Hudson Elynuik (5)
Chris Crane (3) – 6:28; Shane Berschbach (6) – pp – 8:30; Greg Wolfe (8) – 12:44		Third period		1:21 – Josh Kestner (7)
No scoring		First overtime period		4:58 – Josh Kestner (8)
Pat Nagle 34 saves / 38 shots		Goalie stats		Michael Garteig 30 saves / 33 shots

May 26	Toledo Walleye	1 – 2	OT	Newfoundland Growlers	Mile One Centre	Recap
No scoring		First period		No scoring
Shane Berschbach (7) – pp – 3:34		Second period		No scoring
No scoring		Third period		2:35 – pp – Scott Pooley (8)
No scoring		First overtime period		16:01 – Scott Pooley (9)
Pat Nagle 35 saves / 37 shots		Goalie stats		Michael Garteig 22 saves / 23 shots

May 29	Newfoundland Growlers	1 – 4	Toledo Walleye	Huntington Center	Recap
No scoring		First period	No scoring
Hudson Elynuik (6) – 4:01		Second period	14:05 – Zach Gallant (6); 15:38 – Greg Wolfe (9); 18:36 – pp – Shane Berschbach (8)
No scoring		Third period	11:32 – Shane Berschbach (9)
Michael Garteig 32 saves / 36 shots		Goalie stats	Pat Nagle 17 saves / 18 shots

May 31	Newfoundland Growlers	4 – 2	Toledo Walleye	Huntington Center	Recap
Brady Ferguson (6) – 8:51		First period	13:56 – pp – Greg Wolfe (10)
Brady Ferguson (7) – pp – 9:40		Second period	19:35 – Bryan Moore (8)
Kristiāns Rubīns (1) – 11:14; Matt Bradley (3) – 14:26		Third period	No scoring
Michael Garteig 37 saves / 39 shots		Goalie stats	Pat Nagle 26 saves / 30 shots

June 1	Newfoundland Growlers	2 – 3	Toledo Walleye	Huntington Center	Recap
13:12 – Marcus Power (4)		First period	Tyler Spezia (3) – 2:27
12:50 – Zach O'Brien (16)		Second period	Ryan Obuchowski (2) – sh – 8:58; A.J. Jenks (5) – 10:34
No scoring		Third period	No scoring
Michael Garteig 22 saves / 25 shots		Goalie stats	Pat Nagle 28 saves / 30 shots

June 4	Toledo Walleye	3 – 4	Newfoundland Growlers	Mile One Centre	Recap
No scoring		First period	Matt Bradley (4) – 18:31
2:39 – Kevin Tansey (3)		Second period	Josh Kestner (9) – 1:03; Giorgio Estephan (8) – 10:04; Giorgio Estephan (9) – 13:32
5:13 – Hunter Smith (1); 16:24 – A.J. Jenks (6)		Third period	No scoring
Pat Nagle 23 saves / 27 shots		Goalie stats	Michael Garteig 23 saves / 26 shots

Newfoundland won series 4–2

== Statistical leaders ==
=== Scoring leaders ===
These are the top eleven skaters based on points.

Player	Team	GP	G	A	Pts	+/–	PIM
Zach O'Brien	Newfoundland Growlers	23	16	13	29	+12	8
Stephen Perfetto	Tulsa Oilers	20	9	17	26	+3	6
Alex Dostie	Tulsa Oilers	20	14	10	24	+3	4
Giorgio Estephan	Newfoundland Growlers	23	9	15	24	+7	6
Brady Ferguson	Newfoundland Growlers	23	7	17	24	+7	18
Adam Pleskach	Tulsa Oilers	20	12	11	23	+1	20
Greg Wolfe	Toledo Walleye	24	10	11	21	+8	12
Shane Berschbach	Toledo Walleye	24	9	12	21	+4	8
Matthew Register	Toledo Walleye	24	4	15	19	+6	14
Scott Pooley	Newfoundland Growlers	23	9	8	17	+3	16
Dylan Sadowy	Toledo Walleye	24	7	10	17	+2	35

GP = Games played; G = Goals; A = Assists; Pts = Points; +/– = Plus/minus; PIM = Penalty minutes

=== Leading goaltenders ===
This is a combined table of the top five goaltenders based on goals against average and the top five goaltenders based on save percentage, with at least 240 minutes played. The table is sorted by GAA, and the criteria for inclusion are bolded.

Player	Team	GP	W	L	OTL	SA	GA	GAA	SV%	SO	TOI
Connor Ingram	Orlando Solar Bears	10	5	2	3	338	22	**1.94**	**0.935**	0	681
Pat Nagle	Toledo Walleye	24	14	6	4	729	50	**2.03**	**0.931**	1	1,481
Étienne Marcoux	Brampton Beast	6	2	1	3	234	13	**2.04**	**0.944**	0	383
Callum Booth	Florida Everblades	12	7	4	1	360	27	**2.17**	0.925	1	745
Michael Garteig	Newfoundland Growlers	23	16	6	1	726	52	**2.19**	**0.928**	3	1,423
Kevin Carr	Utah Grizzlies	5	1	0	4	217	14	2.47	**0.935**	0	340

GP = Games played; W = Wins; L = Losses; OTL = Overtime Losses; SA = Shots against; GA = Goals against; GAA = Goals against average; SV% = Save percentage; SO = Shutouts; TOI = Time on ice (in minutes)

== See also ==
- 2018–19 ECHL season
- List of ECHL seasons

Preceded by 2018 Kelly Cup playoffs	Kelly Cup Playoffs; 2019	Succeeded by ~~2020 Kelly Cup playoffs~~ Cancelled
