= Zach O'Brien =

Canadian ice hockey player

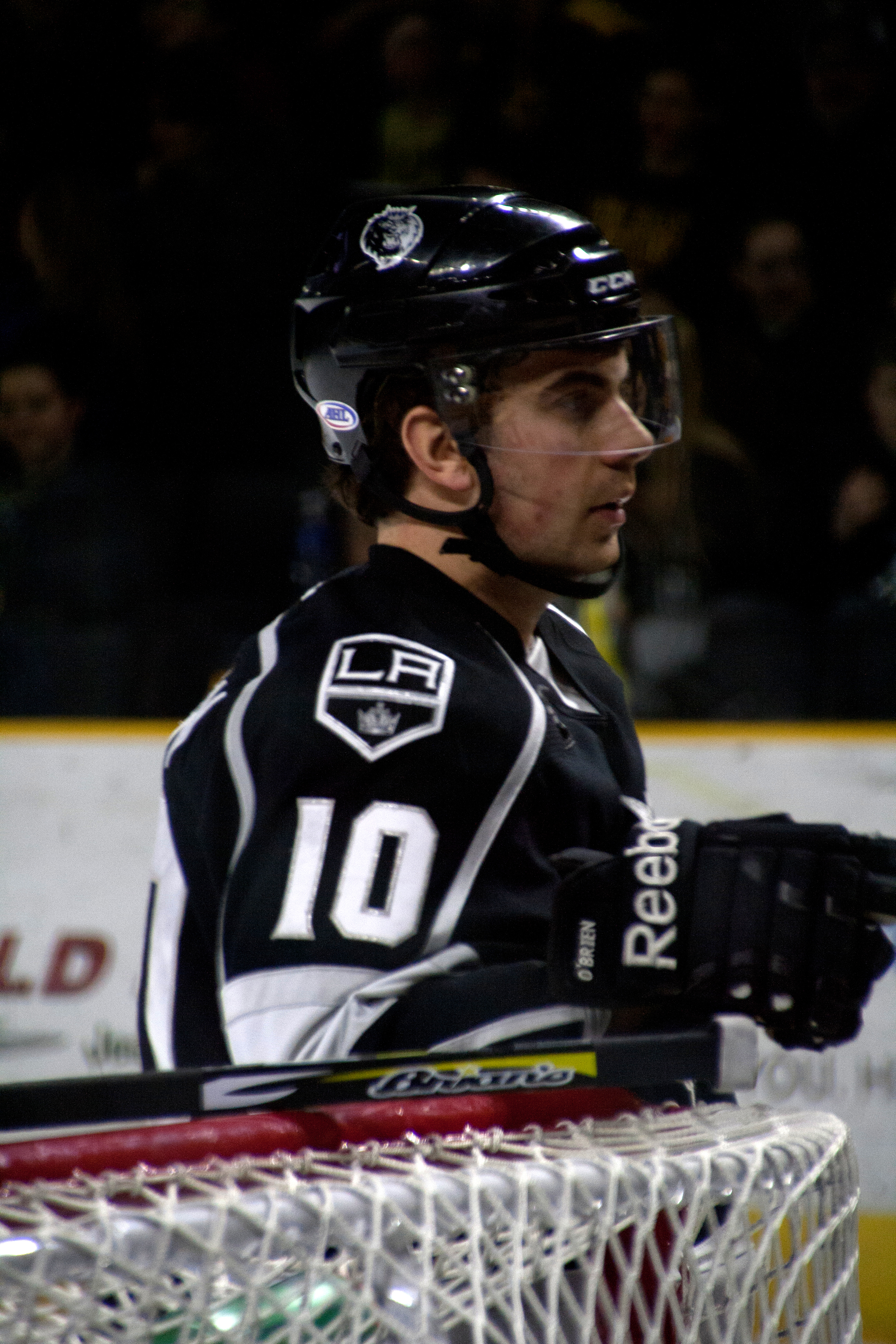
- O'Brien with the Manchester Monarchs in 2015
- Born: June 29, 1992 (age 34) St. John's, Newfoundland, Canada
- Height: 5 ft 11 in (180 cm)
- Weight: 192 lb (87 kg; 13 st 10 lb)
- Position: Right wing
- Shoots: Right
- EIHL team: Nottingham Panthers
- Played for: St. John's IceCaps; Manchester Monarchs; Chicago Wolves; Ravensburg Towerstars; Binghamton Senators; Bakersfield Condors; Toronto Marlies; EV Landshut; HC Slovan Bratislava; Newfoundland Growlers; Storhamar Hockey; Cardiff Devils
- NHL draft: Undrafted
- Playing career: 2011–present

Zachary O'Brien (born June 29, 1992) is a Canadian professional ice hockey winger currently playing with the Nottingham Panthers in the Elite Ice Hockey League.

Prior to turning professional, O'Brien played three seasons with the Acadie–Bathurst Titan of the Quebec Major Junior Hockey League (QMJHL). During his time with the Titan, O'Brien won the Frank J. Selke Memorial Trophy as the league's most sportsmanlike player twice.

== Playing career ==
=== Amateur ===
O'Brien played Major Midget hockey with the St. John's Fog Devils of the Newfoundland and Labrador Major Midget Hockey League. In his final year, he recorded 176 points to help lead his team to the 2010 Telus Cup where he was then named the National Midget AAA Championship's MVP.

Originally drafted by the Moncton Wildcats in the 2008 QMJHL Draft, O’Brien chose to complete high school before playing major junior hockey. O’Brien then played three years with the Acadie-Bathurst Titan who had acquired him in a trade.

While he was never drafted in the NHL, O'Brien was invited to the San Jose Sharks training camp in 2010. He then returned to the Acadie-Bathurst Titan for the 2010–11 season where he led all first year players in goals and points and set a new team record for goals scored. He also tied Réal Godin as the only player in QMJHL history to record no penalty minutes while accumulating at least 50 points in a season. As a result of his play, O'Brien was named to the 2011 Subway Super Series roster to play in an exhibition tournament against the Russian national junior team. He ended the season with a career-high 101 points and won the Frank J. Selke Memorial Trophy as the QMJHL most sportsmanlike player. He was also named a finalist for the RDS Cup as Rookie of the Year and Michel Bergeron Trophy as Offensive Rookie of the Year.

During the 2011–12 season, O'Brien scored four goals in six-minutes and 10-seconds in a 7–4 win over the Moncton Wildcats. On April 5, 2012, O'Brien signed an amateur tryout agreement with the St. John's IceCaps of the American Hockey League (AHL) but he returned to the Acadie-Bathurst Titan for the 2012–13 season as an assistant captain after playing one game. During that season, O'Brien broke his 186-game streak with no penalties in a 5–1 loss to the Moncton Wildcats. O'Brien was the recipient of the CHL Player of the Week for the first week of January for recording two hat tricks that week. He won the Frank J. Selke Memorial Trophy for the second time at the conclusion of the season, having only accrued two penalties that season.

=== Professional ===
Coming out of major juniors, O'Brien joined the Ontario Reign of the ECHL. He was loaned to the Manchester Monarchs for the rest of the 2013–14 season after playing in five games for the Reign. He signed a contract extension with the Monarchs on August 4, 2014, and won the Calder Cup with the team that season.

After winning the Calder Cup, O'Brien signed a one-year contract with the Chicago Wolves of the AHL on July 14, 2015. He was invited to the St. Louis Blues training camp on a professional tryout agreement, but began the 2015–16 season with the Wolves.

After playing in 20 games for the Ravensburg Towerstars, O'Brien opted to conclude the season in North America with the ECHL's Wichita Thunder. After playing in 24 games for the Wichita Thunder and recording 19 points, O'Brien was loaned to the Binghamton Senators of the AHL on March 23, 2017.

He signed an AHL contract with Bakersfield Condors on July 6, 2017, for the 2017–18 season and attended the Edmonton Oilers training camp on a professional tryout contract. After being cut from both the Oilers and Bakersfield Condors training camp he was reassigned to the Wichita Thunder of the ECHL to begin the season. His demotion was short-lived however as he was called up to the AHL on November 16, 2017.

On July 3, 2018, O'Brien signed a contract with the Toronto Marlies of the AHL. He attended the Marlies training camp but was assigned to their ECHL affiliate, the Newfoundland Growlers. Prior to the 2018–19 season, the Growlers inaugural season, O'Brien was named an alternate captain. While playing for the Growlers, O'Brien scored the first hat trick in franchise history to help beat the Reading Royals 5–4 on November 16, 2018. He scored his second hat trick with the Growlers in a 5–1 win over the Jacksonville Icemen on January 5, 2019. On February 25, O'Brien was recalled to the AHL along with teammates Hudson Elynuik, Brady Ferguson, and Josh Kestner. O'Brien was reassigned to the ECHL along with Kestner on February 28 where he then helped lead the Growlers to the 2019 Kelly Cup playoffs. He was subsequently awarded the June M. Kelly Award as MVP on June 5, after winning the Cup.

At the conclusion of his second season under contract within the Marlies organization, playing primarily with the Growlers, O'Brien opted for a second stint in the German DEL2, agreeing to a contract with EV Landshut on June 15, 2020. In his lone season in Germany, O'Brien was prolific in adding an offensive presence with Landshut, posting 40 goals and 83 points through just 49 regular season games of the 2020–21 season. He was unable to propel Landshut into the post-season, finishing in 10th.

As a free agent, O'Brien returned to North America in the off-season, re-joining former club, the Toronto Marlies of the AHL, on a one-year contract on September 2, 2021.

After spells with HC Slovan Bratislava and Newfoundland Growlers, O'Brien signed terms with the Cardiff Devils ahead of the 2024–25 season.

O'Brien Played the 2025-26 Season with Storhamar Hockey in the EliteHockey Ligaen. After one season in Norway he moved back to the United Kingdom and signed with the Nottingham Panthers.

== Career statistics ==
			Regular season					Playoffs
Season	Team	League	GP	G	A	Pts	PIM	GP	G	A	Pts	PIM
2009–10	Rouyn-Noranda Huskies	QMJHL	2	1	0	1	0	—	—	—	—	—
2009–10	Acadie–Bathurst Titan	QMJHL	3	0	1	1	0	—	—	—	—	—
2010–11	Acadie–Bathurst Titan	QMJHL	58	29	36	65	0	4	0	3	3	0
2011–12	Acadie–Bathurst Titan	QMJHL	63	50	51	101	0	6	1	7	8	0
2011–12	St. John's IceCaps	AHL	1	0	0	0	0	—	—	—	—	—
2012–13	Acadie–Bathurst Titan	QMJHL	66	47	45	92	2	5	4	2	6	0
2013–14	Ontario Reign	ECHL	5	2	2	4	0	—	—	—	—	—
2013–14	Manchester Monarchs	AHL	49	10	19	29	4	4	2	0	2	0
2014–15	Manchester Monarchs	AHL	62	14	18	32	4	19	3	6	9	0
2015–16	Chicago Wolves	AHL	62	8	11	19	0	—	—	—	—	—
2016–17	Ravensburg Towerstars	DEL2	20	6	6	12	4	—	—	—	—	—
2016–17	Wichita Thunder	ECHL	32	9	18	27	4	—	—	—	—	—
2016–17	Binghamton Senators	AHL	1	0	1	1	0	—	—	—	—	—
2017–18	Bakersfield Condors	AHL	43	6	17	23	2	—	—	—	—	—
2017–18	Wichita Thunder	ECHL	12	5	7	12	0	—	—	—	—	—
2018–19	Newfoundland Growlers	ECHL	53	28	40	68	6	23	16	13	29	8
2018–19	Toronto Marlies	AHL	3	0	0	0	0	—	—	—	—	—
2019–20	Newfoundland Growlers	ECHL	41	25	21	46	8	—	—	—	—	—
2019–20	Toronto Marlies	AHL	5	1	1	2	0	—	—	—	—	—
2020–21	EV Landshut	DEL2	49	40	43	83	6	—	—	—	—	—
2021–22	Newfoundland Growlers	ECHL	53	28	50	78	4	13	4	14	18	0
2021–22	Toronto Marlies	AHL	5	0	1	1	0	—	—	—	—	—
2022–23	Newfoundland Growlers	ECHL	59	23	64	87	8	11	4	9	13	0
2022–23	Toronto Marlies	AHL	7	2	4	6	0	—	—	—	—	—
2023–24	HC Slovan Bratislava	Slovak	16	5	7	12	4	—	—	—	—	—
2023–24	Newfoundland Growlers	ECHL	54	21	39	60	2	—	—	—	—	—
2024–25	Cardiff Devils	EIHL	46	17	33	50	2	4	2	1	3	0
2025–26	Storhamar Hockey	EHL	24	7	18	25	4	15	3	9	12	0
AHL totals			238	42	71	113	12	23	5	6	11	0

== Awards and honours ==
Award	Year
QMJHL
All-Rookie Team	2011
Second All-Star Team	2012
Frank J. Selke Memorial Trophy	2012, 2013
AHL
Calder Cup (Manchester Monarchs)	2015
ECHL
All-ECHL Second Team	2019
Kelly Cup (Newfoundland Growlers)	2019
June M. Kelly Award (Kelly Cup MVP)	2019
