= Manchester Monarchs =

Manchester Monarchs may refer to:

- Manchester Monarchs (AHL) (2001–2015)
- Manchester Monarchs (ECHL) (2015–2019)
