= Michael Garteig =

Canadian ice hockey player

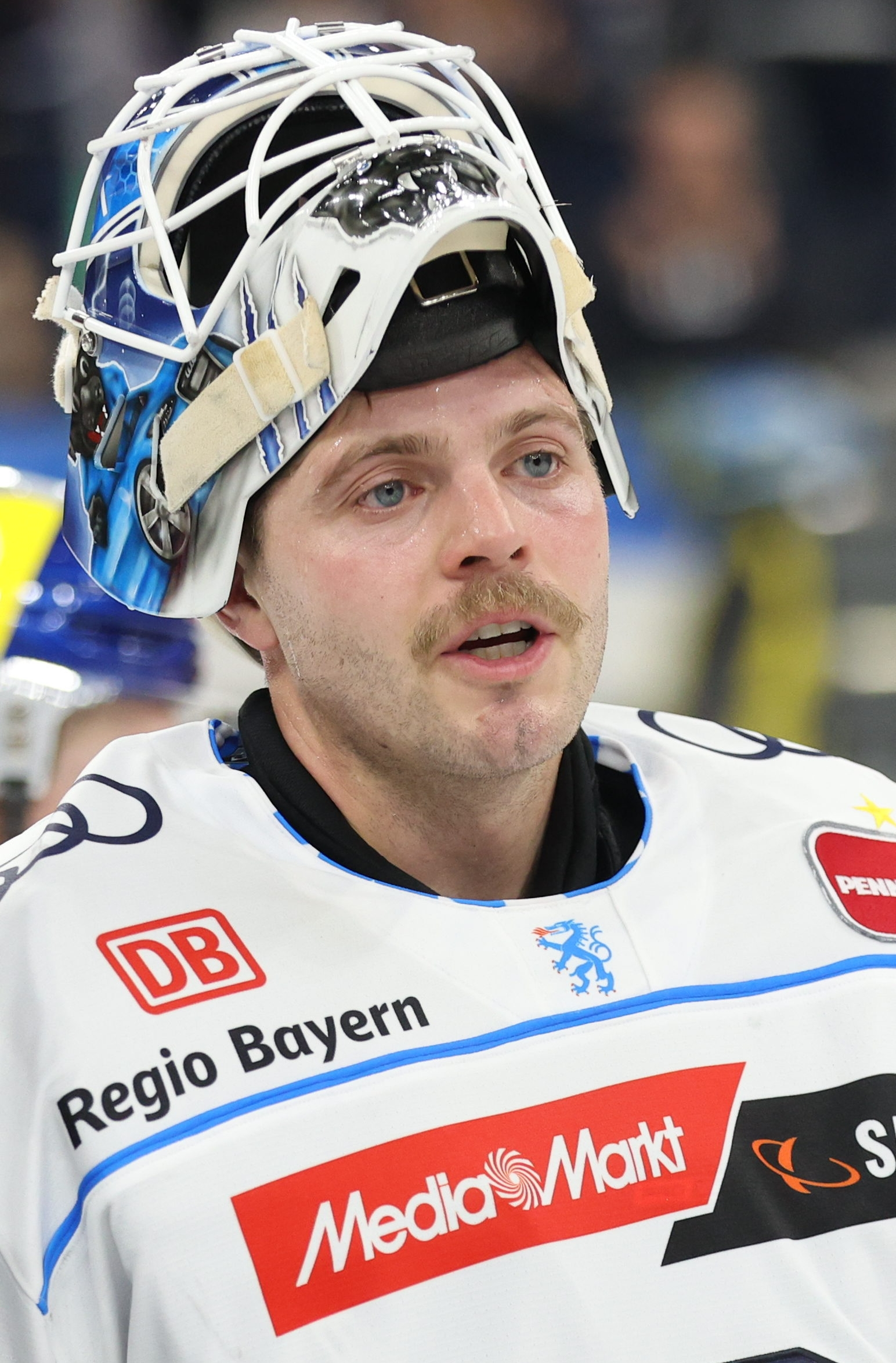
- Garteig with ERC Ingolstadt in 2024
- Born: November 5, 1991 (age 34) Prince George, British Columbia, Canada
- Height: 6 ft 1 in (185 cm)
- Weight: 190 lb (86 kg; 13 st 8 lb)
- Position: Goaltender
- Caught: Left
- Played for: Utica Comets; Toronto Marlies; Tappara; ERC Ingolstadt; HIFK; Augsburger Panther
- NHL draft: Undrafted
- Playing career: 2016–2026

Michael Garteig (born November 5, 1991) is a Canadian former professional ice hockey goaltender. Garteig has previously played for Utica Comets and Toronto Marlies of the American Hockey League (AHL).

== Playing career ==
Garteig played for the Powell River Kings and the Penticton Vees in the British Columbia Hockey League for four seasons. He won the BCHL Top Goaltender Awards in 2011 and 2012, and was a member of the 2012 Royal Bank Cup-winning Penticton Vees team.

Garteig then played collegiate hockey for the Quinnipiac Bobcats. He burst onto the scene after his freshman year. It culminated in leading the Bobcats to the ECAC championship and the NCAA finals during his fourth season, in which Quinnipiac was defeated by the University of North Dakota. He turned in his finest collegiate season that year, posting a 32–4–7 record, .924 save percentage and 1.91 goals against average. During his four seasons with Quinnipiac, he amassed a record of 78–25–16 with a 1.98 goals against average and a .917 save percentage.

After his fourth year at Quinnipiac University, Garteig signed a one-year entry-level contract with the Vancouver Canucks, and was earmarked for the Canucks' American Hockey League affiliate, the Utica Comets, for the 2016–17 season. After participating as a prospect at the Vancouver Canucks' 2016 Development camp, Garteig joined Utica on September 29, 2016. but was reassigned to the Alaska Aces of the ECHL. On November 17, 2016, he was called up by the Canucks from the Aces, but on November 19, 2016, Canucks Media announced that he would return to the Aces.

As a free agent from the Canucks, Garteig opted to remain within the organization by signing a one-year AHL contract to continue with the Utica Comets on August 24, 2017.

Following his third North American professional season, primarily playing in the ECHL and claiming the Kelly Cup with the Newfoundland Growlers, Garteig embarked on a European career by signing with top flight Finnish club, Tappara of the Liiga on June 19, 2019. In the following 2019–20 season, as Tappara's starting goaltender, Garteig collected 15 wins through 39 regular season games. Helping the club finish the regular season in third place in the standings the playoffs were then cancelled due to the COVID-19 pandemic.

Leaving Tappara at the conclusion of his contract, Garteig remained in Europe to sign a one-year contract for the 2020–21 season with German club, ERC Ingolstadt of the DEL, on September 8, 2020.

After completing his fourth season with ERC Ingolstadt, Garteig left the club and was signed to a one-year contract with fellow German outfit, Augsburger Panther, for the 2025–26 season on April 27, 2024.

== Career statistics ==
			Regular season									Playoffs
Season	Team	League	GP	W	L	T/OT	MIN	GA	SO	GAA	SV%	GP	W	L	MIN	GA	SO	GAA	SV%
2009–10	Powell River Kings	BCHL	26	15	11	0	1564	76	1	2.92	.893	—	—	—	—	—	—	—	—
2010–11	Powell River Kings	BCHL	48	36	8	3	2805	79	7	1.69	.934	—	—	—	—	—	—	—	—
2011–12	Penticton Vees	BCHL	45	41	4	0	2578	83	5	1.93	.927	—	—	—	—	—	—	—	—
2012–13	Quinnipiac University	ECAC	5	0	1	0	118	4	0	2.03	.895	—	—	—	—	—	—	—	—
2013–14	Quinnipiac University	ECAC	40	24	10	6	2409	78	6	1.94	.910	—	—	—	—	—	—	—	—
2014–15	Quinnipiac University	ECAC	36	22	10	3	2153	73	5	2.03	.917	—	—	—	—	—	—	—	—
2015–16	Quinnipiac University	ECAC	43	32	4	7	2581	82	8	1.91	.924	—	—	—	—	—	—	—	—
2016–17	Alaska Aces	ECHL	22	11	6	3	1176	61	1	3.11	.906	—	—	—	—	—	—	—	—
2016–17	Utica Comets	AHL	8	0	4	2	419	21	0	3.01	.897	—	—	—	—	—	—	—	—
2017–18	Kalamazoo Wings	ECHL	24	12	10	2	1403	89	0	3.81	.887	—	—	—	—	—	—	—	—
2018–19	Newfoundland Growlers	ECHL	43	23	14	6	2534	115	3	2.72	.909	23	16	7	1423	52	3	2.19	.928
2018–19	Toronto Marlies	AHL	2	1	1	0	119	5	0	2.52	.917	—	—	—	—	—	—	—	—
2019–20	Tappara	Liiga	34	15	9	9	1968	66	3	2.01	.929	—	—	—	—	—	—	—	—
2020–21	ERC Ingolstadt	DEL	29	16	12	0	1726	75	1	2.61	.902	5	3	2	299	18	0	3.01	.917
2021–22	HIFK	Liiga	36	10	15	9	2070	75	1	2.17	.903	—	—	—	—	—	—	—	—
2022–23	ERC Ingolstadt	DEL	42	25	15	0	2377	88	2	2.22	.914	5	3	1	318	14	0	2.64	.892
2023–24	ERC Ingolstadt	DEL	49	24	25	0	2899	107	5	2.21	.914	7	2	4	361	24	0	3.98	.879
2024–25	ERC Ingolstadt	DEL	19	12	6	0	1111	49	1	2.65	.892	—	—	—	—	—	—	—	—
Liiga totals			70	25	24	18	4038	141	4	2.10	.917	—	—	—	—	—	—	—	—

== Awards and honours ==
Award	Year
BCHL
Coastal First All-Star Team	2011
Wally Forslund Memorial Trophy	2011
Top Goaltender	2011, 2012
Interior First All-Star Team	2012
College
ECAC Third All-Star Team	2015, 2016
ECAC All-Tournament Team	2016
ECHL
Kelly Cup (Newfoundland Growlers)	2019
