= Charles Williams (ice hockey) =

American ice hockey player (born 1992)

- Born: March 12, 1992 (age 33) Canton, Michigan, U.S.
- Height: 5 ft 10 in (178 cm)
- Weight: 193 lb (88 kg; 13 st 11 lb)
- Position: Goaltender
- Shot: Left
- Played for: Hartford Wolf Pack; Ontario Reign; Rochester Americans; Manchester Monarchs
- NHL draft: Undrafted
- Playing career: 2016–2023

Charles Williams (born March 12, 1992) is an American former professional ice hockey player. He played in the American Hockey League (AHL) and ECHL.

== Early life ==
Williams was born in Canton, Michigan. He played college hockey at Ferris State University and Canisius College. In 2017, while playing for Canisius, Williams was named a First Team All-American, and was a selected as a finalist for the Hobey Baker Award.

== Playing career ==
On July 17, 2019, Williams continued his career in the ECHL, securing a one-year contract with the Indy Fuel.

As a free agent leading into the pandemic delayed 2020–21 season, Williams was signed by the Jacksonville Icemen of the ECHL. Before making an appearance with the club, Williams was signed to a professional tryout contract to attend the Hershey Bears training camp on January 22, 2021. He remained on the Bears roster to begin the season before he was released and returned to the Icemen on February 8, 2021.

Following completion of his third season with the Jacksonville Icemen, Williams announced his retirement on June 27, 2023.
