= Adirondack Thunder =

Minor league ice hockey team in New York, US

- City: Glens Falls, New York
- League: ECHL
- Conference: Eastern
- Division: North
- Founded: 1990
- Home arena: Harding Mazzotti Arena
- Colors: Red, black, white, gray
- Owner: Adirondack Civic Center Coalition
- General manager: Tadd Sipowicz (Interim)
- Head coach: Sylvain Cloutier
- Media: The Post-Star; WCQL
- Affiliates: New Jersey Devils (NHL); Utica Comets (AHL)
- Website: echlthunder.com

Franchise history
- 1990–1992: Cincinnati Cyclones
- 1992–2001: Birmingham Bulls
- 2001–2005: Atlantic City Boardwalk Bullies
- 2005–2015: Stockton Thunder
- 2015–present: Adirondack Thunder

Championships
- Division titles: 3 (2016–17, 2017–18, 2023–24)

The Adirondack Thunder are a professional ice hockey team in the ECHL that began play in the 2015–16 season. The team is based in Glens Falls, New York, and affiliated with the New Jersey Devils of the National Hockey League (NHL) and the Utica Comets of the American Hockey League. The Thunder play their home games at the Harding Mazzotti Arena.

The Thunder replaced the AHL's Adirondack Flames after they were relocated to Stockton, California, to become the Stockton Heat.

== History ==
On January 29, 2015, the Calgary Flames announced that they would be moving their AHL affiliate, the Adirondack Flames, to Stockton as one of five charter members of the AHL's new Pacific Division. The next day, the Flames announced that the ECHL's Stockton Thunder (who they had purchased the day before) would move to Glens Falls in what was essentially a "market swap".

The Thunder name, logo and colors were unveiled on February 11, 2015. Cail MacLean was announced the team's first head coach on July 23, 2015.

The Thunder made the playoffs during their first season and were the first Adirondack hockey team to make the playoffs in ten years. They defeated the favored Manchester Monarchs four-games-to-one in the first round, becoming the first team in Glens Falls to win a playoff series since the Adirondack Red Wings in 1994. They faced the South Carolina Stingrays in the second round, which they lost in seven games.

During their second season, the league announced the sale of the Thunder from Calgary Sports and Entertainment to a local ownership group called Adirondack Civic Center Coalition on February 28, 2017. The Thunder were the third of the three displaced franchises from the 2015 creation of the AHL Pacific Division to be sold by their NHL owners after relocating. However, in order for the new ownership group to complete the purchase of the team, they needed to raise $500,000 by a June 30, 2017, deadline. The new ownership group completed the purchase on time but were in debt, and sold the naming rights of the Glens Falls Civic Center to become the Cool Insuring Arena to cover some of the operating costs.

The Flames and Thunder ended their affiliation following the 2016–17 season. Head coach MacLean also left to join the Flames' AHL affiliate in Stockton as an assistant coach. The Thunder then become the ECHL affiliate of the New Jersey Devils for the 2017–18 season, and later extended the affiliation agreement for the 2018–19 season. For the Thunder's first two seasons, the Devils' organization sent players to Glens Falls due to the proximity of their previous AHL affiliate, the Albany Devils. The Thunder also hired Brad Tapper as its next head coach.

Under Tapper, the Thunder finished the 2017–18 season first in their division and advanced to the conference finals before losing to the Florida Everblades four games to one. Tapper was then hired by the Grand Rapids Griffins of the AHL as an assistant coach and was replaced by Alex Loh as head coach for the 2018–19 ECHL season.

Due to the COVID-19 pandemic, the Thunder voluntarily suspended operations for the 2020–21 ECHL season.

On May 11, 2022, the Thunder fired head coach and Director of Hockey Operations Alex Loh, after finishing the 2021–22 season with a record of 27–40–4–0, a league worst .408 winning percentage and missing the playoffs for the first time since the team relocated to Glens Falls.

Subsequently, the organization would announce on June 21, 2022, that Pete MacArthur would be named the 4th head coach in team history.

The Thunder returned to the Kelly Cup playoffs in MacArthur's first season. In the final weekend of the season, Adirondack caught the Worcester Railers after spending the entire season behind them in the standings. They won their first playoff game in five years to open their first-round series against the Newfoundland Growlers, but bowed out in five games.

The Thunder set a team record with twelve straight wins during the 2023-24 season, finishing with their best record in team history, going 43-18-7-4, earning 97 points, and winning the North Division for the first time since 2018. They also won their first and second round series on home ice, a first for the team, and the first time an Adirondack hockey team clinched a series at home since 1992.

== Rivals ==
The Manchester Monarchs were the Thunder's main rival. Following both franchises relocating from California, the two teams met for four straight seasons in the Kelly Cup playoffs. The teams each won two series, alternating years, before the Monarchs ceased operations in 2019.

== Season-by-season records ==
Regular season										Playoffs				
Season	GP	W	L	OTL	SOL	Pts	GF	GA	Standing	Year	1st round	2nd round	3rd round	Kelly Cup
2015–16	72	38	28	2	4	82	197	189	2nd, East Div.	2016	W, 4–1, MAN	L, 3–4, SC	—	—
2016–17	72	41	20	7	4	93	266	218	1st, North Div.	2017	L, 2–4, MAN	—	—	—
2017–18	72	41	24	3	4	89	233	221	1st, North Div.	2018	W, 4–2, WOR	W, 4–2, MAN	L, 1–4, FLA	—
2018–19	72	37	26	6	3	83	234	220	2nd, North Div.	2019	L, 1–4, MAN	—	—	—
2019–20	62	22	28	8	5	57	197	219	5th, North Div.	2020	Remainder of Regular Season and Playoffs cancelled			
2020–21	Opted out of participating due to the COVID-19 pandemic									2021	Did not participate			
2021–22	71	27	40	4	0	58	202	272	6th, North Div.	2022	Did not qualify			
2022–23	72	32	29	9	2	75	237	243	4th, North Div.	2023	L, 1–4, NFL	—	—	—
2023–24	72	43	18	7	4	97	241	212	1st, North Div.	2024	W, 4–3, MNE	W, 4–2, NOR	L, 2–4, FLA	—
2024–25	72	26	41	3	2	57	190	246	7th, North Div.	2025	Did not qualify			
2025–26	72	37	24	10	1	85	213	216	3rd, North Div.	2026	L, 3–4, MNE	—	—	—

== Players and personnel ==
=== Team captains ===
- Rob Bordson, 2015
- Pete MacArthur, 2016–2017, 2021–2022
- Mike Bergin, 2017–2018
- James Henry, 2018–2020
- Shane Harper, 2022–2023
- Patrick Grasso, 2023-2024
- Darian Skeoch, 2024–2025
- Ryan Wheeler, 2025–2026

=== Head coaches ===
- Cail MacLean, 2015–2017
- Brad Tapper, 2017–2018
- Alex Loh, 2018–2022
- Pete MacArthur, 2022–2025
- Sylvain Cloutier, 2025–Present
