= Pat Nagle =

American ice hockey player (born 1987)

- Born: September 21, 1987 (age 38) Bloomfield, Michigan, U.S.
- Height: 6 ft 3 in (191 cm)
- Weight: 185 lb (84 kg; 13 st 3 lb)
- Position: Goaltender
- Caught: Left
- Played for: Syracuse Crunch; Rochester Americans; Grand Rapids Griffins; Utica Comets; Lehigh Valley Phantoms
- National team: United States
- NHL draft: Undrafted
- Playing career: 2011–2023

Patrick Nagle (born September 21, 1987) is an American former professional ice hockey goaltender.

== Playing career ==
On March 22, 2011, the Tampa Bay Lightning signed the undrafted free agent to a two-year entry-level contract. He played NCAA hockey at Ferris State University prior to turning professional.

In his first professional season in 2011–12, with the Florida Everblades, Nagle shared primary goaltending duties with John Muse, playing 39 games. During the playoffs, Nagle recorded the best goals against average and tied for first in save percentage, at 1.42 and .941, respectively. After winning the Kelly Cup, Nagle was called up to the AHL for the Lightning organization's affiliate, the Norfolk Admirals, during their Calder Cup championship series against the Toronto Marlies.

On August 27, 2013, Nagle agreed as a free agent to a one-year AHL contract with the Texas Stars, the affiliate of the Dallas Stars. After training camp with the Stars, Nagle did not make the club and was assigned to their ECHL affiliate, the Idaho Steelheads for the duration of the 2013-14 season, winning a career-high 23 of 43 games.

On July 21, 2014, Nagle opted to remain in the ECHL, signing a one-year deal with the Fort Wayne Komets. On January 12, 2015, the Grand Rapids Griffins signed Nagle to a professional try out. Before signing a professional tryout with the Griffins, he recorded a 17–4–1 record, a 2.42 GGA, and a .910 save percentage in 22 games with the Fort Wayne Komets this season. On February 5, 2015, Nagle was released from his professional tryout, and returned to the Fort Wayne Komets. Nagle made his first start for the Griffins on January 23, in a game against the Utica Comets, earning his first career AHL win. In three AHL games this season, Nagle recorded a 1–1–0 record, 1.76 goals against average, and a 0.948 save percentage. During the 2014–15 season, Nagle posted a 23–7–2 record, 2.48 GAA and a .907 save percentage with the Fort Wayne Komets. He also made two appearances with the Rochester Americans and one with the Utica Comets.

On July 22, 2015, the Fort Wayne Komets re-signed Nagle. On December 9, 2015; the Grand Rapids Griffins signed Nagle to a professional try out. Before signing a professional tryout with the Griffins, he recorded a 5–4–0 record, with a 2.51 GAA and a .910 save percentage in 10 games with the Fort Wayne Komets this season.

Nagle played two further seasons with the Komets before signing a one-year AHL contract to return to the Grand Rapids Griffins on July 27, 2017. Nagle was named the Warrior Hockey/ECHL Goaltender of the Month for November 2017. He recorded a 7–1–1 record, with a 2.66 GAA and a .907 save percentage in nine games during the month. He was also named ECHL Goaltender of the Week for the week ending November 6 after going 3–0–0 with a 2.03 GAA and a .933 save percentage in three appearances.

After three seasons in the Griffins organization, Nagle continued his career in the AHL as a free agent, agreeing to a one-year deal with the Lehigh Valley Phantoms, affiliate to the Philadelphia Flyers, on September 17, 2021.

== International play ==
In January 2022, he was named to the United States men's national ice hockey team for the 2022 Winter Olympics. He served as the team's third choice goaltender and did not feature in the tournament.

== Career statistics ==
			Regular season									Playoffs
Season	Team	League	GP	W	L	T/OT	MIN	GA	SO	GAA	SV%	GP	W	L	MIN	GA	SO	GAA	SV%
2006–07	St. Louis Bandits	NAHL	36	24	8	4	2136	81	1	2.28	.920	—	—	—	—	—	—	—	—
2007–08	Ferris State	CCHA	16	8	7	0	867	38	1	2.63	.900	—	—	—	—	—	—	—	—
2008–09	Ferris State	CCHA	22	7	11	3	1246	59	0	2.84	.909	—	—	—	—	—	—	—	—
2009–10	Ferris State	CCHA	26	12	10	3	1496	53	1	2.13	.923	—	—	—	—	—	—	—	—
2010–11	Ferris State	CCHA	37	18	14	5	2192	74	3	2.02	.923	—	—	—	—	—	—	—	—
2011–12	Florida Everblades	ECHL	39	20	14	3	2234	107	1	2.87	.905	6	4	1	338	8	2	1.42	.941
2012–13	Florida Everblades	ECHL	31	14	9	3	1688	85	0	3.02	.904	—	—	—	—	—	—	—	—
2012–13	Syracuse Crunch	AHL	2	0	1	0	97	6	0	3.70	.875	—	—	—	—	—	—	—	—
2013–14	Idaho Steelheads	ECHL	43	23	14	4	2530	115	1	2.73	.918	3	1	1	159	9	0	3.40	.906
2014–15	Fort Wayne Komets	ECHL	33	23	7	2	1938	80	1	2.48	.907	5	3	2	334	12	0	2.15	.913
2014–15	Rochester Americans	AHL	2	0	2	0	119	9	0	4.53	.886	—	—	—	—	—	—	—	—
2014–15	Grand Rapids Griffins	AHL	2	1	0	0	77	1	0	0.78	.971	—	—	—	—	—	—	—	—
2014–15	Utica Comets	AHL	1	0	1	0	59	3	0	3.07	.893	—	—	—	—	—	—	—	—
2015–16	Fort Wayne Komets	ECHL	51	28	12	8	2969	117	5	2.36	.915	16	9	6	986	39	2	2.37	.906
2016–17	Fort Wayne Komets	ECHL	25	15	3	4	1267	47	2	2.23	.916	9	5	2	557	24	0	2.58	.906
2017–18	Toledo Walleye	ECHL	50	37	6	3	2907	108	3	2.23	.924	10	6	4	656	28	0	2.56	.919
2018–19	Toledo Walleye	ECHL	41	22	14	2	2411	113	3	2.81	.910	24	14	10	1481	50	1	2.03	.931
2018–19	Grand Rapids Griffins	AHL	1	0	0	1	62	5	0	4.81	.800	—	—	—	—	—	—	—	—
2019–20	Toledo Walleye	ECHL	15	9	4	2	910	42	0	2.77	.910	—	—	—	—	—	—	—	—
2019–20	Grand Rapids Griffins	AHL	20	9	8	1	1136	44	0	2.32	.920	—	—	—	—	—	—	—	—
2020–21	Grand Rapids Griffins	AHL	12	6	6	0	669	31	0	2.78	.892	—	—	—	—	—	—	—	—
2021–22	Reading Royals	ECHL	17	11	3	3	1021	41	1	2.41	.925	7	3	4	413	20	0	2.90	.908
2021–22	Lehigh Valley Phantoms	AHL	22	10	6	6	1247	57	2	2.74	.904	—	—	—	—	—	—	—	—
2022–23	Reading Royals	ECHL	28	21	7	0	1632	71	1	2.61	.908	10	5	5	586	33	0	3.38	.890
2022–23	Lehigh Valley Phantoms	AHL	9	1	7	1	535	34	0	3.81	.877	—	—	—	—	—	—	—	—
AHL totals			71	27	31	9	4,001	190	2	2.85	.901	—	—	—	—	—	—	—	—

== Awards and honours ==
Award	Year
NAHL
All-Rookie Team	2007
Rookie of the Year	2007
Second All-Star Team	2007
College
All-CCHA First Team	2011
AHCA West First-Team All-American	2011
ECHL
All-ECHL Second Team	2018
