= 2022–23 ECHL season =

Ice hockey league season

- League: ECHL
- Sport: Ice hockey
- Duration: October 21, 2022 – April 16, 2023

Regular season
- Brabham Cup: Idaho Steelheads
- Season MVP: Hank Crone (Allen)
- Top scorer: Hank Crone (Allen)

Playoffs
- Playoffs MVP: Cam Johnson (Florida)

Kelly Cup
- Champions: Florida Everblades
- Runners-up: Idaho Steelheads

ECHL seasons
- 2021–22 2023–24

The 2022–23 ECHL season was the 35th season of the ECHL. The regular season began on October 21, 2022, and ended on April 16, 2023, with the 2023 Kelly Cup playoffs to follow. 28 teams in 20 states and two Canadian provinces played 72 games.

== Team changes ==
- The league added a new expansion team, the Savannah Ghost Pirates in Savannah, Georgia. With the addition of Savannah to the South Division and the move of the Norfolk Admirals from the South Division to the North Division, it made all the divisions equal at 7 teams each for the first time since the 2014-15 ECHL season, not counting the 2020-21 ECHL season, where only 14 teams played in two seven-team divisions.

== Affiliation changes ==
| ECHL team | New affiliates | Former affiliates |
|---|---|---|
| Allen Americans | Ottawa Senators (NHL); Belleville Senators (AHL) | Seattle Kraken (NHL); Charlotte Checkers (AHL) |
| Atlanta Gladiators | Arizona Coyotes (NHL); Tucson Roadrunners (AHL) | Ottawa Senators (NHL); Belleville Senators (AHL) |
| Florida Everblades | Florida Panthers (NHL); Charlotte Checkers (AHL) | Nashville Predators (NHL); Milwaukee Admirals (AHL) |
| Fort Wayne Komets | Edmonton Oilers (NHL); Bakersfield Condors (AHL) | Vegas Golden Knights (NHL); Henderson Silver Knights (AHL) |
| Greenville Swamp Rabbits | Los Angeles Kings (NHL); Ontario Reign (AHL) | Florida Panthers (NHL); Charlotte Checkers (AHL) |
| Kansas City Mavericks | Seattle Kraken (NHL); Coachella Valley Firebirds (AHL) | Calgary Flames (NHL); Stockton Heat (AHL) |
| Rapid City Rush | Calgary Flames (NHL); Calgary Wranglers (AHL) | Arizona Coyotes (NHL); Tucson Roadrunners (AHL) |
| Savannah Ghost Pirates | Vegas Golden Knights (NHL); Henderson Silver Knights (AHL) | Expansion team |
| Wichita Thunder | San Jose Sharks (NHL); San Jose Barracuda (AHL) | Edmonton Oilers (NHL); Bakersfield Condors (AHL) |

== Annual Board of Governors meeting ==
Beginning the 2022–23 ECHL season, The Board of Governors approved utilizing a two-referee system for 25 percent of all League regular-season games during the 2022–23 Season. Each team will play nine home games where the two-referee system is used.

== All-star game ==
The 2023 All Star Game was held on January 16, 2023, in Norfolk Scope Arena, home arena of the Norfolk Admirals.

== Standings ==
Updated through games of April 16, 2023

=== Eastern Conference ===
| North Division | GP | W | L | OTL | SOL | GF | GA | Pts | Pts% |
|---|---|---|---|---|---|---|---|---|---|
| y – Newfoundland Growlers (TOR) | 72 | 48 | 22 | 2 | 0 | 271 | 217 | 98 | 0.681 |
| x – Reading Royals (PHI) | 72 | 41 | 25 | 5 | 1 | 262 | 215 | 88 | 0.611 |
| x – Maine Mariners (BOS) | 72 | 42 | 27 | 2 | 1 | 267 | 210 | 87 | 0.604 |
| x – Adirondack Thunder (NJD) | 72 | 32 | 29 | 9 | 2 | 237 | 243 | 75 | 0.521 |
| Worcester Railers (NYI) | 72 | 34 | 34 | 4 | 0 | 227 | 242 | 72 | 0.500 |
| Trois-Rivières Lions (MTL) | 72 | 29 | 40 | 3 | 0 | 216 | 273 | 61 | 0.424 |
| Norfolk Admirals (CAR) | 72 | 21 | 46 | 2 | 3 | 203 | 318 | 47 | 0.326 |

| South Division | GP | W | L | OTL | SOL | GF | GA | Pts | Pts% |
|---|---|---|---|---|---|---|---|---|---|
| y – South Carolina Stingrays (WAS) | 72 | 45 | 22 | 4 | 1 | 263 | 194 | 95 | 0.660 |
| x – Jacksonville Icemen (NYR) | 72 | 44 | 24 | 3 | 1 | 235 | 209 | 93 | 0.646 |
| x – Greenville Swamp Rabbits (LAK) | 72 | 40 | 23 | 8 | 1 | 244 | 211 | 89 | 0.618 |
| x – Florida Everblades (FLA) | 72 | 38 | 25 | 4 | 5 | 225 | 213 | 85 | 0.590 |
| Atlanta Gladiators (ARI) | 72 | 35 | 30 | 6 | 1 | 226 | 240 | 77 | 0.535 |
| Orlando Solar Bears (TBL) | 72 | 30 | 33 | 8 | 1 | 221 | 264 | 69 | 0.479 |
| Savannah Ghost Pirates (VGK) | 72 | 28 | 34 | 9 | 1 | 207 | 258 | 66 | 0.458 |

=== Western Conference ===
| Central Division | GP | W | L | OTL | SOL | GF | GA | Pts | Pts% |
|---|---|---|---|---|---|---|---|---|---|
| y – Cincinnati Cyclones (BUF) | 72 | 47 | 16 | 6 | 3 | 266 | 216 | 103 | 0.715 |
| x – Toledo Walleye (DET) | 72 | 45 | 19 | 5 | 3 | 254 | 182 | 98 | 0.681 |
| x – Indy Fuel (CHI) | 72 | 43 | 24 | 5 | 0 | 244 | 208 | 91 | 0.632 |
| x – Fort Wayne Komets (EDM) | 72 | 34 | 31 | 4 | 3 | 270 | 275 | 75 | 0.521 |
| Kalamazoo Wings (CBJ) | 72 | 29 | 37 | 5 | 1 | 178 | 226 | 64 | 0.444 |
| Wheeling Nailers (PIT) | 72 | 29 | 38 | 5 | 0 | 223 | 244 | 63 | 0.438 |
| Iowa Heartlanders (MIN) | 72 | 22 | 36 | 13 | 1 | 189 | 256 | 58 | 0.403 |

| Mountain Division | GP | W | L | OTL | SOL | GF | GA | Pts | Pts% |
|---|---|---|---|---|---|---|---|---|---|
| z – Idaho Steelheads (DAL) | 72 | 58 | 11 | 1 | 2 | 290 | 153 | 119 | 0.826 |
| x – Allen Americans (OTT) | 72 | 37 | 32 | 2 | 1 | 260 | 263 | 77 | 0.535 |
| x – Kansas City Mavericks (SEA) | 72 | 34 | 30 | 6 | 2 | 222 | 224 | 76 | 0.528 |
| x – Utah Grizzlies (COL) | 72 | 35 | 33 | 4 | 0 | 225 | 259 | 74 | 0.514 |
| Wichita Thunder (SJS) | 72 | 33 | 32 | 6 | 1 | 227 | 238 | 73 | 0.507 |
| Rapid City Rush (CGY) | 72 | 33 | 34 | 5 | 0 | 242 | 272 | 71 | 0.493 |
| Tulsa Oilers (ANA) | 72 | 22 | 41 | 8 | 1 | 203 | 279 | 53 | 0.368 |

x – clinched playoff spot, y – clinched regular season division title, z – Brabham Cup (regular season) champion

== Postseason ==
=== Playoffs format ===
At the end of the regular season, the top four teams in each division qualify for the 2023 Kelly Cup playoffs and are seeded one through four based on the highest points total earned in the season. Then the first two rounds of the playoffs are held within the division with the first seed facing the fourth seed and the second seed facing the third seed. The division champions then play each other in a conference championship. The Kelly Cup finals pit the Eastern Conference champion against the Western Conference champion. All four rounds are a best-of-seven format.

=== Bracket ===
Division Semifinals | Division Finals
N1 | Newfoundland | 4
N4 | Adirondack | 1
N1 | Newfoundland | 4
North Division
N2 | Reading | 1
N2 | Reading | 4
N3 | Maine | 2
Eastern Conference
S1 | South Carolina | 2
S4 | Florida | 4
S4 | Florida | 4
South Division
S2 | Jacksonville | 2
S2 | Jacksonville | 4
S3 | Greenville | 2
C1 | Cincinnati | 4
C4 | Fort Wayne | 3
C1 | Cincinnati | 0
Central Division
C2 | Toledo | 4
C2 | Toledo | 4
C3 | Indy | 0
Western Conference
M1 | Idaho | 4
M4 | Utah | 2
M1 | Idaho | 4
Mountain Division
M2 | Allen | 1
M2 | Allen | 4
M3 | Kansas City | 2

Conference Finals
N1 | Newfoundland | 2
S4 | Florida | 4
C2 | Toledo | 1
M1 | Idaho | 4

Kelly Cup Finals
S4 | Florida | 4
M1 | Idaho | 0

== See also ==
- List of ECHL seasons
- 2022 in sports
- 2023 in sports
