= Manchester Monarchs (ECHL) =

Defunct professional ice hockey team

- City: Manchester, New Hampshire
- League: ECHL
- Conference: Eastern
- Division: North
- Founded: 1993
- Folded: 2019
- Home arena: SNHU Arena
- Colors
- Owners: PPI Sports, LLC
- General manager: Doug Christiansen
- Head coach: Doug Christiansen
- Affiliates: Los Angeles Kings (NHL); Ontario Reign (AHL)

Franchise history
- 1993–2000: Huntington Blizzard
- 2003–2008: Texas Wildcatters
- 2008–2015: Ontario Reign
- 2015–2019: Manchester Monarchs

Championships
- Division titles: 1 (2015–16)

The Manchester Monarchs were a professional ice hockey team in the ECHL which began play in the 2015–16 season. Based in Manchester, New Hampshire, and affiliated with the National Hockey League's Los Angeles Kings, the team played its home games at the SNHU Arena.

The Monarchs replaced the American Hockey League team of the same name, which played from 2001 until 2015, after which they moved to Ontario, California, and became the Ontario Reign.

After four seasons in the ECHL, and a sharp drop in attendance from their AHL days, the Monarchs ceased operations when the organization failed to find new ownership.

== History ==
On January 29, 2015, the Los Angeles Kings announced that they would be moving their AHL affiliate, the Manchester Monarchs, to Ontario, California, as one of five charter members of the AHL's new Pacific Division. The next day, they announced that their ECHL affiliate, the current Ontario Reign, would move to Manchester and take on the Monarchs name in what is essentially a "franchise swap".

Prior to their second season, the Anschutz Entertainment Group (AEG) sold the Monarchs to PPI Sports, LLC on August 2, 2016. AEG also owns the AHL Ontario Reign and a stake in the Los Angeles Kings. Kings president Luc Robitaille stated that the Monarchs would continue to be affiliated with the Kings and Reign despite the team no longer being under the same ownership as their NHL and AHL teams.

On January 18, 2019, the Monarchs were announced as seeking new owners. At the end of the 2018–19 ECHL season, the team was unable to find new ownership and ceased operations. The league then revoked the franchise license.

== Season-by-season records ==
Regular season										Playoffs				
Season	GP	W	L	OTL	SOL	Pts	GF	GA	Standing	Year	1st round	2nd round	3rd round	Kelly Cup
2015–16	72	39	24	4	5	87	222	213	1st, East Div.	2016	L, 1–4, ADK	—	—	—
2016–17	72	37	24	7	4	85	264	252	4th, North Div.	2017	W, 4–2, ADK	W, 4–2, BRM	L, 3–4, SC	—
2017–18	72	41	25	3	3	88	257	214	2nd, North Div.	2018	W, 4–0, REA	L, 2–4, ADK	—	—
2018–19	72	39	29	2	2	82	233	232	3rd, North Div.	2019	W, 4–1, ADK	L, 2–4, NFL	—	—
