= Jacksonville Icemen =

Professional ice hockey team of the ECHL based in Jacksonville, Florida

- City: Jacksonville, Florida
- League: ECHL
- Conference: Eastern
- Division: South
- Founded: 1992 (In the CoHL)
- Home arena: VyStar Veterans Memorial Arena
- Colors: Navy blue, Columbia blue, white
- Owners: SZH Hockey LLC (Andrew Kaufmann, majority)
- Head coach: Brandon Mashinter
- Affiliates: Minnesota Wild (NHL); Iowa Wild (AHL)
- Website: jacksonvilleicemen.com

Franchise history
- 1992–2008: Muskegon Fury
- 2008–2010: Muskegon Lumberjacks
- 2010–2016: Evansville IceMen
- 2017–present: Jacksonville Icemen

The Jacksonville Icemen are a minor league ice hockey team in the ECHL in Jacksonville, Florida, that began play in the 2017–18 season. The team is affiliated with the Minnesota Wild of the National Hockey League (NHL) and plays their home games at VyStar Veterans Memorial Arena.

== History ==
The Icemen were formerly known as the Muskegon Fury from 1992 to 2008, the Muskegon Lumberjacks from 2008 to 2010, and the Evansville IceMen from 2010 to 2016.

On November 16, 2015, Evansville IceMen owner Ron Geary wrote a letter to the fans that the team's operating lease with the Ford Center was ending after the 2015–16 season. Despite attempts to negotiate a lease extension with the city since February 2015, the two parties had not yet come to an agreement on new terms. The City of Evansville, Indiana and Geary were unable to come to an agreement. Geary then agreed to terms with the city of Owensboro, Kentucky, to relocate the team to the Owensboro Sportscenter if the IceMen were forced to leave the Ford Center.

On February 8, 2016, the City of Evansville announced that it had secured an expansion team in the Southern Professional Hockey League to play at the Ford Center beginning in the 2016–17 season, thus displacing the IceMen franchise from Evansville. Finally, on March 14, the IceMen and the ECHL announced the franchise's relocation to Owensboro had been approved but the franchise would have to go dormant for the 2016–17 season to allow time for the necessary renovations on the Owensboro Sportscenter to be completed. However, by September 2016, Geary still had not taken over management of the Sportscenter and the City of Owensboro announced a different management company would take over the Sportscenter on October 1. On the September 30 deadline, Geary sent a letter to mayor Ron Payne stating he would not be purchasing the Sportscenter because of too much cost to convert and refurbish the arena.

In January 2017, Geary sold part of the franchise to an ownership group based out of Jacksonville, Florida, and the relocation was approved by the ECHL on February 8, 2017. Geary remained as the primary owner. The team hired Jason Christie as their first head coach and then affiliated with the Winnipeg Jets (NHL) and the Manitoba Moose (AHL), the organization familiar with Christie from his time as the head coach of the Tulsa Oilers.

In the team's second season in Jacksonville, the franchise qualified for the ECHL playoffs for the first time since it joined the league in 2012. Following the season, Geary sold his shares of the team and the controlling interest was acquired by SZH Hockey LLC, a group led by Andrew Kaufmann on July 16, 2019. On December 1, 2020, the team added three members of SZH Hockey LLC, all past or present NFL players with a connection to the area: Tim Tebow, Myles Jack, and Reggie Hayward.

After four seasons as affiliates of the Jets, the Icemen switched their affiliation to the New York Rangers of the NHL and their AHL affiliate, the Hartford Wolf Pack, beginning with the 2021–22 season. On July 29, 2021, head coach Jason Christie was hired by the Buffalo Sabres as an assistant coach and was replaced by Nick Luukko as head coach of the Icemen.

After two seasons as an affiliate of the Rangers, the Icemen once again switched their affiliation, this time to the Buffalo Sabres of the NHL and the Rochester Americans of the AHL, beginning with the 2023-24 season.

After three seasons as an affiliate of the Sabres, the Icemen switched their affiliation once more for the 2026–27 season, this time to the Minnesota Wild of the NHL and the Iowa Wild of the AHL. For the team's 10th anniversary in Jacksonville, they unveiled new team logos featuring Yeti iconography.

== Season-by-season records ==
Regular season										Playoffs				
Season	GP	W	L	OTL	SOL	Pts	GF	GA	Standing	Year	1st round	2nd round	3rd round	Kelly Cup
2017–18	72	26	39	4	3	59	203	246	5th, South	2018	did not qualify			
2018–19	72	36	32	2	2	76	198	217	4th, South	2019	L, 2–4, FLA	—	—	—
2019–20	60	24	29	6	1	55	173	206	6th, South	2020	Season cancelled			
2020–21	71	34	30	3	4	75	205	212	6th, Eastern	2021	did not qualify			
2021–22	72	40	27	3	2	85	206	185	3rd, South	2022	W, 4–0, ATL	L, 0–4, FLA	—	—
2022–23	72	44	23	3	2	93	231	207	2nd, South	2023	W, 4–2, GRN	L, 2–4, FLA	—	—
2023–24	72	42	23	6	1	91	238	195	2nd, South	2024	L, 3–4, FLA	—	—	—
2024–25	72	42	22	7	1	92	232	190	3rd, South	2025	L, 0–4, FLA	—	—	—

== See also ==
- Sports in Jacksonville
