= Newfoundland Growlers =

Defunct professional ice hockey team

Newfoundland Growlers Growlers de Terre-Neuve
- City: St. John's, NL
- League: ECHL
- Conference: Eastern
- Division: North
- Founded: 2018
- Folded: 2024
- Colours: Gold, black
- Parent clubs: Toronto Maple Leafs (NHL); Toronto Marlies (AHL)
- Website: nlgrowlers.com

Championships
- Kelly Cups: 2019

The Newfoundland Growlers were a professional minor league ice hockey team in the ECHL based in St. John's, Newfoundland and Labrador. The team began play in the 2018–19 season with home games held at Mary Brown's Centre. They were affiliated with the Toronto Maple Leafs of the National Hockey League (NHL) and Toronto Marlies of the American Hockey League (AHL). The ECHL terminated the team's membership in 2024 for failure to fulfill league bylaws.

== History ==
The search for a new professional hockey team for St. John's began after the Montreal Canadiens announced in July 2016 that their affiliate, the St. John's IceCaps of the American Hockey League (AHL), would move to the newly constructed Place Bell arena in Laval, Quebec for the start of the 2017–18 season. Danny Williams, from the incumbent franchise, stated his intention to find a replacement.

From that point two rival groups formed: the operators of the St. John's Edge basketball team, which played at the Mile One Centre, who wanted a Quebec Major Junior Hockey League (QMJHL) franchise for the arena; and another, led by local businessman Dean MacDonald and Glenn Stanford of the former IceCaps, who were looking for an ECHL team.

The ECHL franchise was conditionally approved but was delayed in late January 2018 after the dispute with the St. John's Edge ownership group over arena rights went to arbitration. After the lease issue was settled, the ECHL officially approved St. John's application on March 13, 2018, placing the team in the North Division of the Eastern Conference for the 2018–19 season. The ECHL ownership group reportedly created a partnership with the Toronto Maple Leafs, which would bring the organization back to St. John's for the first time since the team relocated their AHL affiliate, the St. John's Maple Leafs, to Toronto in 2005. The affiliation was confirmed on June 14. Among the names considered for the new franchise were Shamrocks, Storm, Regiment, and Newfoundland Growlers. The team announced its name as the Newfoundland Growlers on May 22. The name refers to the Newfoundland dog, specifically the World War I mascot of the Royal Newfoundland Regiment, Sable Chief. Ryane Clowe, a Newfoundland native, previously an assistant coach with the New Jersey Devils, was named head coach on June 20. John Snowden was added as assistant coach on July 19 after serving in the same capacity for the Maple Leafs' previous ECHL affiliate, the Orlando Solar Bears.

The Growlers played their first game on October 12, 2018, a 3–2 win over the Florida Everblades in front of a sold-out arena. In January 2019, Clowe stepped down due to health concerns and was replaced by assistant coach John Snowden. The Growlers finished the season first in their division with 94 points. The Growlers then advanced to the finals of the 2019 playoffs defeating the Toledo Walleye in six games to win the Kelly Cup. The Growlers were the second team after the 1989–90 Greensboro Monarchs to win the ECHL championship in its first season of operations. They were also the first Canadian team to win the Cup.

The Growlers did not defend their title in 2020 as the playoffs were cancelled due to the onset of the COVID-19 pandemic. The club then voluntarily suspended operations for the 2020–21 ECHL season due to ongoing pandemic travel restrictions. In the 2021 offseason, head coach John Snowden was hired by the Growlers' AHL affiliate, the Toronto Marlies, as an assistant coach with Eric Wellwood later named head coach for the 2021–22 season. With Wellwood unavailable in February 2022 due to COVID-19 protocols, the Growlers hired Danielle Goyette as a temporary assistant coach, making Goyette the first woman to coach an ECHL team.

=== Mascot ===
Buddy the Puffin served as the mascot of the Growlers. Buddy, a longtime sports mascot in St. John's, was previously the mascot of the St. John's Maple Leafs and later the St. John's IceCaps. Buddy wore number 92, which represents 1992, the year that he was introduced as the mascot of the St. John's Maple Leafs. Chris Abbott, the man who wore Buddy's costume, died in 2022. Buddy was then retired by the Growlers. In December 2022, the Growlers introduced Buddy Jr. sporting the number 22. Buddy was also the mascot for the St. John's Edge basketball team.

=== 2021 arena dispute ===
In July 2021, co-tenant of Mile One Centre, the St. John's Edge basketball team, were not given the option to renew their lease despite being in negotiations with the Growlers ownership, Deacon Sports and Entertainment (DSE), to purchase the Edge. This led to a dispute between DSE and the City of St. John's as the Growlers still needed to renew their lease agreement as well, which they did, signing a three-year agreement in August 2021. However, the operations of the arena was continued to be criticized by DSE and tickets were not being sold a week before their first scheduled home game of the 2021–22 season.

On October 27, 2021, citing workplace harassment of arena employees, the city voted to evict the team, which elicited the threat of a lawsuit from DSE. A third-party investigation was undertaken. The Growlers initially scheduled their first six home games for the Coca-Cola Coliseum in Toronto, the home of their AHL parent club, the Toronto Marlies, in case they could not secure a local arena. They subsequently came to an agreement with the nearby town of Conception Bay South to play their first six games at the CBS Arena. On November 18, DSE and the city of St. John's came to an agreement to play the rest of the season at the Mile One Centre, renamed Mary Brown's Centre, in early November.

=== End of operations ===
On April 2, 2024, the ECHL terminated the team's membership for failure to fulfill league bylaws. Both the Growlers and their sister team, the Trois-Rivières Lions, had been experiencing financial difficulties. The ECHL assumed transitional ownership of the Trois-Rivières Lions pending the franchise's sale to new owners. As a result of cessation, all eligible Growlers' players signed to a standard player contract were released as unrestricted free agents, allowing other league members to sign up to two former players. (Note: Former Growlers signed to a new club are ineligible for their new club's protected list and will become free agents at the conclusion of the season, with the exception of Serron Noel, whose rights will return to the Allen Americans as part of an unpaid future consideration by Newfoundland.) Contrarily, all Growlers players under an AHL or NHL structured contract were deemed ineligible to play the six remaining games of the 2023–24 ECHL season.

The St. John's market is currently served by the QMJHL's Newfoundland Regiment.

== Season-by-season records ==
| Regular season | | | | | | | | | | Playoffs | | | | |
| Season | GP | W | L | OTL | SOL | Pts | GF | GA | Standing | Year | 1st round | 2nd round | 3rd round | Kelly Cup |
|---|---|---|---|---|---|---|---|---|---|---|---|---|---|---|
| 2018–19 | 72 | 43 | 21 | 4 | 4 | 94 | 258 | 207 | 1st, North | 2019 | W, 4–2, BRM | W, 4–2, MAN | W, 4–1, FLA | W, 4–2, TOL |
| 2019–20 | 60 | 42 | 17 | 0 | 1 | 85 | 240 | 177 | 1st, North | 2020 | Season cancelled due to the COVID-19 pandemic | | | |
| 2020–21 | Opted out of participating due to the ongoing COVID-19 pandemic | | | | | | | | | 2021 | did not participate | | | |
| 2021–22 | 67 | 42 | 20 | 4 | 1 | 89 | 262 | 191 | 2nd, North | 2022 | W, 4–3, TRL | W, 4–3, REA | L, 1–4, FLA | — |
| 2022–23 | 72 | 48 | 22 | 2 | 0 | 98 | 271 | 217 | 1st, North | 2023 | W, 4–1, ADK | W, 4–1, REA | L, 2–4, FLA | — |
| 2023–24 | 66 | 28 | 28 | 8 | 2 | 66 | 220 | 234 | Ceased operations before conclusion of season | 2024 | — | | | |
| Totals | 337 | 203 | 108 | 18 | 8 | 432 | 1,251 | 1,026 | – | | | | | |
