= 2024 Kelly Cup playoffs =

2024 ECHL playoffs

Tournament details
- Dates: April 17 – June 8
- Teams: 16

Final positions
- Champions: Florida Everblades
- Runners-up: Kansas City Mavericks

Tournament statistics
- Scoring leader(s): Bobo Carpenter; Oliver Chau (Florida) (23)

Awards
- MVP: Oliver Chau (Florida)

The 2024 Kelly Cup playoffs of the ECHL hockey league began on April 17, 2024, following the conclusion of the 2023–24 ECHL regular season and ended on June 8, with the Florida Everblades winning their third consecutive and fourth overall Kelly Cup championship over the Kansas City Mavericks in five games, becoming the first team in ECHL history to three-peat.

== Playoff format ==
Due to the Newfoundland Growlers ceasing operations on April 2, 2024, without playing their final six games (against the Norfolk Admirals and Trois-Rivières Lions), the North Division utilized points percentage to determine its final standings, as well as potential home-ice advantage in the Eastern Conference or Kelly Cup Finals; the remaining three divisions utilized a traditional points system. The top four teams in the South, Central, and Mountain divisions qualified for the playoffs based on highest point total earned in the season.

Despite tying in points percentage, the Maine Mariners qualified over the Worcester Railers due to holding the tiebreaker of a higher regulation win percentage. The Kansas City Mavericks, who won the Brabham Cup as regular season champions, were the first to clinch a playoff spot with a 7–4 win over Tulsa.

The first two rounds of the playoffs are held within the division with the first seed facing the fourth seed and the second seed facing the third. The division champions then play each other in a conference championship. The Kelly Cup finals pits the Eastern Conference champion against the Western Conference champion. All four rounds are a best-of-seven format. The Kansas City Mavericks, as Brabham Cup winners, are scheduled to have home ice advantage for all the rounds they advance in.

Ten out of the 16 teams in this year's playoffs were participants in the previous Kelly Cup playoffs.

== Playoff seeds ==
After the regular season, 16 teams qualified for the playoffs.

Final seeds and points:

=== Eastern Conference ===
==== North Division ====
- Adirondack Thunder – Division champions, .674 points percentage, 97 points
- Norfolk Admirals – .645 points percentage, 89 points
- Trois-Rivières Lions – .507 points percentage, 70 points
- Maine Mariners – .500 points percentage, 72 points

==== South Division ====
- Greenville Swamp Rabbits – Division champions, 93 pts
- Jacksonville Icemen – 91 pts
- Florida Everblades – 89 pts
- Orlando Solar Bears – 86 pts

=== Western Conference ===
==== Central Division ====
- Toledo Walleye – Division champions, 105 pts
- Indy Fuel – 86 pts
- Wheeling Nailers – 81 pts
- Kalamazoo Wings – 80 pts

==== Mountain Division ====
- Kansas City Mavericks – Brabham Cup winners, Division champions, 114 pts
- Idaho Steelheads – 100 pts
- Allen Americans – 70 pts
- Tulsa Oilers – 69 pts

== Playoff bracket ==
Division Semifinals	Division Finals
N1	Adirondack	4
N4	Maine	3
N1	Adirondack	4
North Division
N2	Norfolk	2
N2	Norfolk	4
N3	Trois-Rivières	2
Eastern Conference
S1	Greenville	2
S4	Orlando	4
S4	Orlando	1
South Division
S3	Florida	4
S2	Jacksonville	3
S3	Florida	4
C1	Toledo	4
C4	Kalamazoo	0
C1	Toledo	4
Central Division
C3	Wheeling	0
C2	Indy	1
C3	Wheeling	4
Western Conference
M1	Kansas City	4
M4	Tulsa	0
M1	Kansas City	4
Mountain Division
M2	Idaho	1
M2	Idaho	4
M3	Allen	1

Conference Finals
N1	Adirondack	2
S3	Florida	4
C1	Toledo	2
M1	Kansas City	4

Kelly Cup Finals
S3	Florida	4
M1	Kansas City	1

== Division semifinals ==
Note: All times listed are in EDT (UTC−4).

=== North Division ===
==== (1) Adirondack Thunder vs. (4) Maine Mariners ====
April 19	Maine Mariners	2–1	Adirondack Thunder	Cool Insuring Arena	Recap
Adam Mechura (1) – pp – 12:46		First period	No scoring
Wyllum Deveaux (1) – 7:49		Second period	11:41 – pp – Tristan Ashbrook (1)
No scoring		Third period	No scoring
Brad Arvanitis 35 saves / 36 shots		Goalie stats	Isaac Poulter 19 saves / 21 shots

April 21	Maine Mariners	0–2	Adirondack Thunder	Cool Insuring Arena	Recap
No scoring		First period	9:15 – Shane Harper (1); 15:05 – pp – Shane Harper (2)
No scoring		Second period	No scoring
No scoring		Third period	No scoring
Brad Arvanitis 22 saves / 24 shots		Goalie stats	Isaac Poulter 21 saves / 21 shots

April 26	Adirondack Thunder	1–4	Maine Mariners	Cross Insurance Arena	Recap
Andre Ghantous (1) – 14:34		First period	7:48 – Tyler Drevitch (1); 11:37 – Andrew Peski (1)
No scoring		Second period	No scoring
No scoring		Third period	18:17 – en – Owen Pederson (1); 19:18 – pp-en – Brooklyn Kalmikov (1)
Isaac Poulter 24 saves / 26 shots		Goalie stats	Brad Arvanitis 28 saves / 29 shots

April 27	Adirondack Thunder	5–3	Maine Mariners	Cross Insurance Arena	Recap
Yushiroh Hirano (1) – 7:04		First period	4:48 – pp – Chase Zieky (1); 12:30 – sh – Owen Pederson (2)
No scoring		Second period	16:42 – Ethan Ritchie (1)
Tristan Ashbrook (2) – 7:17; Ryan Wheeler (1) – 12:26; Shane Harper (3) – pp – 14:23; Travis Broughman (1) – en – 18:58		Third period	No scoring
Jeremy Brodeur 19 saves / 22 shots		Goalie stats	Brad Arvanitis 19 saves / 23 shots

April 28	Adirondack Thunder	3–0	Maine Mariners	Cross Insurance Arena	Recap
No scoring		First period	No scoring
Ryan Wheeler (2) – 3:35		Second period	No scoring
Filip Engarås (1) – 2:09; Tristan Ashbrook (3) – en – 19:38		Third period	No scoring
Isaac Poulter 32 saves / 32 shots		Goalie stats	Shane Starrett 27 saves / 29 shots

April 30	Maine Mariners	2–1	Adirondack Thunder	Cool Insuring Arena	Recap
Ethan Ritchie (2) – pp – 16:53		First period	No scoring
No scoring		Second period	17:37 – Tristan Ashbrook (4)
Owen Pederson (3) – sh – 8:17		Third period	No scoring
Brad Arvanitis 27 saves / 28 shots		Goalie stats	Isaac Poulter 21 saves / 23 shots

May 1	Maine Mariners	0–2	Adirondack Thunder	Cool Insuring Arena	Recap
No scoring		First period	No scoring
No scoring		Second period	11:30 – Ryan Wheeler (3)
No scoring		Third period	17:46 – en – Tristan Ashbrook (5)
Brad Arvanitis 23 saves / 24 shots		Goalie stats	Isaac Poulter 21 saves / 21 shots

Adirondack won series 4–3

==== (2) Norfolk Admirals vs. (3) Trois-Rivières Lions ====
April 17	Norfolk Admirals	4–2	Trois-Rivières Lions	Colisée Vidéotron	Recap
No scoring		First period	No scoring
Brady Fleurent (1) – pp – 3:28; Gehrett Sargis (1) – 5:13		Second period	No scoring
Brady Fleurent (2) – pp-en – 19:04; Carson Musser (1) – en – 19:56		Third period	4:58 – Cédric Montminy (1); 19:37 – pp – Cédric Montminy (2)
Oskari Salminen 33 saves / 35 shots		Goalie stats	Zachary Émond 21 saves / 23 shots

April 19	Norfolk Admirals	4–5	Trois-Rivières Lions	Colisée Vidéotron	Recap
Carson Musser (2) – 13:48		First period	1:29 – Tyler Hylland (1); 9:17 – Cédric Montminy (3)
No scoring		Second period	5:40 – Jakov Novak (1); 10:04 – Anthony Beauregard (1)
Brandon Osmundson (1) – 9:42; Brandon Osmundson (2) – 18:36; Brady Fleurent (3) – 19:24		Third period	11:36 – pp – Cédric Montminy (4)
Yaniv Perets 20 saves / 25 shots		Goalie stats	Zachary Émond 21 saves / 25 shots

April 20	Norfolk Admirals	2–1	Trois-Rivières Lions	Colisée Vidéotron	Recap
No scoring		First period	No scoring
Josh McDougall (1) – 9:28; Josh McDougall (2) – 12:36		Second period	17:21 – pp – Nicolas Yaremko (1)
No scoring		Third period	No scoring
Yaniv Perets 24 saves / 25 shots		Goalie stats	Zachary Émond 24 saves / 26 shots

April 24	Trois-Rivières Lions	3–6	Norfolk Admirals	Norfolk Scope	Recap
No scoring		First period	10:58 – Gehrett Sargis (2); 11:38 – Austen Keating (1); 18:27 – Gehrett Sargis (3)
Cédric Montminy (5) – 7:02; Jakov Novak (2) – 15:07		Second period	0:22 – Thomas Caron (1)
Jacob Paquette (1) – 8:27		Third period	15:28 – pp – Simon Kubicek (1); 17:24 – en – Darick Louis-Jean (1)
Zachary Émond 24 saves / 29 shots		Goalie stats	Yaniv Perets 29 saves / 32 shots

April 27	Trois-Rivières Lions	4–2	Norfolk Admirals	Norfolk Scope	Recap
Chris Jandric (1) – pp – 6:36		First period	No scoring
Jakov Novak (3) – 4:24; Jakov Novak (4) – 17:50		Second period	9:03 – Danny Katic (1); 17:28 – Austen Keating (2)
Nicolas Guay (1) – 5:50		Third period	No scoring
Zachary Émond 24 saves / 26 shots		Goalie stats	Yaniv Perets 18 saves / 22 shots

April 28	Trois-Rivières Lions	3–4	Norfolk Admirals	Norfolk Scope	Recap
Jakov Novak (5) – 10:49		First period	16:55 – Carson Golder (1); 18:40 – pp – Carson Golder (2)
No scoring		Second period	10:21 – Stepan Timofeyev (1)
Jakov Novak (6) – 8:55; Nicolas Guay (2) – pp – 18:30		Third period	11:43 – Carson Musser (3)
Zachary Émond 24 saves / 28 shots		Goalie stats	Yaniv Perets 21 saves / 24 shots

Norfolk won series 4–2

=== South Division ===
==== (1) Greenville Swamp Rabbits vs. (4) Orlando Solar Bears ====
April 21	Orlando Solar Bears	1–0	OT	Greenville Swamp Rabbits	Bon Secours Wellness Arena	Recap
No scoring		First period		No scoring
No scoring		Second period		No scoring
No scoring		Third period		No scoring
Spencer Kersten (1) – 12:22		First overtime period		No scoring
Evan Fitzpatrick 43 saves / 43 shots		Goalie stats		Jacob Ingham 28 saves / 29 shots

April 22	Orlando Solar Bears	2–4	Greenville Swamp Rabbits	Bon Secours Wellness Arena	Recap
No scoring		First period	No scoring
No scoring		Second period	2:28 – Josh McKechney (1); 11:27 – pp – Carter Souch (1)
Brayden Low (1) – 2:09; Spencer Kersten (2) – 3:45		Third period	4:36 – Tanner Eberle (1); 18:50 – Quinn Olson (1)
Evan Fitzpatrick 35 saves / 39 shots		Goalie stats	Jacob Ingham 10 saves / 12 shots Luke Richardson 11 saves / 11 shots

April 26	Greenville Swamp Rabbits	1–2	OT	Orlando Solar Bears	Kia Center	Recap
Quinn Olson (2) – pp – 14:50		First period		No scoring
No scoring		Second period		12:45 – Luke Boka (1)
No scoring		Third period		No scoring
No scoring		First overtime period		12:06 – Darik Angeli (1)
Jacob Ingham 36 saves / 38 shots		Goalie stats		Evan Fitzpatrick 32 saves / 33 shots

April 27	Greenville Swamp Rabbits	5–3	Orlando Solar Bears	Kia Center	Recap
Tanner Eberle (2) – 1:12; Colton Young (1) – pp – 6:58		First period	No scoring
Tanner Eberle (3) – 19:29		Second period	13:06 – Spencer Kersten (3)
Ethan Somoza (1) – 2:05; Ben Freeman (1) – pp – 4:43		Third period	8:56 – pp – Spencer Kersten (4); 9:42 – Jesse Jacques (1)
Luke Richardson 33 saves / 36 shots		Goalie stats	Evan Fitzpatrick 21 saves / 26 shots

April 28	Greenville Swamp Rabbits	5–6	OT	Orlando Solar Bears	Kia Center	Recap
Bobby Russell (1) – pp – 9:41; Brannon McManus (1) – 14:09; Colton Young (2) – 14:43		First period		3:31 – Spencer Kersten (5)
Bobby Russell (2) – 9:58; Carter Souch (2) – 16:55		Second period		3:14 – pp – Tyler Bird (1); 14:24 – Luke Boka (2)
No scoring		Third period		1:08 – Jesse Jacques (2); 16:52 – Aaron Luchuk (1)
No scoring		First overtime period		1:40 – Brayden Low (2)
Jacob Ingham 37 saves / 43 shots		Goalie stats		Evan Fitzpatrick 32 saves / 37 shots

April 30	Orlando Solar Bears	5–1	Greenville Swamp Rabbits	Bon Secours Wellness Arena	Recap
No scoring		First period	No scoring
Jaydon Dureau (1) – pp – 14:04; Jaydon Dureau (2) – 19:30		Second period	No scoring
Spencer Kersten (6) – 3:28; Aaron Luchuk (2) – en – 16:13; Tyler Bird (2) – en – 19:33		Third period	15:33 – Colton Young (3)
Evan Fitzpatrick 46 saves / 47 shots		Goalie stats	Jacob Ingham 16 saves / 19 shots

Orlando won series 4–2

==== (2) Jacksonville Icemen vs. (3) Florida Everblades ====
April 18	Florida Everblades	0–4	Jacksonville Icemen	VyStar Veterans Memorial Arena	Recap
No scoring		First period	19:04 – pp – Christopher Brown (1)
No scoring		Second period	No scoring
No scoring		Third period	2:39 – pp – Olivier Nadeau (1); 16:59 – sh – en – Jerry D'Amigo (1); 17:54 – pp – Derek Lodermeier (1)
Cam Johnson 26 saves / 29 shots		Goalie stats	Matt Vernon 28 saves / 28 shots

April 21	Florida Everblades	2–1	OT	Jacksonville Icemen	VyStar Veterans Memorial Arena	Recap
Sean Josling (1) – 14:56		First period		No scoring
No scoring		Second period		12:59 – pp – Derek Lodermeier (2)
No scoring		Third period		No scoring
Matt Wedman (1) – 8:24		First overtime period		No scoring
Cam Johnson 26 saves / 27 shots		Goalie stats		Matt Vernon 26 saves / 28 shots

April 24	Jacksonville Icemen	4–3	OT	Florida Everblades	Hertz Arena	Recap
Derek Lodermeier (3) – 4:30; Garrett Van Wyhe (1) – 8:15		First period		No scoring
Damien Giroux (1) – 10:49		Second period		10:16 – Sean Josling (2); 14:38 – Joe Pendenza (1); 16:08 – Jordan Sambrook (1)
No scoring		Third period		No scoring
Derek Lodermeier (4) – 3:45		First overtime period		No scoring
Matt Vernon 32 saves / 35 shots		Goalie stats		Cam Johnson 35 saves / 39 shots

April 26	Jacksonville Icemen	5–0	Florida Everblades	Hertz Arena	Recap
No scoring		First period	No scoring
Matt Iacopelli (1) – 7:08; Damien Giroux (2) – 9:36; Olivier Nadeau (2) – pp – 11:19		Second period	No scoring
Christopher Brown (2) – 8:15; Ryan Scarfo (1) – en – 16:20		Third period	No scoring
Matt Vernon 31 saves / 31 shots		Goalie stats	Cam Johnson 27 saves / 31 shots

April 27	Jacksonville Icemen	1–3	Florida Everblades	Hertz Arena	Recap
No scoring		First period	19:35 – Bobo Carpenter (1)
Chris Grando (1) – 10:10		Second period	1:34 – Logan Lambdin (1); 17:00 – Mark Senden (1)
No scoring		Third period	No scoring
Matt Vernon 28 saves / 31 shots		Goalie stats	Cam Johnson 27 saves / 28 shots

April 30	Florida Everblades	4–1	Jacksonville Icemen	VyStar Veterans Memorial Arena	Recap
No scoring		First period	No scoring
Bobo Carpenter (2) – 5:04; Cole Moberg (1) – 7:07; Logan Lambdin (2) – 16:37		Second period	No scoring
Bobo Carpenter (3) – en – 18:01		Third period	15:45 – pp – Justin McRae (1)
Cam Johnson 24 saves / 25 shots		Goalie stats	Matt Vernon 23 saves / 26 shots

May 1	Florida Everblades	4–0	Jacksonville Icemen	VyStar Veterans Memorial Arena	Recap
No scoring		First period	No scoring
Will Reilly (1) – 2:24; Sean Josling (3) – 4:36; Cameron Darcy (1) – 6:26; Cole Moberg (2) – sh – 18:48		Second period	No scoring
No scoring		Third period	No scoring
Cam Johnson 27 saves / 27 shots		Goalie stats	Matt Vernon 26 saves / 30 shots

Florida won series 4–3

=== Central Division ===
==== (1) Toledo Walleye vs. (4) Kalamazoo Wings ====
April 19	Kalamazoo Wings	2–3	OT	Toledo Walleye	Huntington Center	Recap
No scoring		First period		No scoring
Ayden MacDonald (1) – 9:50; Ayden MacDonald (2) – pp – 12:58		Second period		13:25 – Riley Sawchuk (1); 18:29 – Riley Sawchuk (2)
No scoring		Third period		No scoring
No scoring		First overtime period		2:29 – Brandon Hawkins (1)
Hunter Vorva 37 saves / 40 shots		Goalie stats		John Lethemon 25 saves / 27 shots

April 20	Kalamazoo Wings	2–5	Toledo Walleye	Huntington Center	Recap
Chad Nychuk (1) – 13:42; Quinn Preston (1) – 18:08		First period	9:12 – Conlan Keenan (1)
No scoring		Second period	3:57 – Mitch Lewandowski (1)
No scoring		Third period	13:47 – Sam Craggs (1); 18:27 – Sam Craggs (2); 18:42 – en – Sam Craggs (3)
Jonathan Lemieux 48 saves / 52 shots		Goalie stats	Jan Bednář 22 saves / 24 shots

April 24	Toledo Walleye	6–2	Kalamazoo Wings	Wings Event Center	Recap
Sam Craggs (4) – 5:35; Grant Gabriele (1) – 6:48; Jacob Graves (1) – 15:58		First period	4:56 – Quinn Preston (2); 5:22 – Jordan Seyfert (1)
Riley Sawchuk (3) – pp – 5:28; Brandon Hawkins (2) – 7:48		Second period	No scoring
Trenton Bliss (1) – en – 17:19		Third period	No scoring
John Lethemon 29 saves / 31 shots		Goalie stats	Hunter Vorva 30 saves / 35 shots

April 26	Toledo Walleye	4–2	Kalamazoo Wings	Wings Event Center	Recap
Riley McCourt (1) – 12:13		First period	No scoring
Trenton Bliss (2) – 0:18; Trenton Bliss (3) – 11:54		Second period	12:24 – Chad Nychuk (2); 19:00 – Luke Morgan (1)
Brandon Kruse (1) – 5:57		Third period	No scoring
Jan Bednář 35 saves / 37 shots		Goalie stats	Hunter Vorva 24 saves / 28 shots

Toledo won series 4–0

==== (2) Indy Fuel vs. (3) Wheeling Nailers ====
Wheeling played games three and four at WesBanco Arena in Wheeling and game five at the UPMC Lemieux Sports Complex in Cranberry, Pennsylvania.

April 19	Wheeling Nailers	2–5	Indy Fuel	Indiana Farmers Coliseum	Recap
No scoring		First period	9:30 – pp – Kyle Maksimovich (1)
Davis Bunz (1) – 1:21		Second period	5:07 – Bryan Lemos (1); 6:04 – Kyle Maksimovich (2); 12:23 – Andrew Bellant (1)
Dillon Hamaliuk (1) – pp – 11:55		Third period	16:03 – pp – Kale Howarth (1)
Jaxon Castor 26 saves / 31 shots		Goalie stats	Mitchell Weeks 18 saves / 20 shots

April 20	Wheeling Nailers	7–1	Indy Fuel	Indiana Farmers Coliseum	Recap
Matt Koopman (1) – 6:06; Evan Vierling (1) – pp – 19:56		First period	No scoring
Jordan Martel (1) – 7:27; Jordan Martel (2) – 7:48; Justin Lee (1) – 17:02; Jared Westcott (1) – 18:05		Second period	No scoring
Evan Vierling (2) – pp – 9:21		Third period	15:18 – pp – Cam Hausinger (1)
Jaxon Castor 20 saves / 21 shots		Goalie stats	Zach Driscoll 16 saves / 22 shots Mitchell Weeks 6 saves / 7 shots

April 22	Indy Fuel	2–3	OT	Wheeling Nailers	WesBanco Arena	Recap
No scoring		First period		11:40 – Isaac Belliveau (1)
10:02 – Kyle Maksimovich (3)		Second period		15:18 – Davis Bunz (2)
13:39 – Andrew Perrott (1)		Third period		No scoring
No scoring		First overtime period		0:30 – Justin Addamo (1)
Mitchell Weeks 22 saves / 25 shots		Goalie stats		Jaxon Castor 31 saves / 33 shots

April 23	Indy Fuel	0–3	Wheeling Nailers	WesBanco Arena	Recap
No scoring		First period	13:19 – pp – Jordan Martel (3)
No scoring		Second period	14:21 – pp – Jordan Martel (4)
No scoring		Third period	19:43 – en – David Jankowski (1)
Mitchell Weeks 20 saves / 22 shots		Goalie stats	Jaxon Castor 21 saves / 21 shots

April 27	Indy Fuel	2–4	Wheeling Nailers	UPMC Lemieux Sports Complex	Recap
15:49 – Ross MacDougall (1)		First period	No scoring
19:48 – Santino Centorame (1)		Second period	2:21 – sh – Matt Koopman (2); 6:24 – pp – Justin Addamo (2); 14:04 – Justin Addamo (3)
No scoring		Third period	19:08 – en – Matt Koopman (3)
Mitchell Weeks 16 saves / 19 shots		Goalie stats	Jaxon Castor 37 saves / 39 shots

Wheeling won series 4–1

=== Mountain Division ===
==== (1) Kansas City Mavericks vs. (4) Tulsa Oilers ====
April 17	Tulsa Oilers	2–4	Kansas City Mavericks	Cable Dahmer Arena	Recap
Mike McKee (1) – 0:40		First period	No scoring
Eddie Matsushima (1) – 2:24		Second period	10:43 – Jake Jaremko (1)
No scoring		Third period	2:53 – Nolan Walker (1); 8:50 – Nate Knoepke (1); 19:47 – en – Patrick Curry (1)
Julian Junca 32 saves / 35 shots		Goalie stats	Cale Morris 34 saves / 36 shots

April 18	Tulsa Oilers	2–3	Kansas City Mavericks	Cable Dahmer Arena	Recap
Alec Butcher (1) – 6:01		First period	No scoring
No scoring		Second period	8:47 – Bradley Schoonbaert (1); 12:33 – pp – Patrick Curry (2)
Michael Farren (1) – 11:42		Third period	17:19 – David Cotton (1)
Julian Junca 26 saves / 29 shots		Goalie stats	Jack LaFontaine 38 saves / 40 shots

April 19	Kansas City Mavericks	3–1	Tulsa Oilers	BOK Center	Recap
Justin Nachbaur (1) – 13:06		First period	No scoring
Jeremy McKenna (1) – 2:05		Second period	No scoring
Patrick Curry (3) – en – 19:17		Third period	4:55 – Jamie Rome (1)
Cale Morris 27 saves / 28 shots		Goalie stats	Julian Junca 21 saves / 23 shots

April 22	Kansas City Mavericks	2–1	Tulsa Oilers	BOK Center	Recap
Cade Borchardt (1) – 18:23		First period	18:10 – Mike McKee (2)
Cade Borchardt (2) – pp – 8:42		Second period	No scoring
No scoring		Third period	No scoring
Jack LaFontaine 32 saves / 33 shots		Goalie stats	Julian Junca 29 saves / 31 shots

Kansas City won series 4–0

==== (2) Idaho Steelheads vs. (3) Allen Americans ====
April 22	Allen Americans	5–6	OT	Idaho Steelheads	Idaho Central Arena	Recap
Colby McAuley (1) – 7:34; Colin Jacobs (1) – pp – 13:51		First period		15:21 – pp – Mark Rassell (1)
Liam Finlay (1) – pp – 13:01; Chaz Smedsrud (1) – 14:16		Second period		8:15 – pp – Wade Murphy (1); 18:22 – Patrick Kudla (1); 19:15 – Matthew Register (1)
James Hardie (1) – 4:46		Third period		7:42 – pp – Patrick Kudla (2)
No scoring		First overtime period		0:23 – Mark Rassell (2)
Marco Costantini 33 saves / 39 shots		Goalie stats		Jake Kielly 27 saves / 32 shots

April 24	Allen Americans	0–5	Idaho Steelheads	Idaho Central Arena	Recap
No scoring		First period	1:36 – Wade Murphy (2); 4:46 – Mark Rassell (3); 5:54 – Matthew Register (2)
No scoring		Second period	No scoring
No scoring		Third period	6:28 – Ty Pelton-Byce (1); 12:09 – pp – Mark Rassell (4)
Mark Sinclair 33 saves / 38 shots		Goalie stats	Jake Kielly 28 saves / 28 shots

April 26	Idaho Steelheads	1–5	Allen Americans	Credit Union of Texas Event Center	Recap
No scoring		First period	3:16 – Colin Jacobs (2); 11:03 – Hank Crone (1)
No scoring		Second period	6:21 – Easton Brodzinski (1); 18:26 – sh – Bennett MacArthur (1)
Will Merchant (1) – 0:19		Third period	Easton Brodzinski (2) – 13:15
Jake Kielly 17 saves / 21 shots Bryan Thomson 7 saves / 8 shots		Goalie stats	Marco Costantini 35 saves / 36 shots

April 27	Idaho Steelheads	5–1	Allen Americans	Credit Union of Texas Event Center	Recap
Ty Pelton-Byce (2) – pp – 1:29; Nick Canade (1) – 8:25		First period	3:38 – Bennett MacArthur (2)
Will Merchant (2) – 0:36; Keaton Mastrodonato (1) – 3:13		Second period	No scoring
Ty Pelton-Byce (3) – en – 18:28		Third period	No scoring
Bryan Thomson 29 saves / 30 shots		Goalie stats	Marco Costantini 26 saves / 30 shots

April 28	Idaho Steelheads	5–3	Allen Americans	Credit Union of Texas Event Center	Recap
Wade Murphy (3) – 7:04		First period	8:13 – James Hardie (2)
Mark Rassell (5) – 2:27; Francesco Arcuri (1) – 9:04		Second period	No scoring
Wade Murphy (4) – 9:57; Keaton Mastrodonato (2) – 13:13		Third period	5:51 – Kris Myllari (1); 13:43 – Kameron Kielly (1)
Bryan Thomson 34 saves / 37 shots		Goalie stats	Mark Sinclair 27 saves / 32 shots

Idaho won series 4–1

== Division finals ==
Note: All times listed are in EDT (UTC−4).

=== North Division ===
==== (1) Adirondack Thunder vs. (2) Norfolk Admirals ====
May 3	Norfolk Admirals	7–4	Adirondack Thunder	Cool Insuring Arena	Recap
Thomas Caron (2) – 2:01		First period	7:02 – pp – Yushiroh Hirano (2)
Keaton Jameson (1) – 0:52; Austen Keating (3) – 7:03		Second period	1:17 – Ryan Wheeler (4); 5:02 – Ryan Smith (1); 13:24 – pp – Ryan Smith (2)
Thomas Caron (3) – 1:45; Carson Golder (3) – 4:53; Stepan Timofeyev (2) – 6:58; Mathieu Roy (1) – en – 18:15		Third period	No scoring
Yaniv Perets 20 saves / 24 shots		Goalie stats	Isaac Poulter 28 saves / 34 shots Jeremy Brodeur 2 saves / 2 shots

May 4	Norfolk Admirals	5–2	Adirondack Thunder	Cool Insuring Arena	Recap
Keaton Jameson (2) – pp – 12:52		First period	No scoring
Stepan Timofeyev (3) – 16:58		Second period	11:30 – Yushiroh Hirano (3)
Danny Katic (2) – 7:54; Austen Keating (4) – 16:23; Mathieu Roy (2) – en – 19:54		Third period	2:33 – Tristan Ashbrook (6)
Yaniv Perets 41 saves / 43 shots		Goalie stats	Isaac Poulter 24 saves / 28 shots

May 8	Adirondack Thunder	2–1	OT	Norfolk Admirals	Norfolk Scope	Recap
Erik Middendorf (1) – pp – 12:04		First period		No scoring
No scoring		Second period		6:35 – pp – Simon Kubicek (2)
No scoring		Third period		No scoring
Ryan Smith (3) – 18:19		First overtime period		No scoring
Isaac Poulter 54 saves / 55 shots		Goalie stats		Yaniv Perets 27 saves / 29 shots

May 10	Adirondack Thunder	5–2	Norfolk Admirals	Norfolk Scope	Recap
Andre Ghantous (2) – 7:20; Ryan Smith (4) – 15:50		First period	No scoring
Ryan Smith (5) – 15:40		Second period	3:56 – pp – Mathieu Roy (3); 14:25 – Stepan Timofeyev (4)
Shane Harper (4) – 13:35; Zach Walker (1) – 14:07		Third period	No scoring
Jeremy Brodeur 36 saves / 38 shots		Goalie stats	Oskari Salminen 24 saves / 29 shots

May 11	Adirondack Thunder	2–1	Norfolk Admirals	Norfolk Scope	Recap
No scoring		First period	No scoring
No scoring		Second period	10:44 – Josh McDougall (3)
Yushiroh Hirano (4) – 12:02; Ryan Smith (6) – 14:36		Third period	No scoring
Isaac Poulter 21 saves / 22 shots		Goalie stats	Yaniv Perets 21 saves / 23 shots

May 14	Norfolk Admirals	1–5	Adirondack Thunder	Cool Insuring Arena	Recap
No scoring		First period	2:05 – Filip Engarås (2)
Brady Fleurent (4) – pp – 5:12		Second period	7:53 – Tristan Ashbrook (7); 14:58 – pp – Filip Engarås (3)
No scoring		Third period	8:40 – Filip Engarås (4); 10:28 – Shane Harper (5)
Yaniv Perets 24 saves / 29 shots		Goalie stats	Isaac Poulter 31 saves / 32 shots

Adirondack won series 4–2

=== South Division ===
==== (3) Florida Everblades vs. (4) Orlando Solar Bears ====
May 3	Orlando Solar Bears	1–5	Florida Everblades	Hertz Arena	Recap
Luke Boka (3) – 11:30		First period	0:16 – Cole Moberg (3); 5:41 – Will Reilly (2)
No scoring		Second period	4:21 – Cameron Darcy (2); 7:04 – Mark Senden (2)
No scoring		Third period	3:28 – pp – Sean Josling (4)
Evan Fitzpatrick 29 saves / 34 shots		Goalie stats	Cam Johnson 23 saves / 24 shots

May 4	Orlando Solar Bears	3–6	Florida Everblades	Hertz Arena	Recap
No scoring		First period	6:51 – Todd Skirving (1); 8:51 – Cole Moberg (4); 14:04 – pp – Sean Josling (5)
Jesse Jacques (3) – pp – 9:50; Kevin Lombardi (1) – 13:29		Second period	11:03 – Joe Pendenza (2); 13:14 – Oliver Chau (1)
Mitchell Hoelscher (1) – pp – 17:51		Third period	6:12 – pp – Joe Pendenza (3)
Evan Fitzpatrick 17 saves / 23 shots		Goalie stats	Cam Johnson 29 saves / 32 shots

May 7	Florida Everblades	4–2	Orlando Solar Bears	Kia Center	Recap
Zach Uens (1) – 8:56		First period	No scoring
Todd Skirving (2) – 16:58		Second period	17:16 – Mitchell Hoelscher (2)
Matt Wedman (2) – 10:52; Oliver Chau (2) – en – 19:05		Third period	4:30 – Darik Angeli (2)
Cam Johnson 33 saves / 35 shots		Goalie stats	Evan Fitzpatrick 16 saves / 19 shots

May 9	Florida Everblades	2–4	Orlando Solar Bears	Kia Center	Recap
No scoring		First period	7:37 – Marc-Andre Gaudet (1); 10:37 – Darik Angeli (3)
Matt Wedman (3) – 0:26		Second period	11:39 – Jaydon Dureau (3)
Logan Lambdin (3) – 2:19		Third period	19:33 – en – Darik Angeli (4)
Cam Johnson 30 saves / 33 shots		Goalie stats	Evan Fitzpatrick 37 saves / 39 shots

May 11	Florida Everblades	2–1	OT	Orlando Solar Bears	Kia Center	Recap
No scoring		First period		No scoring
Bobo Carpenter (4) – 11:46		Second period		No scoring
No scoring		Third period		19:09 – Mitchell Hoelscher (3)
Bobo Carpenter (5) – 13:56		First overtime period		No scoring
Cam Johnson 27 saves / 28 shots		Goalie stats		Evan Fitzpatrick 28 saves / 30 shots

Florida won series 4–1

=== Central Division ===
==== (1) Toledo Walleye vs. (3) Wheeling Nailers ====
May 3	Wheeling Nailers	1–2	OT	Toledo Walleye	Huntington Center	Recap
No scoring		First period		No scoring
Jordan Martel (5) – 12:23		Second period		No scoring
No scoring		Third period		14:40 – Mitch Lewandowski (2)
No scoring		First overtime period		10:51 – Brandon Hawkins (3)
Jaxon Castor 33 saves / 35 shots		Goalie stats		John Lethemon 23 saves / 24 shots

May 4	Wheeling Nailers	3–5	Toledo Walleye	Huntington Center	Recap
Justin Lee (2) – 17:13		First period	7:25 – Jason Willms (1); 17:50 – Mitch Lewandowski (3)
Isaac Belliveau (2) – 12:56		Second period	4:02 – Matt Anderson (1); 15:47 – Orrin Centazzo (1)
Justin Lee (3) – 8:57		Third period	19:11 – en – Riley Sawchuk (4)
Jaxon Castor 37 saves / 41 shots		Goalie stats	Jan Bednář 30 saves / 33 shots

May 8	Toledo Walleye	7–3	Wheeling Nailers	WesBanco Arena	Recap
Riley Sawchuk (5) – 2:44; Sam Craggs (5) – pp – 14:00; Brandon Kruse (2) – 18:19		First period	15:18 – sh – Matt Koopman (4)
Brandon Hawkins (4) – pp – 3:33; Riley Sawchuk (6) – pp – 11:28		Second period	7:03 – David Drake (1); 14:58 – Matthew Quercia (1)
Alexandre Doucet (1) – en – 17:45; Sam Craggs (6) – en – 18:51		Third period	No scoring
John Lethemon 19 saves / 22 shots		Goalie stats	Jaxon Castor 16 saves / 21 shots Garret Sparks 7 saves / 7 shots

May 10	Toledo Walleye	3–2	OT	Wheeling Nailers	WesBanco Arena	Recap
No scoring		First period		No scoring
16:54 – Brandon Hawkins (5)		Second period		8:09 – Dillon Hamaliuk (2)
1:32 – Chase Gresock (1)		Third period		9:17 – pp – Justin Addamo (4)
5:37 – Riley Sawchuk (7)		First overtime period		No scoring
Jan Bednář 24 saves / 26 shots		Goalie stats		Taylor Gauthier 33 saves / 36 shots

Toledo won series 4–0

=== Mountain Division ===
==== (1) Kansas City Mavericks vs. (2) Idaho Steelheads ====
May 4	Idaho Steelheads	2–4	Kansas City Mavericks	Cable Dahmer Arena	Recap
No scoring		First period	14:58 – David Cotton (2); 16:24 – Jacob Hayhurst (1)
No scoring		Second period	0:46 – David Cotton (3); 14:46 – sh – Jacob Hayhurst (2)
Patrick Kudla (3) – pp – 13:15; Jake Murray (1) – 19:28		Third period	No scoring
Bryan Thomson 29 saves / 33 shots		Goalie stats	Cale Morris 24 saves / 26 shots

May 5	Idaho Steelheads	3–2	Kansas City Mavericks	Cable Dahmer Arena	Recap
No scoring		First period	16:27 – David Cotton (4)
Jordan Kawaguchi (1) – 6:24		Second period	15:02 – pp – Cole Coskey (1)
Keaton Mastrodonato (3) – 4:18; Ty Pelton-Byce (4) – 8:37		Third period	No scoring
Bryan Thomson 27 saves / 29 shots		Goalie stats	Jack LaFontaine 29 saves / 32 shots

May 8	Kansas City Mavericks	7–5	Idaho Steelheads	Idaho Central Arena	Recap
Patrick Curry (4) – 0:36; Cade Borchardt (3) – 9:25; Cole Coskey (2) – 16:12; Jeremy McKenna (2) – 19:40		First period	17:40 – Wade Murphy (5)
David Cotton (5) – 5:39		Second period	No scoring
Bradley Schoonbaert (2) – 10:42; Nolan Walker (2) – 16:50		Third period	4:54 – Ty Pelton-Byce (5); 7:26 – Jordan Kawaguchi (2); 15:09 – Keaton Mastrodonato (4); 15:37 – Lynden McCallum (1)
Cale Morris 35 saves / 40 shots		Goalie stats	Bryan Thomson 10 saves / 14 shots Jake Kielly 11 saves / 14 shots

May 10	Kansas City Mavericks	5–3	Idaho Steelheads	Idaho Central Arena	Recap
Patrick Curry (5) – 3:43		First period	No scoring
Nolan Walker (3) – 4:15; Jeremy McKenna (3) – pp – 10:56		Second period	No scoring
Jake Jaremko (2) – pp – 10:18; Nolan Walker (4) – pp – 10:53		Third period	3:52 – Jordan Kawaguchi (3); 15:14 – Jordan Kawaguchi (4); 19:59 – A.J. White (1)
Cale Morris 36 saves / 39 shots		Goalie stats	Jake Kielly 23 saves / 28 shots

May 11	Kansas City Mavericks	4–3	OT	Idaho Steelheads	Idaho Central Arena	Recap
Jeremy McKenna (4) – 5:21; Max Andreev (1) – 13:58		First period		6:42 – A.J. White (2); 8:38 – Reece Harsch (1)
Patrick Curry (6) – 1:39		Second period		No scoring
No scoring		Third period		11:33 – A.J. White (3)
Cade Borchardt (4) – 12:21		First overtime period		No scoring
Jack LaFontaine 53 saves / 56 shots		Goalie stats		Bryan Thomson 47 saves / 51 shots

Kansas City won series 4–1

== Conference finals ==
Note: All times listed are in EDT (UTC−4).

=== Eastern Conference ===
==== (N1) Adirondack Thunder vs. (S3) Florida Everblades ====
May 17	Florida Everblades	2–1	Adirondack Thunder	Cool Insuring Arena	Recap
Mark Senden (3) – 11:54		First period	14:06 – Ryan Smith (7)
Mark Senden (4) – 18:08		Second period	No scoring
No scoring		Third period	No scoring
Cam Johnson 21 saves / 22 shots		Goalie stats	Isaac Poulter 29 saves / 31 shots

May 18	Florida Everblades	0–2	Adirondack Thunder	Cool Insuring Arena	Recap
No scoring		First period	4:16 – Shane Harper (6)
No scoring		Second period	5:20 – Ryan Smith (8)
No scoring		Third period	No scoring
Cam Johnson 28 saves / 30 shots		Goalie stats	Isaac Poulter 41 saves / 41 shots

May 22	Adirondack Thunder	0–4	Florida Everblades	Hertz Arena	Recap
No scoring		First period	6:33 – Jordan Sambrook (2); 12:38 – Mark Senden (5); 15:24 – pp – Matt Wedman (4)
No scoring		Second period	No scoring
No scoring		Third period	18:50 – en – Bobo Carpenter (6)
Isaac Poulter 20 saves / 23 shots Jeremy Brodeur 8 saves / 8 shots		Goalie stats	Cam Johnson 26 saves / 26 shots

May 24	Adirondack Thunder	0–3	Florida Everblades	Hertz Arena	Recap
No scoring		First period	14:30 – pp – Bobo Carpenter (7)
No scoring		Second period	5:06 – Mark Senden (6)
No scoring		Third period	2:52 – Sean Josling (6)
Isaac Poulter 31 saves / 34 shots		Goalie stats	Cam Johnson 24 saves / 24 shots

May 25	Adirondack Thunder	4–2	Florida Everblades	Hertz Arena	Recap
Filip Engarås (5) – 8:39; Erik Middendorf (2) – 15:33		First period	No scoring
No scoring		Second period	16:31 – Riese Zmolek (1); 18:32 – pp – Cole Moberg (5)
Ryan Smith (9) – 5:19; Tristan Ashbrook (8) – sh – en – 19:35		Third period	No scoring
Jeremy Brodeur 35 saves / 37 shots		Goalie stats	Cam Johnson 26 saves / 29 shots

May 28	Florida Everblades	4–3	Adirondack Thunder	Cool Insuring Arena	Recap
Josh Ho-Sang (1) – 8:38		First period	No scoring
Bobo Carpenter (8) – pp – 13:50		Second period	17:36 – pp – Filip Engarås (6)
Oliver Chau (3) – 3:47; Joe Pendenza (4) – sh – 6:41		Third period	9:19 – Filip Engarås (7); 10:53 – Timur Ibragimov (1)
Cam Johnson 30 saves / 33 shots		Goalie stats	Jeremy Brodeur 21 saves / 25 shots

Florida won series 4–2

=== Western Conference ===
==== (C1) Toledo Walleye vs. (M1) Kansas City Mavericks ====
May 17	Kansas City Mavericks	3–2	Toledo Walleye	Huntington Center	Recap
Jake McLaughlin (1) – 15:30; Cade Borchardt (5) – 19:45		First period	11:08 – Brandon Hawkins (6)
No scoring		Second period	11:40 – Riley Sawchuk (8)
Jacob Hayhurst (3) – 13:28		Third period	No scoring
Cale Morris 24 saves / 26 shots		Goalie stats	John Lethemon 19 saves / 22 shots

May 18	Kansas City Mavericks	5–1	Toledo Walleye	Huntington Center	Recap
No scoring		First period	17:45 – Brandon Kruse (3)
Ryan Jones (1) – 10:15; Max Andreev (2) – 19:54		Second period	No scoring
Jeremy McKenna (5) – 7:35; Jake McLaughlin (2) – en – 16:24; Patrick Curry (7) – en – 18:55		Third period	No scoring
Jack LaFontaine 39 saves / 40 shots		Goalie stats	Jan Bednář 21 saves / 24 shots

May 20	Kansas City Mavericks	3–4	Toledo Walleye	Huntington Center	Recap
No scoring		First period	18:40 – pp – Riley Sawchuk (9)
Nate Knoepke (2) – 4:50; Nate Knoepke (3) – 16:32		Second period	12:03 – Michael Prapavessis (1); 16:51 – Riley Sawchuk (10); 19:13 – Conlan Keenan (2)
Nolan Walker (5) – 1:30		Third period	No scoring
Cale Morris 26 saves / 30 shots		Goalie stats	John Lethemon 25 saves / 28 shots

May 24	Toledo Walleye	1–2	OT	Kansas City Mavericks	Cable Dahmer Arena	Recap
No scoring		First period		No scoring
No scoring		Second period		No scoring
Matt Anderson (2) – 13:06		Third period		14:30 – Jake Jaremko (3)
No scoring		First overtime period		11:30 – Cole Coskey (3)
John Lethemon 25 saves / 27 shots		Goalie stats		Jack LaFontaine 36 saves / 37 shots

May 25	Toledo Walleye	3–1	Kansas City Mavericks	Cable Dahmer Arena	Recap
Brandon Hawkins (7) – pp – 9:20		First period	12:54 – pp – David Cotton (6)
No scoring		Second period	No scoring
Jacob Graves (2) – 1:49; Brandon Kruse (4) – en – 19:04		Third period	No scoring
John Lethemon 15 saves / 16 shots		Goalie stats	Cale Morris 24 saves / 26 shots

May 27	Toledo Walleye	1–7	Kansas City Mavericks	Cable Dahmer Arena	Recap
No scoring		First period	16:20 – Jeremy McKenna (6)
No scoring		Second period	8:12 – Jeremy McKenna (7); 10:58 – Cole Coskey (4)
Matt Anderson (3) – 9:01		Third period	1:28 – Jeremy McKenna (8); 6:16 – Max Andreev (3); 14:42 – en – Theo Calvas (1); 18:12 – Justin Nachbaur (2)
John Lethemon 24 saves / 30 shots		Goalie stats	Jack LaFontaine 31 saves / 32 shots

Kansas City won series 4–2

== Kelly Cup finals ==
=== (S3) Florida Everblades vs. (M1) Kansas City Mavericks ===
May 31	Florida Everblades	8–1	Kansas City Mavericks	Cable Dahmer Arena	Recap
Bobo Carpenter (9) – 3:00; Oliver Chau (4) – 15:55; Cole Moberg (6) – 17:44		First period	6:26 – Jeremy McKenna (9)
Bobo Carpenter (10) – 8:50; Riese Zmolek (2) – 9:28; Oliver Chau (5) – sh – 11:09; Logan Lambdin (4) – 17:55		Second period	No scoring
Riese Zmolek (3) – 6:00		Third period	No scoring
Cam Johnson 34 saves / 35 shots		Goalie stats	Cale Morris 19 saves / 26 shots Jack LaFontaine 9 saves / 10 shots

June 1	Florida Everblades	1–5	Kansas City Mavericks	Cable Dahmer Arena	Recap
Zach Berzolla (1) – 1:30		First period	10:09 – pp – Jeremy McKenna (10)
No scoring		Second period	0:18 – pp – Max Andreev (4); 8:21 – pp – Jacob Hayhurst (4)
No scoring		Third period	18:05 – en – Cole Coskey (5); 19:05 – en – Max Andreev (5)
Cam Johnson 16 saves / 19 shots		Goalie stats	Jack LaFontaine 35 saves / 36 shots

June 5	Kansas City Mavericks	3–6	Florida Everblades	Hertz Arena	Recap
Jacob Hayhurst (5) – 6:02; David Cotton (7) – pp – 14:10; David Cotton (8) – 16:54		First period	12:06 – Logan Lambdin (5)
No scoring		Second period	10:24 – Mark Senden (7)
No scoring		Third period	2:09 – Oliver Chau (6); 10:26 – Logan Lambdin (6); 11:56 – Oliver Chau (7); 18:55 – en – Oliver Chau (8)
Jack LaFontaine 35 saves / 40 shots		Goalie stats	Cam Johnson 16 saves / 19 shots

June 7	Kansas City Mavericks	1–4	Florida Everblades	Hertz Arena	Recap
No scoring		First period	11:25 – sh – Oliver Chau (9)
Justin MacPherson (1) – 6:36		Second period	0:45 – Joe Pendenza (5)
No scoring		Third period	2:56 – Will Reilly (3); 18:35 – en – Bobo Carpenter (11)
Jack LaFontaine 20 saves / 23 shots		Goalie stats	Cam Johnson 17 saves / 18 shots

June 8	Kansas City Mavericks	3–4	OT	Florida Everblades	Hertz Arena	Recap
David Cotton (9) – 19:08		First period		No scoring
Max Andreev (6) – 8:18; Nolan Walker (6) – pp – 16:24		Second period		1:09 – Bobo Carpenter (12)
No scoring		Third period		8:55 – sh – Mark Senden (8); 18:12 – Mark Senden (9)
No scoring		First overtime period		3:38 – Matt Wedman (5)
Jack LaFontaine 35 saves / 39 shots		Goalie stats		Cam Johnson 29 saves / 32 shots

Florida won series 4–1

== Statistical leaders ==
=== Skaters ===
These are the top ten skaters based on points

Player	Team	GP	G	A	Pts	+/–	PIM
Bobo Carpenter	Florida Everblades	23	12	11	23	+13	6
Oliver Chau	Florida Everblades	23	9	14	23	+21	4
Jeremy McKenna	Kansas City Mavericks	20	10	11	21	−3	18
Riley Sawchuk	Toledo Walleye	14	10	8	18	−2	8
Josh Ho-Sang	Florida Everblades	22	1	17	18	+7	16
David Cotton	Kansas City Mavericks	19	9	7	16	−2	8
Tristan Ashbrook	Adirondack Thunder	19	8	8	16	+5	8
Brandon Hawkins	Toledo Walleye	14	7	9	16	+5	6
Patrick Curry	Kansas City Mavericks	20	7	9	16	−2	18
Ty Pelton-Byce	Idaho Steelheads	10	5	11	16	+2	6

GP = Games played; G = Goals; A = Assists; Pts = Points; +/– = Plus/minus; PIM = Penalty minutes

=== Goaltending ===
This is a combined of the top five goaltenders based on goals against average and the top five goaltenders based on save percentage, with at least 120 minutes played. The table is sorted by GAA, and the criteria for inclusion are bolded.

Player	Team	GP	W	L	OTL	SA	GA	GAA	SV%	SO	TOI
Brad Arvanitis	Maine Mariners	6	3	3	0	164	10	**1.69**	**0.939**	0	355
Isaac Poulter	Adirondack Thunder	15	7	8	0	444	27	**1.86**	**0.939**	4	871
Cam Johnson	Florida Everblades	23	16	6	1	645	44	**1.88**	**0.932**	3	1401
Matt Vernon	Jacksonville Icemen	7	3	3	1	209	15	**2.10**	**0.928**	2	427
Jack LaFontaine	Kansas City Mavericks	12	7	3	1	418	26	**2.22**	**0.938**	0	702

GP = Games played; W = Wins; L = Losses; OTL = Overtime Losses; SA = Shots against; GA = Goals against; GAA = Goals against average; SV% = Save percentage; SO = Shutouts; TOI = Time on ice (in minutes)
