= Will Reilly (ice hockey) =

- Born: July 23, 1997 (age 29) Toronto, Ontario, Canada
- Height: 6 ft 2 in (188 cm)
- Weight: 216 lb (98 kg; 15 st 6 lb)
- Position: Defenceman
- Shoots: Right
- KHL team Former teams: Spartak Moscow; WBS Penguins; Tucson Roadrunners; Charlotte Checkers; Motor České Budějovice; Shanghai Dragons
- NHL draft: 217th overall, 2017; Pittsburgh Penguins
- Playing career: 2020–present

William Reilly (born July 23, 1997) is a Canadian professional ice hockey defenceman. He is currently playing for HC Spartak Moscow of the Kontinental Hockey League (KHL). He was previously selected by the Pittsburgh Penguins in the 7th round of the 2017 NHL entry draft with the 217th overall pick, the last in the draft.

== Playing career ==
=== Junior ===
Reilly was born in Toronto and played high school hockey at the Upper Canada College, then played one game for the Oakville Blades and a full season for the North York Rangers in the Ontario Junior Hockey League and was named to the 2015 First All-Prospect Team.

He then played one season for the Nanaimo Clippers in the British Columbia Hockey League before committing to play for the Rensselaer Polytechnic Institute Engineers in 2016.

He played four seasons for RPI, scoring 75 (21+54) points in 105 games. He was the team's alternate captain in his junior season and the captain in his senior. He was also named to ECAC Hockey's second all-star team and nominated for the ECAC Hockey Best Defensive Defenseman award.

=== Professional ===
After going undrafted his first two years of eligibility, Reilly was selected by the Pittsburgh Penguins in the 7th round of the 2017 NHL entry draft with the 217th overall pick, the last in the draft, after his first NCAA season.

The Penguins signed him for a two-year, entry-level contract on April 15, 2020. He did not play in the NHL, and recorded 13 (6+7) points in 72 games with the Wilkes-Barre/Scranton Penguins, Pittsburgh's American Hockey League farm club and 6 (2+4) points in 3 games with their ECHL affiliate Wheeling Nailers. At the end of the contract, he did not receive a qualifying offer from the Penguins.

In the 2022-23 season, he played for the Tucson Roadrunners in the American Hockey League (AHL) and scored 5 (1+4) points in 30 games.

For the 2023-24 season, he signed a contract with the Charlotte Checkers in the AHL. He scored no points one game for Charlotte and primarily played with the Florida Everblades in the ECHL, recording 38 (10+28) points in 55 regular season games and 11 (3+8) in 22 playoff games on the team's run to their third consecutive Kelly Cup championship.

For the 2024-25 season, Reilly went overseas for the first time and joined HC Motor České Budějovice in the Czech Extraliga. He recorded 12 (5+7) points in 55 games with the team.

For the 2025-26 season, he joined the Shanghai Dragons in the Kontinental Hockey League on a one-year contract. In his first KHL season, he scored 18 (4+14) games in 64 games.

On July 21, 2026 he signed a two-year contract with HC Spartak Moscow.

== Career statistics ==
			Regular season					Playoffs
Season	Team	League	GP	G	A	Pts	PIM	GP	G	A	Pts	PIM
2013–14	Oakville Blades	OJHL	1	0	0	0	0	—	—	—	—	—
2014–15	North York Rangers	OJHL	47	17	18	35	96	6	0	1	1	8
2015–16	Nanaimo Clippers	BCHL	52	9	23	32	75	14	2	1	3	16
2016–17	RPI	ECAC	35	2	13	15	68	—	—	—	—	—
2017–18	RPI	ECAC	37	7	6	13	24	—	—	—	—	—
2018–19	RPI	ECAC	33	5	13	18	16	—	—	—	—	—
2019–20	RPI	ECAC	34	8	14	22	12	—	—	—	—	—
2020–21	Wilkes-Barre/Scranton Penguins	AHL	26	3	3	6	25	—	—	—	—	—
2021–22	Wilkes-Barre/Scranton Penguins	AHL	40	1	4	5	24	6	2	0	2	0
2021–22	Wheeling Nailers	ECHL	3	2	4	6	2	—	—	—	—	—
2022–23	Tucson Roadrunners	AHL	30	1	4	5	18	—	—	—	—	—
2023–24	Charlotte Checkers	AHL	1	0	0	0	0	—	—	—	—	—
2023–24	Florida Everblades	ECHL	55	10	28	38	34	22	3	8	11	18
2024–25	Motor České Budějovice	Czech	45	5	7	12	67	—	—	—	—	—
2025–26	Shanghai Dragons	KHL	64	4	14	18	45	—	—	—	—	—
KHL totals			64	4	14	18	45	—	—	—	—	—
