= David Cotton (ice hockey) =

American ice hockey player (born 1997)

- Born: July 9, 1997 (age 29) Parker, Texas, USA
- Height: 6 ft 2 in (188 cm)
- Weight: 200 lb (91 kg; 14 st 4 lb)
- Position: Center
- Shoots: Left
- ECHL team Former teams: Kansas City Mavericks; Chicago Wolves; Coachella Valley Firebirds; San Diego Gulls
- NHL draft: 169th overall, 2015; Carolina Hurricanes
- Playing career: 2021–present

David Cotton (born July 9, 1997) is an American professional ice hockey center who is currently playing for the Kansas City Mavericks in the ECHL. He was drafted by the Carolina Hurricanes in the 2015 NHL entry draft and signed with the team in March 2020 alongside his brother Jason.

== Early life ==
Cotton was born on July 9, 1997, in Parker, Texas to parents Peggy and Steve. Following in the footsteps of his two older brothers, Jason and Ryan, Cotton began playing roller hockey at a young age. He often played above his age group to remain on the same team as Jason.

== Playing career ==
=== Amateur ===
Growing up in Parker, Texas, Cotton played junior ice hockey with the Dallas Ice Jets where he won the Kansas City SuperSeries and 2010 Tier II National Championship. Cotton began his high school career playing for the Colorado Thunderbirds in the Tier 1 Elite Hockey League where he attracted attention from scouts from Cushing Academy. He played his freshman season with the Thunderbirds before transferring to Cushing as a sophomore. Upon enrolling at Cushing, Cotton skated for both the school's team and the Boston Junior Bruins U18 team in the MHSL. While playing for the Penguins, Cotton scored 19 goals and 32 assists in 32 games and eight goals and three assists with the Bruins. By the conclusion of his sophomore season, Cotton committed to play NCAA Division I men's ice hockey with the Boston College Eagles men's ice hockey team.

During the offseason prior to the 2014–15 season, Cotton was drafted in the 4th round, 61st overall, by the Dubuque Fighting Saints of the United States Hockey League (USHL). He chose to return to Cushing and endured a breakout season where he recorded 27 goals and 42 assists in 33 games for the Penguins. He helped the team qualify for the Elite 8 tournament where they were swept by Dexter Southfield School. Cotton was subsequently invited to the NHL Prospects Combine where he was measured at 6 ft 2.5 in (1.89 m) and was ranked 62nd overall amongst North American skaters by the NHL Central Scouting Bureau. He was subsequently drafted 169th overall by the Carolina Hurricanes at the 2015 NHL entry draft. During the second day of the draft, Cotton's mother Peggy suffered a Brain Arteriovenous Malformation and was hospitalized for 40 days and required emergency brain surgery. He missed part of the Hurricanes development camp to remain by his mother's bedside.

=== Collegiate ===
Cotton began his freshman season at Boston College with the assistance of the Heffes Family Men's Hockey Scholarship Fund. While enrolled in the Morrissey College of Arts & Sciences, Cotton led all team freshmen in goals, assists, power-play goals, game-winning goals, and points. However, he struggled with the transition to college and found it difficult to maintain good grades while playing DI hockey.

Cotton returned to the Eagles for his junior season where he continued his scoring dominance. On October 13, 2018, Cotton recorded his first collegiate hat-trick during a 7–5 loss to the Wisconsin Badgers men's ice hockey team. He concluded the season with a career-high 21 goals and ranked seventh nationally in goals per game. As a result, he was selected for the First Team Hockey East All-Star, Second Team All-American, and New England Division I All-Star Team. During the offseason, Cotton did not seek a contract offer from Carolina but attended their 2019 Development Camp.

When he returned to college for his senior year and his first as team captain, Cotton played in 32 games and ranked third on the team in scoring with a career-high 39 points. He ranked third in the conference with 13 multi-point games including a multi-goal effort in the Beanpot Semifinal against Boston University. He was subsequently nominated for the Hobey Baker Award and named the male winner of the 2020 Eagle of the Year Award.

=== Professional ===
On March 24, 2020, Cotton concluded his collegiate career and signed with the Carolina Hurricanes to an entry-level contract alongside his brother. His two-year, two-way contract was worth $700,000 in 2020-21 and $832,500 in 2021–22 at the NHL level and $70,000 at the American Hockey League (AHL) level. When the AHL resumed play in 2021, Cotton and Jason were reassigned to the Chicago Wolves and eventually became the second set of brothers to play in the same game for the Wolves.

As a free agent following his entry-level contract with the Hurricanes, Cotton was later signed approaching the 2022–23 season, to a one-year AHL contract for the inaugural season of the Coachella Valley Firebirds on September 22, 2022. Cotton made just two appearances with the Firebirds over the opening quarter of the season before he was traded by Coachella to the San Diego Gulls in exchange for future considerations on December 8, 2022.

As a free agent from the Gulls, Cotton was unable to secure an AHL contract, opting to sign a deal with the Florida Everblades of the ECHL on August 29, 2023. In the 2023–24 season, Cotton registered just 2 assists through the opening 7 games with the Everblades, before he was traded to the Kansas City Mavericks on November 26, 2023.

== Career statistics ==
			Regular season					Playoffs
Season	Team	League	GP	G	A	Pts	PIM	GP	G	A	Pts	PIM
2013–14	Cushing Academy	USHS	32	19	32	51	—	—	—	—	—	—
2014–15	Cushing Academy	USHS	33	27	42	69	—	—	—	—	—	—
2015–16	Waterloo Black Hawks	USHL	48	15	15	30	34	9	0	2	2	8
2016–17	Boston College	HE	40	10	14	24	16	—	—	—	—	—
2017–18	Boston College	HE	37	9	19	28	22	—	—	—	—	—
2018–19	Boston College	HE	39	23	13	36	20	—	—	—	—	—
2019–20	Boston College	HE	32	15	24	39	46	—	—	—	—	—
2020–21	Chicago Wolves	AHL	26	14	7	21	18	—	—	—	—	—
2021–22	Chicago Wolves	AHL	55	7	9	16	21	—	—	—	—	—
2022–23	Coachella Valley Firebirds	AHL	2	0	0	0	0	—	—	—	—	—
2022–23	San Diego Gulls	AHL	34	4	5	9	8	—	—	—	—	—
2023–24	Florida Everblades	ECHL	7	0	2	2	2	—	—	—	—	—
AHL totals			117	25	21	46	47	—	—	—	—	—

== Awards and honors ==
Award	Year
USHS
All-USA Hockey First Team	2015
College
HE First All-Star Team	2019
East Second All-American Team	2019
HE Third All-Star Team	2020
AHL
Calder Cup (Chicago Wolves)	2022
