= Shane Harper (ice hockey) =

American ice hockey player (born 1989)

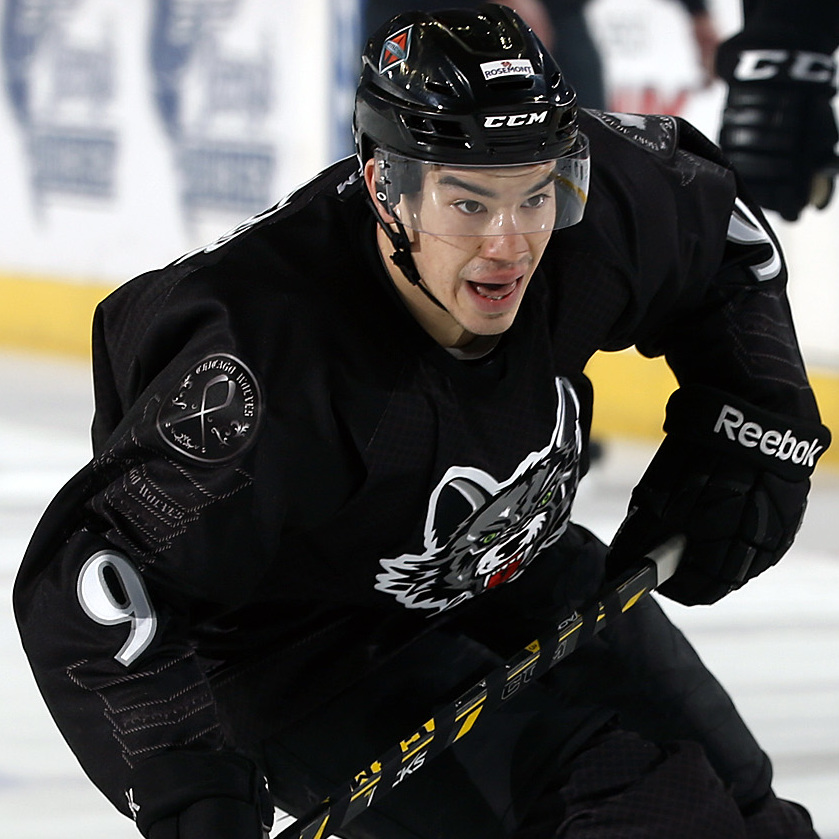
- Harper with the Chicago Wolves in 2015
- Born: February 1, 1989 (age 37) Valencia, California, U.S.
- Height: 5 ft 11 in (180 cm)
- Weight: 194 lb (88 kg; 13 st 12 lb)
- Position: Left wing
- Shoots: Right
- ECHL team Former teams: Adirondack Thunder; Florida Panthers; Lada Togliatti; Örebro HK; Brynäs IF
- NHL draft: Undrafted
- Playing career: 2010–present

Shane Harper (born February 1, 1989) is an American professional ice hockey player who plays with the Adirondack Thunder of the ECHL.

== Early life ==
Shane Harper grew up playing hockey in the greater Los Angeles area. As a youth, he played in the 2002 Quebec International Pee-Wee Hockey Tournament with the Anaheim Junior Ducks minor ice hockey team.

Prior to turning professional, Harper played major junior hockey in the Western Hockey League with the Everett Silvertips where he was named to the Western Conference Second All-Star Team for his outstanding play during the 2009–10 WHL season.

== Playing career ==
On March 4, 2010, the Philadelphia Flyers signed Harper to a three-year, entry-level contract.

On June 12, 2013, he was traded from the Flyers to the New York Islanders, along with a 2014 4th-round draft pick, for the rights to defenseman Mark Streit.

Harper was not tendered a new contract with the Islanders and on September 9, 2013, he was signed as a free agent to a one-year contract with the Chicago Wolves of the AHL. In the 2014–15 season with the Wolves, Harper placed third in the League with 32 goals, for 50 points in 75 games.

On July 1, 2015, Harper secured an NHL contract, signing a one-year, two-way contract as a free agent with the Florida Panthers.

Coming out of training camp in 2016, Harper made the Panthers initial 23-man roster. Harper made his NHL debut in a season opener against the New Jersey Devils. On October 22, 2016, Harper scored his first goal in the NHL and later would add another, a game-winner for the Panthers, against the Colorado Avalanche. Having appeared in 14 games with the Panthers for 3 points, Harper was reassigned to new AHL affiliate, the Springfield Thunderbirds. He collected 19 points in 39 games before on March 1, 2017, he was traded by the Panthers to the New Jersey Devils in exchange for Reece Scarlett.

As a free agent from the Devils, Harper was unable to earn another NHL contract over the summer. On October 2, 2017, he signed his first contract abroad, agreeing to a one-year deal with HC Lada Togliatti of the Kontinental Hockey League (KHL). In 36 games over the 2017–18 season, Harper contributed with four goals and 11 points in a checking-line role.

In the off-season, Harper left Russia, agreeing to a two-year contract with Swedish club, Örebro HK of the Swedish Hockey League (SHL), on June 21, 2018.

Following three seasons in the SHL, Harper returned to North America as a free agent, agreeing to a one-year ECHL contract with the Adirondack Thunder on July 9, 2021. As an alternate captain with the Thunder, Harper posted 22 goals and 52 points in 48 regular season games. At the conclusion of the regular season with Adirondack, Harper was signed to a professional try-out contract with AHL affiliate, the Utica Comets, on April 29, 2022, playing two games for them. The following season, he returned to Adirondack, this time as captain and set the club record with 75 points in 65 games. After taking the 2024-25 season off, Harper once again returned to Adirondack late in the 2025-26 season.

== Personal life ==
He is the brother of model-actress Christen Harper who is married to Jared Goff of the Detroit Lions.

== Career statistics ==
| | | | Regular season | | | | | Playoffs |
| Season | Team | League | GP | G | A | Pts | PIM | GP | G | A | Pts | PIM |
|---|---|---|---|---|---|---|---|---|---|---|---|---|
| 2005–06 | Everett Silvertips | WHL | 62 | 6 | 4 | 10 | 8 | 5 | 1 | 0 | 1 | 0 |
| 2006–07 | Everett Silvertips | WHL | 58 | 3 | 12 | 15 | 23 | 8 | 1 | 2 | 3 | 0 |
| 2007–08 | Everett Silvertips | WHL | 71 | 17 | 26 | 43 | 18 | 4 | 0 | 2 | 2 | 0 |
| 2008–09 | Everett Silvertips | WHL | 72 | 32 | 34 | 66 | 10 | 5 | 0 | 4 | 4 | 0 |
| 2009–10 | Everett Silvertips | WHL | 72 | 42 | 38 | 80 | 38 | 7 | 6 | 4 | 10 | 6 |
| 2009–10 | Adirondack Phantoms | AHL | 5 | 1 | 0 | 1 | 2 | — | — | — | — | — |
| 2010–11 | Greenville Road Warriors | ECHL | 48 | 22 | 23 | 45 | 20 | 11 | 4 | 6 | 10 | 2 |
| 2010–11 | Adirondack Phantoms | AHL | 20 | 1 | 2 | 3 | 4 | — | — | — | — | — |
| 2011–12 | Adirondack Phantoms | AHL | 70 | 13 | 14 | 27 | 43 | — | — | — | — | — |
| 2012–13 | Trenton Titans | ECHL | 15 | 14 | 13 | 27 | 2 | — | — | — | — | — |
| 2012–13 | Adirondack Phantoms | AHL | 48 | 5 | 5 | 10 | 35 | — | — | — | — | — |
| 2013–14 | Chicago Wolves | AHL | 63 | 13 | 20 | 33 | 8 | 9 | 2 | 3 | 5 | 0 |
| 2014–15 | Chicago Wolves | AHL | 75 | 32 | 18 | 50 | 14 | 5 | 0 | 4 | 4 | 4 |
| 2015–16 | Portland Pirates | AHL | 59 | 12 | 25 | 37 | 18 | 5 | 2 | 0 | 2 | 0 |
| 2016–17 | Florida Panthers | NHL | 14 | 2 | 1 | 3 | 18 | — | — | — | — | — |
| 2016–17 | Springfield Thunderbirds | AHL | 39 | 7 | 12 | 19 | 6 | — | — | — | — | — |
| 2016–17 | Albany Devils | AHL | 19 | 1 | 2 | 3 | 2 | — | — | — | — | — |
| 2017–18 | HC Lada Togliatti | KHL | 36 | 4 | 7 | 11 | 13 | — | — | — | — | — |
| 2018–19 | Örebro HK | SHL | 52 | 9 | 19 | 28 | 14 | 2 | 1 | 0 | 1 | 0 |
| 2019–20 | Örebro HK | SHL | 50 | 15 | 14 | 29 | 8 | — | — | — | — | — |
| 2020–21 | Brynäs IF | SHL | 26 | 5 | 8 | 13 | 35 | — | — | — | — | — |
| 2021–22 | Adirondack Thunder | ECHL | 48 | 22 | 30 | 52 | 18 | — | — | — | — | — |
| 2021–22 | Utica Comets | AHL | 2 | 0 | 0 | 0 | 4 | — | — | — | — | — |
| 2022–23 | Adirondack Thunder | ECHL | 65 | 22 | 53 | 75 | 20 | 5 | 1 | 3 | 4 | 2 |
| 2023 | Team Bourque | 3ICE | 8 | 8 | 4 | 12 | — | — | — | — | — | — |
| 2023–24 | Adirondack Thunder | ECHL | 56 | 19 | 37 | 56 | 24 | 18 | 6 | 9 | 15 | 2 |
| 2025–26 | Adirondack Thunder | ECHL | 3 | 1 | 1 | 2 | 12 | — | — | — | — | — |
| NHL totals | | | 14 | 2 | 1 | 3 | 18 | — | — | — | — | — |
| KHL totals | | | 36 | 4 | 7 | 11 | 13 | — | — | — | — | — |
| SHL totals | | | 128 | 29 | 41 | 70 | 57 | 2 | 1 | 0 | 1 | 0 |

== Awards and honors ==
| Award | Year |
|---|---|
WHL
| Second all-star team | 2009–10 |
