= Isaac Poulter =

Canadian ice hockey goaltender (born 2001)

- Born: September 12, 2001 (age 24) Winnipeg, Manitoba, Canada
- Height: 6 ft 2 in (188 cm)
- Weight: 174 lb (79 kg; 12 st 6 lb)
- Position: Goaltender
- Catches: Left
- NHL team (P) Cur. team: Winnipeg Jets; Manitoba Moose (AHL)
- NHL draft: Undrafted
- Playing career: 2022–present

Isaac Poulter (born September 12, 2001) is a Canadian professional ice hockey player who is a goaltender for the Manitoba Moose of the American Hockey League (AHL) as a prospect to the Winnipeg Jets of the National Hockey League (NHL).

== Playing career ==
Poulter was selected 112th overall in the 2016 Western Hockey League (WHL) Prospects Draft by the Swift Current Broncos. Although he considered playing college ice hockey, Poulter signed with the Broncos in October 2017. His WHL debut came on September 29, 2018, a 5–2 loss against the Red Deer Rebels. Poulter played four seasons with the Broncos, winning the team award for Humanitarian of the Year in the latter three.

On June 22, 2022, Poulter turned professional and signed a one-year, two-way contract with the Utica Comets of the American Hockey League (AHL). He split the 2022–23 season between the Comets and their ECHL affiliate, the Adirondack Thunder.

The Comets renewed Poulter's contract for the 2023–24 season, signing him to a one-year deal. On February 15, 2024, he signed a two-year, entry-level contract with the New Jersey Devils, the NHL affiliate of the Comets. On May 8, 2024, during the second round of the 2024 Kelly Cup playoffs, Poulter set a franchise record for saves in a playoff game with 54 saves in a 2–1 overtime victory over the Norfolk Admirals.

As a free agent at the conclusion of his contract with the Devils, Poulter joined the Winnipeg Jets, signing a one-year, two-way contract for the 2025–26 season on July 2, 2025.

== Personal life ==
Poulter's parents were both goaltenders, and his great-great-uncle, Hockey Hall of Fame inductee Charlie Gardiner, won the Vezina Trophy in 1932 and 1934 as the NHL's best goaltender.

Poulter grew up supporting the Chicago Blackhawks, and later the Winnipeg Jets following their relocation from Atlanta in 2011.

== Career statistics ==
			Regular season									Playoffs
Season	Team	League	GP	W	L	T/OT	MIN	GA	SO	GAA	SV%	GP	W	L	MIN	GA	SO	GAA	SV%
2018–19	Swift Current Broncos	WHL	25	3	12	1	1,456	103	1	4.25	.891	—	—	—	—	—	—	—	—
2019–20	Swift Current Broncos	WHL	47	9	32	4	2,745	186	0	4.06	.896	—	—	—	—	—	—	—	—
2020–21	Swift Current Broncos	WHL	16	3	12	1	953	70	0	4.41	.879	—	—	—	—	—	—	—	—
2020–21	Whitecourt Wolverines	AJHL	2	1	0	1	124	5	0	2.41	.939	—	—	—	—	—	—	—	—
2021–22	Swift Current Broncos	WHL	49	20	23	6	2,822	141	5	3.00	.911	—	—	—	—	—	—	—	—
2022–23	Utica Comets	AHL	13	7	3	3	762	46	0	3.62	.883	—	—	—	—	—	—	—	—
2022–23	Adirondack Thunder	ECHL	22	10	8	2	1,269	62	1	2.93	.910	—	—	—	—	—	—	—	—
2023–24	Utica Comets	AHL	28	17	8	1	1,554	66	4	2.55	.911	—	—	—	—	—	—	—	—
2023–24	Adirondack Thunder	ECHL	6	5	0	0	369	15	0	2.44	.917	15	7	8	871	27	4	1.86	.939
2024–25	Utica Comets	AHL	36	16	13	6	2,079	99	1	2.86	.898	—	—	—	—	—	—	—	—
AHL totals			77	40	24	10	4,396	211	5	2.88	.900	—	—	—	—	—	—	—	—

== Awards and honours ==
Award	Year	Ref
WHL
Central Division Second All-Star Team	2022	
