= Mathieu Roy =

Mathieu Roy may refer to:

- Mathieu Roy (ice hockey, born 1983), Canadian ice hockey defenceman
- Mathieu Roy (ice hockey, born 1986), Canadian ice hockey winger
