= Riley Sawchuk =

Canadian ice hockey player (born 1999)

- Born: March 18, 1999 (age 27) Prince Albert, Saskatchewan, Canada
- Height: 5 ft 11 in (180 cm)
- Weight: 181 lb (82 kg; 12 st 13 lb)
- Position: Centre
- Shoots: Right
- KHL team Former teams: CSKA Moscow; Lada Togliatti; Grand Rapids Griffins; KooKoo
- NHL draft: Undrafted
- Playing career: 2023–present

Riley Sawchuk (born March 18, 1999) is a Canadian professional ice hockey centre. He is currently playing for HC CSKA Moscow of the Kontinental Hockey League (KHL).

== Playing career ==
=== Junior ===
Riley Sawchuk began his junior career in his hometown of Prince Albert, Saskatchewan. He was drafted in the 6th round (115th overall) in the 2014 WHL draft by the Tri-City Americans. Sawchuk played for the Prince Albert Mintos in the Saskatchewan Male U18 AAA Hockey League and represented Saskatchewan for the 2015 Canada Winter Games before debuting for the Americans in the 2015–16 season. He scored his first goal in the WHL on January 6, 2017, visiting his hometown Prince Albert Raiders. Sawchuk played three more full seasons for Tri-City before being traded to the Edmonton Oil Kings in exchange for a 2021 third-round pick.

In the 2019–20 season, his final in the WHL, Sawchuk was the top scorer of the Oil Kings with 76 (25+51) points in 64 games and was selected to the second All-Star team of the WHL's Eastern Conference.

After playing in the WHL, Sawchuk committed to Mount Royal University. As the 2020-21 USports season was cancelled, he debuted for the Mount Royal Cougars in the 2021–22 season, leading the Canada West conference in assists and winning the University of Alberta Hockey Alumni Trophy, its Rookie of the Year honor. He was also named to the USports All-Canadian Second Team and All-Rookie Team, and was called to the USports All-Star team for Canada's National Junior Team Selection camp and to the Seattle Kraken development camp. Next season, he led the conference in points as well as assists, and was named Canada West's Player of the Year as well as a member of the USports All-Canadian First Team.

=== Professional ===
After the end of his season with the Mount Royal Cougars, Sawchuk signed a professional tryout contract for the rest of the 2022–23 AHL season and a standard player contract for the 2023–24 AHL season with the Grand Rapids Griffins of the American Hockey League. His professional debut was on February 24, 2023, against the Chicago Wolves, and on March 3 he scored his first goal in the AHL against the Iowa Wild.

Before the 2023–24 season, Sawchuk attended the training camp of the Detroit Red Wings and played in the 2023 NHL Prospects Tournament. During the season, he played for the Grand Rapids Griffins in the AHL as well as their ECHL affiliate Toledo Walleye, contributing to the Walleye's run to the Western Conference Final of the 2024 Kelly Cup playoffs with the team's highest 18 (10+8) points in 14 playoff games.

For the 2024–25 season, Sawchuk signed a 1+1 contract with KooKoo in the Liiga. Sawchuk scored 32 (15+17) points in 55 regular season games and no points in 4 playoff games, and after a first-round elimination by Vaasan Sport he left the team.

For the 2025–26 season, Sawchuk signed a one-year contract with a Russian club Lada Togliatti in the Kontinental Hockey League with the salary of 30 million rubles a year. Before the season, he was named the team's alternate captain. During the season, he beat Lada's scoring records for goals and points with 45 (23+22) and was selected for the 2026 KHL All-Star Game. Before the 2025-26 KHL season, he signed a one-year extension with Lada, with a salary of 40 million and a performance bonus of 5 million rubles.

On October 12, 2026, Sawchuk was traded to HC CSKA Moscow in exchange for financial compensation, which was reported to be 50 million rubles.

== Personal life ==
Sawchuk's grandfather was the cousin of the Hall of Fame goaltender Terry Sawchuk.

== Career statistics ==
			Regular season					Playoffs
Season	Team	League	GP	G	A	Pts	PIM	GP	G	A	Pts	PIM
2015–16	Tri-City Americans	WHL	3	0	0	0	0	—	—	—	—	—
2016–17	Tri-City Americans	WHL	55	2	5	7	13	4	0	0	0	0
2017–18	Tri-City Americans	WHL	70	15	9	24	31	14	2	3	5	6
2018–19	Tri-City Americans	WHL	67	20	33	53	34	5	0	0	0	2
2019–20	Edmonton Oil Kings	WHL	64	25	51	76	23	—	—	—	—	—
2021–22	Mount Royal Cougars	CWUAA	20	15	23	38	8	5	1	1	2	0
2022–23	Mount Royal Cougars	CWUAA	27	20	29	49	24	3	3	1	4	4
2022–23	Grand Rapids Griffins	AHL	23	3	0	3	4	—	—	—	—	—
2023–24	Grand Rapids Griffins	AHL	12	1	0	1	4	—	—	—	—	—
2023–24	Toledo Walleye	ECHL	50	25	27	52	24	14	10	8	18	8
2024–25	KooKoo	Liiga	55	15	17	32	66	4	0	0	0	2
2025–26	Lada Togliatti	KHL	68	23	22	45	10	—	—	—	—	—
Liiga totals			55	15	17	32	66	4	0	0	0	2
KHL totals			68	23	22	45	10	—	—	—	—	—
