= 2013 Kelly Cup playoffs =

Tournament details
- Teams: 16

Final positions
- Champions: Reading Royals
- Runner-up: Stockton Thunder

The 2013 Kelly Cup Playoffs of the ECHL started on April 5, 2013, following the end of the 2012–13 ECHL regular season. The playoff format changed from that of the 2012 postseason; 16 teams qualified for the playoffs, the top eight teams from both the Western Conference and the Eastern Conference. First-round series were scheduled as best-of-seven, where in prior years they were best-of-five.

== Playoff seeds ==
After the regular season, 16 teams qualified for the playoffs. The Alaska Aces were the Western Conference regular season champions and the Brabham Cup winners with the best record and 106 points, making them the first team in league history to win the Brabham Cup in three consecutive seasons. The Reading Royals earned the top seed in the Eastern Conference and finished the season with 99 points.

=== Eastern Conference ===
1. Reading Royals - Atlantic Division and Eastern Conference champions, 99 points.
2. Cincinnati Cyclones - North Division champions, 92 points.
3. Gwinnett Gladiators - South Division champions, 89 points.
4. Florida Everblades - 89 points.
5. Elmira Jackals - 87 points.
6. South Carolina Stingrays - 84 points.
7. Toledo Walleye - 83 points.
8. Greenville Road Warriors - 80 points.

=== Western Conference ===
1. Alaska Aces - Western Conference and Mountain Division champions, Brabham Cup winner, 106 points.
2. Ontario Reign - Pacific Division champions, 99 points.
3. Idaho Steelheads - 97 points.
4. Stockton Thunder - 83 points.
5. Las Vegas Wranglers - 79 points.
6. Colorado Eagles - 75 points.
7. Utah Grizzlies - 71 points.
8. San Francisco Bulls - 59 points.

== Playoff bracket ==
Conference quarterfinals	Conference semifinals
1	Reading	4
8	Greenville	2
1	Reading	4
4	Florida	3
4	Florida	4
5	Elmira	2
Eastern Conference
2	Cincinnati	4
7	Toledo	2
2	Cincinnati	4
3	Gwinnett	2
3	Gwinnett Gladiators	4
6	South Carolina	0
1	Alaska	4
8	San Francisco	1
1	Alaska	2
4	Stockton	4
4	Stockton	4
5	Las Vegas	3
Western Conference
2	Ontario	4
7	Utah	0
2	Ontario	2
3	Idaho	4
3	Idaho	4
6	Colorado	2

Conference finals
1	Reading	4
2	Cincinnati	1
4	Stockton	4
3	Idaho	1

Kelly Cup finals
1	Reading	4
4	Stockton	1

== See also ==
- 2012–13 ECHL season
- List of ECHL seasons

Preceded by 2012 Kelly Cup playoffs	Kelly Cup Playoffs; 2013	Succeeded by 2014 Kelly Cup playoffs
