= Jason Cotton =

American ice hockey player

- Born: February 7, 1995 (age 31) Parker, Texas, USA
- Height: 6 ft 3 in (191 cm)
- Weight: 190 lb (86 kg; 13 st 8 lb)
- Position: Center
- Shot: Right
- Played for: Chicago Wolves
- NHL draft: Undrafted
- Playing career: 2020–2021

Jason Cotton (born February 7, 1995) is an American former professional ice hockey center who played in the American Hockey League (AHL) with the Chicago Wolves.

== Early life ==
Cotton was born on February 7, 1995, in Parker, Texas to parents Peggy and Steve. He grew up the middle of three siblings and played hockey with his younger brother David.

== Playing career ==
=== Amateur ===
Cotton finished the 2011–12 season with 39 points in 40 games for the Thunderbirds U16 team and planned on joining the Tri-City Storm the following season. On July 12, 2012, Cotton announced his commitment to play NCAA Division I college ice hockey with the Northeastern Huskies men's ice hockey team. After playing one season with the Storm, recording six points in 45 games, his playing rights were acquired by the West Kelowna Warriors in the British Columbia Hockey League (BCHL). He made his BCHL debut on September 20 where he scored two goals in a 5–3 win over the Salmon Arm Silverbacks. As a result of his play with the Warriors, Cotton was ranked 162nd overall amongst North American skaters by the NHL Central Scouting Bureau prior to the 2014 NHL entry draft. After going undrafted, he returned to the Warriors for the 2014-15 season, recording 27 goals in 58 games.

=== Collegiate ===
Cotton spent his freshman season playing with the Northeastern Huskies men's ice hockey before withdrawing from the school after playing in eight games. He chose to forgo the remainder of his freshman year and played with the Youngstown Phantoms for the season. He returned to college for his sophomore year but was forced to redshirting for the 2016–17 season before joining the Sacred Heart Pioneers men's ice hockey team.

In his senior season, Cotton amassed a career-high 20 goals and 17 assists for 37 points and tied for fourth in point scoring in the conference. During the year, he also recorded three power play goals, three shorthanded goals, three game-winning goals and a hat-trick. As a result of his play, Cotton was a finalist for the Hobey Baker Award and selected for the Second Team All-American.

=== Professional ===
On March 24, 2020, Cotton concluded his collegiate career and was signed by the Carolina Hurricanes to an entry-level contract alongside his brother. His one-year, two-way contract was worth $700,000 at the NHL level and $50,000 at the American Hockey League (AHL) level. When the AHL resumed play in 2021, Cotton and David were reassigned to the Chicago Wolves and eventually became the second set of brothers to play in the same game for the Wolves.

After just 1 game with the Wolves in the 2020–21 season, Cotton was re-assigned by the Hurricanes to the Fort Wayne Komets of the ECHL. He registered 4 goals and 6 points through 17 games before opting to conclude his professional hockey career, and mutually terminating his contract with the Hurricanes on April 7, 2021.

== Career statistics ==
=== Regular season and playoffs ===
			Regular season					Playoffs
Season	Team	League	GP	G	A	Pts	PIM	GP	G	A	Pts	PIM
2012–13	Tri-City Storm	USHL	45	1	5	6	8	—	—	—	—	—
2013–14	West Kelowna Warriors	BCHL	50	23	36	59	14	3	0	1	1	0
2014–15	West Kelowna Warriors	BCHL	58	27	31	58	28	5	1	1	2	0
2015–16	Northeastern University	HE	8	0	0	0	2	—	—	—	—	—
2015–16	Youngstown Phantoms	USHL	28	6	5	11	4	—	—	—	—	—
2017–18	Sacred Heart University	AHA	39	12	9	21	8	—	—	—	—	—
2018–19	Sacred Heart University	AHA	37	9	14	23	6	—	—	—	—	—
2019–20	Sacred Heart University	AHA	34	20	17	37	14	—	—	—	—	—
2020–21	Chicago Wolves	AHL	1	0	0	0	0	—	—	—	—	—
2020–21	Fort Wayne Komets	ECHL	17	4	2	6	2	—	—	—	—	—
NCAA totals			118	41	40	81	30	—	—	—	—	—

=== International ===
Year	Team	Event	Result	GP	G	A	Pts	PIM
2012	United States	IH18	7th	4	0	0	0	0
Junior totals				4	0	0	0	0

== Awards and honors ==
Award	Year
USHL
USHL/NHL Top Prospects Game	2013
College
AHA First All-Star Team	2020
AHA Player of the Year	2020
East Second All-American Team	2020
New England D1 All-Stars	2020
New England Hines Award	2020
Hobey Baker Finalist	2020
