= Julian Junca =

French-Spanish ice hockey player

- Born: 15 February 1998 (age 28) Prades, France
- Height: 195 cm (6 ft 5 in)
- Weight: 92 kg (203 lb; 14 st 7 lb)
- Position: Goaltender
- Shoots: Left
- Slovak team Former teams: HC Slovan Bratislava; Chicago Wolves; Tulsa Oilers; Rapaces de Gap; HK Dukla Trenčín; HK Dukla Michalovce
- National team: France
- NHL draft: Undrafted
- Playing career: 2015–present

Julian Junca (born 15 February 1998) is a French–Spanish professional ice hockey player who is a goaltender for HC Slovan Bratislava of the Slovak Extraliga. Junca was selected to play for the French national team at the 2026 Winter Olympics.

In 2023, Junca won the Jean Ferrand Trophy, awarded to the best goaltender in the Ligue Magnus. The following season, Junca signed with the Tulsa Oilers of the ECHL and began playing hockey in the United States.
