= Greenville Swamp Rabbits =

Minor professional ice hockey team

- City: Greenville, South Carolina
- League: ECHL
- Conference: Eastern
- Division: South
- Founded: 1987 (In the AAHL)
- Home arena: Bon Secours Wellness Arena
- Colors: Navy blue, orange, gold, silver, white
- Owner: Spire Hockey South
- General manager: Chad Costello
- Head coach: Chad Costello
- Affiliates: Los Angeles Kings (NHL); Ontario Reign (AHL)
- Website: swamprabbits.com

Franchise history
- 1987–2010: Johnstown Chiefs
- 2010–2015: Greenville Road Warriors
- 2015–present: Greenville Swamp Rabbits

Championships
- Division titles: 2 (2010–11, 2023–24)

The Greenville Swamp Rabbits are a professional ice hockey team located in Greenville, South Carolina. They play in the South Division of the ECHL's Eastern Conference and play their home games at the Bon Secours Wellness Arena in downtown Greenville. The franchise had previously played as the Johnstown Chiefs from the ECHL's inception in 1988 until the team's relocation in 2010 and subsequently as the Greenville Road Warriors until being re-branded as the Swamp Rabbits in 2015. The Swamp Rabbits are the second ECHL franchise to play in Greenville, as the city hosted the Greenville Grrrowl from 1998 until 2006.

== Team history ==
=== Greenville Road Warriors (2010–2015) ===
The franchise was founded as the Johnstown Chiefs prior to the 1987–88 All-American Hockey League season. The next season, the franchise became one of the founding members of the East Coast Hockey League, which would be rebranded as the ECHL in 2003. The Chiefs would flounder for several years as the owners of the team tried to find new local ownership, but failed. After losing a reported $100,000 per year and facing an expensive rent posted by their arena's new owners, the Chiefs began taking offers to relocate the team. On February 13, 2010, the Tribune-Democrat newspaper began reporting that parties in Greenville, South Carolina, were in negotiations with Chiefs' owner Neil Smith about relocating the team for the 2009–10 season out of the BI-LO Center.

Road Warriors Logo

Two days later, it was confirmed previous reports that the Chiefs would relocate, pending approval by Greenville's arena board and the ECHL's board of governors. On February 15, the Greenville Arena District Board announced that they had agreed to a five-year deal to bring the Chiefs to the Bi-Lo Center. Cincinnati Cyclones assistant coach Dean Stork was named the team's first head coach on June 29.

The Greenville Road Warriors' inaugural season was successful and they became the second first-year team in the ECHL to win a regular-season conference title with 46–22–4 record. Led by rookie head coach Dean Stork, the Road Warriors had nine players with at least 40 points during the regular season and a defense that gave up the second-fewest goals in the league (192). The 2011 Kelly Cup playoffs began with the top-seeded Road Warriors taking on the eighth-place Elmira Jackals. A split of the first two games in Elmira left the series tied and headed back to Greenville. The Road Warriors took the next two games, a 2–0 win in game three and an overtime win in game four, to move on to the second round. The Road Warriors then took on the Wheeling Nailers, splitting the first two games at the BI-LO Center. The Nailers then went up 3–1 in the series with wins in games three and four in Wheeling. Greenville responded by winning game five (5–1) and game six (6–3) to force a game seven at the BI-LO Center. Greenville never led during regulation, but Brendan Connolly scored the game tying goal with 23 seconds left in the third period to force overtime. The Road Warriors comeback fell short when Wheeling converted a 2-on-1 just over eight minutes into overtime and ended Greenville's season.

The Road Warriors' second season in the ECHL saw the team finish second in the South Division, fourth in the Eastern Conference, with a 41–25–6 record. The team posted the sixth-most goals (232, 3.22 per game). Justin Bowers finished third in the league with 78 points and was second with 59 assists while Brandon Wong (31, 6th) and Marc-Olivier Vallerand (30, 7th) finished in the top ten in the league in goals. On the defensive side, rookie goalie, and New York Rangers prospect, Jason Missiaen was 12–5–2 over a span where he played of 18 of 19 games, finishing the season with 22 wins.

In the playoffs, Greenville took on the fifth-seeded Florida Everblades in a best-of-five Eastern Conference quarterfinal series. Florida had won eight of its final 10 games of the regular season and the Road Warriors lost the first two games in Florida by scores of 5–2 and 4–2 before returning home for game three. It would be the final game of the season as Florida notched a 3–2 win and completed the sweep.

==== Road Warriors under new ownership ====
During the 2012 playoffs, the Road Warriors' owners, Neil Smith and Steve Posner, sold the franchise to a local ownership group led by Fred Festa and his Chestnut Street Sports LLC.

The 2012–13 season was one of many milestones for the Road Warriors, both individual and as a team. Head coach Dean Stork getting his 100th victory behind the Greenville and captain T.J. Reynolds played in his 600th professional game. The Road Warriors also saw a 9% rise in attendance over the previous season. On three occasions, the team had record crowds larger than any from the previous two seasons with largest of 7,529 on March 2, 2013. In the first half of the season, Gwinnett and Greenville traded the first-place position in the South Division. However, after going 26–14–4 in the first half of the season the team struggled during the second half and went 10–13–4. Greenville fell to the bottom of the Eastern Conference and clinched the eighth playoff seed with 80 points in the regular season.

The Road Warriors' opponent in the best-of-seven series, the Reading Royals, collected 99 points for the first seed in the Eastern Conference. Greenville was shutout in games one and two in Reading. Back on home ice, Greenville was finally scored in game three and a 4–2 victory. The Road Warriors then lost the next two games and Reading collected two more shutouts in games four and five to win the series 4-games-to-1. Reading would go on to win the Kelly Cup, making 2012–13 the second straight season the Road Warriors would be eliminated by the eventual league champions.

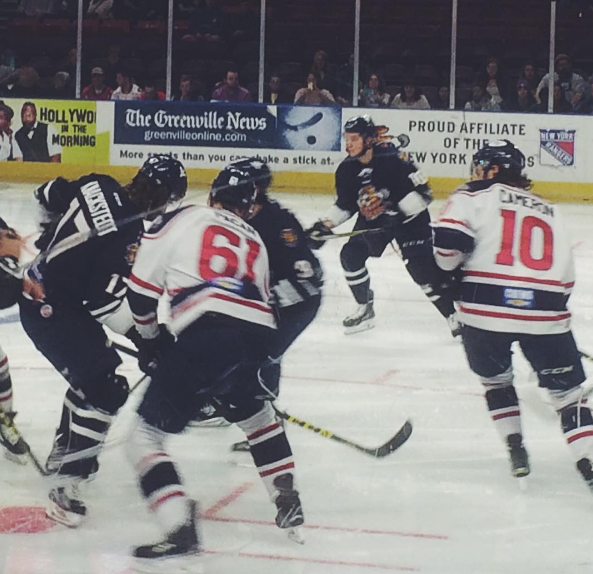
Greenville Swamp Rabbits (in navy) vs. South Carolina Stingrays in February 2016.

The 2013–14 season saw the Road Warriors reach the Eastern Conference Finals for the first time in their four-year history. The beginning of the season got off to the worst start in team history. Aside from the first few weeks of the season, the team did not peak over a .500 winning percentage until the second weekend in January. The Road Warriors then earned a three-game weekend sweep of the Evansville IceMen. From February 8 through March 28, the Road Warriors earned a 16–4–0 record, putting them in playoff contention. This push helped the team clinch the sixth playoff seed with a 39–27–2–4 record and fourth consecutive playoff appearance under Dean Stork.

The Road Warriors drew the Kalamazoo Wings in the first round of the playoffs. The series began with the teams splitting games and was evened at two games apiece to even the series going into game five. On April 26, the Road Warriors played the longest game to date in a three overtime battle against the Wings. Kyle Jean scored the winning goal in a game that lasted 4 hours and 21 minutes. The Road Warriors won game six to move on to the second round for the first time in two years. The Wheeling Nailers were the next opponent in the 2014 Kelly Cup playoffs. The Road Warriors began the series winning two games on the road. The Nailers battled back to even the series. While in front of home fans, the Road Warriors won game five by a score of 4–1 and three nights later, shutout the Nailers 4–0 in game six to advance to the Eastern Conference Finals against the Cincinnati Cyclones. The two games again split the first four games, but the Cyclones won games five and six to end the Road Warriors hopes at a championship.

After a less successful 2014–15 season that saw the team finish with a 39–29–1–3 record and miss the playoffs for the first time since relocating to Greenville, head coach Dean Stork was released.

=== Greenville Swamp Rabbits (2015–present) ===
On August 26, 2015, the team announced that it had officially rebranded itself as the Greenville Swamp Rabbits. The team was renamed to the Swamp Rabbits to strengthen the team's ties to Greenville. The name Swamp Rabbits was a local name of the Greenville and Northern Railway that began operations in 1920. In 2005 the railroad was abandoned and was converted to the Swamp Rabbit Trail. The first season of the Swamp Rabbits and under first-year head coach Brian Gratz was 29–33–9–1. The New York Rangers extended their affiliation with Greenville through the 2017–18 season.

The Swamp Rabbits would finish the 2016–17 season with a 40–26–5–1 record and secured the second seed in the South Division for the playoffs. The Swamp Rabbits lost to intrastate rivals, the South Carolina Stingrays, four-games-to-two in the first round.

During the 2017–18 season, owner Fred Festa sold the Swamp Rabbits to a multi-partner ownership group called South Carolina Pro Hockey, LLC, headed by former Rochester Americans' owner Steve Donner. The new ownership group confirmed their intentions of keeping the Swamp Rabbits in Greenville. At the end of the season and a last place finish in the Eastern Conference, the Swamp Rabbits fired third-year head coach Brian Gratz with a compiled 93–99–21–3 record. The team then hired Kevin Kerr as head coach after serving in the same capacity with the Macon Mayhem in the Southern Professional Hockey League for the previous three seasons. The Swamp Rabbits also played the 2018–19 season independent of an NHL affiliate after the Rangers affiliated with the new Maine Mariners for 2018–19 instead, and the Swamp Rabbits finished tied for last place in the league.

On June 26, 2019, the Swamp Rabbits announced an affiliation agreement with the Carolina Hurricanes and the Charlotte Checkers for the 2019–20 season. The season was curtailed by the COVID-19 pandemic with Swamp Rabbits in a playoff position for the first time since 2017, but the playoffs were cancelled. In May 2020, the team was sold to Spire Hockey South, a group associated with Spire Sports + Entertainment. The following 2020–21 season, the Hurricanes switched their AHL affiliation from the Checkers to the Chicago Wolves, but the Swamp Rabbits affiliated with the NHL's Florida Panthers in order to keep the nearby AHL affiliation with the Checkers.

On August 23, 2022, the Los Angeles Kings announced a 2-year affiliation with the Swamp Rabbits.

On January 16, 2023, team broadcaster Mark Shelley was selected to broadcast the 2023 Warrior/ECHL All-Star Classic on NHL Network from Norfolk, Virginia. Shelley later became the first Swamp Rabbits broadcaster to be named ECHL Broadcaster of the Year on June 29, 2023.

On April 16, 2024, the Los Angeles Kings and the Ontario Reign announced a 2-year affiliate extension with the Swamp Rabbits that will start in the beginning of the 2024-25 season and end in the 2025-26 season.

On September 2, 2026 LA Kings announced at the open house that they have renewed a multi year affiliation with Greenville the multi-year amount was not disclosed.

== Season-by-season records ==
Regular season										Playoffs				
Season	GP	W	L	OTL	SOL	Pts	GF	GA	Standing	Year	1st round	2nd round	3rd round	Kelly Cup Finals
2010–11	72	46	22	3	1	96	255	192	1st, South	2011	W, 3–1, ELM	L, 3–4, WHL	—	—
2011–12	72	41	25	2	4	88	232	215	2nd, South	2012	L, 0–3, FLA	—	—	—
2012–13	72	36	28	2	6	80	226	219	4th, South	2013	L, 2–4, REA	—	—	—
2013–14	72	39	27	2	4	84	220	208	3rd, South	2014	W, 4–2, KAL	W, 4–2, WHL	L, 2–4, CIN	—
2014–15	72	39	29	1	3	82	216	215	5th, East	2015	Did not qualify			
2015–16	72	29	33	9	1	68	205	243	5th, South	2016	Did not qualify			
2016–17	72	40	26	5	1	86	251	252	2nd, South	2017	L, 2–4, SC	—	—	—
2017–18	72	24	40	7	1	56	202	284	7th, South	2018	Did not qualify			
2018–19	72	25	41	3	3	56	192	254	7th, South	2019	Did not qualify			
2019–20	64	29	30	4	1	63	210	226	3rd, South	2020	Season cancelled			
2020–21	72	38	19	12	3	91	210	204	2nd, Eastern	2021	—	W, 3–1, IND	L, 1–3, SC	—
2021–22	72	33	29	6	4	76	210	209	4th, South	2022	L, 2–4, FLA	—	—	—
2022–23	72	40	23	8	1	89	244	211	3rd, South	2023	L, 2–4, JAX	—	—	—
2023–24	72	44	23	4	1	93	224	212	1st, South	2024	L, 2–4, ORL	—	—	—
2024–25	72	27	37	6	2	62	191	251	7th, South	2025	Did not qualify			

== Team and League honors ==
=== Retired numbers ===
Greenville Swamp Rabbits retired numbers
No.	Player	Position	Tenure	No. retirement
11	Bretton Cameron	RW	2012–2018	
