= Mathieu Roy (ice hockey, born 1986) =

Canadian ice hockey player

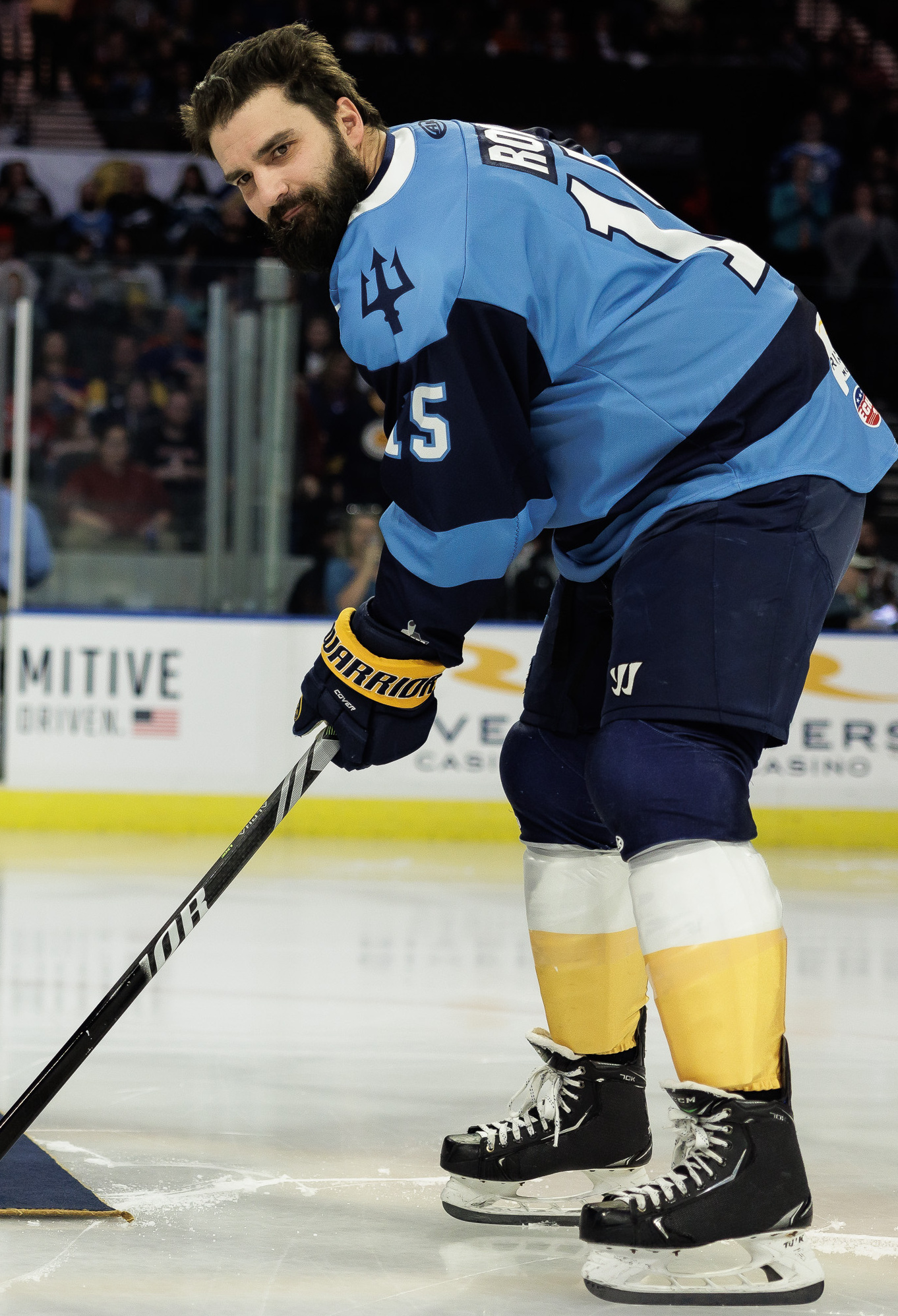
- Roy and with the Norfolk Admirals in 2024
- Born: November 14, 1986 (age 39) Amos, Quebec, Canada
- Height: 6 ft 0 in (183 cm)
- Weight: 196 lb (89 kg; 14 st 0 lb)
- Position: Left wing
- Shot: Left
- ECHL team Former teams: Norfolk Admirals; Rochester Americans; Albany River Rats; Lake Erie Monsters; Sheffield Steelers; Glasgow Clan
- NHL draft: Undrafted
- Playing career: 2007–2024

Mathieu R. Roy (born November 14, 1986) is a Canadian former professional ice hockey forward.

== Playing career ==
As a youth, Roy played in the 1997 Quebec International Pee-Wee Hockey Tournament with a minor ice hockey team from Beauce, Quebec.

Roy played junior hockey in the QMJHL for the Acadie–Bathurst Titan and the Val-d'Or Foreurs, before starting his professional career with the Pensacola Ice Pilots. He was moved to the Everblades for the 2008–09 season, and he primarily remained with the team, aside from two one-game call-ups to the AHL, where he played for the Albany River Rats and the Rochester Americans.

In his first season as captain of the Florida Everblades in 2011–12, Roy scored 46 points in 65 games and 10 points in the playoffs to help guide Florida to its first Kelly Cup championship. In re-signing to a one-year contract with the Everblades on July 24, 2012, it marked his fifth professional season with the club.

In the opening game of the 2012–13 season, Roy helped raised a special championship banner in a pre-game ceremony, before scoring the first goal of the season in a 5–4 overtime victory against the Orlando Solar Bears on October 13, 2012. Roy returned to the AHL for the first time since 2009, after he was loaned to the Lake Erie Monsters, and registered an assist, in a 7–6 overtime defeat to the Rochester Americans on December 26, 2012. Roy appeared in 3 games before he was returned to the ECHL for the remainder of the season. Roy recorded career highs with 89 points in 69 games with the Everblades, finishing as the league's top goal and points scorer, the first to do so since 2009, and earning two consecutive player of the month awards (February, March), a first since 2008.

After six seasons in the ECHL with the Everblades, Roy opted to pursue a European career, signing a one-year deal with Norwegian club, Tønsberg Vikings who were then with GET-ligaen on May 21, 2014. After Tønsberg suffered some internal problems, the team stepped down to a lower league and Roy decided to end his contract and then agreed to a contract with English club, the Sheffield Steelers of the Elite Ice Hockey League on July 24, 2014.

In July 2019, Roy returned to hockey and the UK by signing with Glasgow Clan of the EIHL, a team coached by his former Sheffield teammate Zack Fitzgerald.

On August 27, 2020, Roy returned to North America to continue his career in the ECHL, agreeing to a contract with the Kalamazoo Wings.

With Kalamazoo not taking part in the 2020–21 ECHL season, Roy signed for SPHL side Knoxville Ice Bears in February 2021.

In July 2021, Roy returned to the Glasgow Clan of the EIHL ahead of the 2021–22 Elite League season. He was then named captain for the 2022-23 season, but left Glasgow in December 2022 to pursue a 'long-term opportunity' back in North America.

Roy then signed a deal to return to the ECHL with Norfolk Admirals. He played until the end of the 2024 season.

== Career statistics ==
			Regular season					Playoffs
Season	Team	League	GP	G	A	Pts	PIM	GP	G	A	Pts	PIM
2001–02	Amos Forestiers	QAAA	41	14	30	44	40	—	—	—	—	—
2002–03	Amos Forestiers	QAAA	40	22	50	72	44	—	—	—	—	—
2003–04	Acadie-Bathurst Titan	QMJHL	70	19	21	40	54	—	—	—	—	—
2004–05	Acadie-Bathurst Titan	QMJHL	70	33	25	58	85	—	—	—	—	—
2005–06	Acadie-Bathurst Titan	QMJHL	65	50	54	104	101	17	7	12	19	26
2006–07	Val-d'Or Foreurs	QMJHL	63	42	45	87	70	20	10	14	24	20
2007–08	Pensacola Ice Pilots	ECHL	72	16	29	45	50	—	—	—	—	—
2008–09	Florida Everblades	ECHL	69	22	24	46	119	9	2	3	5	6
2008–09	Rochester Americans	AHL	1	0	1	1	0	—	—	—	—	—
2008–09	Albany River Rats	AHL	1	0	0	0	0	—	—	—	—	—
2009–10	Florida Everblades	ECHL	51	13	13	26	83	—	—	—	—	—
2010–11	Florida Everblades	ECHL	67	16	13	29	107	4	2	0	2	4
2011–12	Florida Everblades	ECHL	65	18	28	46	108	18	5	5	10	16
2012–13	Florida Everblades	ECHL	69	38	51	89	97	13	8	5	13	38
2012–13	Lake Erie Monsters	AHL	3	0	1	1	0	—	—	—	—	—
2013–14	Florida Everblades	ECHL	53	26	30	56	46	—	—	—	—	—
2014–15	Sheffield Steelers	EIHL	52	36	43	79	42	4	4	2	6	0
2015–16	Sheffield Steelers	EIHL	48	25	16	41	54	2	1	1	2	4
2016–17	Sheffield Steelers	EIHL	52	28	29	57	28	4	0	2	2	2
2017–18	Sheffield Steelers	EIHL	51	22	26	48	36	4	1	1	2	0
2019–20	Glasgow Clan	EIHL	35	14	10	24	16	—	—	—	—	—
2020–21	Knoxville Ice Bears	SPHL	25	11	9	20	16	2	0	1	1	0
2021–22	Glasgow Clan	EIHL	53	33	25	58	46	2	0	1	1	0
2022–23	Glasgow Clan	EIHL	21	9	10	19	12	—	—	—	—	—
2022–23	Norfolk Admirals	ECHL	48	14	16	30	22	—	—	—	—	—
2023–24	Norfolk Admirals	ECHL	59	14	17	31	20	11	3	5	8	8
AHL totals			5	0	2	2	0	—	—	—	—	—

== Awards and honours ==
Award	Year
ECHL
First All-Star Team	2013
Most Points (89)	2013
Most Goals (38)	2013
ECHL Player of the Month (February)	2013
ECHL Player of the Month (March)	2013
ECHL Player of the Week (3/25-3/30)	2013
