= Florida Everblades =

Professional minor league ice hockey team based in Estero, Florida

- City: Estero, Florida
- League: ECHL
- Conference: Eastern
- Division: South
- Founded: 1998
- Home arena: Hertz Arena
- Colors: Kelly Green, White, Gray
- Owner: David Hoffmann
- President: Craig Brush
- General manager: Brad Ralph
- Head coach: Brad Ralph
- Media: WBCN
- Affiliates: Pittsburgh Penguins (NHL); Wilkes-Barre/Scranton Penguins (AHL)
- Website: www.floridaeverblades.com

Franchise history
- 1998–present: Florida Everblades

Championships
- Regular season titles: 4 (1999–00, 2008–09, 2017–18, 2020–21)
- Division titles: 9 (1999–00, 2006–07, 2008–09, 2014–15, 2016–17, 2017–18, 2018–19, 2021–22, 2025–26)
- Conference titles: 8 (2003–04, 2004–05, 2011–12, 2017–18, 2021–22, 2022–23, 2023–24, 2025–26)
- Kelly Cups: 5 (2011–12, 2021–22, 2022–23, 2023–24, 2025–26)

The Florida Everblades are a professional minor league ice hockey team based in Estero, Florida, in the Cape Coral-Fort Myers metropolitan area. They play in the ECHL and play their home games at Hertz Arena. The Everblades are the ECHL affiliate of the National Hockey League's Pittsburgh Penguins and the American Hockey League's Wilkes-Barre/Scranton Penguins.

The Everblades were founded in 1998. They play in the South Division of the Eastern Conference in the ECHL. They have failed to qualify for the playoffs just once in team history (2013–14) and have made eight appearances in the Kelly Cup finals, winning in 2012, 2022, 2023, 2024, and 2026; the 2022, 2023, and 2024 championships were the first three-peat in ECHL history.

== History ==
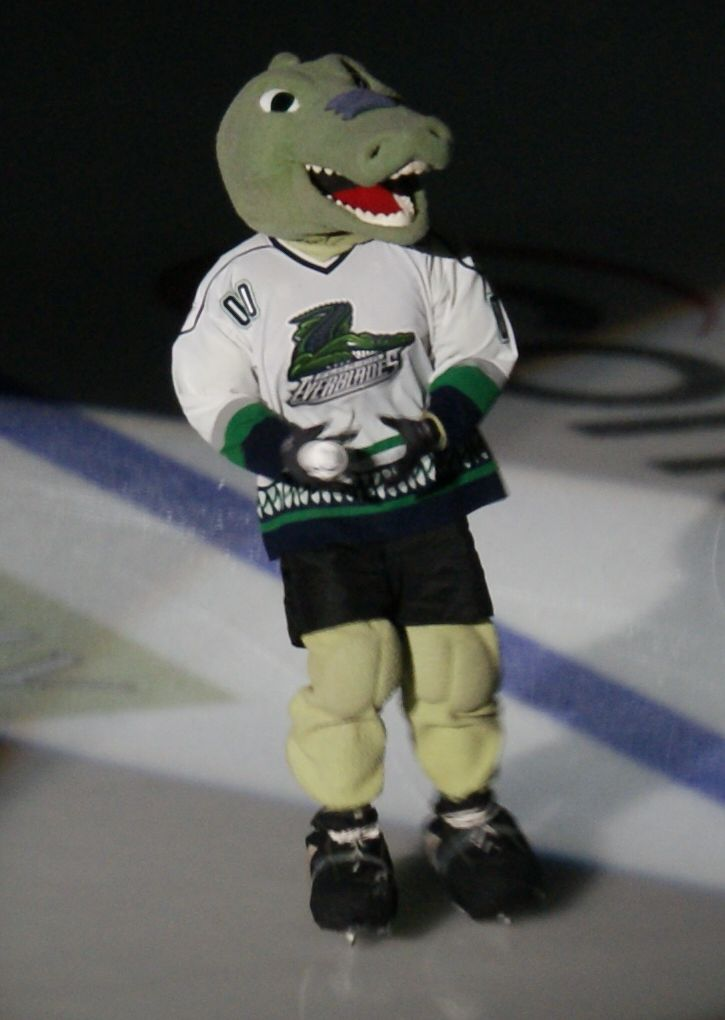
Swampee, the mascot of the Florida Everblades

The team was founded in 1998 by Craig Brush, Peter Karmanos Jr., and Thomas Thewes and was named based on the Florida Everglades. The Everblades' logo features a gator-head design fused in the form of an ice skate. Barnstorm Creative Group, a Vancouver graphic design company, designed the logo. Barnstorm was contacted by Carolina Hurricanes owner Peter Karmanos Jr., who came up with the idea of choosing the Everblades' colors as blue and green, in tribute to the Hartford Whalers team that Karmanos moved to Raleigh, North Carolina.

The Everblades' inaugural home opener featured a pre-game ceremony in which a large alligator was brought onto the ice to pay tribute to the team's name and logo, as well as Florida's vast population of reptile species. The Everblades won their first Kelly Cup on May 23, 2012, against the Las Vegas Wranglers. Brandon MacLean scored the championship-winning-goal in overtime during game five. Everblades goaltender, John Muse, was named the most valuable player of the 2012 Kelly Cup playoffs.

=== 2012 Kelly Cup Finals ===
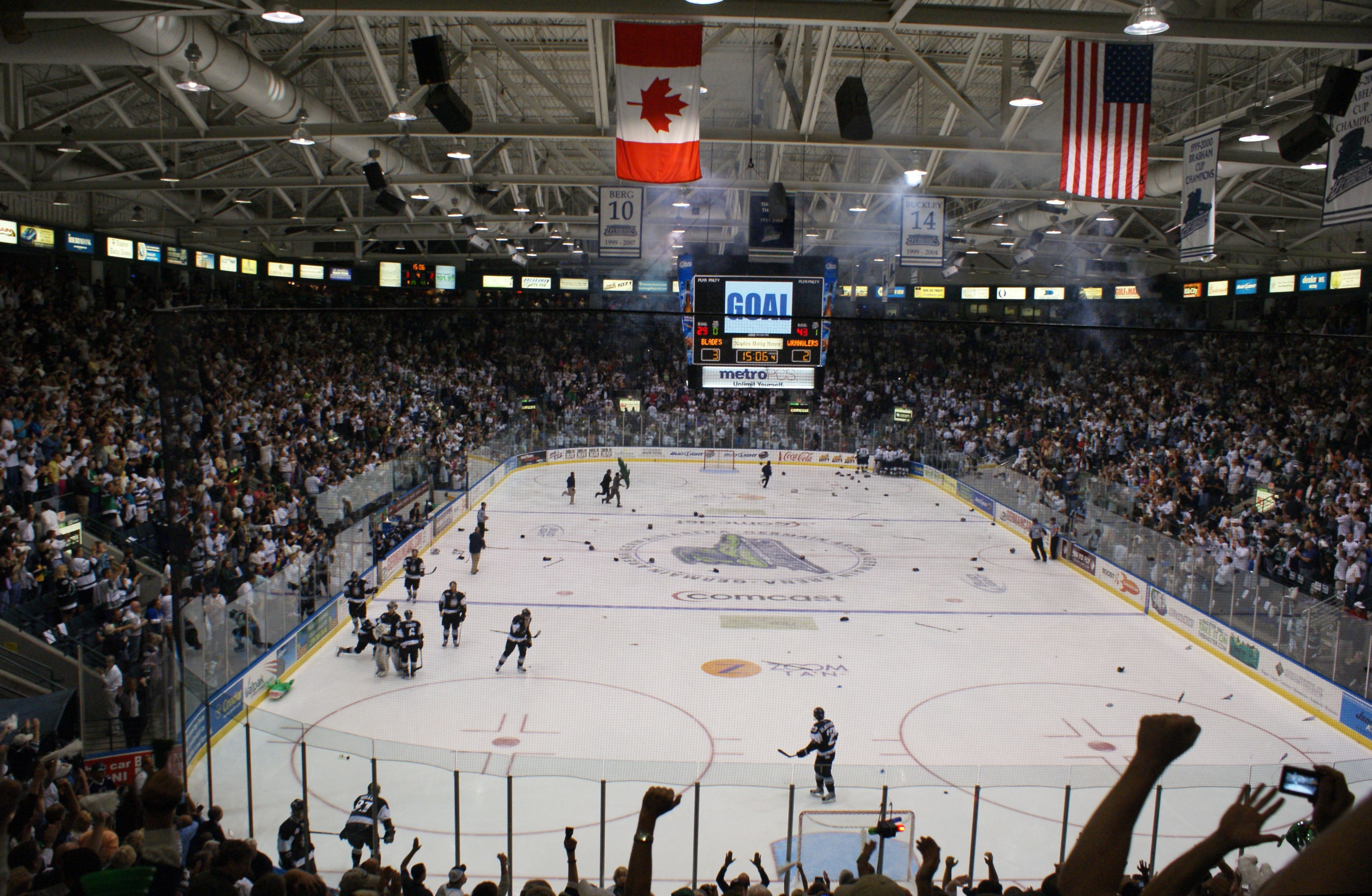
The Everblades celebrate their victory in Game 5 of the Kelly Cup Finals on May 23, 2012.

Florida won the 2012 Kelly Cup playoffs with a 4–1 victory at home in front of a standing-room-only crowd of 7,290. The first period saw Las Vegas Wranglers goalie Joe Fallon beaten by Justin Shugg and Mike Ratchuk, but Las Vegas edged back to even the score by the third, with Ash Goldie and Peter MacArthur beating John Muse to force the overtime. At 4:54 into the overtime, after Ryan Donald passed to Matt Beca, who in turn sent the puck to Brandon MacLean, who beat Fallon and secured the victory.

The win earned Florida the 2012 Kelly Cup and secured a perfect home record of 11–0 in the postseason (two victories over Greenville and three each over Elmira, Kalamazoo, and Las Vegas). Additionally, John Muse earned the Kelly Cup Finals MVP award.

=== Ownership and affiliation changes ===
In April 2013, owner Peter Karmanos, Jr. announced he would be selling the team along with Germain Arena to "simplify things" in his life, as he had just retired from the company he founded, Compuware. The team was made for sale and was being shopped by Park Lane, a sports investment-banking firm that specializes in the sale of sports teams. In 2018, Karmanos gave up majority control of the Hurricanes to new majority owner Thomas Dundon. After the 2018–19 season, the Everblades dropped the Hurricanes affiliation for the first time and partnered with the Nashville Predators.

On August 5, 2019, reports states Karmanos had sold both the team and arena to David Hoffmann, a Naples, Florida, resident and real estate investor. Starting in the 2022–23 season, the Everblades ended their affiliation with the Predators and entered a multi-year agreement with the Florida Panthers. On June 13, 2024, team president Craig Brush announced that the team would not be renewing its agreement with the Panthers. On July 10 of that year, the Everblades announced a new multi-year agreement with the St. Louis Blues, which lasted until the end of the 2026 season. On July 16, 2026, with the Hoffmann family purchasing the Pittsburgh Penguins, the Everblades announced that they would become the new ECHL affiliate of the Penguins, ending their 29-year relationship with the Wheeling Nailers.

== Logos ==
Through the Everblades' history, they have had five anniversary logos: the fifth anniversary logo in 2002–03, the 10th anniversary logo in 2007–08, the 15th anniversary logo in 2012–13, the 20th anniversary logo in 2017–18, and the 25th anniversary logo in 2022–23.

== Season-by-season record ==
Season	Conference	Division	Regular season											Postseason			
Season	Conference	Division	Finish	GP	W	L	OTL	SOL	Pts	Pct	GF	GA	Head coach	GP	W	L	Result
1998–99	Southern	Southeast	2nd	70	45	20	0	5	95	0.679	253	180	Bob Ferguson	6	3	3	Won conference quarterfinal 3–0 vs. Birmingham; Lost conference semifinal 0–3 vs. Mississippi
1999–00	Southern	Southeast	1st	70	53	15	0	2	108	0.771	277	181	Bob Ferguson	5	2	3	Lost conference quarterfinal 2–3 vs. Augusta
2000–01	Southern	Southeast	2nd	72	38	26	0	8	84	0.583	236	242	Bob Ferguson	5	2	3	Lost conference quarterfinal 2–3 vs. Pee Dee
2001–02	Southern	Southeast	5th	72	37	27	0	8	82	0.569	207	221	Gerry Fleming	6	3	3	Won division wildcard 1–0 vs. South Carolina; Lost conference quarterfinal 2–3 vs. Greenville
2002–03	Southern	Southeast	4th	72	35	23	0	14	84	0.583	239	243	Gerry Fleming	1	0	1	Lost division wildcard 0–1 vs. Greenville
2003–04	Eastern	Southern	3rd	72	37	25	0	10	84	0.583	239	221	Gerry Fleming	18	10	8	Won division semifinal 3–2 vs. Roanoke; Won Division Finals 3–0 vs. South Carolina; Won conference final 3–2 vs. Reading; Lost Kelly Cup final 1–4 vs. Idaho
2004–05	American	South	2nd	72	42	20	4	6	94	0.653	237	192	Gerry Fleming	19	12	7	Won conference quarterfinal 3–1 vs. South Carolina; Won in Conference Semifinal 3–0 vs. Greenville; Won conference final 4–2 vs. Charlotte; Lost Kelly Cup final 2–4 vs. Trenton
2005–06	American	South	2nd	72	48	20	3	1	100	0.694	267	208	Gerry Fleming	8	4	4	Won division semifinal 3–1 vs. Greenville; Lost division final 1–3 vs. Gwinnett
2006–07	American	South	1st	72	44	22	4	2	94	0.653	272	212	Gerry Fleming	16	10	6	Won division semifinal 3–0 vs. Charlotte; Won division final 4–2 vs. Texas; Lost conference final 3–4 vs. Dayton
2007–08	American	South	4th	72	39	25	4	4	86	0.597	230	198	Gerry Fleming	3	0	3	Lost division quarterfinal 0–3 vs. Columbia
2008–09^{1}	American	South	1st	71	49	17	2	3	103	0.725	269	187	Malcolm Cameron	11	6	5	Won division semifinal 4–1 vs. Gwinnett; Lost division final 2–4 vs. South Carolina
2009–10	American	South	3rd	72	38	25	4	5	85	0.590	234	221	Malcolm Cameron	9	3	6	Won conference quarterfinal 3–2 vs. Elmira; Lost conference semifinal 0–4 vs. Reading
2010–11	Eastern	South	3rd	72	37	30	1	4	79	0.549	236	222	Greg Poss	4	1	3	Lost conference quarterfinal 1–3 vs. Kalamazoo
2011–12	Eastern	South	3rd	72	39	26	2	5	85	0.590	260	218	Greg Poss	18	15	3	Won conference quarterfinal 3–0 vs. Greenville; Won conference semifinal 4–1 vs. Elmira; Won conference final 4–1 vs. Kalamazoo; Won Kelly Cup final 4–1 vs. Las Vegas
2012–13	Eastern	South	2nd	72	39	22	4	7	89	0.618	260	241	Greg Poss	13	7	6	Won conference quarterfinal 4–2 vs. Elmira; Lost conference semifinal 3–4 vs. Reading
2013–14	Eastern	South	4th	72	37	27	3	5	82	0.569	240	222	Greg Poss	Did not qualify for 2014 Kelly Cup playoffs			
2014–15	Eastern	East	1st	72	49	16	2	5	105	0.729	267	208	Greg Poss	12	6	6	Won division semifinal 4–2 vs. Orlando; Lost division final 2–4 vs. South Carolina
2015–16	Eastern	South	2nd	72	46	23	1	2	95	.660	226	175	Greg Poss	6	2	4	Lost conference quarterfinals 2–4 vs. Wheeling
2016–17	Eastern	South	1st	72	46	21	2	3	97	.674	275	219	Brad Ralph	12	5	7	Won division semifinal 4–3 vs. Orlando; Lost division final 1–4 vs. South Carolina
2017–18	Eastern	South	1st	72	53	13	2	4	112	.778	261	171	Brad Ralph	21	15	6	Won division semifinal 4–0 vs. Atlanta; Won division final 4–1 vs. Orlando; Won conference final 4–1 vs. Adirondack; Lost Kelly Cup final 3–4 vs. Colorado
2018–19	Eastern	South	1st	72	50	16	5	1	106	.736	276	181	Brad Ralph	16	9	7	Won division semifinal 4–2 vs. Jacksonville; Won division final 4–1 vs. Orlando; Lost conference final 1–4 vs. Newfoundland
2019–20^{2}	Eastern	South	—	62	43	13	4	2	92	.742	227	156	Brad Ralph	Season cancelled due to the COVID-19 pandemic			
2020–21	Eastern	—	1st	69	42	19	5	3	92	.667	233	193	Brad Ralph	5	2	3	Lost conference semifinal 2–3 vs. South Carolina
2021–22	Eastern	South	1st	72	42	20	6	4	94	.653	243	187	Brad Ralph	20	16	4	Won division semifinal 4–2 vs. Greenville; Won division final 4–0 vs. Jacksonville; Won conference final 4–1 vs. Newfoundland; Won Kelly Cup Final 4–1 vs. Toledo
2022–23	Eastern	South	4th	72	38	25	4	5	85	.590	225	213	Brad Ralph	22	16	6	Won division semifinal 4–2 vs. South Carolina; Won division final 4–2 vs. Jacksonville; Won conference final 4–2 vs. Newfoundland; Won Kelly Cup final 4–0 vs. Idaho
2023–24	Eastern	South	3rd	72	40	23	7	2	89	.618	224	186	Brad Ralph	18	16	7	Won division semifinal 4–3 vs. Jacksonville; Won division final 4–1 vs. Orlando; Won conference final 4–2 vs. Adirondack; Won Kelly Cup final 4–1 vs. Kansas City
2024–25	Eastern	South	2nd	72	49	15	7	1	106	.736	241	165	Brad Ralph	15	10	5	Won division semifinal 4–0 vs. Jacksonville; Won division final 4–1 vs. Orlando; Lost conference final 2–4 vs. Trois-Rivières
2025–26	Eastern	South	1st	72	49	13	7	3	108	.750	245	142	Brad Ralph	20	16	4	Won division semifinal 4–0 vs. Savannah; Won division final 4–1 vs. South Carolina; Won Conference final 4–1 vs. Wheeling; Won Kelly Cup final 4–2 vs Kansas City
Totals				1,998	1,204	587	83	124	2,615	.654	6,899	5605	—	309	191	123	26 Playoff Appearances

^{1} The 2008–09 team played 71 games because of scheduling changes caused by the Augusta Lynx and Fresno Falcons ceasing operations mid-season. Four of the five teams (Florida, Charlotte, South Carolina, Mississippi) played 71 games, with Gwinnett playing 72.

^{2} The 2019–20 ECHL season was suspended on March 12, 2020 due to the COVID-19 pandemic, and the rest of the season was cancelled on March 14, 2020.

== Players ==
=== Retired numbers ===
Florida Everblades retired numbers
No.	Player	Position	Career	No. retirement
9	Ernie Hartlieb	LW	2004–2011	October 19, 2012
10	Reggie Berg	C	1999–2007	October 19, 2007
14	Tom Buckley	C	1999–2004	October 19, 2007
25	John McCarron	C	2016-2023	April 18, 2026

Berg and Buckley's numbers were retired during a pre-game ceremony on October 19, 2007, as the Everblades hosted the Mississippi Sea Wolves, in what would be the Sea Wolves' first official regular season game after being placed on a two-year hiatus due to the aftermath of Hurricane Katrina. Banners made with their jersey numbers were hung to the rafters of Germain Arena.

Hartlieb's number was retired in a ceremony before a game against the Orlando Solar Bears on October 19, 2012. Hartlieb was presented with an ECHL Championship ring (he filled in on with the team in the 2011–12 regular season, but did not appear in the playoffs), and hoisted the Kelly Cup. A banner made with his number was hung to the rafters of Germain Arena next to Berg and Buckley's.

McCarron's number was retired before a game against the Reading Royals on April 18, 2026, with Berg, Buckley and Hartlieb in attendance.

=== Notable players ===
Florida Everblades alumni that advanced to play in the NHL after playing for the club:

- Mike Angelidis
- Keith Aucoin
- Clark Bishop
- Patrick Bordeleau
- Eric Boulton
- David Brine
- Brett Carson
- Devin Cooley
- Scott Darling
- Kristers Gudlevskis
- Matt Hendricks
- Hayden Hodgson
- Tanner Jeannot
- Ty Jones
- Anton Khudobin
- Connor Knapp
- Greg Koehler
- Greg Kuznik
- Drew Larman
- Chad LaRose
- Martin Lojek
- Steven Lorentz
- Brett Lysak
- Jeff Malott
- Eric Manlow
- Kenndal McArdle
- Jason Morgan
- Alex Nedeljkovic
- Tommy Novak
- Doug O'Brien
- Ryan O'Byrne
- Justin Peters
- Justin Shugg
- Wilmer Skoog
- Cole Smith
- Dalton Smith
- Jared Staal
- Mark Stuart
- Damian Surma
- Brody Sutter
- Rob Zepp

Florida Everblades that played in the NHL before playing with the team:

- Akim Aliu
- Ken Appleby
- Justin Auger
- Chris Beckford-Tseu
- Brad Brown
- Kevin Brown
- Barry Brust
- Brett Bulmer
- Mike Card
- Brad Church
- Matt Corrente
- Kevin Czuczman
- Trevor Daley
- Stefan Della Rovere
- Nicolas Deschamps
- Jon DiSalvatore
- David Dziurzynski
- Brad Fast
- Paul Healey
- Riku Helenius
- Shane Hnidy
- Josh Ho-Sang
- Brayden Irwin
- Bryce Lampman
- Nick Lappin
- Pat MacLeod
- Tom McCollum
- Grant McNeill
- Mike Morrison
- Kevin Quick
- Brian Rafalski
- Remi Royer
- Richard Shulmistra
- Matthew Spiller
- Nick Tarnasky
- Kris Vernarsky
- Allen York

== Franchise records and leaders ==
=== All-time franchise record holders ===
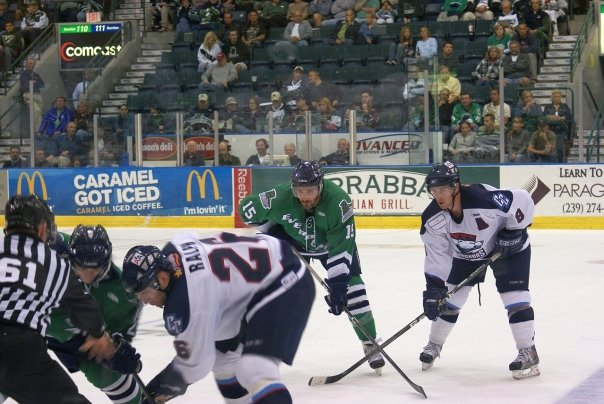
Mathieu Roy of the Everblades and Ryan Murphy of the Charlotte Checkers await a faceoff during a game on March 9, 2009. Roy is wearing the alternate green uniform of the Everblades.

- Games Played: Mathieu Roy – 374
- Goals: John McCarron – 152
- Assists: John McCarron – 212
- Points: John McCarron – 364
- Power play goals: Mathieu Roy – 40
- Penalty minutes: Kyle Neuber – 900
- Goaltender Games Played: Cam Johnson – 243
- Goaltender Wins: Cam Johnson - 150

=== Individual records and streaks ===
Individual records

- Most goals - game: 4 (5 times, last by Sam Stange, Mar. 21, 2026 vs. Orlando)
- Most assists - game: 4 (13 times, last by Ben Masella Mar. 17, 2023 at Trois-Rivieres)
- Most points - game: 6 (twice, both by Jacob Micflikier, last on Nov. 5, 2009 at Charlotte)
- Most shots - game: 12 (3 times, last by Kevin Baker, Jan. 13, 2009 at Charlotte)
- Most penalty minutes - game: 37 (Kyle Kos, Mar. 22, 2003 at South Carolina)
- Most saves - game: 58 (Rob Zepp, Dec. 27, 2003 at Gwinnett)
- Most saves - period: 25 (twice, last by Rob Zepp, Dec. 27, 2003 at Gwinnett (1st))

Individual streaks

- Consecutive game goal scoring streak: 9 (Keith Anderson 10/18/03 – 11/8/03 and Brendan O'Donnell 3/25/16 – 04/09/16)
- Consecutive game assist streak: 10 (Daniel Sisca (12/9/05 – 12/28/05))
- Consecutive game point streak: 16 (Tom Buckley (10/26/01 – 12/7/01))
- Consecutive games started streak: 15 (twice, last by Craig Kowalski (2/10/07 – 3/10/07))
- Longest winning streak: 10 (Cam Johnson (11/9/24 - 12/13/24))
- Longest unbeaten streak: 12 (Cam Johnson (11/9/24 – 12/20/24) (11-0-1)
- Longest shutout streak: 163:43 (Randy Petruk (11/3/01 – 12/14/01))

=== ECHL Hall of Fame ===
Former Florida Everblades goalie Marc Magliarditi was inducted into the ECHL's Hall of Fame on January 23, 2013. Magliarditi played for the Everblades from 1998 through 2001.

Florida Everblades President and General Manager Craig Brush was inducted into the ECHL Hall of Fame on February 5, 2016. Brush has served as the team's President and General Manager since the team's inception in 1998 and he oversees all aspects of both the hockey club and the sports complex. Brush also served as the Chairman of the ECHL Board of Governors for three seasons from 2003 through 2006.

== Awards and trophies ==
=== E.A. "Bud" Gingher Memorial Trophy ===
The Everblades have won the E.A. "Bud" Gingher Memorial Trophy seven times, in 2004, 2005, 2012, 2018 and 2022, 2023 and 2024.

In 2004, the trophy was given to the champion of the Eastern Conference; the Everblades beat the Reading Royals 3–2 to win the conference but lost the Kelly Cup to the Idaho Steelheads. In 2005, the Gingher trophy was given to the American Conference champion. The Everblades beat the Charlotte Checkers 4–2 to win the conference before losing to the Trenton Titans in the Cup finals. In 2012, the Everblades won the Gingher Memorial Trophy by defeating the Kalamazoo Wings 4–1 in the Eastern Conference finals and went on to win the Kelly Cup over the Las Vegas Wranglers. In 2018, the Everblades went 12–2 through three rounds of conference playoffs and won the Gingher Memorial Trophy before losing the Kelly Cup in seven games to the Colorado Eagles. In 2022, the Everblades went 12–3 through three rounds of conference playoffs and won the Gingher Memorial Trophy by defeating the Newfoundland Growlers 4–1 in the Eastern Conference finals and went on to win the Kelly Cup in five games against the Brabham Cup Champion Toledo Walleye. In 2023, the Everblades went 12-3 through three rounds of the playoffs defeating the Newfoundland Growlers in the conference finals before sweeping the Brabham Cup Champion Idaho Steelheads 4-0 in the Kelly Cup Finals. In 2024, the Everblades went 12-6 through three rounds of the playoffs knocking off the Adirondack Thunder and then defeated the Brabham Cup Champion Kansas City Mavericks 4-1 in the Kelly Cup Finals.

=== Brabham Cup ===
In the 1999–00, 2008–09, 2017–18, and 2020–21 seasons, the Everblades won the Brabham Cup, a trophy given to the team that has the best regular season record in the league. The Everblades took the trophy with 108 points in 1999–2000 and 112 points in 2017–18. The 2008–09 and 2020–21 trophies were awarded to the team with the best points percentage due to imbalanced schedules, where the Everblades had 0.725 and 0.667 winning percentages, respectively.

=== Kelly Cup Titles ===
The Florida Everblades have won the Kelly Cup an ECHL league record five times. The Everblades hoisted their first Kelly Cup in 2012 taking the series 4 games to 1 over the Las Vegas Wranglers. A decade later, they won the Cup in 2022 in another five game series, defeating the Toledo Walleye 4 games to 1. The Everblades would repeat as champions in 2023 4 games to none over the Idaho Steelheads. In 2024, the Everblades became the first team to win three consecutive Kelly Cups by defeating the Kansas City Mavericks 4 game to 1. In 2026, Florida won its 5th Kelly Cup and 4th over a span of 5 years defeating the Kansas City Mavericks 4 games to 2.

=== Individual and Team Honors ===
1998–99: John Brophy Award (Bob Ferguson)

1999–00: Brabham Cup
John Brophy Award (Bob Ferguson)
Plus Performer Award (Andy MacIntyre)

2000–01: Executive of the Year (Craig Brush)

2003–04: Gingher Memorial Trophy

2004–05: Gingher Memorial Trophy
Reebok Goaltender of the Year (Chris Madden)

2005–06: Sportsmanship Award (Steve Saviano)
Reebok Equipment Manager of the Year (John Jennings)

2008–09: Brabham Cup
CCM U+ Most Valuable Player (Kevin Baker)
Leading Scorer (Kevin Baker)

2011–12: Gingher Memorial Trophy
Kelly Cup
Kelly Cup Playoffs Most Valuable Player (John Muse)

2012–13: Leading Scorer (Mathieu Roy)

2015–16: ECHL CCM Rookie of the Year (Matt Willows)
ECHL Community Service Award (Rob Florentino)

2017–18: Brabham Cup
Gingher Memorial Trophy
John Brophy Award (Brad Ralph)

2020–21: Brabham Cup
Goaltender of the Year (Jake Hildebrand)
Plus Performer Award (John McCarron)

2021–22: Gingher Memorial Trophy
Kelly Cup
Kelly Cup Playoffs Most Valuable Player (Cam Johnson)

2022–23: Gingher Memorial Trophy
Kelly Cup
Kelly Cup Playoffs Most Valuable Player (Cam Johnson)

2023–24: Gingher Memorial Trophy
Kelly Cup
Kelly Cup Playoffs Most Valuable Player (Oliver Chau)

2025–26: Gingher Memorial Trophy
Kelly Cup
Kelly Cup Playoffs Most Valuable Player (Cam Johnson)

Preceded by Pee Dee Pride; Cincinnati Cyclones; Toledo Walleye; Not awarded	Brabham Cup champions 1990–2000; 2011–12; 2017–18; 2020–21	Succeeded by Trenton Titans; Idaho Steelheads; Cincinnati Cyclones; Toledo Walleye
Preceded by Alaska Aces; Fort Wayne Komets; Trois-Rivières Lions	Kelly Cup champions 2012; 2022, 2023, 2024; 2026	Succeeded by Reading Royals; Trois-Rivières Lions; Incumbent
