= 2023–24 ECHL season =

Ice hockey league season

- League: ECHL
- Sport: Ice hockey
- Duration: October 19, 2023 – April 14, 2024

Regular season
- Brabham Cup: Kansas City Mavericks
- Season MVP: Brandon Hawkins (Toledo)
- Top scorer: Brandon Hawkins (Toledo)

Playoffs
- Eastern champions: Florida Everblades
- Eastern runners-up: Adirondack Thunder
- Western champions: Kansas City Mavericks
- Western runners-up: Toledo Walleye
- Playoffs MVP: Oliver Chau (Florida)

Kelly Cup
- Champions: Florida Everblades
- Runners-up: Kansas City Mavericks

ECHL seasons
- ← 2022–23 2024–25 →

The 2023–24 ECHL season was the 36th season of the ECHL. The regular season began on October 19, 2023, and ended on April 14, 2024, with the 2024 Kelly Cup playoffs to follow. Twenty-eight teams, all of which are affiliated with an NHL team, in 20 states and two Canadian provinces are scheduled to play 72 games.

The league terminated the Newfoundland Growlers franchise by league bylaws on April 2, 2024, after the St. John's-based team's owners could not finalize the sale of the team (the Trois-Rivières Lions were sold, however, and they also owned the Lions). With this termination and following cancellation of their remaining games (3 v. Trois-Rivières and 3 v. Norfolk), the ECHL announced that the North Division standings would be decided by point percentage to make up for the missing games for Trois-Rivières and the Norfolk Admirals.

On June 8, the Florida Everblades won their third consecutive and fourth overall Kelly Cup championship over the Kansas City Mavericks in five games, becoming the first team in ECHL history to three-peat.

== League changes ==
On April 2, 2024, the ECHL terminated the membership of the Newfoundland Growlers for failure to fulfill league bylaws. Both the Newfoundland Growlers and the Trois-Rivières Lions were owned by Deacon Sports and Entertainment and had been experiencing financial difficulties. On April 8, 2024, the league approved the sale of the Trois-Rivières Lions to Spire Sports + Entertainment.

Former Newfoundland Growlers signed to a standard player contract were released as unrestricted free agents, allowing them to sign with another team for the remainder of the season. However, former Newfoundland Growlers under an AHL or NHL structured contract were ineligible to play the six remaining games.

=== Coaching changes ===
| Old Coach | New Coach | Team |
|---|---|---|
| Ben Boudreau | Jesse Kallechy | Fort Wayne Komets |
| Eric Wellwood | Matt Cooke | Newfoundland Growlers |
| Dan Watson | Pat Mikesch | Toledo Walleye |
| Marc-Andre Bergeron | Ron Choules | Trois-Rivières Lions |

=== Affiliation changes ===
| ECHL team | New affiliates | Former affiliates |
|---|---|---|
| Atlanta Gladiators | Nashville Predators (NHL); Milwaukee Admirals (AHL) | Arizona Coyotes (NHL); Tucson Roadrunners (AHL) |
| Cincinnati Cyclones | New York Rangers (NHL); Hartford Wolf Pack (AHL) | Buffalo Sabres (NHL); Rochester Americans (AHL) |
| Jacksonville Icemen | Buffalo Sabres (NHL); Rochester Americans (AHL) | New York Rangers (NHL); Hartford Wolf Pack (AHL) |
| Kalamazoo Wings | Vancouver Canucks (NHL); Abbotsford Canucks (AHL) | Columbus Blue Jackets (NHL); Cleveland Monsters (AHL) |
| Norfolk Admirals | Winnipeg Jets (NHL); Manitoba Moose (AHL) | Carolina Hurricanes (NHL); Chicago Wolves (AHL) |

== All-star game ==
The 2024 All Star Game was held in January 2024, at Enmarket Arena, home arena of the Savannah Ghost Pirates.

== Standings ==
Final standings

=== Eastern Conference ===
x – clinched playoff spot, y – clinched regular season division title, z – Brabham Cup (regular season) champion
e – indicates team has been eliminated from playoff contention, coi – ceased operations immediately

| North Division† | GP | W | L | OTL | SOL | GF | GA | Pts | Pts% |
|---|---|---|---|---|---|---|---|---|---|
| y – Adirondack Thunder (NJD) | 72 | 43 | 18 | 7 | 4 | 241 | 212 | 97 | 0.674 |
| x – Norfolk Admirals (WPG) | 69 | 41 | 21 | 6 | 1 | 245 | 199 | 89 | 0.645 |
| x – Trois-Rivières Lions (MTL) | 69 | 31 | 30 | 5 | 3 | 204 | 229 | 70 | 0.507 |
| x – Maine Mariners (BOS) | 72 | 32 | 32 | 8 | 0 | 250 | 260 | 72 | 0.500 |
| Worcester Railers (NYI) | 72 | 32 | 32 | 5 | 3 | 210 | 238 | 72 | 0.500 |
| Reading Royals (PHI) | 72 | 29 | 35 | 6 | 2 | 198 | 247 | 66 | 0.458 |
| coi – Newfoundland Growlers (TOR) | 66 | 28 | 28 | 8 | 2 | 220 | 234 | 66 | 0.500 |

† Points percentage was used to determine playoff seedings due to the Newfoundland Growlers ceasing operations, causing the Norfolk Admirals and Trois-Rivières Lions to play three fewer games.

| South Division | GP | W | L | OTL | SOL | GF | GA | Pts | Pts% |
|---|---|---|---|---|---|---|---|---|---|
| y – Greenville Swamp Rabbits (LAK) | 72 | 44 | 23 | 4 | 1 | 224 | 212 | 93 | 0.646 |
| x – Jacksonville Icemen (BUF) | 72 | 42 | 23 | 6 | 1 | 238 | 195 | 91 | 0.632 |
| x – Florida Everblades (FLA) | 72 | 40 | 23 | 7 | 2 | 224 | 163 | 89 | 0.618 |
| x – Orlando Solar Bears (TBL) | 72 | 38 | 24 | 7 | 3 | 220 | 206 | 86 | 0.597 |
| South Carolina Stingrays (WAS) | 72 | 39 | 26 | 4 | 3 | 249 | 218 | 85 | 0.590 |
| Savannah Ghost Pirates (VGK) | 72 | 30 | 34 | 7 | 1 | 218 | 243 | 68 | 0.472 |
| Atlanta Gladiators (NSH) | 72 | 23 | 45 | 3 | 1 | 187 | 264 | 50 | 0.347 |

=== Western Conference ===
| Central Division | GP | W | L | OTL | SOL | GF | GA | Pts | Pts% |
|---|---|---|---|---|---|---|---|---|---|
| y – Toledo Walleye (DET) ^{1} | 71 | 48 | 14 | 4 | 5 | 289 | 209 | 105 | 0.739 |
| x – Indy Fuel (CHI) | 72 | 39 | 25 | 6 | 2 | 230 | 221 | 86 | 0.597 |
| x –Wheeling Nailers (PIT) ^{1} | 71 | 38 | 28 | 4 | 1 | 232 | 204 | 81 | 0.570 |
| x –Kalamazoo Wings (VAN) | 72 | 38 | 30 | 4 | 0 | 214 | 203 | 80 | 0.556 |
| Fort Wayne Komets (EDM) | 72 | 35 | 30 | 3 | 4 | 224 | 226 | 77 | 0.535 |
| Cincinnati Cyclones (NYR) | 72 | 31 | 34 | 7 | 0 | 236 | 261 | 69 | 0.479 |
| Iowa Heartlanders (MIN) | 72 | 27 | 37 | 6 | 2 | 186 | 250 | 62 | 0.431 |

^{1} Flooding on the banks of the Ohio River in Wheeling, WV led to three home Wheeling Nailers games affected — the April 5 game versus Fort Wayne (which was made up April 10 because there was a playoff implication), the April 12 game versus Toledo (cancelled because there were no remaining playoff implications), and the April 13 game versus Cincinnati (moved to Cranberry Township, PA at the parent club's training facility, the University of Pittsburgh Medical Center Mario Lemieux Sports Complex. As a result, the ECHL calculated seeding by points percentage.

| Mountain Division | GP | W | L | OTL | SOL | GF | GA | Pts | Pts% |
|---|---|---|---|---|---|---|---|---|---|
| z – Kansas City Mavericks (SEA) | 72 | 54 | 12 | 4 | 2 | 305 | 202 | 114 | 0.792 |
| x – Idaho Steelheads (DAL) | 72 | 48 | 20 | 2 | 2 | 303 | 242 | 100 | 0.694 |
| x – Allen Americans (OTT) | 72 | 33 | 35 | 3 | 1 | 233 | 276 | 70 | 0.486 |
| x – Tulsa Oilers (ANA) | 72 | 30 | 33 | 8 | 1 | 222 | 233 | 69 | 0.479 |
| Utah Grizzlies (COL) | 72 | 31 | 36 | 5 | 0 | 227 | 264 | 67 | 0.465 |
| Rapid City Rush (CGY) | 72 | 30 | 38 | 4 | 0 | 236 | 280 | 64 | 0.444 |
| Wichita Thunder (SJS) | 72 | 27 | 35 | 9 | 1 | 220 | 271 | 64 | 0.444 |

== Postseason ==
The top four teams in each division at the end of the regular season advanced to the 2024 Kelly Cup playoffs and were seeded one through four based on their end-of-season division ranking. Each round was a best-of-7 series with the winner advancing to the next round. The first two rounds were played between teams in their same division, with the first seed facing the fourth seed and the second seed facing the third seed. The winners of each division then played off to determine winners of each conference. In the final, the team from the Eastern Conference defeated the Western Conference Kansas City Mavericks in five games. It was the third consecutive championship for the Florida Everblades.

=== Bracket ===
Division Semifinals | Division Finals
N1 | Adirondack | 4
N4 | Maine | 3
N1 | Adirondack | 4
North Division
N2 | Norfolk | 2
N2 | Norfolk | 4
N3 | Trois-Rivières | 2
Eastern Conference
S1 | Greenville | 2
S4 | Orlando | 4
S4 | Orlando | 1
South Division
S3 | Florida | 4
S2 | Jacksonville | 3
S3 | Florida | 4
C1 | Toledo | 4
C4 | Kalamazoo | 0
C1 | Toledo | 4
Central Division
C3 | Wheeling | 0
C2 | Indy | 1
C3 | Wheeling | 4
Western Conference
M1 | Kansas City | 4
M4 | Tulsa | 0
M1 | Kansas City | 4
Mountain Division
M2 | Idaho | 1
M2 | Idaho | 4
M3 | Allen | 1

Conference Finals
N1 | Adirondack | 2
S3 | Florida | 4
C1 | Toledo | 2
M1 | Kansas City | 4

Kelly Cup Finals
S3 | Florida | 4
M1 | Kansas City | 1

== See also ==
- List of ECHL seasons
- 2023 in ice hockey
- 2024 in ice hockey
