= Ben Youds =

American ice hockey player

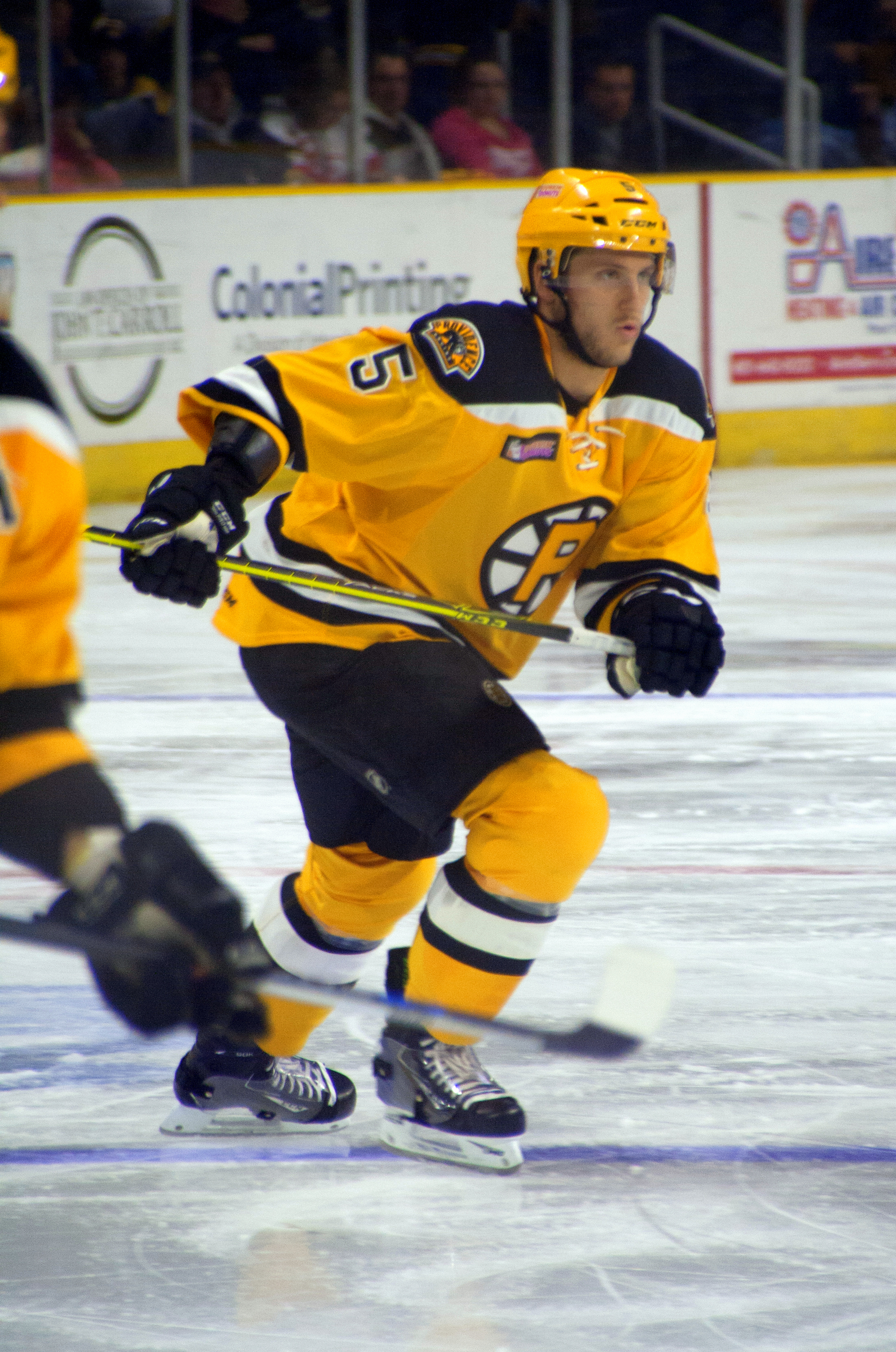
- Born: April 20, 1988 (age 38) Brooklyn Park, Minnesota, U.S.
- Height: 5 ft 11 in (180 cm)
- Weight: 180 lb (82 kg; 12 st 12 lb)
- Position: Defense
- Shoots: Right
- SHL team Former teams: IK Oskarshamn; Providence Bruins; Lake Erie Monsters; Leksands IF; Växjö Lakers; Rögle BK; Rockford IceHogs
- NHL draft: Undrafted
- Playing career: 2011–present

Ben Youds (born April 20, 1988) is an American professional ice hockey defenseman. He is currently playing with IK Oskarshamn in the Swedish Hockey League (SHL).

== Playing career ==
Youds attended Minnesota State University, Mankato where he played NCAA college hockey with the Minnesota State Mavericks men's ice hockey team. Undrafted on September 1, 2011, Youds signed his first professional contract with the Rockford IceHogs of the American Hockey League for the 2011–12 season.

After a successful first season with the Providence Bruins in the 2013–14 season, in which Youds established career highs of 20 points in 57 games, he was invited to the Boston Bruins 2014 training camp on September 18, 2014.

Youds was reassigned to Providence on September 26, a signed an AHL contract with the club for the 2014–15 season. Establishing a regular position on the Providence blueline, Youds had already eclipsed his career highs in goals and points before he was traded in consideration of an NHL transaction, to the Lake Erie Monsters on March 2, 2015. Youds closed out the season with the Monsters, immediately contributing with 3 goals and 11 points in 18 games.

As an un-signed free agent, on September 16, 2015, Youds was signed to a professional try-out contract to attend training camp in a return to the Boston Bruins organization. He was later signed to a one-year AHL contract with Providence.

Upon completing his fifth North American season, Youds opted to pursue a European career in signing a one-year deal with Swedish club, Leksands IF of the SHL on May 23, 2016. In his lone season with Leksands in 2016–17, Youds established himself in a top-four role and contributed with 4 goals and 17 points in 44 games, however was unable to prevent Leksands from relegation.

In early July 2017, he inked a one-year contract with fellow SHL side Växjö Lakers. He appeared in 8 games with the Lakers to begin the 2017–18 season, however through limited playing time he opted to leave the club and join fellow SHL club, Rögle BK, on November 25, 2017. In an expanded role with BK, Youds featured in 32 games and contributed with 16 points, earning a one-year extension.

In the following 2018–19 season, Youds was limited to just 12 games with Rögle BK through injury. He left the club at the conclusion of his contract with club at seasons end.

As a free agent, Youds left Sweden after four seasons and returned to North America, agreeing to continue his career by signing a contract for the 2019–20 season with the Indy Fuel of the ECHL on October 15, 2019. He later returned to the AHL after securing a loan with the Fuel affiliate, the Rockford IceHogs. After appearing in 17 contests with 7 assists for the IceHogs, Youds left the club to return to Sweden for the remainder of the season, signing with IK Oskarshamn of the SHL on February 9, 2020.

== Career statistics ==
			Regular season					Playoffs
Season	Team	League	GP	G	A	Pts	PIM	GP	G	A	Pts	PIM
2005–06	Shattuck-Saint Mary's	MNHS	59	4	20	24	126	—	—	—	—	—
2006–07	Shattuck-Saint Mary's	MNHS	61	10	32	42	131	—	—	—	—	—
2007–08	Minnesota State University, Mankato	WCHA	37	1	11	12	53	—	—	—	—	—
2008–09	Minnesota State University, Mankato	WCHA	32	0	8	8	45	—	—	—	—	—
2009–10	Minnesota State University, Mankato	WCHA	39	3	23	26	38	—	—	—	—	—
2010–11	Minnesota State University, Mankato	WCHA	37	7	14	21	48	—	—	—	—	—
2011–12	Rockford IceHogs	AHL	57	4	13	17	60	—	—	—	—	—
2011–12	Toledo Walleye	ECHL	1	1	0	1	0	—	—	—	—	—
2012–13	Rockford IceHogs	AHL	23	1	8	9	22	—	—	—	—	—
2012–13	Toledo Walleye	ECHL	43	7	27	34	47	4	0	1	1	6
2013–14	Providence Bruins	AHL	57	2	18	20	30	1	0	0	0	2
2014–15	Providence Bruins	AHL	47	5	16	21	25	—	—	—	—	—
2014–15	Lake Erie Monsters	AHL	18	3	8	11	10	—	—	—	—	—
2015–16	Providence Bruins	AHL	50	5	17	22	39	3	0	0	0	2
2016–17	Leksands IF	SHL	44	3	14	17	24	—	—	—	—	—
2017–18	Växjö Lakers	SHL	8	0	3	3	6	—	—	—	—	—
2017–18	Rögle BK	SHL	32	1	15	16	20	—	—	—	—	—
2018–19	Rögle BK	SHL	12	0	0	0	22	—	—	—	—	—
2019–20	Indy Fuel	ECHL	13	1	5	6	10	—	—	—	—	—
2019–20	Rockford IceHogs	AHL	17	0	7	7	14	—	—	—	—	—
AHL totals			269	20	87	107	200	4	0	0	0	4

== Awards and honors ==
Award	Year
College
WCHA All-Academic Team	2009, 2010, 2011
ECHL
All-Star Game	2013
