= ECHL awards =

North American minor ice hockey league awards

The ECHL presents numerous annual awards to recognize its teams, players, front office staff, and media contributors. The first awards were given out in recognition of the achievements of the league's teams and players in the league's inaugural season of 1989 and included the Jack Riley Cup and Brabham Cup awarded to the league's teams and the Most Valuable Player, Playoffs Most Valuable Player, Rookie of the Year, Defenseman of the Year, Coach of the Year, and Leading Scorer awards to the league's players. The league has added many other awards since the league's inception including, the Goaltender of the Year award in 1994, the Sportsmanship Award in 1997, separate titles for each of its conference playoff champions in 1998, and the Plus Performer Award in 2000.

== Team trophies ==
Award	Created	Description	Current holder
Patrick J. Kelly Cup	1989	Awarded to the ECHL playoff champion since 1989. Replaced the Riley Cup that was awarded for the playoff championship from 1988 to 1996.	Florida Everblades (2024)
E.A. "Bud" Gingher Trophy	1998	Awarded to the Eastern Conference playoff champion, since 2005. Previously awarded to the Northern Conference playoff champion from 1998 to 2005	Florida Everblades (2024)
Bruce Taylor Trophy	1998	Awarded to the Western Conference playoff champion, since 2005. Previously the Bruce Taylor Trophy (then the Taylor Trophy) was awarded to the playoff champion of the West Coast Hockey League until the league was absorbed by the ECHL in 2003. The Bruce Taylor Trophy has also been tagged as the trophy awarded to the Southern Conference playoff champion from 1998 to 2005. It is named in recognition of British Columbia businessman Bruce Taylor, founder of the Western Coast Hockey League.	Kansas City Mavericks (2024)
Brabham Cup	1989	Awarded to the club finishing the regular season with the best overall record (based on points)	South Carolina Stingrays (2025)

== Individual trophies and awards ==
Award	Created	Description	Current holder
Most Valuable Player	1989	Awarded to the player adjudged to be the most valuable to his team as voted by the coaches of each team in the ECHL.	Brandon Hawkins; Toledo Walleye (2025)
June M. Kelly Award	1989	Awarded to the most valuable player for his team in the playoffs as selected by members of the media at the conclusion of the final game of the Kelly Cup playoffs.	Oliver Chau; Florida Everblades (2024)
John Brophy Award	1989	Awarded to the ECHL coach adjudged to have contributed the most to his team's success as voted by the coaches of each of the ECHL teams.	Andrew Lord; Greenville Swamp Rabbits (2024)
Nick Vitucci Award	1994	Awarded to the goaltender adjudged to be the best at his position as voted by the coaches of each team in the ECHL.	Cam Johnson; Florida Everblades (2025)
John A. Daley Memorial Trophy	1989	Awarded to the player selected as the most proficient in his first year of competition in the ECHL as voted by the coaches of each of the ECHL teams.	Sloan Stanick; Tahoe Knight Monsters (2025)
Defenseman of the Year	1989	Awarded to the defenseman who demonstrates throughout the season the greatest ability at the position as voted by the coaches of each of the ECHL teams.	Kyle Mayhew; Fort Wayne Komets (2025)
Leading Scorer	1989	Awarded to the player who leads the league in scoring at the end of the regular season.	Brandon Hawkins; Toledo Walleye (2025)
Plus Performer of the Year	2000	Awarded to the player who leads the league in plus/minus rating at the end of the regular season.	Cade Borchardt; Kansas City Mavericks (2025)
ECHL Sportsmanship Award	1997	Awarded to the player adjudged to have exhibited the best type of sportsmanship and gentlemanly conduct combined with a high standard of playing ability as voted by the coaches of each of the ECHL teams.	Peter Bates; Wichita Thunder (2025)
Community Service Award	2011	Awarded to a player who goes above and beyond in his efforts for community and charitable causes.	Todd Skirving; Reading Royals (2025)

== Staff and miscellaneous awards ==
Award	Created	Description	Current holder
Hockey Ops Dept. of the Year	2016	Awarded annually to the top hockey operations department in the League, as determined in a vote of ECHL coaches. From 2016–2021 this award was presented to an individual as the ECHL General Manager of the Year.	Toledo Walleye (2025)
Executive of the Year	1993	The Executive of the Year is determined in a vote of the ECHL Board of Governors.	Jeff Mead; Adirondack Thunder (2024)
Joe Babik Award	1997	Also known as the PR/Media Relations Director of Year, this award is determined in a vote of the ECHL media relations directors and broadcasters.	Cam McGuire; Idaho Steelheads (2025)
Broadcaster of the Year	2002	The PR/Broadcaster of the Year (previously known as Broadcaster of the Year until 2019) is determined in a vote of the ECHL broadcasters and media relations directors.	David Fine; Iowa Heartlanders (2025)
Marketing Award	1997	The Marketing Award (previously known as the Excellence In Marketing Award) is presented annually to the team marketing department "adjudged to be the best in the league" as determined by outside expert judges.	Orlando Solar Bears (2024)
Overall Award of Excellence	2004	The Overall Award of Excellence will be presented by the league office to teams that are first-rate, cooperative with the league office, compliant with league programs and who distinguish themselves on and off the ice and in the community.	Florida Everblades/Savannah Ghost Pirates (2024)
Ticket Department of the Year	2003	The ECHL Ticket Department of the Year is determined in a vote of ECHL teams, for both aggregate season sales and year-over-year growth.	Savannah Ghost Pirates (Aggregate) (2024); Adirondack Thunder (Year-over-Year) (2024)
Ryan Birmingham Memorial Award	2008	Awarded to an on-ice official for his contributions and dedication to the league officiating staff and is determined in voting of ECHL On-Ice Officials. It is named in honor of ECHL linesman Ryan Birmingham, who was killed in an automobile accident in May 2007.	Chuck Schamel (2024)
Equipment Manager of the Year	2003	The Equipment Manager of the Year Award is determined in a vote of ECHL equipment managers.	Skylar Garver; Fort Wayne Komets (2025)
Athletic Trainer of the Year	2008	The Sports Health Athletic Trainer of the Year Award is determined in a vote of ECHL athletic trainers.	Nick Potter; Kansas City Mavericks (2025)
Outstanding Media	2003	The Outstanding Media Award was determined in a vote of the ECHL media members, broadcasters, and media relations directors. It has not been awarded since 2019.	Jordan Strack, WTOL; Toledo Walleye (2019)
Website of the Year	2005	The ECHL Web Site of the Year Award was presented annually to the team whose web site is adjudged to be the best in the league as determined by outside expert judges. It has not been awarded since 2018.	Allen Americans (2018)
Social Media Excellence	2016	The Social Media Award of Excellence was presented to an ECHL Mclub who has exemplified the use of social media in the following categories: scope of team reach (how many forms of social media does the team utilize and number of followers), creative social content/campaigns, use of social media to achieve business goals and active engagement with fans. It has not been awarded since 2018.	Indy Fuel (2018)

== Gallery ==
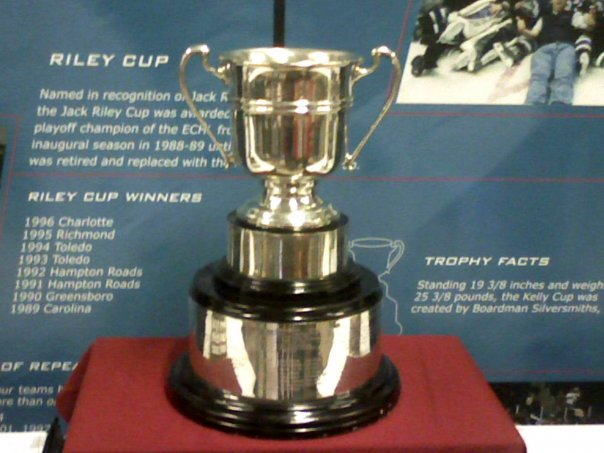
The Kelly Cup

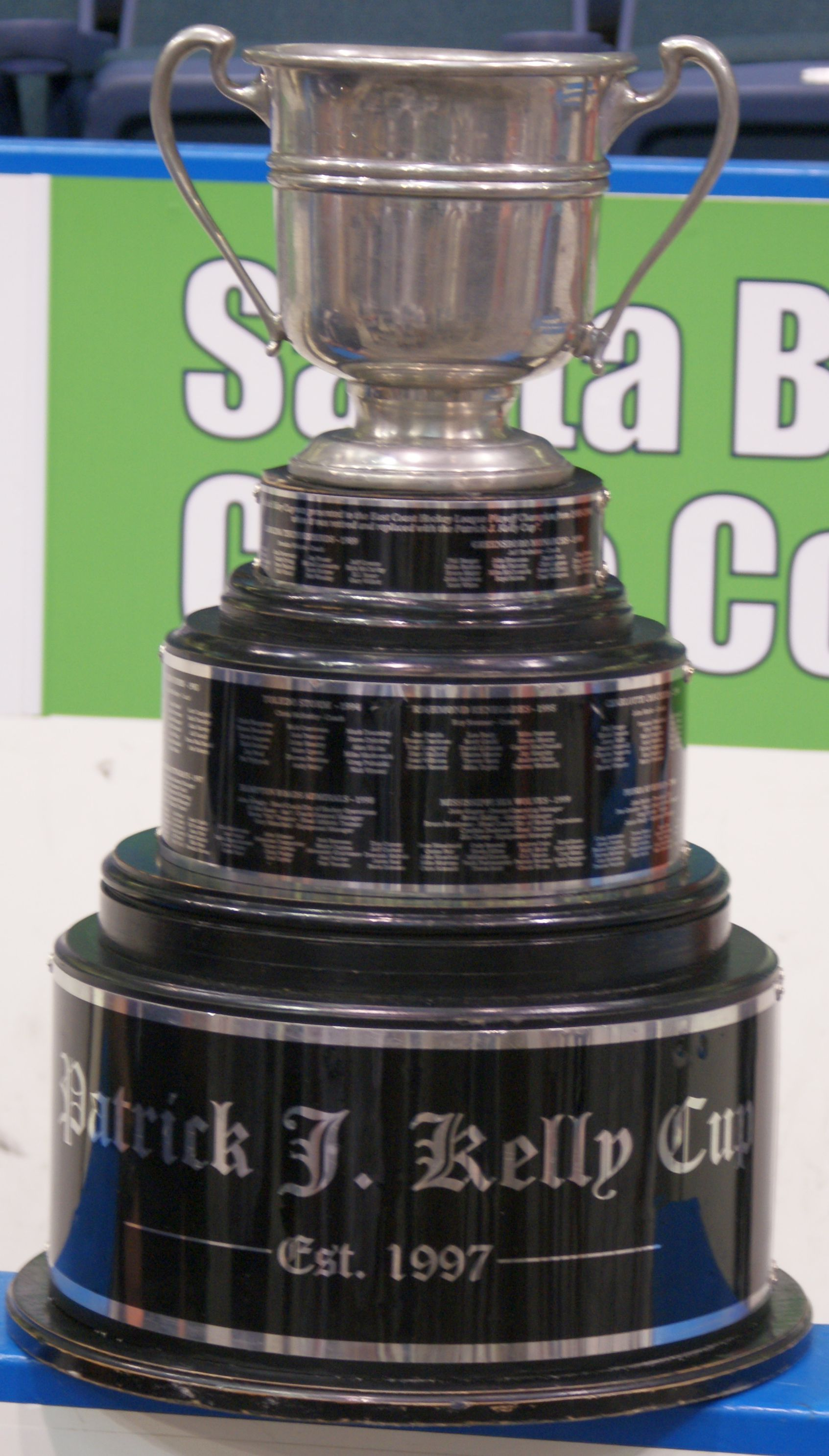
The Kelly Cup, with one more base level

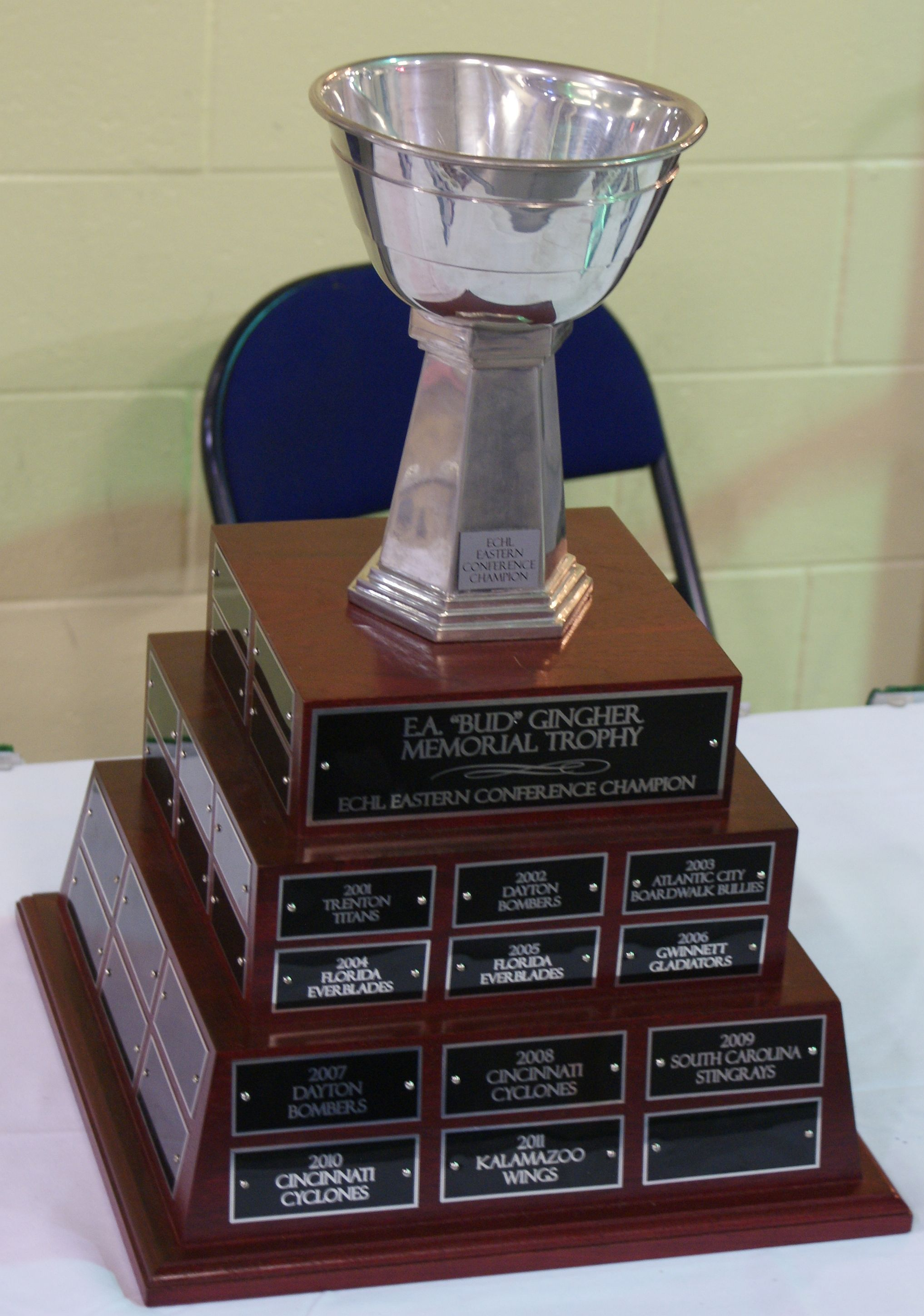
The Gingher Memorial Trophy

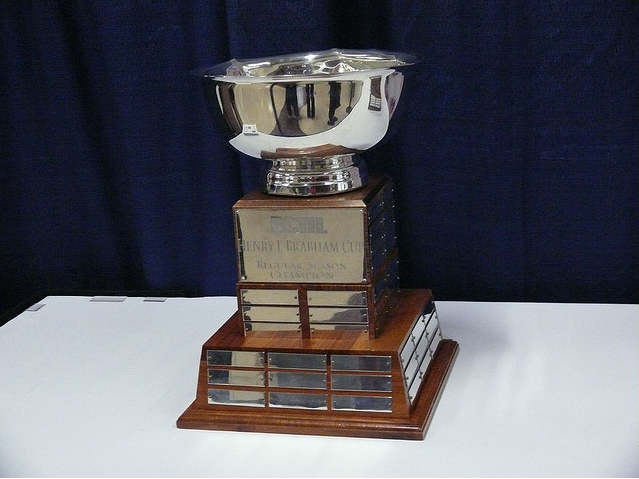
The Brabham Cup

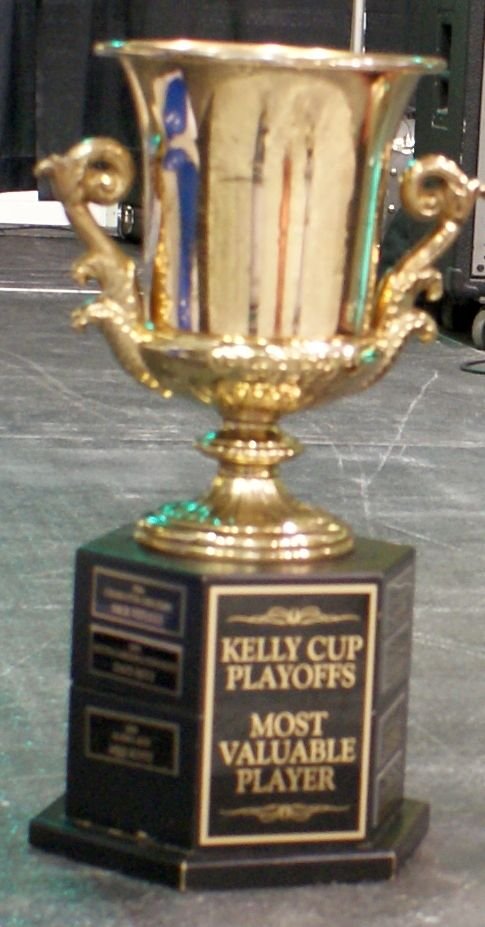
The Kelly Cup MVP Trophy

== See also ==
- ECHL
