= Ben Street (ice hockey) =

Canadian ice hockey player (born 1987)

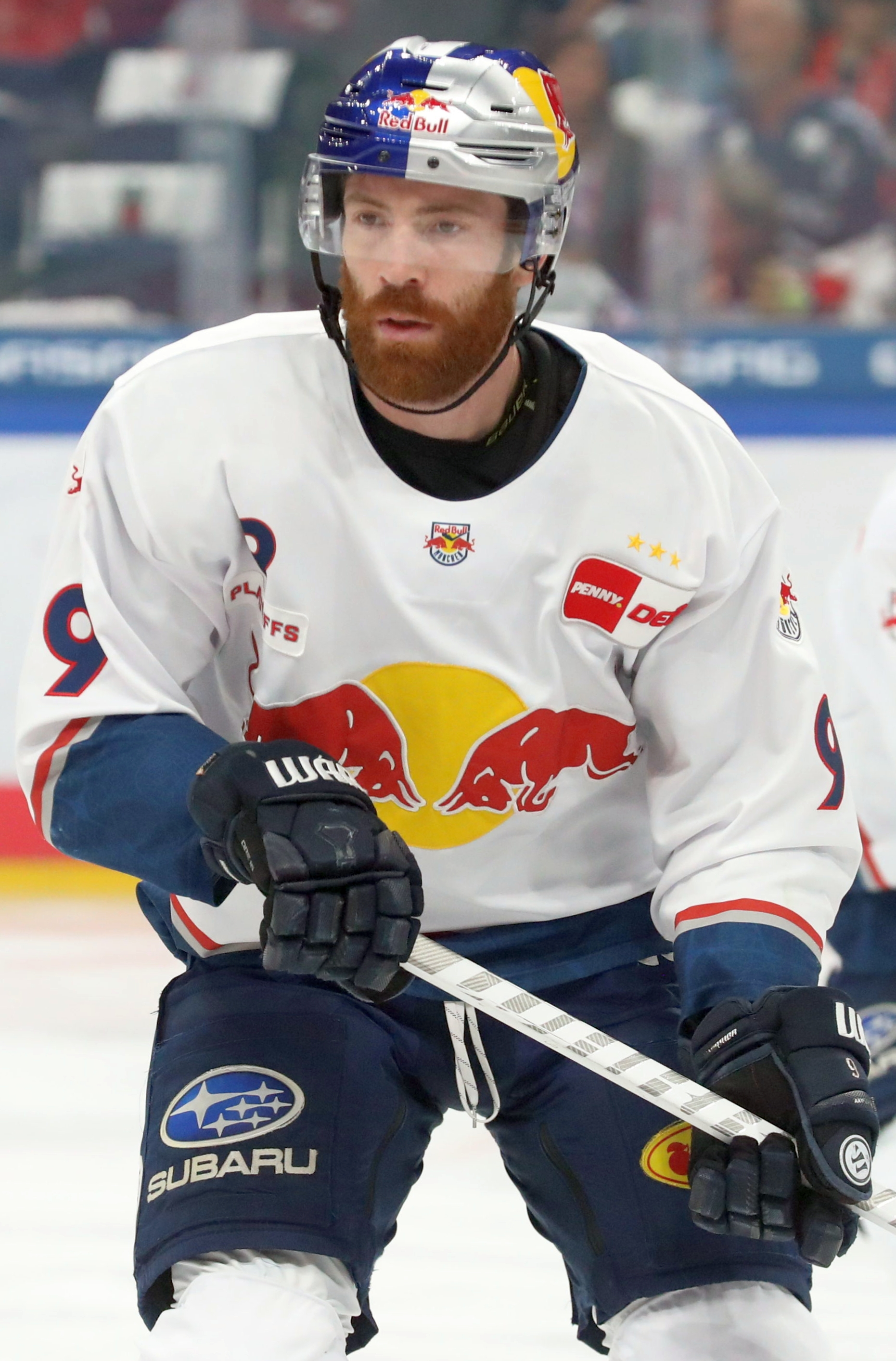
- Street with Munich in 2022
- Born: February 13, 1987 (age 39) Coquitlam, British Columbia, Canada
- Height: 6 ft 0 in (183 cm)
- Weight: 196 lb (89 kg; 14 st 0 lb)
- Position: Centre
- Shot: Left
- team Former teams: Free agent Calgary Flames; Colorado Avalanche; Detroit Red Wings; Anaheim Ducks; New Jersey Devils; EHC München
- National team: Canada
- NHL draft: Undrafted
- Playing career: 2010–2024

Benjamin Street (born February 13, 1987) is a retired former Canadian professional ice hockey forward. He most recently played for EHC Red Bull München of the Deutsche Eishockey Liga (DEL). An undrafted player, Street played five seasons of college hockey with the Wisconsin Badgers before turning professional in 2010. He joined the Calgary Flames organization in 2012 before signing with the Colorado Avalanche in 2014. He has also played with the Detroit Red Wings, Anaheim Ducks and New Jersey Devils.

== Playing career ==
As a youth, Street played in the 2000 and 2001 Quebec International Pee-Wee Hockey Tournaments with a minor ice hockey team from Burnaby.

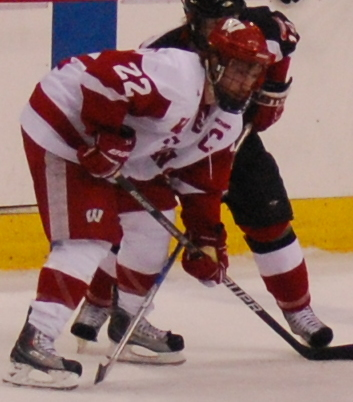
Street playing for the Wisconsin Badgers in the 2010 NCAA Division I Men's Ice Hockey West Regional Final

Street played his junior hockey with the Salmon Arm Silverbacks of the British Columbia Hockey League. After two seasons there, he joined the Wisconsin Badgers men's ice hockey program in 2005. He played 171 games for the Badgers between 2005 and 2010, scoring 47 goals and recording 94 points. Street was a member of the Badgers' 2006 national championship team, and shared the team's captaincy in his junior and senior seasons. He was named to numerous academic All-Conference teams. Street was named the recipient of Wisconsin's Ivan B. Williamson Scholastic Award in 2009–10, and to both the Academic All-Big Ten and Western Collegiate Hockey Association (WCHA) All-Academic teams for four consecutive years between 2007 and 2010.

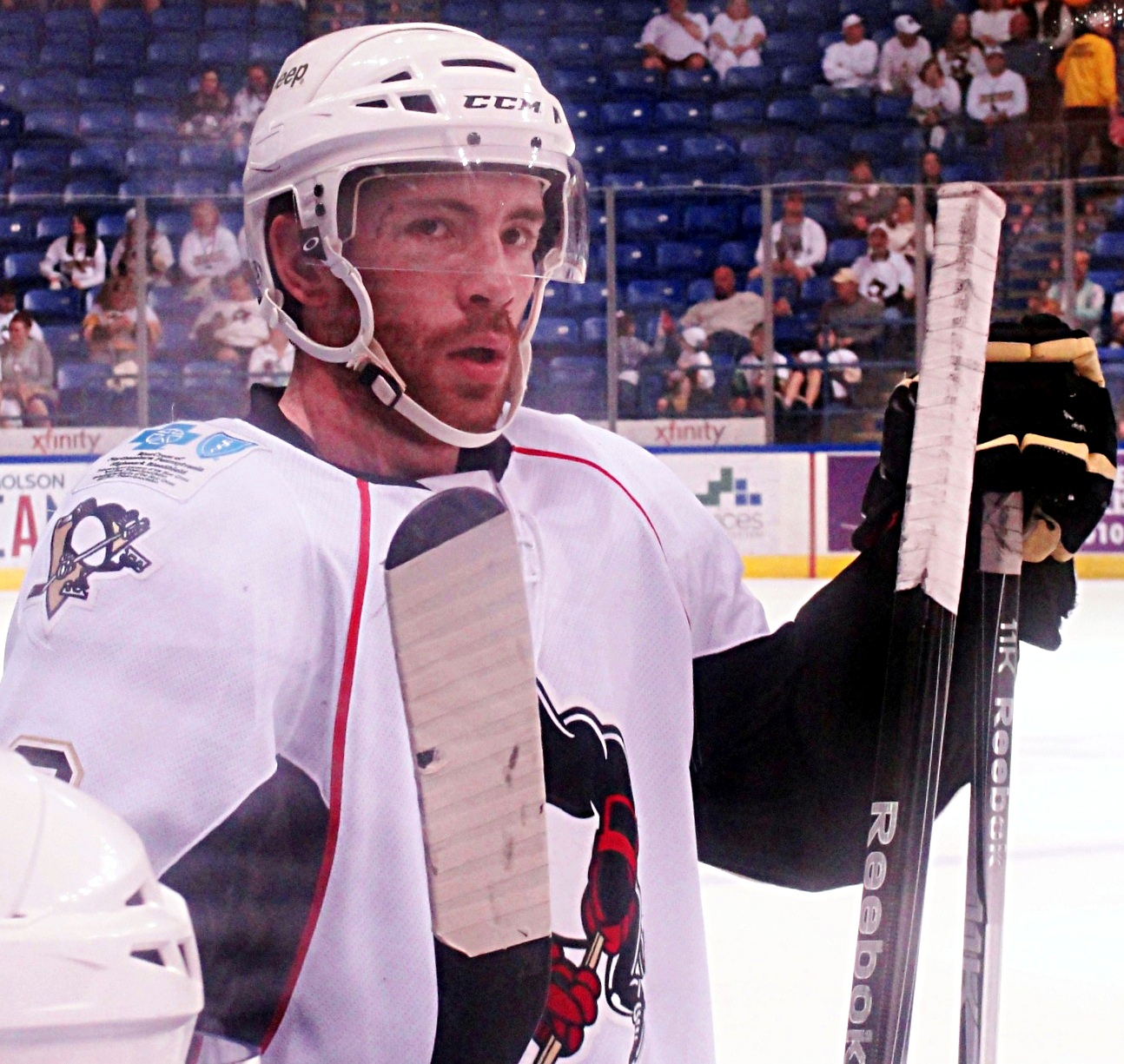
Street as a member of the Wilkes-Barre/Scranton Penguins during the 2012 Calder Cup playoffs

The five-foot-eleven, 185-pound Street went unselected in an NHL entry draft, but his work ethic with the Badgers helped him earn a professional contract in the Pittsburgh Penguins organization in 2010. He was assigned to the Wheeling Nailers of the ECHL to begin the 2010–11 season where he posted 24 goals and 51 points in just 38 games. His performance earned him a promotion to the American Hockey League (AHL)'s Wilkes-Barre/Scranton Penguins mid-season after injuries in Pittsburgh led to roster openings for the AHL squad. Street finished the season in the AHL, scoring 23 points in 36 games and appearing in the Calder Cup playoffs with the team. Despite playing only half of the ECHL season, Street was voted that league's Rookie of the Year. He returned to the Wilkes-Barre-Scranton Penguins in 2011–12 on an AHL contract, where he had 57 points in 71 games.

Street's chances of reaching the NHL with the Penguins were limited, as Pittsburgh already had several top centres, so he chose to leave the organization as a free agent. He chose to sign with the Calgary Flames, a team with less depth at the position. The contract was his first NHL deal, a two-year, two-way contract that would pay him $575,000 if he played in the NHL, and $105,000 in the AHL. Street began the season in the AHL with the Abbotsford Heat, but sought to impress the Flames' coaching staff during the NHL's mini-training camp following the 2012–13 NHL lockout. Street was leading the Heat in scoring with 31 points in 44 games when an injury to Mikael Backlund led to his recall to the Calgary Flames on February 8, 2013. He made his NHL debut the following night in a 5–1 loss to the Vancouver Canucks.

On November 1, 2012, Street and Abbotsford Heat teammate, Steve McCarthy, set an AHL record for the fastest two successive goals scored. McCarthy beat Toronto Marlies goaltender, Ben Scrivens on a short handed opportunity four minutes and twenty-eight seconds into the third period. Street shot the puck immediately off the following face off, scoring another short handed goal. The two goals were officially recorded three seconds apart.

On July 1, 2014, Street left the Flames and signed as a free agent to a two-year contract with the Colorado Avalanche. In his first season with Colorado, Street suffered an injury in the Avalanche's pre-season which delayed his start to the 2014–15 season. After returning to health he was assigned to begin with AHL affiliate, the Lake Erie Monsters. Having appeared in just four games with the Monsters, he was recalled by the Avalanche on November 21, 2014. He made his Avalanche debut on November 22, 2014, in a 4-3 victory over the Carolina Hurricanes. Street would appear in three scoreless games with the Avalanche over the season before he was returned to the Monsters to make a late season push for the playoffs to finish with 39 points in 44 games.

After his second training camp with the Avalanche, Street was assigned to a new Avalanche AHL affiliate, the San Antonio Rampage, to begin the 2015–16 season on September 27, 2015. As the club's first line scoring center, Street was announced as team captain three games into the campaign on October 22, 2015.

On July 1, 2016, Street signed a one-year contract with the Detroit Red Wings. On March 21, 2017, Street was recalled by the Red Wings. Before being recalled, Street recorded 23 goals and 28 assists in 57 games with the Grand Rapids Griffins. Following the conclusion of the Red Wings season, Street was assigned to the Griffins. Street appeared in six games for the Red Wings, recording one assist and eight shots on goal while averaging 8:15 time on ice. During the 2017 Calder Cup playoffs, he ranked second on Grand Rapids and fourth in the AHL in postseason scoring, registering eight goals and 13 assists in 19 games. On June 27, 2017, Street signed a one-year contract extension with the Red Wings. During the 2017–18 season, Street was the Griffins leading scorer, recording 21 goals and 44 assists in 73 regular season games. His 44 assists ranked third in the league, while his 65 points ranked fifth in the league in scoring. During the 2018 Calder Cup playoffs, he was the Griffins leading scorer, recording four goals and four assists in five games.

Street left the Red Wings as a free agent after two seasons to sign a one-year, $750,000 contract with the Anaheim Ducks on July 2, 2018. With the Ducks plagued by injuries, Street made the opening night roster for the 2018–19 season. Street enjoyed his most productive season in the NHL, posting 3 goals and 5 points in a season-best 21 games before he was placed on waivers and re-assigned to AHL affiliate, the San Diego Gulls, for the remainder of the campaign. He continued his career scoring pace in the AHL, posting 26 points in just 32 games, helping the Gulls advance to the Western Conference finals in the 2019 Calder Cup playoffs.

On July 1, 2019, Street signed as a free agent, agreeing to a one-year, two-way contract with his fifth NHL team, the New Jersey Devils.

Following his 11th professional season, having played exclusively in North America, Street opted to pursue a European career by agreeing to a one-year contract with German club, EHC Red Bull München of the Deutsche Eishockey Liga (DEL), on August 2, 2021.

== International play ==
In January 2022, Street was selected to play for Team Canada at the 2022 Winter Olympics.

== Career statistics ==
=== Regular season and playoffs ===
			Regular season					Playoffs
Season	Team	League	GP	G	A	Pts	PIM	GP	G	A	Pts	PIM
2003–04	Salmon Arm Silverbacks	BCHL	54	13	21	34	14	13	1	9	10	0
2004–05	Salmon Arm Silverbacks	BCHL	56	29	39	68	21	11	7	8	15	0
2005–06	Wisconsin Badgers	WCHA	43	10	5	15	0	—	—	—	—	—
2006–07	Wisconsin Badgers	WCHA	41	10	7	17	16	—	—	—	—	—
2007–08	Wisconsin Badgers	WCHA	40	13	17	30	38	—	—	—	—	—
2008–09	Wisconsin Badgers	WCHA	4	1	0	1	8	—	—	—	—	—
2009–10	Wisconsin Badgers	WCHA	43	14	16	30	30	—	—	—	—	—
2010–11	Wheeling Nailers	ECHL	38	24	27	51	10	—	—	—	—	—
2010–11	Wilkes–Barre/Scranton Penguins	AHL	36	12	11	23	8	9	8	0	1	1
2011–12	Wilkes–Barre/Scranton Penguins	AHL	71	27	30	57	24	12	1	2	3	2
2012–13	Abbotsford Heat	AHL	69	15	22	37	22	—	—	—	—	—
2012–13	Calgary Flames	NHL	6	0	1	1	0	—	—	—	—	—
2013–14	Calgary Flames	NHL	13	0	1	1	4	—	—	—	—	—
2013–14	Abbotsford Heat	AHL	58	28	32	60	24	4	0	1	1	2
2014–15	Lake Erie Monsters	AHL	44	9	30	39	10	—	—	—	—	—
2014–15	Colorado Avalanche	NHL	3	0	0	0	0	—	—	—	—	—
2015–16	San Antonio Rampage	AHL	15	7	14	21	4	—	—	—	—	—
2015–16	Colorado Avalanche	NHL	7	0	0	0	4	—	—	—	—	—
2016–17	Grand Rapids Griffins	AHL	62	25	30	55	16	19	8	13	21	2
2016–17	Detroit Red Wings	NHL	6	0	1	1	0	—	—	—	—	—
2017–18	Grand Rapids Griffins	AHL	73	21	44	65	22	5	4	4	8	6
2018–19	Anaheim Ducks	NHL	21	3	2	5	2	—	—	—	—	—
2018–19	San Diego Gulls	AHL	32	9	17	26	6	16	2	9	11	2
2019–20	Binghamton Devils	AHL	49	15	27	42	20	—	—	—	—	—
2019–20	New Jersey Devils	NHL	3	0	1	1	0	—	—	—	—	—
2020–21	Binghamton Devils	AHL	14	5	9	14	2	—	—	—	—	—
2021–22	EHC München	DEL	49	18	28	46	20	11	1	4	5	2
2022–23	EHC München	DEL	43	10	17	27	6	18	2	15	17	0
2023–24	EHC München	DEL	32	6	15	21	13	9	1	3	4	2
AHL totals			523	173	266	439	158	64	15	30	45	14
NHL totals			59	3	6	9	10	—	—	—	—	—

=== International ===
Year	Team	Event	Result	GP	G	A	Pts	PIM
2004	Canada Pacific	U17	2nd place, silver medalist(s)	6	1	5	6	4
2022	Canada	OG	6th	4	2	1	3	2
Junior totals				6	1	5	6	4
Senior totals				4	2	1	3	2

== Awards and honours ==
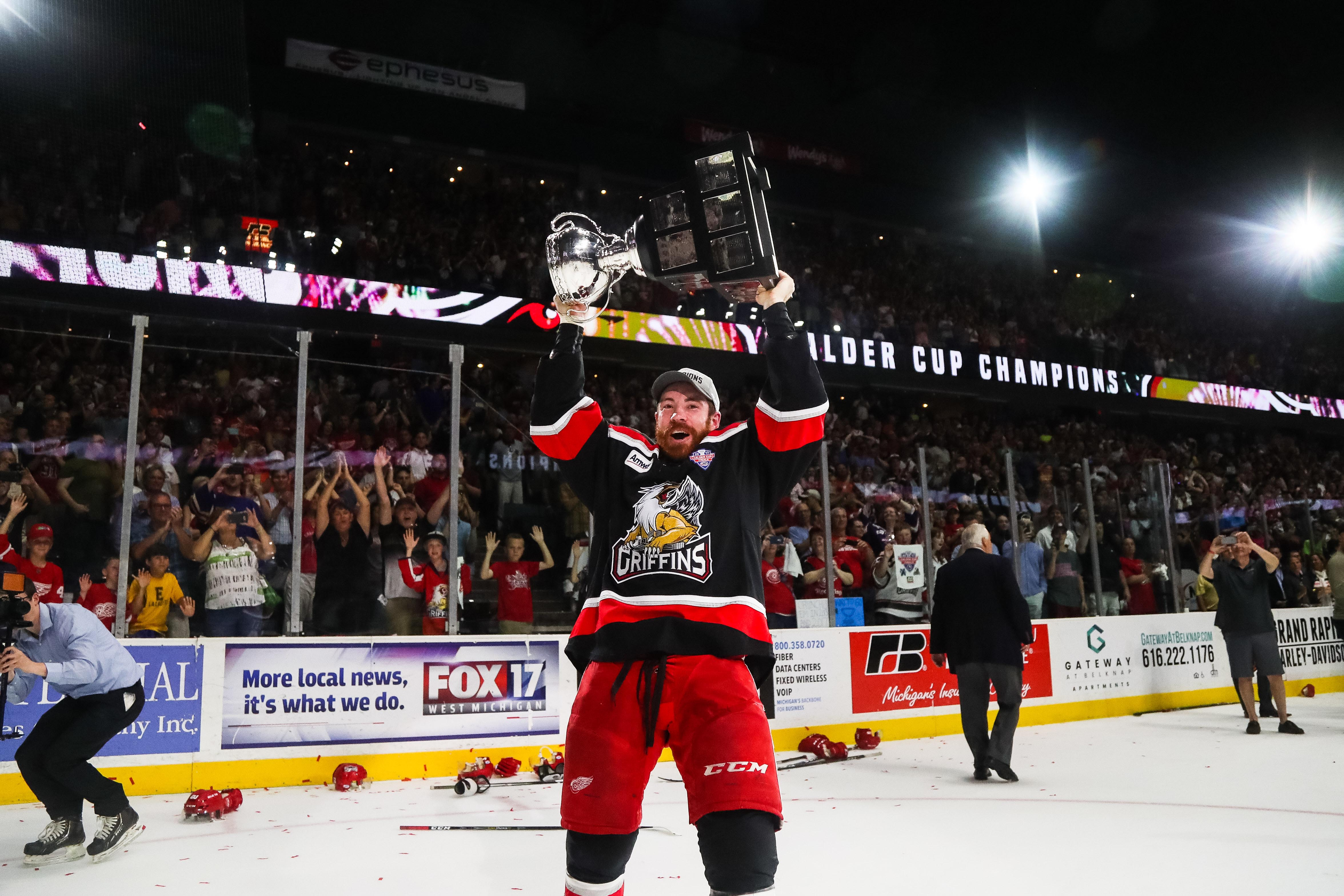
Street hoisting the Calder Cup in 2017.

Award	Year
College
WCHA All-Academic Team	2009, 2010
ECHL
All-Star Classic	2011
All-Rookie Team	2011
John A. Daley Trophy	2011
AHL
All-Star Game	2014
Calder Cup	2017
