= Toledo Walleye =

Minor league ice hockey team in Ohio, United States

- City: Toledo, Ohio
- League: ECHL
- Conference: Western
- Division: Central
- Founded: 1991
- Home arena: Huntington Center (Toledo, Ohio)
- Colors: Powder blue, navy blue, gold, white
- Owner: Toledo Arena Sports Inc.
- General manager: Neil Neukam
- Head coach: Pat Mikesch
- Media: BCSN; WCWA (1230 AM); Toledo Blade
- Affiliates: Detroit Red Wings (NHL); Grand Rapids Griffins (AHL)
- Website: www.toledowalleye.com

Franchise history
- 1991–2007: Toledo Storm
- 2009–present: Toledo Walleye

Championships
- Regular season titles: 3 (2014–15, 2016–17, 2021–22)
- Division titles: 7 (2014–15, 2015–16, 2016–17, 2017–18), 2021–22, 2023–24, 2024–25)
- Conference titles: 3 (2018–19, 2021–22, 2024–25)

The Toledo Walleye are a professional ice hockey team based in Toledo, Ohio. The Walleye are members of the Central Division of the Western Conference of the ECHL. The Walleye were founded in 1991 as the Toledo Storm and play their home games at the Huntington Center, which opened in 2009. Since the beginning of the 2009–10 season, the team has been affiliated with the Detroit Red Wings of the National Hockey League and the Grand Rapids Griffins of the American Hockey League with an agreement in place through the 2026–27 season. The team's geographic proximity to Detroit makes them one of the most cohesive development pipelines in premier minor league hockey.

== History ==
=== Toledo Storm (1991–2007) ===
The Walleye were founded in 1991 as the Toledo Storm, playing their home games at Toledo Sports Arena across the river from downtown Toledo. The Storm were the first hockey team to play in Toledo since the International Hockey League's Toledo Goaldiggers suspended operations in 1986, eventually moving to Kansas City in 1990. In the Storm's inaugural season, the team won the West Division title and the Henry Brabham Cup after posting the league's best record in the regular season. The following year the Storm won its first Jack Riley Cup, defeating the Wheeling Thunderbirds in six games. The Storm came back the following season and won its second Riley Cup, defeating the Raleigh Icecaps in five games, becoming only the second team in league history to win back-to-back league titles (the first being the Hampton Roads Admirals in 1991 and 1992). The Storm were dominant in its first few years, winning four division titles in their first five seasons and posting a winning record in thirteen of the sixteen seasons the team played. The Storm won its second Brabham Cup in 2003 and made the American Conference finals during the 2005–06 season, ultimately losing to the Gwinnett Gladiators in five games. The Storm's final game came on April 19, 2007, during the 2007 North Division semifinals losing to in-state rival, Cincinnati Cyclones by a score of 4–0 getting swept in the series 3 games to 0. In sixteen seasons in the ECHL, the Storm posted a 610-395-103 record, winning two Riley Cups, two Brabham Cups and six division titles.

=== Sale to Toledo Arena Sports and Two Year Suspension ===
In 2007, Toledo Arena Sports, Inc., an Ohio-Not-For-Profit Corporation, purchased the rights to the Toledo, Ohio Territory from the ECHL. The new ownership group was planning to build a new state-of-the-art arena in downtown Toledo to replace the aging Sports Arena. Shortly after the sale, Toledo Arena Sports announced that after the 2006–07 season, the Storm would not compete again until the arena was completed and the ECHL granted the Storm a two-year voluntary suspension from competition.

In February 2008, General Manager Joe Napoli announced that former Storm goaltender, ECHL Hall of Famer, and head coach from 2003 to 2007, Nick Vitucci would return to coach the franchise when it returned to the ice in 2009. One week after announcing Vitucci as head coach, Toledo Arena Sports Inc. renamed the Storm the "Walleye," in reference to the popular game fish that is abundant in the area.

=== Toledo Walleye (2009) ===
Inaugural season logo promoting Opening Weekend, 2009

At the ECHL Mid-Season Board of Governors meeting, the league announced that the Walleye would be members of the American Conference's North Division along with the Cincinnati Cyclones, Elmira Jackals, Johnstown Chiefs, Wheeling Nailers and Kalamazoo Wings. During the NHL's award ceremonies in Las Vegas, Detroit Red Wings general manager Ken Holland stated that the Walleye would become Detroit's ECHL affiliate for the 2009–10 season and that the Wings would send one of their three goaltender prospects (either Jordan Pearce, Thomas McCollum or Daniel Larsson) to Toledo for the season. On August 5, 2009, the Walleye announced a second affiliation agreement, becoming the ECHL affiliate of the Chicago Blackhawks and Chicago's AHL affiliate the Rockford IceHogs.

Alternate logo

The Walleye opened their inaugural season on October 16, 2009, hosting the defending Brabham Cup champion Florida Everblades in the first of a three-game series. Prior to the Walleye's home opener, head coach Nick Vitucci named defenseman Ryan Stokes as the team's captain. Despite a strong effort, the Walleye dropped their opener to Florida 1–2 in front of a sell-out crowd of 8,000, the largest crowd to ever watch a pro hockey game in Toledo at the time. The Walleye would return the next night and rookie goaltender Jordan Pearce would stop 35 of 37 shots faced as the Walleye scored three goals in the final period to get past the Everblades for the team's first win, 5–2. On December 31, defenseman J.C. Sawyer and forward Maxime Tanguay were selected to the American Conference All-Star team and played at the All-Star Game at the Citizens Business Bank Arena in Ontario, California on January 20. Sawyer was named the captain of the American Conference All-Stars. At the end of the regular season, defenseman J.C. Sawyer was named as a First Team selection to the All-ECHL team and won the Defenseman of the Year award, while center Maxime Tanguay was named to the All-Rookie team. The Walleye would finish the regular season in eighth place in the American Conference leading to a matchup with the American Conference regular season champions, the Charlotte Checkers. Toledo, behind a hat trick from winger Adam Keefe, claimed a 7–2 victory over top-seeded Charlotte in game one of the series, the first playoff game win for the organization since game two of the 2006 American Conference Finals against the Gwinnett Gladiators. However, the Walleye would lose the next three games to Charlotte and were eliminated from the playoffs in four games.

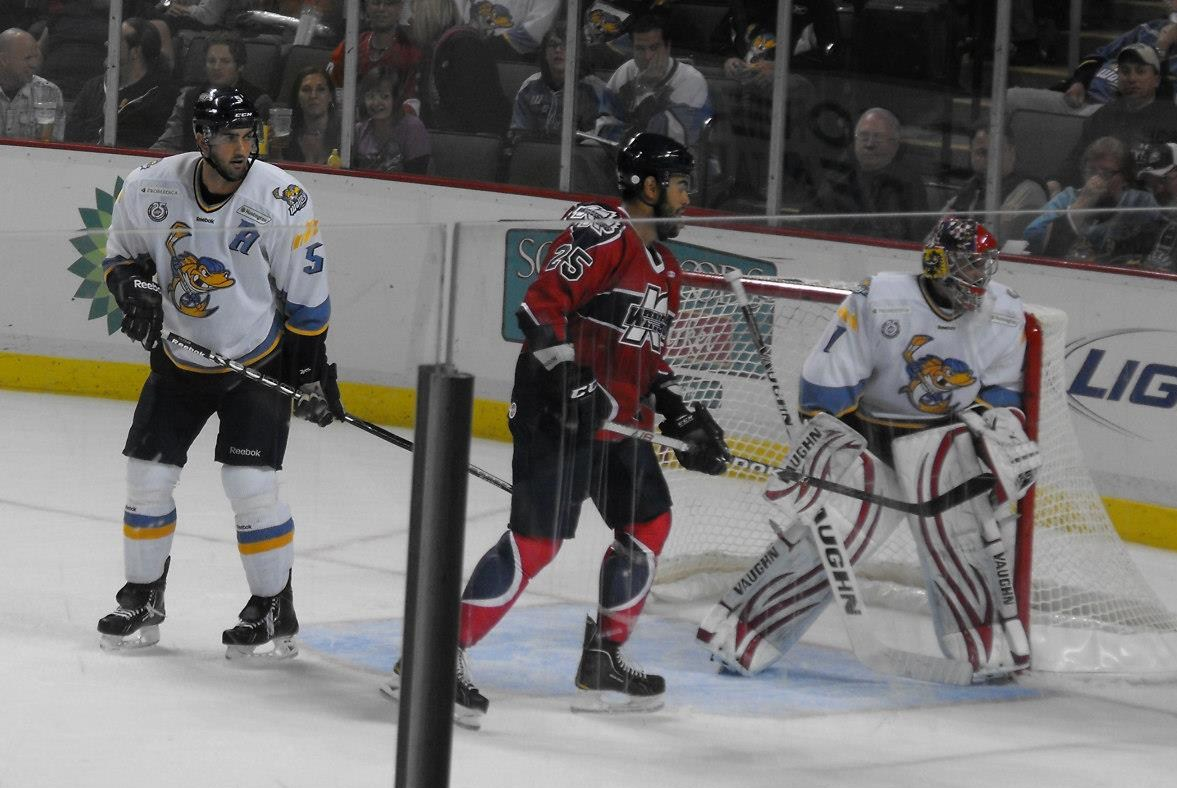
2012–13 home opener vs. Kalamazoo Wings.

=== Toledo Walleye (2020-present) ===
Due to the COVID-19 pandemic, the Walleye voluntarily suspended operations for the 2020–21 season. Coming back from the voluntary suspension, the Walleye would go on to win the Brabham Cup in the 2021–22 season, finishing with the league's best points % with.708, the only team above .700%. They would then go on to win in comeback fashion the first series of the 2022 Kelly Cup playoffs, 4–3. They then went on to sweep Wheeling and best Utah in 5 games after losing Game 1. The Walleye would go on to lose the Kelly Cup Finals to the Florida Everblades.

The following 3 seasons, the Walleye won the regular season division title twice, while making it as far as the conference finals each postseason, losing to Idaho and Kansas City, respectively, in 2023 and 2024 in the conference finals, and then losing in 2025 in the Kelly Cup Final to the Trois-Rivieres Lions 4 games to 1. In 2025-26, Toledo fell to rival Fort Wayne 4 games to 2 in the Central Division finals, having also come up short to Fort Wayne for the regular-season division title that season.

=== Mascots ===
On July 27, 2009, the Walleye introduced Spike, their costumed mascot at a Toledo Mud Hens baseball game. Spike is a yellow anthropomorphic walleye, adorned with a white Walleyes jersey, blue gloves, helmet and shoes and a gap tooth smile. Spike's nemesis is Cat Trick, a fuzzy blue cat, with a fishing vest and bright yellow boots. The two like to take cheap shots at each other during games.

=== Winterfest ===
The first ECHL outdoor hockey event was at Fifth Third Field on Saturday, December 27, 2014. The Walleye lost 2-1 to the visiting Kalamazoo Wings. On January 5, the Walleye fell to the Fort Wayne Komets 3-2 in a shootout. In addition to the Walleye games, the annual Battle of the Badges game between the Toledo Police Department and Toledo Fire Department occurred on December 31, the U.S. National Under 18 Team defeated Adrian College 6-1 in an exhibition on January 1, and Bowling Green played Robert Morris to a 2-2 draw on January 4. Anthony Wayne High School, Saint Ignatius High School, Saint John's High School, Whitmer High School, and many other youth and adult teams also participated in the Winterfest. Over 10 days, an estimated 45,000 to 50,000 people attended events at the stadium.

== Rivalries ==
=== Fort Wayne Komets ===
The Walleye's rivalry with the Komets dates back to the time when the teams from both cities played each other in IHL. The Komets play in the same division as the Walleye, and each game usually features a high score and a major fight or two because of the high animosity between the two teams. Ever since the 2009–10 ECHL season, the teams have played each other six times in the playoffs: 2015, 2017, 2018, 2019, 2025, and 2026, with Toledo winning four of the six series.

=== Cincinnati Cyclones ===
The Walleye’s rivalry with the Cyclones comes from both teams playing in the state of Ohio, as well as the same division as Fort Wayne. The two teams have met each other four times in the playoffs: 2013, 2019, 2022, and 2023, with Toledo winning the most recent three of the four series.

== Season-by-season record ==
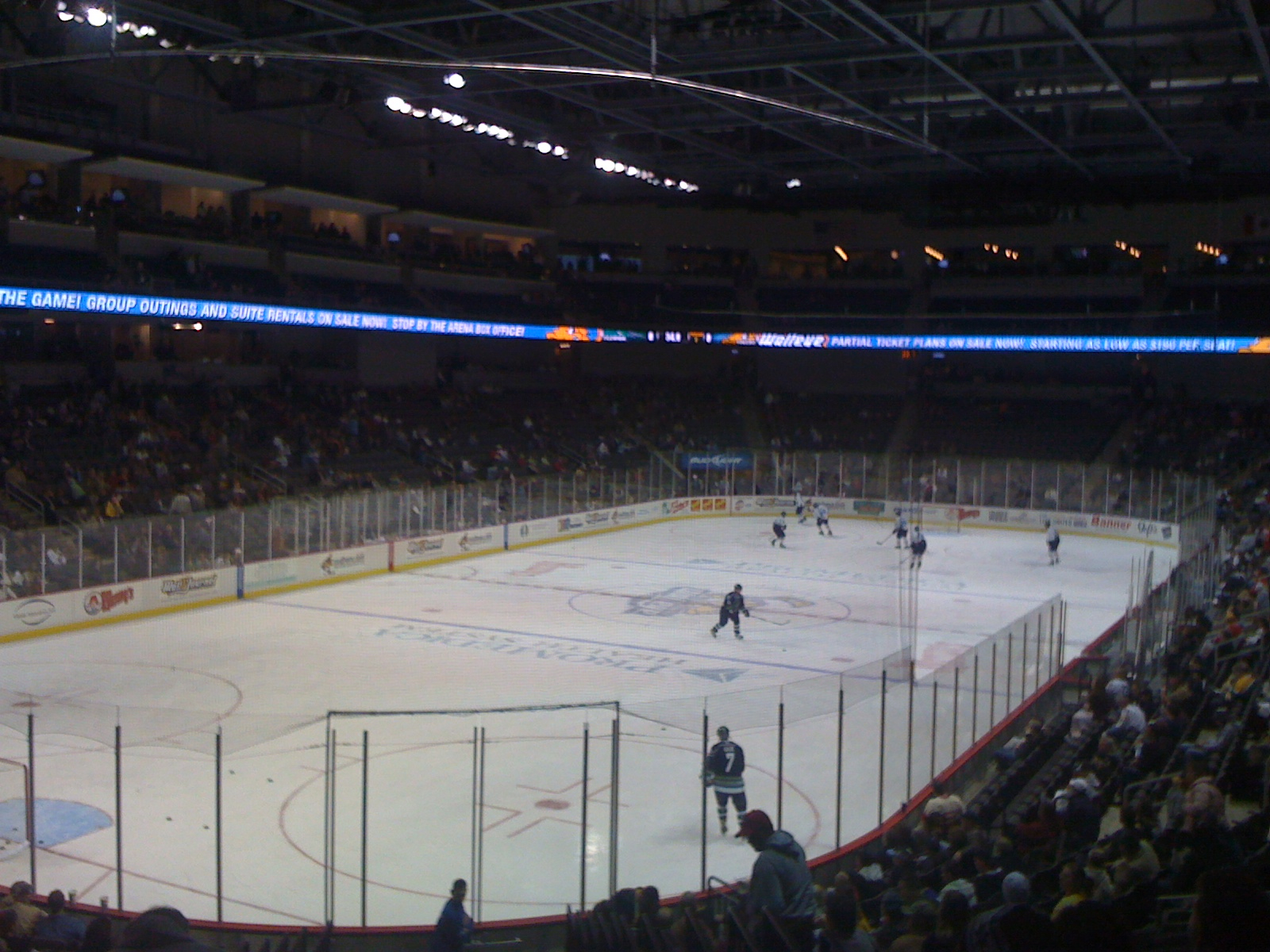
Opening night of the 2009–10 Toledo Walleye season

Note: GP = Games played, W = Wins, L = Losses, OTL = Overtime losses, SOL = shootout losses, Pts = Points, GF = Goals for, GA = Goals against, PIM = Penalties in minutes

Regular season											Playoffs				
Season	GP	W	L	OTL	SOL	Pts	GF	GA	PIM	Standing	Year	1st round	2nd round	3rd round	Kelly Cup
2009–10	72	35	30	2	5	77	254	274	1452	3rd, North	2010	L, 1–3, CHA	—	—	—
2010–11	72	33	33	4	2	72	239	255	1195	4th, North	2011	did not qualify			
2011–12	72	28	38	2	4	62	189	258	1140	4th, North	2012	did not qualify			
2012–13	72	37	26	5	4	83	224	195	982	2nd, North	2013	L, 2–4, CIN	—	—	—
2013–14	72	21	44	4	3	49	193	268	1020	5th, North	2014	did not qualify			
2014–15	72	50	15	5	2	107	281	182	785	1st, North	2015	W, 4–3, WHL	W, 4–3, FW	L, 3–4, SC	—
2015–16	72	47	20	2	3	99	225	174	665	1st, North	2016	L, 3–4, REA	—	—	—
2016–17	72	51	17	2	2	106	302	191	849	1st, Central	2017	W, 4–3, KAL	W, 4–1, FW	L, 1–4, COL	—
2017–18	72	50	17	3	2	105	242	170	846	1st, Central	2018	W, 4–0, IND	L, 2–4, FW	—	—
2018–19	72	40	23	6	3	89	237	221	1016	2nd, Central	2019	W, 4–2, FW	W, 4–1, CIN	W, 4–3, TUL	L, 2–4, NFL
2019–20	59	37	17	4	1	79	225	163	748	2nd, Central	2020	Season cancelled due to the COVID-19 pandemic			
2020–21	Opted out of participating due to the COVID-19 pandemic										2021	did not participate			
2021–22	72	49	19	2	2	102	277	203	760	1st, Central	2022	W, 4–3, CIN	W, 4–0, WHL	W, 4–1, UTA	L, 1–4, FLA
2022–23	72	45	19	5	3	98	252	179	886	2nd, Central	2023	W 4–0, IND	W 4–0, CIN	L 1–4, IDA	—
2023–24	71	48	14	4	5	105	289	209	809	1st, Central	2024	W, 4–0, KAL	W, 4–0, WHL	L, 2–4, KCM	—
2024–25	72	44	17	9	2	99	234	195	760	1st, Central	2025	W, 4–0, IND	W, 4–2, FW	W, 4–1, KCM	L, 1–4, TRL
2025–26	72	43	17	7	5	98	253	198	608	2nd, Central	2026	W, 4–2, BLO	L, 2–4, FW	—	—

== Players and personnel ==
=== Current roster ===
Updated October 16, 2025.

No.	Nat	Player	Pos	S/G	Age	Acquired	Birthplace	Contract
5	(United States)	Nicklas Andrews	D	L	25	2025	Canton, Michigan	Griffins
6	(United States)	Tanner Palocsik	D	R	27	2025	Aliquippa, Pennsylvania	Walleye
7	(United States)	Sam Craggs (A)	F	L	29	2021	Elmhurst, Illinois	Walleye
8	(Russia)	Denis Smirnov	F	L	29	2025	Moscow, Russia	Walleye
9	(United States)	Will Hillman	F	L	25	2025	Blaine, Minnesota	Walleye
11	(United States)	Brendon Michaelian	D	L	28	2023	Wixom, Michigan	Walleye
12	(United States)	Tanner Dickerson	F	L	24	2025	Perrysburg, Ohio	Walleye
13	(United States)	Jacques Bouquot	F	L	26	2025	South Windsor, Connecticut	Walleye
16	(United States)	Brandon Hawkins (C)	F	R	32	2021	Macomb Township, Michigan	Walleye
21	(Canada)	Bobby Russell (ice hockey)	D	L	26	2025	Langley, British Columbia	Walleye
23	(United States)	Conlan Keenan (A)	F	L	31	2021	Webster, New York	Walleye
24	(United States)	Colin Swoyer	D	R	28	2024	Hinsdale, Illinois	Walleye
25	(United States)	Jed Pietila	D	L	27	2024	Howell, Michigan	Walleye
26	(Canada)	Riley McCourt	D	L	26	2025	St. Catharines, Ontario	Walleye
27	(United States)	Nolan Moyle	F	R	27	2024	Briarcliff Manor, New York	Walleye
29	(Canada)	Darian Pilon	F	L	28	2023	Sault Ste. Marie, Ontario	Walleye
30	(Canada)	Carter Gylander	G	R	25	2024	Beaumont, Alberta	Red Wings
33	(Canada)	Nolan Lalonde	G	L	22	2025	Kingston, Ontario	Blue Jackets
34	(United States)	Jordan Ernst	F	L	29	2025	Mokena, Illinois	Walleye
37	(United States)	Dylan Moulton	D	L	25	2025	Nolensville, Tennessee	Walleye
39	(United States)	Chad Hillebrand	F	L	27	2025	Skokie, Illinois	Walleye
62	(United States)	Darby Llewellyn	F	L	30	2025	Ann Arbor, Michigan	Walleye
70	(Canada)	Liam Soulière	G	L	27	2025	Blainville, Quebec	Walleye
77	(Canada)	Colby Ambrosio	F	R	24	2024	Welland, Ontario	Walleye
78	(United States)	Tanner Kelly	F	R	24	2025	San Diego, California	Walleye
79	(Canada)	Nathaël Roy	F	L	26	2025	Lévis, Quebec	Walleye

=== Team captains ===
- Ryan Stokes, 2009–10
- Adam Keefe, 2010–11
- Kyle Rogers, 2011–14
- Jared Nightingale, 2014–17
- Alden Hirschfeld, 2017–18
- T. J. Hensick, 2019–21
- John Albert, 2022–23
- Brandon Hawkins, 2025–present

=== Head coaches ===
- Nick Vitucci, 2009–2014
- Derek Lalonde, 2014–2016
- Dan Watson, 2014 (interim), 2016–2023
- Pat Mikesch, 2023–present

== Team records ==
Updated – June 20, 2025

=== Single season ===
Goals: 40 – Brandon Hawkins (2023–24)
Assists: 68 – Shane Berschbach (2016–17)
Points: 93 – Brandon Hawkins (2023–24)
Penalty minutes: 246 – Bryan Moore (2018–19)

=== Career ===
Goals: 151 – Brandon Hawkins (2021–25)
Assists: 277 – Shane Berschbach (2014–20)
Points: 393 – Shane Berschbach (2014–20)
Penalty minutes: 246 – Bryan Moore (2018–19)
Games Played: 376 – Shane Berschbach (2014–20)

== Awards and honors ==
Most Valuable Player

- Josh Kestner: 2019–20
- Brandon Hawkins: 2023–24, 2024–25

Leading Scorer

- Josh Kestner: 2019–20
- Brandon Hawkins: 2023–24, 2024–25

All-ECHL First Team

- J.C. Sawyer: 2009–10
- Shane Berschbach: 2015–16
- Josh Kestner: 2019–20
- Brandon Hawkins: 2022–23
- John Lethemon: 2022–23

All-ECHL Second Team

- Jason Lepine: 2010–11
- Jeff Lerg: 2014–15, 2015–16
- Shane Berschbach: 2016–17
- Jake Paterson: 2016–17
- Matt Register: 2018–19

All-ECHL Rookie Team

- Maxime Tanguay: 2009–10
- Andy Bohmbach: 2010–11
- Tyler Barnes: 2014–15
- Tylor Spink: 2016–17
- Tyson Spink: 2016–17
- Nolan Zajac: 2016–17
- Billy Christopoulos: 2019–20

CCM Defenseman of the Year

- J.C. Sawyer: 2009–10

CCM Rookie of the Year

- Tyler Barnes: 2014–15
- Tyson Spink: 2016–17

ECHL All-Star Game Selection

- J.C. Sawyer: 2010
- Maxime Tanguay: 2010
- Peter Leblanc: 2011
- Luke Glendening: 2013
- Ben Youds: 2013
- Tyler Barnes: 2015

Sportsmanship Award

- Randy Rowe: 2012–13
- Shane Berschbach: 2015–16, 2016–17

North Division Champions

- 2014–15: 107 Points
- 2015–16: 99 Points

Central Division Champions

- 2016–17: 106 Points
- 2017–18: 105 Points
- 2021–22: 102 Points

Bruce Taylor Trophy
ECHL Western Conference Playoff Champion

- 2018–19
- 2021–22

Henry Brabham Cup
ECHL regular season champion

- 2014–15: 107 Points
- 2016–17: 106 Points
- 2021–22: 102 Points

John Brophy Award
ECHL Coach of the Year

- Derek Lalonde: 2014–15
- Dan Watson: 2016–17

Executive of the Year

- Joe Napoli: 2012–13, 2014–15
- Neil Neukam: 2017–18, 2018–19

Reebok Athletic Trainer of the Year

- Brad Fredrick: 2014–15

Ticket Executive of the Year

- Brian Perkins: 2014–15

Outstanding Media Award

- Mark Monroe, Toledo Blade (2015–16)

Team awards

- Overall Award of Excellence: 2009–10, 2011–12, 2014–15, 2015–16, 2016–17, 2017–18
- Ticket Department of the Year: 2016–17
- Social Media Award of Excellence: 2015–16
- ECHL Best Ice Award: 2015–16, 2016–17, 2017–18, 2018–19, 2019–20

Preceded by Toledo Storm	Professional ice hockey team in Toledo, Ohio; 2009–present	Succeeded by Current team
Preceded by Alaska Aces; Missouri Mavericks; Florida Everblades	Brabham Cup champions 2014–15; 2016–17; 2021–22	Succeeded by Missouri Mavericks; Florida Everblades; Idaho Steelheads
