= 2022 Kelly Cup playoffs =

Tournament details
- Dates: April 20 – June 11
- Teams: 16

Final positions
- Champions: Florida Everblades
- Runners-up: Toledo Walleye

Tournament statistics
- Scoring leader(s): Brandon Hawkins (Toledo) (33 points)

Awards
- MVP: Cam Johnson (Florida)

The 2022 Kelly Cup playoffs of the ECHL hockey league began on April 20, 2022, following the conclusion of the 2021–22 ECHL regular season and ended on June 11 with the Florida Everblades winning their second Kelly Cup over the Toledo Walleye in five games.

== Playoff format ==
The league announced its playoff format on January 21, 2022. At the end of the regular season, the top four teams in each division qualify for the 2022 Kelly Cup playoffs and are seeded one through four based on the highest points percentage earned in the season. Then the first two rounds of the playoffs are held within the division with the first seed facing the fourth seed and the second seed facing the third. The division champions then play each other in a conference championship. The Kelly Cup finals pit the Eastern Conference champion against the Western Conference champion. All four rounds are a best-of-seven format.

== Playoff seeds ==
After the regular season, 16 teams qualified for the playoffs. The Toledo Walleye were the first team to qualify during the regular season on March 26, with the Reading Royals qualifying shortly after on March 29. Due to the imbalanced scheduling during the pandemic, teams were seeded by points percentage.

Final seeds and points percentages:

=== Eastern Conference ===
==== North Division ====
- Reading Royals – Division champions, .697 pts%
- Newfoundland Growlers – .664 pts%
- Trois-Rivières Lions – .536 pts%
- Maine Mariners – .514 pts%

==== South Division ====
- Florida Everblades – Division champions, .653 pts%
- Atlanta Gladiators – .632 pts%
- Jacksonville Icemen – .590 pts%
- Greenville Swamp Rabbits – .528 pts%

=== Western Conference ===
==== Central Division ====
- Toledo Walleye – Brabham Cup winners, division champions, .708 pts%
- Fort Wayne Komets – .604 pts%
- Wheeling Nailers – .542 pts%
- Cincinnati Cyclones – .528 pts%

==== Mountain Division ====
- Utah Grizzlies – Division champions, .604 pts%
- Rapid City Rush – .576 pts%
- Allen Americans – .549 pts%
- Tulsa Oilers – .542 pts%

== Playoff bracket ==
Division Semifinals	Division Finals
N1	Reading	4
N4	Maine	2
N1	Reading	3
N2	Newfoundland	4
N2	Newfoundland	4
N3	Trois-Rivières	3
North Division
S1	Florida	4
S4	Greenville	2
S1	Florida	4
S3	Jacksonville	0
S2	Atlanta	0
S3	Jacksonville	4
C1	Toledo	4
C4	Cincinnati	3
C1	Toledo	4
C3	Wheeling	0
C2	Fort Wayne	3
C3	Wheeling	4
South Division
M1	Utah	4
M4	Tulsa	3
M1	Utah	4
M2	Rapid City	2
M2	Rapid City	4
M3	Allen	1

Conference Finals
N2	Newfoundland	1
S1	Florida	4
C1	Toledo	4
M1	Utah	1

Kelly Cup Finals
S1	Florida	4
C1	Toledo	1

== Division semifinals ==
=== North Division ===
==== (1) Reading Royals vs. (4) Maine Mariners ====
April 20	Maine Mariners	2–3	Reading Royals	Santander Arena	Recap
No scoring		First period	13:06 – pp – Kenny Hausinger (1)
No scoring		Second period	10:31 – Brayden Low (1); 19:10 – Brayden Low (2)
Zach Malatesta (1) – 17:20; Nick Master (1) – 19:15		Third period	No scoring
Stefanos Lekkas 33 saves / 36 shots		Goalie stats	Logan Flodell 28 saves / 30 shots

April 22	Maine Mariners	0–3	Reading Royals	Santander Arena	Recap
No scoring		First period	4:29 – pp – Trevor Gooch (1)
No scoring		Second period	5:26 – Kenny Hausinger (2); 5:55 – Frank DiChiara (1)
No scoring		Third period	No scoring
Callum Booth 8 saves / 11 shots Jeremy Brodeur 9 saves / 9 shots		Goalie stats	Logan Flodell 32 saves / 32 shots

April 28	Reading Royals	4–5	Maine Mariners	Cross Insurance Arena	Recap
No scoring		First period	9:29 – pp – Conner Bleackley (1)
Kenny Hausinger (3) – 3:14; Jacob Pritchard (1) – 6:54; Brad Morrison (1) – 8:45; Garrett McFadden (1) – 18:19		Second period	4:32 – Mathew Santos (1); 11:51 – Cameron Askew (1)
No scoring		Third period	1:14 – Reid Stefanson (1); 17:34 – Mathew Santos (2)
Logan Flodell 30 saves / 35 shots		Goalie stats	Stefanos Lekkas 15 saves / 19 shots Jeremy Brodeur 6 saves / 6 shots

April 29	Reading Royals	0–4	Maine Mariners	Cross Insurance Arena	Recap
No scoring		First period	No scoring
No scoring		Second period	19:07 – Nick Master (2)
No scoring		Third period	5:38 – pp – Alex Kile (1); 17:22 – pp – Cameron Askew (2); 18:21 – en – Keltie Jeri-Leon (1)
Logan Flodell 22 saves / 25 shots		Goalie stats	Callum Booth 32 saves / 32 shots

April 30	Reading Royals	3–2	Maine Mariners	Cross Insurance Arena	Recap
10:25 – Patrick Bajkov (1)		First period	Cameron Askew (3) – pp – 18:46
3:27 – Frank DiChiara (2)		Second period	Alex Kile (2) – 5:55
12:34 – pp – Thomas Ebbing (1)		Third period	No scoring
Logan Flodell 25 saves / 27 shots		Goalie stats	Callum Booth 29 saves / 32 shots

May 2	Maine Mariners	1–2	Reading Royals	Santander Arena	Recap
9:08 – Nick Master (3)		First period	No scoring
No scoring		Second period	Trevor Gooch (2) – 7:27
No scoring		Third period	Jacob Pritchard (2) – pp – 7:09
Callum Booth 31 saves / 33 shots		Goalie stats	Pat Nagle 30 saves / 31 shots

Reading won series 4–2

==== (2) Newfoundland Growlers vs. (3) Trois-Rivières Lions ====
April 22	Trois-Rivières Lions	4–7	Newfoundland Growlers	Mary Brown's Centre	Recap
Shawn St-Amant (1) – 14:04; Julien Nantel (1) – pp – 16:46		First period	13:35 – Matt Hellickson (1)
Peter Abbandonato (1) – 19:25		Second period	2:31 – pp – Gordie Green (1); 7:12 – Tyler Boland (1); 14:49 – Orrin Centazzo (1)
Olivier Archambault (1) – pp – 7:48		Third period	2:25 – Zach O'Brien (1); 8:33 – pp – Orrin Centazzo (2); 19:59 – en – Matt Hellickson (2)
Philippe Desrosiers 35 saves / 41 shots		Goalie stats	Keith Petruzzelli 35 saves / 39 shots

April 23	Trois-Rivières Lions	2–6	Newfoundland Growlers	Mary Brown's Centre	Recap
Shawn St-Amant (2) – 10:57		First period	12:20 – Isaac Johnson (1); 18:48 – Ryan Chyzowski (1)
No scoring		Second period	11:12 – Gordie Green (2); 11:45 – Marc Johnstone (1)
Anthony Nellis (1) – 12:37		Third period	4:06 – Orrin Centazzo (3); 16:30 – Tyler Boland (2)
Philippe Desrosiers 24 saves / 30 shots		Goalie stats	Keith Petruzzelli 24 saves / 26 shots

April 26	Newfoundland Growlers	2–3	Trois-Rivières Lions	Colisée Vidéotron	Recap
No scoring		First period	No scoring
Tyler Boland (3) – 1:40		Second period	8:39 – Anthony Nellis (2); 19:20 – Anthony Nellis (3)
Zach O'Brien (2) – 18:00		Third period	19:37 – Anthony Nellis (4)
Keith Petruzzelli 26 saves / 29 shots		Goalie stats	Philippe Desrosiers 30 saves / 32 shots

April 28	Newfoundland Growlers	5–2	Trois-Rivières Lions	Colisée Vidéotron	Recap
Ryan Chyzowski (2) – 6:10		First period	No scoring
Marc Johnstone (2) – 7:47; Noel Hoefenmayer (1) – 11:46; Derian Plouffe (1) – 11:57		Second period	No scoring
Todd Skirving (1) – pp-en – 17:58		Third period	1:44 – Justin Ducharme (1); 19:26 – pp – Hayden Shaw (1)
Keith Petruzzelli 31 saves / 33 shots		Goalie stats	Philippe Desrosiers 26 saves / 30 shots

April 30	Newfoundland Growlers	2–3	Trois-Rivières Lions	Colisée Vidéotron	Recap
Tyler Boland (4) – 3:07		First period	7:18 – Alexis D'Aoust (1)
Tyler Boland (5) – 16:19		Second period	16:43 – Cedric Montminy (1)
No scoring		Third period	9:16 – Alexis D'Aoust (2)
Keith Petruzzelli 27 saves / 30 shots		Goalie stats	Philippe Desrosiers 35 saves / 37 shots

May 2	Trois-Rivières Lions	7–4	Newfoundland Growlers	Mary Brown's Centre	Recap
Cedric Montminy (2) – 1:00		First period	5:05 – Gordie Green (3)
Peter Abbandonato (2) – 4:06; Brenden Locke (1) – 4:30; Olivier Galipeau (1) – 19:29		Second period	9:23 – sh – Derian Plouffe (2); 14:43 – pp – Jeremy McKenna (1)
Anthony Nellis (1) – 1:27; Brenden Locke (2) – 9:42; Josh Brook (1) – en – 19:27		Third period	16:26 – pp – Tyler Boland (6)
Philippe Desrosiers 33 saves / 37 shots		Goalie stats	Keith Petruzzelli 21 saves / 27 shots

May 3	Trois-Rivières Lions	2–5	Newfoundland Growlers	Mary Brown's Centre	Recap
No scoring		First period	15:01 – Tyler Boland (7)
Anthony Nellis (6) – 11:49		Second period	5:24 – Noel Hoefenmayer (2)
Hayden Shaw (2) – pp – 11:02		Third period	2:32 – Tyler Boland (8); 14:15 – Ben Finkelstein (1); 18:29 – en – Orrin Centazzo (4)
Philippe Desrosiers 22 saves / 26 shots		Goalie stats	Keith Petruzzelli 26 saves / 28 shots

Newfoundland won series 4–3

=== South Division ===
==== (1) Florida Everblades vs. (4) Greenville Swamp Rabbits ====
April 22	Greenville Swamp Rabbits	3–4	OT	Florida Everblades	Hertz Arena	Recap
Christian Kåsastul (1) – 8:59; Nikita Pavlychev (1) – 9:39; Ayden MacDonald (1) – 14:52		First period		No scoring
No scoring		Second period		15:01 – pp – Stefan Leblanc (1)
No scoring		Third period		18:40 – pp – Blake Winiecki (1); 19:25 – Matteo Gennaro (1)
No scoring		First overtime period		2:05 – John McCarron (1)
John Lethemon 34 saves / 38 shots		Goalie stats		Parker Gahagen 25 saves / 28 shots

April 23	Greenville Swamp Rabbits	5–3	Florida Everblades	Hertz Arena	Recap
No scoring		First period	9:31 – Chris McKay (1)
Alec Rauhauser (1) – pp – 4:48; Ben Freeman (1) – pp – 6:51; Kevin McKernan (1) – 9:16; Joe Gatenby (1) – sh – 14:12		Second period	16:02 – Xavier Bouchard (1); 18:48 – Alex Aleardi (1)
Ben Freeman (2) – sh – en – 18:46		Third period	No scoring
John Lethemon 37 saves / 40 shots		Goalie stats	Parker Gahagen 19 saves / 23 shots

April 27	Florida Everblades	4–3	OT	Greenville Swamp Rabbits	Bon Secours Wellness Arena	Recap
Levko Koper (1) – sh – 18:11		First period		14:33 – sh – Alex Ierullo (1)
Matteo Gennaro (2) – pp – 16:41		Second period		17:37 – pp – Nikita Pavlychev (2)
Jake Jaremko (1) – 2:13		Third period		9:30 – pp – Anthony Rinaldi (1)
Alex Aleardi (2) – pp – 7:41		First overtime period		No scoring
Cam Johnson 29 saves / 32 shots		Goalie stats		John Lethemon 30 saves / 34 shots

April 29	Florida Everblades	2–1	Greenville Swamp Rabbits	Bon Secours Wellness Arena	Recap
Zach Solow (1) – 4:22		First period	No scoring
Matteo Gennaro (3) – pp – 16:34		Second period	2:26 – pp – Liam Pecararo (1)
No scoring		Third period	No scoring
Cam Johnson 25 saves / 26 shots		Goalie stats	John Lethemon 20 saves / 22 shots

April 30	Florida Everblades	3–4	2OT	Greenville Swamp Rabbits	Bon Secours Wellness Arena	Recap
15:14 – pp – Stefan Leblanc (2)		First period		No scoring
14:29 – pp – Matteo Gennaro (4)		Second period		No scoring
10:37 – pp – Blake Winiecki (2)		Third period		Johnny Coughlin (1) – 8:52; Ayden MacDonald (2) – 14:02; Liam Pecararo (2) – 18:49
No scoring		Second overtime period		Nikita Pavlychev (3) – 8:51
Cam Johnson 28 saves / 32 shots		Goalie stats		John Lethemon 56 saves / 59 shots

May 2	Greenville Swamp Rabbits	1–5	Florida Everblades	Hertz Arena	Recap
No scoring		First period	No scoring
2:42 – pp – Bobby Russell (1)		Second period	John McCarron (2) – pp – 11:07
No scoring		Third period	Joe Pendenza (1) – 10:14; Zach Solow (2) – 13:28; Darik Angeli (1) – 15:52; Joe Pendenza (2) – en – 17:11
John Lethemon 31 saves / 35 shots		Goalie stats	Cam Johnson 19 saves / 20 shots

Florida won series 4–2

==== (2) Atlanta Gladiators vs. (3) Jacksonville Icemen ====
April 21	Atlanta Gladiators	2–3	Jacksonville Icemen	VyStar Veterans Memorial Arena	Recap
10:41 – Shin Sang-hoon (1)		First period	Ian McKinnon (1) – 17:39
17:22 – Derek Nesbitt (1)		Second period	No scoring
No scoring		Third period	Brendan Harris (1) – 1:07; Brendan Harris (2) – 4:24
Chris Nell 27 saves / 30 shots		Goalie stats	François Brassard 24 saves / 26 shots

April 22	Atlanta Gladiators	4–5	OT	Jacksonville Icemen	VyStar Veterans Memorial Arena	Recap
No scoring		First period		No scoring
13:30 – Paul McAvoy (1)		Second period		James Sanchez (1) – 2:18; Brendan Harris (3) – 5:19; Travis Howe (1) – 10:28
15:54 – Hugo Roy (1); 17:25 – Michael Turner (1); 19:59 – Cody Sylvester (1)		Third period		Abbott Girduckis (1) – pp – 9:51
No scoring		First overtime period		Ben Hawerchuk (1) – 9:12
Joe Murdaca 23 saves / 28 shots		Goalie stats		Charles Williams 32 saves / 36 shots

April 27	Atlanta Gladiators	1–2	Jacksonville Icemen	VyStar Veterans Memorial Arena	Recap
No scoring		First period	3:13 – pp – Luke Lynch (1)
No scoring		Second period	19:06 – Ara Nazarian (1)
Mitchell Hoelscher (1) – 11:11		Third period	No scoring
Chris Nell 22 saves / 24 shots		Goalie stats	François Brassard 27 saves / 28 shots

April 28	Atlanta Gladiators	0–5	Jacksonville Icemen	VyStar Veterans Memorial Arena	Recap
No scoring		First period	13:20 – Ben Hawerchuk (2)
No scoring		Second period	6:13 – Luke Lynch (2); 10:40 – Craig Martin (1)
No scoring		Third period	15:24 – pp – Christopher Brown (1); 17:24 – en – Jacob Friend (1)
Chris Nell 18 saves / 22 shots		Goalie stats	François Brassard 37 saves / 37 shots

Jacksonville won series 4–0

=== Central Division ===
==== (1) Toledo Walleye vs. (4) Cincinnati Cyclones ====
April 22	Cincinnati Cyclones	2–3	OT	Toledo Walleye	Huntington Center	Recap
Zack Andrusiak (1) – 14:20		First period		4:36 – John Albert (1); 14:55 – pp – John Albert (2)
Lukas Cragg (1) – 16:31		Second period		No scoring
No scoring		Third period		No scoring
No scoring		First overtime period		14:55 – John Albert (3)
Michael Houser 32 saves / 35 shots		Goalie stats		Billy Christopoulos 34 saves / 36 shots

April 23	Cincinnati Cyclones	3–2	Toledo Walleye	Huntington Center	Recap
Justin Vaive (1) – 6:12; Luc Brown (1) – 16:00; Justin Vaive (2) – 18:57		First period	0:09 – Brandon Hawkins (1); 14:49 – pp – Brandon Hawkins (2)
No scoring		Second period	No scoring
No scoring		Third period	No scoring
Sean Bonar 28 saves / 30 shots		Goalie stats	Billy Christopoulos 28 saves / 31 shots

April 25	Toledo Walleye	5–6	OT	Cincinnati Cyclones	Heritage Bank Center	Recap
Matt Berry (1) – pp – 10:37; Cam Clarke (1) – 12:22		First period		1:45 – Graeme Brown (1)
Matt Berry (2) – pp – 8:42		Second period		5:09 – Zack Andrusiak (2); 18:41 – pp – Dominic Franco (1)
Brett Boeing (1) – sh – 5:03; T. J. Hensick (1) – 12:45		Third period		7:10 – pp – Dajon Mingo (1); 17:59 – Lukas Craggs (2)
No scoring		First overtime period		9:40 – pp – Patrick Polino (1)
Billy Christopoulos 33 saves / 39 shots		Goalie stats		Michael Houser 37 saves / 42 shots

April 27	Toledo Walleye	4–1	Cincinnati Cyclones	Heritage Bank Center	Recap
Cole Fraser (1) – 1:47		First period	No scoring
T. J. Hensick (2) – pp – 7:27; Patrick Curry (1) – 18:58		Second period	1:23 – Zack Andrusiak (3)
Brandon Hawkins (3) – en – 18:09		Third period	No scoring
Billy Christopoulos 27 saves / 28 shots		Goalie stats	Michael Houser 28 saves / 31 shots

April 28	Toledo Walleye	0–2	Cincinnati Cyclones	Heritage Bank Center	Recap
No scoring		First period	No scoring
No scoring		Second period	Lincoln Griffin (1) – 17:13
No scoring		Third period	Zack Andrusiak (4) – 10:43
Billy Christopoulos 29 saves / 31 shots		Goalie stats	Michael Houser 42 saves / 42 shots

April 30	Cincinnati Cyclones	0–3	Toledo Walleye	Huntington Center	Recap
No scoring		First period	John Albert (4) – pp – 15:48
No scoring		Second period	No scoring
No scoring		Third period	Brett McKenzie (1) – 9:42; T.J. Hensick (3) – 13:10
Michael Houser 41 saves / 44 shots		Goalie stats	Billy Christopoulos 18 saves / 18 shots

May 3	Cincinnati Cyclones	2–4	Toledo Walleye	Huntington Center	Recap
No scoring		First period	13:28 – Brandon Hawkins (4); 14:47 – pp – Brandon Hawkins (5)
Dajon Mingo (2) – 19:09		Second period	16:34 – John Albert (5)
Luc Brown (2) – 1:25		Third period	2:51 – Brandon Hawkins (6)
Sean Bonar 26 saves / 30 shots		Goalie stats	Billy Christopoulos 26 saves / 28 shots

Toledo won series 4–3

==== (2) Fort Wayne Komets vs. (3) Wheeling Nailers ====
April 22	Wheeling Nailers	1–0	Fort Wayne Komets	Allen County War Memorial Coliseum	Recap
Patrick Watling (1) – 19:55		First period	No scoring
No scoring		Second period	No scoring
No scoring		Third period	No scoring
Louis-Philip Guindon 34 saves / 34 shots		Goalie stats	Samuel Harvey 22 saves / 23 shots

April 23	Wheeling Nailers	4–2	Fort Wayne Komets	Allen County War Memorial Coliseum	Recap
Dylan MacPherson (1) – pp – 15:35		First period	7:33 – Will Graber (1)
Jared Cockrell (1) – 16:21		Second period	No scoring
Sean Josling (1) – 6:15; Cam Hausinger (1) – 18:10		Third period	16:50 – Adam Brubacher (1)
Louis-Philip Guindon 41 saves / 43 shots		Goalie stats	Samuel Harvey 24 saves / 28 shots

April 27	Fort Wayne Komets	4–1	Wheeling Nailers	WesBanco Arena	Recap
Anthony Petruzzelli (1) – 14:33; Willie Corrin (1) – pp – 17:47; Oliver Cooper (1) – pp – 19:09		First period	4:24 – Cam Hausinger (2)
Mark Rassell (1) – sh – 14:53		Second period	No scoring
No scoring		Third period	No scoring
Samuel Harvey 22 saves / 23 shots		Goalie stats	Louis-Philip Guindon 46 saves / 50 shots

April 29	Fort Wayne Komets	4–3	OT	Wheeling Nailers	WesBanco Arena	Recap
Mark Rassell (2) – pp – 5:39; Oliver Cooper (2) – 15:47		First period		12:03 – Cam Hausinger (3)
No scoring		Second period		No scoring
Will Graber (2) – pp – 0:56		Third period		4:01 – Cam Hausinger (4); 9:12 – pp – Josh Maniscalco (1)
Mark Rassell (3) – 5:17		First overtime period		No scoring
Samuel Harvey 36 saves / 39 shots		Goalie stats		Louis-Philip Guindon 23 saves / 27 shots

April 30	Fort Wayne Komets	2–3	Wheeling Nailers	WesBanco Arena	Recap
No scoring		First period	Matt Quercia (1) – 19:57
2:27 – Adam Brubacher (2)		Second period	Josh Maniscalco (2) – 6:24
6:38 – Matt Boudens (1)		Third period	Samuel Houde (1) – 17:58
Samuel Harvey 25 saves / 28 shots		Goalie stats	Louis-Philip Guindon 21 saves / 23 shots

May 2	Wheeling Nailers	3–4	OT	Fort Wayne Komets	Allen County War Memorial Coliseum	Recap
14:22 – Cam Hausinger (5)		First period		Anthony Petruzzelli (2) – 17:59; Zach Pochiro (1) – 18:19
0:43 – pp – Cam Hausinger (6); 9:59 - Cam Hausinger (7)		Second period		Lynden McCallum (1) – 9:06
No scoring		Third period		No scoring
No scoring		First overtime period		Matt Boudens (2) – 12:10
Louis-Philip Guindon 44 saves / 48 shots		Goalie stats		Samuel Harvey 30 saves / 33 shots

May 3	Wheeling Nailers	3–2	OT	Fort Wayne Komets	Allen County War Memorial Coliseum	Recap
No scoring		First period		6:21 – Mark Rassell (4)
Justin Almeida (1) – 3:11; Sean Josling (2) – 13:36		Second period		12:19 – Matt Alvaro (1)
No scoring		Third period		No scoring
Matt Quercia (2) – 6:30		First overtime period		No scoring
Louis-Philip Guindon 38 saves / 40 shots		Goalie stats		Samuel Harvey 31 saves / 34 shots

Wheeling won series 4–3

=== Mountain Division ===
==== (1) Utah Grizzlies vs. (4) Tulsa Oilers ====
April 22	Tulsa Oilers	3–6	Utah Grizzlies	Maverik Center	Recap
Alex Gilmour (1) – 14:20		First period	3:07 – pp – Dylan Fitze (1); 18:59 – sh – Ben Tardif (1)
Joseph Garreffa (1) – 4:45; Jackson Leef (1) – 9:06		Second period	14:19 – pp – Charle-Edouard D'Astous (1)
No scoring		Third period	9:40 – Zach Tsekos (1); 13:09 – Trey Bradley (1); 17:49 – pp – en – Trey Bradley (2)
Daniel Mannella 30 saves / 35 shots		Goalie stats	Peyton Jones 27 saves / 30 shots

April 23	Tulsa Oilers	5–3	Utah Grizzlies	Maverik Center	Recap
Alex Pommerville (1) – 10:59		First period	13:54 – pp – Charle-Edouard D'Astous (2); 15:17 – pp – Charle-Edouard D'Astous (3)
Adam Pleskach (1) – 5:09; Jack Doremus (1) – pp – 8:03; Maxim Golod (1) – 14:56		Second period	9:25 – Tarun Fizer (1)
Alex Gilmour (2) – 8:18		Third period	No scoring
Daniel Mannella 31 saves / 34 shots		Goalie stats	Trent Miner 23 saves / 28 shots

April 26	Utah Grizzlies	2–1	Tulsa Oilers	BOK Center	Recap
No scoring		First period	No scoring
Charle-Edouard D'Astous (4) – pp – 11:07; Charle-Edouard D'Astous (5) – 15:27		Second period	5:25 – Jimmy Soper (1)
No scoring		Third period	No scoring
Trent Miner 32 saves / 33 shots		Goalie stats	Daniel Mannella 23 saves / 25 shots

April 27	Utah Grizzlies	3–4	Tulsa Oilers	BOK Center	Recap
Benjamin Tardif (2) – 11:59		First period	19:23 – Joe Garreffa (2)
Charle-Edouard D'Astous (6) – 8:36		Second period	No scoring
Tarun Fizer (2) – pp – 7:46		Third period	2:02 – John Furgele (1); 4:37 – pp – Maxim Golod (2); 9:20 – Ethan Stewart (1)
Peyton Jones 30 saves / 34 shots		Goalie stats	Daniel Mannella 36 saves / 39 shots

April 28	Utah Grizzlies	5–1	Tulsa Oilers	BOK Center	Recap
No scoring		First period	Jackson Leef (2) – 16:43
11:19 – pp – Mason Mannek (1)		Second period	No scoring
1:12 – Trey Bradley (4); 10:23 – Trey Bradley (5); 11:02 – Connor McDonald (1); 16:44 – pp – Kyle Betts (1)		Third period	No scoring
Trent Miner 45 saves / 46 shots		Goalie stats	Daniel Mannella 26 saves / 30 shots Ryan Ruck 0 saves / 1 shot

May 2	Tulsa Oilers	4–2	Utah Grizzlies	Maverik Center	Recap
10:09 – Eddie Matsushima (1)		First period	Charle-Edouard D'Astous (7) – pp – 7:01
12:30 – Eddie Matsushima (2); 14:04 – Joe Garreffa (3)		Second period	No scoring
19:35 – en – Ethan Stewart (2)		Third period	Mason Mannek (2) – pp – 14:45
Daniel Mannella 34 saves / 36 shots		Goalie stats	Trent Miner 48 saves / 51 shots

May 4	Tulsa Oilers	2–5	Utah Grizzlies	Maverik Center	Recap
Mike McKee (1) – 14:03		First period	9:37 – pp – Kyle Betts (2); 19:37 – Charle-Edouard D'Astous (8)
No scoring		Second period	9:04 – Trey Bradley (5)
Eddie Matsushima (3) – sh – ps – 9:50		Third period	2:37 – Luka Burzan (1); 19:25 – en – Charle-Edouard D'Astous (9)
Daniel Mannella 30 saves / 34 shots		Goalie stats	Trent Miner 31 saves / 33 shots

Utah won series 4–3

==== (2) Rapid City Rush vs. (3) Allen Americans ====
April 22	Allen Americans	2–3	Rapid City Rush	The Monument	Recap
Chad Costello (1) – 8:21		First period	1:31 – Avery Peterson (1)
Chad Butcher (1) – 7:45		Second period	6:03 – Max Coatta (1)
No scoring		Third period	15:34 – Brett Gravelle (1)
Lucas Peressini 39 saves / 42 shots		Goalie stats	Lukáš Pařík 32 saves / 34 shots

April 23	Allen Americans	4–3	OT	Rapid City Rush	The Monument	Recap
Colby McAuley (1) – 2:56		First period		4:42 – pp – Gabriel Chabot (1)
No scoring		Second period		No scoring
Chad Costello (2) – 6:14; Branden Troock (1) – 17:58		Third period		8:50 – Gabriel Chabot (2); 12:18 – Max Coatta (2)
Ben Carroll (1) – 13:24		First overtime period		No scoring
Lucas Peressini 60 saves / 63 shots		Goalie stats		Lukáš Pařík 27 saves / 31 shots

April 26	Rapid City Rush	5–1	Allen Americans	Credit Union of Texas Event Center	Recap
Logan Nelson (1) – 18:04		First period	No scoring
Calder Brooks (1) – 4:13; Logan Nelson (2) – pp – 5:37; Calder Brooks (1) – pp – 15:39		Second period	13:11 – Spencer Asuchak (1)
Tyson Helgesen (1) – 3:17		Third period	No scoring
Lukáš Pařík 21 saves / 22 shots		Goalie stats	Lucas Peressini 29 saves / 34 shots Frank Marotte 14 saves / 14 shots

April 29	Rapid City Rush	4–1	Allen Americans	Credit Union of Texas Event Center	Recap
Calder Brooks (2) – 10:27		First period	6:30 – Ben Carroll (2)
Keegan Iverson (1) – 5:06		Second period	No scoring
Logan Nelson (3) – 5:00; Avery Peterson (2) – 13:00		Third period	No scoring
Lukáš Pařík 31 saves / 32 shots		Goalie stats	Lucas Peressini 32 saves / 36 shots

April 30	Rapid City Rush	6–3	Allen Americans	Credit Union of Texas Event Center	Recap
No scoring		First period	Chad Butcher (2) – 9:05
7:23 – Colton Leiter (1)		Second period	Kris Myllari (1) – pp – 4:47
0:24 – Stephen Baylis (1); 2:31 – pp – Logan Nelson (4); 17:49 – Gabriel Chabot (3); 18:09 – en – Calder Brooks (4); 19:51 – en – Max Coatta (3)		Third period	Colby McAuley (2) – 10:22
Lukáš Pařík 25 saves / 28 shots		Goalie stats	Frank Marotte 30 saves / 34 shots

Rapid City won series 4–1

== Division finals ==
=== North Division ===
==== (1) Reading Royals vs. (2) Newfoundland Growlers ====
May 7	Newfoundland Growlers	3–7	Reading Royals	Santander Arena	Recap
No scoring		First period	2:13 – Frank DiChiara (3); 5:54 – pp – Frank DiChiara (4); 7:13 – Kevin Conley (1); 16:04 – Dominic Cormier (1)
Gordie Green (4) – 13:21		Second period	0:30 – Trevor Gooch (3); 18:34 – Trevor Gooch (4)
Isaac Johnson (2) – 11:01; Marc Johnstone (3) – 18:15		Third period	18:43 – en – Trevor Gooch (5)
Keith Petruzzelli 8 saves / 12 shots Rylan Parenteau 16 saves / 18 shots		Goalie stats	Pat Nagle 28 saves / 31 shots

May 8	Newfoundland Growlers	4–1	Reading Royals	Santander Arena	Recap
Benjamin Finkelstein (2) – pp – 11:19		First period	No scoring
Zach O'Brien (3) – 1:34; Tyler Boland (9) – pp – 4:45		Second period	No scoring
Derian Plouffe (3) – pp – 19:30		Third period	5:24 – Kevin Conley (2)
Keith Petruzzelli 26 saves / 27 shots		Goalie stats	Pat Nagle 32 saves / 35 shots

May 10	Reading Royals	3–1	Newfoundland Growlers	Mary Brown's Centre	Recap
Brayden Low (3) – 2:38; Mason Millman (1) – 13:31		First period	No scoring
No scoring		Second period	No scoring
Thomas Ebbing (2) – pp – en – 19:37		Third period	0:47 – Jeremy McKenna (2)
Pat Nagle 33 saves / 34 shots		Goalie stats	Keith Petruzzelli 22 saves / 24 shots

May 11	Reading Royals	6–5	Newfoundland Growlers	Mary Brown's Centre	Recap
Trevor Gooch (6) – pp – 2:12; Brennan Saulnier (1) – 5:15; Patrick Bajkov (2) – 14:22		First period	8:09 – Marc Johnstone (4)
Frank DiChiara (5) – pp – 5:20		Second period	3:18 – Orrin Centazzo (5); 6:30 – sh – Noel Hoefenmayer (3)
Brennan Saulnier (2) – pp – 6:36; Trevor Gooch (7) – pp – 10:58		Third period	13:48 – sh – Orrin Centazzo (6); 18:45 – pp – Ben Finkelstein (3)
Pat Nagle 35 saves / 40 shots		Goalie stats	Keith Petruzzelli 2 saves / 5 shots Rylan Parenteau 12 saves / 15 shots

May 12	Reading Royals	1–5	Newfoundland Growlers	Mary Brown's Centre	Recap
No scoring		First period	Jeremy McKenna (3) – pp – 19:30
2:22 – pp – Thomas Ebbing (3)		Second period	Orrin Centazzo (7) – 8:04
No scoring		Third period	Pavel Gogolev (1) – pp – 6:31; Tyler Boland (10) pp – 7:03; Pavel Gogolev (2) – 10:12
Pat Nagle 23 saves / 28 shots		Goalie stats	Keith Petruzzelli 24 saves / 25 shots

May 14	Newfoundland Growlers	4–2	Reading Royals	Santander Arena	Recap
9:07 – Tyler Boland (11); 13:06 – Ben Finkelstein (4)		First period	No scoring
0:23 – Tyler Boland (12)		Second period	Kevin Conley (3) – 12:50; Brad Morrison (2) – 19:54
18:44 – en – Gordie Green (5)		Third period	No scoring
Keith Petruzzelli 20 saves / 22 shots		Goalie stats	Pat Nagle 20 saves / 23 shots

May 16	Newfoundland Growlers	4–2	Reading Royals	Santander Arena	Recap
Derian Plouffe (4) – sh – 17:03		First period	No scoring
Noel Hoefenmayer (4) – 9:38; Ben Finkelstein (5) – 15:03		Second period	11:06 – Patrick Bajkov (3); 17:43 – Brad Morrison (3)
Isaac Johnson (3) – 11:44		Third period	No scoring
Keith Petruzzelli 14 saves / 16 shots		Goalie stats	Pat Nagle 31 saves / 35 shots

Newfoundland won series 4–3

=== South Division ===
==== (1) Florida Everblades vs. (3) Jacksonville Icemen ====
May 6	Jacksonville Icemen	0–2	Florida Everblades	Hertz Arena	Recap
No scoring		First period	3:47 – Alex Aleardi (3)
No scoring		Second period	No scoring
No scoring		Third period	19:55 – en – Joe Pendenza (3)
François Brassard 28 saves / 29 shots		Goalie stats	Cam Johnson 22 saves / 22 shots

May 7	Jacksonville Icemen	3–5	Florida Everblades	Hertz Arena	Recap
No scoring		First period	12:28 – John McCarron (3); 15:20 – Matteo Gennaro (5); 18:13 – pp – Stefan Leblanc (3); 18:55 – Stephen Desrocher (1)
Brendan Harris (4) – pp – 0:34; James Sanchez (2) – pp – 19:35		Second period	No scoring
Luke Lynch (3) – 3:26		Third period	18:59 – en – Levko Kope (2)
François Brassard 11 saves / 15 shots Charles Williams 16 saves / 16 shots		Goalie stats	Cam Johnson 17 saves / 20 shots

May 10	Florida Everblades	2–0	Jacksonville Icemen	VyStar Veterans Memorial Arena	Recap
Zach Solow (3) – 2:52; Joe Pendenza (4) – 4:03		First period	No scoring
No scoring		Second period	No scoring
No scoring		Third period	No scoring
Cam Johnson 29 saves / 29 shots		Goalie stats	François Brassard 0 saves / 2 shots Charles Williams 28 saves / 28 shots

May 11	Florida Everblades	1–0	OT	Jacksonville Icemen	VyStar Veterans Memorial Arena	Recap
No scoring		First period		No scoring
No scoring		Second period		No scoring
No scoring		Third period		No scoring
Dylan Vander Esch (1) – 5:00		First overtime period		No scoring
Cam Johnson 25 saves / 25 shots		Goalie stats		Charles Williams 24 saves / 25 shots

Florida won series 4–0

=== Central Division ===
==== (1) Toledo Walleye vs. (3) Wheeling Nailers ====
May 6	Wheeling Nailers	1–5	Toledo Walleye	Huntington Center	Recap
Josh Maniscalco (3) – pp – 3:51		First period	1:09 – Brandon Hawkins (7); 12:49 – Patrick Curry (2); 15:26 – Gordi Myer (1)
No scoring		Second period	2:00 – Patrick Curry (3)
No scoring		Third period	5:22 – Chris Martenet (1)
Louis-Philip Guindon 5 saves / 9 shots Mitchell Weeks 19 saves / 20 shots		Goalie stats	Billy Christopoulos 23 saves / 24 shots

May 7	Wheeling Nailers	2–5	Toledo Walleye	Huntington Center	Recap
Matt Alfaro (1) – 1:00		First period	No scoring
No scoring		Second period	5:23 – pp – Brandon Hawkins (8); 14:49 – Brandon Hawkins (9); 15:48 – Cam Clarke (2); 18:44 – pp – T.J. Hensick (4)
Justin Almeida (2) – 10:35		Third period	7:12 – en – Brett McKenzie (2)
Louis-Philip Guindon 25 saves / 29 shots		Goalie stats	Billy Christopoulos 30 saves / 32 shots

May 10	Toledo Walleye	5–4	Wheeling Nailers	WesBanco Arena	Recap
Josh Dickinson (1) – 3:40; T.J. Hensick (5) – pp – 14:43		First period	No scoring
T.J. Hensick (6) – 5:23; T.J. Hensick (7) – 7:22; Patrick Curry (4) – 9:07		Second period	1:17 – Cam Hausinger (8); 14:16 – Matt Alfaro (2); 16:15 – pp – Cam Hausinger (9)
No scoring		Third period	13:03 – Sean Josling (3)
Billy Christopoulos 21 saves / 25 shots		Goalie stats	Louis-Philip Guindon 11 saves / 16 shots Mitchell Weeks 16 saves / 16 shots

May 12	Toledo Walleye	3–1	Wheeling Nailers	WesBanco Arena	Recap
Marcus Vela (1) – 6:12		First period	No scoring
John Albert (6) – 5:35; Patrick Curry (5) – 8:34		Second period	19:28 – Matt Alfaro (3)
No scoring		Third period	No scoring
Billy Christopoulos 22 saves / 23 shots		Goalie stats	Mitchell Weeks 17 saves / 20 shots

Toledo won series 4–0

=== Mountain Division ===
==== (1) Utah Grizzlies vs. (2) Rapid City Rush ====
May 6	Rapid City Rush	1–5	Utah Grizzlies	Maverik Center	Recap
No scoring		First period	0:19 – Kyle Betts (3); 8:02 – Nathan Clurman (1)
Logan Nelson (5) – 9:26		Second period	8:05 – Tarun Fizer (3); 17:26 – Charle-Edouard D'Astous (10)
No scoring		Third period	12:06 – pp – Dylan Fitze (2)
Lukáš Pařík 31 saves / 36 shots		Goalie stats	Trent Miner 33 saves / 34 shots

May 7	Rapid City Rush	4–5	Utah Grizzlies	Maverik Center	Recap
Colton Leiter (2) – pp – 2:23		First period	16:15 – pp – Charle-Edouard D'Astous (11)
Avery Peterson (3) – pp – 10:22; Avery Peterson (4) – pp – 17:18		Second period	No scoring
Stephen Baylis (2) – pp – 9:16		Third period	3:47 – Dylan Fitze (3); 13:48 – Dylan Fitze (4); 19:17 – pp – Nick Henry (1); 19:52 – pp – Charle-Edouard D'Astous (12)
Lukáš Pařík 36 saves / 41 shots		Goalie stats	Trent Miner 38 saves / 42 shots

May 9	Utah Grizzlies	6–2	Rapid City Rush	The Monument	Recap
Charle-Edouard D'Astous (13) – pp – 8:00; Charle-Edouard D'Astous (14) – 15:33; Nick Henry (2) – 19:12		First period	18:28 – pp – Calder Brooks (5)
No scoring		Second period	2:51 – Ryan Zuhlsdorf (1)
Charle-Edouard D'Astous (15) – pp – 10:49; Nick Henry (3) – 12:13; Luka Burzan (2) – 19:05		Third period	No scoring
Peyton Jones 44 saves / 46 shots		Goalie stats	Dillon Kelley 23 saves / 29 shots

May 10	Utah Grizzlies	5–6	OT	Rapid City Rush	The Monument	Recap
Kyle Betts (4) – sh – 12:01; Benjamin Tardif (3) – 17:12		First period		0:37 – Brett Gravelle (2); 17:26 – Zach Court (1)
Mason Mannek (3) – 4:16; Benjamin Tardif (4) – 8:50; Dakota Raabe (1) – 12:57		Second period		18:24 – pp – Logan Nelson (6); 19:43 – Logan Nelson (7)
No scoring		Third period		5:46 – Kyle Rhodes (1)
No scoring		First overtime period		13:57 – Logan Nelson (8)
Peyton Jones 38 saves / 44 shots		Goalie stats		Lukáš Pařík 38 saves / 43 shots

May 11	Utah Grizzlies	0–3	Rapid City Rush	The Monument	Recap
No scoring		First period	Gabriel Chabot (4) – pp – 7:45; Gabriel Chabot (5) – 17:18
No scoring		Second period	Alec Butcher (1) 5:50
No scoring		Third period	No scoring
Trent Miner 13 saves / 16 shots		Goalie stats	Lukáš Pařík 43 saves / 43 shots

May 16	Rapid City Rush	1–5	Utah Grizzlies	Maverik Center	Recap
No scoring		First period	Charle-Edouard D'Astous (16) – pp – 5:07
19:38 – pp – Brett Gravelle (3)		Second period	No scoring
No scoring		Third period	Charle-Edouard D'Astous (17) – 3:25; Luke Martin (1) – sh – 5:13; Dakota Raabe (2) – 12:20; Kyle Betts (5) – sh – en – 17:42
Lukáš Pařík 27 saves / 31 shots		Goalie stats	Trent Miner 32 saves / 33 shots

Utah won series 4–2

== Conference finals ==
=== Eastern Conference ===
==== (N2) Newfoundland Growlers vs. (S1) Florida Everblades ====
May 20	Florida Everblades	4–3	OT	Newfoundland Growlers	Mary Brown's Centre	Recap
No scoring		First period		3:16 – pp – Tyler Boland (13)
Jake Jaremko (2) – sh – 16:09; Jordan Sambrook (1) – 16:44		Second period		No scoring
Darik Angeli (2) – 6:35		Third period		5:19 – James Melindy (1); 13:43 – pp – Ryan Chyzowski (3)
Zach Solow (4) – pp – 4:47		First overtime period		No scoring
Cam Johnson 33 saves / 36 shots		Goalie stats		Keith Petruzzelli 30 saves / 34 shots

May 22	Florida Everblades	2–0	Newfoundland Growlers	Mary Brown's Centre	Recap
No scoring		First period	No scoring
Zach Solow (5) – 12:08		Second period	No scoring
Ben Masella (1) – en – 19:17		Third period	No scoring
Cam Johnson 25 saves / 25 shots		Goalie stats	Keith Petruzzelli 31 saves / 32 shots

May 25	Newfoundland Growlers	3–4	Florida Everblades	Hertz Arena	Recap
Orrin Centazzo (8) – 13:32		First period	0:26 – Alex Aleardi (4); 12:44 – pp – Stefan Leblanc (4)
Jeremy McKenna (4) – pp – 7:59		Second period	19:59 – Chris McKay (2)
Zach O'Brien (4) – 13:58		Third period	8:21 – Matteo Gennaro (6)
Keith Petruzzelli 32 saves / 36 shots		Goalie stats	Cam Johnson 25 saves / 28 shots

May 27	Newfoundland Growlers	4–1	Florida Everblades	Hertz Arena	Recap
Todd Skirving (2) – 10:33		First period	No scoring
Gordie Green (6) – 9:47		Second period	19:10 – Jordan Sambrook (2)
Gordie Green (7) – 16:38; Derian Plouffe (5) – en – 19:18		Third period	No scoring
Keith Petruzzelli 31 saves / 32 shots		Goalie stats	Cam Johnson 26 saves / 29 shots

May 28	Newfoundland Growlers	5–6	OT	Florida Everblades	Hertz Arena	Recap
7:13 – Tyler Boland (14); 11:56 – Pavel Gogolev (3)		First period		Alex Aleardi (5) – 2:52; Stefan Leblanc (5) – 3:21; Ben Masella (2) – 4:10
No scoring		Second period		Darik Angeli (3) – 12:43; Alex Aleardi (6) – pp – 14:58
11:49 – Jeremy McKenna (5); 13:57 – sh – Tyler Boland (15); 15:22 – Tyler Boland (16)		Third period		No scoring
No scoring		First overtime period		Xavier Bouchard (2) – 1:00
Keith Petruzzelli 21 saves / 27 shots		Goalie stats		Cam Johnson 20 saves / 25 shots

Florida won series 4–1

=== Western Conference ===
==== (C1) Toledo Walleye vs. (M1) Utah Grizzlies ====
May 20	Utah Grizzlies	5–4	OT	Toledo Walleye	Huntington Center	Recap
Tyler Penner (1) – 10:23		First period		19:28 – Randy Gazzola (1)
Benjamin Tardif (5) – 10:08; Kyle Pouncy (1) – 16:35		Second period		4:16 – Brandon Hawkins (10); 15:15 – pp – Brett McKenzie (3)
Dylan Fitze (5) – 6:22		Third period		15:22 – Brett McKenzie (4)
Charle-Edouard D'Astous (18) – pp – 8:12		First overtime period		No scoring
Trent Miner 35 saves / 39 shots		Goalie stats		Billy Christopoulos 29 saves / 34 shots

May 21	Utah Grizzlies	2–5	Toledo Walleye	Huntington Center	Recap
Luke Martin (2) – 12:08		First period	No scoring
Joey Colatarci (1) – 13:01		Second period	2:26 – T.J. Hensick (8); 5:15 – pp – Cam Clarke (3); 16:29 – pp – Matt Berry (3)
No scoring		Third period	1:24 – Brett McKenzie (5); 7:48 – Marcus Vela (2)
Trent Miner 35 saves / 40 shots		Goalie stats	Billy Christopoulos 23 saves / 25 shots

May 24	Toledo Walleye	5–4	Utah Grizzlies	Maverik Center	Recap
Brandon Hawkins (11) – 0:31; Mitchell Heard (1) – 4:24		First period	No scoring
Patrick Curry (6) – 6:29; T.J. Hensick (9) – pp – 10:48; Mitchell Heard (2) – pp – 11:26		Second period	1:54 – Charle-Edouard D'Astous (19); 14:36 – Zach Tsekos (2)
No scoring		Third period	2:40 – Dylan Fitze (6); 10:39 – Tyler Penner (2)
Billy Christopoulos 22 saves / 26 shots		Goalie stats	Peyton Jones 14 saves / 18 shots Trent Miner 10 saves / 11 shots

May 27	Toledo Walleye	5–4	OT	Utah Grizzlies	Maverik Center	Recap
No scoring		First period		10:05 – Trey Bradley (6); 10:28 – Tarun Fizer (4); 14:14 – Tyler Penner (3); 18:47 – Zach Tsekos (3)
John Albert (7) – pp – 8:21; Blake Hillman (1) – 17:04		Second period		No scoring
Patrick Curry (7) – pp – 14:54; Brett McKenzie (6) – 18:30		Third period		No scoring
Chris Martenet (2) – 5:01		First overtime period		No scoring
Billy Christopoulos 26 saves / 30 shots		Goalie stats		Peyton Jones 28 saves / 33 shots

May 28	Toledo Walleye	5–1	Utah Grizzlies	Maverik Center	Recap
16:13 – Brandon Hawkins (12)		First period	Mason Mannek (7) – 19:41
15:25 – T.J. Hensick (10)		Second period	No scoring
6:43 – Brett Boeing (2); 13:55 – Marcus Vela (3); 19:56 – en – Brandon Hawkins (13)		Third period	No scoring
Billy Christopoulos 32 saves / 33 shots		Goalie stats	Trent Miner 29 saves / 33 shots

Toledo won series 4–1

== Kelly Cup finals ==
=== (C1) Toledo Walleye vs. (S1) Florida Everblades ===
June 3	Florida Everblades	3–2	Toledo Walleye	Huntington Center	Recap
No scoring		First period	14:09 – Randy Gazzola (2); 18:04 – pp – John Albert (8)
Zach Solow (6) – pp – 12:36		Second period	No scoring
Alex Aleardi (7) – 6:45; Alex Aleardi (8) – 18:19		Third period	No scoring
Cam Johnson 33 saves / 35 shots		Goalie stats	Billy Christopoulos 37 saves / 40 shots

June 4	Florida Everblades	3–1	Toledo Walleye	Huntington Center	Recap
Levko Koper (3) – 3:30; Dylan Vander Esch (2) – sh – 12:19		First period	No scoring
Zach Solow (7) – pp – 15:52		Second period	No scoring
No scoring		Third period	8:55 – Marcus Vela (4)
Cam Johnson 29 saves / 30 shots		Goalie stats	Billy Christopoulos 18 saves / 21 shots

June 8	Toledo Walleye	4–1	Florida Everblades	Hertz Arena	Recap
John Albert (9) – pp – 11:00; Brandon Hawkins (14) – 13:25		First period	No scoring
Marcus Vela (5) – sh – 18:08		Second period	No scoring
Brandon Hawkins (15) – en – 16:13		Third period	17:01 – Levko Koper (4)
Billy Christopoulos 32 saves / 33 shots		Goalie stats	Cam Johnson 25 saves / 28 shots

June 10	Toledo Walleye	2–3	OT	Florida Everblades	Hertz Arena	Recap
Josh Dickinson (2) – 14:44		First period		8:21 – pp – Jake McLaughlin (1)
No scoring		Second period		No scoring
Matt Berry (4) – pp – 17:26		Third period		19:40 – Joe Pendenza (5)
No scoring		First overtime period		15:45 – Lukas Kälble (1)
Billy Christopoulos 44 saves / 47 shots		Goalie stats		Cam Johnson 40 saves / 42 shots

June 11	Toledo Walleye	2–4	Florida Everblades	Hertz Arena	Recap
4:07 – Matt Berry (5); 18:23 – pp – John Albert (10)		First period	Zach Solow (8) – pp – 8:12; Matteo Gennaro (7) – 10:57; Levko Koper (5) – 11:04; Zach Solow (9) – 18:51
No scoring		Second period	No scoring
No scoring		Third period	No scoring
Billy Christopoulos 18 saves / 22 shots		Goalie stats	Cam Johnson 36 saves / 38 shots

Florida won series 4–1

== Statistical leaders ==
=== Skaters ===
These are the top ten skaters based on points.

Player	Team	GP	G	A	Pts	+/–	PIM
Brandon Hawkins	Toledo Walleye	21	15	18	33	+12	22
Charle-Edouard D'Astous	Utah Grizzlies	18	19	11	30	+5	44
Benjamin Tardif	Utah Grizzlies	18	5	25	30	+2	18
T. J. Hensick	Toledo Walleye	21	10	18	28	+4	6
Tyler Boland	Newfoundland Growlers	19	16	9	25	+7	4
Ben Finkelstein	Newfoundland Growlers	18	5	20	25	+3	12
Trey Bradley	Utah Grizzlies	18	6	13	19	+1	6
Zach Solow	Florida Everblades	19	9	9	18	+3	6
Zach O'Brien	Newfoundland Growlers	13	4	14	18	−1	0
Noel Hoefenmayer	Newfoundland Growlers	19	4	14	18	+8	14

GP = Games played; G = Goals; A = Assists; Pts = Points; +/– = Plus/minus; PIM = Penalty minutes

=== Goaltending ===
This is a combined table of the top five goaltenders based on goals against average and the top five goaltenders based on save percentage, with at least 300 minutes played. The table is sorted by GAA, and the criteria for inclusion are bolded.

Player	Team	GP	W	L	OTL	SA	GA	GAA	SV%	SO	TOI
Cam Johnson	Florida Everblades	18	15	2	1	522	36	**1.90**	**0.931**	4	1,134
Samuel Harvey	Fort Wayne Komets	7	3	3	1	208	18	**2.46**	**0.913**	0	438
Billy Christopoulos	Toledo Walleye	21	13	5	3	626	54	**2.48**	**0.914**	1	1,305
Michael Houser	Cincinnati Cyclones	5	2	2	1	194	14	**2.59**	**0.928**	1	324
Trent Miner	Utah Grizzlies	13	7	6	0	439	35	**2.80**	**0.920**	0	749

GP = Games played; W = Wins; L = Losses; OTL = Overtime Losses; SA = Shots against; GA = Goals against; GAA = Goals against average; SV% = Save percentage; SO = Shutouts; TOI = Time on ice (in minutes)

== See also ==
- 2021–22 ECHL season
- List of ECHL seasons
