= Trent Miner =

Canadian ice hockey player (born 2001)

- Born: February 5, 2001 (age 25) Brandon, Manitoba, Canada
- Height: 6 ft 1 in (185 cm)
- Weight: 185 lb (84 kg; 13 st 3 lb)
- Position: Goaltender
- Catches: Left
- NHL team (P) Cur. team: Colorado Avalanche; Colorado Eagles (AHL)
- NHL draft: 202nd overall, 2019; Colorado Avalanche
- Playing career: 2021–present

Trent Miner (born February 5, 2001) is a Canadian professional ice hockey player who is a goaltender for the Colorado Eagles of the American Hockey League (AHL) while under contract to the Colorado Avalanche of the National Hockey League (NHL).

== Playing career ==
Miner was selected in the seventh-round, 202nd overall, by the Colorado Avalanche in the 2019 NHL entry draft. During the 2024–25 season, Miner made his NHL debut on November 15, 2024, in relief in the second period of Colorado's 5–2 loss to the Washington Capitals, where he played 34:58 and turned aside 12 of the 13 shots he faced. Miner recorded his first NHL career win and first NHL shutout during a 4–0 win against the Columbus Blue Jackets on January 10, 2026, after saving 29 shots.

== Career statistics ==
			Regular season									Playoffs
Season	Team	League	GP	W	L	OTL	MIN	GA	SO	GAA	SV%	GP	W	L	MIN	GA	SO	GAA	SV%
2016–17	Brandon Wheat Kings U18	MMHL	25	—	—	—	—	—	4	2.64	.911	5	—	—	—	—	2	4.20	.876
2017–18	Brandon Wheat Kings U18	MMHL	20	—	—	—	—	—	2	1.64	.941	—	—	—	—	—	—	—	—
2017–18	Vancouver Giants	WHL	9	3	4	0	457	32	0	4.20	.885	3	1	2	123	7	0	3.41	.901
2018–19	Vancouver Giants	WHL	32	24	5	1	1876	62	3	1.98	.924	6	4	2	330	15	1	2.73	.885
2019–20	Vancouver Giants	WHL	28	14	11	3	1609	74	1	2.76	.901	—	—	—	—	—	—	—	—
2020–21	Colorado Eagles	AHL	6	2	3	1	336	16	1	2.86	.903	—	—	—	—	—	—	—	—
2020–21	Vancouver Giants	WHL	15	7	8	0	832	30	4	2.16	.915	—	—	—	—	—	—	—	—
2021–22	Utah Grizzlies	ECHL	28	16	12	0	1569	71	7	2.72	.910	13	7	6	749	35	0	2.80	.920
2021–22	Colorado Eagles	AHL	5	2	3	0	274	12	0	2.63	.899	—	—	—	—	—	—	—	—
2022–23	Utah Grizzlies	ECHL	37	17	15	3	2152	109	3	3.04	.910	6	2	4	369	17	1	2.76	.926
2022–23	Colorado Eagles	AHL	1	0	0	0	20	0	0	0.00	1.000	—	—	—	—	—	—	—	—
2023–24	Colorado Eagles	AHL	18	9	6	1	999	35	1	2.10	.930	—	—	—	—	—	—	—	—
2023–24	Utah Grizzlies	ECHL	11	6	5	0	655	30	0	2.75	.917	—	—	—	—	—	—	—	—
2024–25	Colorado Eagles	AHL	38	22	10	6	2259	80	3	2.12	.918	9	5	4	559	20	0	2.15	.925
2024–25	Colorado Avalanche	NHL	2	0	1	0	92	4	0	2.62	.879	—	—	—	—	—	—	—	—
2025–26	Colorado Eagles	AHL	32	17	8	5	1831	80	1	2.62	.904	17	11	6	1029	32	4	1.87	.925
2025–26	Colorado Avalanche	NHL	4	1	0	3	237	7	1	2.03	.933	—	—	—	—	—	—	—	—
NHL totals			6	1	1	3	328	11	1	2.19	.920	—	—	—	—	—	—	—	—

== Awards and honours ==
Award	Year
MMHL
First All-Star Team	2018
