= 2021–22 ECHL season =

Ice hockey league season

- League: ECHL
- Sport: Ice hockey
- Duration: October 21, 2021 – April 17, 2022

Regular season
- Brabham Cup: Toledo Walleye
- Season MVP: Will Graber (Fort Wayne)
- Top scorer: Will Graber (Fort Wayne)

Playoffs
- Playoffs MVP: Cam Johnson (Florida)

Kelly Cup
- Champions: Florida Everblades
- Runners-up: Toledo Walleye

ECHL seasons
- 2020–21 2022–23

The 2021–22 ECHL season was the 34th season of the ECHL. The regular season was scheduled to run from October 21, 2021, to April 17, 2022, with the Kelly Cup playoffs to follow. Twenty-seven teams in 20 states and two Canadian provinces were each scheduled to play 72 games. The Florida Everblades were the 2022 Kelly Cup champions when they defeated the Toledo Walleye in five games in the Kelly Cup championship.

== League business ==
=== League changes ===
Following the delayed and COVID-19 pandemic affected season that led to 12 teams going on hiatus before starting the season, the league returned to its typical season start date in October with 27 teams participating. The league also returned to a two-conference, four-division alignment.

=== Team changes ===
- Eleven of the twelve teams that opted out of participating in the previous season returned: the Adirondack Thunder, Atlanta Gladiators, Cincinnati Cyclones, Idaho Steelheads, Kalamazoo Wings, Maine Mariners, Newfoundland Growlers, Norfolk Admirals, Reading Royals, Toledo Walleye, and Worcester Railers.
- The Brampton Beast announced the team had ceased operations entirely on February 18, 2021, after originally opting out of the season.
- The league added two expansion teams: the Iowa Heartlanders in Coralville, Iowa, and the Trois-Rivières Lions in Trois-Rivières, Quebec.

=== Affiliation changes ===
ECHL team	New affiliates	Former affiliates
Adirondack Thunder	Utica Comets (AHL)	Binghamton Devils (AHL)
Allen Americans	Seattle Kraken (NHL); Charlotte Checkers (AHL)	Minnesota Wild (NHL); Iowa Wild (AHL)
Atlanta Gladiators	Ottawa Senators (NHL); Belleville Senators (AHL)	Boston Bruins (NHL); Providence Bruins
Iowa Heartlanders	Minnesota Wild (NHL); Iowa Wild (AHL)	Expansion team
Jacksonville Icemen	New York Rangers (NHL); Hartford Wolf Pack (AHL)	Winnipeg Jets (NHL); Manitoba Moose (AHL)
Kalamazoo Wings	Columbus Blue Jackets (NHL); Cleveland Monsters (AHL)	Vancouver Canucks (NHL); Utica Comets (AHL)
Maine Mariners	Boston Bruins (NHL); Providence Bruins (AHL)	New York Rangers (NHL); Hartford Wolf Pack (AHL)
Norfolk Admirals	Carolina Hurricanes (NHL); Chicago Wolves (AHL)	Independent
Trois-Rivières Lions	Montreal Canadiens (NHL); Laval Rocket (AHL)	Expansion team

=== All-star game ===
During the 2019–20 season, the league had awarded the Jacksonville Icemen the 2021 All-Star Game, but the Jacksonville-hosted event was deferred to 2022. The All-Star Game returned to its previous format of an ECHL All-Star team playing against the host team. Additionally, there was a skills competition composed of fastest skater, hardest shot, and accuracy shooting events. Similar to the 2020 All-Star festivities, players from the Professional Women's Hockey Players Association (PWHPA) and the Premier Hockey Federation (PHF), formerly the National Women's Hockey League 2021, participated in both the skills events and as members of the All-Star team in the game. The selected players were the PWHPA's Sophia Shaver and Loren Gabel from the PWHPA and Allie Thunstrom and Jillian Dempsey from the PHF.

The All-Star Classic was held on January 17, 2022. The skills competition took place during the All-Star Game with the winner of each competition earning a goal toward their team's final score. Jacksonville earned all three points with Ben Hawerchuk winning the fastest skater, Croix Evingson winning the hardest shot, and Derek Lodermeier winning the accuracy shooting event. The ECHL All-Star team went on to defeat Jacksonville 14–7. The Kansas City Mavericks' Marcus Crawford was named the tournament's Most Valuable Player by scoring three goals and an assist.

== Standings ==
Due to the imbalanced schedule and canceled games during the pandemic, teams are ranked on points percentage.

Final standings

=== Eastern Conference ===
North Division	GP	W	L	OTL	SOL	GF	GA	Pts	Pts%
y – Reading Royals (PHI)	71	45	17	7	2	258	201	99	0.697
x – Newfoundland Growlers (TOR)	67	42	20	4	1	262	191	89	0.664
x – Trois-Rivières Lions (MTL)	69	34	29	5	1	230	233	74	0.536
x – Maine Mariners (BOS)	72	33	31	5	3	230	236	74	0.514
Worcester Railers (NYI)	71	32	32	5	2	227	245	71	0.500
Adirondack Thunder (NJD)	71	27	40	4	0	202	272	58	0.408

South Division	GP	W	L	OTL	SOL	GF	GA	Pts	Pts%
y – Florida Everblades (NSH)	72	42	20	6	4	243	187	94	0.653
x – Atlanta Gladiators (OTT)	72	43	24	4	1	220	198	91	0.632
x – Jacksonville Icemen (NYR)	72	40	27	3	2	206	185	85	0.590
x – Greenville Swamp Rabbits (FLA)	72	33	29	6	4	210	209	76	0.528
Orlando Solar Bears (TBL)	71	33	31	6	1	197	226	73	0.514
Norfolk Admirals (CAR)	72	29	37	3	3	204	261	64	0.444
South Carolina Stingrays (WSH)	72	28	38	6	0	187	238	62	0.431

=== Western Conference ===
Central Division	GP	W	L	OTL	SOL	GF	GA	Pts	Pts%
z – Toledo Walleye (DET)	72	49	19	2	2	277	203	102	0.708
x – Fort Wayne Komets (VGK)	72	40	25	6	1	267	225	87	0.604
x – Wheeling Nailers (PIT)	72	37	31	4	0	243	247	78	0.542
x – Cincinnati Cyclones (BUF)	72	36	32	3	1	243	239	76	0.528
Kalamazoo Wings (CBJ)	72	36	35	1	0	224	255	73	0.507
Indy Fuel (CHI)	72	34	33	2	3	232	233	73	0.507
Iowa Heartlanders (MIN)	72	29	33	9	1	229	263	68	0.472

Mountain Division	GP	W	L	OTL	SOL	GF	GA	Pts	Pts%
y – Utah Grizzlies (COL)	72	42	27	2	1	240	225	87	0.604
x – Rapid City Rush (ARI)	72	36	25	6	5	241	232	83	0.576
x – Allen Americans (SEA)	72	35	28	8	1	240	244	79	0.549
x – Tulsa Oilers (ANA)	72	36	30	3	3	220	220	78	0.542
Idaho Steelheads (DAL)	72	36	33	2	1	216	191	75	0.521
Kansas City Mavericks (CGY)	72	32	33	5	2	210	243	71	0.493
Wichita Thunder (EDM)	72	27	36	9	0	202	258	63	0.438

x - clinched playoff spot, y - clinched regular season division title, z - Brabham Cup (regular season) champion

== Statistical leaders ==
=== Scoring leaders ===
The following players are sorted by points, then goals.

GP = Games played; G = Goals; A = Assists; Pts = Points; PIM = Penalty minutes

Player	Team	GP	G	A	Pts	PIM
Will Graber	Fort Wayne Komets	59	26	57	83	81
Zach O'Brien	Newfoundland Growlers	53	28	50	78	4
T. J. Hensick	Toledo Walleye	65	22	56	78	24
Patrick Watling	Wheeling Nailers	55	31	46	77	32
Kris Bennett	Iowa Heartlanders	50	35	38	73	38
Chad Costello	Allen Americans	66	26	47	72	4
Jesse Schultz	Cincinnati Cyclones	71	23	48	71	65
Blake Winiecki	Florida Everblades	68	33	37	70	62
Darik Angeli	Kansas City/Florida	63	29	41	70	56
John McCarron	Florida Everblades	69	29	41	70	101

=== Leading goaltenders ===
GP = Games played; TOI = Time on ice (in minutes); SA = Shots against; GA = Goals against; SO = Shutouts; GAA = Goals against average; SV% = Save percentage; W = Wins; L = Losses; OTL = Overtime/shootout loss

Player	Team	GP	TOI	SA	GA	SO	GAA	SV%	W	L	OTL
Keith Petruzzelli	Newfoundland Growlers	23	1372	631	46	5	2.01	.927	16	6	1
Tyler Parks	Atlanta Gladiators	23	1376	711	49	2	2.14	.931	16	4	3
François Brassard	Jacksonville Icemen	31	1863	768	68	1	2.19	.911	19	9	3
Parker Gahagen	Florida Everblades	35	2043	937	79	4	2.32	.916	20	10	5
Logan Flodell	South Carolina/Reading	19	1107	525	43	1	2.33	.918	12	5	2

== Postseason ==
=== Playoffs format ===
The league announced its playoff format on January 21, 2022. At the end of the regular season, the top four teams in each division qualify for the 2022 Kelly Cup playoffs and are seeded one through four based on the highest points percentage earned in the season. Then the first two rounds of the playoffs are held within the division with the first seed facing the fourth seed and the second seed facing the third. The division champions then play each other in a conference championship. The Kelly Cup finals pit the Eastern Conference champion against the Western Conference champion. All four rounds are a best-of-seven format.

=== Bracket ===
Division Semifinals	Division Finals
N1	Reading	4
N4	Maine	2
N1	Reading	3
N2	Newfoundland	4
N2	Newfoundland	4
N3	Trois-Rivières	3
North Division
S1	Florida	4
S4	Greenville	2
S1	Florida	4
S3	Jacksonville	0
S2	Atlanta	0
S3	Jacksonville	4
C1	Toledo	4
C4	Cincinnati	3
C1	Toledo	4
C3	Wheeling	0
C2	Fort Wayne	3
C3	Wheeling	4
South Division
M1	Utah	4
M4	Tulsa	3
M1	Utah	4
M2	Rapid City	2
M2	Rapid City	4
M3	Allen	1

Conference Finals
N2	Newfoundland	1
S1	Florida	4
C1	Toledo	4
M1	Utah	1

Kelly Cup Finals
S1	Florida	4
C1	Toledo	1

== See also ==
- List of ECHL seasons
- 2021 in sports
- 2022 in sports
