= Peter W. Bates =

American mathematician

Peter W. Bates is a professor of mathematics at Michigan State University.

Bates received his Ph.D. from the University of Utah in 1976.

In 2012, Bates became an inaugural fellow of the American Mathematical Society.
