= Indy Fuel =

Minor league ice hockey team based in Fishers, Indiana, US

- City: Fishers, Indiana
- League: ECHL
- Conference: Western
- Division: Central
- Founded: 2014
- Home arena: Fishers Event Center
- Colors: Red, gold, black, white
- Owners: Jim Hallet (Owner, Chairman) Sean Hallet (CEO)
- Head coach: Jesse Messier
- Affiliates: Chicago Blackhawks (NHL); Rockford IceHogs (AHL)
- Website: indyfuelhockey.com

Franchise history
- 2014–present: Indy Fuel

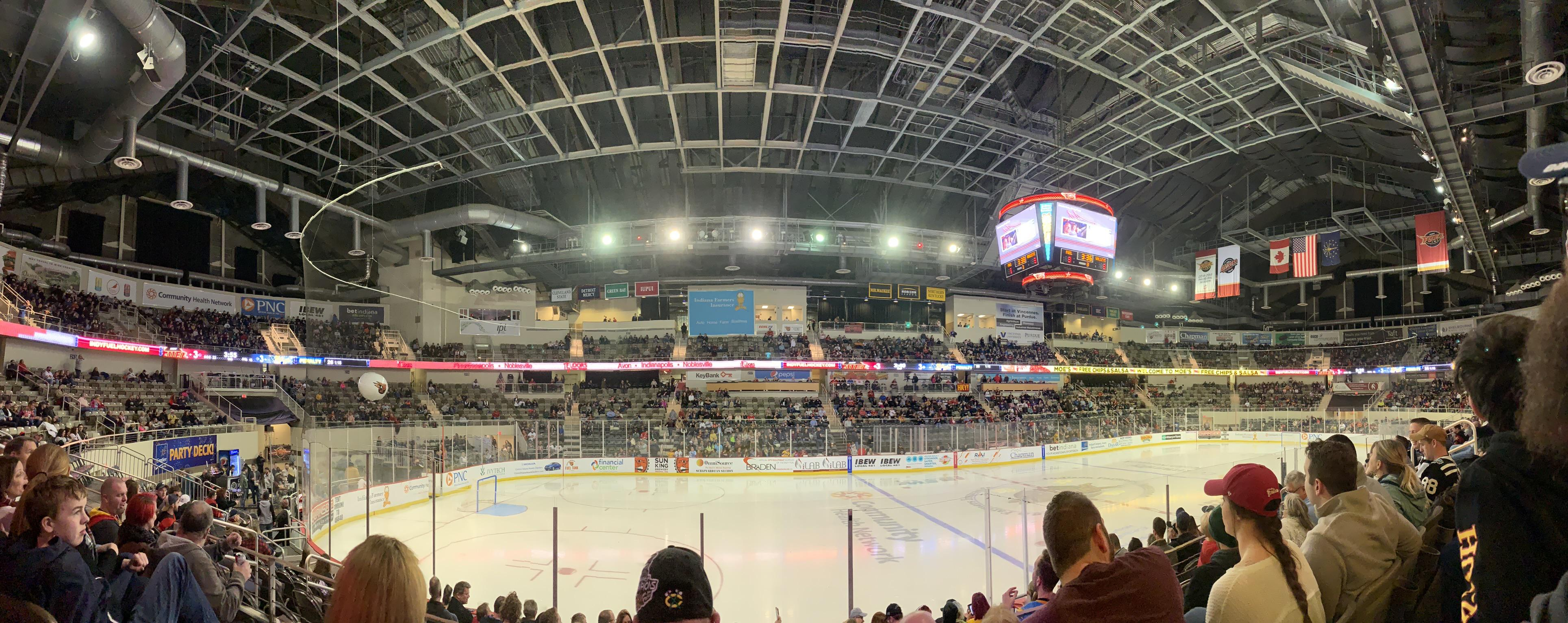
Immediately before the third period at a Fuel game versus the Toledo Walleye, March 6, 2020

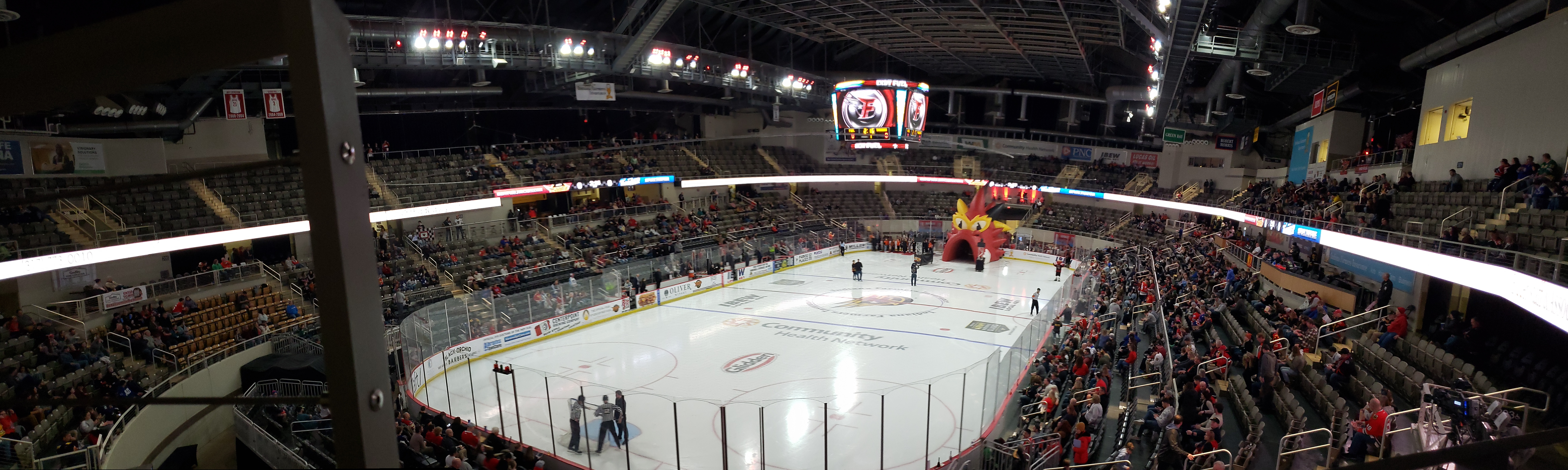
The Fuel about to take the ice before a match against the Wichita Thunder on February 23, 2024, their final season in Indiana Farmers Coliseum

The Indy Fuel are a minor league ice hockey team in the ECHL that began play in the 2014–15 season. Based in Fishers, Indiana, the Fuel play their home games at the Fishers Event Center, after having started play at the Indiana Farmers Coliseum on the Indiana State Fairgrounds. They are affiliated with the NHL's Chicago Blackhawks and the AHL's Rockford IceHogs.

== History ==
On November 11, 2013, the ECHL's board of governors approved the expansion membership application of the Indy Fuel for admission to the league for the 2014–15 season. From 2013 to 2024, the club was based in Indianapolis, and played home games at the Indiana Farmers Coliseum on the Indiana State Fairgrounds.

On October 17, 2014, the Fuel played their franchise opening game against the Fort Wayne Komets, reigniting the Indianapolis-Fort Wayne rivalry after 15 years in a 4–5 defeat.

On March 7, 2016, the Indy Fuel fired inaugural head coach Scott Hillman and named Bernie John as interim head coach for the remainder of the 2015–16 season. On April 8, 2016, the interim tag was removed and John was named head coach and vice president of hockey operations for the 2016–17 season.

At the end of the 2017–18 regular season, the Fuel qualified for their first playoff berth. Entering as a fourth seed in the Central Division with 78 points, they were swept by the Toledo Walleye in the division semifinals. The team failed to qualify for the playoffs in the following 2018–19 season and the team released head coach Bernie John. The Fuel hired Doug Christiansen as the general manager and head coach for the 2019–20 season following his first season as head coach of the Manchester Monarchs.

On September 14, 2022, it was announced that the Fuel would be moving to the Fishers Event Center, a new 8,500-seat arena to be built in Fishers, Indiana, in time for the 2024–25 season.

The team practices at the Indy Fuel Tank, an indoor ice rink in Fishers, Indiana.

On February 23, 2024, Eva Hallman became the first female broadcaster for the team. She joined long-time Indy Fuel play-by-play Andrew Smith in the booth.

On December 6, 2024, Indy opened the New Fishers Event Center in a loss to the Iowa Heartlanders, 4–3.

Hallman made more history with the team by becoming the first woman to call an Indy Fuel game in franchise history. She called a 4–3 overtime loss against the Fort Wayne Komets on November 28, 2025.

== Season-by-season records ==
Indy Fuel season-by-season records
Regular season											Playoffs				
Season	GP	W	L	OTL	SOL	Pts	GF	GA	PIM	Standing	Year	1st round	2nd round	3rd round	Kelly Cup
2014–15	72	31	30	4	7	73	197	221	1,026	6th, North	2015	did not qualify			
2015–16	72	32	36	4	0	68	174	201	786	4th, Midwest	2016	did not qualify			
2016–17	72	23	42	3	4	53	196	290	849	6th, Central	2017	did not qualify			
2017–18	72	36	30	5	1	78	242	248	1,195	4th, Central	2018	L, 0–4, TOL	—	—	—
2018–19	72	35	32	2	3	75	230	247	1,032	5th, Central	2019	did not qualify			
2019–20	60	30	26	2	2	64	195	175	698	4th, Central	2020	Season abandoned due to the COVID-19 pandemic			
2020–21	69	37	24	8	0	82	204	199	1,002	3rd, Eastern	2021	—	L, 1–3, GRN	—	—
2021–22	72	34	33	2	3	73	232	233	1,093	6th, Central	2022	did not qualify			
2022–23	72	43	24	5	0	91	244	208	1,031	3rd, Central	2023	L, 0–4 TOL	—	—	—
2023–24	72	39	25	6	2	86	230	221	1,055	2nd, Central	2024	L, 1–4, WHL	—	—	—
2024–25	72	32	30	5	5	74	180	195	975	4th, Central	2025	L, 0–4, TOL	—	—	—
2025–26	72	34	27	10	1	79	182	190	796	4th, Central	2026	L, 1–4, FW	—	—	—

== Players and staff ==
=== Notable players ===
List of Indy Fuel alumni that advanced to play in the NHL and first NHL team they appeared with:

Updated November 29, 2025.

- Collin Delia (2017–18), Chicago Blackhawks
- Justin Holl (2014–15), Toronto Maple Leafs
- Kevin Lankinen (2018–19), Chicago Blackhawks
- Matt Tomkins (2017–19), Tampa Bay Lightning

Indy Fuel players that played in the NHL before playing with the team:

- Cédrick Desjardins
- Cameron Hillis

=== Notable staff ===
Eva Hallman was the first woman to call games for Indy Fuel.
