= 2026–27 ECHL season =

American ice hockey season

- League: ECHL
- Sport: Ice hockey
- Duration: October 16, 2026 – April 11, 2027

Regular season

Playoffs

Kelly Cup

ECHL seasons
- ← 2025–26 2027–28 →

The 2026–27 ECHL season is the 39th season of the ECHL. The regular season began on October 16, 2026, and is scheduled to end on April 11, 2027, with the 2027 Kelly Cup playoffs starting shortly after. Thirty teams affiliated with NHL teams in 22 states and one Canadian province are scheduled to play 72 regular-season games.

== Membership changes ==
In May 2025, the ECHL announced it would award an expansion franchise to Rio Rancho, New Mexico, marking the return of professional hockey to the state. The team would be named the New Mexico Goatheads. The name Goatheads, a thorny seed shaped like a goat's head, was selected in a fan contest. The team will be based out of the Rio Rancho Events Center.

On March 9, 2026, the ECHL Board of Governors approved the voluntary suspension of operations for the Iowa Heartlanders.

The Utah Grizzlies were sold and relocated to the CURE Insurance Arena in Trenton, New Jersey and were renamed the Trenton Ironhawks after the Utah Mammoth of the NHL, which had begun play in the area prior to the 2024-25 season. The league announced the change on July 23, 2025. The team's nickname, the Ironhawks, was announced on January 13, 2026.

The Augusta Lynx will join the league for the 2027-28 season. The team was originally announced on August 20, 2025, but will not start play until 2027-28 due to construction of the New Augusta Arena. It is replacing the demolished James Brown Arena, and is not due to be completed until spring 2027, and is located on the former arena site.

=== Affiliation changes ===
ECHL team	New affiliates	Former affiliates
Bloomington Bison	Winnipeg Jets (NHL) Manitoba Moose (AHL)	New York Rangers (NHL) Hartford Wolf Pack (AHL)
Florida Everblades	Pittsburgh Penguins (NHL) Wilkes-Barre/Scranton Penguins (AHL)	St. Louis Blues (NHL) Springfield Thunderbirds (AHL)
Iowa Heartlanders	Inactive	Minnesota Wild (NHL) Iowa Wild (AHL)
Jacksonville Icemen	Minnesota Wild (NHL) Iowa Wild (AHL)	Buffalo Sabres (NHL) Rochester Americans (AHL)
New Mexico Goatheads	Colorado Avalanche (NHL) Colorado Eagles (AHL)	Expansion Team
Norfolk Admirals	Independent	Winnipeg Jets (NHL) Manitoba Moose (AHL)
Trenton Ironhawks	New York Islanders (NHL) Hamilton Hammers (AHL)	Colorado Avalanche (NHL) Colorado Eagles (AHL)
Wheeling Nailers	Columbus Blue Jackets (NHL) Cleveland Monsters (AHL)	Pittsburgh Penguins (NHL) Wilkes-Barre/Scranton Penguins (AHL)
Worcester Railers	St. Louis Blues (NHL) Springfield Thunderbirds (AHL)	New York Islanders (NHL) Bridgeport Islanders (AHL)

== Teams ==
Alignment, affiliations, and locations for the 2026–27 season.

Conference	Division	Team	City	Arena	Capacity	Founded	Joined	Current city since	Head coach	NHL affiliate	AHL affiliate
Eastern	North	Adirondack Thunder	Glens Falls, New York	Harding Mazzotti Arena	4,794	1990*		2015	Sylvain Cloutier	New Jersey Devils	Utica Comets
Eastern	North	Greensboro Gargoyles	Greensboro, North Carolina	First Horizon Coliseum	22,000	2024	2025		Mitch Giguère	Carolina Hurricanes	Chicago Wolves
Eastern	North	Maine Mariners	Portland, Maine	Cross Insurance Arena	6,206	1989*	2003	2018	Rick Kowalsky	Boston Bruins	Providence Bruins
Eastern	North	Norfolk Admirals	Norfolk, Virginia	Norfolk Scope	8,701	1995*	2003	2015	Jeff Carr	Independent	
Eastern	North	Reading Royals	Reading, Pennsylvania	Santander Arena	6,500	1991*		2001	Anthony Peters	Philadelphia Flyers	Lehigh Valley Phantoms
Eastern	North	Trenton Ironhawks	Trenton, New Jersey	CURE Insurance Arena	7,605	1981*	1988	2026	Chuck Weber	New York Islanders	Hamilton Hammers
Eastern	North	Trois-Rivières Lions	Trois-Rivières, Quebec	Colisée Vidéotron	4,390	2021			Ron Choules	Montreal Canadiens	Laval Rocket
Eastern	North	Worcester Railers	Worcester, Massachusetts	DCU Center	12,135	2017			Nick Tuzzolino	St. Louis Blues	Springfield Thunderbirds
Eastern	South	Atlanta Gladiators	Duluth, Georgia	Gas South Arena	11,355	1995*		2015	Matt Ginn	Nashville Predators	Milwaukee Admirals
Eastern	South	Florida Everblades	Estero, Florida	Hertz Arena	7,084	1998			Brad Ralph	Pittsburgh Penguins	Wilkes-Barre/Scranton Penguins
Eastern	South	Greenville Swamp Rabbits	Greenville, South Carolina	Bon Secours Wellness Arena	13,951	1987*	1988	2010	Chad Costello	Los Angeles Kings	Ontario Reign
Eastern	South	Jacksonville Icemen	Jacksonville, Florida	VyStar Veterans Memorial Arena	13,141	1992*	2012	2017	Sean Teakle	Minnesota Wild	Iowa Wild
Eastern	South	Orlando Solar Bears	Orlando, Florida	Kia Center	17,353	2012			Matt Macdonald	Tampa Bay Lightning	Syracuse Crunch
Eastern	South	Savannah Ghost Pirates	Savannah, Georgia	Enmarket Arena	7,485	2022			Jared Staal	Florida Panthers	Charlotte Checkers
Eastern	South	South Carolina Stingrays	North Charleston, South Carolina	North Charleston Coliseum	10,537	1993			Jesse Kallechy	Washington Capitals	Hershey Bears
Western	Central	Bloomington Bison	Bloomington, Illinois	Grossinger Motors Arena	7,000	2024			Phillip Barski	Winnipeg Jets	Manitoba Moose
Western	Central	Cincinnati Cyclones	Cincinnati, Ohio	Heritage Bank Center	14,453	1995*		2001	Riley Weselowski	Toronto Maple Leafs	Toronto Marlies
Western	Central	Fort Wayne Komets	Fort Wayne, Indiana	Allen County War Memorial Coliseum	10,480	1985*	2012		Ben Boudreau	Edmonton Oilers	Bakersfield Condors
Western	Central	Indy Fuel	Fishers, Indiana	Fishers Event Center	7,500	2014			Duncan Dalmao	Chicago Blackhawks	Rockford IceHogs
Western	Central	Kalamazoo Wings	Kalamazoo, Michigan	Wings Event Center	5,113	1999*	2009		Joel Martin	Vancouver Canucks	Abbotsford Canucks
Western	Central	Toledo Walleye	Toledo, Ohio	Huntington Center	7,389	1991			Pat Mikesch	Detroit Red Wings	Grand Rapids Griffins
Western	Central	Wheeling Nailers	Wheeling, West Virginia	WesBanco Arena	5,406	1981*	1988	1992	Nate DiCasmirro	Columbus Blue Jackets	Cleveland Monsters
Western	Mountain	Allen Americans	Allen, Texas	Credit Union of Texas Event Center	6,275	2009	2014		Steve Martinson	Ottawa Senators	Belleville Senators
Western	Mountain	Idaho Steelheads	Boise, Idaho	Idaho Central Arena	5,002	1997	2003		Everett Sheen	Dallas Stars	Texas Stars
Western	Mountain	Kansas City Mavericks	Independence, Missouri	Cable Dahmer Arena	5,800	2009	2014		Tad O'Had	Seattle Kraken	Coachella Valley Firebirds
Western	Mountain	Rapid City Rush	Rapid City, South Dakota	The Monument	7,500	2008	2014		Dave Smith	Calgary Flames	Calgary Wranglers
Western	Mountain	New Mexico Goatheads	Rio Rancho, New Mexico	Rio Rancho Events Center	6,000	2025	2026		Zack Stortini	Colorado Avalanche	Colorado Eagles
Western	Mountain	Tahoe Knight Monsters	Stateline, Nevada	Tahoe Blue Event Center	4,200	2024			Connor Jones	Vegas Golden Knights	Henderson Silver Knights
Western	Mountain	Tulsa Oilers	Tulsa, Oklahoma	BOK Center	17,096	1992	2014		Rob Murray	Anaheim Ducks	San Diego Gulls
Western	Mountain	Wichita Thunder	Wichita, Kansas	Intrust Bank Arena	13,450	1992	2014		Bruce Ramsay	San Jose Sharks	San Jose Barracuda

=== Future teams ===
Announced Future ECHL teams
Team	City	Arena	Capacity	Founded	Joining	Head coach	NHL affiliate	AHL affiliate
Augusta Lynx	Augusta, Georgia	New Augusta Arena	8,720	2025	2027	TBD	TBD	TBD

=== Inactive teams ===
Announced Future ECHL teams
Team	City	Arena	Capacity	Founded	Joined	Last played	Head coach	NHL affiliate	AHL affiliate
Iowa Heartlanders	Coralville, Iowa	Xtream Arena	4,878	2021	2021	2025-26	N/A	N/A	N/A

== Standings ==
To be added upon completion of the regular season.

== 2027 Kelly Cup playoffs ==
The top four teams in each division at the end of the regular season advance to the 2027 Kelly Cup playoffs and are seeded 1 through 4 based on their end-of-season division ranking. Each round is a best-of-seven series with the winner advancing to the next round. The first two rounds are played between teams in the same division, with the first seed facing the fourth seed and the second seed facing the third seed. The winners of each division then play off to determine the conference winners.

== See also ==
- List of ECHL seasons
