= List of professional sports teams in Nevada =

Nevada is the 32nd most populated state in the United States and has a rich history of professional sports.

== Active teams ==
=== Major league teams ===
Nevada is home to two major professional sports teams. Both of the teams are located in Paradise, which is a suburb of Las Vegas.

American football
League	Team	City	Stadium	Capacity
NFL	Las Vegas Raiders	Paradise	Allegiant Stadium	65,000
Ice hockey
League	Team	City	Arena	Capacity
NHL	Vegas Golden Knights	Paradise	T-Mobile Arena	17,500

=== Other professional sports teams ===
Arena football
League	Team	City	Arena	Capacity
IFL	Vegas Knight Hawks	Henderson	Lee's Family Forum	5,567
Baseball
League	Team	City	Stadium	Capacity
PCL (AAA)	Las Vegas Aviators	Summerlin	Las Vegas Ballpark	8,196
PCL (AAA)	Reno Aces	Reno	Greater Nevada Field	9,013
Basketball
League	Team	City	Arena	Capacity
WNBA	Las Vegas Aces	Paradise	Michelob Ultra Arena	12,000
Ice hockey
League	Team	City	Arena	Capacity
AHL	Henderson Silver Knights	Henderson	Lee's Family Forum	5,567
ECHL	Tahoe Knight Monsters	Stateline	Tahoe Blue Event Center	5,000
Lacrosse
League	Team	City	Arena	Capacity
NLL	Las Vegas Desert Dogs	Henderson	Lee's Family Forum	5,567
Soccer
League	Team	City	Stadium	Capacity
USLC	Las Vegas Lights FC	Las Vegas	Cashman Field	9,334
Ultimate
League	Team	City	Stadium	Capacity
UFA	Vegas Bighorns	Las Vegas	Bengals Stadium at Bonanza High School	5,000

=== Map of cities with a professional sports team ===
Location with a professional sports team

== See also ==
- Sports in Nevada
