= 2026 Kelly Cup playoffs =

American ice hockey postseason

Tournament details
- Dates: April 23 to June 15
- Teams: 16

Final positions
- Champions: Florida Everblades
- Runners-up: Kansas City Mavericks

Awards
- MVP: Cam Johnson

The 2026 Kelly Cup playoffs were for the ECHL hockey league as they started on April 23, 2026, following the conclusion of the 2025–26 ECHL regular season. The postseason then concluded on June 15, with the Florida Everblades winning their league record fifth overall Kelly Cup championship over the Kansas City Mavericks in six games.

== Playoff format ==
The top four teams in each division qualified for the playoffs based on the highest point total earned in the regular season. The entire first two rounds of the playoffs are held within the division, with the first seed facing the fourth seed and the second seed facing the third. The division champions then play each other in a conference championship. The Kelly Cup finals pit the Eastern Conference champion against the Western Conference champion. All four rounds are a best-of-seven format. The Kansas City Mavericks secured the top record by clinching the Brabham Cup, and are scheduled to have home-ice advantage throughout the playoffs if they keep advancing. In total, nine of the 16 playoff teams are repeats from the previous season, which includes Toledo, who is on a 10-season playoff streak.

== Playoff seeds ==
After the regular season, 16 teams qualified for the playoffs.

Final seeds and points:

=== Eastern Conference ===
==== North Division ====
- Wheeling Nailers – Division champions – 98 points
- Maine Mariners – 93 points
- Adirondack Thunder – 85 points
- Reading Royals – 82 points

==== South Division ====
- Florida Everblades – Division champions – 108 points
- South Carolina Stingrays – 94 points
- Atlanta Gladiators – 93 points
- Savannah Ghost Pirates – 74 points

=== Western Conference ===
==== Central Division ====
- Fort Wayne Komets – Division champions – 100 points
- Toledo Walleye – 98 points
- Bloomington Bison – 79 points
- Indy Fuel – 79 points

==== Mountain Division ====
- Kansas City Mavericks – Brabham Cup winners, Division champions – 115 points
- Allen Americans – 92 points
- Idaho Steelheads – 91 points
- Tahoe Knight Monsters – 77 points

== Playoff bracket ==
Division Semifinals	Division Finals
N1	Wheeling	4
N4	Reading	1
N1	Wheeling	4
North Division
N2	Maine	3
N2	Maine	4
N3	Adirondack	3
Eastern Conference
S1	Florida	4
S4	Savannah	0
S1	Florida	4
South Division
S2	South Carolina	1
S2	South Carolina	4
S3	Atlanta	2
C1	Fort Wayne	4
C4	Indy	1
C1	Fort Wayne	4
Central Division
C2	Toledo	2
C2	Toledo	4
C3	Bloomington	2
Western Conference
M1	Kansas City	4
M4	Tahoe	0
M1	Kansas City	4
Mountain Division
M2	Allen	0
M2	Allen	4
M3	Idaho	1

Conference Final
N1	Wheeling	1
S1	Florida	4
C1	Fort Wayne	2
M1	Kansas City	4

Kelly Cup Finals
S1	Florida	4
M1	Kansas City	2

== Division semifinals ==
Note: All times listed are in EDT (UTC−4).

=== North Division ===
==== (1) Wheeling Nailers vs. (4) Reading Royals ====
April 24	Reading Royals	0–4	Wheeling Nailers	WesBanco Arena	Recap
No scoring		First period	No scoring
No scoring		Second period	0:23 – pp – Zach Urdahl (1); 4:14 – sh – Zach Urdahl (2)
No scoring		Third period	9:14 – Max Graham (1); 15:49 – en – Matthew Quercia (1)
Yaniv Perets 23 saves / 26 shots		Goalie stats	Taylor Gauthier 20 saves / 20 shots

April 25	Reading Royals	1–5	Wheeling Nailers	WesBanco Arena	Recap
No scoring		First period	4:21 – Matthew Quercia (2)
Alec Butcher (1) – pp – 14:06		Second period	5:04 – Ryan McAllister (1); 12:17 – Matty De St. Phalle (1)
No scoring		Third period	12:44 – Blake Bennett (1); 16:50 – en – Craig Armstrong (1)
Keith Petruzzelli 14 saves / 18 shots		Goalie stats	Taylor Gauthier 32 saves / 33 shots

April 29	Wheeling Nailers	2–0	Reading Royals	Santander Arena	Recap
Ryan McAllister (2) – 17:27		First period	No scoring
Blake Bennett (2) – 8:56		Second period	No scoring
No scoring		Third period	No scoring
Taylor Gauthier 27 saves / 27 shots		Goalie stats	Yaniv Perets 24 saves / 26 shots

May 1	Wheeling Nailers	2–3	OT	Reading Royals	Santander Arena	Recap
Mike Posma (1) – 11:04		First period		15:23 – Connor Kurth (1)
Nolan Renwick (1) – 5:11		Second period		No scoring
No scoring		Third period		19:33 – Carson Golder (1)
No scoring		First overtime period		8:44 – Connor Kurth (2)
Taylor Gauthier 28 saves / 31 shots		Goalie stats		Yaniv Perets 25 saves / 27 shots

May 2	Wheeling Nailers	1–0	2OT	Reading Royals	Santander Arena	Recap
No scoring		First period		No scoring
No scoring		Second period		No scoring
No scoring		Third period		No scoring
Nolan Renwick (2) – 7:53		Second overtime period		No scoring
Taylor Gauthier 41 saves / 41 shots		Goalie stats		Yaniv Perets 54 saves / 55 shots

Wheeling won series 4–1

==== (2) Maine Mariners vs. (3) Adirondack Thunder ====
April 24	Adirondack Thunder	1–2	OT	Maine Mariners	Cross Insurance Arena	Recap
0		First period		0
0		Second period		0
1 Jackson van de Leest (1)		Third period		1 Robert Cronin (1)
0		First overtime period		1 Max Andreev SH (1)
Jeremy Brodeur 49 saves / 51 shots		Goalie stats		Luke Cavallin 15 saves / 16 shots

April 25	Adirondack Thunder	3–2	Maine Mariners	Cross Insurance Arena	Recap
2 Justin Taylor (both) (1) (2)		First period	1 Jacob Hudson (1)
0		Second period	0
1 Matt Salhany (1)		Third period	1 Antonio Venuto (1)
Jeremy Brodeur 26 saves / 28 shots		Goalie stats	Luke Cavallin 32 saves / 34 shots

April 29	Maine Mariners	5–2	Adirondack Thunder	Harding Mazzotti Arena	Recap
2 Antonio Venuto (2); Ty Cheveldayoff (1)		First period	0
1 Loke Johansson (1)		Second period	1 Tanner Edwards (1)
2 Shawn Element (1); Max Andreev (2)		Third period	1 Tag Bertuzzi (1)
Brad Arvanitis 16 saves / 18 shots		Goalie stats	Jeremy Brodeur 36 saves / 40 shots

May 1	Maine Mariners	5–4	Adirondack Thunder	Harding Mazzotti Arena	Recap
2 Shawn Element (2); Jacob Hudson (2)		First period	3 Grant Loven (1); Matt Salhany (2); Ryan Wheeler (1)
1 Shawn Element (3)		Second period	1 Adrien Beraldo (1)
2 Wyllum Deveaux (1); Jacob Perreault (1)		Third period	0
Brad Arvanitis 28 saves / 32 shots		Goalie stats	Jeremy Broduer 24 saves / 29 shots

May 2	Maine Mariners	2–3	OT	Adirondack Thunder	Harding Mazzotti Arena	Recap
1 Jacob Hudson (3)		First period		1 Matt Salhany (3)
1 Jacob Hudson (4)		Second period		1 Justin Taylor (3)
0		Third period		0
0		First overtime period		1 Justin Taylor (4)
Brad Arvanitis 25 saves / 28 shots		Goalie stats		Jeremy Brodeur 30 saves / 32 shots

May 5	Adirondack Thunder	2–1	OT	Maine Mariners	Cross Insurance Arena	Recap
0		First period		0
0		Second period		1 Jacob Hudson (4)
1 Tag Bertuzzi (2)		Third period		0
1 Jeremy Hanzel (1)		First overtime period		0
Jeremy Brodeur 28 saves / 29 shots		Goalie stats		Luke Cavallin 23 saves / 25 shots

May 6	Adirondack Thunder	1–3	Maine Mariners	Cross Insurance Arena	Recap
1 Tag Bertuzzi (3)		First period	0
0		Second period	1 Wyllum Deveaux (2)
0		Third period	2 Nick Anderson (1); Shawn Element (4)
Jeremy Brodeur 33 saves / 25 shots		Goalie stats	Luke Cavallin 20 saves / 21 shots

Maine won series 4–3

=== South Division ===
==== (1) Florida Everblades vs. (4) Savannah Ghost Pirates ====
April 24	Savannah Ghost Pirates	0–2	Florida Everblades	Hertz Arena	Recap
No scoring		First period	7:18 – Tarun Fizer (1)
No scoring		Second period	No scoring
No scoring		Third period	13:43 – Oliver Cooper (1)
Vinnie Purpura 29 saves / 31 shots		Goalie stats	Cam Johnson 29 saves / 29 shots

April 25	Savannah Ghost Pirates	1–4	Florida Everblades	Hertz Arena	Recap
Matt Koopman (1) – 19:46		First period	3:27 – Kyle Betts (1)
No scoring		Second period	6:44 – Jesse Lansdell (1); 12:52 – pp – Carson Gicewicz (1)
No scoring		Third period	18:25 – en – Anthony Romano (1)
Vinnie Purpura 39 saves / 42 shots		Goalie stats	Cam Johnson 25 saves / 26 shots

April 29	Florida Everblades	3–1	Savannah Ghost Pirates	Enmarket Arena	Recap
No scoring		First period	No scoring
Tarun Fizer (2) – 2:14; Carson Gicewicz (2) – 14:03		Second period	9:57 – Noah Carroll (1)
Carson Gicewicz (3) – en – 18:52		Third period	No scoring
Cam Johnson 18 saves / 19 shots		Goalie stats	Vinnie Purpura 29 saves / 31 shots

May 1	Florida Everblades	5–2	Savannah Ghost Pirates	Enmarket Arena	Recap
No scoring		First period	No scoring
Tarun Fizer (3) – 10:20; Carson Gicewicz (4) – sh – 17:39		Second period	No scoring
Jordan Sambrook (1) – pp – 1:57; Cole Moberg (1) – 9:02; Zach Berzolla (1) – en – 18:28		Third period	15:00 – Matt Koopman (2); 15:39 – Phip Waugh (1)
Cam Johnson 33 saves / 35 shots		Goalie stats	Vinnie Purpura 34 saves / 38 shots

Florida won series 4–0

==== (2) South Carolina Stingrays vs. (3) Atlanta Gladiators ====
April 24	Atlanta Gladiators	2–3	South Carolina Stingrays	North Charleston Coliseum	Recap
1		First period	0
0		Second period	1
1		Third period	2
Ethan Haider 27 saves / 30 shots		Goalie stats	Garin Bjorklund 39 saves / 41 shots

April 25	Atlanta Gladiators	4–3	South Carolina Stingrays	North Charleston Coliseum	Recap
1		First period	0
3		Second period	1
0		Third period	2
T.J. Semptimphelter 22 saves / 25 shots		Goalie stats	Garin Bjorklund 13 saves / 17 shots

April 27	South Carolina Stingrays	4–0	Atlanta Gladiators	Gas South Arena	Recap
1		First period	0
2		Second period	0
1		Third period	0
Ethan Haider 20 saves / 24 shots		Goalie stats	Garin Bjorklund 30 saves / 30 shots

April 28	South Carolina Stingrays	4–3	Atlanta Gladiators	Gas South Arena	Recap
1		First period	1
1		Second period	0
2		Third period	2
Garin Bjorklund 29 saves / 32 shots		Goalie stats	T.J.Semptimphelter 23 saves / 27 shots

May 1	Atlanta Gladiators	3–2	2OT	South Carolina Stingrays	North Charleston Coliseum	Recap

May 4	South Carolina Stingrays	3–1	Atlanta Gladiators	Gas South Arena	Recap

South Carolina won series 4–2

=== Central Division ===
==== (1) Fort Wayne Komets vs. (4) Indy Fuel ====
April 24	Indy Fuel	0–3	Fort Wayne Komets	Allen County War Memorial Coliseum	Recap
0		First period	1
0		Second period	0
0		Third period	2
Mitchell Weeks 26 saves / 29 shots		Goalie stats	Nathaniel Day 30 saves / 30 shots

April 25	Indy Fuel	1–5	Fort Wayne Komets	Allen County War Memorial Coliseum	Recap
1		First period	0
0		Second period	3
0		Third period	2
Mitchell Weeks 34 saves / 39 shots		Goalie stats	Nathaniel Day 34 saves / 35 shots

April 28	Fort Wayne Komets	4–6	Indy Fuel	Fishers Event Center	Recap
1		First period	3
1		Second period	2
2		Third period	1
Nathaniel Day 23 saves / 29 shots		Goalie stats	Owen Flores 22 saves / 26 shots

April 29	Fort Wayne Komets	3–2	Indy Fuel	Fishers Event Center	Recap
1		First period	0
1		Second period	1
1		Third period	1
Samuel Jonsson 20 saves / 22 shots		Goalie stats	Owen Flores 27 saves / 30 shots

May 3	Indy Fuel	0–4	Fort Wayne Komets	Allen County War Memorial Coliseum	Recap

Fort Wayne won series 4–1

==== (2) Toledo Walleye vs. (3) Bloomington Bison ====
April 23	Bloomington Bison	1–4	Toledo Walleye	Huntington Center	Recap
0		First period	1
1		Second period	0
0		Third period	3
Dryden McKay 26 saves / 29 shots		Goalie stats	Carter Gylander 15 saves / 16 shots

April 25	Bloomington Bison	3–4	Toledo Walleye	Huntington Center	Recap
1		First period	2
0		Second period	1
2		Third period	1
Dryden McKay 36 saves / 40 shots		Goalie stats	Carter Gylander 26 saves / 29 shots

April 27	Toledo Walleye	6–3	Bloomington Bison	Grossinger Motors Arena	Recap
4		First period	2
0		Second period	0
2		Third period	1
Carter Gylander 23 saves / 26 shots		Goalie stats	Callum Tung 26 saves / 28 shots ; Dryden McKay 9 saves / 12 shots

April 29	Toledo Walleye	3–5	Bloomington Bison	Grossinger Motors Arena	Recap
2		First period	1
1		Second period	2
0		Third period	2
Carter Gylander 25 saves / 29 shots		Goalie stats	Callum Tung 9 saves / 12 shots ; Dryden McKay 16 saves / 16 shots

April 30	Toledo Walleye	1–2	Bloomington Bison	Grossinger Motors Arena	Recap

May 3	Bloomington Bison	2–6	Toledo Walleye	Huntington Center	Recap

Toledo won series 4–2

=== Mountain Division ===
==== (1) Kansas City Mavericks vs. (4) Tahoe Knight Monsters ====
April 24	Tahoe Knight Monsters	1–4	Kansas City Mavericks	Cable Dahmer Arena	Recap
No scoring		First period	No scoring
No scoring		Second period	4:28 – pp – Jackson Jutting (1); 9:22 – Bobo Carpenter (1); 16:48 – Jackson Berezowski (1)
Sloan Stanick (1) – 5:46		Third period	13:12 – pp – Lucas Sowder (1)
Alex Tracy 31 saves / 35 shots		Goalie stats	Jack LaFontaine 15 saves / 16 shots

April 25	Tahoe Knight Monsters	1–2	OT	Kansas City Mavericks	Cable Dahmer Arena	Recap
Sloan Stanick (2) – pp – 7:46		First period		No scoring
No scoring		Second period		7:56 – Lucas Sowder (2)
No scoring		Third period		No scoring
No scoring		First overtime period		13:49 – Lucas Sowder (3)
Jordan Papirny 37 saves / 39 shots		Goalie stats		Dylan Wells 29 saves / 30 shots

April 29	Kansas City Mavericks	7–2	Tahoe Knight Monsters	Tahoe Blue Event Center	Recap
Jake McLaughlin (1) – 9:02		First period	No scoring
Bobo Carpenter (2) – 15:51; Nolan Sullivan (1) – 18:06		Second period	No scoring
Jimmy Glynn (1) – 1:20; Jack Randl (1) – 10:21; Jake McLaughlin (2) – 15:06; Bobo Carpenter (3) – pp – 15:32		Third period	8:13 – pp – Luke Adam (1); 9:19 – Jake Durflinger (2)
Jack LaFontaine 20 saves / 22 shots		Goalie stats	Jordan Papirny 15 saves / 22 shots

April 30	Kansas City Mavericks	4–1	Tahoe Knight Monsters	Tahoe Blue Event Center	Recap
Colby MacArthur (1) – 2:32; Jackson Berezowski (2) – pp – 10:36; Casey Carreau (1) – 15:30		First period	No scoring
No scoring		Second period	19:35 – pp – Casey Bailey (1)
Bobo Carpenter (3) – en – 17:26		Third period	No scoring
Dylan Wells 22 saves / 23 shots		Goalie stats	Alex Tracy 9 saves / 12 shots Jordan Papirny 10 saves / 10 shots

Kansas City won series 4–0

==== (2) Allen Americans vs. (3) Idaho Steelheads ====
April 23	Idaho Steelheads	1–5	Allen Americans	Credit Union of Texas Event Center	Recap
No scoring		First period	0:32 – Brayden Watts (1); 16:31 – Danny Katic (1)
Jade Miller (1) – 12:35		Second period	2:14 – Colton Hargrove (1)
No scoring		Third period	16:20 – en – Colby McAuley (1); 19:00 – en – Brayden Watts (2)
Jake Barczewski 22 saves / 25 shots		Goalie stats	Brett Mirwald 25 saves / 26 shots

April 24	Idaho Steelheads	2–4	Allen Americans	Credit Union of Texas Event Center	Recap
No scoring		First period	No scoring
No scoring		Second period	2:50 – pp – Andre Anania (1); 9:56 – Landen Hookey (1)
Nick Portz (1) – 10:21; Ty Pelton-Byce (1) – pp – 12:06		Third period	0:51 – pp – Colton Hargrove (2); 19:42 – sh-en – Sam Sedley (1)
Jake Barczewski 34 saves / 37 shots		Goalie stats	Brett Mirwald 26 saves / 28 shots

April 26	Allen Americans	4–3	OT	Idaho Steelheads	Idaho Central Arena	Recap
No scoring		First period		8:52 – Jade Miller (2); 10:22 – Nick Canade (1); 16:16 – pp – Ty Pelton-Byce (2)
Danny Katic (2) – pp – 11:41; Djibril Touré (1) – 12:40		Second period		No scoring
Brayden Watts (3) – 2:25		Third period		No scoring
Colby McAuley (2) – 4:06		First overtime period		No scoring
Brett Mirwald 10 saves / 13 shots Jackson Parsons 25 saves / 25 shots		Goalie stats		Jake Barczewski 18 saves / 22 shots

April 27	Allen Americans	1–5	Idaho Steelheads	Idaho Central Arena	Recap
No scoring		First period	5:16 – Kaleb Pearson (1); 7:45 – Brendan Hoffmann (1)
No scoring		Second period	2:06 – pp – Jack Adams (1); 7:46 – Brendan Hoffmann (2)
Colton Hargrove (3) – pp – 11:31		Third period	17:59 – pp – Ty Pelton-Byce (3)
Brett Mirwald 11 saves / 15 shots Marco Costantini 15 saves / 16 shots		Goalie stats	Jake Barczewski 39 saves / 40 shots

April 28	Allen Americans	6–3	Idaho Steelheads	Idaho Central Arena	Recap
Danny Katic (3) – pp – 18:20		First period	8:38 – Kaleb Pearson (2)
Brayden Watts (4) – 7:05; Spencer Asuchak (1) – 19:53		Second period	0:44 – Jade Miller (3); 13:02 – pp – Ty Pelton-Byce (4)
Mark Duarte (1) – 8:20; Danny Katic (4) – pp – 14:38; Danny Katic (5) – en – 15:54		Third period	No scoring
Marco Costantini 27 saves / 30 shots		Goalie stats	Jake Barczewski 27 saves / 32 shots

Allen won series 4–1

== Division finals ==
=== North Division ===
==== (1) Wheeling Nailers vs. (2) Maine Mariners ====
May 8	Maine Mariners	3–4	OT	Wheeling Nailers	WesBanco Arena	Recap
Antonio Venuto (3) – 7:40		First period		15:26 – Tristan Thompson (1)
Owen Gallatin (1) – pp – 0:37; Brooklyn Kalmikov (1) – 15:14		Second period		3:35 – Blake Bennett (3); 16:01 – Mike Posma (2)
No scoring		Third period		No scoring
No scoring		First overtime period		3:10 – Ryan McAllister (3)
Brad Arvanitis 38 saves / 42 shots		Goalie stats		Taylor Gauthier 27 saves / 30 shots

May 9	Maine Mariners	1–4	Wheeling Nailers	WesBanco Arena	Recap
Zach Jordan (1) – 18:46		First period	0:45 – Matthew Quercia (3); 19:51 – Brayden Edwards (1)
No scoring		Second period	5:54 – Zach Urdahl (3); 12:34 – Logan Pietila (1)
No scoring		Third period	No scoring
Luke Cavallin 19 saves / 23 shots		Goalie stats	Taylor Gauthier 32 saves / 33 shots

May 11	Wheeling Nailers	3–6	Maine Mariners	Cross Insurance Arena	Recap
No scoring		First period	6:58 – pp – Robert Cronin (2); 9:40 – Zachary Massicotte (1); 12:55 – Ben Allison (1)
Logan Pietila (2) – 15:13		Second period	4:39 – pp – Brooklyn Kalmikov (2); 9:54 – pp – Antonio Venuto (4)
Zach Urdahl (4) – sh – 13:03; Blake Bennett (4) – pp – 16:31		Third period	7:05 – pp – Max Andreev (3)
Taylor Gauthier 13 saves / 18 shots Gabriel D'Aigle 11 saves / 12 shots		Goalie stats	Luke Cavallin 36 saves / 39 shots

May 12	Wheeling Nailers	1–2	2OT	Maine Mariners	Cross Insurance Arena	Recap
Brayden Edwards (2) – pp – 17:01		First period		4:56 – Max Andreev (4)
No scoring		Second period		No scoring
No scoring		Third period		No scoring
No scoring		Second overtime period		8:06 – Jacob Hudson (6)
Taylor Gauthier 33 saves / 35 shots		Goalie stats		Luke Cavallin 35 saves / 36 shots

May 13	Wheeling Nailers	3–5	Maine Mariners	Cross Insurance Arena	Recap
Ryan McAllister (4) – 4:51		First period	12:51 – Ben Allison (2); 13:32 – Max Andreev (5)
No scoring		Second period	5:08 – pp – Max Andreev (6)
Brayden Edwards (3) – pp – 9:03; Matty De St. Phalle (2) – 17:56		Third period	4:14 – Brooklyn Kalmikov (3); 12:15 – Brooklyn Kalmikov (4)
Taylor Gauthier 31 saves / 36 shots		Goalie stats	Luke Cavallin 20 saves / 23 shots

May 16	Maine Mariners	1–2	OT	Wheeling Nailers	WesBanco Arena	Recap
No scoring		First period		No scoring
No scoring		Second period		5:31 – Nolan Renwick (3)
Michael Underwood (1) – 8:15		Third period		No scoring
No scoring		First overtime period		17:00 – pp – Emil Pieniniemi (1)
Luke Cavallin 46 saves / 48 shots		Goalie stats		Taylor Gauthier 31 saves / 32 shots

May 18	Maine Mariners	3–4	Wheeling Nailers	WesBanco Arena	Recap
No scoring		First period	7:08 – Matthew Quercia (4); 13:58 – Tanner Andrew (1)
Owen Gallatin (2) – 8:14		Second period	No scoring
Wyllum Deveaux (3) – 18:51; Robert Cronin (3) – 19:33		Third period	16:53 – Mathieu De St. Phalle (3); 18:29 – en – Zach Urdahl (5)
Luke Cavallin 21 saves / 24 shots		Goalie stats	Taylor Gauthier 27 saves / 30 shots

Wheeling won series 4–3

=== South Division ===
==== (1) Florida Everblades vs. (2) South Carolina Stingrays ====
May 8	South Carolina Stingrays	0–3	Florida Everblades	Hertz Arena	Recap
No scoring		First period	4:09 – Anthony Romano (2)
No scoring		Second period	3:33 – pp – Hudson Elynuik (1)
No scoring		Third period	11:50 – Anthony Romano (3)
Garin Bjorklund 39 saves / 42 shots		Goalie stats	Cam Johnson 22 saves / 22 shots

May 9	South Carolina Stingrays	2–6	Florida Everblades	Hertz Arena	Recap

May 13	Florida Everblades	7–3	South Carolina Stingrays	North Charleston Coliseum	Recap

May 15	Florida Everblades	1–3	South Carolina Stingrays	North Charleston Coliseum	Recap

May 17	Florida Everblades	3–1	South Carolina Stingrays	North Charleston Coliseum	Recap

Florida won series 4–1

=== Central Division ===
==== (1) Fort Wayne Komets vs. (2) Toledo Walleye ====
May 10	Toledo Walleye	1–4	Fort Wayne Komets	Allen County War Memorial Coliseum	Recap

May 12	Fort Wayne Komets	3–0	Toledo Walleye	Huntington Center	Recap

May 14	Toledo Walleye	2–4	Fort Wayne Komets	Allen County War Memorial Coliseum	Recap

May 15	Fort Wayne Komets	2–3	OT	Toledo Walleye	Huntington Center	Recap

May 16	Fort Wayne Komets	1–4	Toledo Walleye	Huntington Center	Recap

May 19	Toledo Walleye	3–5	Fort Wayne Komets	Allen County War Memorial Coliseum	Recap

Fort Wayne won series 4–2

=== Mountain Division ===
==== (1) Kansas City Mavericks vs. (2) Allen Americans ====
May 9	Allen Americans	1–2	Kansas City Mavericks	Cable Dahmer Arena	Recap

May 10	Allen Americans	0–1	Kansas City Mavericks	Cable Dahmer Arena	Recap

May 13	Kansas City Mavericks	7–4	Allen Americans	Credit Union of Texas Event Center	Recap

May 16	Kansas City Mavericks	5–3	Allen Americans	Credit Union of Texas Event Center	Recap

Kansas City won series 4–0

== Conference finals ==
=== Eastern Conference ===
==== (S1) Florida Everblades vs. (N1) Wheeling Nailers ====
May 22	Wheeling Nailers	1–2	Florida Everblades	Hertz Arena	Recap
0		First period	0
0		Second period	2
0		Third period	0

May 23	Wheeling Nailers	0–1	Florida Everblades	Hertz Arena	Recap

May 27	Florida Everblades	5–2	Wheeling Nailers	WesBanco Arena	Recap

May 29	Florida Everblades	2–3	OT	Wheeling Nailers	WesBanco Arena	Recap

May 30	Florida Everblades	6–1	Wheeling Nailers	WesBanco Arena	Recap

Florida won series 4–1

=== Western Conference ===
==== (M1) Kansas City Mavericks vs. (C1) Fort Wayne Komets ====
May 22	Fort Wayne Komets	1–5	Kansas City Mavericks	Cable Dahmer Arena	Recap
0		First period	0
1		Second period	2
0		Third period	1

May 23	Fort Wayne Komets	4–3	Kansas City Mavericks	Cable Dahmer Arena	Recap

May 25	Kansas City Mavericks	6–4	Fort Wayne Komets	Allen County War Memorial Coliseum	Recap

May 26	Kansas City Mavericks	4–2	Fort Wayne Komets	Allen County War Memorial Coliseum	Recap

May 31	Kansas City Mavericks	1–4	Fort Wayne Komets	Allen County War Memorial Coliseum	Recap

June 2	Fort Wayne Komets	3–4	OT	Kansas City Mavericks	Cable Dahmer Arena	Recap

Kansas City won series 4–2

== Kelly Cup finals ==
=== (M1) Kansas City Mavericks vs. (S1) Florida Everblades ===
June 5	Florida Everblades	0–6	Kansas City Mavericks	Cable Dahmer Arena	Recap
0		First period	0
1		Second period	2
0		Third period	1

June 6	Florida Everblades	2–5	Kansas City Mavericks	Cable Dahmer Arena	Recap

June 10	Kansas City Mavericks	1–2	OT	Florida Everblades	Hertz Arena	Recap

June 12	Kansas City Mavericks	2–3	OT	Florida Everblades	Hertz Arena	Recap

June 13	Kansas City Mavericks	2–5	Florida Everblades	Hertz Arena	Recap

June 15	Florida Everblades	5–4	2OT	Kansas City Mavericks	Cable Dahmer Arena	Recap

Florida won series 4–2
