= Casey Bailey =

American ice hockey player (born 1991)

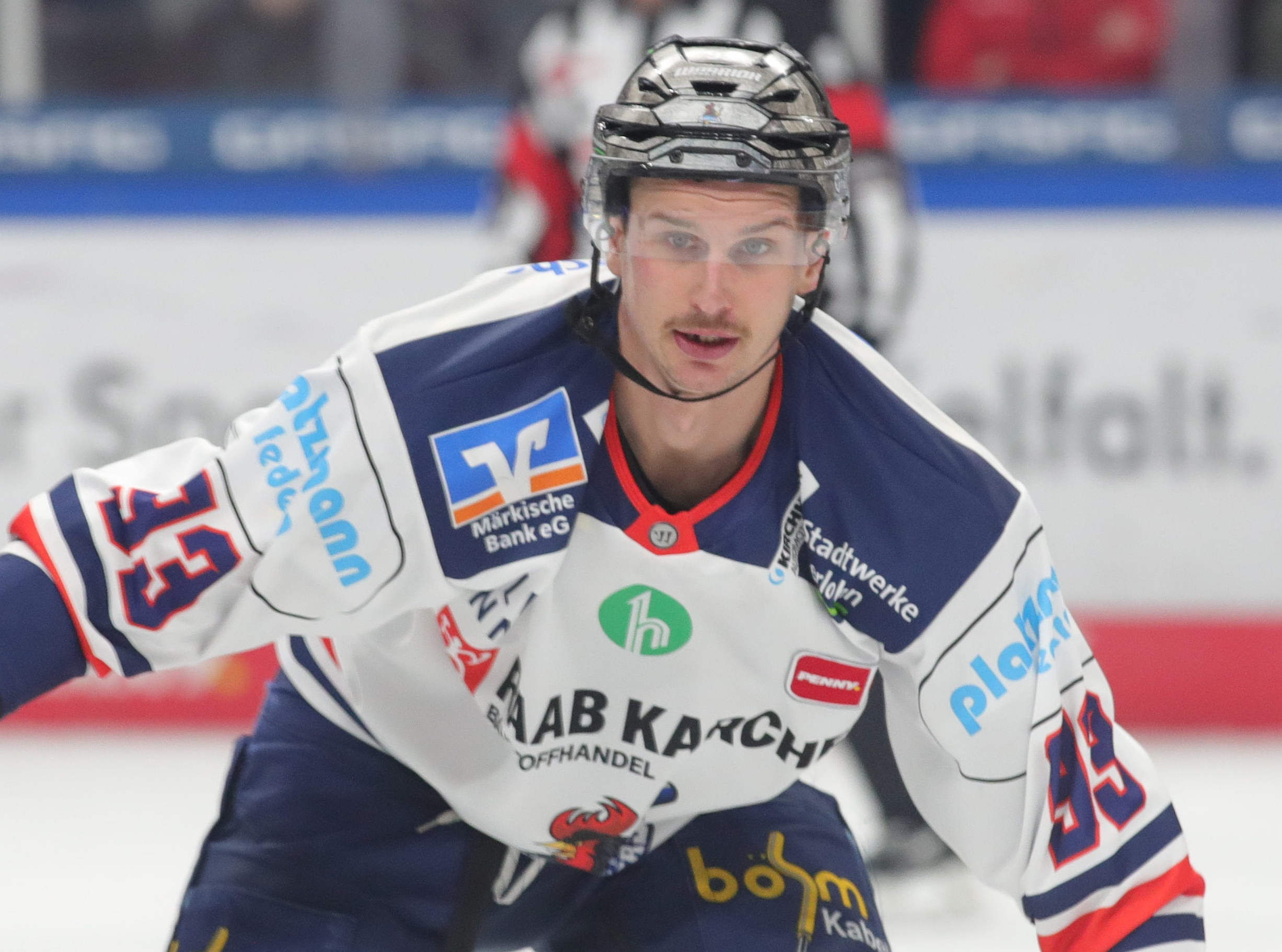
- Casey Bailey, 2022
- Born: October 27, 1991 (age 34) Anchorage, Alaska, U.S.
- Height: 6 ft 3 in (191 cm)
- Weight: 205 lb (93 kg; 14 st 9 lb)
- Position: Right wing
- Shoots: Right
- ECHL team Former teams: Tahoe Knight Monsters; Toronto Maple Leafs; Ottawa Senators; HC Slovan Bratislava; Växjö Lakers; Iserlohn Roosters; ERC Ingolstadt; Graz 99ers
- NHL draft: Undrafted
- Playing career: 2015–present

Casey Bailey (born October 27, 1991) is an American professional ice hockey player for the Tahoe Knight Monsters. Bailey played college hockey with the Penn State Nittany Lions and is the first Penn State player to play in the NHL. Bailey played 13 games in the NHL for the Toronto Maple Leafs, whom he signed with out of college, and the Ottawa Senators.

== Playing career ==
As a youth, Bailey played in the 2004 Quebec International Pee-Wee Hockey Tournament with a minor ice hockey team from Alaska. Bailey played junior A hockey for the Alberni Valley Bulldogs of the British Columbia Hockey League from 2009 to 2012 before going to play college hockey with the Penn State Nittany Lions. In the 2014–15 junior season, he finished fourth in scoring within the Big Ten Conference. He finished his Penn State career with 45 goals and 80 points in 96 games.

Having not been selected in any NHL entry drafts, Bailey signed a two-year, entry-level contract with the Toronto Maple Leafs on March 21, 2015. He became the first Penn State player to sign an NHL contract, as well as the first to play in the NHL. Fourteen other NHL teams had shown interest in Bailey and Bailey had previously attended training camps with the Boston Bruins and Calgary Flames. Before signing, Bailey was negotiating an entry-level deal with the Buffalo Sabres, however, the Sabres were unwilling to meet Bailey's demands of playing in the final few games of the team's season, prompting the signing with Toronto.

Bailey played in his first NHL game on March 26, 2015, versus the Florida Panthers and was on the ice for the Maple Leafs lone goal in a 4–1 loss. Bailey scored his first NHL goal in the last game of his inaugural season, on April 11, 2015, against Carey Price of the Montreal Canadiens. During his first full professional season in 2015–16, Bailey was assigned to the Leafs' American Hockey League (AHL) affiliate, the Toronto Marlies, and produced 18 points in 38 contests before he was included alongside Dion Phaneuf in a nine-player trade to the Ottawa Senators organization on February 9, 2016. Bailey finished the season with the Senators' AHL affiliate Binghamton Senators collecting 7 goals and 21 points in 30 games.

On July 1, 2016, Bailey signed a one-year two-way contract with the Ottawa Senators. He was invited to training camp but Bailey was assigned to Binghamton to start the 2016–17 season. He was called up to Ottawa in December after Mike Hoffman was suspended and made his Ottawa debut on December 17 against the New Jersey Devils. He was sent back down but recalled again in January when Ottawa was dealing with a flu problem amongst the regulars. He finished the season with Binghamton, marking 21 goals and 37 points in 62 games and played in 7 games for Ottawa, going scoreless. He was Binghamton's only representative at the 2017 AHL All-Star Classic.

As a free agent from the Senators in the off-season, Bailey accepted an invitation to attend the New York Islanders 2017 training camp on September 12, 2017. Following the conclusion of the camp with the Islanders, Bailey was not offered a contract but was reassigned to try-out with their AHL affiliate, the Bridgeport Sound Tigers on September 24, 2017. After impressing in camp, Bailey was signed to a one-year AHL contract with the Sound Tigers on October 2, 2017. He finished the season with 18 goals and 41 points with Bridgeport.

Unable to attract significant high-level North American interest, Bailey opted to take his career overseas, signing with HC Slovan Bratislava of the Kontinental Hockey League (KHL) on September 21, 2018. In Slovan's last year in the KHL in 2018–19 season, Bailey was used in a bottom-six checking role, contributing with just 1 goal and 5 points through 45 games.

Returning to North America as a free agent, Bailey was signed to a professional try-out (PTO) agreement with the Hershey Bears of the AHL on July 30, 2019. After attending the Bears training camp, he was released from his tryout before the 2019–20 season. He then signed an ECHL contract with the Hershey Bears's affiliate, the South Carolina Stingrays. Bailey added 11 points in just 9 games with the Stingrays before he was loaned to the Charlotte Checkers of the AHL on a PTO on November 12, 2019. Bailey contributed with 1 goal and 3 points in 5 games with the Checkers before he was released from his tryout on November 25, 2019.

Having earlier secured a contract in Europe for the remainder of the 2019–20 season, Bailey was introduced on the same day on his release from the AHL by Swedish club Växjö Lakers of the Swedish Hockey League (SHL). Bailey made 28 appearances with Växjö, contributing offensively with 7 goals and 11 points, before the playoffs were abandoned due to the COVID-19 pandemic.

On September 4, 2020, now a free agent from Växjö, Bailey remained in Europe, signing a one-year contract for the 2020–21 season with German club Iserlohn Roosters of the Deutsche Eishockey Liga (DEL).

Following three seasons with Iserlohn, Bailey left the club after his contract and signed a one-year deal to continue in the DEL with ERC Ingolstadt on May 22, 2023.

== Personal life ==
Bailey was born in Anchorage, Alaska, to parents Glen and Dawn Bailey. He has one brother, Kyle, and a sister, Jessica (Graham). At the time of his signing in Toronto, Bailey was working on earning a university degree in economics.

== Career statistics ==
			Regular season					Playoffs
Season	Team	League	GP	G	A	Pts	PIM	GP	G	A	Pts	PIM
2007–08	West Anchorage High	USHS-AK	22	19	16	35	66	1	0	0	0	2
2008–09	West Anchorage High	USHS-AK	25	29	28	57	30	—	—	—	—	—
2008–09	Anchorage North Stars	18U AAA	16	15	6	21	50	4	2	2	4	8
2009–10	Alberni Valley Bulldogs	BCHL	51	13	11	24	43	13	0	2	2	2
2010–11	Alberni Valley Bulldogs	BCHL	60	28	30	58	74	4	4	3	7	4
2011–12	Omaha Lancers	USHL	60	27	32	59	83	4	2	2	4	6
2012–13	Penn State	NCAA	27	14	13	27	34	—	—	—	—	—
2013–14	Penn State	NCAA	32	9	4	13	20	—	—	—	—	—
2014–15	Penn State	NCAA	37	22	18	40	37	—	—	—	—	—
2014–15	Toronto Maple Leafs	NHL	6	1	0	1	2	—	—	—	—	—
2015–16	Toronto Marlies	AHL	38	4	14	18	16	—	—	—	—	—
2015–16	Binghamton Senators	AHL	30	7	14	21	10	—	—	—	—	—
2016–17	Ottawa Senators	NHL	7	0	0	0	0	—	—	—	—	—
2016–17	Binghamton Senators	AHL	62	21	16	37	20	—	—	—	—	—
2017–18	Bridgeport Sound Tigers	AHL	76	18	23	41	25	—	—	—	—	—
2018–19	HC Slovan Bratislava	KHL	45	1	4	5	26	—	—	—	—	—
2019–20	South Carolina Stingrays	ECHL	9	8	3	11	10	—	—	—	—	—
2019–20	Charlotte Checkers	AHL	5	1	2	3	0	—	—	—	—	—
2019–20	Växjö Lakers	SHL	28	7	4	11	30	—	—	—	—	—
2020–21	Iserlohn Roosters	DEL	37	20	24	44	56	3	2	1	3	4
2021–22	Iserlohn Roosters	DEL	50	23	18	41	28	—	—	—	—	—
2022–23	Iserlohn Roosters	DEL	53	12	27	39	41	—	—	—	—	—
2023–24	ERC Ingolstadt	DEL	20	4	6	10	12	7	2	1	3	6
2024–25	Graz 99ers	ICEHL	46	15	12	27	16	7	5	1	6	0
2025–26	Tahoe Knight Monsters	ECHL	54	25	29	54	46	4	1	1	2	16
NHL totals			13	1	0	1	2	—	—	—	—	—

== Awards and honors ==
Award	Year
College
Big Ten Conference First All-Star Team	2015
