= Maine Mariners =

Maine Mariners may refer to:

- Maine Mariners (AHL), an ice hockey team in Portland, Maine, which operated from 1977 to 1992
- Maine Mariners (ECHL), an ice hockey team in Portland, Maine, which has operated since 2018
