= 2025–26 ECHL season =

American ice hockey season

- League: ECHL
- Sport: Ice hockey
- Duration: October 17, 2025 – April 19, 2026

Regular season
- Brabham Cup: Kansas City Mavericks
- Season MVP: Marcus Crawford (Kansas City)
- Top scorer: Marcus Crawford (Kansas City)

Playoffs
- Eastern champions: Florida Everblades
- Eastern runners-up: Wheeling Nailers
- Western champions: Kansas City Mavericks
- Western runners-up: Fort Wayne Komets
- Playoffs MVP: Cam Johnson

Kelly Cup
- Champions: Florida Everblades
- Runners-up: Kansas City Mavericks

ECHL seasons
- ← 2024–25 2026–27 →

The 2025–26 ECHL season was the 38th season of the ECHL. The regular season began on October 17, 2025, and ended on April 19, 2026, with the 2026 Kelly Cup playoffs starting on April 23 and ending on June 15. Thirty teams affiliated with an NHL team in 22 states and one Canadian province are scheduled to play 72 regular season games.

The Trois-Rivières Lions entered the season as the Kelly Cup champions, while South Carolina entered as the defending Brabham Cup winners. The season was interrupted from December 26 to December 29, 2025, by a strike action taken by Professional Hockey Players' Association (PHPA), the union representing ECHL players. An agreement to end the strike was ratified by the PHPA on December 30. Forty-one games were postponed as a result of the strike.

On March 9, 2026, the ECHL Board of Governors approved the voluntary suspension of operations for the Iowa Heartlanders. They finished the remainder of the season.

On June 15, 2026, the Florida Everblades won their fifth Kelly Cup championship over the Kansas City Mavericks in six games.

== League changes ==
The league has one new team this season: the Greensboro Gargoyles.

=== Affiliation changes ===
ECHL team	New affiliates	Former affiliates
Allen Americans	Ottawa Senators (NHL); Belleville Senators (AHL)	Utah Mammoth (NHL); Tucson Roadrunners (AHL)

== Standings ==
As of April 19, 2026

=== Eastern Conference ===
x – clinched playoff spot, y – clinched regular season division title, z – Brabham Cup (regular season) champion
e – indicates team has been eliminated from playoff contention

North Division	GP	W	L	OTL	SOL	GF	GA	Pts	Pts%
y – Wheeling Nailers (PIT)	72	46	20	3	3	231	175	98	0.681
x – Maine Mariners (BOS)	72	42	21	6	3	223	177	93	0.646
x – Adirondack Thunder (NJD)	72	37	24	10	1	213	216	85	0.590
x – Reading Royals (PHI)	72	36	26	8	2	199	205	82	0.569
e – Trois-Rivières Lions (MTL)	72	35	30	3	4	207	203	77	0.535
e – Worcester Railers (NYI)	72	35	30	5	2	196	213	77	0.535
e – Norfolk Admirals (WPG)	72	30	38	4	0	211	250	64	0.444
e – Greensboro Gargoyles (CAR)	72	19	46	6	1	184	276	45	0.313

South Division	GP	W	L	OTL	SOL	GF	GA	Pts	Pts%
y – Florida Everblades (STL)	72	49	13	7	3	245	142	108	0.750
x – South Carolina Stingrays (WAS)	72	45	23	1	3	223	204	94	0.653
x – Atlanta Gladiators (NSH)	72	44	23	4	1	209	183	93	0.646
x – Savannah Ghost Pirates (FLA)	72	35	33	3	1	209	208	74	0.514
e – Jacksonville Icemen (BUF)	72	29	32	8	3	190	238	69	0.479
e – Greenville Swamp Rabbits (LAK)	72	27	35	7	3	191	224	64	0.444
e – Orlando Solar Bears (TBL)	72	29	38	4	1	186	230	63	0.438

=== Western Conference ===
Central Division	GP	W	L	OTL	SOL	GF	GA	Pts	Pts%
y – Fort Wayne Komets (EDM)	72	45	17	10	0	250	189	100	0.694
x – Toledo Walleye (DET)	72	43	17	7	5	253	198	98	0.681
x – Bloomington Bison (NYR)	72	37	30	2	3	224	219	79	0.549
x – Indy Fuel (CHI)	72	34	27	10	1	182	190	79	0.549
e – Kalamazoo Wings (VAN)	72	36	30	3	3	228	246	78	0.542
e – Cincinnati Cyclones (TOR)	72	35	32	4	1	217	248	75	0.521
e – Iowa Heartlanders (MIN)	72	24	40	5	3	188	252	56	0.389

Mountain Division	GP	W	L	OTL	SOL	GF	GA	Pts	Pts%
z – Kansas City Mavericks (SEA)	72	55	12	3	2	255	159	115	0.799
x – Allen Americans (OTT)	72	43	23	6	0	268	209	92	0.639
x – Idaho Steelheads (DAL)	72	42	23	6	1	251	219	91	0.632
x – Tahoe Knight Monsters (VGK)	72	35	30	4	3	257	260	77	0.535
e – Utah Grizzlies (COL)	72	30	32	9	1	237	255	70	0.486
e – Rapid City Rush (CGY)	72	29	36	6	1	223	261	65	0.451
e – Tulsa Oilers (ANA)	72	29	38	5	0	196	255	63	0.438
e – Wichita Thunder (SJS)	72	25	35	8	4	199	241	62	0.431

== Statistical leaders ==
=== Scoring leaders ===
The following players are sorted by points, then goals.

GP = Games played; G = Goals; A = Assists; Pts = Points; PIM = Penalty minutes

Player	Team	GP	G	A	Pts	PIM
Marcus Crawford	Kansas City Mavericks	70	14	72	86	125
Brandon Hawkins	Toledo Walleye	69	35	43	78	20
Brayden Watts	Allen Americans	71	24	51	75	12
Simon Pinard	South Carolina Stingrays	72	30	43	73	20
Danny Dzhaniyev	Utah Grizzlies	62	24	49	73	22
Danny Katic	Allen Americans	62	38	32	70	109
Kirill Tyutyayev	Fort Wayne Komets	70	22	46	68	28
Brannon McManus	Adirondack Thunder	72	31	36	67	40
Austin Magera	Fort Wayne Komets	71	32	33	65	20
Devon Paliani	Tahoe Knight Monsters	72	32	33	65	107
Peter Bates	Wichita Thunder	72	23	42	65	16

=== Leading goaltenders ===
GP = Games played; TOI = Time on ice (in minutes); SA = Shots against; GA = Goals against; SO = Shutouts; GAA = Goals against average; SV% = Save percentage; W = Wins; L = Losses; OTL = Overtime/shootout loss

Player	Team	GP	TOI	SA	GA	SO	GAA	SV%	W	L	OTL
Cam Johnson	Florida Everblades	49	2965	1175	91	3	1.84	.923	31	9	9
Jack LaFontaine	Kansas City Mavericks	29	1704	782	56	4	1.97	.928	22	2	4
Taylor Gauthier	Wheeling Nailers	36	2156	1062	75	3	2.09	.929	21	9	5
Brad Arvanitis	Maine Mariners	38	2211	1124	80	3	2.17	.929	22	11	4
Will Cranley	Florida Everblades	18	1080	460	39	2	2.17	.915	14	3	1

== Labor dispute ==
The 2025–26 ECHL began with an expired collective bargaining agreement between the Professional Hockey Players' Association and the ECHL. On December 19, 2025, the ECHL members of the PHPA voted to authorize a strike action. On December 22, the PHPA served notice to the ECHL that the players would strike beginning on December 26. A tentative agreement was reached to end the strike on December 27, which was subsequently ratified by the PHPA on December 30. Games resumed the same day, with the strike ultimately having postponed a total of 41 games between December 26 and December 29.

== Postseason ==
The top four teams in each division at the end of the regular season will advance to the 2026 Kelly Cup playoffs and be seeded one through four based on their end-of-season division ranking. Each round is a best-of-seven series with the winner advancing to the next round. The first two rounds are played between teams in the same division, with the first seed facing the fourth seed and the second seed facing the third seed. The winners of each division then play off to determine the winners of each conference. Nine of the 16 playoff teams are repeats from the previous season, including Toledo on a 10-season playoff streak.

=== Bracket ===
Division Semifinals	Division Finals
N1	Wheeling	4
N4	Reading	1
N1	Wheeling	4
North Division
N2	Maine	3
N2	Maine	4
N3	Adirondack	3
Eastern Conference
S1	Florida	4
S4	Savannah	0
S1	Florida	4
South Division
S2	South Carolina	1
S2	South Carolina	4
S3	Atlanta	2
C1	Fort Wayne	4
C4	Indy	1
C1	Fort Wayne	4
Central Division
C2	Toledo	2
C2	Toledo	4
C3	Bloomington	2
Western Conference
M1	Kansas City	4
M4	Tahoe	0
M1	Kansas City	4
Mountain Division
M2	Allen	0
M2	Allen	4
M3	Idaho	1

Conference Final
N1	Wheeling	1
S1	Florida	4
C1	Fort Wayne	2
M1	Kansas City	4

Kelly Cup Finals
S1	Florida	4
M1	Kansas City	2

== See also ==
- List of ECHL seasons
- 2025 in ice hockey
- 2026 in ice hockey
