= Wheeling Nailers =

ECHL ice hockey team

- City: Wheeling, West Virginia
- League: ECHL
- Conference: Western
- Division: Central
- Founded: 1981 (in the ACHL)
- Home arena: WesBanco Arena (4,890)
- Colors: Black, gold, white
- Owner: Hockey Club of the Ohio Valley
- Head coach: Nate DiCasmirro
- Media: Wheeling News Register; WKWK-FM 97.3; WTRF-TV channel 7 WTOV-TV channel 9
- Affiliates: Columbus Blue Jackets (NHL); Cleveland Monsters (AHL)
- Website: wheelingnailers.com

Franchise history
- 1981–1982: Winston-Salem Thunderbirds
- 1982–1989: Carolina Thunderbirds
- 1989–1992: Winston-Salem Thunderbirds
- 1992–1996: Wheeling Thunderbirds
- 1996–present: Wheeling Nailers

Championships
- Regular season titles: 2 (1992–93, 1994–95)
- Division titles: 4 (1992–93, 1994–95, 2003–04, 2025–26)
- Conference titles: 2 (1992–93, 2015–16)

The Wheeling Nailers are a professional ECHL ice hockey team based in Wheeling, West Virginia. On August 6, 2026 they announced their affiliation with the NHL's Columbus Blue Jackets and AHL's Cleveland Monsters.

The Nailers are the oldest surviving minor league franchise below the level of the American Hockey League, with unbroken continuity of franchise and never having missed a season of play.

== Franchise history ==
The Nailers began play in 1981 in the Atlantic Coast Hockey League as the Carolina Thunderbirds based in Winston-Salem, North Carolina. The Thunderbirds won four consecutive regular season titles and were three-time Bob Payne Trophy winners as league champions. In 1987, the ACHL folded and the team joined the All-American Hockey League for the 1987–88 season. The Thunderbirds, Virginia Lancers, and Johnstown Chiefs then became the basis for the East Coast Hockey League, now known as the ECHL. The Thunderbirds lost the first ECHL playoff championship final to the Toledo Storm. The team was renamed Winston-Salem Thunderbirds in 1990 and moved to Wheeling to become the Wheeling Thunderbirds in 1992 under the leadership of president and co-owner Ed Broyhill.

After a trademark dispute with the Seattle Thunderbirds of the Western Hockey League, the team was renamed Nailers for the 1996–97 season when the franchise held a contest open to local fans, which was won by C. J. Wickham of Steubenville, Ohio. The name "Nailers" was chosen for the city's long history of nail manufacturing. For the 2012–13 season, the Nailers dropped the red-black-gold scheme they had used for nearly two decades in favor of a black-and-gold palette used by the Penguins.

The team plays at the WesBanco Arena (formerly the Wheeling Civic Center), and used the Cambria County War Memorial Arena in Johnstown, Pennsylvania as an alternative venue during the 2010–2011 and 2011-2012 seasons. After missing the playoffs for five straight seasons, they had a 106-point season in 2003–04. They were defeated by the Reading Royals in five games, 3–2. In season 2005–06 they had a great season making it to the second round of the playoffs losing to Toledo in the final second of the final game.

In August 2011, the Nailers moved to the Eastern Conference's Atlantic Division as part of the league realignment for the 2011–12 season. The Chicago Express took the North Division spot vacated by the Nailers. In June 2014 the Nailers returned to the North Division after the ECHL eliminated the Atlantic Division in its realignment for the 2014–15 season.

On March 29, 2012, the ECHL announced that ownership of the Nailers would be transferred from the Brooks-owned Nailers Hockey LLC to the Hockey Club of the Ohio Valley, a joint venture of the Ohio Valley Industrial & Business Development Corporation, and the Wheeling Amateur Hockey Association, to take effect at the conclusion of the 2011–2012 season.

On June 23, 2026, the NHL Board of Governors approved the sale of the Pittsburgh Penguins to the Hoffmann Family of Companies, who already owned the Florida Everblades of the ECHL. This sparked speculation of a possible change in ECHL affiliate. On June 26, the Hoffmanns did an interview at PPG Paints Arena in which David Hoffmann was asked about affiliating Pittsburgh to the Everblades. He replied to this question with, "They would run me out of Naples if they're not." On July 16, General Manager Kyle Dubas announced that the Penguins would not be continuing their affiliation with the Nailers "because of very unique circumstances." On August 6, they announced that they had entered a 2-year affiliation agreement with the Columbus Blue Jackets and Cleveland Monsters, marking the first time in 29 years where Wheeling is not affiliated with Pittsburgh.

== Season-by-season results ==
Regular season											Playoffs					
Season	GP	W	L	T	OTL	SOL	Pts	GF	GA	Standing	Year	Prelim	1st round	2nd round	3rd round	Kelly Cup
Wheeling Thunderbirds
1992–93	64	40	16	—	8	—	88	314	223	1st, East	1993	—	BYE	W, 3–1, JHN	W, 4–2, RAL	L, 2–4, TOL
1993–94	68	38	23	—	7	—	83	327	289	3rd, North	1994	—	W, 2–0, NSH	W, 3–1, HR	L, 0–3, TOL	—
1994–95	68	46	17	—	5	—	97	313	243	1st, North	1995	—	L, 0–3, BIR	—	—	—
1995–96	70	42	23	—	—	5	89	289	261	2nd, North	1996	—	W, 3–0, CLB	L, 1–3, TAL	—	—
Wheeling Nailers
1996–97	70	36	29	5	—	—	77	298	291	4th, North	1997	—	L, 0–3, PEO	—	—	—
1997–98	70	37	24	9	—	—	83	255	255	2nd, North	1998	—	W, 3–2, DAY	W, 3–1, TOL	L, 2–4, HR	—
1998–99	70	27	37	6	—	—	60	206	249	6th, Northeast	1999	Did not qualify				
1999–2000	70	25	40	5	—	—	55	202	246	5th, Northeast	2000	Did not qualify				
2000–01	72	24	40	8	—	—	56	192	277	5th, Northeast	2001	Did not qualify				
2001–02	72	36	32	4	—	—	76	213	208	5th, Northeast	2002	Did not qualify				
2002–03	72	28	41	3	—	—	59	193	261	6th, Northeast	2003	Did not qualify				
2003–04	72	51	17	4	—	—	106	259	188	1st, North	2004	BYE	L, 2–3, REA	—	—	—
2004–05	72	38	29	5	—	—	81	171	173	6th, North	2005	Did not qualify				
2005–06	72	45	21	6	—	—	96	247	186	2nd, East	2006	BYE	W, 3–1, REA	L, 2–3, TOL	—	—
2006–07	72	32	34	—	2	4	70	215	255	7th, North	2007	Did not qualify				
2007–08	72	22	43	—	3	4	51	186	284	7th, North	2008	Did not qualify				
2008–09	72	36	28	—	2	6	80	263	260	4th, North	2009	—	L, 3–4, CIN	—	—	—
2009–10	72	33	32	—	2	5	73	240	249	4th, North	2010	Did not qualify				
2010–11	72	38	29	—	0	5	81	230	210	2nd, North	2011	—	W, 3–1, SC	W, 4–3, GRN	L, 2–4, KAL	—
2011–12	72	37	26	—	4	6	83	219	202	2nd, Atlantic	2012	—	L, 1–3, KAL	—	—	—
2012–13	72	31	29	—	3	9	74	193	225	3rd, Atlantic	2013	Did not qualify				
2013–14	72	39	27	—	1	5	84	216	196	2nd, Atlantic	2014	—	W, 4–0, SC	L, 2–4, GRN	—	—
2014–15	72	37	33	—	1	1	76	210	213	4th, North	2015	—	L, 3–4, TOL	—	—	—
2015–16	72	37	26	—	5	4	83	214	211	2nd, North	2016	—	W, 4–2, FLA	W, 4–3, REA	W, 4–3, SC	L, 2–4, ALN
2016–17	72	34	30	—	8	0	76	244	239	5th, North	2017	Did not qualify				
2017–18	72	35	28	—	8	1	79	248	245	5th, North	2018	Did not qualify				
2018–19	72	31	31	—	6	4	72	239	240	6th, Central	2019	Did not qualify				
2019–20	59	24	30	—	5	0	53	163	206	6th, Central	2020	Season cancelled due to the COVID-19 pandemic				
2020–21	68	22	39	—	6	1	51	196	241	7th, Eastern	2021	Did not qualify				
2021–22	72	37	31	—	4	0	78	243	247	3rd, Central	2022	—	W, 4–3, FW	L, 0–4, TOL	—	—
2022–23	72	29	38	—	5	0	63	223	244	5th, Central	2023	Did not qualify				
2023–24	71	38	28	—	4	1	81	232	204	3rd, Central	2024	—	W, 4–1, IND	L, 0–4, TOL	—	—
2024–25	72	43	25	—	3	1	90	225	194	2nd, North	2025	—	L, 1–4, NOR	—	—	—
2025–26	72	46	20	—	3	3	98	231	175	1st, North	2026	—	W, 4–1, REA	W, 4–3, MNE	L, 1–4, FLA	—
2026–27	11	4	4	—	2	1	5	29	37	5th, Central	2027	—	—	—	—	—

== Players and personnel ==
=== Notable NHL alumni ===
List of Wheeling Nailers/Thunderbirds alumni who played more than 25 games in Wheeling and 25 or more games in the National Hockey League.

- Paul Bissonnette
- Francis Bouillon
- Mike Condon
- Scott Darling
- Jason Jaffray
- Chris Jensen
- David Koci
- Zenon Konopka
- Francois Leroux
- Michel Ouellet
- Carter Rowney
- Dany Sabourin
- Ben Street
- Darcy Verot
- Tomáš Vokoun
- Chris Wells
- Ron Wilson.

=== Head coaches ===
- 1992–95 – Doug Sauter
- 1995–96 – Larry Kish
- 1996–97 – Tom McVie
- 1997–98 – Peter Laviolette
- 1998–99 – Chris Jensen
- 1999–2000 – Murray Eaves
- 2000–01 – Alain Lemieux
- 2001 – Joe Harney (interim)
- 2001–03 – John Brophy
- 2003–05 – Pat Bingham
- 2005–08 – Glenn Patrick
- 2008–10 – Greg Puhalski
- 2010–11 – Stan Drulia
- 2011–15 – Clark Donatelli
- 2015–16 – David Gove
- 2016–18 – Jeff Christian
- 2018–20 – Mike Bavis
- 2020–21 – Mark French
- 2021–25 – Derek Army
- 2025–2026 – Ryan Papaioannou
- 2026–present – Nate DiCasmirro

== Notes ==
1.The ECHL's Utah Grizzlies franchise also dates from 1981, but was dormant from 2003–2005.
