= Connor Jones (ice hockey) =

Canadian ice hockey player (born 1990)

- Born: August 16, 1990 (age 36) Montrose, British Columbia, Canada
- Height: 5 ft 9 in (175 cm)
- Weight: 176 lb (80 kg; 12 st 8 lb)
- Position: Forward
- Shot: Left
- Played for: New York Islanders; HC Thurgau; Västerviks IK
- NHL draft: Undrafted
- Playing career: 2014–2022 Coaching career
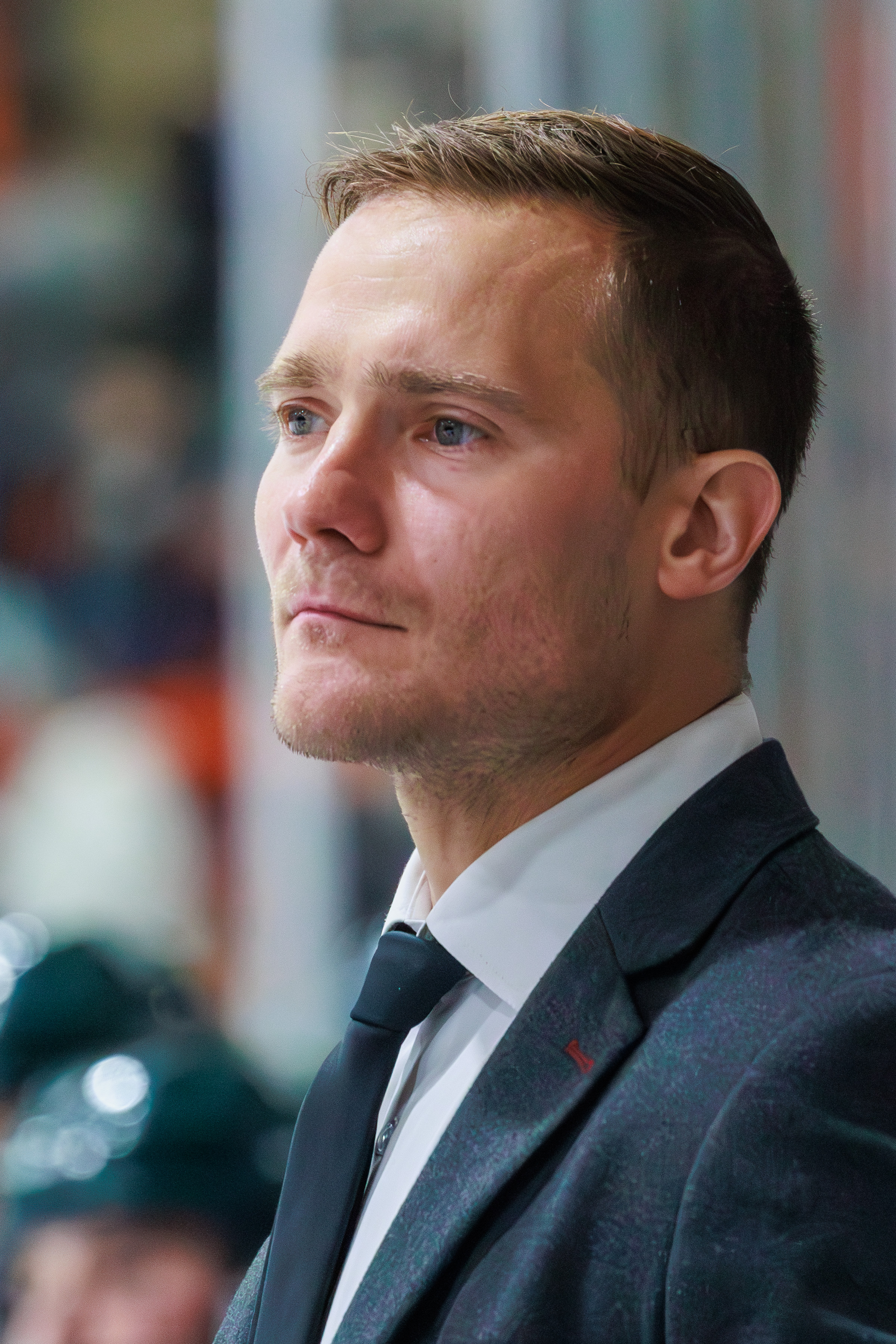

Current position
- Title: Head coach
- Team: Tahoe Knight Monsters

Biographical details
- Education: Quinnipiac University

Coaching career (HC unless noted)
- 2022–2024: Vegas Golden Knights (scout)
- 2024–2026: Princeton (asst.)
- 2026–present: Tahoe Knight Monsters

Connor Jones (born August 16, 1990) is a Canadian ice hockey coach and former professional forward who is currently head coach of the Tahoe Knight Monsters of the ECHL. Jones briefly appeared in the National Hockey League (NHL) with the New York Islanders.

== Career ==
Undrafted, Jones played collegiate hockey with Quinnipiac University of the ECAC from 2010 to 2014. Jones played a majority of his Quinnipiac career on a line with his identical twin brother Kellen, who was drafted by the Edmonton Oilers in the seventh round of the 2010 NHL entry draft. The Bobcats lost to Yale in the 2013 NCAA National Championship game. At the completion of his senior year as an alternate captain with the Bobcats, Jones embarked on his professional career in signing a one-year AHL contract for the 2014–15 season, with the Oklahoma City Barons, the primary affiliate of the Oilers, on April 3, 2014. He immediately joined the Barons on an amateur try-out basis to complete the 2013–14 season.

In the midst of his second season with the Bridgeport Sound Tigers in 2016–17, Jones was signed his first NHL contract on a one-year entry-level contract with parent affiliate, the New York Islanders on February 22, 2017. In the final stages of the Islanders season, Jones received his first NHL recall on April 2, 2017. Added to inject energy to the fourth-line, Jones made his debut that night in a 4–2 victory over the Buffalo Sabres.

Jones started the 2017–18 season with the Sound Tigers after he was cut from Islanders camp. He earned a three-game suspension for slew-footing Utica Comets defenceman Jordan Subban during a game on December 1, 2017.

At the completion of his contract with the Islanders, Jones became a free agent however opted to continue within the Islanders organization in signing a one-year AHL contract with the Sound Tigers on July 9, 2018. In his final season with the Sound Tigers in 2018–19, Jones contributed with 6 goals and 13 points in 67 games.

As an impending free agent, Jones reunited with his brother Kellen, signing a one-year contract as a duo with Swiss second-tier club, HC Thurgau of the Swiss League, on May 16, 2019.

Following a second season abroad with Västerviks IK of the HockeyAllsvenskan, Jones returned to North America as a free agent signing alongside his brother Kellen to a contract for the 2021–22 season with defending Kelly Cup champions, the Fort Wayne Komets of the ECHL, on August 31, 2021. Jones contributed with 39 points in 52 games with the Komets, before opting to end his eight year professional career at the conclusion of the season.

== Personal life ==
Connor and his twin brother Kellen, who was often a teammate through his professional career, grew up in Montrose, British Columbia, and both played hockey for Quinnipiac University and the Bridgeport Sound Tigers.

== Career statistics ==
			Regular season					Playoffs
Season	Team	League	GP	G	A	Pts	PIM	GP	G	A	Pts	PIM
2005–06	Beaver Valley Nitehawks	KIJHL	5	2	1	3	4	10	1	2	3	6
2006–07	Beaver Valley Nitehawks	KIJHL	52	26	46	72	156	13	3	4	7	47
2006–07	Vernon Vipers	BCHL	2	1	2	3	2	16	3	6	9	6
2007–08	Vernon Vipers	BCHL	50	24	30	54	50	10	3	9	12	2
2008–09	Vernon Vipers	BCHL	60	19	41	60	49	17	9	9	18	18
2009–10	Vernon Vipers	BCHL	51	36	45	81	40	19	9	11	20	22
2010–11	Quinnipiac University	ECAC	39	9	15	24	38	—	—	—	—	—
2011–12	Quinnipiac University	ECAC	37	13	28	41	30	—	—	—	—	—
2012–13	Quinnipiac University	ECAC	37	12	14	26	41	—	—	—	—	—
2013–14	Quinnipiac University	ECAC	40	15	23	38	42	—	—	—	—	—
2013–14	Oklahoma City Barons	AHL	5	0	0	0	2	—	—	—	—	—
2014–15	Bakersfield Condors	ECHL	27	10	16	26	29	—	—	—	—	—
2014–15	Oklahoma City Barons	AHL	41	4	6	10	31	10	3	0	3	2
2015–16	Bridgeport Sound Tigers	AHL	51	6	7	13	21	3	0	0	0	0
2016–17	Bridgeport Sound Tigers	AHL	58	5	14	19	89	—	—	—	—	—
2016–17	New York Islanders	NHL	4	0	0	0	2	—	—	—	—	—
2017–18	Bridgeport Sound Tigers	AHL	68	8	9	17	70	—	—	—	—	—
2018–19	Bridgeport Sound Tigers	AHL	67	6	7	13	55	5	0	0	0	4
2019–20	HC Thurgau	SL	44	8	19	27	50	5	1	0	1	4
2020–21	Västerviks IK	Allsv	29	3	10	13	18	10	0	3	3	31
2021–22	Fort Wayne Komets	ECHL	52	10	29	39	22	7	0	4	4	6
NHL totals			4	0	0	0	2	—	—	—	—	—

== Awards and honours ==
Award	Year
College
ECAC Third All-Star Team	2012
