= Rick Kowalsky =

Canadian ice hockey player (b. 1972)

- Born: March 20, 1972 (age 54) Simcoe, Ontario, Canada
- Height: 6 ft 1 in (185 cm)
- Weight: 195 lb (88 kg; 13 st 13 lb)
- Position: Right wing
- Shot: Right
- Played for: AHL; Cornwall Aces; Portland Pirates; Norfolk Admirals; ECHL; Hampton Roads Admirals; Trenton Titans; Roanoke Express; BIHS; Cardiff Devils
- NHL draft: 227th overall, 1992; Buffalo Sabres
- Playing career: 1993–2005

Rick Kowalsky (born March 20, 1972) is a Canadian ice hockey head coach former professional player. He was selected by the Buffalo Sabres in the 10th round (227th overall) of the 1992 NHL entry draft. He is currently the head coach and general manager of the Maine Mariners of the ECHL.

Kowalsky played four seasons (1989–1993) of major junior hockey with the Sault Ste. Marie Greyhounds of the Ontario Hockey League, scoring 54 goals and 100 assists for 144 points, while earning 259 penalty minutes, in 209 games played. He went on to play 12 seasons of professional hockey, including 183 games played in the American Hockey League and 516 games in the ECHL. Kowalsky retired as a player following the 2004–05 season during which he helped the Trenton Titans capture the Kelly Cup as the 2005 ECHL Champions. In 2017, he was elected into the ECHL Hall of Fame.

Kowalsky spent 15 seasons as a coach in the New Jersey Devils organization of the National Hockey League (NHL), including spent eight seasons as the head coach of their American Hockey League (AHL) affiliate, the Albany Devils and the Binghamton Devils. As the head coach for Albany in 2015–16, Kowalsky was named AHL Coach of the Year after leading the Devils to the second round of the playoffs. In 2021, he was hired by the New York Islanders, and his former boss Lou Lamoriello when he was with the Devils, as an assistant coach for their AHL affiliate, the Bridgeport Islanders. Upon head coach Brent Thompson’s departure to the Anaheim Ducks, Rick Kowalsky was promoted to be the head coach of the Bridgeport Islanders in July 2023. He was relieved as head coach of the Bridgeport Islanders on May 29, 2025.

He became head coach of the ECHL's Maine Mariners in August 2025.

== Career statistics ==
			Regular season					Playoffs
Season	Team	League	GP	G	A	Pts	PIM	GP	G	A	Pts	PIM
1989–90	Thessalon Flyers	NOJHL	8	2	4	6	46	—	—	—	—	—
1989–90	Sault Ste. Marie Greyhounds	OHL	43	1	0	1	23	—	—	—	—	—
1990–91	Sault Ste. Marie Greyhounds	OHL	46	5	9	14	59	13	4	4	8	17
1991–92	Sault Ste. Marie Greyhounds	OHL	66	25	44	69	119	19	6	10	16	39
1992–93	Sault Ste. Marie Greyhounds	OHL	54	23	47	70	58	18	7	6	13	35
1993–94	Cornwall Aces	AHL	65	9	8	17	86	—	—	—	—	—
1994–95	Hampton Roads Admirals	ECHL	49	29	24	53	114	4	0	4	4	4
1994–95	Cornwall Acres	AHL	9	2	1	3	38	—	—	—	—	—
1995–96	Hampton Roads Admirals	ECHL	52	21	29	50	121	—	—	—	—	—
1996–97	Hampton Roads Admirals	ECHL	52	14	26	40	94	9	5	4	9	16
1996–97	Portland Pirates	AHL	22	7	8	15	10	—	—	—	—	—
1997–98	Hampton Roads Admirals	ECHL	24	11	16	27	72	—	—	—	—	—
1997–98	Portland Pirates	AHL	39	11	25	36	78	10	5	2	7	8
1998–99	Portland Pirates	AHL	47	6	15	21	85	—	—	—	—	—
1999–00	Hampton Roads Admirals	ECHL	67	23	47	70	109	10	7	1	8	20
2000–01	Trenton Titans	ECHL	12	7	10	17	22	13	8	4	12	12
2001–02	Roanoke Express	ECHL	70	35	48	83	112	4	1	1	2	0
2001–02	Norfolk Admirals	AHL	1	0	0	0	0	—	—	—	—	—
2002–03	Roanoke Express	ECHL	68	27	55	82	132	4	0	1	1	6
2003–04	Roanoke Express	ECHL	67	31	45	76	122	4	1	2	3	6
2004–05	Roanoke Express	ECHL	55	23	29	52	81	20	10	13	23	26
AHL totals			183	35	57	92	297	10	5	2	7	8
ECHL totals			516	221	329	550	979	68	32	30	62	90
