= Bloomington Bison =

Professional ice hockey team

- City: Bloomington, Illinois
- League: ECHL
- Conference: Western
- Division: Central
- Founded: 2024
- Home arena: Grossinger Motors Arena
- Colors: Red, blue, white
- Owners: Hallett Sports and Entertainment
- General manager: Phillip Barski
- Head coach: Phillip Barski
- Captain: Eddie Matsushima
- Affiliates: Winnipeg Jets (NHL); Manitoba Moose (AHL)
- Website: bloomingtonbisonhockey.com

Franchise history
- 2024–present: Bloomington Bison

The Bloomington Bison are an American minor league ice hockey team based in Bloomington, Illinois. Founded in 2024, the team made its debut in the ECHL in 2024–25. They are the ECHL affiliate of the Winnipeg Jets and the Manitoba Moose.

== History ==
On January 16, 2024, the ECHL awarded an expansion team to Bloomington, Illinois. The ownership group consists of Jim Hallett of Hallett Sports and Entertainment, owners of the Indy Fuel. The club will play in Grossinger Motors Arena, which is located in Bloomington, Illinois. On May 30, it was announced that a five-year affiliation with the New York Rangers had been signed. In addition, Phillip Barski was named as the team's first head coach and general manager.

On July 8, 2026, it was announced that the Bison would become the new affiliate of the Winnipeg Jets, thus ending their affiliation with the New York Rangers.

== Season-by-season records ==
Bloomington Bison season-by-season records
| Regular season | | | | | | | | | | | Playoffs | | | | |
| Season | GP | W | L | OTL | SOL | Pts | GF | GA | PIM | Standing | Year | 1st round | 2nd round | 3rd round | Kelly Cup |
|---|---|---|---|---|---|---|---|---|---|---|---|---|---|---|---|
| 2024–25 | 72 | 31 | 35 | 4 | 2 | 68 | 187 | 210 | 804 | 7th of 7, Central | 2025 | did not qualify | | | |
| 2025–26 | 72 | 37 | 30 | 2 | 3 | 79 | 224 | 219 | 922 | 3rd of 7, Central | 2026 | L, 2–4, TOL | — | — | — |
