= Professional Hockey Players' Association =

American and Canadian labor union

PHPA
- Professional Hockey Players' Association
- Founded: 1967
- Headquarters: Niagara Falls, Ontario
- Location: Canada, United States
- Members: 1,600
- Key people: Brian Ramsay, executive director; Larry Landon, former executive director
- Website: phpa.com

The Professional Hockey Players' Association (PHPA), is the labor union that represents the interests of ice hockey players in the American Hockey League and ECHL, the two largest minor leagues in North American professional ice hockey. Established in 1967, the PHPA is one of the oldest players' unions in professional sports and the only minor league players' association within a major league sport. Recognized by the United States National Labor Relations Board as the certified bargaining unit for all members enrolled in the Association, the main function of the PHPA is to negotiate and protect various player benefits by way of a collective bargaining agreement. These benefits include: health and welfare benefits, training camp allowances, travel and trade relocation expenses, per diem, housing allowances, play-off shares, licensing rights, revenue-sharing, and membership assistance programs.

== History ==
The Professional Hockey Player's Association was founded in 1967 in Portland, Oregon, when members of the Portland Buckaroos (of the now defunct Western Hockey League (WHL)) recognized that Canadians playing hockey in the United States who were starting families would send their wives home to Canada to give birth to their babies. Canada's social insurance system would cover the expense for Canadian citizens in Canada, but the teams provided no coverage usable in the U.S. A number of Portland Buckaroos, including Doug Messier, Arlo Goodwin, and teammates, led the group and hired Portland attorney Curt Leichner as their legal counsel to legally form a WHL players association to allow WHL players to take advantage of group pension and health care plans, gaining better benefits through strength in numbers.

Over the course of the 1967–68 season, players from the American Hockey League saw the benefit of forming "a benevolent society" of their own and approached their WHL counterparts with the vision of creating one players' association which would represent all professional hockey players outside of the National Hockey League (NHL). On May 20, 1968, WHL and AHL players voted to form the "Professional Hockey Players’ Association".

After the 1973–74 season, former WHL president Max McNab became the fourth president of the Central Hockey League (CHL), a developmental league for professional minor league hockey players, which featured some teams that were affiliates for various NHL clubs. With a number of former WHL executives at the helm of the CHL, players were eager to organize a collective voice and become members of the PHPA. A small group of elected CHL player representatives was invited to the PHPA's annual meeting of player representatives to discuss the application to the PHPA among player representatives from the WHL and AHL. On May 17, 1974, a motion was passed whereby the CHL players' application for membership into the PHPA was accepted. CHL players were represented by the PHPA until 1984, when the league folded.

The WHL folded in 1974, citing financial pressures resulting from the WHL’s prime venues being taken by the expansion practices of the NHL and World Hockey Association (WHA). The PHPA remained healthy as it still represented players in two leagues, the AHL and CHL.

In 1985, players in the former International Hockey League (1945–2001) (IHL) petitioned the National Labor Relations Board (NLRB) to join the PHPA. IHL owners accepted the PHPA as the recognized bargaining unit for IHL players without the need for a formal NLRB vote.

In 1991, Larry Landon was asked by the PHPA Executive Committee to succeed Curt Leichner, who was preparing for retirement, as the new executive director. Landon assumed the role of deputy executive director until 1993, when he officially assumed control of the PHPA. Landon then moved the PHPA office from Portland, Oregon, to St. Catharines, Ontario.

In 1994, a group of players from the East Coast Hockey League approached Landon about being represented by the PHPA. At the 1994 PHPA Annual Meeting of Player Representatives, AHL and IHL player representatives unanimously approved the effort to unionize the ECHL, and during the 1994-95 season, PHPA staff initiated efforts to represent ECHL players. Eventually, on March 17, 1995, the NLRB conducted a formal, secret ballot vote among players in each ECHL city. The result was an overwhelming response from the players in favor of unionizing the ECHL, with the first PHPA-ECHL CBA finalized in October 1995.

By 2000, the AHL had a dramatically different look, as almost half of its twenty teams were new, and attendance had almost doubled since 1994. The IHL meanwhile, suffering from significant contraction and challenges in many of its markets, folded in 2001.

During the 2007–08 season, players in the CHL approached the PHPA with interest in PHPA representation of CHL players. On April 1, 2008, the NLRB recognized the PHPA as the official bargaining unit for CHL players, after a secret-ballot vote conducted by the NLRB. The league and PHPA reached an inaugural CBA in October 2009, which was retained until the CHL and ECHL consolidated in 2014.

In 2010, the PHPA relocated its headquarters to Niagara Falls, Ontario.

== Organization ==
The PHPA’s management is led an executive committee of player representatives from the AHL and ECHL, along with its executive director. For every five teams in a league, one player representative may be added to the executive committee. The committee assists the executive director in providing direction and oversight in dealing with various matter of importance to the association and its membership, including budgetary matters, player issues, strategic planning, and other business affairs. Larry Landon was the PHPA's long time Executive Director until his retirement in 2024. On August 9, 2024 the PHPA announced that it had appointed former Canadian Football League player and Canadian Football League Players' Association Executive Director Brian Ramsay as its new Executive Director.

== See also ==
- National Hockey League Players' Association, counterpart union for the National Hockey League
