= Maine Mariners (ECHL) =

ECHL franchise

- City: Portland, Maine
- League: ECHL
- Conference: Eastern
- Division: North
- Founded: 1989
- Home arena: Cross Insurance Arena
- Colors: Blue, green, silver
- Mascot: Beacon the Puffin
- Owner: Dexter Paine
- General manager: Rick Kowalsky
- Head coach: Rick Kowalsky
- Affiliates: Boston Bruins (NHL); Providence Bruins (AHL)
- Website: www.marinersofmaine.com

Franchise history
- 1989–2003: Anchorage Aces
- 2003–2017: Alaska Aces
- 2018–present: Maine Mariners

Championships
- Regular season titles: 0
- Division titles: 0
- Conference titles: 0
- Kelly Cups: 0

Current uniform
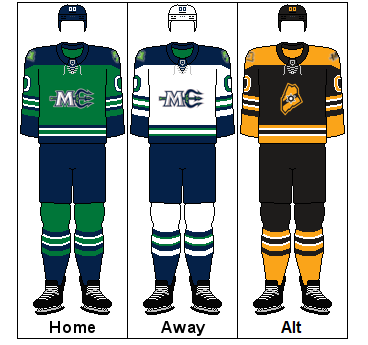

The Maine Mariners are a professional ice hockey team in the ECHL that began play in the 2018–19 season. Based in Portland, Maine, the team plays their home games at Cross Insurance Arena. The team participates in the North Division of the Eastern Conference. The team replaced the American Hockey League's Portland Pirates after the franchise became the Springfield Thunderbirds in 2016.

== History ==
=== Efforts to bring hockey back to Portland ===
On May 23, 2016, the Portland Pirates' franchise was sold and relocated to Springfield, Massachusetts, and became the Springfield Thunderbirds. A team of investors headed by former Pirates executives W. Godfrey Wood and Brad Church — the latter a former Portland player as well — announced their intentions to put an ECHL team in Portland to fill the void, joining as early as 2017. However, progress to attain a franchise by the Portland group stalled until four groups, none of which involved Wood, submitted their own proposals at the end of February 2017. By March 8, the arena owners had narrowed their choices to the proposals submitted by Spectra and National Sports Services, with both groups having been involved with managing ECHL teams in their past.

In June 2017, Comcast Spectacor, Spectra's parent company and the operators of the Cross Insurance Arena and the NHL's Philadelphia Flyers — the founders and NHL affiliate for years of the original Maine Mariners AHL franchise in Portland — purchased the franchise rights of the recently dormant Alaska Aces of the ECHL. The league approved of the sale and relocation of the franchise to Portland on June 15. Philadelphia Flyers president Paul Holmgren would serve as the team's governor with former player Daniel Brière overseeing the day-to-day operations. In August 2017, the team announced their five finalists for a team name: the Mariners, Watchmen, Lumberjacks, Puffins, and Wild Blueberries. The name was announced as the Mariners on September 29. On November 29, the Mariners' logo and color scheme were revealed. On February 17, 2018, the Mariners hired Riley Armstrong as head coach and Keith Rosenberg as on-ice assistant coach. On April 9, 2018, the Mariners announced they would be affiliated with the NHL's New York Rangers.

=== Early seasons ===
The new Mariners played their first game on October 13, 2018, a 6–3 loss to the Adirondack Thunder. Their inaugural game was at home with a reported attendance of 5,291.

Due to the COVID-19 pandemic, the ECHL cancelled the Mariners' final ten games of the 2019–20 season and the playoffs. Due to the ongoing effects of the pandemic, the Mariners voluntarily suspended operations for the 2020–21 ECHL season. The team would return for the 2021–22 season, and on June 30, 2021, the Mariners entered an affiliation agreement with the NHL's Boston Bruins and their AHL affiliate, the Providence Bruins, beginning with the 2021–22 season. The Bruins were the affiliate of the original AHL Mariners from 1987 to 1992, until the Bruins relocated the Mariners' franchise to Providence. In August 2021, head coach Armstrong was hired by the Philadelphia Flyers as an assistant coach with the Lehigh Valley Phantoms in the AHL and was replaced by the University of Maine men's hockey assistant coach and former NHL player Ben Guité.

On April 16, 2022, the Mariners clinched their first-ever playoff berth thanks to the Worcester Railers dropping their game to the Trois-Rivières Lions in OT and the Mariners beating the Newfoundland Growlers, clinching the final (4th) playoff spot in the North Division. In their first playoff series in team history, the Mariners lost to the Reading Royals, losing the series 4–2. Guité departed the Mariners after the season to become the head men's hockey coach at Bowdoin College, and he was replaced as Mariners head coach by Terrence Wallin on July 27, 2022.

The Mariners were able to clinch a playoff spot again in the 2022–23 ECHL season, getting the third seed in the division. They again played the Reading Royals in the first round and lost the series 4–2. In the 23–24 season, because of the termination of the Newfoundland Growlers' franchise rights with a handful of games remaining in the season, the ECHL announced that they would base the divisional standings for the North division on point percentage, with the top four teams in the North division making the playoffs. Combined with a tiebreaker over the Worcester Railers, this allowed the Mariners to make the playoffs for the third consecutive season. However, the team again failed to make it out of the first round, losing in seven games to the Adirondack Thunder.

=== Paine ownership ===
On July 23, 2024, financier Dexter Paine of nearby North Conway, New Hampshire, announced that he had reached an agreement to purchase the Mariners from Comcast Spectacor. The deal was finalized on September 30, 2024. The team finished with 70 points, their worst points total in franchise history excluding the pandemic-shortened 2019–20 season, and failed to make the playoffs in Paine's first year of ownership. It was the first time the team missed the playoffs since their inaugural season. Despite the on-ice struggles, the team set a single-game attendance record for their final home game of the season, a 4–2 win over the Adirondack Thunder. Following the season, Terrence Wallin resigned as both head coach and general manager to take an assistant coaching job with the AHL's Lehigh Valley Phantoms, and was replaced in both roles by Rick Kowalsky, an ECHL Hall of Famer as a player.

In the 2025–26 season, the Mariners finished 2nd in the North Division, their best result ever, and won a playoff round for the first time ever by defeating the Adirondack Thunder in seven games. The Mariners would be eliminated in the next round by the Wheeling Nailers in seven games.

== Season-by-season records ==
Regular season										Playoffs				
Season	GP	W	L	OTL	SOL	Pts	GF	GA	Standing	Year	1st round	2nd round	3rd round	Kelly Cup
2018–19	72	37	32	2	1	77	221	247	6th, North	2019	did not qualify			
2019–20	62	32	26	3	1	68	182	186	4th, North	2020	Season cancelled due to the COVID-19 pandemic			
2020–21	Opted out of participating due to the COVID-19 pandemic									2021	did not participate			
2021–22	72	33	31	5	3	74	230	236	4th, North	2022	L, 2–4, REA	—	—	—
2022–23	72	42	27	2	1	87	267	210	3rd, North	2023	L, 2–4, REA	—	—	—
2023–24	72	32	32	8	0	87	250	260	4th, North	2024	L, 3–4, ADR	—	—	—
2024–25	72	33	35	4	0	70	196	237	6th, North	2025	did not qualify			
2025–26	72	42	21	6	3	93	223	177	2nd, North	2026	W, 4–3, ADR	L, 3–4, WHL	—	—
