= ECHL =

Ice hockey league in North America

- Current season or competition: 2026–27 ECHL season
- Countries: United States (29 teams); Canada (1 team)
- Commissioner: Ryan Crelin
- Commissioner emeritus: Patrick J. Kelly
- First season: 1988–89
- No. of teams: 30 (31 by 2027–28)
- Feeder to: AHL, NHL
- Championship: Kelly Cup
- Recent champions: Florida Everblades (2026)
- Most successful club: Florida Everblades (5)
- Headquarters: Shrewsbury, New Jersey
- Website: www.echl.com

The ECHL (formerly known as the East Coast Hockey League) is a minor professional ice hockey league based in Shrewsbury, New Jersey, with teams across the United States and Canada. Competitively, it is a tier below the American Hockey League (AHL). The league serves as a farm system to the AHL and National Hockey League (NHL).

The ECHL and the AHL are the only minor leagues recognized by the collective bargaining agreement between the NHL and the National Hockey League Players' Association (NHLPA), meaning any player signed to an entry-level NHL contract and designated for assignment must report to a club in either the ECHL or the AHL. Additionally, the league's players are represented by the Professional Hockey Players' Association (PHPA) in negotiations with the ECHL itself. At least 739 players have played at least one game in the NHL after appearing in the ECHL.

As of the 2026–27 season, 29 of the 32 NHL teams hold affiliations with an ECHL team, with the Buffalo Sabres, New York Rangers, and Utah Mammoth having no such franchise affiliation. NHL teams sometimes lend contracted players to ECHL teams with which they have no affiliation agreements for development and increased playing time.

The league regular season typically starts up in October and it ends each April, followed by the Kelly Cup playoffs. The most recent playoff champions are the Florida Everblades after the 2026 postseason.

== History ==
The league, formed by Vinton, Virginia oil man Henry Brabham, and for whom the regular season championship trophy, the Brabham Cup, was named, combined teams from the defunct Atlantic Coast Hockey League (ACHL) and All-American Hockey League (AAHL), began to play as the East Coast Hockey League in 1988 with five teams – the (Winston-Salem, North) Carolina Thunderbirds (now the Wheeling Nailers); the Erie Panthers (folded in 2011 as the Victoria Salmon Kings); the Johnstown Chiefs (now the Greenville Swamp Rabbits); the Knoxville Cherokees (ceased operations as the Pee Dee Pride in 2005; folded in 2009 following failed relocation efforts); and the Virginia Lancers (now the Trenton Ironhawks).

In 2003, the West Coast Hockey League ceased operations, and the ECHL board of governors approved membership applications from the Anchorage/Alaska Aces, the Bakersfield Condors, the Fresno Falcons, the Idaho Steelheads, the Las Vegas Wranglers, the Long Beach Ice Dogs and the San Diego Gulls as well as from potential teams in Ontario, California, and Reno, Nevada. Alaska, Bakersfield, Fresno, Idaho, Las Vegas, Long Beach, and San Diego began play in the 2003–04 season as expansion teams. In a change reflective of the league's now-nationwide presence, the East Coast Hockey League shortened its name to the orphan initialism ECHL on May 19, 2003. The ECHL reached its largest size to date (31 teams) that season before being reduced to 28 teams for the 2004–05 season.

The ECHL has attempted to be more tech-friendly to its fans. Some improvements on the league's website have included a new schedule and statistics engine powered by League Stat, Inc. (introduced in 2006), internet radio coverage for most teams, and pay-per-view broadcasting of ECHL games through B2 Networks (a subsidiary of America One Broadcasting). In 2008, the league introduced the ECHL toolbar for web browsers, which gave users shortcut access to statistics, scores, transactions, and news updates.

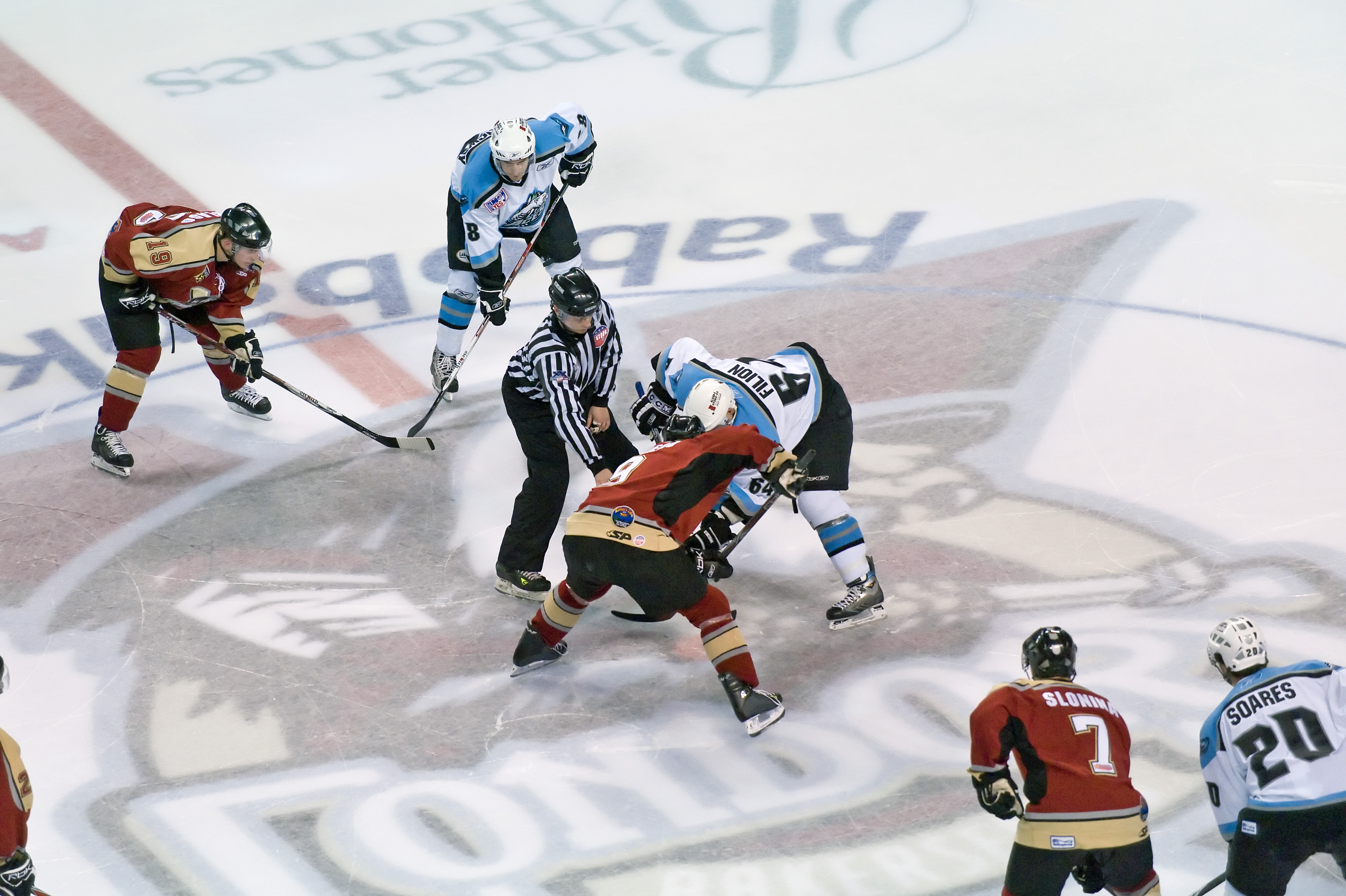
An ECHL game between the Bakersfield Condors and Alaska Aces in 2008

At the annual ECHL Board of Governors meeting on June 15, 2010, in Henderson, Nevada, the Board of Governors approved changes to the names of the conferences and divisions. The former American Conference (comprising eleven East Coast and Midwest teams) was renamed the Eastern Conference, while the National Conference (consisting of eight West Coast teams, including the league's only Canadian team at the time) was re-designated the Western Conference. Within the Eastern Conference, the East Division was renamed the Atlantic Division, and the Western Conference's former West Division was dubbed the Mountain Division.

The league lost its then-only Canadian team with the folding of the Victoria Salmon Kings subsequent to the 2010–11 season, but increased to 20 teams for the 2011–12 season with the addition of the expansion franchise Chicago Express and the Colorado Eagles who previously played in the Central Hockey League.

With the folding of the Chicago Express at the conclusion of the 2011–12 season and the announcement of expansion franchises the Orlando Solar Bears, San Francisco Bulls, Evansville IceMen, and Fort Wayne Komets (the latter two both in Indiana and both from the Central Hockey League (CHL) the league played the 2012–13 season with 23 teams. That number dropped to 22 for the 2013–14 season with the folding of the Trenton Titans and subsequently fell to 21 with the mid-season folding of the San Francisco Bulls on January 27, 2014.

On October 7, 2014, the ECHL announced that the seven remaining active members of the CHL (the Allen Americans, Brampton Beast, Quad City Mallards, Missouri Mavericks, Rapid City Rush, Tulsa Oilers and Wichita Thunder) would be admitted as new members for the 2014–15 season. The addition of the former CHL teams plus the expansion Indy Fuel raised the number of teams to 28 and placed a team in Canada for the first time since 2011.

Before the 2015–16 season, the American Hockey League (AHL) created a Pacific Division, which led the three California ECHL teams to relocate to former AHL cities with the Bakersfield Condors, Ontario Reign, and Stockton Thunder relocating to become the Norfolk Admirals, Manchester Monarchs, and Adirondack Thunder, respectively. By the 2018–19 season, the ECHL lost both the Quad City Mallards and Manchester Monarchs to folding, and the ECHL kept the Quad City Mallards name as a trademark. But the ECHL expanded into other markets recently vacated by the AHL with the Maine Mariners, Newfoundland Growlers, and Worcester Railers.

There were two expansion teams added in 2021–22, the Iowa Heartlanders and the Trois-Rivières Lions, with Iowa going into the Central Division and Trois-Rivières going into the North. This brought the league up to 27 teams. The league added the Savannah Ghost Pirates, bringing the league to 28 teams, and balancing the divisions for the 2022–23 season.

Two expansion teams were added for the 2024–25 season; the Tahoe Knight Monsters, and the Bloomington Bison. The Knight Monsters were placed in the Mountain division, with the Bison placed in the Central division. These additions were intended to bring the ECHL to 30 teams before the Newfoundland Growlers folded late in the 2023–24 ECHL season, but the league plans to expand 32 in the future to match the number of teams in the NHL and the AHL. On April 2, 2024, the league announced that following the termination of the Growlers' membership for failing to fulfill its obligations under league bylaws, the Wheeling Nailers would move to the North Division.

On October 18, 2024, the league announced a new expansion team for Greensboro, North Carolina set to begin play for the 2025–26 ECHL season, which became the Greensboro Gargoyles.

Two expansion teams were announced in 2025: the New Mexico Goatheads will begin play in Rio Rancho, New Mexico, for the 2026–27 ECHL season, and a new incarnation of the Augusta Lynx, which will begin play in Augusta, Georgia for the 2027–28 ECHL season.

On September 9, 2025, the Utah Grizzlies announced that they will relocate to Trenton, New Jersey, for the 2026–27 season and will be known as the Trenton Ironhawks.

On December 26, 2025, a lockout began due to a players strike from the Professional Hockey Players' Association, postponing all scheduled games until a deal was reached on December 27.

On March 9, 2026, the ECHL Board of Governors approved the voluntary suspension of operations for the Iowa Heartlanders. They would finish the remainder of the season, failing to make the playoffs, which they had only done once in their 5 years of play.

== Teams ==
- North Division
- South Division Central Division
- Mountain Division
- Mountain Division
- On Hiatus

Alignment, affiliations, and locations for the 2026–27 season.

Conference	Division	Team	City	Arena	Capacity	Founded	Joined	Current city since	Head coach	NHL affiliate	AHL affiliate
Eastern	North	Adirondack Thunder	Glens Falls, New York	Harding Mazzotti Arena	4,794	1990*		2015	Sylvain Cloutier	New Jersey Devils	Utica Comets
Eastern	North	Greensboro Gargoyles	Greensboro, North Carolina	First Horizon Coliseum	22,000	2024	2025		Mitch Giguère	Carolina Hurricanes	Chicago Wolves
Eastern	North	Maine Mariners	Portland, Maine	Cross Insurance Arena	6,206	1989*	2003	2018	Rick Kowalsky	Boston Bruins	Providence Bruins
Eastern	North	Norfolk Admirals	Norfolk, Virginia	Norfolk Scope	8,701	1995*	2003	2015	Jeff Carr	Independent	
Eastern	North	Reading Royals	Reading, Pennsylvania	Santander Arena	6,500	1991*		2001	Anthony Peters	Philadelphia Flyers	Lehigh Valley Phantoms
Eastern	North	Trenton Ironhawks	Trenton, New Jersey	Cure Insurance Arena	7,605	1981*	1988	2026	Chuck Weber	New York Islanders	Hamilton Hammers
Eastern	North	Trois-Rivières Lions	Trois-Rivières, Quebec	Colisée Vidéotron	4,390	2021			Ron Choules	Montreal Canadiens	Laval Rocket
Eastern	North	Worcester Railers	Worcester, Massachusetts	DCU Center	12,135	2017			Nick Tuzzolino	St. Louis Blues	Springfield Thunderbirds
Eastern	South	Atlanta Gladiators	Duluth, Georgia	Gas South Arena	11,355	1995*		2015	Matt Ginn	Nashville Predators	Milwaukee Admirals
Eastern	South	Florida Everblades	Estero, Florida	Hertz Arena	7,084	1998			Brad Ralph	Pittsburgh Penguins	Wilkes-Barre/Scranton Penguins
Eastern	South	Greenville Swamp Rabbits	Greenville, South Carolina	Bon Secours Wellness Arena	13,951	1987*	1988	2010	Chad Costello	Los Angeles Kings	Ontario Reign
Eastern	South	Jacksonville Icemen	Jacksonville, Florida	VyStar Veterans Memorial Arena	13,141	1992*	2012	2017	Sean Teakle	Minnesota Wild	Iowa Wild
Eastern	South	Orlando Solar Bears	Orlando, Florida	Kia Center	17,353	2012			Matt Macdonald	Tampa Bay Lightning	Syracuse Crunch
Eastern	South	Savannah Ghost Pirates	Savannah, Georgia	Enmarket Arena	7,485	2022			Jared Staal	Florida Panthers	Charlotte Checkers
Eastern	South	South Carolina Stingrays	North Charleston, South Carolina	North Charleston Coliseum	10,537	1993			Jesse Kallechy	Washington Capitals	Hershey Bears
Western	Central	Bloomington Bison	Bloomington, Illinois	Grossinger Motors Arena	7,000	2024			Phillip Barski	Winnipeg Jets	Manitoba Moose
Western	Central	Cincinnati Cyclones	Cincinnati, Ohio	Heritage Bank Center	14,453	1995*		2001	Riley Weselowski	Toronto Maple Leafs	Toronto Marlies
Western	Central	Fort Wayne Komets	Fort Wayne, Indiana	Allen County War Memorial Coliseum	10,480	1985*	2012		Ben Boudreau	Edmonton Oilers	Bakersfield Condors
Western	Central	Indy Fuel	Fishers, Indiana	Fishers Event Center	7,500	2014			Duncan Dalmao	Chicago Blackhawks	Rockford IceHogs
Western	Central	Kalamazoo Wings	Kalamazoo, Michigan	Wings Event Center	5,113	1999*	2009		Joel Martin	Vancouver Canucks	Abbotsford Canucks
Western	Central	Toledo Walleye	Toledo, Ohio	Huntington Center	7,389	1991			Pat Mikesch	Detroit Red Wings	Grand Rapids Griffins
Western	Central	Wheeling Nailers	Wheeling, West Virginia	WesBanco Arena	5,406	1981*	1988	1992	Nate DiCasmirro	Columbus Blue Jackets	Cleveland Monsters
Western	Mountain	Allen Americans	Allen, Texas	Credit Union of Texas Event Center	6,275	2009	2014		Steve Martinson	Ottawa Senators	Belleville Senators
Western	Mountain	Idaho Steelheads	Boise, Idaho	Idaho Central Arena	5,002	1997	2003		Everett Sheen	Dallas Stars	Texas Stars
Western	Mountain	Kansas City Mavericks	Independence, Missouri	Cable Dahmer Arena	5,800	2009	2014		Tad O'Had	Seattle Kraken	Coachella Valley Firebirds
Western	Mountain	New Mexico Goatheads	Rio Rancho, New Mexico	Rio Rancho Events Center	6,000	2025	2026		Zack Stortini	Colorado Avalanche	Colorado Eagles
Western	Mountain	Rapid City Rush	Rapid City, South Dakota	The Monument	7,500	2008	2014		Dave Smith	Calgary Flames	Calgary Wranglers
Western	Mountain	Tahoe Knight Monsters	Stateline, Nevada	Tahoe Blue Event Center	4,200	2024			Connor Jones	Vegas Golden Knights	Henderson Silver Knights
Western	Mountain	Tulsa Oilers	Tulsa, Oklahoma	BOK Center	17,096	1992	2014		Rob Murray	Anaheim Ducks	San Diego Gulls
Western	Mountain	Wichita Thunder	Wichita, Kansas	Intrust Bank Arena	13,450	1992	2014		Bruce Ramsay	San Jose Sharks	San Jose Barracuda

=== Future teams ===
Announced Future ECHL teams
Team	City	Arena	Capacity	Founded	Joining	Head coach	NHL affiliate	AHL affiliate
Augusta Lynx	Augusta, Georgia	New Augusta Arena	8,720	2025	2027	TBD	TBD	TBD

Representatives from all potential expansion franchises, markets that have been granted expansion franchises, and franchises that have suspended operations must attend the league's annual Board of Governors Meeting between seasons and provide progress reports on their situations in order to keep their ECHL franchise rights. For dormant and existing franchises, the Board of Governors votes whether or not to extend a franchise's league license until the next Board of Governors Meeting.

At the 2012 Board of Governors meeting, the Board elected to limit the league to 26 teams, with an emphasis on adding teams to the Western Conference. However, it was decided at the 2015 Board of Governors meeting that the cap should be expanded to 30 teams, hoping to eventually match the NHL and AHL's (then) 30-team totals. In 2023, ECHL commissioner Ryan Crelin commented that the eventual goal was to match the AHL and NHL expansion to 32 teams.

=== Defunct and relocated teams ===
Since its inaugural season, which started with five franchises, the ECHL has seen dozens of franchises join and leave the league. Typically, these teams fold or relocate due to operational issues or financial losses. The Johnstown Chiefs became the last remaining founding franchise of the East Coast Hockey League to remain in its original city until it relocated to Greenville, South Carolina, following the completion of the 2009–10 season.

While the ECHL has stated in recent years they would not grant voluntary suspensions of franchises for more than one year, both the Toledo Storm (now the Toledo Walleye) and Mississippi Sea Wolves (now defunct) were granted two-year suspensions—the Sea Wolves because of Hurricane Katrina and the Storm to demolish their arena at the time and construct a new one downtown. The Sea Wolves resumed play in the 2007–08 season, while the Walleye resumed play in the 2009–10 season.

Seven former ECHL franchises have been directly replaced in their respective markets by American Hockey League franchises. The Greensboro Monarchs were the first, being replaced by the Carolina Monarchs in 1995. The Hampton Roads Admirals were the second, giving way to the Norfolk Admirals in 2000. The Peoria Rivermen were the third. In their case, the replacement franchise retained the Worcester IceCats history but assumed the Rivermen identity for their first AHL season of 2005–06. The Charlotte Checkers were the fourth, yielding to a franchise that retained the Albany River Rats history following the club's move to Charlotte following the 2009–10 season and assumed the Checkers identity. In each of these cases, the ECHL franchise was relinquished to the league by its respective ownership group. In 2015, the three California franchises (Bakersfield Condors, Ontario Reign, and Stockton Thunder) were displaced by the formation of an AHL Pacific Division. Each ECHL franchise involved in the territorial shift was either owned or purchased by its NHL affiliate before being relocated.

- Alaska Aces (2003–2017; purchased and relocated to Portland, Maine, for the 2018–19 season.)
- Arkansas RiverBlades (1999–2003)
- Atlantic City Boardwalk Bullies (2001–2005; moved to Stockton, California.)
- Augusta Lynx (1998–2008; suspended operations and relinquished their membership back to the ECHL after their ownership group was unable to continue to operate in 2008–09. The first ECHL team to fold mid-season.)
- Bakersfield Condors (2003–15; the team moved to Norfolk, Virginia, to become the Norfolk Admirals and was replaced in the market by an AHL team of the same name.)
- Baton Rouge Kingfish (1996–2003; moved to Victoria, British Columbia, as the Victoria Salmon Kings.)
- Birmingham Bulls (1992–2001; moved to Atlantic City, New Jersey; now the Adirondack Thunder.)
- Brampton Beast (2014–2020; folded during the COVID-19 pandemic.)
- Carolina/Winston-Salem Thunderbirds (1988–1992; moved to Wheeling, West Virginia, as the Wheeling Thunderbirds before being renamed as the Wheeling Nailers.)
- Charlotte Checkers (1993–2010; replaced by the Charlotte Checkers of the AHL.)
- Chesapeake Icebreakers (1997–1999; moved to Jackson, Mississippi.)
- Chicago Express (2011–2012; membership relinquished to ECHL.)
- Colorado Eagles (2011–2018; organization obtained an expansion franchise in the AHL.)
- Columbia Inferno (2001–2008; voluntarily suspended operations.)
- Columbus Chill (1991–1999; suspended operations due to the then-impending entry of the Columbus Blue Jackets into the NHL; franchise purchased and relocated to Reading, Pennsylvania.)
- Columbus Cottonmouths (2001–2004; the team moved down to the Southern Professional Hockey League; ECHL franchise moved to Bradenton-Sarasota, Florida, to play as Gulf Coast Swords, franchise revoked in summer 2006 after construction halted on the proposed home arena.)
- Dayton Bombers (1991–2009; relinquished their membership back to ECHL.)
- Elmira Jackals (2007–2017)
- Erie Panthers (1988–1996; moved to Baton Rouge, Louisiana.)
- Evansville IceMen (2012–2016; moved to Jacksonville, Florida, after a one-year hiatus.)
- Fresno Falcons (2003–2008; suspended operations and relinquished their membership back to the ECHL after their ownership group was unable to continue to operate in 2008–09. The second ECHL team to fold mid-season.)
- Greensboro Generals (1999–2004)
- Greensboro Monarchs (1989–1995; replaced by the Carolina Monarchs of the AHL.)
- Greenville Grrrowl (1998–2006)
- Hampton Roads Admirals (1989–2000; replaced by the Norfolk Admirals of the AHL; ECHL franchise purchased in 2001 and moved to Columbus, Georgia, to become the Cottonmouths.)
- Huntington Blizzard (1993–2000; moved to Beaumont, Texas, to become the Texas Wildcatters.)
- Huntsville Blast (1993–1994; moved to Tallahassee, Florida.)
- Jackson Bandits (1999–2003)
- Jacksonville Lizard Kings (1995–2000)
- Johnstown Chiefs (1988–2010; relocated to Greenville, South Carolina, as the Greenville Road Warriors.)
- Knoxville Cherokees (1988–1997; moved to Florence, South Carolina, as the Pee Dee Pride.)
- Las Vegas Wranglers (2003–2014; suspended operations for the 2014–15 season and later relinquished their membership.)
- Lexington Men O' War (2002–2003; moved to West Valley City, Utah, to become the Utah Grizzlies)
- Long Beach Ice Dogs (2003–2007)
- Louisiana IceGators (1995–2005)
- Louisville IceHawks (1990–1994; moved to Jacksonville, Florida.)
- Louisville RiverFrogs (1995–1998; moved to Miami, Florida.)
- Macon Whoopee (2001–2002; moved to Lexington, Kentucky, to become the Lexington Men O' War.)
- Manchester Monarchs (2015–2019)
- Miami Matadors (1998–1999; moved to Cincinnati, Ohio.)
- Mississippi Sea Wolves (1996–2009; replaced in the market by the Mississippi Surge of the SPHL.)
- Mobile Mysticks (1995–2002; moved to Duluth, Georgia.)
- Nashville Knights (1989–1996; moved to Pensacola, Florida.)
- Newfoundland Growlers (2018–2024; ceased operations for failure to fulfill obligations under ECHL bylaws. The fourth ECHL team to fold mid-season.)
- New Orleans Brass (1997–2002; team relinquished their league membership after the arrival of the NBA's New Orleans Hornets.)
- Ontario Reign (2008–2015; the team moved to Manchester, New Hampshire, to become the Manchester Monarchs.)
- Pee Dee Pride (1997–2005; suspended operations after the 2004–05 season and planned to move to the Myrtle Beach area but later relinquished their membership.)
- Pensacola Ice Pilots (1996–2008; replaced in the market by the Ice Flyers of the SPHL.)
- Peoria Rivermen (1996–2005; replaced by the Peoria Rivermen of the AHL.)
- Phoenix RoadRunners (2005–2009)
- Quad City Mallards (2014–2018)
- Raleigh IceCaps (1991–1998; moved to Augusta, Georgia.)
- Richmond Renegades (1990–2003)
- Roanoke Express (1993–2004)
- San Diego Gulls (2003–2006)
- San Francisco Bulls (2012–2014; ceased operations and relinquished their membership back to the ECHL after their ownership group was unable to continue to operate in 2013–14. The third ECHL team to fold mid-season.)
- Stockton Thunder (2005–2015; team moved to Glens Falls, New York, to become the Adirondack Thunder.)
- Tallahassee Tiger Sharks (1994–2001; moved to Macon, Georgia.)
- Texas Wildcatters (2003–2008; moved to Ontario, California.)
- Trenton Titans/Devils (1999–2013)
- Utah Grizzlies (2005–2026; moved to Trenton, New Jersey, to become the Trenton Ironhawks.)
- Victoria Salmon Kings (2004–2011; replaced in market by the WHL's Victoria Royals.)
- Virginia Lancers/Roanoke Valley Rebels/Rampage (1988–1993; moved to Huntsville, Alabama.)

=== Timeline (1988/89–2002/03) ===
Current member Former member

=== Timeline (2003/04–2013/14) ===
Current member Former member Future member Opted out of season due to Hurricane Rita

=== Timeline (2014/15–present) ===
Current member Former member Future member Opted out of season due to COVID-19 pandemic Inactive

== Kelly Cup playoff format ==
For the 2012–13 season, eight teams still qualify in the Eastern Conference: the three division winners plus the next five teams in the conference. With the addition of the expansion franchise in San Francisco, the Board of Governors changed the Western Conference seeding such that eight teams qualify: two division winners and the next six teams in the conference. This eliminated the Western Conference first-round bye.

Similar to the National Hockey League (NHL) at the time, the division winners were seeded as the top three seeds in the Eastern Conference and the top two seeds in the Western Conference; the conference winner faced the eighth seed, second faces seventh, third faces sixth and fourth faces fifth in the conference quarterfinal round. The winner of the 1st/8th series played the winner of the 4th/5th series while the 2nd/7th winner played against the 3rd/6th winner in the conference semifinal series. The Board of Governors also elected to change the playoff format such that all rounds of the playoffs are now best of seven series. For 2012–13, the Conference Finals and Kelly Cup Finals used a two-referee system.

Because of the late addition of the CHL teams for the 2014–15 season and its subsequent conference alignment, the top four teams in each division qualified for the playoffs and the first two playoff rounds were played within the divisions.

For the realignment prior to the 2015–16 season, the playoffs changed once again to a six-division format. At the end of the regular season, the top team in each division qualified for the playoffs and be seeded either 1, 2, or 3 based on the highest point total earned in the season. Then the five non-division winning teams with the highest point totals in each conference qualified for the playoffs and be seeded 4 through 8. All four rounds will be a best-of-seven format.

The alignment changed back to four divisions for the 2016–17 season, but the playoffs kept the divisional format. The top four teams in each division qualify for the playoffs and play in the division for the first two rounds. After the division finals, the winners then play the conference finals, which are followed by the Kelly Cup finals.

== ECHL Hall of Fame ==
In celebration of the league's 20th year of play, the ECHL Board of Governors created the ECHL Hall of Fame in 2008, to recognize the achievements of players, coaches, and personnel who dedicated their careers to the league.

== See also ==
- Kelly Cup
- ECHL All-Star Game
- List of ECHL seasons
- List of developmental and minor sports leagues
- List of ice hockey leagues
- List of ECHL team owners
