= Cross Insurance Arena =

Sports arena in Portland, Maine

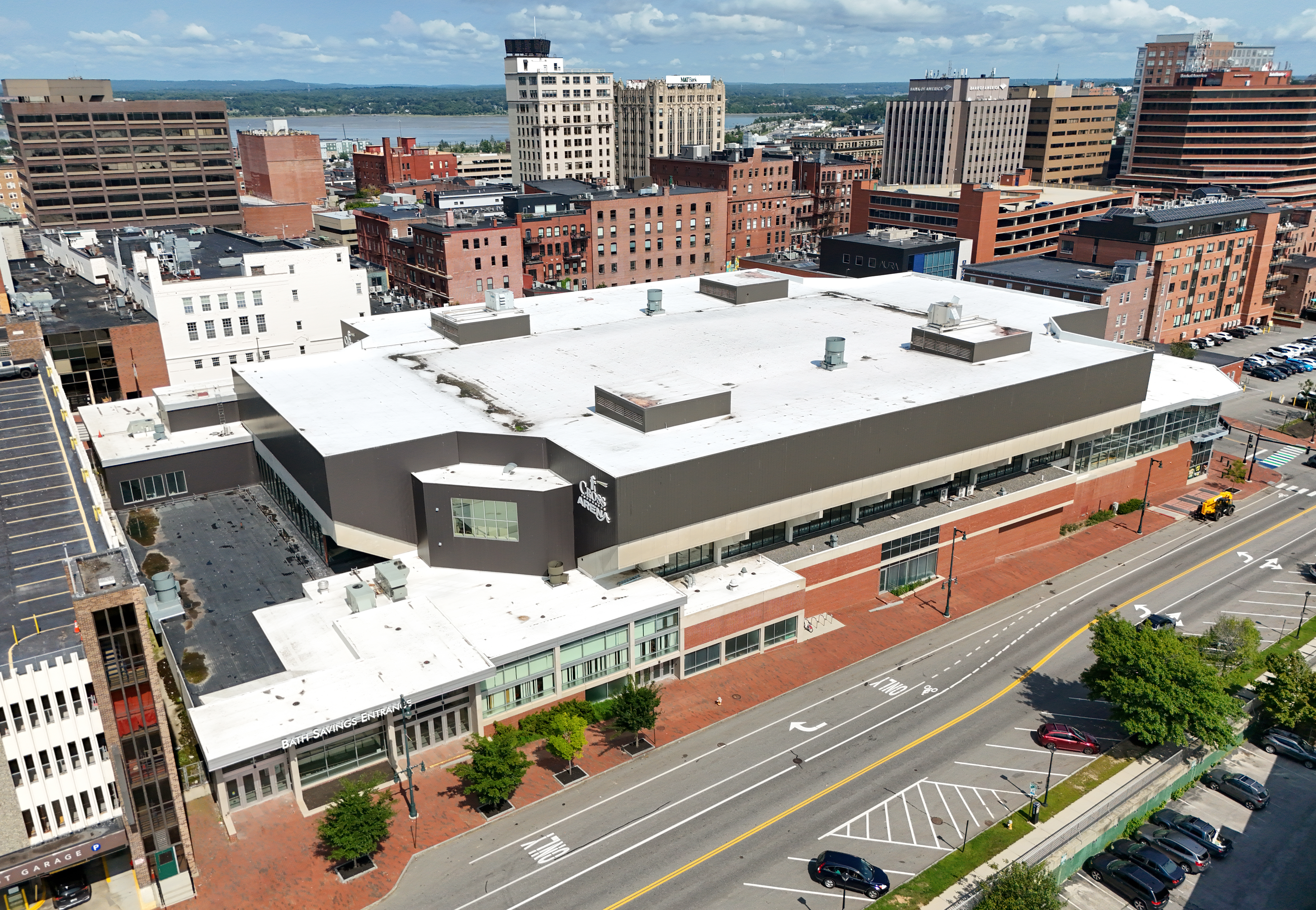
- Exterior view in 2024

- Location within Maine Location within the United States
- Former names: Cumberland County Civic Center (1977–2014)
- Address: 1 Civic Center Square
- Location: Portland, Maine
- Coordinates: 43°39′20″N 70°15′33″W
- Owner: Cumberland County
- Operator: Global Spectrum
- Capacity: Seats: 6,206; Concerts: 9,500
- Surface: Multi-surface

Construction
- Groundbreaking: 1975
- Opened: March 3, 1977
- Renovated: October 2012 – February 2014
- Cost: US$8 million ($42.5 million in 2025 dollars)
- Architects: Eduardo Catalano Architects; E. Crawley Cooper (original) Sink Combs Dethlefs & WBRC Architects (renovation)

Tenants
- Maine Mariners (AHL) (1977–1992); Portland Pirates (AHL) (1993–2016); New England Stingers (RHI) (1994); Portland Mountain Cats (USBL) (1996); Maine Mariners (ECHL) (2018–present); Maine Mammoths (NAL) (2018)

Cross Insurance Arena (formerly Cumberland County Civic Center) is a multi-purpose arena located in Portland, Maine. Built in 1977, at a cost of US$8 million, it is the home arena for the Maine Mariners of the ECHL. There are 6,206 permanent seats in the arena, and it seats up to 9,500 for concerts.

== History ==
The inside consists of one deck rising 24 rows, 14 seats across at its widest, and 30 separated sections around. The arena floor features 34,500 square feet (3,210 m^{2}) of space, making it useful for trade shows and conventions in addition to sports and concerts. The arena has locals sponsor individual seats at the arena. Those who pay to sponsor seats at the Cross Insurance Arena can have their name engraved on their seats or dedicate the seat to someone they know. The arena's official name is the George I. Lewis Auditorium at Cross Insurance Arena. The press box is named for local sportscaster Frank Fixaris.

ZZ Top was the very first headline act to play the arena when it opened on March 3, 1977.

Elvis Presley was to have flown from Memphis to Portland on August 16, 1977, for a performance at the arena the following day, but he was found dead at his Graceland mansion that morning. A re-enactment of the preparations for the Portland show is featured in the bio film This Is Elvis.

The venue hosted the America East Conference (then the ECAC North) men's basketball tournament in 1980. Two AHL hockey clubs that have called the arena home, include the Portland Pirates and three time Calder Cup champions, the Maine Mariners.

On December 8, 1997, WWE held a Raw is War taping. On December 4, 2009, Total Nonstop Action Wrestling (TNA) held their first house show in Maine at the Cumberland Civic Center.

The United States Lacrosse League announced that the Maine Moose Trax would play its home games at the Cross Insurance Arena when the league was to begin play in the fall of 2014, though arena trustees called the announcement premature and stated no final agreement had been reached. It was the first franchise announced for the league, but the league never played any matches.

Arena trustees reached a 10-year agreement in June 2014 with Cross Insurance Agency for the sale of the facility's naming rights for $2.5 million. The facility was renamed Cross Insurance Arena despite the fact that Cross Insurance also holds the naming rights to Bangor's Cross Insurance Center, 130 miles (210 km) away. Both parties to the deal state that there should be no confusion between the two facilities. The deal was also signed despite the naming rights of one of the entrances being named for the Clark Insurance company, though Clark Insurance stated their deal would remain.

The arena is also the alternate home ice of the Maine Black Bears men's ice hockey team, who normally play at Alfond Arena in Orono, Maine.

== Renovations and lease dispute ==
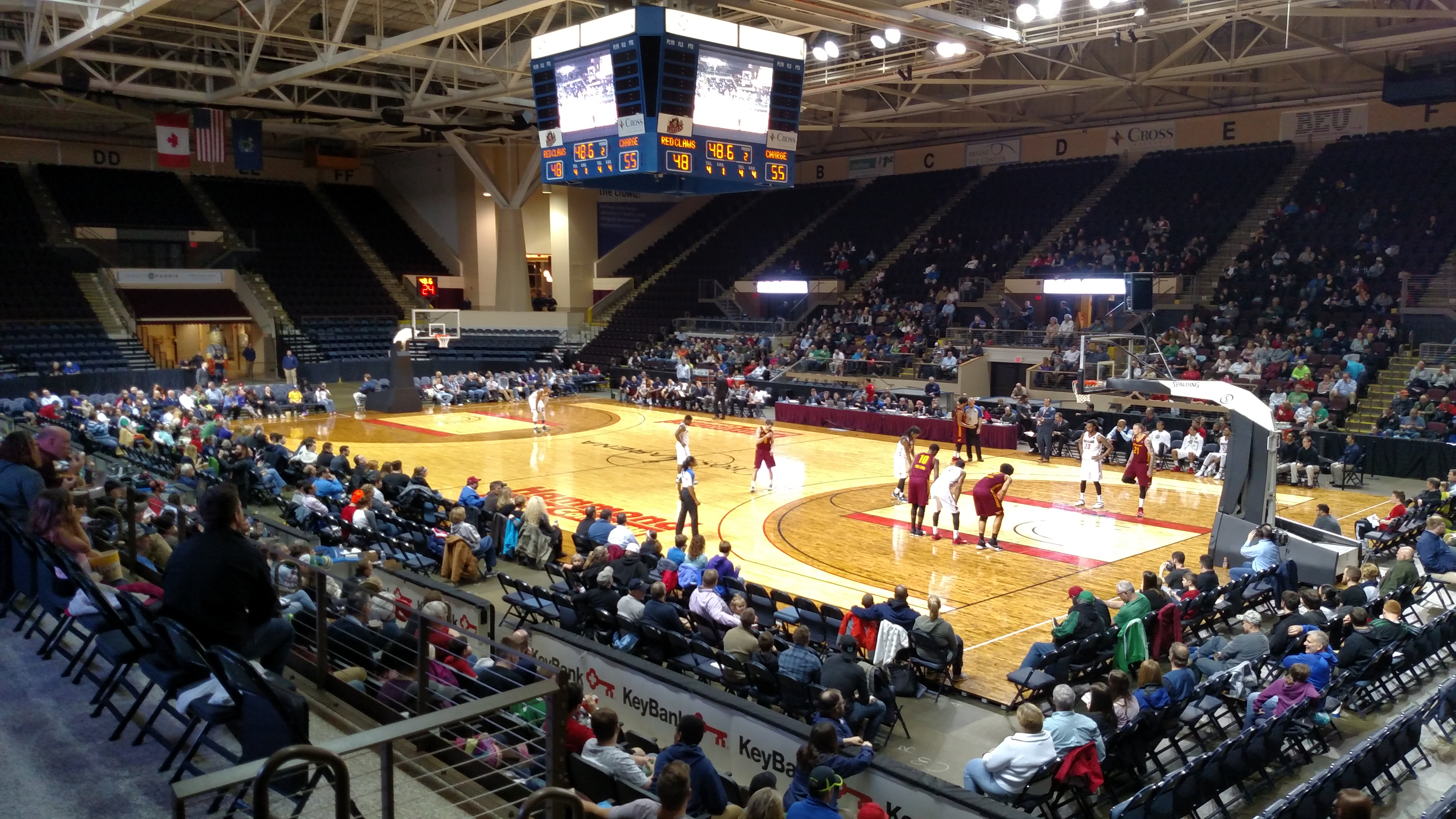
The Maine Red Claws playing a game at the renovated arena.

In October 2010, a task force voted to fund renovations costing $27 to $29 million. The renovations will include addition of premium seating, as well as upgrades to the locker rooms, an increased number of restrooms, and other improvements. The renovations would add just over 34,000 square feet to the building. It required approval by both the then-civic center board and approval of a bond issue by county voters.

The bond was approved by county voters in November 2011. Renovations began after the 2011–12 hockey season. Following completion of the Portland Pirates' 2012–13 season, the arena closed for a second renovation phase, and was scheduled to reopen in January 2014. The Pirates intended to play the first portion of their 2013–14 season at the Androscoggin Bank Colisée, through at least December 31. All renovations were completed by February 2014, and the first event in the facility was scheduled to be the Maine Home, Remodeling and Garden Show on Saturday, February 15.

Civic Center trustees in 2013 ceased negotiations with the Pirates over terms of a new lease, and further stated they would seek new tenants for the calendar slots originally given to the Pirates. The Pirates announced on September 26, 2013, that the entire 2013–2014 home schedule would be played at the Androscoggin Bank Colisée in Lewiston over the dispute, instead of the, already scheduled, first 13 games. The dispute was primarily over share of food and beverage sales the Pirates would receive, though other issues existed. The Pirates are not able to share revenues of alcohol, due to not being the property's owner. Therefore, management asked for a larger percentage of food revenues. Civic Center trustees stated that they only break even on the presence of the Pirates in the building, and that their expenses would actually be less without them. The Chairman of the Board of Trustees further criticized the Pirates for demanding more of a "subsidy" for themselves and stated their desired lease agreement would cost county taxpayers money. The Pirates also stated they would continue a lawsuit against the arena with the hopes of playing there in the future.

New Pirates majority owner Ron Cain announced on December 19, 2013, that the team dropped its lawsuit and that arena trustees would resume negotiations, both seeking "to strike a balance between the team's business needs and the arena's financial obligations" according to Cain. The chairman of the trustees stated that he found Cain's comments on the issue "constructive" and he thus was willing to restart talks.

Maine Senate President Justin Alfond, who is from Portland, announced that he submitted emergency legislation to the Maine Legislature to allow the Pirates to receive a share of alcohol revenue, as the original agreement called for but was ruled to be illegal. Cain said that Alfond's efforts did not play a role in their decision on the lawsuit, but could help the team going forward.

On February 4, 2014, arena trustees and the Pirates announced that a 5-year lease agreement had been reached and that the team would return to the not yet renamed Civic Center for the 2014–15 season. The agreement includes the sharing of concessions revenue the Pirates sought, which may or may not include alcohol sales pending passage of Sen. Alfond's bill.

However, on May 4, 2016, it was announced that the Portland Pirates had signed a letter of intent to sell the franchise and would relocate the team to Springfield, Massachusetts. Less than a week after the announcement, a team of investors headed by former Pirates executives W. Godfrey Wood and Brad Church announced their intentions to put an ECHL team in Portland to fill the void, possibly joining as early as 2017. It would take an extra year, but Comcast Spectacor, the arena owners, purchased the franchise rights of the Alaska Aces and relocated the team to Portland for the 2018–19 season as a new version of the Maine Mariners.

== See also ==
- List of indoor arenas in the United States
- Hadlock Field

Events and tenants
Preceded by Baltimore Arena (as Baltimore Skipjacks); Androscoggin Bank Colisée	Home of the Portland Pirates; 1993 – 2013; 2014 – 2016	Succeeded by Androscoggin Bank Colisée; MassMutual Center
Preceded by first arena	Home of the Maine Mariners; 1977 – 1987; 1987 – 1992	Succeeded by Utica Memorial Auditorium (as Utica Devils); Providence Civic Center (as Providence Bruins)
