= Tahoe Blue Event Center =

Sports venue in Nevada, United States

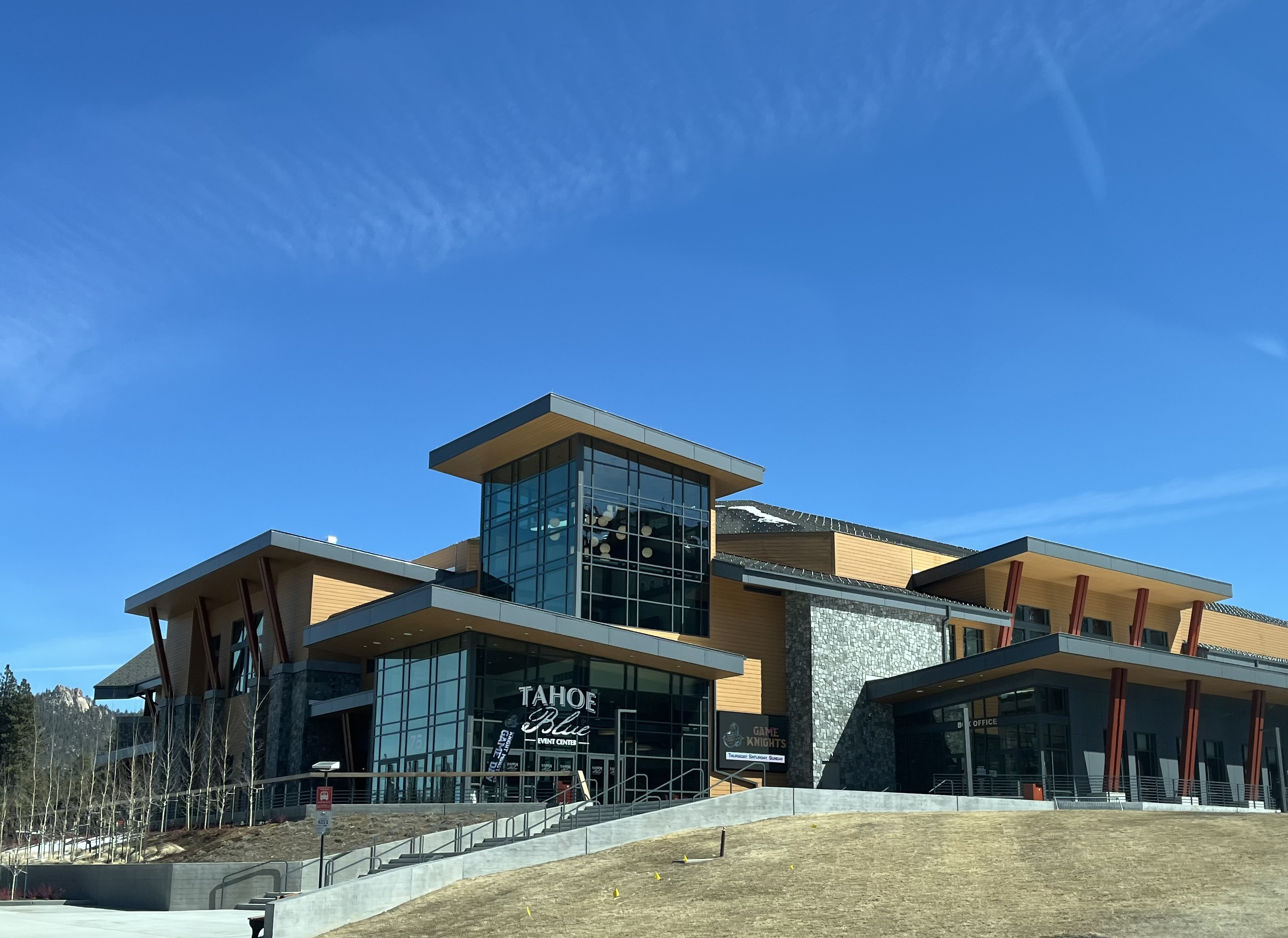

- Location in Nevada Location in the United States Location in North America
- Interactive map of Tahoe Blue Event Center
- Former names: South Tahoe Event Center (planning)
- Address: 75 U.S. 50
- Location: Stateline, Nevada, U.S.
- Coordinates: 38°57′45.9″N 119°56′18.5″W
- Owner: Tahoe Douglas Visitors Authority
- Operator: OVG360
- Capacity: 5,000 (Concerts); 4,700 (Basketball); 4,203 (Hockey); 2,500–5,300 (Performing Arts); 3,000–5,000 (Trade Shows)

Construction
- Groundbreaking: July 9, 2020; 6 years ago
- Opened: September 23, 2023; 3 years ago
- Cost: $100 million

Tenant
- Tahoe Knight Monsters (ECHL) (2024–present)

Tahoe Blue Event Center is an indoor arena located in Stateline, Nevada, in the United States. It is home to the Tahoe Knight Monsters of the ECHL ice hockey league. It has a capacity of 5,000. Grand Opening occurred on September 23, 2023. It is owned by the Tahoe Douglas Visitors Authority and operated by OVG360.
