= Tahoe Knight Monsters =

Ice hockey team

- City: Stateline, Nevada
- League: ECHL
- Conference: Western
- Division: Mountain
- Founded: 2024
- Home arena: Tahoe Blue Event Center
- Colors: Light blue, gold, black
- Owners: David Hodges (Majority); Tim & Demi Tebow (Minority); Chip & Joanna Gaines (Minority)
- Head coach: Connor Jones
- Captain: Luke Adam
- Media: FOX 5 Las Vegas; ABC 8 (Reno); Mixlr (Radio Internet)
- Affiliates: Vegas Golden Knights (NHL); Henderson Silver Knights (AHL)
- Website: knightmonstershockey.com

The Tahoe Knight Monsters are an American minor league professional ice hockey team based in the Lake Tahoe area. The team made its debut in the ECHL in the 2024–25 season, playing their home games at Tahoe Blue Event Center in Stateline, Nevada.

Currently, the Knight Monsters are affiliated with the Vegas Golden Knights of the National Hockey League and the Henderson Silver Knights of the American Hockey League.

== History ==
On July 10, 2023, the ECHL awarded an expansion team to the Lake Tahoe area to start play in the 2024–25 season. The ownership group consists of Tim Tebow and David Hodges. The club will play in the newly constructed Tahoe Blue Event Center located in Stateline, Nevada, near South Lake Tahoe, California. The Knight Monsters broadcaster and manager of communications is Brenden Paul.

First Tahoe Knight Monsters Logo (2024-2026)

On November 30, 2023, the team unveiled its name and logo, noting inspiration from the folklore monster Tahoe Tessie.

On July 16, 2024 after months of speculation, the Knight Monsters announced a multi-year affiliation agreement with the Vegas Golden Knights and Henderson Silver Knights.

On October 14th 2026 Knight Monsters announced there affiliation extension with the Vegas Golden Knights and Henderson Silver Knights with options to extend through 2029

== Season-by-season record ==
Note: GP = Games played, W = Wins, L = Losses, OTL = Overtime losses, SOL = shootout losses, Pts = Points, GF = Goals for, GA = Goals against, PIM = Penalties in minutes

Regular season											Playoffs				
Season	GP	W	L	OTL	SOL	Pts	GF	GA	PIM	Standing	Year	1st round	2nd round	3rd round	Kelly Cup
2024–25	72	41	25	4	2	88	255	228	1452	3rd, Mountain	2025	W, 4–0, WIC	L, 0–4, KC	—	—
2025–26	72	35	30	4	3	77	257	260	1052	4th, Mountain	2026	L, 0–4, KC	—	—	—

== Players ==
=== Team captain ===
- Luke Adam (2024–present)

== Head coach ==
- Alex Loh (2024–2026)
- Connor Jones (2026–present)
