= 2017 Kelly Cup playoffs =

Tournament details
- Dates: April 12 – June 5
- Teams: 16

Final positions
- Champions: Colorado Eagles
- Runners-up: South Carolina Stingrays

Tournament statistics
- Scoring leader(s): Alex Belzile (Colorado) (26 points)

The 2017 Kelly Cup Playoffs of the ECHL began on April 12, 2017, following the conclusion of the 2016–17 ECHL regular season.

== Playoff format ==
At the end of the regular season the top four teams in each division qualify for the playoffs and are seeded one through four based on highest point total earned in the season. The first two rounds of the playoffs are held within the division with the first seed facing the fourth seed and the second seed facing the third. The division champions then play each other in a conference championship. The Kelly Cup finals pits the Eastern Conference champion against the Western Conference champion. All four rounds are a best-of-seven format.

== Playoff seeds ==
After the regular season, 16 teams qualify for the playoffs. On March 4, the Toledo Walleye were the first team to qualify during the regular season and on April 8 they clinched the Brabham Cup with the best record in the ECHL.

=== Eastern Conference ===
==== North Division ====
1. Adirondack Thunder – North Division champions, 93 pts
2. Reading Royals – 88 pts
3. Brampton Beast – 88 pts
4. Manchester Monarchs – 85 pts

==== South Division ====
1. Florida Everblades – South Division champions, 97 pts
2. Greenville Swamp Rabbits – 86 pts
3. South Carolina Stingrays – 84 pts
4. Orlando Solar Bears – 82 pts

=== Western Conference ===
==== Central Division ====
1. Toledo Walleye – Central Division champions, Brabham Cup winners, 106 pts
2. Fort Wayne Komets – 98 pts
3. Quad City Mallards – 84 pts
4. Kalamazoo Wings – 80 pts

==== Mountain Division ====
1. Allen Americans – Mountain Division champions, 104 pts
2. Colorado Eagles – 99 pts
3. Idaho Steelheads – 91 pts
4. Utah Grizzlies– 79 pts

== Playoff brackets ==
Division semifinals	Division finals
N1	Adirondack Thunder	2
N4	Manchester Monarchs	4
N4	Manchester	4
North Division
N3	Brampton	2
N2	Reading Royals	2
N3	Brampton Beast	4
Eastern Conference
S1	Florida Everblades	4
S4	Orlando Solar Bears	3
S1	Florida	1
South Division
S3	South Carolina	4
S2	Greenville Swamp Rabbits	2
S3	South Carolina Stingrays	4
C1	Toledo Walleye	4
C4	Kalamazoo Wings	3
C1	Toledo	4
Central Division
C2	Fort Wayne	1
C2	Fort Wayne Komets	4
C3	Quad City Mallards	1
Western Conference
M1	Allen Americans	4
M4	Utah Grizzlies	1
M1	Allen	2
Mountain Division
M2	Colorado	4
M2	Colorado Eagles	4
M3	Idaho Steelheads	1

Conference finals
N4	Manchester	3
S3	South Carolina	4
C1	Toledo	1
M2	Colorado	4

Kelly Cup finals
S3	South Carolina	0
M2	Colorado	4

== Division semifinals ==
Home team is listed first.

=== North Division ===
==== (1) Adirondack Thunder vs. (4) Manchester Monarchs ====
Because of the unavailability of the SNHU Arena during most of the first round, Adirondack were scheduled to host five of the seven games; this resulted in a 2–5 schedule where the lower seeded team hosted the first two games.

April 14	Manchester Monarchs	3–1	Adirondack Thunder	SNHU Arena	Recap
David Kolomatis (1) – 9:54		First period	No scoring
Daniel Doremus (1) – 4:55		Second period	18:49 – pp – Ryan Culkin (1)
Quentin Shore (1) – en – 19:53		Third period	No scoring
Sam Brittain 24 saves / 25 shots		Goalie stats	J. P. Anderson 21 saves / 23 shots

April 15	Manchester Monarchs	4–2	Adirondack Thunder	SNHU Arena	Recap
Matt Leitner (1) – 16:18		First period	11:13 – pp – Alex Wall (1)
Quentin Shore (2) – pp – 16:39		Second period	2:10 – Alex Wall (2)
Ashton Rome (1) – pp – 4:58; Matt Leitner (2) – sh – en – 19:05		Third period	No scoring
Sam Brittain 22 saves / 24 shots		Goalie stats	J. P. Anderson 24 saves / 27 shots

April 18	Adirondack Thunder	3–1	Manchester Monarchs	Glens Falls Civic Center	Recap
No scoring		First period	No scoring
Alex Wall (3) – 3:11; Dennis Kravchenko (1) – 10:30		Second period	No scoring
Gunnar Hughes (1) – 12:36		Third period	19:37 – pp – David Kolomatis (2)
J. P. Anderson 26 saves / 27 shots		Goalie stats	Sam Brittain 34 saves / 37 shots

April 20	Adirondack Thunder	1–2	Manchester Monarchs	Glens Falls Civic Center	Recap
Cullen Bradshaw (1) – 15:46		First period	4:28 – pp – Ashton Rome (2)
No scoring		Second period	No scoring
No scoring		Third period	4:52 – Zac Lynch (1)
J. P. Anderson 14 saves / 16 shots		Goalie stats	Sam Brittain 29 saves / 30 shots

April 22	Adirondack Thunder	2–1	Manchester Monarchs	Glens Falls Civic Center	Recap
Peter MacArthur (1) – 9:58		First period	16:41 – Colton Saucerman (1)
No scoring		Second period	No scoring
Dennis Kravchenko (2) – 3:03		Third period	No scoring
J. P. Anderson 25 saves / 26 shot		Goalie stats	Sam Brittain 28 saves / 30 shots

April 25	Adirondack Thunder	5–6	OT	Manchester Monarchs	Glens Falls Civic Center	Recap
Dennis Kravchenko (3) – 11:25		First period		13:24 – pp – Matt Leitner (3)
Dennis Kravchenko (4) – 6:06; James Henry (1) – 12:34; Brian Ward (1) – 15:10		Second period		6:23 – Tyler Sikura (1); 9:17 – Kevin Morris (1)
Patch Alber (1) – 17:26		Third period		0:26 – Tyler Sikura (2); 10:04 – Zac Lynch (2)
No scoring		First overtime period		2:57 – Cory Ward (1)
J. P. Anderson 37 saves / 43 shots		Goalie stats		Sam Brittain 26 saves / 31 shots

Manchester won series 4–2

==== (2) Reading Royals vs. (3) Brampton Beast ====
April 13	Reading Royals	2–1	Brampton Beast	Santander Arena	Recap
Robbie Czarnik (1) – 7:10		First period	No scoring
Todd Perry (1) – 9:50		Second period	13:25 – PP – Connor Crisp (1)
No scoring		Third period	No scoring
Mark Dekanich 44 shots / 43 saves		Goalie stats	Andrew D'Agostini 36 shots / 34 saves

April 15	Reading Royals	1–2	OT	Brampton Beast	Santander Arena	Recap
Ryan Penny (1) – 2:32		First period		No scoring
No scoring		Second period		No scoring
No scoring		Third period		16:14 – Tim Billingsley (1)
No scoring		First overtime period		14:47 – Jordan Henry (1)
Mark Dekanich 40 shots / 38 saves		Goalie stats		Zachary Fucale 31 shots / 30 saves

April 18	Brampton Beast	2–1	Reading Royals	Powerade Centre	Recap
Chris Auger (1) – PP – 12:28; David Vallorani (1) – 15:00		First period	No scoring
No scoring		Second period	15:15 – PP – Matt Willows (1)
No scoring		Third period	No scoring
Zachary Fucale 26 shots / 25 saves		Goalie stats	Mark Dekanich 32 shots / 30 saves

April 20	Brampton Beast	2–3	Reading Royals	Powerade Centre	Recap
No scoring		First period	17:55 – Olivier Labelle (1)
Jordan Henry (2) – 12:44		Second period	No scoring
Brandon MacLean (1) – 4:55		Third period	0:57 – Robbie Czarnik (2); 14:35 – PP – Ryan Penny (2)
Zachary Fucale 30 shots / 27 saves		Goalie stats	Mark Dekanich 38 shots / 36 saves

April 22	Brampton Beast	2–1	2OT	Reading Royals	Powerade Centre	Recap
No scoring		First period		No scoring
No scoring		Second period		No scoring
Brandon MacLean (2) – 8:55		Third period		10:52 – Olivier Labelle (2)
Brandon MacLean (3) – 15:34		Second overtime period		No scoring
Zachary Fucale 44 shots / 43 saves		Goalie stats		Mark Dekanich 52 shots / 50 saves

April 24	Reading Royals	1–3	Brampton Beast	Santander Arena	Recap
Justin Crandall (1) – 16:12		First period	No scoring
No scoring		Second period	No scoring
No scoring		Third period	7:21 – Luke Pither (1); 13:38 – Brandon Marino (1); 19:45 – EN – Brandon Marino (2)
Mark Dekanich 33 shots / 31 saves		Goalie stats	Zachary Fucale 41 shots / 40 saves

Brampton won series 4–2

=== South Division ===
==== (1) Florida Everblades vs. (4) Orlando Solar Bears ====
April 12	Florida Everblades	2–4	Orlando Solar Bears	Germain Arena	Recap
Matt Berry (1) – 14:13		First period	11:28 – Taylor Doherty (1)
No scoring		Second period	4:58 – PP – Taylor Doherty (2); 10:51 – Chris Crane (1)
Matt Berry (2) – 0:11		Third period	19:21 – EN – Denver Manderson (1)
Alex Nedeljkovic 29 shots / 26 saves		Goalie stats	Ryan Massa 32 shots / 30 saves

April 14	Florida Everblades	2–3	Orlando Solar Bears	Germain Arena	Recap
No scoring		First period	3:45 – Ryan Moore (1)
Matt Berry (3) – 15:17		Second period	15:50 – Eric Baier (1)
Michael Kirkpatrick (1) – 1:08		Third period	11:30 – Justin Buzzeo (1)
Alex Nedeljkovic 22 shots / 19 saves		Goalie stats	Ryan Massa 38 shots / 36 saves

April 20	Orlando Solar Bears	5–4	OT	Florida Everblades	Amway Center	Recap
Denver Manderson (2) – 7:39		First period		3:44 – Brendon O'Donnell (1); 5:36 – Mitchell Heard (1)
Mason Marchment (1) – 0:39		Second period		4:32 – SH – Mike Ferrantino
Denver Manderson (3) – 2:37; Eric Faille (1) – 3:05		Third period		7:01 – PP – Mike Ferrantino (2)
No scoring		First overtime period		12:52 – PP – Brendon O'Donnell (2)
Ryan Massa 41 shots / 36 saves		Goalie stats		Anthony Peters 36 shots / 32 saves

April 22	Orlando Solar Bears	3–0	Florida Everblades	Amway Center	Recap
Justin Buzzeo (2) – 7:28		First period	No scoring
No scoring		Second period	No scoring
Shane Conacher (1) – 7:18; Taylor Doherty (3) – EN – 18:52		Third period	No scoring
Ryan Massa 42 shots / 42 saves Mitch Gillam 0 shots / 0 saves		Goalie stats	Alex Nedeljkovic 33 shots / 31 saves Anthony Peters 0 shots / 0 saves

April 23	Orlando Solar Bears	1–5	Florida Everblades	Amway Center	Recap
No scoring		First period	No scoring
No scoring		Second period	4:58 – Michael Kirkpatrick (2)
Justin Buzzeo (3) – 5:56		Third period	1:01 – Mike Marcou (1); 1:30 – Brendon O'Donnell (3); 8:55 – Brendon O'Donnell (4); 9:17 – Dalton Smith (1)
Mitch Gillam 42 shots / 37 saves		Goalie stats	Anthony Peters 33 shots / 32 saves

April 25	Florida Everblades	6–4	Orlando Solar Bears	Germain Arena	Recap
Levko Koper (1) – 5:30; Brant Harris (1) – 10:19; Brendan O'Donnell (5) – 14:42; John McCarron (1) – PP – 18:32		First period	13:34 – PP – Denver Manderson (4)
Matt Berry – 16:08		Second period	No scoring
Brant Harris (2) – EN – 17:13		Third period	1:33 – Milos Bubela (1); 17:53 – Daniel Maggio (1); 19:31 – Joe Perry (1)
Anthony Peters 39 shots / 35 saves		Goalie stats	Mitch Gillam 31 shots / 28 saves Kris Joyce 3 shots / 1 save

April 26	Florida Everblades	7–4	Orlando Solar Bears	Germain Arena	Recap
Brendan O'Donnell (6) – PP – 14:29; Stephen MacAulay (1) – 17:53		First period	14:50 – Milos Bubela (2)
Brant Harris (3) – 1:18; Dalton Smith (2) – 6:56		Second period	No scoring
Matt Berry (5) – PP – 0:28; Stephen MacAulay (2) – 4:54; Brendan O'Donnell (7) – 15:42		Third period	1:54 – Chris Crane (2); 17:39 – PP – Taylor Doherty (4); 18:50 – Denver Manderson (5)
Anthony Peters 27 shots / 23 saves		Goalie stats	Mitch Gillam 32 shots / 26 saves Kris Joyce 5 shots / 4 saves

Florida won series 4–3

==== (2) Greenville Swamp Rabbits vs. (3) South Carolina Stingrays ====
The two teams and the ECHL agreed on a 2-2-1-1-1 schedule due to the close proximity.

April 13	Greenville Swamp Rabbits	6–3	South Carolina Stingrays	Bon Secours Wellness Arena	Recap
Brandon Alderson (1) – 3:39; Tyler Brown (1) – 5:24		First period	16:43 – Patrick Gaul (1)
Ahti Oksanen (1) – 2:48; Brandon Alderson (2) – PP – 4:30; Allan McPherson (1) – 5:44		Second period	14:23 – Kelly Zajac (1); 16:11 – Rob Flick (1)
Allan McPherson (2) – 13:15		Third period	No scoring
Jeff Malcolm 37 shots / 34 saves		Goalie stats	Parker Milner 25 shots / 19 saves

April 14	Greenville Swamp Rabbits	4–1	South Carolina Stingrays	Bon Secours Wellness Arena	Recap
Tyler Brown (2) – 7:56; Brandon Alderson (3) – PP – 18:01		First period	No scoring
Ahti Oksanen (2) – 10:51; Tyler Brown (3) – 18:32		Second period	5:11 – PP – Joe Devin (1)
No scoring		Third period	No scoring
Jeff Malcolm 40 shots / 39 saves		Goalie stats	Parker Milner 31 shots / 27 saves

April 17	South Carolina Stingrays	6–0	Greenville Swamp Rabbits	North Charleston Coliseum	Recap
Oliver Archambault (1) – 11:05; Rob Flick (2) – 12:19		First period	No scoring
Joe Devin (2) – 4:46; Domenic Monardo (1) – PP – 11:26		Second period	No scoring
Andrew Cherniwchan (1) – 0:17; Rob Flick (3) – 19:22		Third period	No scoring
Parker Milner 25 shots / 25 saves		Goalie stats	Jeff Malcolm 44 shots / 38 saves

April 18	South Carolina Stingrays	6–1	Greenville Swamp Rabbits	North Charleston Coliseum	Recap
Patrick Gaul (2) – PP – 3:45; Wade Epp (1) – 6:47		First period	No scoring
Kelly Zajac (2) – PP – 17:18		Second period	No scoring
John Parker (1) – 1:31; Kelly Zajac (3) – 10:58; Rob Flick (4) – 18:02		Third period	7:37 – Joe Houk (1)
Parker Milner 37 shots / 36 saves		Goalie stats	Mackenzie Skapski 35 shots / 29 saves

April 21	Greenville Swamp Rabbits	2–4	South Carolina Stingrays	Bon Secours Wellness Arena	Recap
Matt Prapavessis (1) – 5:54		First period	No scoring
No scoring		Second period	3:14 – Domenic Monardo (2); 4:12 – Derek Arnold (1); 8:31 – PP – Rob Flick (5)
Tristan King (1) – SH – 13:12		Third period	14:33 – John Parker (2)
Jeff Malcolm 30 shots / 26 saves		Goalie stats	Parker Milner 24 shots / 22 saves

April 24	South Carolina Stingrays	4–0	Greenville Swamp Rabbits	North Charleston Coliseum	Recap
Derek Arnold (2) – PP – 12:20		First period	No scoring
John Parker (3) – SH – 14:15; Patrick Gaul (3) – 18:01		Second period	No scoring
Rob Flick (6) – EN – 19:02		Third period	No scoring
Parker Milner 26 shots / 26 saves		Goalie stats	Jeff Malcolm 31 shots / 28 saves

South Carolina won series 4–2

=== Central Division ===
==== (1) Toledo Walleye vs. (4) Kalamazoo Wings ====
The two teams and the ECHL agreed on a 2-2-1-1-1 schedule due to the close proximity.

April 14	Toledo Walleye	4–3	Kalamazoo Wings	Huntington Center	Recap
Kyle Bonis (1) –13:41; Evan Rankin (1) – 16:24; Tylor Spink (1) – 16:59		First period	3:33 – Blake Kessel (1)
Shane Berschbach (1) – 8:34		Second period	14:28 – Cameron Darcy (1)
No scoring		Third period	3:36 – Charlie Vasaturo (1)
Jake Paterson 30 shots / 27 saves		Goalie stats	Nick Riopel 22 shots / 18 saves

April 15	Toledo Walleye	4–1	Kalamazoo Wings	Huntington Center	Recap
Kyle Bonis (2) – 3:34; Tyson Spink (1) – 6:02; Evan Rankin (2) – PP – 8:11		First period	No scoring
Evan Rankin (3) – 9:51		Second period	No scoring
No scoring		Third period	17:43 – SH – Peter Schneider (1)
Jake Paterson 21 shots / 20 saves		Goalie stats	Joel Martin 34 shots / 30 saves

April 18	Kalamazoo Wings	6–4	Toledo Walleye	Wings Event Center	Recap
Justin Taylor (1) – 18:37		First period	6:45 – Kyle Bonis (4)
Peter Schneider (2) – PP – 5:52		Second period	0:49 – PP – Kyle Bonis (4); 13:21 – Evan Rankin (4)
Peter Schneider (3) – 5:36; Blake Kessel (2) – 6:21; Brian Hart (1) – 17:19; Peter Schneider (4) – EN – 19:38		Third period	8:22 – Dane Walters (1)
Nick Riopel 21 shots / 17 saves		Goalie stats	Jake Paterson 52 shots / 47 saves

April 19	Kalamazoo Wings	8–5	Toledo Walleye	Wings Event Center	Recap
Josh Pitt (1) – PP – 6:16; Brian Hart (2) – 8:08; Cameron Darcy (2) – 12:46; Scott Henegar (1) – 13:02		First period	10:04 – PP – Tyson Spink (2)
Peter Schneider (5) – PP – 4:25; Eric Kattelus (1) – 19:31		Second period	16:01 – Alex Globke (1)
Josh Pitt (2) – 14:02; Josh Pitt (3) – EN – 18:37		Third period	1:11 – PP – Kyle Bonis (5); 7:00 – PP – Tylor Spink (2); 11:02 – Landon Oslanski (1)
Nick Riopel 36 shots / 31 saves		Goalie stats	Jake Paterson 11 shots / 7 saves Jeff Lerg 19 shots / 16 saves

April 21	Toledo Walleye	3–2	Kalamazoo Wings	Huntington Center	Recap
No scoring		First period	16:33 – PP – Cameron Darcy (3)
Zach Nastasiuk (1) – 10:14; Tyson Spink (3) – 19:25		Second period	16:19 – Brian Hart (3)
A.J. Jenks (1) – 19:37		Third period	No scoring
Jake Paterson 24 shots / 22 saves		Goalie stats	Nick Riopel 27 shots / 24 saves

April 23	Kalamazoo Wings	4–3	Toledo Walleye	Wings Event Center	Recap
Blake Kessel (3) – 15:31		First period	3:04 – Landon Oslanski (2); 6:06 – Zach Nastasiuk (2)
Lane Scheidl (1) – 3:58; Brian Hart (4) – 13:41; Josh Pitt (4) – 18:18		Second period	No scoring
No scoring		Third period	15:23 – PP – Tyson Spink (4)
Joel Martin 31 shots / 28 saves		Goalie stats	Jake Paterson 26 shots / 22 saves

April 25	Toledo Walleye	3–1	Kalamazoo Wings	Huntington Center	Recap
No scoring		First period	No scoring
Kyle Bonis – 16:11		Second period	17:03 – Charlie Vasaturo (2)
Evan Rankin (5) – 8:29; Zach Nastasiuk (3) – 9:06		Third period	No scoring
Jake Paterson 15 shots / 15 saves Jeff Lerg 14 shots / 13 saves		Goalie stats	Joel Martin 31 shots / 28 saves

Toledo won series 4–3

==== (2) Fort Wayne Komets vs. (3) Quad City Mallards ====
April 14	Fort Wayne Komets	4–3	Quad City Mallards	Allen County War Memorial Coliseum	Recap
Mike Cazzola (1) – 19:43		First period	10:48 – Alex Petan (1); 16:50 – Grant Arnold (1)
Travis Ewanyk (1) – 13:22; Shawn Szydlowski (1) – PP – 15:25		Second period	2:35 – Dylan Labbe (1)
Gabriel Desjardins (1) – 12:57		Third period	No scoring
Pat Nagle 13 shots / 10 saves		Goalie stats	C. J. Motte 37 shots / 33 saves

April 15	Fort Wayne Komets	3–1	Quad City Mallards	Allen County War Memorial Coliseum	Recap
Mike Cazzola (2) – 8:01; Mike Embach (1) – 17:03		First period	19:24 – PP – Jack Nevins (1)
Jamie Schaafsma (1) – PP – 15:22		Second period	No scoring
No scoring		Third period	No scoring
Pat Nagle 18 shots / 17 saves		Goalie stats	C. J. Motte 37 shots / 34 saves

April 19	Quad City Mallards	3–4	OT	Fort Wayne Komets	iWireless Center	Recap
Michael Parks (1) – 1:27		First period		9:56 – Mike Cazzola (3)
Sam Warning (1) – 14:20		Second period		3:14 – Gabriel Desjardins (2); 17:16 – Kyle Thomas (1)
Alex Petan (2) – 12:44		Third period		No scoring
No scoring		First overtime period		0:22 – PP – Kyle Thomas (2)
C. J. Motte 35 shots / 31 saves		Goalie stats		Pat Nagle 36 shots / 33 saves

April 21	Quad City Mallards	3–2	OT	Fort Wayne Komets	iWireless Center	Recap
Josh MacDonald (1) – 0:31		First period		No scoring
Mike Wilson (1) – 1:12		Second period		4:46 – Jason Binkley (1); 9:29 – PP – Jamie Schaafsma (2)
No scoring		Third period		No scoring
Sam Warning (2) – 19:44		First overtime period		No scoring
C. J. Motte 38 shots / 36 saves		Goalie stats		Pat Nagle 39 shots / 36 saves

April 22	Quad City Mallards	2–3	Fort Wayne Komets	iWireless Center	Recap
No scoring		First period	6:33 – Trevor Cheek (1); 17:10 – PP – Jamie Schaafsma (3)
Grant Arnold (2) – PP – 19:54		Second period	12:14 – PP – Kyle Thomas (3)
Chris Francis (1) – 1:46		Third period	No scoring
C. J. Motte 34 shtos / 31 saves		Goalie stats	Pat Nagle 31 shots / 29 saves

Fort Wayne won series 4–1

=== Mountain Division ===
==== (1) Allen American vs. (4) Utah Grizzlies ====
April 12	Allen Americans	4–3	Utah Grizzlies	Allen Event Center	Recap
Bryan Moore (1) – 2:00		First period	8:33 – Erik Higby (1); 9:09 – Erik Higby (2)
Tyler Barnes (1) – 7:44		Second period	7:17 – C.J. Eick (1)
Wade MacLeod (1) – 7:28; Joel Chouinard (1) – PP – 16:37		Third period	No scoring
Riley Gill 8 shots / 6 saves Jamie Murray 16 shots / 15 saves		Goalie stats	Kevin Boyle 25 shots / 21 saves

April 14	Allen Americans	1–4	Utah Grizzlies	Allen Event Center	Recap
No scoring		First period	17:17 – Austen Brassard (1)
No scoring		Second period	7:28 – C.J. Eick (2); 17:54 – Jon Puskar (1); 19:29 – PP – Michael Pelech (1)
Josh Brittain (1) – 8:49		Third period	No scoring
Riley Gill 30 shots / 26 saves		Goalie stats	Kevin Boyle 37 shots / 36 saves

April 19	Utah Grizzlies	2–4	Allen Americans	Maverik Center	Recap
No scoring		First period	17:41 – PP – Bryan Moore (2)
Austen Brassard (2) – 4:07; Tim Daly (1) – PP – 17:31		Second period	No scoring
No scoring		Third period	2:53 – Zach Hall (1); 9:17 – PP – Greger Hanson (1); 19:54 – EN/SH – Spencer Asuchak (1)
Kevin Boyle 31 shots / 28 saves		Goalie stats	Riley Gill 27 shots / 25 saves

April 21	Utah Grizzlies	1–5	Allen Americans	Maverik Center	Recap
Cam Reid (1) – 15:24		First period	No scoring
No scoring		Second period	No scoring
No scoring		Third period	2:55 – PP – David Makowski (1); 6:16 – PP – Eric Roy (1); 9:01 – Greger Hanson (2); 12:57 – Wade MacLeod (2); 18:52 – EN – Alex Krushelnyski (1)
Kevin Boyle 34 shots / 30 saves		Goalie stats	Riley Gill 30 shots / 29 saves

April 22	Utah Grizzlies	0–4	Allen Americans	Maverik Center	Recap
No scoring		First period	3:39 – Travis Brown (1); 19:56 – Joel Chouinard (2)
No scoring		Second period	No scoring
No scoring		Third period	6:42 – Wade MacLeod (3); 12:42 – PP – Joel Chouinard (3)
Kevin Boyle 33 shots / 29 saves		Goalie stats	Riley Gill 30 shots / 30 saves

Allen won series 4–1

==== (2) Colorado Eagles vs. (3) Idaho Steelheads ====
April 14	Colorado Eagles	2–4	Idaho Steelheads	Budweiser Events Center	Recap
Johnny Lazo (1) – 9:38		First period	8:27 – PP – Jefferson Dahl (1)
Sean Zimmerman (1) – 15:18		Second period	7:19 – SH – Rob Linsmayer (1); 13:55 – Justin Hache (1)
No scoring		Third period	19:36 – EN – Brian Nugent (1)
Kent Simpson 21 shots / 18 saves		Goalie stats	Landon Bow 34 shots / 32 saves

April 15	Colorado Eagles	2–1	OT	Idaho Steelheads	Budweiser Events Center	Recap
No scoring		First period		No scoring
No scoring		Second period		19:42 – Rob Linsmayer (2)
Alex Belzile (1) – PP – 14:17		Third period		No scoring
Matt Register (1) – 1:05		First overtime period		No scoring
Lukas Hafner 25 shots / 24 saves		Goalie stats		Landon Bow 19 shots / 17 saves

April 19	Idaho Steelheads	2–4	Colorado Eagles	CenturyLink Arena	Recap
Jefferson Dahl (2) – PP – 13:33		First period	10:55 – Shawn St-Amant (1); 19:19 – SH – Casey Pierro-Zabotel (1)
Kellan Lain (1) – PP – 5:05		Second period	1:55 – Julien Nantel (1); 19:59– PP – Alex Belzile (2)
No scoring		Third period	No scoring
Landon Bow 40 shots / 36 saves		Goalie stats	Lukas Hafner 21 shots / 19 saves

April 21	Idaho Steelheads	5–6	OT	Colorado Eagles	CenturyLink Arena	Recap
Anthony Luciani (1) – 14:13		First period		No scoring
Aaron Harstad (1) – PP – 0:31; Aaron Harstad (2) – 4:21; Anthony Luciani (2) – 5:33; Andre Bouvet-Morrissette (1) – 15:33		Second period		9:43 – PP – Matt Register (2); 14:14 – Matt Garbowsky (1)
No scoring		Third period		17:32 – Julien Nantel (2); 18:01 – Alex Belzile (3); 19:51 – Matt Register (3)
No scoring		First overtime period		0:41 – Alex Belzile (4)
Landon Bow 30 shots / 24 saves		Goalie stats		Lukas Hafner 24 shots / 19 saves

April 22	Idaho Steelheads	3–6	Colorado Eagles	CenturyLink Arena	Recap
Travis Walsh (1) – PP – 19:01		First period	1:42 – Julien Nantel (3); 6:00 – PP – Luke Salazar (1); 11:17 – Cam Maclise (1)
Joe Basaraba (1) – 10:55; Kyle Jean (1) – 13:53		Second period	7:32 – Cam Maclise (2); 14:45 – PP – Alex Belzile (5)
No scoring		Third period	18:07 – EN – Ryan Harrison (1)
Branden Komm 24 shots / 19 saves		Goalie stats	Lukas Hafner 37 shots / 34 saves

Colorado won series 4–1

== Division finals ==
Home team is listed first.

=== North Division ===
==== (3) Brampton Beast vs. (4) Manchester Monarchs ====
April 27	Brampton Beast	3–2	OT	Manchester Monarchs	Powerade Centre	Recap
No scoring		First period		17:57 – Zac Lynch (3)
Brandon MacLean (4) – 2:23		Second period		2:02 – Zac Lynch (4)
Connor Crisp (2) – 1:26		Third period		No scoring
Connor Crisp (3) – 1:27		First overtime period		No scoring
Zachary Fucale 47 shots / 45 saves		Goalie stats		Sam Brittain 34 shots / 31 saves

April 29	Brampton Beast	1–3	Manchester Monarchs	Powerade Centre	Recap
Jordan Henry (3) – PP – 13:24		First period	No scoring
No scoring		Second period	6:22 – Daniel Ciampini (1); 11:01 – Quentin Shore (3)
No scoring		Third period	19:30 – EN – Craig Wyszyomirski (1)
Zachary Fucale 33 shots / 31 saves		Goalie stats	Sam Brittain 24 shots / 23 saves

May 1	Manchester Monarchs	4–0	Brampton Beast	SNHU Arena	Recap
Quentin Shore (4) – 10:39; Daniel Doremus (2) – 13:17; Matt Leitner (4) – PP – 13:58		First period	No scoring
Daniel Ciampini (2) – 17:46		Second period	No scoring
No scoring		Third period	No scoring
Sam Brittain 25 shots / 25 saves		Goalie stats	Zachary Fucale 30 shots / 26 saves

May 2	Manchester Monarchs	6–1	Brampton Beast	SNHU Arena	Recap
Matt Leitner (5) – PP – 11:40; Daniel Doremus (3) – PP – 16:40		First period	No scoring
Kevin Morris (2) – PP – 15:49		Second period	No scoring
Ashton Rome (3) – 10:17; Tyler Sikura (3) – EN/SH – 14:29; Ashton Rome (4) – EN – 19:16		Third period	7:32 – Luc-Olivier Blain (1)
Sam Brittain 27 shots / 26 saves		Goalie stats	Zachary Fucale 30 shots / 26 saves

May 3	Manchester Monarchs	1–2	Brampton Beast	SNHU Arena	Recap
No scoring		First period	9:38 – PP – David Ling (1)
Daniel Doremus (4) – PP – 15:21		Second period	No scoring
No scoring		Third period	9:35 – PP – Reggie Traccitto (1)
Sam Brittain 42 shots / 40 saves		Goalie stats	Zachary Fucale 27 shots / 26 saves

May 5	Brampton Beast	4–5	Manchester Monarchs	Powerade Centre	Recap
David Pacan (1) – 6:05; Reggie Traccitto (2) – 19:52		First period	14:35 – Ashton Rome (5)
Luke Pither (2) – 18:33		Second period	4:30 – Kevin Morris (3)
David Pacan (2) – PP – 11:11		Third period	0:23 – Ashton Rome (6); 5:03 – Zac Lynch (5); 15:38 – Matt Leitner (6)
Zachary Fucale 26 shots / 21 saves		Goalie stats	Sam Brittain 33 shots / 29 saves

Manchester won series 4–2

=== South Division ===
==== (1) Florida Everblades vs. (3) South Carolina Stingrays ====
April 28	Florida Everblades	2–3	2OT	South Carolina Stingrays	Germain Arena	Recap
Brant Harris (4) – 3:23; Michael Kirkpatrick (3) – 7:30		First period		No scoring
No scoring		Second period		4:41 – PP – Steven McParland (1); 16:31 – Domenic Monardo (3)
No scoring		Third period		No scoring
No scoring		Second overtime period		19:05 – Domenic Monardo (4)
Anthony Peters 29 shots / 26 saves		Goalie stats		Parker Milner 36 shots / 34 saves

April 29	Florida Everblades	5–2	South Carolina Stingrays	Germain Arena	Recap
Matt Hatch (1) – 2:28; Levko Koper (2) – PP – 2:53; Levko Koper (3) – 5:45		First period	17:19 – PP – Andrew Cherniwchan (2)
No scoring		Second period	6:57 – Andrew Cherniwchan (3)
Brendan O'Donnell (8) – PP – 3:06; Levko Koper (4) – EN – 18:46		Third period	No scoring
Alex Nedeljkovic 23 shots / 21 saves		Goalie stats	Parker Milner 22 shots / 18 saves

May 1	South Carolina Stingrays	1–0	2OT	Florida Everblades	North Charleston Coliseum	Recap
No scoring		First period		No scoring
No scoring		Second period		No scoring
No scoring		Third period		No scoring
Andrew Cheriwchan (4) – 2:39		Second overtime period		No scoring
Parker Milner 38 shots / 38 saves		Goalie stats		Alex Nedeljkovic 38 shots / 37 saves

May 3	South Carolina Stingrays	4–2	Florida Everblades	North Charleston Coliseum	Recap
No scoring		First period	No scoring
Steven McParland (2) – 1:36; Domenic Monardo (5) – PS – 3:02; Rob Flick (7) – 6:47		Second period	12:38 – John McCarron (2); 16:39 – Dalton Smith (3)
Kelly Zajac (4) – EN/SH – 19:42		Third period	No scoring
Parker Milner 30 shots / 28 saves		Goalie stats	Anthony Peters 12 shots / 9 saves Alex Nedeljkovic 12 shots / 12 saves

May 4	South Carolina Stingrays	2–1	Florida Everblades	North Charleston Coliseum	Recap
Andrew Cherniwchan (5) – 13:56; Olivier Archambault (2) – 14:50		First period	No scoring
No scoring		Second period	No scoring
No scoring		Third period	4:33 – John McCarron (3)
Parker Milner 29 shots / 28 saves		Goalie stats	Alex Nedeljkovic 29 shots / 27 saves

South Carolina won series 4–1

=== Central Division ===
==== (1) Toledo Walleye vs. (2) Fort Wayne Komets ====
April 28	Toledo Walleye	2–1	Fort Wayne Komets	Huntington Center	Recap
No scoring		First period	No scoring
Landon Oslanski (3) – PP – 2:27; A. J. Jenks (2) – PP – 13:42		Second period	9:51 – Trevor Cheek (2)
No scoring		Third period	No scoring
Jeff Lerg 25 shots / 24 saves		Goalie stats	Pat Nagle 24 shots / 22 saves

April 29	Toledo Walleye	4–3	OT	Fort Wayne Komets	Huntington Center	Recap
Tyson Spink (5) – 0:22		First period		No scoring
Kyle Bonis (7) – 19:15		Second period		8:40 – Gabriel Desjardins (3)
Dane Walters (2) – 13:35		Third period		4:07 – Kyle Thomas (4); 19:40 – Cody Sol (1)
Dane Walters (3) – PP – 1:00		First overtime period		No scoring
Jeff Lerg 41 shots / 38 saves		Goalie stats		Pat Nagle 30 shots / 26 saves

May 3	Fort Wayne Komets	2–3	Toledo Walleye	Allen County War Memorial Coliseum	Recap
No scoring		First period	No scoring
Garrett Thompson (1) – 0:29; Gabriel Desjardins (3) – SH – 16:40		Second period	9:14 – A. J. Jenks (3)
No scoring		Third period	4:11 – Evan Rankin (6); 16:55 – A. J. Jenks (4)
Garrett Bartus 35 shots / 32 saves		Goalie stats	Jeff Lerg 35 shots / 33 saves

May 5	Fort Wayne Komets	4–1	Toledo Walleye	Allen County War Memorial Coliseum	Recap
Jamie Schaafsma (4) -3:13; Gabriel Desjardins (3) – 15:08		First period	18:25 – Evan Rankin (7)
No scoring		Second period	No scoring
Shawn Szydlowski (2) - 10:02; Jamie Schaafsma (4) -16:43		Third period	No scoring
Pat Nagle 35 shots / 34 saves		Goalie stats	Jeff Lerg 32 shots / 28 saves

May 6	Toledo Walleye	5–0	Fort Wayne Komets	Huntington Center	Recap
Simon Denis (1) – PP – 5:20; Tylor Spink (3) – PP – 17:58		First period	No scoring
A. J. Jenks (5) – 10:10		Second period	No scoring
Tyson Spink (6) – 6:44; Simon Denis (2) – 12:08		Third period	No scoring
Jeff Lerg 24 shots / 24 saves		Goalie stats	Pat Nagle 28 shots / 23 saves

Toledo won series 4–1

=== Mountain Division ===
==== (1) Allen Americans vs. (2) Colorado Eagles ====
April 28	Allen Americans	1–4	Colorado Eagles	Allen Event Center	Recap
Greger Hanson (3) – PP – 8:18		First period	3:30 – PP – Cam Maclise (3); 9:24 – Alex Belzile (6)
No scoring		Second period	8:19 – Jake Marto (1); 19:07 – Jake Marto (2)
No scoring		Third period	No scoring
Riley Gill 31 shots / 27 saves		Goalie stats	Lukas Hafner 25 shots / 24 saves

April 29	Allen Americans	2–5	Colorado Eagles	Allen Event Center	Recap
No scoring		First period	4:46 – Johnny Lazo (2)
No scoring		Second period	9:51 – Alex Belzile (7); 14:27 – PP – Matt Register (4)
Gary Steffes (1) – 2:23; Josh Brittain (2) – 16:18		Third period	18:01 – Alex Belzile (8); 19:05 – EN – Ryan Harrison (2)
Riley Gill 33 shots / 29 saves		Goalie stats	Lukas Hafner 31 shots / 29 saves

May 3	Colorado Eagles	4–2	Allen Americans	Budweiser Events Center	Recap
Jake Marto (3) – PP – 10:00		First period	19:22 – PP – David Makowski (2)
Alex Belzile (9) – 2:38		Second period	No scoring
Luke Salazar (2) – 12:59; Alex Belzile (10) – EN – 19:02		Third period	0:20 – PP – Chad Costello (1)
Lukas Hafner 27 shots / 25 saves		Goalie stats	Riley Gill 29 shots / 26 saves

May 4	Colorado Eagles	1–4	Allen Americans	Budweiser Events Center	Recap
Julien Nantel (4) – 3:28		First period	No scoring
No scoring		Second period	8:11 – PP – Chad Costello (2); 18:57 – SH – Tyler Barnes (2)
No scoring		Third period	9:33 – Alex Krushelnyski (2); 12:22 – Josh Brittain (3)
Lukas Hafner 25 shots / 21 saves		Goalie stats	Riley Gill 18 shots / 17 saves

May 7	Colorado Eagles	0–4	Allen Americans	Budweiser Events Center	Recap
No scoring		First period	2:27 – PP – Chad Costello (3)
No scoring		Second period	No scoring
No scoring		Third period	2:33 – Tyler Barnes (3); 3:31 – Gary Steffes (2); 16:39 – EN/SH – Spencer Asuchak (2)
Lukas Hafner 24 shots / 21 saves		Goalie stats	Riley Gill 35 shots / 35 saves

May 9	Allen Americans	3–4	Colorado Eagles	Allen Event Center	Recap
Travis Brown (2) – 2:11		First period	1:34 – Johnny Lazo (3)
Gary Steffes (3) – 11:46; Bryan Moore (3) – 16:32		Second period	8:29 – Shawn St-Amant (2)
No scoring		Third period	0:35 – Mason Geertsen (1); 18:51 – Matt Register (5)
Riley Gill 29 shots / 25 saves		Goalie stats	Kent Simpson 26 shots / 23 saves

Colorado won series 4–2

== Conference finals ==
Home team is listed first.

=== Eastern Conference ===
==== (N4) Manchester Monarchs vs. (S3) South Carolina Stingrays ====
May 12	South Carolina Stingrays	1–2	Manchester Monarchs	North Charleston Coliseum	Recap
No scoring		First period	No scoring
No scoring		Second period	7:21 – Kevin Morris (4); 9:19 – PP – Alexx Privitera (1)
Max Nicastro (1) – PP – 6:24		Third period	No scoring
Parker Milner 27 shots / 25 saves		Goalie stats	Sam Brittain 22 shots / 21 saves

May 13	South Carolina Stingrays	3–4	Manchester Monarchs	North Charleston Coliseum	Recap
No scoring		First period	7:35 – Zac Lynch (6); 11:00 – Quentin Shore (5)
Marcus Perrier (1) – 14:34		Second period	8:54 – Craig Wyszomirski (2)
Rob Flick (8) – 4:13; Joe Devin (3) – PP – 8:15		Third period	1:06 – PP – Kevin Morris (5)
Parker Milner 25 shots / 21 saves		Goalie stats	Sam Brittain 47 shots / 44 saves

May 15	South Carolina Stingrays	5–3	Manchester Monarchs	North Charleston Coliseum	Recap
No scoring		First period	10:23 – PP – Zac Lynch (7)
Cody Corbett (1) – 0:44; Joey Leach (1) – 8:00		Second period	5:21 – Ashton Rome (7)
Olivier Archambault (3) – SH – 4:11; Steven McParland (3) – 5:52; Rob Flick (9) – 14:02		Third period	1:29 – PP – Daniel Ciampini (3)
Parker Milner 26 shots / 23 saves		Goalie stats	Sam Brittain 32 shots / 27 saves

May 19	Manchester Monarchs	1–2	South Carolina Stingrays	SNHU Arena	Recap
No scoring		First period	No scoring
No scoring		Second period	11:20 – Andrew Cherniwchan (6)
Quentin Shore (6) – 13:59		Third period	1:29 – Rob Flick (10)
Sam Brittain 23 shots / 21 saves		Goalie stats	Parker Milner 34 shots / 33 saves

May 20	Manchester Monarchs	1–3	South Carolina Stingrays	SNHU Arena	Recap
Matt Leitner (7) – PP – 11:16		First period	No scoring
No scoring		Second period	No scoring
No scoring		Third period	4:19 – Steven McParland (4); 6:37 – PP – Olivier Archambault (4); 16:37 – Kelly Zajac (5)
Sam Brittain 29 shots / 26 saves		Goalie stats	Parker Milner 20 shots / 19 saves

May 22	Manchester Monarchs	5–1	South Carolina Stingrays	SNHU Arena	Recap
Tyler Sikura (4) – PP – 15:51		First period	No scoring
Matt Leitner (8) – 16:28		Second period	No scoring
Ashton Rome (8) – 8:51; Tyler Sikura (5) – 15:53; Daniel Ciampini (4) – 16:56		Third period	18:39 – PP – Olivier Archambault (5)
Sam Brittain 39 shots / 38 saves		Goalie stats	Parker Milner 32 shots / 27 saves Adam Carlson 2 shots / 2 saves

May 24	Manchester Monarchs	3–4	South Carolina Stingrays	SNHU Arena	Recap
Zac Lynch (8) – 4:18; Colton Saucerman (2) – PP – 14:20		First period	7:21 – Rob Flick (11)
No scoring		Second period	14:31 – Domenic Monardo (6); 15:41 – Olivier Archambault (6)
Ashton Rome (9) – 3:17		Third period	8:56 – Olivier Archambault (7)
Sam Brittain 30 shots / 26 saves		Goalie stats	Parker Milner 27 shots / 24 saves

South Carolina won series 4–3

=== Western Conference ===
==== (C1) Toledo Walleye vs. (M2) Colorado Eagles ====
May 12	Toledo Walleye	4–2	Colorado Eagles	Huntington Center	Recap
Alden Hirschfeld (1) – 19:40		First period	18:03 – Darryl Bootland (1)
Dane Walters (4) – PP – 0:29; A. J. Jenks (6) – 1:23		Second period	17:32 – Alex Belzile (11)
Shane Berschbach (2) – EN – 19:07		Third period	No scoring
Jeff Lerg 32 shots / 30 saves		Goalie stats	Kent Simpson 27 shots / 24 saves

May 13	Toledo Walleye	3–4	Colorado Eagles	Huntington Center	Recap
Evan Rankin (8) – 3:06		First period	5:37 – Jake Marto (4); 7:55 – Julien Nantel (5); 8:50 – PP – Alex Belzile (12)
Kyle Bonis (8) – 9:02		Second period	No scoring
Kyle Bonis (9) – PP – 10:55		Third period	1:44 – PP – Matt Register (6)
Jeff Lerg 22 shots / 18 saves		Goalie stats	Lukas Hafner 29 shots / 26 saves

May 17	Colorado Eagles	4–3	OT	Toledo Walleye	Budweiser Events Center	Recap
Shawn St-Amant (3) – 0:14; Alex Belzile (13)		First period		11:08 – Kyle Bonis (10); 14:36 – Tylor Spink
No scoring		Second period		No scoring
Sergei Boikov (1) – 3:31		Third period		12:00 – PP – Matt Caito (1)
Julien Nantel (6) – 1:20		First overtime period		No scoring
Lukas Hafner 12 shots / 9 saves		Goalie stats		Jeff Lerg 31 shots / 27 saves

May 19	Colorado Eagles	5–4	3OT	Toledo Walleye	Budweiser Events Center	Recap
Segei Boikov (2) – 6:41; Luke Salazar (3) – 16:29		First period		3:07 – Tylor Spink (5); 13:27 – A. J. Jenks (7)
Ryan Harrison (3) – SH – 2:33		Second period		2:57 – A. J. Jenks (8)
Casey Pierro-Zabotel (2) – PP – 17:51		Third period		7:27 – Zach Nastasiuk (4)
Matt Garbowsky (2) – 3:07		Third overtime period		No scoring
Lukas Hafner 36 shots / 32 saves		Goalie stats		Jake Patterson 44 shots / 39 saves

May 20	Colorado Eagles	6–3	Toledo Walleye	Budweiser Events Center	Recap
Casey Pierro-Zabotel (3) – PP – 12:06		First period	6:16 – Tyson Spink; 16:37 – Beau Schmitz (1)
Alex Belzile (14) – PP – 10:47; Cam Maclise (4) – 16:09		Second period	8:01 – Dane Walters (5)
Julien Nantel (7) – 1:29; Cam Maclise (5) – 4:05; Shawn St-Amant (4) – EN – 19:16		Third period	No scoring
Kent Simpson 25 shots / 22 saves		Goalie stats	Jake Patterson 36 shots / 31 saves

Colorado won series 4–1

== Kelly Cup finals ==
Home team is listed first.

=== (Mountain #2) Colorado Eagles vs. (South #3) South Carolina Stingrays ===
May 26	Colorado Eagles	3–2	2OT	South Carolina Stingrays	Budweiser Events Center	Recap
Matt Garbowsky (3) – 16:11		First period		No scoring
No scoring		Second period		10:14 – Scott Tanski (1)
Matt Garbowsky (4) – 19:58		Third period		17:27 – Steven McParland (5)
Matt Register (7) – PP – 10:52		Second overtime period		No scoring
Lukas Hafner 34 shots / 32 saves		Goalie stats		Parker Milner 46 shots / 43 saves

May 28	Colorado Eagles	3–2	South Carolina Stingrays	Budweiser Events Center	Recap
No scoring		First period	4:00 – Steven McParland (6)
Matt Garbowsky (5) – PP – 3:34; Sean Zimmerman (2) – 4:37		Second period	19:09 – PP – Steve Weinstein (1)
Shawn St-Amant (5) – PP – 10:09		Third period	No scoring
Lukas Hafner 27 shots / 25 saves		Goalie stats	Parker Milner 29 shots / 26 saves

June 4	South Carolina Stingrays	4–5	OT	Colorado Eagles	North Charleston Coliseum	Recap
Kelly Zajac (6) –PP – 7:06		First period		14:51 – Julien Nantel (8)
Andrew Cherniwchan (7) – 1:08; Steven McParland (7) – 15:38		Second period		12:09 – Sergei Boikov (3)
Joe Devin (4) – PP – 16:19		Third period		10:09 – Jake Marto; 19:35 – PP – Matt Register (8)
No scoring		First overtime period		6:04 – Matt Garbowsky (6)
Parker Milner 32 shots / 27 saves		Goalie stats		Lukas Hafner 30 shots / 26 saves

June 5	South Carolina Stingrays	1–2	Colorado Eagles	North Charleston Coliseum	Recap

Colorado won series 4–0

== Statistical leaders ==
=== Skaters ===
These are the top ten skaters based on points.

Player	Team	GP	G	A	Pts	+/–	PIM
Alex Belzile	Colorado Eagles	18	14	12	26	+12	38
Matt Register	Colorado Eagles	20	8	16	23	+9	18
Rob Flick	South Carolina Stingrays	22	11	11	22	+5	51
Matt Leitner	Manchester Monarchs	19	8	14	22	+13	12
Kyle Bonis	Toledo Walleye	17	10	8	18	-2	2
Tyson Spink	Toledo Walleye	17	7	11	18	0	12
Domenic Monardo	South Carolina Stingrays	22	6	12	18	+7	41
Jake Marto	Colorado Eagles	20	5	13	18	+7	6
Olivier Archambault	South Carolina Stingrays	22	7	10	17	+2	28
Kelly Zajac	South Carolina Stingrays	22	6	11	17	0	2

GP = Games played; G = Goals; A = Assists; Pts = Points; +/– = Plus/minus; PIM = Penalty minutes

=== Goaltending ===
This is a combined table of the top five goaltenders based on goals against average and the top five goaltenders based on save percentage, with at least 240 minutes played. The table is sorted by GAA, and the criteria for inclusion are bolded.

Player	Team	GP	W	L	OTL	SA	GA	GAA	SV%	SO	TOI
Mark Dekanich	Reading Royals	6	2	2	2	239	11	**1.62**	**0.954**	0	406
Alex Nedeljkovic	Florida Everblades	7	1	4	1	186	13	**1.92**	**0.930**	0	406
Zachary Fucale	Brampton Beast	11	6	5	0	365	25	**2.13**	**0.932**	0	704
Ryan Massa	Orlando Solar Bears	4	3	0	1	153	9	**2.14**	**0.941**	0	252
Parker Milner	South Carolina Stingrays	22	12	8	2	665	54	**2.30**	0.919	3	1409
Sam Brittain	Manchester Monarchs	19	11	7	1	584	44	2.33	**0.925**	1	1132

GP = Games played; W = Wins; L = Losses; OTL = Overtime Losses; SA = Shots against; GA = Goals against; GAA = Goals against average; SV% = Save percentage; SO = Shutouts; TOI = Time on ice (in minutes)

== See also ==
- 2016–17 ECHL season
- List of ECHL seasons

Preceded by 2016 Kelly Cup playoffs	Kelly Cup Playoffs; 2017	Succeeded by 2018 Kelly Cup playoffs
