= Sergei Boikov =

Russian ice hockey player (born 1996)

- Born: January 24, 1996 (age 30) Khabarovsk, Russia
- Height: 6 ft 2 in (188 cm)
- Weight: 201 lb (91 kg; 14 st 5 lb)
- Position: Defence
- Shoots: Left
- KHL team Former teams: Shanghai Dragons; San Antonio Rampage; Colorado Eagles; Dynamo Moscow; Avangard Omsk; Torpedo Nizhny Novgorod
- NHL draft: 161st overall, 2015; Colorado Avalanche
- Playing career: 2016–present

Sergei Boikov (born January 24, 1996) is a Russian professional ice hockey defenceman currently playing with Shanghai Dragons of the Kontinental Hockey League (KHL). He was drafted 161st overall by the Colorado Avalanche in the 6th round of the 2015 NHL entry draft.

== Playing career ==
Boikov played junior hockey in Russia with Kuznetskie Medvedi of the MHL during the 2012–13 season. He was selected 88th overall in the third round of the 2013 KHL Junior Draft by Metallurg Novokuznetsk.

Seeking to pursue an NHL career, Boikov moved to North America after being selected 90th overall by the Drummondville Voltigeurs in the second round of the 2013 CHL Import Draft. He spent three seasons with the Voltigeurs of the QMJHL. Following a first-round exit in the 2015–16 playoffs, Boikov concluded his junior career by initially signing an amateur try-out contract with the Avalanche's AHL affiliate, the San Antonio Rampage, on April 6, 2016. He appeared in four regular season games with the Rampage to finish the season.

Despite his KHL rights being traded by Novokuznetsk to Salavat Yulaev Ufa, Boikov chose to remain in North America after securing a three-year, entry-level contract with the Colorado Avalanche on May 27, 2016. After attending the 2016 Avalanche training camp, he was reassigned to the Rampage to begin his first full professional season in the 2016–17. On November 3, 2016, he was assigned to the ECHL affiliate, the Colorado Eagles, where he scored his first professional goal in 7 games before returning to San Antonio on November 22, 2016. Boikov solidified his role on the blueline throughout the season and, as the Rampage missed the playoffs, finished with 16 points in 63 games. He was reassigned to the Eagles for their playoff run, contributing 10 points in 18 games to help the club win their first Kelly Cup.

At the conclusion of his entry-level contract, Boikov received a qualifying offer for his NHL rights to remain with the Avalanche. Unable to make his way into the NHL, Boikov opted to return to Russia, signing a two-year contract with HC Dynamo Moscow of the KHL on July 15, 2019.

After a transitional first season adapting to the larger ice, Boikov saw an increased role in the following 2020–21, establishing a career high with 38 appearances from the blueline and posting four assists. On April 16, 2021, Boikov signed a two-year contract extension to remain with Dynamo Moscow.

Following the completion of the 2022–23, having played four seasons with Dynamo, Boikov was announced to be leaving the club on June 29, 2023.

With his rights still retained by Dynamo and the 2023–24 underway, Boikov was traded to Avangard Omsk in exchange for financial compensation and immediately signed a two-year contract on September 22, 2023.

After two seasons with Avangard, Boikov left the club as a free agent and was signed to a one-year contract with Torpedo Nizhny Novgorod on 9 June 2025.

Boikov played a lone season with Torpedo before leaving at the conclusion of his contract to join Chinese KHL outfit, Shanghai Dragons, on 19 June 2026.

== International play ==
Medal record

Representing Russia

Ice hockey

World Junior Championships
Silver medal – second place	2016 Finland	

Boikov first made his international debut for the Russia at the junior level in the 2013. In the midst of his final junior season in the QMJHL, Boikov returned to the junior setup, featuring in the 2016 World Junior Championships. He took home a silver medal after the team's overtime loss to host's Finland in the championship game.

== Career statistics ==
=== Regular season and playoffs ===
			Regular season					Playoffs
Season	Team	League	GP	G	A	Pts	PIM	GP	G	A	Pts	PIM
2012–13	Kuznetskie Medvedi	MHL	3	0	0	0	6	—	—	—	—	—
2013–14	Drummondville Voltigeurs	QMJHL	68	2	10	12	89	11	0	1	1	8
2014–15	Drummondville Voltigeurs	QMJHL	64	3	18	21	64	—	—	—	—	—
2015–16	Drummondville Voltigeurs	QMJHL	52	6	20	26	73	4	0	0	0	0
2015–16	San Antonio Rampage	AHL	4	0	0	0	0	—	—	—	—	—
2016–17	San Antonio Rampage	AHL	63	3	13	16	69	—	—	—	—	—
2016–17	Colorado Eagles	ECHL	7	1	1	2	2	18	3	7	10	12
2018–19	Colorado Eagles	AHL	56	1	10	11	74	4	0	0	0	4
2018–19	Utah Grizzlies	ECHL	1	0	0	0	0	—	—	—	—	—
2019–20	Dynamo Moscow	KHL	9	2	0	2	18	—	—	—	—	—
2020–21	Dynamo Moscow	KHL	38	0	4	4	54	5	0	0	0	2
2021–22	Dynamo Moscow	KHL	28	1	5	6	14	10	0	2	2	5
2022–23	Dynamo Moscow	KHL	48	0	5	5	33	—	—	—	—	—
2023–24	Avangard Omsk	KHL	40	5	2	7	21	12	1	0	1	2
2024–25	Avangard Omsk	KHL	18	0	1	1	12	—	—	—	—	—
2025–26	Torpedo Nizhny Novgorod	KHL	51	0	4	4	29	6	0	1	1	2
KHL totals			232	8	21	29	181	33	1	3	4	11

=== International ===
Year	Team	Event	Result	GP	G	A	Pts	PIM
2013	Russia	IH18	4th	4	0	0	0	0
2016	Russia	WJC	2nd place, silver medalist(s)	7	0	0	0	6
Junior totals				11	0	0	0	6

== Awards and honours ==
Award	Year
ECHL
Kelly Cup (Colorado Eagles)	2017
