= Julien Nantel =

Canadian ice hockey player (born 1996)

- Born: September 6, 1996 (age 29) Laval, Quebec, Canada
- Height: 6 ft 0 in (183 cm)
- Weight: 193 lb (88 kg; 13 st 11 lb)
- Position: Forward
- Shot: Left
- Played for: San Antonio Rampage; Colorado Eagles
- NHL draft: 204th overall, 2014; Colorado Avalanche
- Playing career: 2016–2022

Julien Nantel (born September 6, 1996) is a Canadian former professional ice hockey forward. He was drafted in the 6th round by the Colorado Avalanche in the 2014 NHL entry draft.

== Playing career ==
Nantel played 40 games for the Laval-Montreal Rousseau Royal in the QMAAA as a 15 year old, and scored 11 goals with 17 assists and 8 penalty minutes. In his second season with the Royal's he led the team in the playoffs to capture the championship and earn honors as the playoff MVP with 17 points in 17 games.

He was selected by Rouyn-Noranda Huskies in the second round (30th overall) of the 2012 QMJHL Entry Draft. Despite being ranked much higher, he was drafted in the 6th round of the 2014 NHL Entry draft but continued to play in the QMJHL; over the next two seasons he improved both his offensive numbers and his skill as a defensive forward. On March 9, 2016 he signed a three-year, entry-level contract with the Colorado Avalanche.

In his rookie professional season in 2016–17, Nantel was assigned to American Hockey League affiliate, the San Antonio Rampage, on October 1, 2016. Used in primarily a defensive forward role, Nantel appeared in 59 games with the Rampage for 8 points. On March 8, 2017, Nantel was re-assigned to secondary ECHL affiliate, the Colorado Eagles. Provided a larger role with the Eagles to continue his development, Nantel remained with the club through the post-season, flourishing in recording 8 goals and 16 points in 20 games to help the Eagles capture their first Kelly Cup.

As an impending restricted free agent following the conclusion of his entry-level contract, Nantel's tenure with the Avalanche ended after he was not tendered a qualifying offer on June 25, 2019. After exploring free agency, Nantel opted to return and continue with the Colorado Eagles, accepting a one-year AHL contract on July 23, 2019. In the 2019–20 season, Nantel in his fourth AHL campaign registered career best marks of 8 goals, 5 assists and 13 points in 35 games before the season was ended prematurely due to the COVID-19 pandemic.

Sitting out the ensuing 2020–21 season, Nantel returned to the professional ranks in agreeing to a contract with inaugural ECHL club, Trois-Rivières Lions, on July 16, 2021. In the 2021–22 season, Nantel was limited to just 33 regular season games due to an ankle injury and later a concussion, however was able to contribute with 17 points. After appearing in the opening two playoff contests, Nantel was demoted as a healthy scratch and later left the club announcing his retirement from professional hockey to pursue a career in finance.

== Career statistics ==
=== Regular season and playoffs ===
			Regular season					Playoffs
Season	Team	League	GP	G	A	Pts	PIM	GP	G	A	Pts	PIM
2011–12	Laval-Montréal Rousseau Royal	QMAAA	40	11	17	28	8	—	—	—	—	—
2012–13	Laval-Montréal Rousseau Royal	QMAAA	36	19	21	40	18	17	6	11	17	6
2012–13	Rouyn-Noranda Huskies	QMJHL	4	1	0	1	0	0	0	0	0	0
2013–14	Rouyn-Noranda Huskies	QMJHL	68	14	20	34	18	9	0	4	4	2
2014–15	Rouyn-Noranda Huskies	QMJHL	64	26	35	61	34	6	3	1	4	2
2015–16	Rouyn-Noranda Huskies	QMJHL	52	22	24	46	28	20	4	4	8	12
2016–17	San Antonio Rampage	AHL	59	5	3	8	10	—	—	—	—	—
2016–17	Colorado Eagles	ECHL	5	2	0	2	0	20	8	8	16	6
2017–18	San Antonio Rampage	AHL	48	6	2	8	12	—	—	—	—	—
2017–18	Colorado Eagles	ECHL	18	4	11	15	6	24	3	4	7	2
2018–19	Colorado Eagles	AHL	45	1	3	4	8	4	1	0	1	0
2018–19	Utah Grizzlies	ECHL	10	6	3	9	4	—	—	—	—	—
2019–20	Colorado Eagles	AHL	35	8	5	13	8	—	—	—	—	—
2021–22	Trois-Rivières Lions	ECHL	33	8	9	17	10	2	1	1	2	0
AHL totals			187	20	13	33	38	4	1	0	1	0

=== International ===
Year	Team	Event	Result	GP	G	A	Pts	PIM
2013	Canada Quebec	U17	4th	6	1	0	1	4
Junior totals				6	1	0	1	4

== Awards and honours ==
Award	Year
QMAAA
Playoff MVP	2013
QMJHL
President's Cup (Rouyn-Noranda Huskies)	2016
ECHL
Kelly Cup (Colorado Eagles)	2017, 2018
