= Kent Simpson (ice hockey, born 1992) =

Canadian ice hockey player

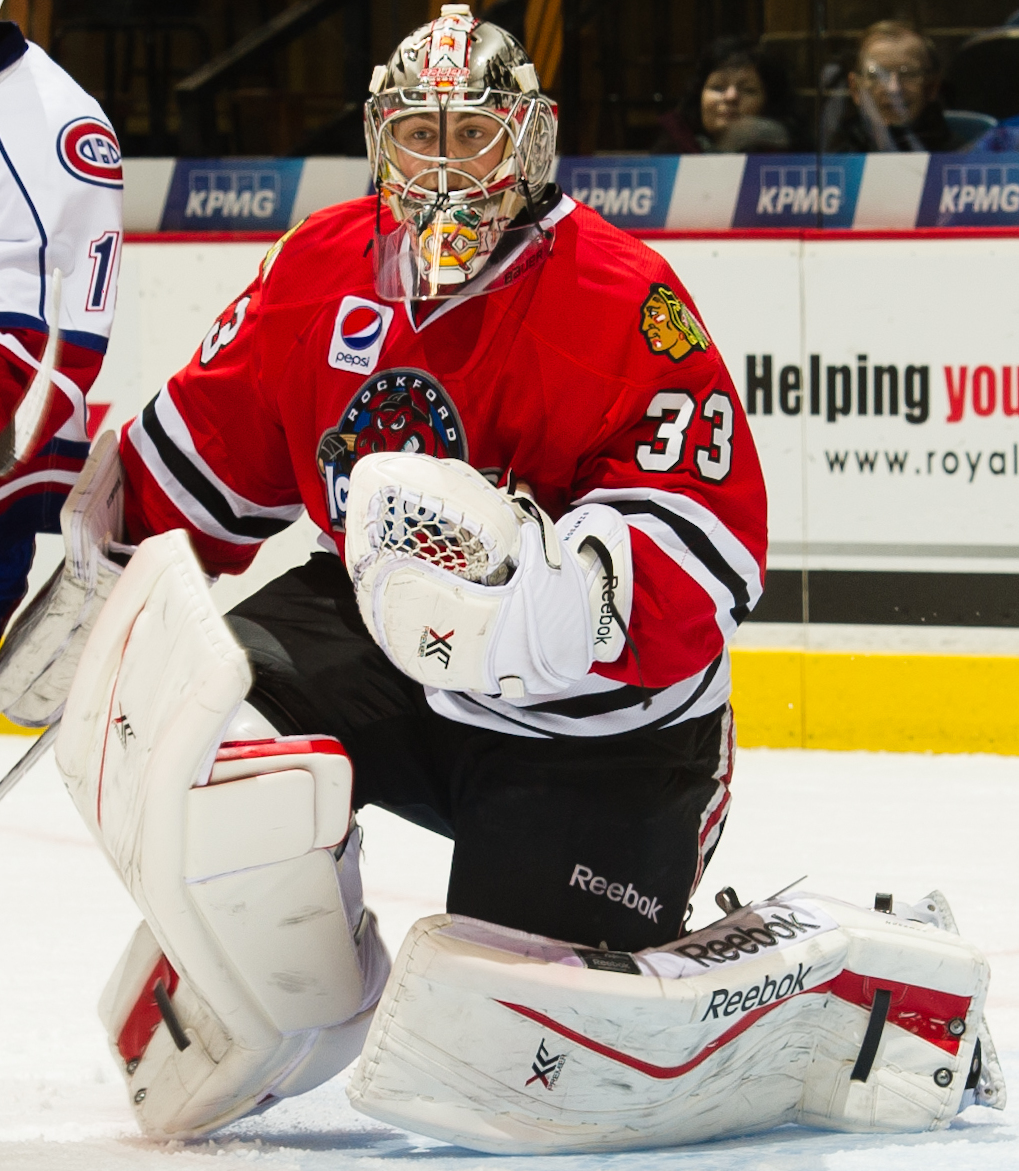
- Simpson with the Rockford IceHogs in 2013
- Born: March 26, 1992 (age 34) Edmonton, Alberta, Canada
- Height: 6 ft 3 in (191 cm)
- Weight: 200 lb (91 kg; 14 st 4 lb)
- Position: Goaltender
- Caught: Left
- Played for: Chicago Blackhawks
- NHL draft: 58th overall, 2010; Chicago Blackhawks
- Playing career: 2012–2017

Kent Rory Simpson (born March 26, 1992) is a Canadian former professional ice hockey goaltender who briefly played in the National Hockey League (NHL) with the Chicago Blackhawks. Simpson was selected by the Blackhawks in the second round (58th overall) of the 2010 NHL Entry Draft.

== Playing career ==
Simpson played major junior hockey with the Everett Silvertips of the Western Hockey League (WHL). He also won a silver medal with Team Pacific at the 2009 World U-17 Hockey Challenge and represented Team Canada at the 2010 IIHF World U18 Championships.

On March 31, 2012, the Rockford IceHogs of the American Hockey League (AHL) signed Simpson to an amateur try-out agreement, allowing the goaltender to make his professional debut in the AHL before the end of the 2011–12 season. On May 29, 2012, Simpson was signed by the Chicago Blackhawks of the National Hockey League (NHL) to a three-year entry-level contract.

On October 4, 2014, Simpson was traded by the Blackhawks along with Nick Leddy to the New York Islanders in exchange for Ville Pokka, T.J. Brennan and Anders Nilsson.

On July 15, 2015, Simpson was signed to a one-year AHL contract with the Stockton Heat, continuing his stay in Stockton after the previous season with former ECHL club, the Stockton Thunder. In the 2015–16 season, Simpson split the year between the Heat and ECHL affiliate, the Adirondack Flames. As the Heat's third choice goaltender, he recorded a 3-4 record in 11 appearances.

As a free agent in the off-season from the Heat, Simpson secured a one-year AHL contract with the San Antonio Rampage, an affiliate to the Colorado Avalanche, on July 18, 2016. He began the 2016–17 season with secondary affiliate and former team, the Colorado Eagles of the ECHL. Throughout the year, Simpson was recalled to the Rampage on multiple occasions, recording just 1 win in 9 games. He was returned to the Eagles for the playoffs, and served as backup in winning two series clinching games as Colorado claimed the Kelly Cup.

== Career statistics ==
=== Regular season and playoffs ===
			Regular season									Playoffs
Season	Team	League	GP	W	L	OTL	MIN	GA	SO	GAA	SV%	GP	W	L	MIN	GA	SO	GAA	SV%
2007–08	Everett Silvertips	WHL	1	0	0	0	29	1	0	2.07	.950	—	—	—	—	—	—	—	—
2008–09	Everett Silvertips	WHL	27	8	11	4	1451	93	1	3.85	.892	—	—	—	—	—	—	—	—
2009–10	Everett Silvertips	WHL	34	22	9	1	1938	73	1	2.26	.925	5	2	3	298	13	1	2.62	.908
2010–11	Everett Silvertips	WHL	52	21	20	9	3132	145	2	2.78	.916	—	—	—	—	—	—	—	—
2011–12	Everett Silvertips	WHL	60	21	30	7	3481	193	2	3.33	.909	4	0	4	225	15	0	4.00	.883
2011–12	Rockford IceHogs	AHL	1	0	0	1	63	3	0	2.85	.927	—	—	—	—	—	—	—	—
2012–13	Toledo Walleye	ECHL	41	20	14	5	2387	94	2	2.36	.912	3	0	3	193	11	0	3.42	.884
2012–13	Rockford IceHogs	AHL	2	1	1	0	98	5	0	3.07	.924	—	—	—	—	—	—	—	—
2013–14	Rockford IceHogs	AHL	31	11	14	1	1615	98	0	3.64	.891	—	—	—	—	—	—	—	—
2013–14	Chicago Blackhawks	NHL	1	0	0	0	20	2	0	6.00	.714	—	—	—	—	—	—	—	—
2014–15	Colorado Eagles	ECHL	3	1	2	0	178	11	0	3.71	.904	—	—	—	—	—	—	—	—
2014–15	Bridgeport Sound Tigers	AHL	4	1	3	0	207	9	0	2.61	.900	—	—	—	—	—	—	—	—
2014–15	Stockton Thunder	ECHL	26	7	17	1	1468	82	0	3.35	.899	—	—	—	—	—	—	—	—
2015–16	Stockton Heat	AHL	11	3	4	0	381	26	0	4.09	.861	—	—	—	—	—	—	—	—
2015–16	Adirondack Thunder	ECHL	13	7	4	2	756	30	3	2.38	.926	—	—	—	—	—	—	—	—
2016–17	Colorado Eagles	ECHL	19	9	9	1	1126	46	1	2.45	.912	4	2	2	239	12	0	3.02	.879
2016–17	San Antonio Rampage	AHL	9	1	4	2	486	27	0	3.33	.892	—	—	—	—	—	—	—	—
NHL totals			1	0	0	0	20	2	0	6.00	.714	—	—	—	—	—	—	—	—

=== International ===
Year	Team	Event	Result	GP	W	L	T/OTL	MIN	GA	SO	GAA	SV%
2009	Canada Pacific	U17	2nd place, silver medalist(s)	6	—	—	—	—	—	—	4.60	.870
2010	Canada	WJC18	7th	2	—	—	—	44	3	0	4.11	.857
Junior totals				8	—	—	—	—	—	—	—	—

== Awards and honours ==
Award	Year
ECHL
Kelly Cup (Colorado Eagles)	2017

== See also ==
- List of players who played only one game in the NHL
