= Taylor Doherty =

Canadian ice hockey player (born 1991)

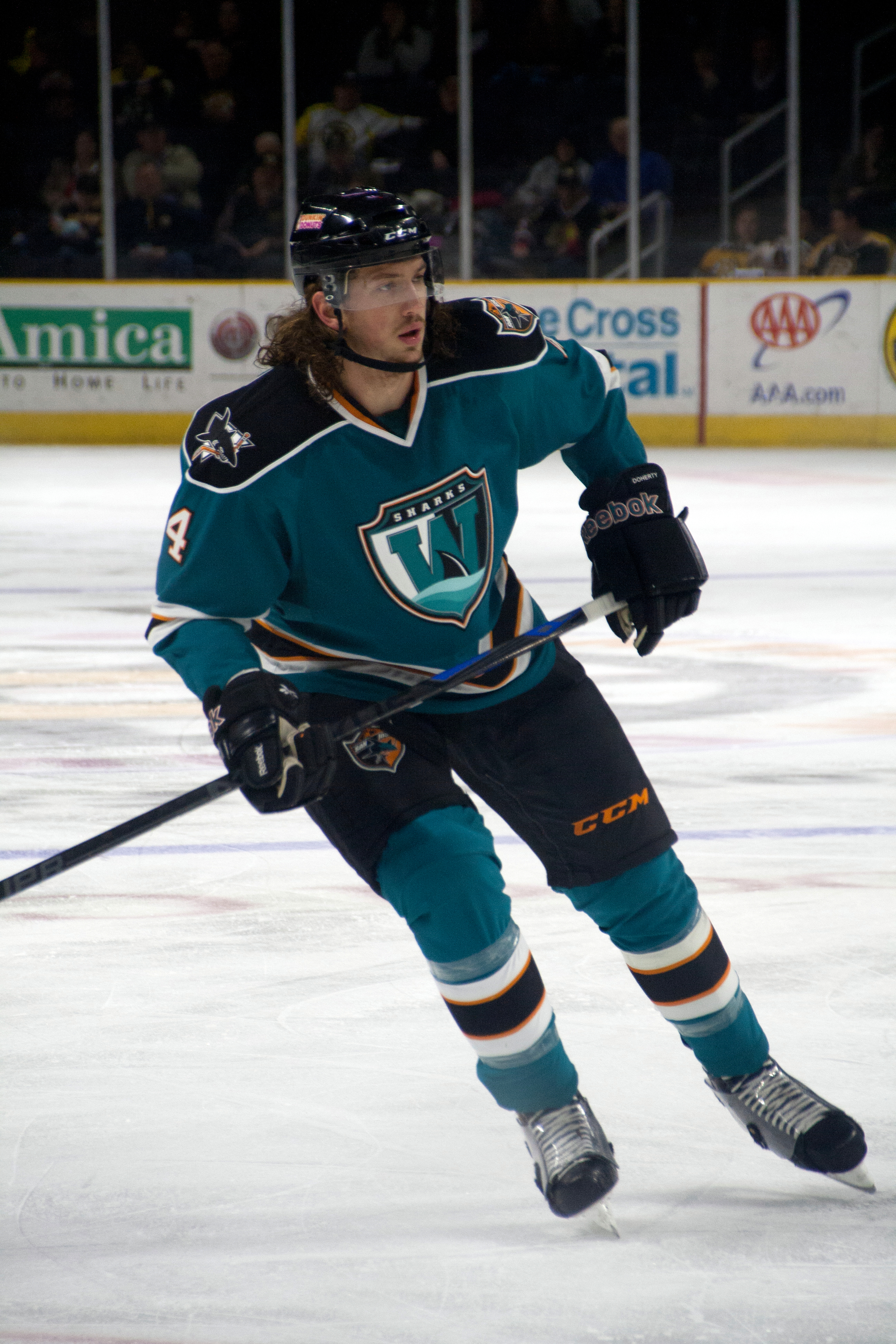
- Doherty with the Worcester Sharks in 2015
- Born: March 2, 1991 (age 35) Cambridge, Ontario, Canada
- Height: 6 ft 7 in (201 cm)
- Weight: 235 lb (107 kg; 16 st 11 lb)
- Position: Defence
- Shoots: Right
- DEL2 team Former teams: Eispiraten Crimmitschau; Worcester Sharks; Toronto Marlies; Providence Bruins; HC Bílí Tygři Liberec; Orli Znojmo; Cracovia Krakow; Nottingham Panthers; HK Dukla Michalovce
- NHL draft: 57th overall, 2009; San Jose Sharks
- Playing career: 2011–present

Taylor Doherty (born March 2, 1991) is a Canadian professional ice hockey defenceman. He is currently playing for Eispiraten Crimmitschau of the DEL2.

He previously iced with Nottingham Panthers in the UK's Elite Ice Hockey League (EIHL). Doherty was selected by the San Jose Sharks in the second round (57th overall) of the 2009 NHL entry draft.

== Playing career ==
=== Junior ===
Doherty was drafted by the Kingston Frontenacs of the Ontario Hockey League (OHL) in the second round, 29th overall, of the 2007 OHL Priority Selection.

Doherty made his OHL debut with the Frontenacs on September 21, 2007, as he was held off the scoresheet in an 8–1 loss to the Belleville Bulls. Doherty scored his first OHL goal on October 21, 2007 against Bryce O'Hagan of the Sault Ste. Marie Greyhounds in a 6–2 loss. He finished the 2007–08 season with six goals and 20 points in 64 games with Kingston.

In his second season with the Frontenacs in 2008–09, Doherty dressed for all 68 games, scoring two goals and 20 points, while accumulating 140 penalty minutes, as the club failed to qualify for the playoffs for the second consecutive season.

Doherty saw a huge improvement with his offensive numbers during the 2009–10 season, as he scored 16 goals and 44 points in 63 games for Kingston, helping the club reach the playoffs. In five playoff games, Doherty had a goal and five points, as the Frontenacs lost in the Eastern Conference quarter-finals to the Brampton Battalion.

Doherty was named the Frontenacs captain for the 2010–11 season, and in 68 games, Doherty had 14 goals and 53 points, as the club reached the playoffs for the second straight season. In five playoff games, Doherty earned three assists, as Kingston lost to the Oshawa Generals in the Eastern Conference quarter-finals.

=== Professional ===
==== San Jose Sharks ====
Doherty was drafted by the San Jose Sharks in the second round, 57th overall, at the 2009 NHL entry draft. Doherty signed a three-year entry-level contract with the Sharks on June 1, 2010.

Doherty made his professional hockey debut with the Sharks' American Hockey League (AHL) affiliate, the Worcester Sharks, on April 5, 2011, in a 2–1 shootout loss to the Portland Pirates. Doherty appeared in three games with Worcester during the 2010–11 season, earning no points.

He spent the entire 2011–12 with Worcester, and on January 28, 2012, Doherty earned his first career point, an assist, in a 3–2 overtime loss to the Manchester Monarchs. In 63 games with the team, Doherty had no goals and six assists.

In 2012–13 with Worcester, Doherty scored his first career professional goal on November 3, 2012. Doherty scored against Mark Dekanich of the St. John's IceCaps in a 3–2 overtime loss. Later in the season, Doherty suffered a sliced Achilles tendon, and was limited to 40 games with the team, scoring a goal and 10 points.

Doherty saw his offensive production increase during the 2013-14 season, scoring four goals and 15 points in 69 games. On February 27, 2014, Doherty earned two assists for his first multi-point game in over a year.

During the 2014-15 season, Doherty played in 59 games with Worcester, scoring two goals and seven points. The club reached the post-season for the first time in Doherty's tenure with the club, however, he did not appear in any games due to injuries.

At the conclusion of the 2015 playoffs, Doherty was released to free agency.

==== Minor Leagues ====
Doherty signed with the Rapid City Rush of the ECHL for the 2015-16 season on October 20. In 56 games with the Rush, Doherty scored eight goals and 24 points. The Rush loaned Doherty to the Toronto Marlies of the AHL, where in 12 games, Doherty earned three assists.

Doherty signed with the Orlando Solar Bears of the ECHL for the 2016-17 season. Doherty scored three goals and 15 points in 30 games with Orlando during the regular season. In the post-season, Doherty scored four goals and seven points in seven games. The Solar Bears loaned him to the Providence Bruins of the American Hockey League during the season, in which he recorded two assists in 10 games with the Bruins/

Doherty signed and was named an assistant captain with the Atlanta Gladiators of the ECHL for the 2017-18 season. In 63 games, Doherty scored six goals and 19 points, helping Atlanta into the playoffs. In four post-season games, Doherty recorded an assist. The Gladiators loaned Doherty to the Providence Bruins for one game during the 2017-18 season, where he had no points and five penalty minutes.

==== Europe ====
On August 15, 2018, Doherty embarked on a European career in agreeing to a one-year deal with Czech club, HC Bílí Tygři Liberec of the Czech Extraliga (ELH). In 50 games, Doherty scored a goal and six points. In 17 playoff games, Doherty had no points.

==== Return to ECHL ====
After the conclusion of his contract in the Czech Republic, Doherty opted to return to North America as a free agent, later signing for a second stint with the Orlando Solar Bears of the ECHL on September 25, 2019. In the 2019–20 season, Doherty made 17 appearances with the Solar Bears, contributing 5 points, before he was traded to the Fort Wayne Komets on December 1, 2019.

==== Return to Europe ====
After a short spell with Orli Znojmo in the Austrian Hockey League, Doherty spent the 2020-21 season in Poland with Cracovia Krakow.

In June 2021, UK EIHL side Nottingham Panthers announced Doherty had agreed to join the team for the 2021-22 season.

In January 2022, Doherty parted company with Nottingham by mutual consent in order to join Slovak Extraliga side HK Dukla Michalovce.

== International play ==
Doherty played with Team Ontario at the 2008 World U-17 Hockey Challenge, earning two assists in six games, winning the gold medal as Ontario defeated the United States 3–0 in the gold medal game.

Doherty appeared for Team Canada at the 2009 IIHF World U18 Championships, where he was held pointless in six games, as Canada finished the tournament in fourth place.

== Career statistics ==
=== Regular season and playoffs ===
			Regular season					Playoffs
Season	Team	League	GP	G	A	Pts	PIM	GP	G	A	Pts	PIM
2007–08	Kingston Frontenacs	OHL	64	6	14	20	118	—	—	—	—	—
2008–09	Kingston Frontenacs	OHL	68	2	18	20	140	—	—	—	—	—
2009–10	Kingston Frontenacs	OHL	63	16	28	44	114	5	1	4	5	0
2010–11	Kingston Frontenacs	OHL	68	14	39	53	86	5	0	3	3	12
2010–11	Worcester Sharks	AHL	3	0	0	0	0	—	—	—	—	—
2011–12	Worcester Sharks	AHL	63	0	6	6	76	—	—	—	—	—
2012–13	Worcester Sharks	AHL	40	1	9	10	67	—	—	—	—	—
2013–14	Worcester Sharks	AHL	69	4	11	15	111	—	—	—	—	—
2014–15	Worcester Sharks	AHL	59	2	5	7	93	—	—	—	—	—
2015–16	Rapid City Rush	ECHL	56	8	16	24	32	—	—	—	—	—
2015–16	Toronto Marlies	AHL	12	0	3	3	20	—	—	—	—	—
2016–17	Orlando Solar Bears	ECHL	30	3	12	15	86	7	4	3	7	15
2016–17	Providence Bruins	AHL	10	0	2	2	25	—	—	—	—	—
2017–18	Atlanta Gladiators	ECHL	63	6	13	19	89	4	0	1	1	2
2017–18	Providence Bruins	AHL	1	0	0	0	5	—	—	—	—	—
2018–19	HC Bílí Tygři Liberec	ELH	50	1	5	6	38	17	0	0	0	6
2019–20	Orlando Solar Bears	ECHL	17	1	4	5	28	—	—	—	—	—
2019–20	Fort Wayne Komets	ECHL	26	1	5	6	43	—	—	—	—	—
2019–20	Orli Znojmo	EBEL	7	1	3	4	2	3	1	0	1	2
2020–21	Cracovia Krakow	Polska Hokej Liga	22	4	5	9	24	17	0	7	7	8
2021–22	Nottingham Panthers	EIHL	16	0	4	4	12	—	—	—	—	—
2021–22	HK Dukla Michalovce	Slovak	18	1	3	4	20	6	0	2	2	4
AHL totals			257	7	36	43	397	—	—	—	—	—

=== International ===
Year	Team	Event	Result	GP	G	A	Pts	PIM
2008	Canada Ontario	U17	1st place, gold medalist(s)	6	0	2	2	8
2009	Canada	U18	4th	6	0	0	0	8
Junior totals				12	0	2	2	16
