= Matthew Register =

Canadian ice hockey player (born 1989)

- Born: September 2, 1989 (age 36) Calgary, Alberta, Canada
- Height: 6 ft 2 in (188 cm)
- Weight: 225 lb (102 kg; 16 st 1 lb)
- Position: Defence
- Shoots: Left
- ECHL team Former teams: Idaho Steelheads; Allen Americans; Tulsa Oilers; Arizona Sundogs; Ontario Reign; Chicago Wolves; Atlanta Gladiators; Colorado Eagles; Toledo Walleye; Hartford Wolf Pack; Iowa Wild; Cardiff Devils
- NHL draft: Undrafted
- Playing career: 2012–present

Matthew Register (born September 2, 1989) is a Canadian professional ice hockey defenceman who currently plays with the Idaho Steelheads in the ECHL.

== Playing career ==
Register made his professional debut on January 25, 2012, playing defence for the Allen Americans of the Central Hockey League in a 2–0 home game shut-out over the Arizona Sundogs.

During the 2012-2013 season, Register split time with the Tulsa Oilers and the Arizona Sundogs. He played a total of 47 games with 2 goals and 14 assists between both teams

On February 22, 2013, the Manchester Monarchs of the American Hockey League (AHL) signed Register to a one-year AHL contract and then loaned him to the Ontario Reign of the ECHL where he skated in 17 regular season games and 10 playoff contests during the 2012–13 season.

On July 3, 2013, the Ontario Reign re-signed Register for the 2013–14 ECHL season.

On June 10, 2014, Register signed a one-year contract with Hungarian club Alba Volán Székesfehérvár, competing in the Austrian Hockey League (EBEL). Prior to the 2014–15 season, Register was released from his contract and returned to North America, in accepting a try-out to the Chicago Wolves AHL training camp. On October 1, 2014, Register agreed to return to the Reign in signing a standard player contract.

In the 2015–16 season, Register initially signed with the Atlanta Gladiators of the ECHL. Appearing in 40 games with the Glads, he contributed with 27 points before he was dealt to reigning Champions, the Allen Americans on March 10, 2016. Register closed out the season among the Americans' top four defenders with 10 points in 13 games. In the post-season, Register featured in every game, helping the Americans defend the Kelly Cup with 8 points in 23 games.

On September 12, 2016, Register continued his ECHL career, agreeing to a one-year deal with his fourth ECHL club, the Colorado Eagles. In the 2016–17, Register quickly established himself as the club's top defender, recapturing his form with the Ontario Reign in recording career highs with 18 goals and 64 points in 72 regular season games to be honored with his second career ECHL Defenseman of the year accolade. In the post-season, Register led the Eagles from the blueline scoring 8 goals and 24 points in just 20 games to claim his second consecutive Kelly Cup.

During the post-season run, Register agreed for the following season to move abroad to Austria, signing a one-year deal with EC VSV of the EBEL on May 2, 2017. Following his Kelly Cup success, Register had a change of heart and despite not signing an out-clause to his contract, he refused to start his contract with Villach. He was released from his contract on June 28, 2017. On September 12, 2017, Register re-signed to continue his tenure with the Colorado Eagles for the 2017–18 season. Register again led the Eagles defense, replicating his impressive feat of earning a consecutive selection to the ECHL's First All-Star Team and named the Defenseman of the Year with a career best 65 points in 72 games. He helped Colorado defend the Kelly Cup, contributing with 20 points in 24 games.

With the promotion of the Eagles to the AHL in the off-season, Register left as a free agent and opted to continue in the ECHL, agreeing to terms with the Toledo Walleye on September 11, 2018. On September 13, 2018, he was invited to attend NHL affiliate, the Detroit Red Wings training camp in preparation for the 2018–19 season. Returning to the Walleye, Register registered 46 points in 62 regular season games. In the post-season, Register failed to win the Championship for the fourth consecutive season, despite posting 19 points in 24 games and advancing to the Kelly Cup Finals.

On August 31, 2019, Register signed a contract in a return to former club the Allen Americans. Prior to the 2019–20 season, Register attended the Americans AHL affiliate training camp and was signed to a PTO with the Iowa Wild on October 3, 2019.

In June 2021, UK EIHL side Cardiff Devils announced Register had agreed to terms and signed for the 2021–22 season. Register helped Cardiff win the 2022 EIHL play-off title, while also being named as a Second Team All-Star.

In October 2022, Register agreed terms to return to North America with ECHL side Idaho Steelheads.

== Career statistics ==
			Regular season					Playoffs
Season	Team	League	GP	G	A	Pts	PIM	GP	G	A	Pts	PIM
2006–07	Bonnyville Pontiacs	AJHL	2	0	0	0	4	—	—	—	—	—
2007–08	Bonnyville Pontiacs	AJHL	44	0	2	2	16	11	0	0	0	22
2008–09	Bonnyville Pontiacs	AJHL	62	14	17	31	101	4	0	0	0	2
2009–10	Bonnyville Pontiacs	AJHL	58	16	45	61	49	7	1	3	4	4
2011–12	Sylvan Lake Admirals	ChHL	17	6	18	24	14	—	—	—	—	—
2011–12	Allen Americans	CHL	22	1	3	4	2	—	—	—	—	—
2012–13	Tulsa Oilers	CHL	25	1	10	11	6	—	—	—	—	—
2012–13	Arizona Sundogs	CHL	26	1	4	5	20	—	—	—	—	—
2012–13	Ontario Reign	ECHL	17	4	9	13	18	10	0	3	3	15
2013–14	Ontario Reign	ECHL	67	14	30	44	56	4	1	1	2	2
2014–15	Ontario Reign	ECHL	60	14	36	50	50	19	7	11	18	16
2014–15	Chicago Wolves	AHL	6	0	4	4	2	—	—	—	—	—
2015–16	Atlanta Gladiators	ECHL	40	6	21	27	30	—	—	—	—	—
2015–16	Allen Americans	ECHL	13	1	9	10	8	23	2	6	8	10
2016–17	Colorado Eagles	ECHL	72	18	46	64	59	20	8	16	24	18
2017–18	Colorado Eagles	ECHL	72	17	48	65	51	24	3	17	20	16
2018–19	Toledo Walleye	ECHL	62	12	34	46	32	24	4	15	19	14
2018–19	Hartford Wolf Pack	AHL	5	0	1	1	0	—	—	—	—	—
2019–20	Iowa Wild	AHL	30	1	2	3	10	—	—	—	—	—
2019–20	Allen Americans	ECHL	3	0	3	3	2	—	—	—	—	—
2020–21	Iowa Wild	AHL	2	0	0	0	0	—	—	—	—	—
2020–21	Allen Americans	ECHL	66	5	47	52	32	7	1	5	6	0
2021–22	Cardiff Devils	EIHL	53	8	35	43	37	4	1	1	2	4
2022–23	Idaho Steelheads	ECHL	68	9	43	52	26	15	1	13	14	4
2023–24	Idaho Steelheads	ECHL	71	10	54	64	52	10	2	2	4	8
2024–25	Idaho Steelheads	ECHL	72	6	51	57	50	—	—	—	—	—
2025–26	Allen Americans	ECHL	4	2	1	3	2	—	—	—	—	—
AHL totals			43	1	7	8	12	—	—	—	—	—

== Awards and honours ==
Award	Year
AJHL
North All-Star Team	2010
Most Outstanding Defenseman	2010
ECHL
All-ECHL First Team	2013–14, 2014–15, 2016–17, 2017–18
All-ECHL Second Team	2018–19, 2020–21
Defenseman of the Year	2013–14, 2016–17, 2017–18
Kelly Cup	2016, 2017, 2018
Kelly Cup MVP	2017
3ICE
Larry Murphy Best Defensive Player Award	2023
