= Anthony Peters (ice hockey) =

Canadian ice hockey player

- Born: December 31, 1990 (age 35) Blyth, Ontario, Canada
- Height: 6 ft 1 in (185 cm)
- Weight: 196 lb (89 kg; 14 st 0 lb)
- Position: Goaltender
- Caught: Left
- Played for: Rochester Americans; Charlotte Checkers; Wilkes-Barre/Scranton Penguins; Iserlohn Roosters; MODO Hockey; Graz99ers; HC Slovan Bratislava; HK Poprad
- Playing career: 2014–2023

Anthony Peters (born December 31, 1990) is a Canadian former professional ice hockey goaltender and current head coach and general manager of the Reading Royals. He previously served as assistant coach of the Florida Everblades of the ECHL.

His elder brother Justin is also a goaltender.

== Career statistics ==
=== Regular season ===
			Regular season									Playoffs							
Season	Team	League	GP	W	L	OT	MIN	GA	SO	GAA	SV%	GP	W	L	MIN	GA	SO	GAA	SV%
2006–07	Oshawa Generals	OHL	11	1	5	2	571	54	0	5.68	.825	—	—	—	—	—	—	—	—
2007–08	Kingston Frontenacs	OHL	7	0	2	0	263	25	0	5.71	.838	—	—	—	—	—	—	—	—
2008–09	Kingston Frontenacs	OHL	11	0	8	1	542	46	0	5.10	.860	1	—	—	—	—	—	0.00	1.000
2008–09	Saginaw Spirit	OHL	10	4	3	2	539	27	1	3.00	.905	—	—	—	—	—	—	—	—
2009–10	Saginaw Spirit	OHL	14	4	6	2	745	44	0	3.54	.900	—	—	—	—	—	—	—	—
2009–10	Belleville Bulls	OHL	17	4	12	1	935	57	1	3.66	.896	—	—	—	—	—	—	—	—
2010–11	Mississauga St. Michael's Majors	OHL	15	10	2	1	780	32	0	2.46	.904	—	—	—	—	—	—	—	—
2010–11	Listowel Cyclones	GOJHL	12	9	1	2	705	32	2	2.72	.923	19	10	9	—	—	2	2.66	.926
2011–12	Saint Mary's University Huskies	USports	15	9	3	0	829	35	0	2.53	.915	4	—	—	—	—	—	3.16	.875
2012–13	Saint Mary's University Huskies	USports	26	17	9	0	–	–	–	2.44	.909	7	—	—	—	—	—	1.61	.951
2013–14	Saint Mary's University Huskies	USports	18	10	8	0	–	–	–	3.21	.893	11	—	—	—	—	—	1.92	.935
2014–15	Saint Mary's University Huskies	USports	23	16	7	0	–	–	–	2.30	.926	8	—	—	—	—	—	2.21	.933
2014–15	Florida Everblades	ECHL	2	2	0	0	125	2	1	0.96	.966	—	—	—	—	—	—	—	—
2014–15	Rochester Americans	AHL	7	1	6	0	398	27	0	4.07	.886	—	—	—	—	—	—	—	—
2015–16	Florida Everblades	ECHL	46	27	15	2	2675	98	3	2.20	.920	5	—	—	—	—	—	4.61	.853
2015–16	Charlotte Checkers	AHL	1	0	1	0	60	5	0	5.00	898	—	—	—	—	—	—	—	—
2016–17	Florida Everblades	ECHL	52	31	16	1	2970	154	2	3.11	.895	7	—	—	—	—	—	3.01	.892
2017–18	Cincinnati Cyclones	ECHL	16	10	4	1	922	36	1	2.34	.925	—	—	—	—	—	—	—	—
2017–18	Wilkes-Barre/Scranton Penguins	AHL	24	12	7	4	1330	60	1	2.71	.907	—	—	—	—	—	—	—	—
2018–19	Wilkes-Barre/Scranton Penguins	AHL	19	6	10	2	1098	60	1	3.28	.890	—	—	—	—	—	—	—	—
2019–20	Iserlohn Roosters	DEL	28	7	20	0	1537	82	0	3.20	.909	—	—	—	—	—	—	—	—
2020–21	MODO Hockey	Allsv	40	19	21	0	2308	122	0	3.17	.906	—	—	—	—	—	—	—	—
2021–22	Graz99ers	ICEHL	4	1	3	0	246	13	0	3.17	.902	—	—	—	—	—	—	—	—
2021–22	HC Slovan Bratislava	SVK	5	–	–	–	305	7	0	1.38	.910	12	—	—	—	—	—	1.99	.916
2022–23	HK Poprad	SVK	40	12	16	0	2364	106	0	2.69	.923	3	0	3	175	6	—	2.06	.923
ECHL Totals			116	70	35	5	6692	290	7	2.60	.927	12	–	–	–	–	–	3.81	.873

== Awards and honors ==
Award	Year
Slovak Extraliga	2022
