= Evan Rankin =

American ice hockey player

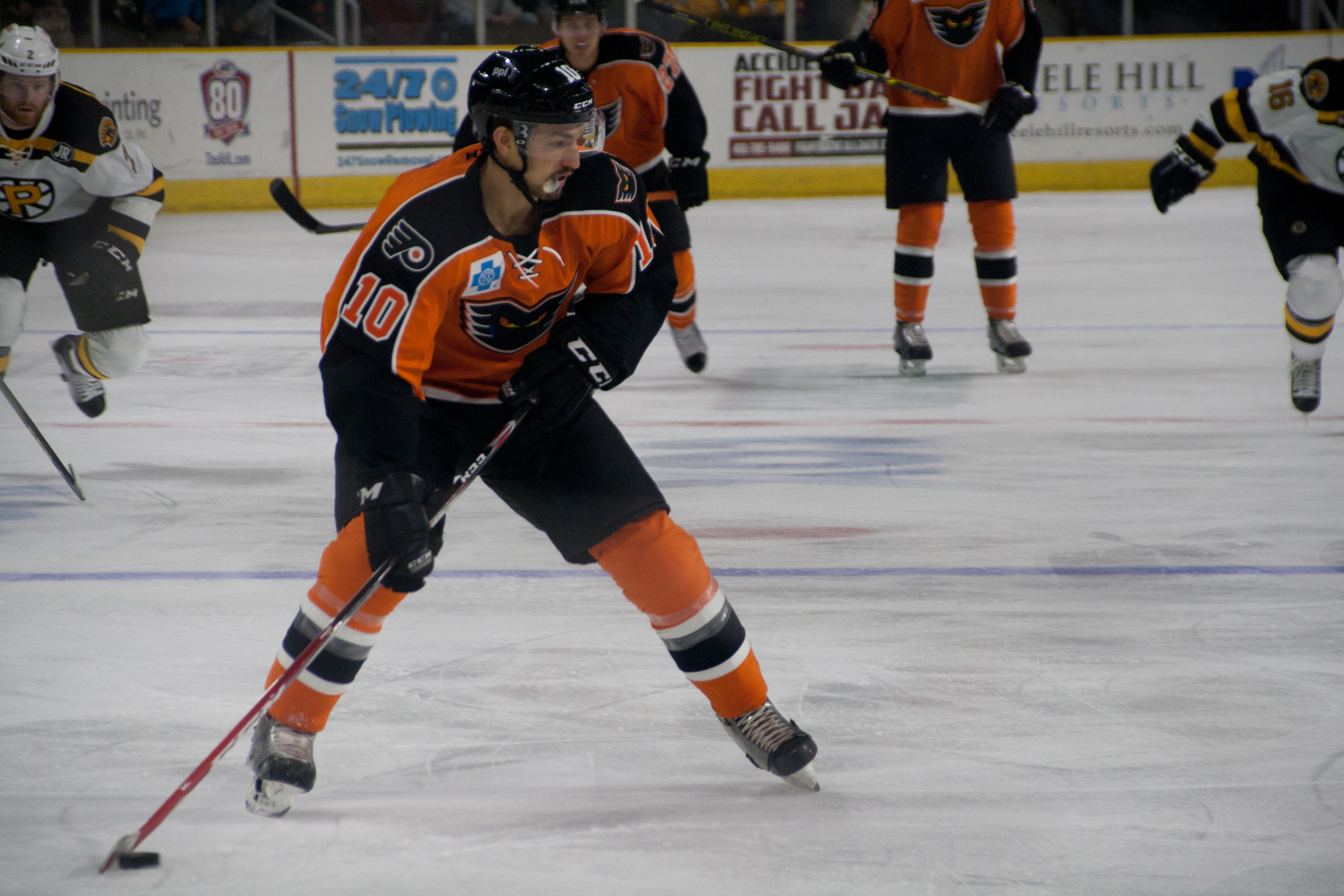
- Rankin with the Lehigh Valley Phantoms in 2016
- Born: March 28, 1986 (age 39) Portage, Michigan, U.S.
- Height: 6 ft 1 in (185 cm)
- Weight: 180 lb (82 kg; 12 st 12 lb)
- Position: Right wing
- Shot: Right
- Played for: Manitoba Moose; Grand Rapids Griffins; Rochester Americans; Syracuse Crunch; Kölner Haie; Lehigh Valley Phantoms; St. John's IceCaps; Utica Comets
- NHL draft: Undrafted
- Playing career: 2008–2017

Evan Rankin (born March 28, 1986) is an American former professional ice hockey player. He last played with the Toledo Walleye of the ECHL.

== Playing career ==
Rankin played regularly for the Toledo Walleye of the ECHL between 2009 and 2011. On November 25, 2011, the Notre Dame product was signed by the Rochester Americans of the American Hockey League to a professional tryout contract. After contributing immediately to the offense, Rankin remained with the Americans for the duration of the 2011–12 season, signing his first AHL contract and scoring an impressive 29 points in 35 games.

On July 3, 2012, the Americans announced that Rankin had signed a one-year contract extension to remain with the team in the AHL. During the 2012–13 season, he played in 48 games and contributed offensively with 31 points.

Rankin departed the Amerks as a free agent and, on July 10, 2013, signed a one-year deal with the Syracuse Crunch of the AHL.

On July 22, 2014, Rankin took his career overseas by signing a one-year contract with Kölner Haie of the German DEL. During the 2014–15 season, he played 18 games for the team but had difficulty adjusting to the European style of play, managing only 3 points. As a result, he chose to return to North America and rejoined the Rochester Americans in the AHL for a second stint on January 26, 2015.

After completing his fifth season with the Walleye in 2016-17, Rankin, who held the franchise record for most goals, officially announced his retirement from professional hockey on September 1, 2017.

== Career statistics ==
| | | | Regular season | | | | | Playoffs |
| Season | Team | League | GP | G | A | Pts | PIM | GP | G | A | Pts | PIM |
|---|---|---|---|---|---|---|---|---|---|---|---|---|
| 2003–04 | Lincoln Stars | USHL | 59 | 15 | 18 | 33 | 35 | — | — | — | — | — |
| 2004–05 | Notre Dame | CCHA | 36 | 5 | 5 | 10 | 49 | — | — | — | — | — |
| 2005–06 | Notre Dame | CCHA | 29 | 3 | 2 | 5 | 10 | — | — | — | — | — |
| 2006–07 | Notre Dame | CCHA | 31 | 4 | 3 | 7 | 14 | — | — | — | — | — |
| 2007–08 | Notre Dame | CCHA | 47 | 8 | 11 | 19 | 28 | — | — | — | — | — |
| 2008–09 | Rio Grande Valley Killer Bees | CHL | 64 | 28 | 23 | 51 | 65 | 7 | 2 | 3 | 5 | 6 |
| 2009–10 | Toledo Walleye | ECHL | 65 | 32 | 25 | 57 | 30 | 4 | 0 | 1 | 1 | 2 |
| 2009–10 | Manitoba Moose | AHL | 4 | 1 | 0 | 1 | 4 | — | — | — | — | — |
| 2010–11 | Toledo Walleye | ECHL | 63 | 23 | 32 | 55 | 53 | — | — | — | — | — |
| 2010–11 | Grand Rapids Griffins | AHL | 10 | 1 | 1 | 2 | 7 | — | — | — | — | — |
| 2011–12 | Toledo Walleye | ECHL | 15 | 10 | 8 | 18 | 8 | — | — | — | — | — |
| 2011–12 | Rochester Americans | AHL | 35 | 15 | 14 | 29 | 9 | 2 | 0 | 1 | 1 | 0 |
| 2012–13 | Rochester Americans | AHL | 48 | 14 | 17 | 31 | 20 | — | — | — | — | — |
| 2013–14 | Syracuse Crunch | AHL | 62 | 16 | 14 | 30 | 61 | — | — | — | — | — |
| 2014–15 | Kölner Haie | DEL | 18 | 2 | 1 | 3 | 6 | — | — | — | — | — |
| 2014–15 | Rochester Americans | AHL | 32 | 8 | 7 | 15 | 8 | — | — | — | — | — |
| 2015–16 | Toledo Walleye | ECHL | 29 | 18 | 11 | 29 | 14 | — | — | — | — | — |
| 2015–16 | Lehigh Valley Phantoms | AHL | 24 | 1 | 6 | 7 | 6 | — | — | — | — | — |
| 2015–16 | St. John's IceCaps | AHL | 3 | 0 | 0 | 0 | 2 | — | — | — | — | — |
| 2015–16 | Utica Comets | AHL | 3 | 0 | 0 | 0 | 0 | — | — | — | — | — |
| 2016–17 | Toledo Walleye | ECHL | 66 | 28 | 27 | 55 | 49 | 17 | 8 | 6 | 14 | 13 |
| AHL totals | | | 215 | 56 | 59 | 115 | 117 | 2 | 0 | 1 | 1 | 0 |
