= Matt Garbowsky =

Canadian ice hockey player

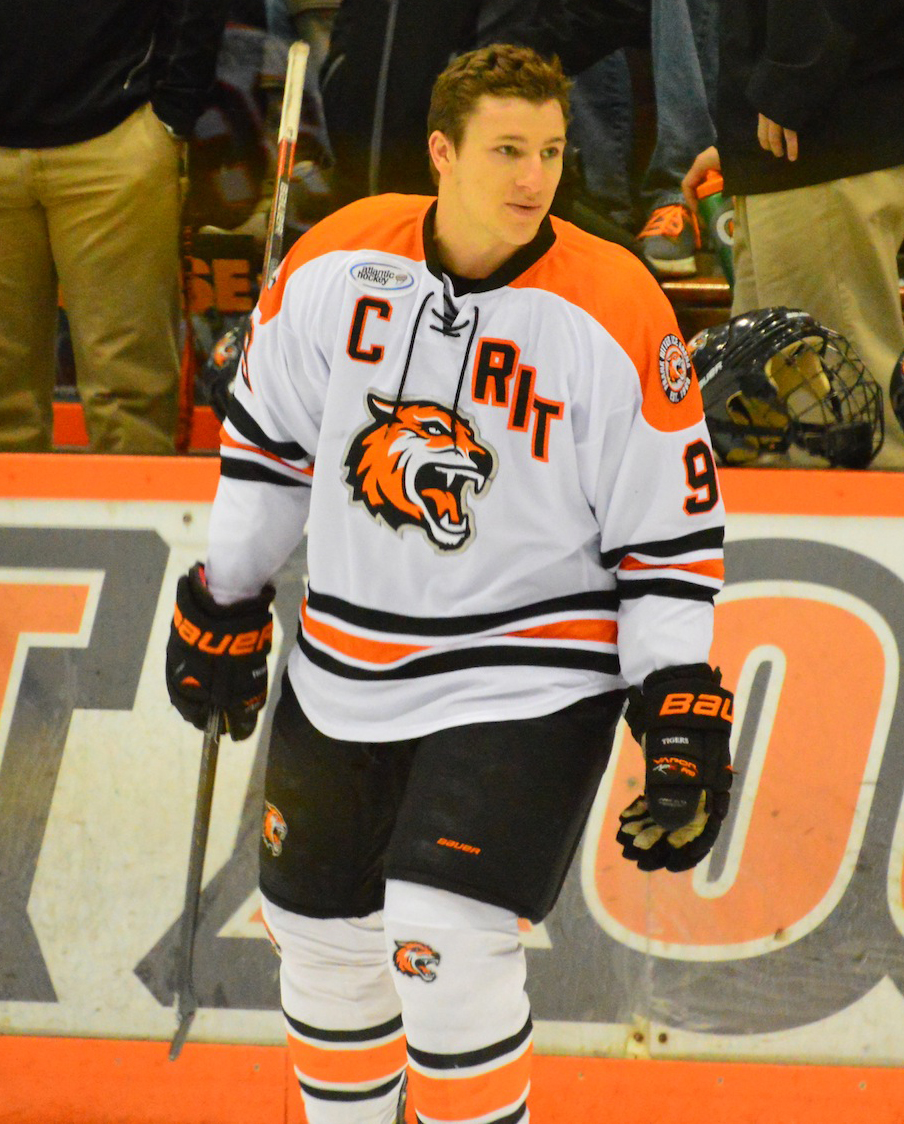
- Born: July 26, 1990 (age 35) St. George, Ontario, Canada
- Height: 5 ft 10 in (178 cm)
- Weight: 190 lb (86 kg; 13 st 8 lb)
- Position: Centre
- Shot: Left
- Played for: Rochester Americans; Graz99ers
- NHL draft: Undrafted
- Playing career: 2015–2020

Matt Garbowsky (born July 26, 1990) is a Canadian professional ice hockey center. He is currently an unrestricted free agent who most recently played with the Graz99ers of the Austrian Hockey League (EBEL).

== Playing career ==
=== Junior ===
Garbowsky played two seasons for the Powell River Kings of the British Columbia Hockey League (BCHL). He scored 172 points (87 goals, 85 assists) in 146 games during the two seasons, and was named a 2011 Coastal Conference All-Star and MVP.

=== College ===
Garbowsky attended Rochester Institute of Technology where he played four seasons (2011–15) with the RIT Tigers men's ice hockey team, which competes in NCAA's Division I in the Atlantic Hockey conference. In his four seasons at RIT, during three of which he served as captain, he compiled 114 points (48 goals, 66 assists), placing him fifth all-time among RIT players during the team's Division I era. He was forced to miss 24 games during his junior season (2013–14) due to a wrist injury, but still managed to record 7 points in just 13 games. In his senior year (2014–15), Garbowsky was selected as Atlantic Hockey's Player of the Year, named to the All-Atlantic Hockey First Team, and was a finalist for the Hobey Baker Award. He tallied 54 points in 40 games and led all Division I players with 729 face-off wins during the season.

=== Professional ===
After completing his collegiate career, Garbowsky agreed to a one-year contract with the Rochester Americans of the AHL for the 2015–16 season. He also signed a tryout contract with the Americans to be able to play in the remainder of the 2014–15 season, where he appeared in 8 games and recorded 1 point.

In his first full professional season, on October 6, 2015, Garbowsky was assigned to the Americans ECHL affiliate, the Elmira Jackals, training camp. On October 25, 2015, Garbowsky was recalled to the Amerks after playing in four games with the Jackals. Garbowsky appeared in 16 games over the course of the season in the AHL, however finished with 21 points in 33 games with the Jackals.

As a free agent in the off-season and unable to garner an AHL contract, Garbowsky opted to continue in the ECHL, signing a one-year deal with the Colorado Eagles, a secondary affiliate to the Colorado Avalanche, on August 16, 2016. He was named MVP of the ECHL All-Star Classic on January 18, 2017.

After two standout championship seasons with the Eagles, Garbowsky opted to sign his first contract abroad, agreeing to a one-year deal with the Graz 99ers of the Austrian Hockey League (EBEL) on June 21, 2018.

== Career statistics ==
			Regular season					Playoffs
Season	Team	League	GP	G	A	Pts	PIM	GP	G	A	Pts	PIM
2007–08	Brantford Golden Eagles	GOJHL	48	19	22	41	40	4	0	1	1	2
2008–09	Brantford Eagles	GOJHL	53	46	64	110	22	14	10	16	26	14
2009–10	Powell River Kings	BCHL	51	27	26	53	44	23	12	15	27	12
2010–11	Powell River Kings	BCHL	56	44	36	80	56	16	4	8	12	12
2011–12	R.I.T.	AHA	39	9	11	20	34	—	—	—	—	—
2012–13	R.I.T.	AHA	36	11	22	33	14	—	—	—	—	—
2013–14	R.I.T.	AHA	13	2	5	7	4	—	—	—	—	—
2014–15	R.I.T.	AHA	40	26	28	54	28	—	—	—	—	—
2014–15	Rochester Americans	AHL	8	0	1	1	0	—	—	—	—	—
2015–16	Elmira Jackals	ECHL	33	7	14	21	13	—	—	—	—	—
2015–16	Rochester Americans	AHL	16	0	1	1	0	—	—	—	—	—
2016–17	Colorado Eagles	ECHL	72	36	44	80	54	20	6	9	15	19
2017–18	Colorado Eagles	ECHL	51	15	39	54	43	24	7	9	16	24
2018–19	Graz 99ers	EBEL	54	19	21	40	26	10	2	4	6	4
2019–20	Graz99ers	EBEL	37	7	16	23	12	3	1	1	2	4
AHL totals			24	0	2	2	0	—	—	—	—	—

== Awards and honours ==
Award	Year
College
Atlantic Hockey Player of the Year	2014–15
All-Atlantic Hockey First Team	2014–15
Hobey Baker Award Finalist	2014–15
Atlantic Hockey All-Tournament Team	2015
ECHL
All-Star Classic MVP	2017
First All-Star Team	2017
Kelly Cup (Colorado Eagles)	2017, 2018

Awards and achievements
Preceded by Jimmy Sarjeant	Atlantic Hockey Player of the Year; 2014–15	Succeeded by Zac Lynch
Preceded by Dan O'Donoghue	Atlantic Hockey Best Defensive Forward; 2014–15	Succeeded by Ben Carey
Preceded by Brett Gensler	Atlantic Hockey Scoring Trophy; 2014–15	Succeeded by Zac Lynch
