= Ashton Rome =

Canadian ice hockey player (born 1985)

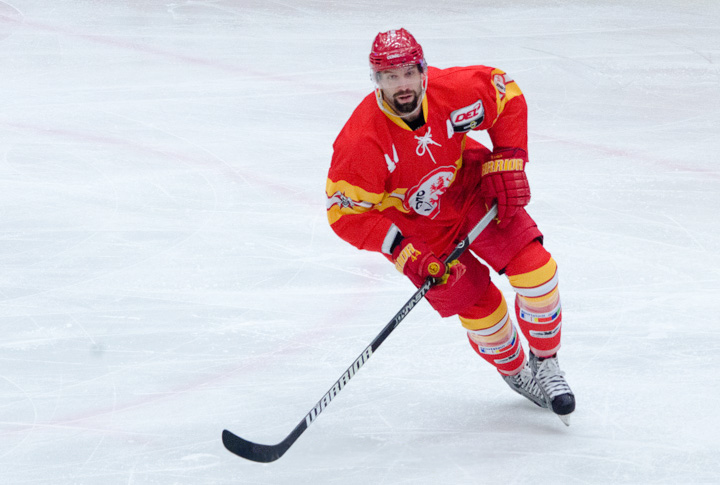
- Born: December 31, 1985 (age 39); Nesbitt, Manitoba, Canada
- Height: 6 ft 1 in (185 cm)
- Weight: 202 lb (92 kg; 14 st 6 lb)
- Position: Right wing
- Shot: Right
- Played for: Worcester Sharks; Toronto Marlies; Hershey Bears; Portland Pirates; Düsseldorfer EG; Schwenninger Wild Wings; Iserlohn Roosters
- NHL draft: 108th overall, 2004; Boston Bruins; 143rd overall, 2006; San Jose Sharks
- Playing career: 2006–2018

Ashton Rome (born December 31, 1985) is a Canadian former professional ice hockey winger, who most notably played with the Worcester Sharks in the American Hockey League (AHL).

== Playing career ==
Rome played his junior hockey in the Western Hockey League with the Moose Jaw Warriors, Red Deer Rebels and Kamloops Blazers. He was selected twice in the National Hockey League Entry Draft, initially by the Boston Bruins in 2004, and then by the San Jose Sharks in 2006. Rome captured the Calder Cup as the American Hockey League champions with the Hershey Bears for the 2009–10 season.

After his first two seasons in the German DEL with Düsseldorfer EG, Rome signed a one-year contract with fellow DEL club, Schwenninger Wild Wings on March 1, 2014. After spending a second year with the Schwenningen outfit, he signed with the Iserlohn Roosters of the DEL in April 2016. Rome parted company with the Roosters in the course of the 2016–17 season and signed in the ECHL with the Manchester Monarchs in December 2016. He played out the season with the Monarchs, collecting 12 goals and 18 points in 36 games.

On July 13, 2017, Rome returned to Worcester as a free agent, signing a one-year deal with inaugural club, the Worcester Railers, to continue in the ECHL. On March 5, 2018, Rome was traded back to the Manchester Monarchs for defenseman Justin Agosta.

Rome retired from professional hockey after a 12-year professional career at the conclusion of the 2017–18 season.

== Career statistics ==
| | | | Regular season | | | | | Playoffs |
| Season | Team | League | GP | G | A | Pts | PIM | GP | G | A | Pts | PIM |
|---|---|---|---|---|---|---|---|---|---|---|---|---|
| 2001–02 | Southwest Cougars AAA | MMHL | 39 | 15 | 24 | 39 | 91 | — | — | — | — | — |
| 2002–03 | Moose Jaw Warriors | WHL | 61 | 5 | 10 | 15 | 103 | 13 | 1 | 1 | 2 | 6 |
| 2003–04 | Moose Jaw Warriors | WHL | 72 | 15 | 22 | 37 | 139 | 10 | 6 | 2 | 8 | 18 |
| 2004–05 | Moose Jaw Warriors | WHL | 41 | 10 | 17 | 27 | 84 | — | — | — | — | — |
| 2004–05 | Red Deer Rebels | WHL | 31 | 9 | 10 | 19 | 39 | 7 | 3 | 1 | 4 | 14 |
| 2005–06 | Red Deer Rebels | WHL | 14 | 11 | 6 | 17 | 27 | — | — | — | — | — |
| 2005–06 | Kamloops Blazers | WHL | 51 | 19 | 28 | 47 | 103 | — | — | — | — | — |
| 2006–07 | Worcester Sharks | AHL | 65 | 8 | 3 | 11 | 63 | 6 | 1 | 0 | 1 | 2 |
| 2007–08 | Worcester Sharks | AHL | 60 | 7 | 8 | 15 | 49 | — | — | — | — | — |
| 2008–09 | Worcester Sharks | AHL | 3 | 0 | 0 | 0 | 2 | — | — | — | — | — |
| 2008–09 | Phoenix RoadRunners | ECHL | 52 | 25 | 19 | 44 | 118 | — | — | — | — | — |
| 2008–09 | Toronto Marlies | AHL | 6 | 0 | 1 | 1 | 2 | — | — | — | — | — |
| 2009–10 | Idaho Steelheads | ECHL | 39 | 17 | 19 | 36 | 107 | — | — | — | — | — |
| 2009–10 | Toronto Marlies | AHL | 21 | 3 | 5 | 8 | 12 | — | — | — | — | — |
| 2009–10 | Hershey Bears | AHL | 10 | 3 | 2 | 5 | 13 | 16 | 2 | 1 | 3 | 6 |
| 2010–11 | Hershey Bears | AHL | 63 | 8 | 11 | 19 | 41 | 4 | 0 | 0 | 0 | 2 |
| 2011–12 | Portland Pirates | AHL | 66 | 11 | 9 | 20 | 63 | — | — | — | — | — |
| 2012–13 | Greenville Road Warriors | ECHL | 5 | 0 | 0 | 0 | 4 | — | — | — | — | — |
| 2012–13 | Düsseldorfer EG | DEL | 33 | 13 | 12 | 25 | 95 | — | — | — | — | — |
| 2013–14 | Düsseldorfer EG | DEL | 33 | 14 | 9 | 23 | 74 | — | — | — | — | — |
| 2014–15 | Schwenninger Wild Wings | DEL | 45 | 11 | 13 | 24 | 99 | — | — | — | — | — |
| 2015–16 | Schwenninger Wild Wings | DEL | 38 | 17 | 15 | 32 | 54 | — | — | — | — | — |
| 2016–17 | Iserlohn Roosters | DEL | 9 | 0 | 3 | 3 | 10 | — | — | — | — | — |
| 2016–17 | Manchester Monarchs | ECHL | 36 | 12 | 6 | 18 | 59 | 19 | 9 | 3 | 12 | 17 |
| 2017–18 | Worcester Railers | ECHL | 30 | 6 | 10 | 16 | 41 | — | — | — | — | — |
| 2017–18 | Manchester Monarchs | ECHL | 11 | 2 | 2 | 4 | 56 | 6 | 0 | 1 | 1 | 24 |
| AHL totals | | | 326 | 45 | 43 | 88 | 264 | 26 | 3 | 1 | 4 | 10 |
| ECHL totals | | | 173 | 62 | 56 | 118 | 385 | 25 | 9 | 4 | 13 | 41 |
| DEL totals | | | 158 | 58 | 49 | 107 | 332 | — | — | — | — | — |
