= Rob Flick =

Canadian ice hockey player (born 1991)

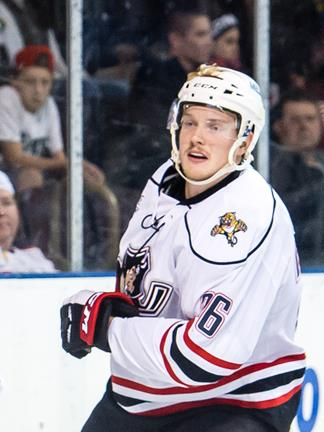
- Flick with the Portland Pirates in 2015
- Born: March 28, 1991 (age 35) London, Ontario, Canada
- Height: 6 ft 2 in (188 cm)
- Weight: 208 lb (94 kg; 14 st 12 lb)
- Position: Centre
- Shot: Left
- Played for: Rockford IceHogs; Providence Bruins; Portland Pirates; Manitoba Moose; EC VSV; HKM Zvolen; Eispiraten Crimmitschau; Orli Znojmo; DVTK Jegesmedvék; HC Vítkovice Ridera; HK Dukla Trenčín
- NHL draft: 120th overall, 2010; Chicago Blackhawks
- Playing career: 2011–2024

Rob Flick (born March 28, 1991) is a Canadian former professional ice hockey centre.

Flick was selected by the Chicago Blackhawks in the 4th round (120th overall) of the 2010 NHL entry draft.

== Playing career ==
Flick played three seasons (2008–2011) of major junior hockey in the Ontario Hockey League (OHL) with the Mississauga St. Michael's Majors where he scored 46 goals and 53 assists in 181 games played. In 2010 and 2011 Flick led the Mississauga team with 157 and 167 penalty minutes, respectively.

Flick made his professional debut in the American Hockey League with the Rockford Ice Hogs on October 8, 2011.

On April 3, 2013, the Chicago Blackhawks traded Flick to the Boston Bruins in exchange for Maxime Sauvé. He was immediately assigned to the Bruins namesake AHL affiliate in Providence.

On July 2, 2015, after three seasons within the Bruins organization, Flick left as a free agent to sign a one-year, two-way contract with the Florida Panthers. He spent the duration of the 2015–16 season, with the Panthers AHL affiliate, the Portland Pirates, recording 21 points in 60 games.

As a free agent for a second consecutive season, Flick was unable to obtain an NHL offer, opting to continue his professional career in the ECHL with the South Carolina Stingrays on a one-year deal on August 31, 2016.

In the 2018-19 season he signed a contract with the German second league team Eispiraten Crimmitschau. He led his team in scoring and was a top 3 goal-scorer (34 goals) from the DEL2.

For the 2019-20 season he started with a PTO with the DEL2-Champion Ravensburg Towerstars and changed in November 2019 in the Austrian Hockey League to the Czechs team Orli Znojmo.

== Career statistics ==
			Regular season					Playoffs
Season	Team	League	GP	G	A	Pts	PIM	GP	G	A	Pts	PIM
2008–09	Mississauga St. Michael's Majors	OHL	48	4	4	8	69	10	1	1	2	14
2009–10	Mississauga St. Michael's Majors	OHL	65	15	19	34	157	16	2	2	4	44
2010–11	Mississauga St. Michael's Majors	OHL	68	27	30	57	167	20	8	8	16	34
2011–12	Rockford IceHogs	AHL	45	7	6	13	91	–	—	—	—	—
2011–12	Toledo Walleye	ECHL	17	4	6	10	43	–	—	—	—	—
2012–13	Rockford IceHogs	AHL	51	3	2	5	97	–	—	—	—	—
2012–13	Providence Bruins	AHL	5	0	0	0	7	–	—	—	—	—
2013–14	Providence Bruins	AHL	53	2	5	7	92	–	—	—	—	—
2014–15	Providence Bruins	AHL	65	19	5	24	77	5	0	0	0	8
2015–16	Portland Pirates	AHL	60	7	14	21	75	5	1	1	2	10
2016–17	South Carolina Stingrays	ECHL	60	31	32	63	160	22	11	11	22	51
2016–17	Manitoba Moose	AHL	5	1	0	1	7	–	—	—	—	—
2017–18	EC VSV	EBEL	40	7	16	23	33	–	—	—	—	—
2017–18	HKM Zvolen	Slovak	10	4	3	7	31	5	0	0	0	41
2018–19	Eispiraten Crimmitschau	DEL2	52	34	27	61	98	8	2	1	3	18
2019–20	Ravensburg Towerstars	DEL2	9	6	1	7	6	–	—	—	—	—
2019–20	Orli Znojmo	EBEL	34	16	22	38	28	3	0	1	1	2
2020–21	DVTK Jegesmedvék	Slovak	22	10	2	12	50	–	—	—	—	—
2020–21	HC Vítkovice Ridera	Czech	15	2	5	7	6	5	0	1	1	4
2021–22	HC Vítkovice Ridera	Czech	37	6	5	11	60	7	2	1	3	6
2022–23	HK Dukla Trenčín	Slovak	42	10	14	24	79	1	0	0	0	2
AHL totals			284	39	32	71	446	10	1	1	2	18
