= Brendan O'Donnell =

Canadian ice hockey player (born 1992)

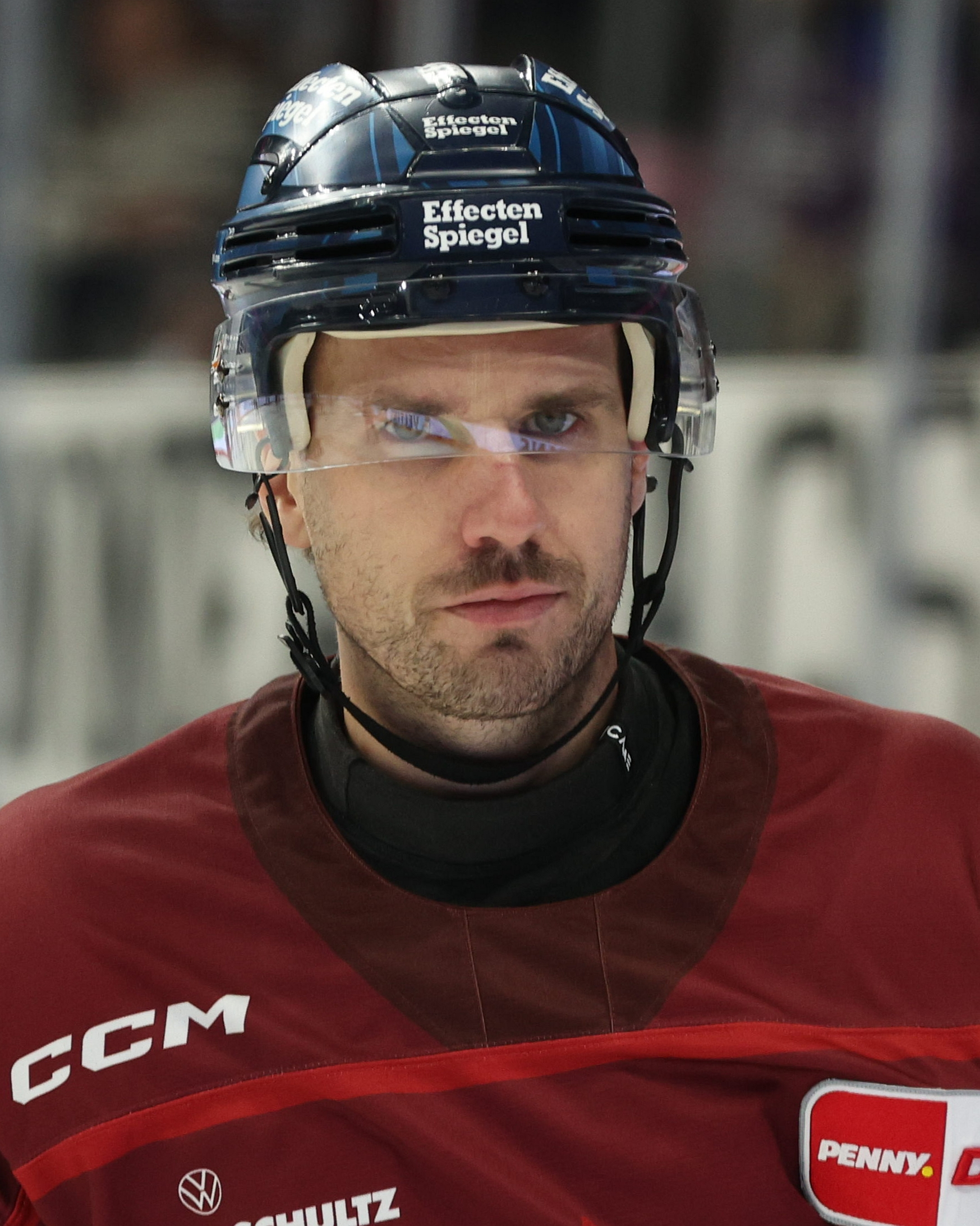
- Brendan O'Donnell in 2024
- Born: June 25, 1992 (age 34) Winnipeg, Manitoba, Canada
- Height: 6 ft 2 in (188 cm)
- Weight: 192 lb (87 kg; 13 st 10 lb)
- Position: Forward
- Shoots: Left
- DEL team Former teams: Adler Mannheim; Florida Everblades; Texas Stars; Kunlun Red Star; KooKoo; Dornbirn Bulldogs; Rytíři Kladno; HC Slovan Bratislava; Düsseldorfer EG; HC Kometa Brno
- NHL draft: 156th overall, 2010; Tampa Bay Lightning
- Playing career: 2015–present

Brendan O’Donnell (born June 25, 1992) is a Canadian professional ice hockey forward who currently plays for Adler Mannheim in the Deutsche Eishockey Liga (DEL).

== Playing career ==
Selected 156th overall by the Tampa Bay Lightning in the 2010 NHL entry draft, O'Donnell went on to play four seasons with the University of North Dakota Fighting Hawks before signing with the ECHL's Florida Everblades on October 8, 2015. In his second year with the team, he delivered an impressive performance, scoring 41 goals and totaling 80 points across 61 games. He also made a brief appearance in the AHL, suiting up for six games with the Texas Stars in 2017.

O'Donnell next joined Kunlun Red Star, a Chinese team in the Kontinental Hockey League, where he appeared in 25 games and recorded two assists. On August 19, 2018, he signed with KooKoo of Finland's Liiga but played only three games before leaving after two months to join the Dornbirn Bulldogs in the Erste Bank Eishockey Liga, where he tallied an impressive 33 goals in 43 games

On June 28, 2019, O'Donnell signed a contract with Rytíři Kladno, a team competing in the Czech Republic's top-tier professional league, the Czech Extraliga. During the 2019–20 season, O'Donnell played an integral role on the team's offence, registering 14 goals throughout 51 games. Despite his contributions, Rytíři Kladno struggled in the standings and ultimately faced relegation to the second-tier Chance Liga after the season. Seeking to continue competing at a high level, O'Donnell signed with HC Slovan Bratislava of Slovakia's top professional league, the Tipos Extraliga, on August 3, 2020.

== Career statistics ==
			Regular season					Playoffs
Season	Team	League	GP	G	A	Pts	PIM	GP	G	A	Pts	PIM
2007–08	Winnipeg Wild	MMHL	40	17	27	44	12	8	1	3	4	10
2008–09	Winnipeg Wild	MMHL	38	38	45	83	4	10	10	10	20	10
2008–09	Winnipeg South Blues	MJHL	4	1	2	3	2	—	—	—	—	—
2009–10	Winnipeg South Blues	MJHL	53	29	32	61	55	4	2	1	3	4
2010–11	Penticton Vees	BCHL	58	29	43	72	28	6	1	5	6	9
2011–12	U. of North Dakota	WCHA	17	5	1	6	0	—	—	—	—	—
2012–13	U. of North Dakota	WCHA	29	2	8	10	20	—	—	—	—	—
2013–14	U. of North Dakota	NCHC	35	7	11	18	10	—	—	—	—	—
2014–15	U. of North Dakota	NCHC	40	13	8	21	35	—	—	—	—	—
2015–16	Florida Everblades	ECHL	53	17	20	37	25	6	3	2	5	6
2016–17	Florida Everblades	ECHL	61	41	39	80	39	12	8	5	13	8
2016–17	Texas Stars	AHL	6	0	0	0	0	—	—	—	—	—
2017–18	Kunlun Red Star	KHL	25	0	2	2	2	—	—	—	—	—
2017–18	KRS Heilongjiang	VHL	13	3	10	13	53	—	—	—	—	—
2018–19	KooKoo	Liiga	3	0	0	0	0	—	—	—	—	—
2018–19	Dornbirn Bulldogs	EBEL	43	33	20	53	52	—	—	—	—	—
2019–20	Rytíři Kladno	ELH	51	14	16	30	12	—	—	—	—	—
2020–21	HC Slovan Bratislava	Slovak	47	22	19	41	18	10	4	6	10	4
2021–22	Düsseldorfer EG	DEL	56	22	31	53	10	7	1	5	6	4
2022–23	Düsseldorfer EG	DEL	12	6	8	14	2	—	—	—	—	—
2023–24	Düsseldorfer EG	DEL	34	20	17	37	16	—	—	—	—	—
2024–25	Düsseldorfer EG	DEL	52	20	28	48	38	—	—	—	—	—
KHL totals			25	0	2	2	2	—	—	—	—	—
Liiga totals			3	0	0	0	0	—	—	—	—	—
