= Mark Dekanich =

- Born: May 10, 1986 (age 40) North Vancouver, British Columbia, Canada
- Height: 6 ft 2 in (188 cm)
- Weight: 192 lb (87 kg; 13 st 10 lb)
- Position: Goaltender
- Caught: Left
- Played for: Nashville Predators; KHL Medveščak Zagreb
- National team: Croatia
- NHL draft: 146th overall, 2006; Nashville Predators
- Playing career: 2008–2018

Mark Adam Dekanich (born May 10, 1986) is a Croatian former professional ice hockey goaltender. He was selected by the Nashville Predators in the fifth round (146th overall) of the 2006 NHL entry draft.

== Playing career ==
As a youth, Dekanich played in the 2000 Quebec International Pee-Wee Hockey Tournament with a minor ice hockey team from Burnaby. He later played four years of collegiate hockey at Colgate University.

During his sophomore season at Colgate, Dekanich started 36 of Colgate’s 39 games where he set a then-school-record of 988 saves. He ranked first in the ECACHL conference for the 2005–06 season with a .924 save percentage and was subsequently named to the all-ECAC first team and won the Ken Dryden Award as the ECAC Goaltender of the Year.

In his junior season, Dekanich started 36 of Colgate’s 40 games where he broke his single-season saves record with .993. Although his postseason ended early due to injury, he was selected to the all-ECAC second team and ECAC all-academic team.

As a senior during the 2007–08 season, he was named to the Lowe's Senior CLASS All-Senior All-America first team and Selected to the all-ECAC Hockey third team. At the conclusion of the season he signed an entry-level contract with the Nashville Predators.

On December 3, 2010, the Nashville Predators called Dekanich up from the Milwaukee Admirals, however he did not make his NHL debut until December 18, 2010 when he played 50 minutes against the Los Angeles Kings in relief of the Predators' starter Anders Lindbäck.

On July 3, 2011, Dekanich was signed as a free agent by the Columbus Blue Jackets. However, he missed the majority of the 2011–12 season recovering from reconstructive ankle surgery. On July 6, 2012, Dekanich left the Blue Jackets organization and signed as a free agent to a one-year, contract with the Winnipeg Jets.

On May 20, 2013, Dekanich signed his first European contract with Croatian team KHL Medveščak, which competed in the KHL for the 2013–14 season.

After two seasons in Zagreb, Dekanich returned to North America, signing a one-year ECHL contract with the South Carolina Stingrays on September 10, 2015. He was invited to AHL affiliate, the Hershey Bears, training camp prior to the 2015–16 season, and was signed to an AHL contract with the club before he was returned to the Stingrays on October 15, 2015.

On August 18, 2016, Dekanich signed an AHL contract with the Lehigh Valley Phantoms. He most recently played for the Reading Royals of the ECHL. In November 2018, Dekanich announced his retirement on Twitter.

He currently runs his own strength and conditioning business by the name of Dexshow High Performance.

== Records ==
Dekanich currently holds the Milwaukee Admirals single season records in both save percentage (0.931) and goals against average (2.02).

== Career statistics ==
=== Regular season and playoffs ===
			Regular season									Playoffs
Season	Team	League	GP	W	L	T/OT	MIN	GA	SO	GAA	SV%	GP	W	L	MIN	GA	SO	GAA	SV%
2002–03	Coquitlam Express	BCHL	20	3	11	0	1059	83	0	4.70	.874	—	—	—	—	—	—	—	—
2003–04	Coquitlam Express	BCHL	30	13	15	1	1647	89	2	3.24	.909	—	—	—	—	—	—	—	—
2004–05	Colgate University	ECAC	5	1	1	0	161	5	0	1.85	.904	—	—	—	—	—	—	—	—
2005–06	Colgate University	ECAC	36	18	11	6	2126	81	4	2.29	.924	—	—	—	—	—	—	—	—
2006–07	Colgate University	ECAC	36	15	17	4	2136	83	1	2.33	.923	—	—	—	—	—	—	—	—
2007–08	Colgate University	ECAC	41	18	16	6	2389	86	6	2.16	.924	—	—	—	—	—	—	—	—
2008–09	Milwaukee Admirals	AHL	30	15	10	2	1663	58	1	2.09	.923	—	—	—	—	—	—	—	—
2009–10	Milwaukee Admirals	AHL	49	27	16	0	2804	109	4	2.33	.914	7	3	4	408	19	1	2.79	.909
2009–10	Cincinnati Cyclones	ECHL	2	2	0	0	125	1	1	0.48	.981	—	—	—	—	—	—	—	—
2010–11	Milwaukee Admirals	AHL	43	23	13	5	2500	84	4	2.02	.931	—	—	—	—	—	—	—	—
2010–11	Nashville Predators	NHL	1	0	0	0	50	3	0	3.60	.880	—	—	—	—	—	—	—	—
2011–12	Springfield Falcons	AHL	5	1	2	1	240	16	0	4.00	.867	—	—	—	—	—	—	—	—
2012–13	St. John's IceCaps	AHL	35	16	14	1	1914	95	2	2.98	.895	—	—	—	—	—	—	—	—
2013–14	KHL Medveščak Zagreb	KHL	27	11	9	6	1630	58	3	2.13	.936	2	0	2	118	7	0	3.57	.890
2014–15	KHL Medveščak Zagreb	KHL	12	0	10	0	591	47	0	4.76	.838	—	—	—	—	—	—	—	—
2015–16	South Carolina Stingrays	ECHL	35	20	9	4	2004	72	2	2.16	.925	10	5	4	603	17	2	1.69	.922
2015–16	Hershey Bears	AHL	1	0	1	0	59	4	0	4.09	.818	—	—	—	—	—	—	—	—
2016–17	Reading Royals	ECHL	39	21	12	1	2189	111	1	3.04	.910	6	2	2	406	11	0	1.62	.954
2016–17	Lehigh Valley Phantoms	AHL	1	0	0	0	33	5	0	9.10	.839	—	—	—	—	—	—	—	—
2017–18	Reading Royals	ECHL	34	13	15	0	1975	101	3	3.07	.906	—	—	—	—	—	—	—	—
NHL totals			1	0	0	0	50	3	0	3.60	.880	—	—	—	—	—	—	—	—

== Awards and honours ==
Award	Year
College
All-ECAC Hockey First Team	2006
Ken Dryden Award	2006
All-ECAC Hockey Second Team	2007
All-ECAC Hockey Third Team	2008
