= 2016–17 ECHL season =

Ice hockey league season

- League: ECHL
- Sport: Ice hockey
- Duration: October 14, 2016 – April 9, 2017
- Number of teams: 27

Regular season
- Brabham Cup: Toledo Walleye
- Season MVP: Chad Costello (Allen)
- Top scorer: Chad Costello (Allen)

Playoffs
- Eastern champions: South Carolina Stingrays
- Eastern runners-up: Manchester Monarchs
- Western champions: Colorado Eagles
- Western runners-up: Toledo Walleye
- Playoffs MVP: Matt Register (Colorado)

Kelly Cup
- Champions: Colorado Eagles
- Runners-up: South Carolina Stingrays

ECHL seasons
- ← 2015–16 2017–18 →

The 2016–17 ECHL season was the 29th season of the ECHL. The regular season schedule ran from October 14, 2016 to April 9, 2017, with the Kelly Cup playoffs following. Twenty-seven teams in 21 states and one Canadian province each played a 72-game schedule.

== League business ==
=== Team changes ===
- The Evansville IceMen voluntarily suspended operations for the 2016–17 season. The IceMen franchise was approved for relocation to Owensboro, Kentucky, following arena issues in Evansville but would have needed at least a year to finish renovations to the Owensboro Sportscenter. However, the IceMen's deal to move into the Sportscenter fell through in September 2016. In January 2017, various media sources reported that the franchise had been sold to an ownership group based out of Jacksonville, Florida, and was approved by the league on February 8. The team returned in 2017–18 as the Jacksonville Icemen.

=== Conference realignment ===
The ECHL returned to a four division alignment for the 2016–17 season with the removal of the East and Midwest Divisions. Two teams, the Kalamazoo Wings and Toledo Walleye, were moved from the Eastern to the Western Conference and the Cincinnati Cyclones were moved to the Eastern Conference. The West Division was also renamed the Mountain Division while adding the Allen Americans and Missouri Mavericks. The Central Division added the Fort Wayne Komets, Indy Fuel, Kalamazoo Wings, Quad City Mallards, and Toledo Walleye. The South Division added Cincinnati and the Norfolk Admirals. The North Division added the former East Division, except Norfolk.

Due to the season schedule being set in May 2016 and the realignment announced after the July Board of Governors meetings, the new alignment had several divisional scheduling oddities. One of the most egregious examples being Cincinnati having more games against Western Conference teams than in their own Eastern Conference and would not even play inter-divisional members Florida, Norfolk, and Orlando during the regular season.

=== Affiliation changes ===
ECHL team	New affiliates	Former affiliates
Alaska Aces	Vancouver Canucks (NHL); Utica Comets (AHL)	Independent
Colorado Eagles	Colorado Avalanche (NHL); San Antonio Rampage (AHL)	Independent
Fort Wayne Komets	Independent	Colorado Avalanche (NHL); San Antonio Rampage (AHL)
Kalamazoo Wings	Tampa Bay Lightning (NHL); Syracuse Crunch (AHL)	Columbus Blue Jackets (NHL); Lake Erie Monsters (AHL)
Rapid City Rush	Tucson Roadrunners (AHL)	Springfield Falcons (AHL)
Wichita Thunder	Ottawa Senators (NHL); Binghamton Senators (AHL)	Independent

=== Annual Board of Governors meeting ===
The annual ECHL Board of Governors meeting was held at the Monte Carlo Resort and Casino in Las Vegas, Nevada, in July 2016. The ECHL Board of Governors unanimously re-elected Cincinnati Cyclones' president Ray Harris as chairman for a second season. The Board also approved of the rule change for no timeouts allowed following an icing penalty, a rule that had also been approved by the American Hockey League.

=== All-star game ===
The 2017 CCM/ECHL All-Star Classic was held on January 18, 2017, at the Glens Falls Civic Center in Glens Falls, New York. The event featured the ECHL All-Stars playing against the host Adirondack Thunder. The format for the match consisted of two 25-minute halves with a skills competition during the intermission. The skills competition had a fastest skater, a hardest shot, and a puck skills relay. The first half of the game was played under the standard 5-on-5 player rules while the second half was ten minutes of 5-on-5, five minutes of 4-on-4, and finished with 3-on-3 player hockey. Both goals scored during play and points made during the skills competition counted towards the final score of All-Star Classic.

The ECHL All Stars defeated the Thunder 8–7. Matt Garbowsky of the Colorado Eagles was named the All-star game Most Valuable Player. Steven McParland of the South Carolina Stingrays won the fastest skater competition. Stepan Falkovsky of the Adirondack Thunder won the hardest shot competition with a shot measuring at 99 miles per hour. The Adirondack Thunder won the puck relay competition.

== Standings ==
Final standings.

Eastern Conference

North Division	GP	W	L	OTL	SOL	GF	GA	PTS
y – Adirondack Thunder (CGY)	72	41	20	7	4	266	218	93
x – Reading Royals (PHI)	72	41	25	4	2	255	217	88
x – Brampton Beast (MTL)	72	40	24	3	5	263	256	88
x – Manchester Monarchs (LA)	72	37	24	7	4	264	252	85
Wheeling Nailers (PIT)	72	34	30	8	0	244	239	76
Elmira Jackals (BUF)	72	17	47	7	1	171	279	42

South Division	GP	W	L	OTL	SOL	GF	GA	PTS
y – Florida Everblades (CAR)	72	46	21	2	3	275	219	97
x – Greenville Swamp Rabbits (NYR)	72	40	26	5	1	251	252	86
x – South Carolina Stingrays (WSH)	72	40	28	3	1	227	211	84
x – Orlando Solar Bears (TOR)	72	36	26	7	3	260	258	82
Cincinnati Cyclones (NSH)	72	36	29	6	1	200	209	79
Atlanta Gladiators (BOS)	72	27	37	6	2	234	278	62
Norfolk Admirals (EDM)	72	26	40	6	0	214	271	58

Western Conference

Central Division	GP	W	L	OTL	SOL	GF	GA	PTS
z — Toledo Walleye (DET)	72	51	17	2	2	302	191	106
x — Fort Wayne Komets (Ind.)	72	45	19	6	2	264	210	98
x — Quad City Mallards (MIN)	72	40	28	2	2	232	220	84
x – Kalamazoo Wings (TB)	72	38	30	1	3	222	237	80
Tulsa Oilers (WPG)	72	27	37	6	2	194	241	62
Indy Fuel (CHI)	72	23	42	3	4	196	290	53
Wichita Thunder (OTT)	72	21	44	6	1	189	278	49

Mountain Division	GP	W	L	OTL	SOL	GF	GA	PTS
y – Allen Americans (SJ)	72	49	17	4	2	294	203	104
x – Colorado Eagles (COL)	72	47	20	2	3	265	206	99
x – Idaho Steelheads (DAL)	72	43	22	5	2	234	206	93
x – Utah Grizzlies (ANA)	72	36	29	5	2	225	240	79
Missouri Mavericks (NYI)	72	33	30	4	5	233	241	75
Alaska Aces (VAN)	72	32	30	3	7	219	230	74
Rapid City Rush (ARZ)	72	26	38	8	0	215	256	60

x – clinched playoff spot, y – clinched regular season division title, z – Brabham Cup (regular season) champion

== Postseason ==
=== 2017 Kelly Cup playoffs format ===
At the end of the regular season the top four teams in each division qualifies for the 2017 Kelly Cup playoffs and be seeded one through four based on highest point total earned in the season. Then the first two rounds of the playoffs are held within the division with the first seed facing the fourth seed and the second seed facing the third. The division champions then play each other in a conference championship. The Kelly Cup finals pits the Eastern Conference champion against the Western Conference champion. All four rounds are a best-of-seven format.

=== Bracket ===
Division semifinals	Division finals
N1	Adirondack Thunder	2
N4	Manchester Monarchs	4
N4	Manchester	4
North Division
N3	Brampton	2
N2	Reading Royals	2
N3	Brampton Beast	4
Eastern Conference
S1	Florida Everblades	4
S4	Orlando Solar Bears	3
S1	Florida	1
South Division
S3	South Carolina	4
S2	Greenville Swamp Rabbits	2
S3	South Carolina Stingrays	4
C1	Toledo Walleye	4
C4	Kalamazoo Wings	3
C1	Toledo	4
Central Division
C2	Fort Wayne	1
C2	Fort Wayne Komets	4
C3	Quad City Mallards	1
Western Conference
M1	Allen Americans	4
M4	Utah Grizzlies	1
M1	Allen	2
Mountain Division
M2	Colorado	4
M2	Colorado Eagles	4
M3	Idaho Steelheads	1

Conference finals
N4	Manchester	3
S3	South Carolina	4
C1	Toledo	1
M2	Colorado	4

Kelly Cup finals
S3	South Carolina	0
M2	Colorado	4

== Awards ==
Award	Winner
Patrick Kelly Cup:	Colorado Eagles
Henry Brabham Cup:	Toledo Walleye
Gingher Memorial Trophy:	South Carolina Stingrays
Bruce Taylor Trophy:	Colorado Eagles
John Brophy Award:	Dan Watson, Toledo Walleye
CCM Most Valuable Player:	Chad Costello, Allen Americans
Kelly Cup Playoffs Most Valuable Player:	Matt Register, Colorado Eagles
Warrior Hockey Goaltender of the Year:	Riley Gill, Allen Americans
CCM Rookie of the Year:	Tyson Spink, Toledo Walleye
CCM Defenseman of the Year:	Matt Register, Colorado Eagles
Leading Scorer:	Chad Costello, Allen Americans
AMI Graphics Plus Performer Award:	Joel Chouinard, Allen Americans
Sportsmanship Award:	Shane Berschbach, Toledo Walleye
Community Service Award:	Mike Embach, Fort Wayne Komets
Birmingham Memorial Award:	Scott DeBaugh

=== All-ECHL teams ===
All-First Team

- Riley Gill (G) – Allen Americans
- David Makowski (D) – Allen Americans
- Matt Register (D) – Colorado Eagles
- Chad Costello (F) – Allen Americans
- Matt Garbowsky (F) – Colorado Eagles
- Casey Pierro-Zabotel (F) – Colorado Eagles

All-Second Team

- Jake Paterson (G) – Toledo Walleye
- Jake Marto (D) – Colorado Eagles
- Kevin Schulze (D) – Wheeling Nailers
- Shane Berschbach (F) – Toledo Walleye
- Brendan O'Donnell (F) – Florida Everblades
- David Vallorani (F) – Brampton Beast

All-Rookie Team

- Landon Bow (G) – Idaho Steelheads
- Kevin Schulze (D) – Wheeling Nailers
- Nolan Zajac (D) – Toledo Walleye
- Mike Cazzola (F) – Fort Wayne Komets
- Tylor Spink (F) – Toledo Walleye
- Tyson Spink (F) – Toledo Walleye

== See also ==
- List of ECHL seasons
- 2016 in sports
- 2017 in sports
