= 2025 Kelly Cup playoffs =

American ice hockey postseason

Tournament details
- Dates: April 16 – June 7
- Teams: 16

Final positions
- Champions: Trois-Rivières Lions
- Runners-up: Toledo Walleye

The 2025 Kelly Cup playoffs of the ECHL hockey league began on April 16, 2025, following the conclusion of the 2024–25 ECHL regular season and ended on June 7 with the Trois-Rivières Lions winning their first Kelly Cup championship over the Toledo Walleye in five games.

== Playoff format ==
Since all 29 teams were able to complete all 72 games this season, the league went back to the points system, instead of the point percentage that was used the year prior. The top 4 teams in each division qualified for the playoffs based on highest point total earned in the season. The first two rounds of the playoffs are held within the division with the first seed facing the fourth seed and the second seed facing the third. The division champions then play each other in a conference championship. The Kelly Cup finals pits the Eastern Conference champion against the Western Conference champion. All four rounds are a best-of-seven format. The South Carolina Stingrays secured the top record, winning the Brabham Cup, and therefore scheduled to have home ice advantage for all the rounds they advance in.

Nine out of the 16 teams in this year's playoffs were participants in the previous Kelly Cup Playoffs.

== Playoff seeds ==
After the regular season, 16 teams qualified for the playoffs.

Final seeds and points:

=== Eastern Conference ===
==== North Division ====
- Trois-Rivières Lions – Division champions, 98 points
- Wheeling Nailers – 90 points
- Norfolk Admirals – 87 points
- Reading Royals – 77 points

==== South Division ====
- South Carolina Stingrays – Brabham Cup winners, Division champions, 109 points
- Florida Everblades – 106 points
- Jacksonville Icemen – 92 points
- Orlando Solar Bears – 84 points

=== Western Conference ===
==== Central Division ====
- Toledo Walleye – Division champions, 99 points
- Fort Wayne Komets – 91 points
- Iowa Heartlanders – 83 points
- Indy Fuel – 74 points

==== Mountain Division ====
- Kansas City Mavericks – Division champions, 103 points
- Wichita Thunder – 89 points
- Tahoe Knight Monsters – 88 points
- Tulsa Oilers – 88 points

== Playoff bracket ==
Division Semifinals	Division Finals
N1	Trois-Rivières	4
N4	Reading	0
N1	Trois-Rivières	4
North Division
N3	Norfolk	2
N2	Wheeling	1
N3	Norfolk	4
Eastern Conference
S1	South Carolina	3
S4	Orlando	4
S2	Florida	4
South Division
S4	Orlando	1
S2	Florida	4
S3	Jacksonville	0
C1	Toledo	4
C4	Indy	0
C1	Toledo	4
Central Division
C2	Fort Wayne	2
C2	Fort Wayne	4
C3	Iowa	3
Western Conference
M1	Kansas City	4
M4	Tulsa	2
M1	Kansas City	4
Mountain Division
M3	Tahoe	0
M2	Wichita	0
M3	Tahoe	4

Conference Final
N1	Trois-Rivières	4
S2	Florida	2
C1	Toledo	4
M1	Kansas City	1

Kelly Cup Finals
N1	Trois-Rivières	4
C1	Toledo	1

== Division semifinals ==
Note: All times listed are in EDT (UTC−4).

=== North Division ===
==== (1) Trois-Rivières Lions vs. (4) Reading Royals ====
April 18	Reading Royals	2–4	Trois-Rivières Lions	Colisée Vidéotron	Recap
Mason Primeau (1) – 16:54		First period	4:02 – pp – Jakov Novak (1)
Cam Cook (1) – 3:54		Second period	8:29 – Alex Beaucage (1)
No scoring		Third period	1:30 – Justin Ducharme (1); 19:16 – en – Alex Beaucage (2)
Keith Petruzzelli 33 saves / 36 shots		Goalie stats	Luke Cavallin 28 saves / 30 shots

April 19	Reading Royals	1–5	Trois-Rivières Lions	Colisée Vidéotron	Recap
No scoring		First period	2:28 – Anthony Beauregard (1); 5:45 – Alex Beaucage (3)
Sam Sedley (1) – 1:52		Second period	0:13 – Jakov Novak (2); 4:12 – pp – Nicolas Guay (1)
No scoring		Third period	16:35 – sh-en – Logan Nijhoff (1)
Keith Petruzzelli 33 saves / 37 shots		Goalie stats	Luke Cavallin 26 saves / 27 shots

April 21	Trois-Rivières Lions	3–2	2OT	Reading Royals	Santander Arena	Recap
Nicolas Guay (2) – 6:15		First period		15:17 – Shane Sellar (1)
No scoring		Second period		No scoring
Anthony Beauregard (2) – 19:58		Third period		19:00 – Mason Primeau (2)
Andrew Coxhead (1) – 4:44		Second overtime period		No scoring
Luke Cavallin 42 saves / 44 shots		Goalie stats		Vinnie Purpura 33 saves / 36 shots

April 23	Trois-Rivières Lions	5–2	Reading Royals	Santander Arena	Recap
Alex Beaucage (4) – pp – 2:30; Morgan Adams-Moisan (1) – 8:40		First period	5:01 – pp – Mason Primeau (3)
No scoring		Second period	3:32 – Shane Sellar (2)
Vincent Sévigny (1) – 15:22; Nicolas Guay (3) – en – 18:12; Logan Nijhoff (2) – en – 19:40		Third period	No scoring
Luke Cavallin 24 saves / 26 shots		Goalie stats	Keith Petruzzelli 30 saves / 33 shots

Trois-Rivières won series 4–0

==== (2) Wheeling Nailers vs. (3) Norfolk Admirals ====
April 16	Wheeling Nailers	0–4	Norfolk Admirals	Norfolk Scope	Recap
No scoring		First period	5:44 – Darick Louis-Jean (1); 13:58 – Brady Fleurent (1)
No scoring		Second period	No scoring
No scoring		Third period	3:41 – Grant Hebert (1); 19:21 – en – Jack O'Leary (1)
Sergei Murashov 25 saves / 28 shots		Goalie stats	Thomas Milic 29 saves / 29 shots

April 17	Wheeling Nailers	0–4	Norfolk Admirals	Norfolk Scope	Recap
No scoring		First period	0:35 – Darick Louis-Jean (2); 14:53 – Ben Zloty (1)
No scoring		Second period	7:33 – pp – Denis Smirnov (1)
No scoring		Third period	14:33 – Sean Montgomery (1)
Sergei Murashov 24 saves / 28 shots		Goalie stats	Thomas Milic 33 saves / 33 shots

April 23	Norfolk Admirals	5–1	Wheeling Nailers	WesBanco Arena	Recap
No scoring		First period	No scoring
Denis Smirnov (2) – 8:49; Sean Montgomery (2) – 11:11; Ryan Chyzowski (1) – 17:37		Second period	15:16 – sh – Matt Koopman (1)
Colton Young (1) – 7:00; Bryce Brodzinski (1) – en – 18:57		Third period	No scoring
Thomas Milic 36 saves / 37 shots		Goalie stats	Sergei Murashov 17 saves / 21 shots

April 25	Norfolk Admirals	1–4	Wheeling Nailers	WesBanco Arena	Recap
Ryan Chyzowski (2) – 2:47		First period	2:05 – Matty De St. Phalle (1); 18:38 – Cole Tymkin (1)
No scoring		Second period	No scoring
No scoring		Third period	8:24 – pp – Matty De St. Phalle (2); 10:07 – Eli Lieffers (1)
Thomas Milic 25 saves / 29 shots		Goalie stats	Jaxon Castor 29 saves / 30 shots

April 26	Norfolk Admirals	5–2	Wheeling Nailers	WesBanco Arena	Recap
Denis Smirnov (3) – pp – 3:07; Brandon Osmundson (1) – 4:00		First period	9:03 – David Jankowski (1)
No scoring		Second period	No scoring
Colton Young (2) – 2:41; Colton Young (3) – 12:43; Darick Louis-Jean (3) – pp – 17:20		Third period	10:42 – Jack Beck (1)
Domenic DiVincentiis 29 saves / 31 shots		Goalie stats	Taylor Gauthier 21 saves / 26 shots

Norfolk won series 4–1

=== South Division ===
==== (1) South Carolina Stingrays vs. (4) Orlando Solar Bears ====
April 18	Orlando Solar Bears	3–5	South Carolina Stingrays	North Charleston Coliseum	Recap
No scoring		First period	6:30 – Connor Moore (1)
Aaron Luchuk (1) – pp – 12:40		Second period	2:45 – Jayden Lee (1); 14:37 – Ryan Hofer (1)
Jack Adams (1) – 5:29; Anthony Bardaro (1) – 6:00		Third period	6:46 – Charlie Combs (1); 14:30 – Ryan Hofer (2)
Jon Gillies 33 saves / 38 shots		Goalie stats	Garin Bjorklund 19 saves / 22 shots

April 19	Orlando Solar Bears	3–4	OT	South Carolina Stingrays	North Charleston Coliseum	Recap
No scoring		First period		No scoring
No scoring		Second period		3:04 – Josh Wilkins (1); 15:03 – Josh Wilkins (2)
Jaydon Dureau (1) – pp – 6:09; Aaron Luchuk (2) – 18:15; Spencer Kersten (1) – 18:52		Third period		14:20 – pp – Josh Wilkins (3)
No scoring		First overtime period		2:06 – Alexander Suzdalev (1)
Jon Gillies 36 saves / 40 shots		Goalie stats		Mitchell Gibson 15 saves / 18 shots

April 21	South Carolina Stingrays	2–4	Orlando Solar Bears	Kia Center	Recap
No scoring		First period	15:27 – Brayden Low (1); 18:01 – sh – Tyler Bird (1)
No scoring		Second period	No scoring
Dean Loukus (1) – 13:36; Josh Wilkins (4) – 17:00		Third period	6:46 – Tyler Bird (2); 19:04 – en – Tyler Bird (3)
Mitchell Gibson 29 saves / 32 shots		Goalie stats	Jon Gillies 39 saves / 41 shots

April 23	South Carolina Stingrays	2–3	OT	Orlando Solar Bears	Kia Center	Recap
No scoring		First period		No scoring
Andrew Perrott (1) – 13:56; Kyler Kupka (1) – pp – 16:25		Second period		6:27 – Mark Auk (1); 18:58 – Aaron Luchuk (3)
No scoring		Third period		No scoring
No scoring		First overtime period		10:24 – Ara Nazarian (1)
Mitchell Gibson 27 saves / 30 shots		Goalie stats		Jon Gillies 41 saves / 43 shots

April 24	South Carolina Stingrays	4–3	OT	Orlando Solar Bears	Kia Center	Recap
Alexander Suzdalev (2) – 13:57; Erik Middendorf (1) – 15:10		First period		12:17 – Aaron Luchuk (4); 15:38 – Aaron Luchuk (5)
Erik Middendorf (2) – 3:47		Second period		No scoring
No scoring		Third period		14:23 – Alex Frye (1)
Charlie Combs (2) – 9:45		First overtime period		No scoring
Seth Eisele 41 saves / 44 shots		Goalie stats		Jon Gillies 35 saves / 39 shots

April 27	Orlando Solar Bears	6–2	South Carolina Stingrays	North Charleston Coliseum	Recap
Spencer Kersten (2) – 11:13; Anthony Bardaro (2) – 11:47; Anthony Bardaro (3) – pp – 18:12		First period	19:00 – sh – Ryan Hofer (3)
Alex Frye (2) – 7:39		Second period	11:39 – sh – Jayden Lee (2)
Tyler Bird (4) – 1:45; Spencer Kersten (3) – en – 19:33		Third period	No scoring
Jon Gillies 17 saves / 19 shots		Goalie stats	Mitchell Gibson 23 saves / 28 shots

April 29	Orlando Solar Bears	2–0	South Carolina Stingrays	North Charleston Coliseum	Recap
No scoring		First period	No scoring
Hudson Thornton (1) – 15:03		Second period	No scoring
Spencer Kersten (4) – en – 19:49		Third period	No scoring
Jon Gillies 22 saves / 22 shots		Goalie stats	Seth Eisele 24 saves / 25 shots

Orlando won series 4–3

==== (2) Florida Everblades vs. (3) Jacksonville Icemen ====
April 18	Jacksonville Icemen	2–3	OT	Florida Everblades	Hertz Arena	Recap
No scoring		First period		2:15 – pp – Jordan Sambrook (1)
Olivier Nadeau (1) – pp – 10:32; Logan Cockerill (1) – 11:46		Second period		No scoring
No scoring		Third period		16:31 – sh – Kyle Betts (1)
No scoring		First overtime period		13:05 – Alex Kile (1)
Matt Vernon 49 saves / 52 shots		Goalie stats		Cam Johnson 31 saves / 33 shots

April 19	Jacksonville Icemen	1–2	OT	Florida Everblades	Hertz Arena	Recap
No scoring		First period		No scoring
No scoring		Second period		6:39 – pp – Carson Gicewicz (1)
Derek Lodermeier (1) – sh – 5:03		Third period		No scoring
No scoring		First overtime period		3:36 – Andrew Fyten (1)
Justen Close 32 saves / 34 shots		Goalie stats		Cam Johnson 23 saves / 24 shots

April 23	Florida Everblades	2–1	OT	Jacksonville Icemen	VyStar Veterans Memorial Arena	Recap
Colton Hargrove (1) – 19:42		First period		No scoring
No scoring		Second period		9:55 – Chris Grando (1)
No scoring		Third period		No scoring
Anton Malmström (1) – 6:26		First overtime period		No scoring
Cam Johnson 22 saves / 23 shots		Goalie stats		Matt Vernon 27 saves / 29 shots

April 24	Florida Everblades	4–3	OT	Jacksonville Icemen	VyStar Veterans Memorial Arena	Recap
Kyle Betts (2) – 19:41		First period		3:47 – Logan Cockerill (2)
Cole Moberg (1) – 5:23; Colton Hargrove (2) – 18:08		Second period		No scoring
No scoring		Third period		12:20 – Christopher Brown (1); 18:13 – Logan Cockerill (3)
Logan Lambdin (1) – pp – 12:02		First overtime period		No scoring
Cam Johnson 25 saves / 28 shots		Goalie stats		Justen Close 43 saves / 47 shots

Florida won series 4–0

=== Central Division ===
==== (1) Toledo Walleye vs. (4) Indy Fuel ====
April 17	Indy Fuel	3–6	Toledo Walleye	Huntington Center	Recap
No scoring		First period	4:32 – Trenton Bliss (1); 6:22 – pp – Brandon Hawkins (1)
Owen Robinson (1) – 2:52; Bryan Lemos (1) – 9:30		Second period	4:34 – Jalen Smereck (1); 6:51 – Sam Craggs (1); 13:22 – Sam Craggs (2)
Jarrett Lee (1) – 12:25		Third period	1:39 – Colin Swoyer (1)
Ben Gaudreau 24 saves / 30 shots		Goalie stats	Jan Bednář 24 saves / 27 shots

April 18	Indy Fuel	2–5	Toledo Walleye	Huntington Center	Recap
No scoring		First period	3:10 – Mitchell Lewandowski (1); 11:35 – Jalen Smereck (1)
Matus Spodniak (1) – 1:51; Ethan Manderville (1) – 17:04		Second period	9:34 – Trenton Bliss (2)
No scoring		Third period	15:40 – pp – Mitchell Lewandowski (2); 17:24 – pp – Brandon Hawkins (2)
Ben Gaudreau 19 saves / 24 shots		Goalie stats	Carter Gylander 16 saves / 18 shots

April 21	Toledo Walleye	5–3	Indy Fuel	Fishers Event Center	Recap
Billy Moskal (1) – 18:48		First period	11:40 – Bryan Lemos (2)
Brandon Hawkins (3) – 1:09; Mitchell Lewandowski (3) – 13:01; Brandon Hawkins (4) – pp – 15:46; Carson Bantle (1) – pp – 17:35		Second period	14:49 – pp – Kevin Lombardi (1)
No scoring		Third period	7:52 – pp – Kevin Lombardi (2)
Jan Bednář 21 saves / 24 shots		Goalie stats	Ben Gaudreau 18 saves / 23 shots Ryan Ouellette 7 saves / 7 shots

April 22	Toledo Walleye	4–2	Indy Fuel	Fishers Event Center	Recap
Matt Anderson (1) – 11:29		First period	No scoring
Mitchell Lewandowski (4) – pp – 7:08		Second period	No scoring
Carson Bantle (2) – sh – 4:48; Sam Craggs (3) – en – 19:50		Third period	Ethan Manderville (2) – 5:18; Kevin Lombardi (3) – 17:03
Carter Gylander 23 saves / 25 shots		Goalie stats	Ben Gaudreau 16 saves / 19 shots

Toledo won series 4–0

==== (2) Fort Wayne Komets vs. (3) Iowa Heartlanders ====
April 18	Iowa Heartlanders	5–3	Fort Wayne Komets	Allen County War Memorial Coliseum	Recap
Matthew Sop (1) – 13:23		First period	No scoring
Dakota Raabe (1) – pp – 1:33; Keltie Jeri-Leon (1) – pp – 14:36		Second period	No scoring
Gavin Hain (1) – 9:40; Adam Goodsir (1) – sh – 13:38		Third period	0:22 – pp – James Stefan (1); 8:11 – Alex Aleardi (1); 14:10 – pp – Alex Aleardi (2)
Kyle McClellan 24 saves / 27 shots		Goalie stats	Brett Brochu 27 saves / 32 shots

April 19	Iowa Heartlanders	2–5	Fort Wayne Komets	Allen County War Memorial Coliseum	Recap
Will Calverley (1) – pp – 3:13		First period	11:48 – pp – Alex Aleardi (3); 18:36 – Blake Murray (1)
No scoring		Second period	5:53 – Jack Dugan (1)
Jules Boscq (1) – 0:27		Third period	1:13 – Jack Dugan (2); 3:20 – pp – Kirill Tyutyayev (1)
William Rousseau 25 saves / 30 shots		Goalie stats	Brett Brochu 23 saves / 25 shots

April 21	Fort Wayne Komets	7–6	OT	Iowa Heartlanders	Xtream Arena	Recap
Jack Dugan (3) – 12:08; Ethan Keppen (1) – 19:21		First period		4:19 – Nathan Noel (1); 18:02 – Nathan Noel (2)
Blake Murray (2) – 1:03; Ethan Keppen (2) – pp – 18:29		Second period		No scoring
Kirill Tyutyayev (2) – 1:36; Zach Jordan (1) – 2:09		Third period		0:34 – pp – Ryan McGuire (1); 1:27 – Yuki Miura (1); 5:11 – pp – Keltie Jeri-Leon (2); 16:58 – Jack O'Brien (1)
Jack Gorniak (1) – 2:17		First overtime period		No scoring
Brett Brochu 20 saves / 26 shots		Goalie stats		Kyle McClellan 33 saves / 40 shots

April 22	Fort Wayne Komets	2–3	2OT	Iowa Heartlanders	Xtream Arena	Recap
No scoring		First period		13:50 – Mike Koster (1); 18:22 – pp – Jack O'Brien (2)
Alex Swetlikoff (1) – pp – 14:15		Second period		No scoring
Odeen Tufto (1) – pp – 13:14		Third period		No scoring
No scoring		Second overtime period		7:07 – Zeteny Hadobas (1)
Nathaniel Day 35 saves / 38 shots		Goalie stats		William Rousseau 32 saves / 34 shots

April 24	Fort Wayne Komets	2–5	Iowa Heartlanders	Xtream Arena	Recap
No scoring		First period	12:27 – pp – Keltie Jeri-Leon (3); 15:56 – Keltie Jeri-Leon (4); 17:19 – Jack O'Brien (3)
Matt Murphy (1) – 2:14		Second period	16:28 – Mike Koster (2)
Zach Jordan (2) – sh – 1:31		Third period	18:13 – en – Luke Mobley (1)
Brett Brochu 6 saves / 9 shots Nathaniel Day 11 saves / 12 shots		Goalie stats	William Rousseau 34 saves / 36 shots

April 27	Iowa Heartlanders	1–6	Fort Wayne Komets	Allen County War Memorial Coliseum	Recap
No scoring		First period	14:27 – Alex Aleardi (4); 18:02 – sh – Nolan Volcan (1)
Jonny Sorenson (1) – 10:22		Second period	8:23 – Jack Gorniak (2); 14:39 – Ethan Keppen (3); 16:47 – Zach Jordan (3)
No scoring		Third period	1:42 – pp – Brannon McManus (1)
William Rousseau 22 saves / 27 shots Kyle McClellan 8 saves / 9 shots		Goalie stats	Nathaniel Day 18 saves / 19 shots

April 29	Iowa Heartlanders	1–4	Fort Wayne Komets	Allen County War Memorial Coliseum	Recap
Ryan Miotto (1) – 5:36		First period	No scoring
No scoring		Second period	1:25 – Blake Murray (3); 10:19 – pp – Alex Swetlikoff (2); 13:04 – Ethan Keppen (4)
No scoring		Third period	19:32 – en – Anthony Petruzzelli (1)
William Rousseau 17 saves / 20 shots		Goalie stats	Nathaniel Day 32 saves / 33 shots

Fort Wayne won series 4–3

=== Mountain Division ===
==== (1) Kansas City Mavericks vs. (4) Tulsa Oilers ====
April 18	Tulsa Oilers	4–2	Kansas City Mavericks	Cable Dahmer Arena	Recap
No scoring		First period	No scoring
No scoring		Second period	1:16 – Nate Knoepke (1); 5:08 – Damien Giroux (1)
Drew Elliott (1) – pp – 0:15; Reid Petryk (1) – 8:49; Alec Butcher (1) – 9:20; Drew Elliott (2) – en – 19:44		Third period	No scoring
Vyacheslav Buteyets 28 saves / 30 shots		Goalie stats	Jack LaFontaine 23 saves / 26 shots

April 19	Tulsa Oilers	2–3	OT	Kansas City Mavericks	Cable Dahmer Arena	Recap
Keegan Iverson (1) – 15:47		First period		14:18 – Cade Borchardt (1)
No scoring		Second period		No scoring
Drew Elliott (3) – 10:00		Third period		18:47 – Cade Borchardt (2)
No scoring		First overtime period		17:09 – Marcus Crawford (1)
Vyacheslav Buteyets 34 saves / 37 shots		Goalie stats		Jack LaFontaine 29 saves / 31 shots

April 22	Kansas City Mavericks	5–1	Tulsa Oilers	BOK Center	Recap
Cade Borchardt (3) – 12:11		First period	No scoring
Damien Giroux (2) – 9:01; Zack Trott (1) – 16:44; Charlie Wright (1) – 18:45; David Cotton (1) – 19:10		Second period	No scoring
No scoring		Third period	16:01 – Mike McKee (1)
Jack LaFontaine 23 saves / 24 shots		Goalie stats	Vyacheslav Buteyets 14 saves / 19 shots Talyn Boyko 7 saves / 7 shots

April 24	Kansas City Mavericks	2–0	Tulsa Oilers	BOK Center	Recap
Marcus Crawford (2) – 8:54		First period	No scoring
No scoring		Second period	No scoring
Justin MacPherson (1) – 8:36		Third period	No scoring
Jack LaFontaine 29 saves / 29 shots		Goalie stats	Talyn Boyko 19 saves / 21 shots

April 25	Kansas City Mavericks	1–4	Tulsa Oilers	BOK Center	Recap
No scoring		First period	No scoring
No scoring		Second period	8:21 – Tyler Poulsen (1)
David Cotton (2) – pp – 16:59		Third period	1:31 – pp – Conner Roulette (1); 11:38 – Drew Elliott (4); 19:21 – en – Tyler Poulsen (2)
Jack LaFontaine 22 saves / 25 shots		Goalie stats	Vyacheslav Buteyets 41 saves / 42 shots

April 28	Tulsa Oilers	0–4	Kansas City Mavericks	Cable Dahmer Arena	Recap
No scoring		First period	9:45 – sh – Cade Borchardt (4); 16:32 – Jackson Berezowski (1)
No scoring		Second period	17:59 – Damien Giroux (3)
No scoring		Third period	13:07 – Nolan Sullivan (1)
Vyacheslav Buteyets 28 saves / 32 shots		Goalie stats	Jack LaFontaine 24 saves / 24 shots

Kansas City won series 4–2

==== (2) Wichita Thunder vs. (3) Tahoe Knight Monsters ====
April 19	Tahoe Knight Monsters	6–1	Wichita Thunder	Intrust Bank Arena	Recap
Bear Hughes (1) – pp – 4:25		First period	No scoring
Jett Jones (1) – 2:26; Jett Jones (2) – pp – 9:31; Jett Jones (3) – pp – 14:41; Jett Jones (4) – 16:36; Logan Nelson (1) – pp – 19:57		Second period	9:45 – Joe Carroll (1)
No scoring		Third period	No scoring
Jesper Vikman 32 saves / 33 shots		Goalie stats	Trevor Gorsuch 11 saves / 17 shots Roddy Ross 7 saves / 7 shots

April 20	Tahoe Knight Monsters	8–1	Wichita Thunder	Intrust Bank Arena	Recap
Joe Fleming (1) – 18:08		First period	12:24 – Dillon Boucher (1)
Luke Adam (1) – pp – 3:34; Patrick Newell (1) – 17:58		Second period	No scoring
Isaac Johnson (1) – 1:26; Simon Pinard (1) – 2:57; Logan Nelson (2) – 4:09; Jake McGrew (1) – 5:04; Joe Fleming (2) – 16:41		Third period	No scoring
Jesper Vikman 29 saves / 30 shots		Goalie stats	Roddy Ross 36 saves / 44 shots

April 23	Wichita Thunder	4–5	OT	Tahoe Knight Monsters	Tahoe Blue Event Center	Recap
Ryan Finnegan (1) – 13:33; Michal Stinil (1) – 14:41		First period		7:17 – Isaac Johnson (2)
Joe Carroll (2) – pp – 17:56		Second period		13:04 – pp – Simon Pinard (2)
Spencer Blackwell (1) – 1:32		Third period		6:10 – Simon Pinard (3); 16:38 – pp – Patrick Newell (2)
No scoring		First overtime period		6:59 – pp – Logan Nelson (3)
Trevor Gorsuch 60 saves / 65 shots		Goalie stats		Jesper Vikman 32 saves / 36 shots

April 25	Wichita Thunder	2–3	Tahoe Knight Monsters	Tahoe Blue Event Center	Recap
No scoring		First period	12:39 – Adrien Bisson (1)
Spencer Blackwell (2) – 15:33; Joe Carroll (3) – 18:02		Second period	No scoring
No scoring		Third period	9:07 – Bear Hughes (2); 17:16 – Patrick Newell (3)
Trevor Gorsuch 36 saves / 39 shots		Goalie stats	Jesper Vikman 25 saves / 27 shots

Tahoe won series 4–0

== Division finals ==
Note: All times listed are in EDT (UTC−4).

=== North Division ===
==== (1) Trois-Rivières Lions vs. (3) Norfolk Admirals ====
May 2	Norfolk Admirals	0–1	Trois-Rivières Lions	Colisée Vidéotron	Recap
No scoring		First period	No scoring
No scoring		Second period	5:22 – Xavier Cormier (1)
No scoring		Third period	No scoring
Thomas Milic 34 saves / 35 shots		Goalie stats	Hunter Jones 27 saves / 27 shots

May 4	Norfolk Admirals	4–3	Trois-Rivières Lions	Colisée Vidéotron	Recap
Hank Crone (1) – 19:43; Ryan Chyzowski (3) – 19:54		First period	18:14 – Morgan Adams-Moisan (2)
Bryce Brodzinski (2) – 8:30; Brandon Osmundson (2) – 17:37		Second period	No scoring
No scoring		Third period	1:23 – Anthony Beauregard (3); 14:20 – Tyler Hylland (1)
Thomas Milic 24 saves / 27 shots		Goalie stats	Luke Cavallin 23 saves / 27 shots

May 8	Trois-Rivières Lions	4–1	Norfolk Admirals	Norfolk Scope	Recap
Alex Beaucage (5) – pp – 2:05; Alex Beaucage (6) – 7:17		First period	No scoring
No scoring		Second period	No scoring
Tyler Hylland (2) – 2:48; Anthony Beauregard (4) – pp – 15:00		Third period	19:26 – pp – Brady Fleurent (2)
Luke Cavallin 25 saves / 26 shots		Goalie stats	Domenic DiVincentiis 17 saves / 21 shots

May 9	Trois-Rivières Lions	0–1	Norfolk Admirals	Norfolk Scope	Recap
No scoring		First period	No scoring
No scoring		Second period	13:52 – Brandon Osmundson (3)
No scoring		Third period	No scoring
Luke Cavallin 24 saves / 25 shots		Goalie stats	Thomas Milic 24 saves / 24 shots

May 11	Trois-Rivières Lions	1–0	OT	Norfolk Admirals	Norfolk Scope	Recap
No scoring		First period		No scoring
No scoring		Second period		No scoring
No scoring		Third period		No scoring
Anthony Beauregard (5) – 19:44		First overtime period		No scoring
Luke Cavallin 31 saves / 31 shots		Goalie stats		Thomas Milic 33 saves / 34 shots

May 13	Norfolk Admirals	3–6	Trois-Rivières Lions	Colisée Vidéotron	Recap
Connor Fedorek (1) – 4:08; Justin Young (1) – 8:23		First period	2:17 – Andrew Coxhead (2)
Brandon Osmundson (4) – 13:19		Second period	5:15 – Chris Jandric (1); 11:31 – Jakov Novak (3)
No scoring		Third period	1:53 – Nicolas Guay (4); 18:19 – Anthony Beauregard (6); 19:21 – en – Anthony Beauregard (7)
Thomas Milic 18 saves / 23 shots		Goalie stats	Luke Cavallin 22 saves / 25 shots

Trois-Rivières won series 4–2

=== South Division ===
==== (2) Florida Everblades vs. (4) Orlando Solar Bears ====
May 2	Orlando Solar Bears	3–5	Florida Everblades	Hertz Arena	Recap
No scoring		First period	5:38 – Cole Moberg (2)
No scoring		Second period	1:34 – pp – Jesse Lansdell (1); 12:23 – Jordan Sambrook (2); 15:13 – Colton Hargrove (3); 18:56 – pp – Carson Gicewicz (2)
Hudson Thornton (2) – 1:25; Spencer Kersten (5) – 6:44; Djibril Touré (1) – 14:36		Third period	No scoring
Jon Gillies 14 saves / 18 shots Ryan Fanti 8 saves / 9 shots		Goalie stats	Cam Johnson 15 saves / 18 shots

May 3	Orlando Solar Bears	2–6	Florida Everblades	Hertz Arena	Recap
Ara Nazarian (2) – 11:18		First period	3:59 – Tarun Fizer (1); 4:29 – Colton Hargrove (4)
No scoring		Second period	5:07 – Tarun Fizer (2)
Anthony Bardaro (4) – 16:41		Third period	4:55 – Logan Lambdin (2); 7:41 – Dillon Hamaliuk (1); 18:40 – sh-en – Kyle Betts (3)
Jon Gillies 22 saves / 27 shots		Goalie stats	Cam Johnson 32 saves / 34 shots

May 6	Florida Everblades	1–2	Orlando Solar Bears	Kia Center	Recap
No scoring		First period	No scoring
No scoring		Second period	2:50 – Spencer Kersten (6)
Isaac Nurse (1) – 18:35		Third period	12:39 – Aaron Luchuk (6)
Cam Johnson 20 saves / 22 shots		Goalie stats	Ryan Fanti 30 saves / 31 shots

May 9	Florida Everblades	3–0	Orlando Solar Bears	Kia Center	Recap
No scoring		First period	No scoring
Oliver Chau (1) – 3:27		Second period	No scoring
Oliver Chau (2) – 12:02; Logan Lambdin (3) – 12:54		Third period	No scoring
Cam Johnson 22 saves / 22 shots		Goalie stats	Ryan Fanti 28 saves / 31 shots

May 10	Florida Everblades	3–1	Orlando Solar Bears	Kia Center	Recap
No scoring		First period	7:51 – Anthony Bardaro (5)
Colton Hargrove (5) – 3:25		Second period	No scoring
Cole Moberg (3) – pp – 18:12; Oliver Chau (3) – en – 19:59		Third period	No scoring
Cam Johnson 14 saves / 15 shots		Goalie stats	Ryan Fanti 34 saves / 36 shots

Florida won series 4–1

=== Central Division ===
==== (1) Toledo Walleye vs. (2) Fort Wayne Komets ====
May 2	Fort Wayne Komets	4–5	Toledo Walleye	Huntington Center	Recap
Blake Murray (4) – 8:30; Alex Aleardi (5) – 14:20		First period	12:12 – Colby Ambrosio (1); 12:53 – Colin Swoyer (2)
Ethan Keppen (5) – 6:31; Alex Aleardi (6) – 13:13		Second period	10:55 – Tyler Spezia (1); 17:46 – Trenton Bliss (3); 19:44 – Matt Anderson (2)
No scoring		Third period	No scoring
Nathaniel Day 21 saves / 26 shots		Goalie stats	Jan Bednář 24 saves / 28 shots

May 3	Fort Wayne Komets	6–1	Toledo Walleye	Huntington Center	Recap
Zach Jordan (4) – 17:54		First period	No scoring
Ethan Keppen (6) – 1:10; Ethan Keppen (7) – 12:05		Second period	14:48 – pp – Trenton Bliss (4)
Alex Swetlikoff (3) – pp – 0:38; James Stefan (2) – pp – 7:52; Blake Murray (5) – 19:59		Third period	No scoring
Brett Brochu 21 saves / 22 shots		Goalie stats	Carter Gylander 30 saves / 36 shots

May 5	Toledo Walleye	1–2	Fort Wayne Komets	Allen County War Memorial Coliseum	Recap
No scoring		First period	19:46 – Kyle Mayhew (1)
No scoring		Second period	No scoring
Colby Ambrosio (2) – 7:46		Third period	14:58 – Darren Brady (1)
Jan Bednář 25 saves / 27 shots		Goalie stats	Brett Brochu 32 saves / 33 shots

May 7	Toledo Walleye	3–2	2OT	Fort Wayne Komets	Allen County War Memorial Coliseum	Recap
Colin Swoyer (3) – 13:34		First period		No scoring
No scoring		Second period		No scoring
Colby Ambrosio (3) – 8:47		Third period		17:28 – James Stefan (3); 18:55 – ps – Jack Dugan (4)
Tyler Spezia (2) – 0:26		Second overtime period		No scoring
Carter Gylander 37 saves / 39 shots		Goalie stats		Brett Brochu 33 saves / 36 shots

May 8	Toledo Walleye	2–1	Fort Wayne Komets	Allen County War Memorial Coliseum	Recap
No scoring		First period	No scoring
No scoring		Second period	No scoring
Tyler Spezia (3) – 8:31; Colin Swoyer (4) – 19:36		Third period	4:10 – Anthony Petruzzelli (2)
Jan Bednář 34 saves / 35 shots		Goalie stats	Brett Brochu 10 saves / 12 shots

May 10	Fort Wayne Komets	3–5	Toledo Walleye	Huntington Center	Recap
No scoring		First period	No scoring
James Stefan (4) – pp – 0:35; Jack Dugan (5) – 7:24		Second period	7:08 – Dylan Moulton (1); 11:04 – pp – Tyler Spezia (4); 19:06 – Dylan Moulton (2)
Josh Groll (1) – 14:58		Third period	3:26 – Tyler Spezia (5); 19:11 – en – Matt Anderson (3)
Brett Brochu 25 saves / 29 shots		Goalie stats	Carter Gylander 26 saves / 29 shots

Toledo won series 4–2

=== Mountain Division ===
==== (1) Kansas City Mavericks vs. (3) Tahoe Knight Monsters ====
May 4	Tahoe Knight Monsters	3–5	Kansas City Mavericks	Cable Dahmer Arena	Recap
No scoring		First period	No scoring
Sloan Stanick (1) – pp – 6:26		Second period	No scoring
Simon Pinard (4) – pp – 2:47; Jett Jones (5) – pp – 11:15		Third period	0:46 – Casey Carreau (1); 5:48 – Justin MacPherson (2); 12:31 – Damien Giroux (4); 16:18 – Marcus Crawford (3); 18:05 – en – Cade Borchardt (5)
Jesper Vikman 43 saves / 47 shots		Goalie stats	Jack LaFontaine 34 saves / 37 shots

May 5	Tahoe Knight Monsters	0–3	Kansas City Mavericks	Cable Dahmer Arena	Recap
No scoring		First period	No scoring
No scoring		Second period	3:49 – Nathan Dunkley (1)
No scoring		Third period	16:53 – sh – Cade Borchardt (6); 18:27 – en – Cam Morrison (1)
Jesper Vikman 30 saves / 32 shots		Goalie stats	Jack LaFontaine 21 saves / 21 shots

May 8	Kansas City Mavericks	3–1	Tahoe Knight Monsters	Tahoe Blue Event Center	Recap
Zack Trott (2) – pp – 19:53		First period	17:46 – pp – Bear Hughes (3)
Damien Giroux (5) – pp – 12:25; Casey Carreau (2) – 16:15		Second period	No scoring
No scoring		Third period	No scoring
Jack LaFontaine 27 saves / 28 shots		Goalie stats	Jesper Vikman 26 saves / 29 shots

May 9	Kansas City Mavericks	6–0	Tahoe Knight Monsters	Tahoe Blue Event Center	Recap
Max Andreev (1) – 1:42; Cade Borchardt (7) – pp – 15:15; Jackson Berezowski (2) – pp – 16:19		First period	No scoring
Damien Giroux (6) – pp – 0:21		Second period	No scoring
Max Andreev (2) – 3:28; Jake McLaughlin (1) – 7:24		Third period	No scoring
Jack LaFontaine 25 saves / 25 shots		Goalie stats	Jesper Vikman 27 saves / 33 shots

Kansas City won series 4–0

== Conference finals ==
Note: All times listed are in EDT (UTC−4).

=== Eastern Conference ===
==== (N1) Trois-Rivières Lions vs. (S2) Florida Everblades ====
May 17	Trois-Rivières Lions	1–0	Florida Everblades	Hertz Arena	Recap

May 18	Trois-Rivières Lions	2–1	Florida Everblades	Hertz Arena	Recap

May 21	Florida Everblades	4–2	Trois-Rivières Lions	Colisée Vidéotron	Recap

May 23	Florida Everblades	4–0	Trois-Rivières Lions	Colisée Vidéotron	Recap

May 24	Florida Everblades	1–3	Trois-Rivières Lions	Colisée Vidéotron	Recap

May 27	Trois-Rivières Lions	6–0	Florida Everblades	Hertz Arena	Recap

Trois-Rivières won series 4–2

=== Western Conference ===
==== (C1) Toledo Walleye vs. (M1) Kansas City Mavericks ====
May 15	Toledo Walleye	2–0	Kansas City Mavericks	Cable Dahmer Arena	Recap

May 17	Toledo Walleye	4–3	Kansas City Mavericks	Cable Dahmer Arena	Recap

May 20	Kansas City Mavericks	5–2	Toledo Walleye	Huntington Center	Recap

May 22	Kansas City Mavericks	1–4	Toledo Walleye	Huntington Center	Recap

May 24	Kansas City Mavericks	2–5	Toledo Walleye	Huntington Center	Recap

Toledo won series 4–1

== Kelly Cup finals ==
=== (N1) Trois-Rivières Lions vs. (C1) Toledo Walleye ===
May 31	Trois-Rivières Lions	1–3	Toledo Walleye	Huntington Center	Recap
0		First period	0
1		Second period	2
0		Third period	1
Luke Cavallin		Goalie stats	Jan Bednář

June 2	Trois-Rivières Lions	5–1	Toledo Walleye	Huntington Center	Recap

June 4	Toledo Walleye	2–3	Trois-Rivières Lions	Colisée Vidéotron	Recap

June 6	Toledo Walleye	1–3	Trois-Rivières Lions	Colisée Vidéotron	Recap

June 7	Toledo Walleye	1–3	Trois-Rivières Lions	Colisée Vidéotron	Recap

Trois-Rivières won series 4–1

== Statistical leaders ==
=== Skaters ===
These are the top ten skaters based on points.

Player	Team	GP	G	A	Pts	+/–	PIM
Brandon Hawkins	Toledo Walleye	19	6	18	24	+9	18
Trenton Bliss	Toledo Walleye	19	9	13	22	+10	4
Xavier Cormier	Trois-Rivières Lions	21	2	17	19	+16	18
Alex Beaucage	Trois-Rivières Lions	21	10	8	18	+17	16
Anthony Beauregard	Trois-Rivières Lions	21	10	8	18	+10	16
Jack Dugan	Fort Wayne Komets	13	5	10	15	−5	18
Jalen Smereck	Toledo Walleye	19	3	11	14	+6	30
Mitchell Lewandowski	Toledo Walleye	16	5	8	13	+4	20
Nicolas Guay	Trois-Rivières Lions	21	5	8	13	+6	6
Chris Jandric	Trois-Rivières Lions	21	4	9	13	+8	18

GP = Games played; G = Goals; A = Assists; Pts = Points; +/– = Plus/minus; PIM = Penalty minutes

=== Goaltending ===
This is a combined of the top five goaltenders based on goals against average and the top five goaltenders based on save percentage, with at least 240 minutes played as of May 13, 2025. The table is sorted by GAA, and the criteria for inclusion are bolded.

Player	Team	GP	W	L	OTL	SA	GA	GAA	SV%	SO	TOI
Jack LaFontaine	Kansas City Mavericks	10	8	2	0	270	13	**1.28**	**0.952**	4	611
Cam Johnson	Florida Everblades	9	8	1	0	219	15	**1.58**	**0.932**	1	570
Thomas Milic	Norfolk Admirals	9	5	3	1	271	15	**1.61**	**0.945**	3	558
Luke Cavallin	Trois-Rivières Lions	9	7	2	0	261	16	**1.65**	**0.939**	1	581
Nathaniel Day	Fort Wayne Komets	5	2	1	1	128	11	**2.17**	0.914	0	304

GP = Games played; W = Wins; L = Losses; OTL = Overtime Losses; SA = Shots against; GA = Goals against; GAA = Goals against average; SV% = Save percentage; SO = Shutouts; TOI = Time on ice (in minutes)
