= Chris Jandric =

Canadian ice hockey player

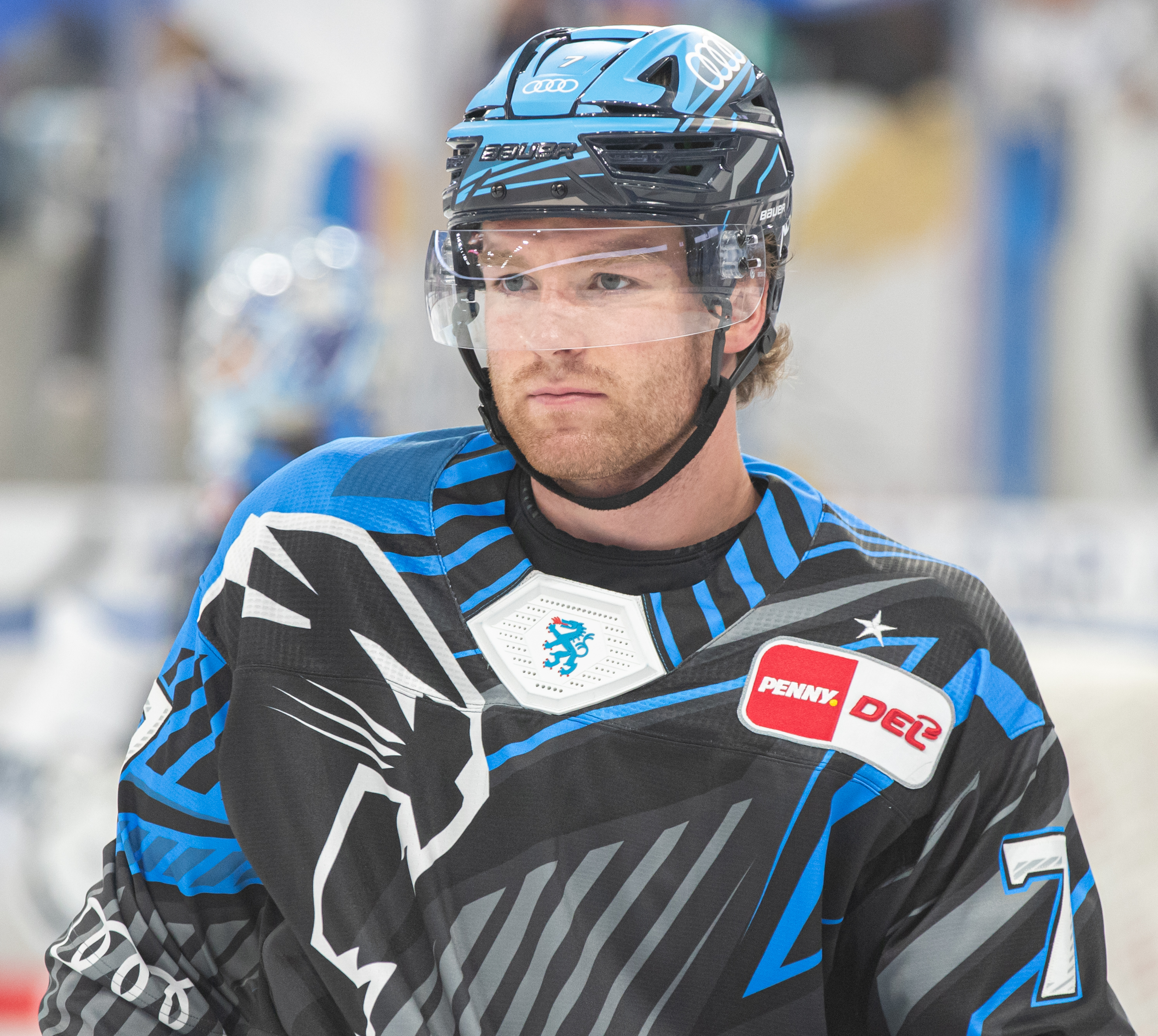
- Jandric in September 2025
- Born: October 3, 1998 (age 27) Prince George, British Columbia
- Height: 5 ft 11 in (180 cm)
- Weight: 180 lb (82 kg; 12 st 12 lb)
- Position: Defence
- Shoots: Left
- DEL team Former teams: ERC Ingolstadt; Rochester Americans; Laval Rocket
- NHL draft: Undrafted
- Playing career: 2023–present

Chris Jandric (born October 3, 1998) is a Canadian professional ice hockey defenceman for ERC Ingolstadt of the Deutsche Eishockey Liga (DEL). He is a former first team All-NCHC member as part of the North Dakota Fighting Hawks and won the Kelly Cup with the Trois-Rivières Lions in 2025.

== Playing career ==
=== Amateur ===
In his youth, Jandric typically played as a forward, like his brother Steven. Around the age of 10, he changed position to a defenseman, reasoning that his skating skills were sufficient and it would be easier to make rosters that way. In addition to playing tennis in high school, Jandric played minor hockey for the Cariboo Cougars of the BC Hockey Major Midget League (BCMML) from 2014 to 2016, where he was briefly the teammate of future NHL forward Dylan Cozens.

=== Collegiate ===
Following time in minor hockey, Jandric spent time with the Vernon Vipers of the British Columbia Hockey League (BCHL) before committing, along with his brother, to the University of Alaska Fairbanks (UAF) of the National Collegiate Athletic Association (NCAA). He regularly worked out at a CrossFit gym in Prince George, British Columbia during the offseason, in order to physically keep up with the rigors of college hockey, and with an eye on constant improvement. In 2019, Jandric made the WCHA All-Rookie Team and, in total, appeared in 63 games for the school. After UAF opted out of the 2020–21 season due to concerns surrounding the COVID-19 pandemic, he would take the year off in order to strengthen his body before transferring to the University of North Dakota (UND). Jandric described the opportunity as "once-in-a lifetime", and stated his goal was to win the NCAA ice hockey championship. Collectively, he would appear in 77 games over two seasons for UND with the Fighting Hawks, tallying five goals and 48 points during that period. Jandric led the team's power play unit, which produced the second highest scoring rate in the nation, as well as himself personally leading the team in plus-minus, with a +16 differential. His coach, Brad Berry, described Jandric's speed/agility as both "high end" and "elite". In 2023, he was selected to the All-NCHC First Team, as well as the Academic All-NCHC Team.

=== Professional ===
On March 27, 2023, Jandric was signed to a two-year contract by the Rochester Americans of the American Hockey League (AHL), with a professional tryout (PTO) for the remainder of the 2022-23 season. In his AHL debut versus the Utica Comets, he recorded an assist.

Jandric was one of 35 players invited to the 2023 Buffalo Sabres Development Camp, along with former teammate Matteo Costantini, who was selected by the Sabres in the fifth round of the 2020 NHL entry draft. He was also part of the roster for the team's annual Prospect Challenge Tournament. Following signature to a PTO, he was invited to Buffalo for the initial portion of NHL training camp, but was released nine days later so he could take part in the respective training camp for Rochester. On October 9, it was announced that Jandric had been assigned to the Jacksonville Icemen, the ECHL affiliate for both the Sabres as well as the Americans. He recorded his inaugural ECHL point on the Icemen's first goal of the season, with an assist. After collecting a total of two assists in six games with the Icemen, Jandric was recalled to the Americans on November 6, 2023. He would play in seven games for Rochester, recording no points, before being reassigned to Jacksonville on December 29. Thereafter, Jandric scored his first professional goal on January 3, 2024, and followed that up with a game-winning overtime goal on January 6.

On January 11, Jandric was traded to the Laval Rocket in exchange for defenseman Noah Laaouan, and subsequently assigned to the Trois-Rivières Lions of the ECHL. He would notch three assists in six games with the Lions before being recalled to the Rocket on February 1, but was reassigned on February 3 without playing a game. Jandric was recalled yet again by the Rocket on February 7, and made his franchise debut against the Wilkes-Barre/Scranton Penguins on February 17 after an injury to Mattias Norlinder. He then returned to the Lions on March 18. His final movement between teams for the season came on April 8 and April 16 respectively.

Spending the majority of the 2024–25 season with Trois-Rivières, Jandric was assessed a one-game suspension following an incident on January 18, 2025 against the Norfolk Admirals in which he received a match penalty for cross-checking. Just days later, he was named as part of the league's Midseason All-Star Team. After finishing the ECHL season at a nearly point-per-game pace, Jandric was an instrumental part of the Lions' first Kelly Cup win, scoring the championship clinching goal in a 4–1 victory in game 5.

In July 2025, Jandric signed his first contract overseas, agreeing to a one-year contract with ERC Ingolstadt of the German-based Deutsche Eishockey Liga (DEL).

== Personal life ==
Jandric's older brother, Steven, is also a professional hockey player in Finland for Lukko. While at UAF, he earned a degree in business, and had been working on a graduate degree in public administration while attending UND.

== Career statistics ==
			Regular season					Playoffs
Season	Team	League	GP	G	A	Pts	PIM	GP	G	A	Pts	PIM
2014–15	Cariboo Cougars	BCEHL	7	0	3	3	14	—	—	—	—	—
2015–16	Cariboo Cougars	BCEHL	39	5	29	34	36	7	0	5	5	4
2015–16	Vernon Vipers	BCHL	2	0	0	0	0	—	—	—	—	—
2016–17	Vernon Vipers	BCHL	46	2	19	21	34	11	0	6	6	19
2017–18	Vernon Vipers	BCHL	58	4	26	30	46	10	0	5	5	10
2018–19	University of Alaska-Fairbanks	WCHA	28	3	12	15	42	—	—	—	—	—
2019–20	University of Alaska-Fairbanks	WCHA	35	5	17	22	40	—	—	—	—	—
2021–22	University of North Dakota	NCHC	38	1	14	15	39	—	—	—	—	—
2022–23	University of North Dakota	NCHC	39	4	29	33	30	—	—	—	—	—
2022–23	Rochester Americans	AHL	1	0	1	1	2	—	—	—	—	—
2023–24	Jacksonville Icemen	ECHL	12	3	5	8	8	—	—	—	—	—
2023–24	Rochester Americans	AHL	7	0	0	0	8	—	—	—	—	—
2023–24	Trois-Rivières Lions	ECHL	15	0	7	7	8	6	1	1	2	2
2023–24	Laval Rocket	AHL	5	0	0	0	8	—	—	—	—	—
2024–25	Trois-Rivières Lions	ECHL	54	10	40	50	41	21	4	9	13	18
2024–25	Laval Rocket	AHL	5	0	2	2	2	—	—	—	—	—
AHL totals			18	0	3	3	20	—	—	—	—	—
ECHL totals			81	13	52	65	57	27	5	10	15	20

== Awards and honours ==
Award	Year	Ref
College
All-WCHA Rookie Team	2019	
All-WCHA Academic Team	2019, 2020	
All-WCHA Preseason Team	2021	
All-NCHC Academic Team	2022, 2023	
All-NCHC First Team	2023	
ECHL
Kelly Cup champion	2025	
