= Cavallin =

Cavallin is a surname. Notable people with this surname include:

- Albano Bortoletto Cavallin, Brazilian priest
- Francesca Cavallin, Italian actress
- Lars Cavallin, Swedish priest and Catholic theologian
- Mark Cavallin, Canadian-British ice hockey player
