= Colisée =

Colisée may refer to:

== Canada ==
- Colisée de Québec, also known as Colisée Pepsi, Quebec City
- Colisée Cardin, Sorel-Tracy
- Colisée Desjardins, Victoriaville
- Colisée Financière Sun Life, Rimouski
- Colisée Jean Béliveau, Longueuil
- Colisée de Laval, Laval
- Colisée de Trois-Rivières, Trois-Rivières
- Colisée Vidéotron, Trois-Rivières
- Centre Georges-Vézina, formerly Colisée de Chicoutimi, Saguenay

== France ==
- Le Colisée, an indoor arena in Chalon-sur-Saône

== United States ==
- Androscoggin Bank Colisée, Lewiston
