= Norfolk Admirals =

Norfolk Admirals has been the name of two professional ice hockey franchises:

- Norfolk Admirals (AHL), a team which played in the American Hockey League from 2000 to 2015
- Norfolk Admirals (ECHL), an ECHL team based on Norfolk, Virginia, that began play in 2015
