= Luke Cavallin =

Canadian ice hockey player (born 2001)

- Born: April 29, 2001 (age 25) Swindon, England
- Height: 6 ft 2 in (188 cm)
- Weight: 196 lb (89 kg; 14 st 0 lb)
- Position: Goaltender
- Catches: Right
- NHL team (P) Cur. team: Boston Bruins; Maine Mariners (ECHL)
- NHL draft: Undrafted
- Playing career: 2022–present

Luke Cavallin (born April 29, 2001) is a UK-born Canadian professional ice hockey goaltender for the Maine Mariners of the ECHL while under contract to the Boston Bruins of the National Hockey League (NHL).

== Playing career ==
=== Early years ===
As a youth, Cavallin played within the Hockey Eastern Ontario (HEO) ranks and participated in the annual OHL Cup during his midget year.

=== Junior ===
The highest goaltender selected (28th overall) in the 2017 OHL Priority Selection draft, Cavallin played major junior with the Flint Firebirds beginning in the 2017–18 season. Following the suspension of the 2020–21 OHL season due to the COVID-19 pandemic, he was briefly loaned to the Italy-based Ritten Sport of the Alps Hockey League (AlpsHL). During his final OHL campaign in 2021–22, Cavallin led the team to a conference final berth and likewise set twelve new franchise records.

=== Professional ===
In June 2022, Cavallin was signed to a two-year contract with the Toronto Marlies of the American Hockey League (AHL) and played for their ECHL franchise, the Newfoundland Growlers, for the entirety of the 2022–23 season. The following year, he split time between both the Growlers and Marlies organizations.

On September 6, 2024, he agreed to a one year, two-way contract with the Laval Rocket, the top affiliate of the Montreal Canadiens. Thereafter, Cavallin was reassigned to the Trois-Rivières Lions for the 2024–25 ECHL season, where he helped the foregoing capture their first Kelly Cup championship and was named the most valuable player of that year's Kelly Cup playoffs.

Entering the offseason as an unrestricted free agent, Cavallin agreed to a one-year, entry-level contract with the Boston Bruins on July 1, 2025. He then joined the team's affiliated Maine Mariners ahead of the 2025–26 season.

== International play ==
Medal record

Representing Canada

Men's ice hockey

World U-17 Hockey Challenge
| Silver medal – second place | 2017 Canada | |

Internationally, Cavallin represented Hockey Canada as part of team Canada Red at the 2017 World U-17 Hockey Challenge, where his team captured a silver medal following a 6–4 loss to Team USA in the championship game.

== Personal life ==
Cavallin was born in Swindon, England, while his father, Mark, a former professional ice hockey goaltender, played for the Belfast Giants of the UK's British Ice Hockey Superleague (BISL).

His younger brother, Adam, currently plays for the Baie-Comeau Drakkar of the Quebec Maritimes Junior Hockey League (QMJHL).

== Career statistics ==
| | | | Regular season | | | | | | | | | Playoffs |
| Season | Team | League | GP | W | L | T/OT | MIN | GA | SO | GAA | SV% | GP | W | L | MIN | GA | SO | GAA | SV% |
|---|---|---|---|---|---|---|---|---|---|---|---|---|---|---|---|---|---|---|---|
| 2017–18 | Flint Firebirds | OHL | 31 | 7 | 18 | 1 | 1,657 | 116 | 0 | 4.20 | .872 | — | — | — | — | — | — | — | — |
| 2018–19 | Flint Firebirds | OHL | 36 | 8 | 21 | 2 | 1,734 | 151 | 0 | 5.23 | .864 | — | — | — | — | — | — | — | — |
| 2019–20 | Flint Firebirds | OHL | 20 | 11 | 4 | 1 | 1,091 | 67 | 0 | 3.68 | .895 | — | — | — | — | — | — | — | — |
| 2020–21 | Ritten Sport | AlpsHL | 10 | 5 | 3 | 0 | 539 | 26 | 0 | 2.89 | .903 | — | — | — | — | — | — | — | — |
| 2021–22 | Flint Firebirds | OHL | 56 | 36 | 14 | 4 | 3,288 | 173 | 2 | 3.16 | .910 | 19 | 11 | 8 | 1,154 | 52 | 0 | 2.70 | .929 |
| 2022–23 | Newfoundland Growlers | ECHL | 35 | 24 | 9 | 1 | 2,013 | 86 | 2 | 2.56 | .917 | 6 | 2 | 3 | 357 | 14 | 0 | 2.36 | .925 |
| 2023–24 | Toronto Marlies | AHL | 9 | 3 | 4 | 2 | 498 | 25 | 0 | 3.01 | .884 | — | — | — | — | — | — | — | — |
| 2023–24 | Newfoundland Growlers | ECHL | 24 | 15 | 6 | 3 | 1,445 | 71 | 2 | 2.95 | .915 | — | — | — | — | — | — | — | — |
| 2024–25 | Laval Rocket | AHL | 3 | 1 | 1 | 0 | 146 | 6 | 0 | 2.46 | .897 | — | — | — | — | — | — | — | — |
| 2024–25 | Trois-Rivières Lions | ECHL | 32 | 19 | 10 | 2 | 1,863 | 66 | 3 | 2.13 | .929 | 20 | 15 | 5 | 1,218 | 31 | 3 | 1.53 | .948 |
| 2025–26 | Maine Mariners | ECHL | 34 | 18 | 10 | 5 | 2046 | 80 | 4 | 2.35 | .917 |
| 2025–26 | Providence Bruins | AHL | 8 | 6 | 2 | 0 | 487 | 20 | 0 | 2.47 | .910 | — | — | — | — | — | — | — | — |
| AHL totals | | | 20 | 10 | 7 | 2 | 1,131 | 51 | 0 | 2.71 | .897 | — | — | — | — | — | — | — | — |

=== International ===
| Year | Team | Event | Result | GP | W | L | OT | MIN | GA | SO | GAA | SV% |
|---|---|---|---|---|---|---|---|---|---|---|---|---|
| 2017 | Canada Red | U17 | 2nd place, silver medalist(s) | 5 | 3 | 2 | 0 | 297 | 15 | 0 | 3.02 | .904 |
| Junior totals | | | | 5 | 3 | 2 | 0 | 297 | 15 | 0 | 3.02 | .904 |

== Awards and honours ==
| Award | Year | Ref |
International
| World U-17 Hockey Challenge All-Star Team | 2017 | |
OHL
| Second All-Star Team | 2022 | |
ECHL
| Second All-Star Team | 2025 | |
| Kelly Cup | 2025 | |
| Kelly Cup Playoffs Most Valuable Player | 2025 | |
