= Thomas Milic =

Canadian ice hockey player (born 2003)

- Born: April 14, 2003 (age 23) New Westminster, British Columbia, Canada
- Height: 6 ft 0 in (183 cm)
- Weight: 175 lb (79 kg; 12 st 7 lb)
- Position: Goaltender
- Catches: Left
- NHL team (P) Cur. team: Winnipeg Jets; Manitoba Moose (AHL)
- NHL draft: 151st overall, 2023; Winnipeg Jets
- Playing career: 2023–present

Thomas Milic (born April 14, 2003) is a Canadian professional ice hockey goaltender for the Manitoba Moose of the American Hockey League (AHL) as a prospect to the Winnipeg Jets of the National Hockey League (NHL).

== Playing career ==
Milic made his NHL debut on November 29, 2025, against the Carolina Hurricanes in a 1–4 loss; he saved 30 of 34 shots on goal.

== Career statistics ==
			Regular season									Playoffs
Season	Team	League	GP	W	L	OTL	MIN	GA	SO	GAA	SV%	GP	W	L	MIN	GA	SO	GAA	SV%
2019–20	Seattle Thunderbirds	WHL	2	1	0	0	84	5	0	3.57	.886	—	—	—	—	—	—	—	—
2020–21	Seattle Thunderbirds	WHL	9	5	4	0	547	25	1	2.74	.913	—	—	—	—	—	—	—	—
2021–22	Seattle Thunderbirds	WHL	47	27	16	2	2781	113	3	2.44	.912	25	14	9	1523	58	2	2.29	.925
2022–23	Seattle Thunderbirds	WHL	33	27	3	1	1964	68	4	2.08	.928	19	16	3	1141	37	1	1.95	.933
2023–24	Manitoba Moose	AHL	33	19	9	2	1851	84	1	2.72	.900	2	0	2	114	7	0	3.68	.877
2023–24	Norfolk Admirals	ECHL	18	11	3	2	1055	43	2	2.45	.908	—	—	—	—	—	—	—	—
2024–25	Manitoba Moose	AHL	21	5	12	3	1222	70	0	3.44	.877	—	—	—	—	—	—	—	—
2024–25	Norfolk Admirals	ECHL	18	11	5	1	1091	33	3	1.82	.935	9	5	3	558	15	3	1.61	.945
2025–26	Manitoba Moose	AHL	41	20	13	6	2321	102	4	2.64	.905	2	0	2	113	7	0	3.71	.854
2025–26	Winnipeg Jets	NHL	3	0	1	0	139	8	0	3.46	.871	—	—	—	—	—	—	—	—
NHL totals			3	0	1	0	139	8	0	3.46	.871	—	—	—	—	—	—	—	—
