= Lars Cavallin =

Swedish Catholic priest and author (1940–2017)

Lars (Laurentius) Cavallin (15 August 1940 – 18 June 2017 in Borås, Västra Götaland County) was a Swedish priest and Catholic theologian and writer.

== Life ==
Cavallin was of Swedish origin. He converted to Roman Catholicism from Lutheranism in 1958 a month after his mother. His brother Caesar was a priest of the Church of Sweden and also a monk and prior of the Östanbäck Monastery, but he converted to the Roman Catholic Church in 2016.

In 1968 he received his priestly ordination. In 1974 Cavallin was in Rome defended his work Dogma and dogma development with Adolf von Harnack. and was named monsignor.

Cavallin was a theologian doctor and wrote several books on the Roman Catholic Church and translated the Catechism of the Catholic Church.

He was involved in numerous social projects in the Holy Land. In 2003, Cavallin was appointed to the Order of the Holy Sepulchre of Jerusalem by Cardinal-Grandmaster Carlo Furno, and was appointed the Grand Prince of the newly founded Statthalterei Schweden des Papte Laienordens. In 2007 he was succeeded by Anders Arborelius, archbishop of Stockholm and since 2017 Cardinal of the Roman Catholic Church. He was the first Swede to receive the special award of the Holy Sepulchre in Jerusalem.

Between autumn 2006 and spring 2007 he was a church minister in the Christ the King parish, the oldest of three Roman Catholic church communities in Gothenburg. He has also been a dean of the Catholic diocese of Stockholm and bishop to Southern Sweden. Cavallin is renowned for his interest in the older Roman liturgy, which he often celebrated both privately and publicly.

Cavallin published several books and numerous articles. He translated the Catechism of the Catholic Church to Swedish.

== Works ==
- Dogma and dogma development with Adolf von Harnack, Volkach, 1976.
- Catholic Church in the World of Today, 1981.
- Faith and Life in the Catholic Church, 1982.
- Catholic Church in Sweden 1783–1983: A Historic Lookout, 1983.
- Pending in modern times, Ängelholm, 2006, ISBN 91-86428-27-6.
- Benedict XVI: A Theological Introduction, Ängelholm, 2009, ISBN 978-91-85608-14-0.

=== Translation ===
- Catholic Church Catechism, Catholica 2010, ISBN 978-9185608256.
