= Anthony Bardaro =

Canadian-Italian ice hockey player

- Born: 18 September 1992 (age 33) Delta, British Columbia, Canada
- Height: 5 ft 10 in (178 cm)
- Weight: 81 kg (179 lb; 12 st 11 lb)
- Position: Centre
- Shoots: Right
- ECHL team Former teams: Orlando Solar Bears; Asiago Hockey 1935; HC Bolzano; HC Pustertal Wölfe; Ducs d'Angers
- National team: Italy
- NHL draft: Undrafted
- Playing career: 2017–present

Anthony Bardaro (born 18 September 1992) is an Italian-Canadian professional ice hockey centre for the Orlando Solar Bears in the ECHL and the Italy national team.

== Playing career ==
Bardaro previously played professionally with Asiago Hockey 1935 in the Alps Hockey League and Serie A before joining top Italian club, HC Bolzano of the then EBEL, on 12 April 2019. He leaves Bolzano two years later to join HC Pustertal Wölfe in the ICE Hockey League (ICEHL). After six seasons in Italy, he joined Ducs d'Angers in the Ligue Magnus (France) on 30 June 2023.

Bardaro signed with the Orlando Solar Bears in September 2024.

== International career ==
He represented Italy at the 2019 IIHF World Championship.

== Career statistics ==
=== Regular season and playoffs ===
			Regular season					Playoffs
Season	Team	League	GP	G	A	Pts	PIM	GP	G	A	Pts	PIM
2007–08	Greater Van Canadians U18 AAA	BCEHL U18	40	23	20	43	46	2	0	1	1	0
2008–09	Surrey Eagles	BCHL	26	4	14	18	12	9	1	3	4	2
2008–09	Spokane Chiefs	WHL	7	0	2	2	0	7	0	0	0	0
2009–10	Spokane Chiefs	WHL	63	5	6	11	10	7	0	0	0	9
2010–11	Spokane Chiefs	WHL	63	24	22	46	30	16	2	5	7	12
2011–12	Spokane Chiefs	WHL	29	18	19	37	17	—	—	—	—	—
2011–12	Prince Albert Raiders	WHL	34	18	19	37	16	—	—	—	—	—
2012–13	Prince Albert Raiders	WHL	70	25	32	57	48	4	0	0	0	0
2013–14	University of British Columbia	CIS	28	7	15	22	32	5	2	2	4	0
2014–15	University of British Columbia	CIS	28	5	18	23	34	5	2	4	6	10
2015–16	University of British Columbia	CIS	26	10	17	27	34	2	1	1	2	2
2016–17	University of British Columbia	U Sports	28	14	16	30	18	2	1	1	2	2
2017–18	Asiago	AlpsHL	39	31	25	56	33	14	6	17	23	6
2018–19	Asiago	AlpsHL	40	31	37	68	24	1	0	0	0	27
2019–20	HC Bolzano	EBEL	48	20	19	39	16	3	1	0	1	2
2020–21	HC Bolzano	ICEHL	45	12	16	28	16	16	5	4	9	6
2021–22	HC Pustertal	ICEHL	40	13	27	40	10	4	1	1	2	4
2022–23	HC Pustertal	ICEHL	48	10	12	22	22	—	—	—	—	—
2023–24	Ducs d'Angers	Ligue Magnus	33	6	21	27	22	1	0	0	0	0
2024–25	Orlando Solar Bears	ECHL	67	17	24	41	20	12	5	3	8	10
2025–26	Orlando Solar Bears	ECHL	68	18	26	44	26	—	—	—	—	—
ECHL totals			135	35	50	85	46	12	5	3	8	10

=== International ===
Year	Team	Event	GP	G	A	Pts	PIM
2019	Italy	WC	7	1	0	1	4
2021	Italy	WC	7	1	1	2	4
Senior totals			14	2	1	3	8
