= Cadogan Hall =

Concert hall in Chelsea, London

Coordinates: 51.4936°N 0.1576°W

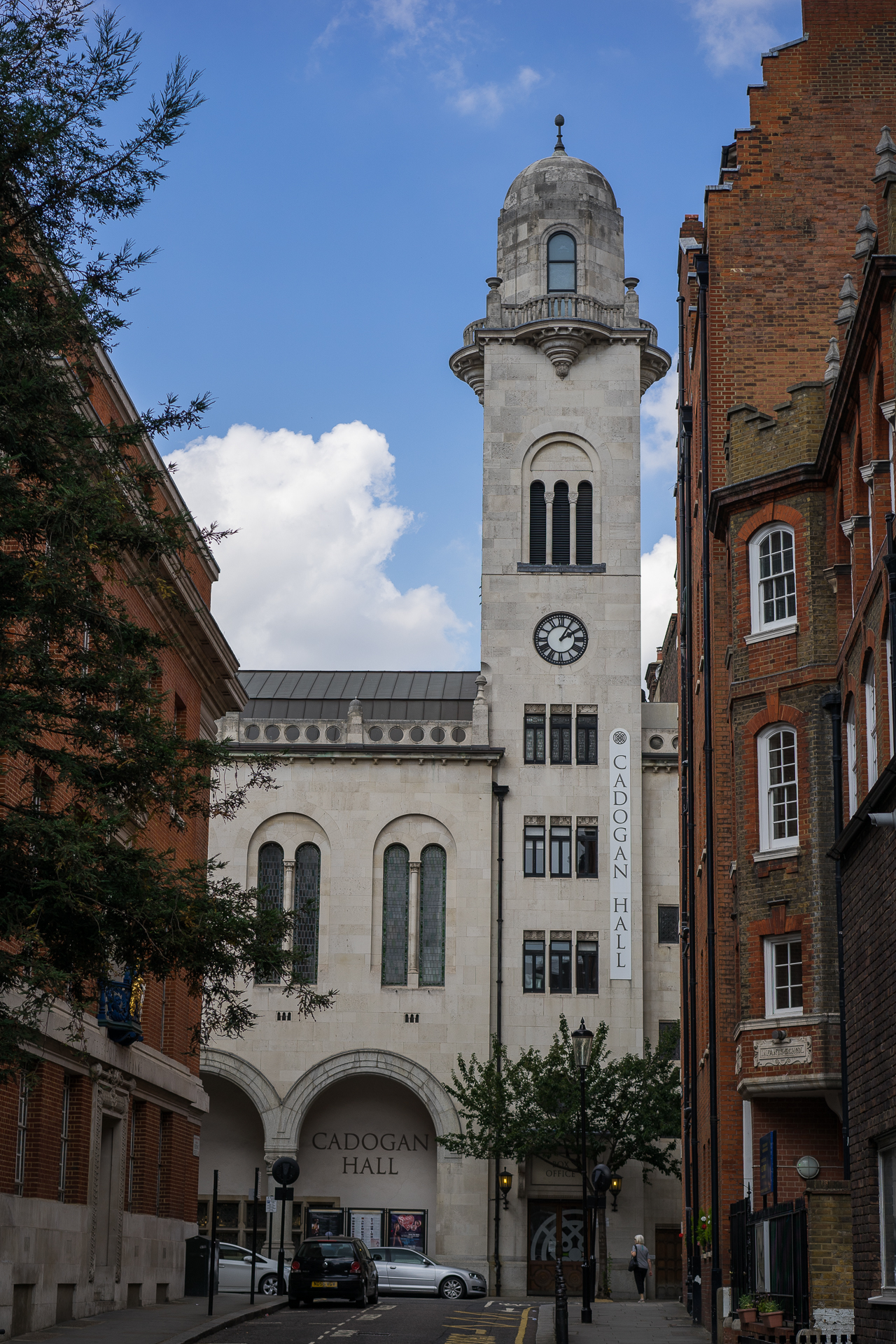

General information
- Type: Concert hall
- Architectural style: Byzantine Revival architecture
- Location: Sloane Terrace, Chelsea, Royal Borough of Kensington and Chelsea, London, England, United Kingdom
- Completed: 1907 (as a church); 2004 (as a concert hall)

Design and construction
- Architects: Robert Fellowes Chisholm (original building); Paul Davis and Partners Architects (2004 conversion)

Other information
- Seating capacity: 953

Website
- cadoganhall.com/

Cadogan Hall /kəˈdʌɡən/ is a 953-seat-capacity concert hall in Sloane Terrace in Chelsea in the Royal Borough of Kensington and Chelsea, London, England.

The resident music ensemble at Cadogan Hall is the Royal Philharmonic Orchestra (RPO). Cadogan Estates offered the RPO the use of the hall as its principal venue in late 2001. The RPO gave its first concert as the resident ensemble of Cadogan Hall in November 2004. From 2005 to 2021 Cadogan Hall was used by the BBC for a handful of Proms concerts.

Cadogan Hall has also been used as a recording venue. In February 2006, a recording of Mozart symphonies with John Eliot Gardiner and the English Baroque Soloists was produced and made available immediately after the performances. In 2009, art rock band Marillion recorded a concert there which was released on the album Live from Cadogan in 2011.

== Building ==
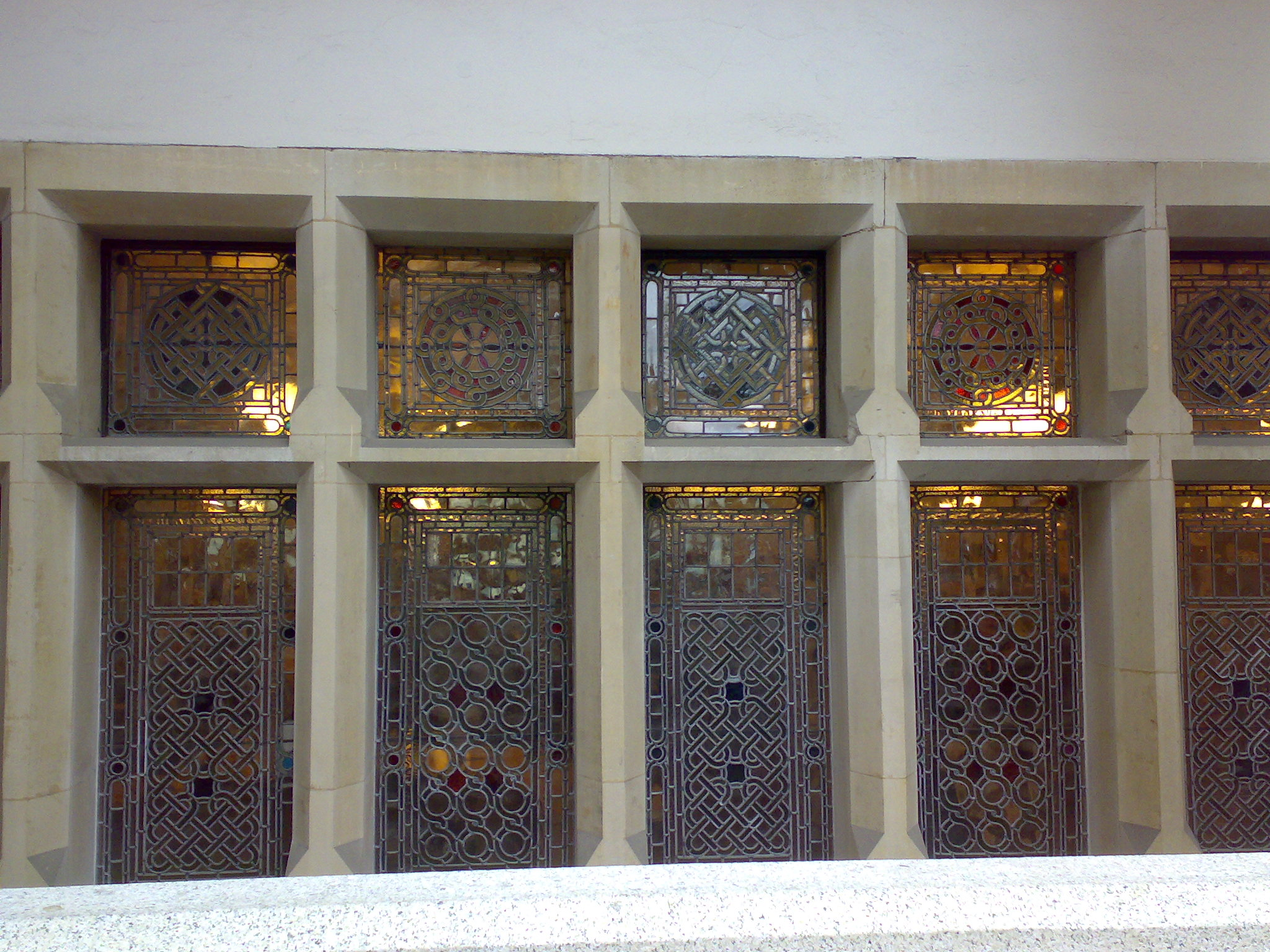
The hall is known for its stained glass windows by Arild Rosenkrantz

The building is a former Church of Christ, Scientist church, completed in 1907 to designs in the Byzantine Revival style by architect Robert Fellowes Chisholm, who also designed the Napier Museum in Kerala, India. The stained glass is by the Danish sculptor and stained-glass artist Arild Rosenkrantz. The building was listed Grade II on the National Heritage List for England in April 1969.

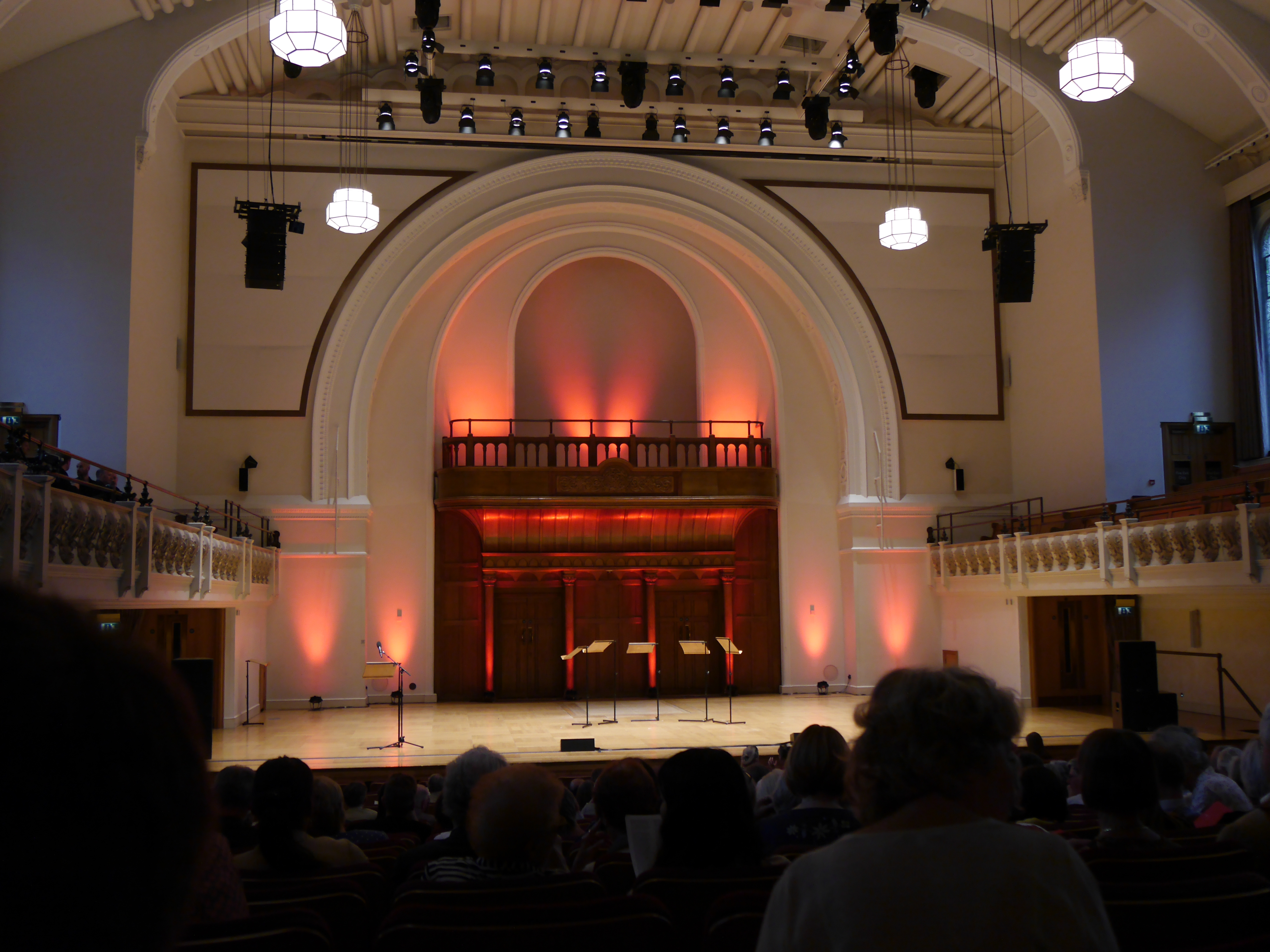
The organ case by J. W. Walker & Sons Ltd

=== Organ ===
The church had a three-manual pipe organ built by J. W. Walker & Sons Ltd in 1907 and installed in 1911. It was on a raised position on the platform. The organ was removed in 2004, and the pipes in 2006. The original intention had been to install the organ in a church in the Midlands, but instead, in 2009-10, it was installed in Christ the King Catholic Church in Gothenburg, Sweden. Walker's organ case remains in place in the concert hall.

== Conversion to a concert hall ==
By 1996, the congregation had diminished dramatically and the building had fallen into disuse. Mohamed Fayed, then owner of Harrods, had acquired the property, but was unable to secure permission to convert the building to a palatial luxury house on account of its status as a listed building. Cadogan Estates Ltd (the property company owned by Earl Cadogan, whose ancestors have been the main landowners in Chelsea since the 18th century; the nearby Cadogan Square and Cadogan Place are also named after them) purchased the building in 2000. It was refurbished in 2004 by Paul Davis and Partners Architects at a cost of £7.5 million. The changes included new lighting and sound systems and bespoke acoustic ceiling modules in the performance space.

== See also ==
- List of concert halls
