= Jesper Vikman =

Swedish ice hockey goaltender

- Born: 11 March 2002 (age 24) Danderyd, Sweden
- Height: 6 ft 4 in (193 cm)
- Weight: 205 lb (93 kg; 14 st 9 lb)
- Position: Goaltender
- Catches: Left
- AHL team (P) Cur. team Former teams: Tucson Roadrunners; Allen Americans (ECHL); AIK; Henderson Silver Knights
- NHL draft: 125th overall, 2020; Vegas Golden Knights
- Playing career: 2019–present

Jesper Vikman (born 11 March 2002) is a Swedish professional ice hockey goaltender for the Allen Americans in the ECHL while under contract to the Tucson Roadrunners of the American Hockey League (AHL). He was selected by the Vegas Golden Knights in the fifth round (125th overall) of the 2020 NHL entry draft.

== Playing career ==
=== Junior ===
Vikman developed within the youth system of AIK in his native Sweden, breaking into professional play during the 2019–20 Allsvenskan season with a brief three-game appearance for the club's senior roster in the HockeyAllsvenskan.

Seeking a transition to North American hockey leagues following his draft selection by the Vegas Golden Knights, Vikman moved to Canada to join the Vancouver Giants of the Western Hockey League (WHL) after being chosen in the CHL Import Draft. He spent two seasons as a starting goaltender for Vancouver, compiling an overall 36–36–3 record. In his final junior campaign (2022–23), he posted a 3.29 goals-against average (GAA) and a .903 save percentage across 45 regular season games, earning a selection to the WHL B.C. Division First All-Star Team.

=== Professional ===
On 10 April 2023, the Golden Knights signed Vikman to a three-year, entry-level contract. He made his professional debut late that season, skating in a single match for the Golden Knights' AHL affiliate, the Henderson Silver Knights.

Vikman spent the subsequent 2023–24 and 2024–25 seasons shifting assignments between Henderson in the AHL and the club's respective ECHL affiliates. Notably, during the 2024–25 season, he backstopped the Tahoe Knight Monsters as their primary netminder during their inaugural season, earning 24 wins in 42 appearances and qualifying for the Kelly Cup Playoffs.

During his third professional season in 2025–26, Vikman made 18 regular season appearances for Henderson before being traded near the NHL trade deadline on 5 March 2026. The Golden Knights package-traded Vikman, alongside a 2027 third-round pick and a 2029 second-round pick, to the Washington Capitals in exchange for depth forward Nic Dowd. Following the transfer, the Capitals initially reassigned Vikman to their AHL affiliate, the Hershey Bears. On 6 April 2026, he was reassigned to Washington's ECHL affiliate, the South Carolina Stingrays, ahead of their 2026 postseason push. He featured in relief in 1 regular season game with the Stingrays before ending the season.

As a free agent from the Capitals, Vikman opted to continue in the AHL by agreeing to a one-year contract with the Tucson Roadrunners, affiliate to the Utah Mammoth on 7 July 2026.

== Personal life ==
Vikman is of dual heritage, born to a Swedish mother and a Finnish father. He is fluent in both Swedish and Finnish, and traditionally features elements of both national flags on his customized goaltending masks to represent his background. He began ice hockey training at six years old in Sweden, committing exclusively to the sport through his childhood years before moving up into the Vallentuna BK and AIK junior athletic systems.

== Career statistics ==
			Regular season									Playoffs
Season	Team	League	GP	W	L	OTL	MIN	GA	SO	GAA	SV%	GP	W	L	MIN	GA	SO	GAA	SV%
2018–19	AIK	J20	3	0	1	0	109	10	0	5.50	.844	—	—	—	—	—	—	—	—
2019–20	AIK	J20	24	10	13	0	1430	73	0	3.06	.902	—	—	—	—	—	—	—	—
2019–20	AIK	Allsv	3	1	2	0	179	10	0	3.35	.901	—	—	—	—	—	—	—	—
2020–21	AIK	J20	9	5	4	0	527	36	0	4.10	.851	—	—	—	—	—	—	—	—
2020–21	AIK	Allsv	5	2	1	0	246	14	0	3.42	.885	—	—	—	—	—	—	—	—
2020–21	Tyresö/Hanviken	Div.1	8	3	5	0	480	24	0	3.00	.897	—	—	—	—	—	—	—	—
2021–22	Vancouver Giants	WHL	35	17	15	2	1968	100	3	3.05	.903	11	6	5	642	37	0	3.46	.903
2022–23	Vancouver Giants	WHL	45	19	21	1	2534	139	1	3.29	.903	4	0	4	238	18	0	4.54	.873
2022–23	Henderson Silver Knights	AHL	1	0	1	0	59	3	0	3.05	.893	—	—	—	—	—	—	—	—
2023–24	Henderson Silver Knights	AHL	15	6	9	0	811	47	0	3.48	.891	—	—	—	—	—	—	—	—
2023–24	Savannah Ghost Pirates	ECHL	15	7	8	0	898	45	0	3.01	.899	—	—	—	—	—	—	—	—
2024–25	Henderson Silver Knights	AHL	7	2	1	2	328	22	1	4.02	.883	—	—	—	—	—	—	—	—
2024–25	Tahoe Knight Monsters	ECHL	42	24	15	3	2445	130	1	3.19	.897	8	4	4	481	23	0	2.87	.914
2025–26	Henderson Silver Knights	AHL	18	8	7	3	985	56	0	3.41	.866	—	—	—	—	—	—	—	—
2025–26	South Carolina Stingrays	ECHL	1	0	0	0	34	1	0	1.75	.929	—	—	—	—	—	—	—	—
AHL totals			41	16	18	5	2183	128	1	3.48	.880	—	—	—	—	—	—	—	—

== Awards and honors ==
Award	Year	Ref.
WHL B.C. Division First All-Star Team	2023	
