= Christ the King Church, Gothenburg =

Coordinates: 57.7043°N 11.9778°E

Christ the King Church
- Kristus Konungens katolska församling
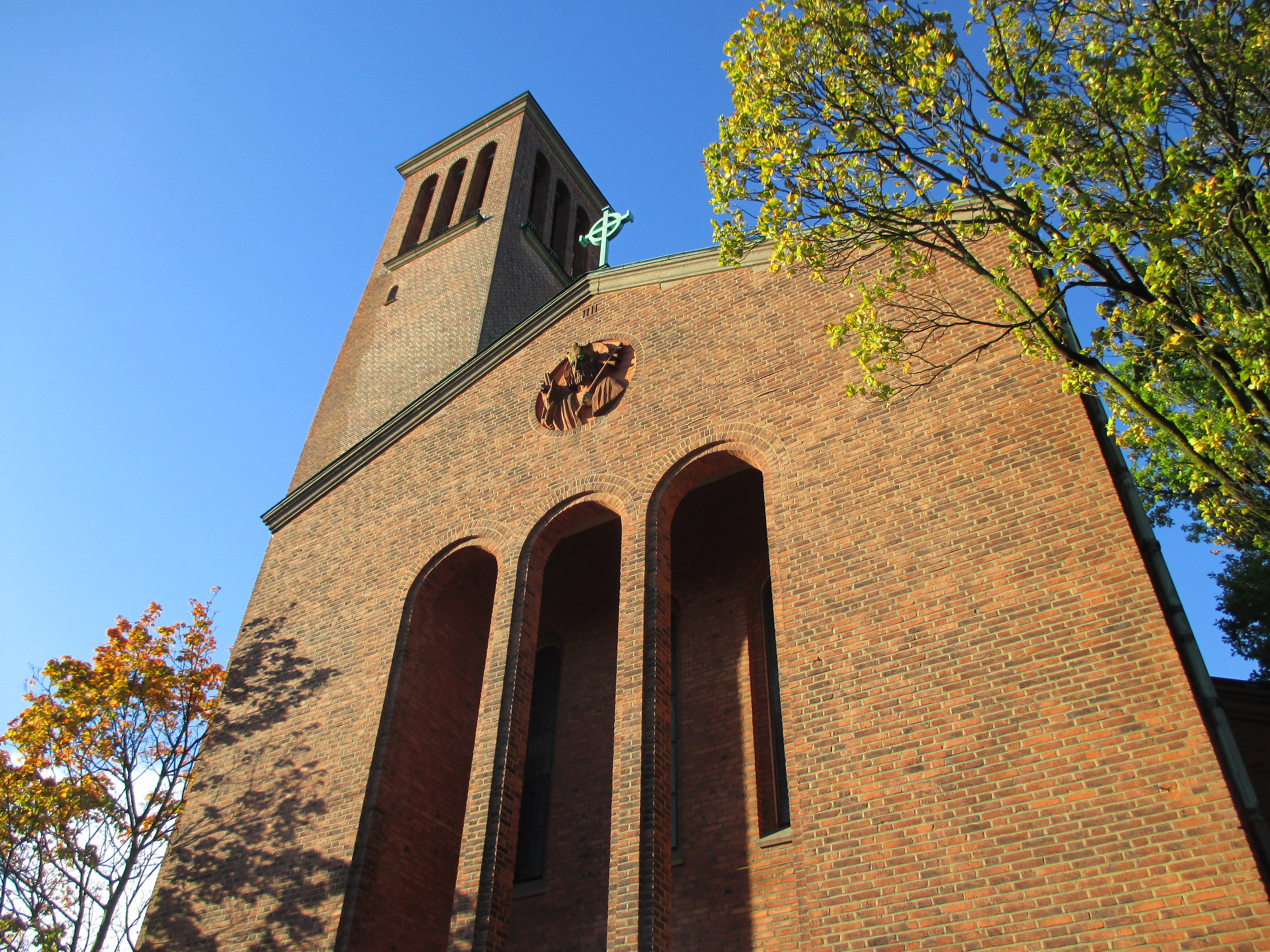
- Christ the King Church
- Location: Gothenburg
- Country: Sweden
- Denomination: Roman Catholic Church

The Christ the King Church (Swedish: Kristus Konungens katolska församling) is the name given to a religious building that is affiliated with the Roman Catholic Church and serves as the parish church belonging to the Catholic Diocese of Stockholm in Sweden. It is located at 14 Parkgatan, in the city of Gothenburg.

The parish was founded in 1862 and is the oldest of the three parishes of Gothenburg. Initially it consisted of fifty faithful. Three years later, the parish had its own initially Gothic church dedicated to Saint Joseph.

In 1928 as the community grew, the parish bought land for a new church, school and rectory. On October 31, 1937, the first stone was laid for the construction of the church on the feast of Christ the King, and October 2, 1938, the first Mass was celebrated.

In 1961, there were about three thousand faithful. In the late 1990s, the parish had more than seven thousand people of different nationalities, thus offering Masses in different languages.

The former pipe organ from the Church of Christ, Scientist in Sloane Square in London was removed from the church when it was converted to a concert hall, Cadogan Hall, and was installed in Christ the King Church. The organ is a three-manual instrument built by J. W. Walker & Sons Ltd in 1907 and originally installed in 1911.

== See also ==
- Roman Catholicism in Sweden
- Roman Catholic Diocese of Stockholm
