= Mark Cavallin =

Canadian-British ice hockey player

- Born: October 20, 1971 (age 54) Mississauga, Ontario, Canada
- Height: 5 ft 9 in (175 cm)
- Weight: 170 lb (77 kg; 12 st 2 lb)
- Position: Goaltender
- Caught: Left
- Played for: Chatham Wheels; Tulsa Oilers; Swindon Ice Lords; Lake Charles Ice Pirates; London Knights; Belfast Giants; Ayr Scottish Eagles; EC Bad Tölz; EV Regensburg
- National team: Canada and Great Britain
- Playing career: 1993–2006

Mark Cavallin (born October 20, 1971) is a Canadian-British former professional ice hockey goaltender. He played in the British Ice Hockey Superleague for the London Knights, Belfast Giants and the Ayr Scottish Eagles. He also played in the German 2nd Bundesliga for the EC Bad Tölz and EV Regensburg. He played for the Great Britain national ice hockey team in two World Championships. He is the father of Luke Cavallin, and Adam Cavallin.
