= Éric Bélanger =

Canadian ice hockey player (born 1977)

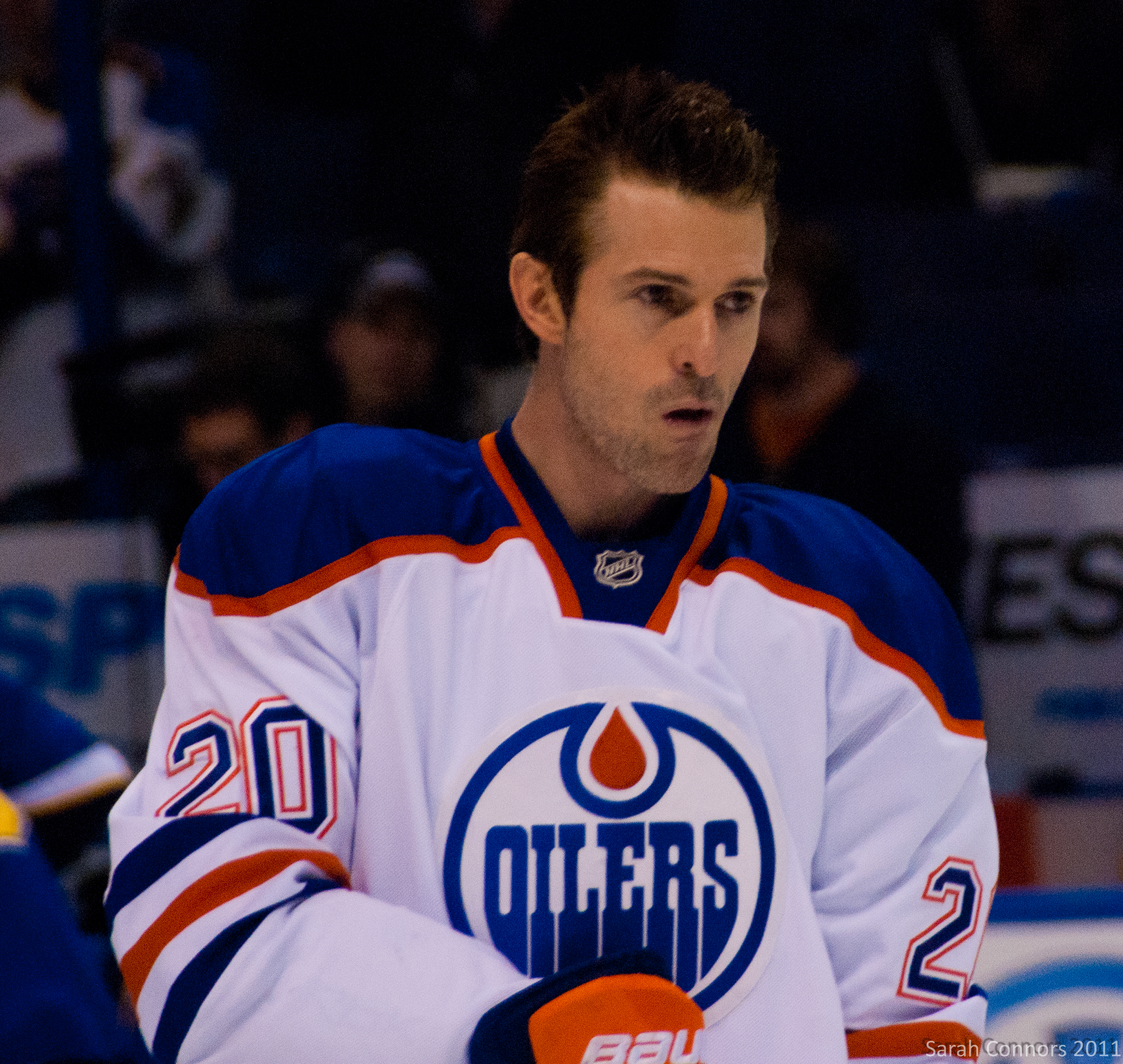
- Bélanger with the Edmonton Oilers in 2012
- Born: December 16, 1977 (age 48) Sherbrooke, Quebec, Canada
- Height: 5 ft 11 in (180 cm)
- Weight: 185 lb (84 kg; 13 st 3 lb)
- Position: Centre
- Shot: Left
- Played for: Los Angeles Kings; HC Bolzano; Carolina Hurricanes; Atlanta Thrashers; Minnesota Wild; Washington Capitals; Phoenix Coyotes; Edmonton Oilers; Avtomobilist Yekaterinburg
- NHL draft: 96th overall, 1996; Los Angeles Kings
- Playing career: 1997–2013

Éric Bélanger (born December 16, 1977) is a Canadian former professional ice hockey player. He played the majority of his professional career as a centre in the National Hockey League (NHL), representing the Los Angeles Kings, Carolina Hurricanes, Atlanta Thrashers, Minnesota Wild, Washington Capitals, Phoenix Coyotes and Edmonton Oilers. He was originally drafted in the fourth round, 96th overall, in the 1996 NHL entry draft by Los Angeles.

In 2021, Bélanger was named the first head coach the Trois-Rivières Lions, an expansion team in the ECHL affiliated with the Montreal Canadiens. He has also served as an assistant coach for the UQTR Patriotes men's ice hockey team.

== Playing career ==
=== Minor hockey ===
As a youth, Bélanger played in the 1991 Quebec International Pee-Wee Hockey Tournament with a minor ice hockey team from Orford, Quebec.

=== Junior hockey ===
==== Beauport Harfangs (1994–1997) ====
Bélanger was selected 35th overall in the third round of the 1994 Quebec Major Junior Hockey League Entry Draft by the Beauport Harfangs. In his first season with Beauport, Bélanger played in 71 games and scored 12 goals and 40 points. In the 1995 QMJHL playoffs, Bélanger scored five goals and 14 points as the Harfangs were eliminated in the semifinals by the Hull Olympiques.

In 1995–96, Bélanger scored 83 points and 35 goals in 59 games. The Harfangs made the playoffs again in 1996, where Bélanger scored 13 goals and 27 points in 20 games as the Harfangs fell in five games in the QMJHL finals to the Granby Predateurs.

Bélanger was selected 96th overall by the Los Angeles Kings in the 1995 NHL entry draft. He played his final season of junior hockey in 1996–97, playing 31 games for Beauport before being moved to the Rimouski Oceanic. He played 31 games for Rimouski, where he scored 26 goals and 67 points for a total of 117 points on the season. In the playoffs, he scored two goals and five points in four games.

=== Professional ===
==== Los Angeles Kings (1997–2006) ====
Bélanger played his first professional season in 1997–98, scoring 17 goals and 51 points in the American Hockey League with the Fredericton Canadiens.

Ahead of the 1998–99 season, the Kings changed AHL affiliations from Fredericton to the Springfield Falcons. In 1998–99, Bélanger scored eight goals and 26 points in 33 games, with his season shortened due to back injuries.

The Kings switched AHL affiliations again for the 1999–2000 season, this time to the Lowell Lock Monsters. Bélanger played 65 games for the Lock Monsters in 1999–2000, tallying 15 goals and 40 points.

Bélanger made his NHL debut with the Kings on October 6, 2000, scoring his first career NHL goal in the second period of a 4–1 win over the Washington Capitals. After ten games in the NHL, the Kings sent him back down to Lowell. Back in Lowell, Bélanger scored 18 points in 13 games before being called back up to the Kings. Bélanger ended his rookie season in Los Angeles with 21 points in 62 games.

The Kings faced the Detroit Red Wings in the first round of the 2001 Stanley Cup Playoffs. After going down 2–0 to start the series, the series shifted back to the Staples Center for games three and four. After the Kings won game three, game four seemed out of reach as the Red Wings surged to a 3–0 lead through the first two periods. The Kings got on the scoreboard when Scott Thomas scored on the power play at 13:53 into the third period, Jozef Stümpel added a second on the power play with under three minutes left with the Kings' net empty. The Kings tied the game on a Bryan Smolinski wrist shot with 53 seconds remaining. In overtime, Kings forward Adam Deadmarsh centred a pass to Bélanger in front of the net, before Bélanger slotted the puck in for the overtime winner. This game would later be dubbed the "Frenzy on Figueroa." With the series now tied 2–2, the series momentum had shifted the Kings' way. Bélanger, a rookie at the time, later said, "It just gave us confidence. We knew at that point we could play with those guys." The Kings went on to win the next two games and eliminate the Red Wings to advance to the second round of the playoffs, where they fell in seven games to the Colorado Avalanche after coming back from down 3–1 to force a game seven.

The 2001–02 season began with tragedy for the Kings, as team scouts Garnet "Ace" Bailey and Mark Bavis were both killed in the September 11 attacks. 2001–02 was Bélanger's first full season in the NHL, he played 53 games for the Kings and notched eight goals and 24 points. He led the Kings with a 57.7% face-off percentage, good for seventh-best in the NHL in 2001–02. The Kings made the playoffs again, meeting and losing to the Colorado Avalanche in seven games for the second year in a row, this time in the first round. Bélanger did not register a point in the seven games played in the series.

In 2002–03, Bélanger played 62 games and scored 16 goals and 19 assists for 35 points. He scored his first career hat-trick on December 17 against the St. Louis Blues.

Bélanger recorded his first season playing 80 or more games in 2003–04, scoring 13 goals and 20 assists for the Kings in 81 games played.

With the 2004–05 season cancelled due to the NHL lockout, Bélanger played for HC Bolzano of the Italian Serie A. He played 12 games for the Italian outfit, scoring 13 goals and 10 assists.

Bélanger played in 65 games for the Kings in 2005–06, finishing the season with 17 goals and 37 points.

==== Carolina Hurricanes (2006–2007) ====
On September 29, 2006, the Kings traded Bélanger, along with Tim Gleason, to the Carolina Hurricanes in exchange for prospect Jack Johnson and defenceman Oleg Tverdovsky.

Bélanger joined the reigning Stanley Cup champions for the first four months of the 2006–07 season, later describing his 56 games with Carolina as "a mess."

==== Atlanta Thrashers (2007) ====
On February 9, 2007, Bélanger was traded by the Hurricanes to the Nashville Predators in exchange for Josef Vasicek. On February 10, 2007, the very next day, Bélanger was traded again, this time to the Atlanta Thrashers for defenceman Vitaly Vishnevski. He played the remainder of the season with Atlanta, scoring nine goals and 15 points. In the Thrashers' first round playoff series against the New York Rangers, he scored one goal as the Thrashers were swept by New York.

==== Minnesota Wild (2007–2010) ====
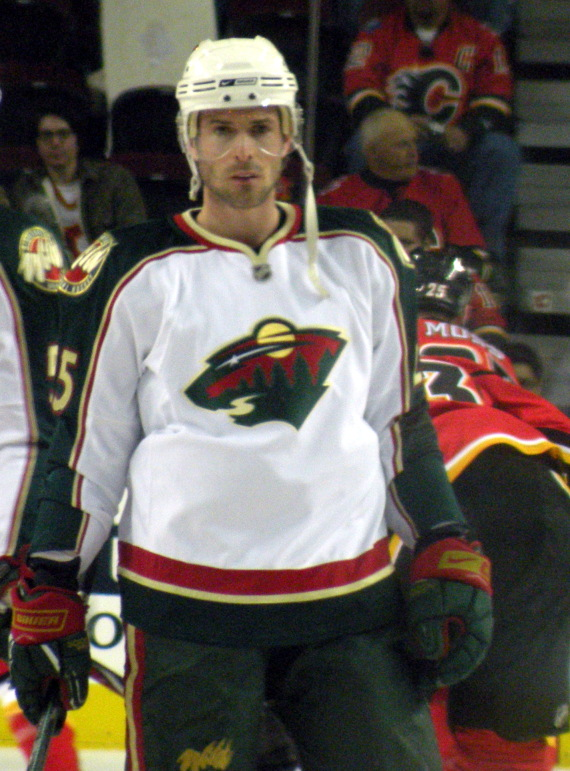
Bélanger with the Minnesota Wild in 2009.

On July 3, 2007, Bélanger signed a three-year free agent contract with the Minnesota Wild. In his first season with Minnesota, he scored 37 points, tying his career-high, and set a new career high in assists with 24. He played six games in the WIld's first round playoff series against the Colorado Avalanche, failing to register a point as the Wild were eliminated in six games by Colorado.

In the 2008–09 season, Bélanger scored 13 goals and 36 points for the Wild. He played in his 500th career NHL game on December 1 in a 6–5 loss to Colorado. He scored his 100th career NHL in a 4–0 win over the St. Louis Blues on December 3.

Bélanger began the 2009–10 season with the Minnesota Wild, playing 60 games for the Wild, notching 13 goals and 35 points.

On March 3, 2010, the NHL trade deadline, Bélanger was traded to the Washington Capitals in exchange for a second-round pick in the 2010 NHL entry draft. In the 2009–10 season, he recorded a career-high in points with 41 across his time with Minnesota and Washington. In Game 5 of the Capitals' 2010 playoff series against the Montreal Canadiens, Bélanger took a high stick to the mouth from Canadiens defenceman Marc-André Bergeron, which resulted in Bélanger losing nine teeth. Moments after the hit, the game telecast showed Bélanger on the bench removing a loose tooth from his mouth, using just his fingers and a piece of gauze. Bélanger said after the game, "I knew I was in trouble, but what are you going to do? It’s the playoffs."

==== Phoenix Coyotes (2010–2011) ====
On September 14, 2010, Bélanger signed a one-year free agent contract with the Phoenix Coyotes, reportedly worth $750,000. He played in all 82 games for the Coyotes in the 2010–11 season, tallying 13 goals and 40 points. He recorded zero points and tso penalty minutes as the Coyotes were swept by the Detroit Red Wings in the first round of the 2011 Stanley Cup playoffs.

==== Edmonton Oilers (2011–2013) ====
Bélanger signed a three-year, $5.25 million contract with the Edmonton Oilers on July 1, 2011. In his first season in Edmonton, however, he set offensive career-lows, scoring just four goals and 12 assists, the lowest totals in both categories in his NHL career to that point.

During the lockout-shortened 2012–13 season, Bélanger suffered a second successive disappointing year going without a goal in 26 games for the Oilers. On July 4, 2013, he was placed on unconditional waivers for a compliance buyout from the final year of his contract with the Oilers.

==== Avtomobilist Yekatrinburg (2013) ====
On July 15, 2013, Bélanger left the NHL and signed a one-year contract abroad in Russia with Avtomobilist Yekaterinburg of the Kontinental Hockey League (KHL). He played in just seven games with Avtomobilist in the 2013–14 season, before opting to return to North America and retire from professional hockey on September 25, 2013.

== Coaching career ==
=== Trois-Rivières Lions (2021–2022) ===
In 2021, Bélanger was hired as the first head coach of the Trois-Rivières Lions of the ECHL ahead of the Lions' inaugural 2021–22 season. Bélanger coached the Lions to a 34–29–5–1 record in their first season, along with the team's first ever playoff berth. On November 22, 2022, Bélanger resigned from his role as head coach of the Lions, citing "personal reasons."

=== Drummondville Voltigeurs (2022–2023) ===
The next day, on November 23, 2022, Bélanger was hired as head coach of the Drummondville Voltigeurs of the QMJHL. On June 2, 2023, Bélanger was let go as head coach of the Drummondville Voltigeurs after coaching the team to a 29–34–4–1 season.

=== UQTR Patriotes (2023–2024) ===
Bélanger was brought on as an assistant coach of the UQTR Patriotes men's ice hockey team for the 2023–24 USports hockey season. Bélanger was part of the coaching staff when the Patriotes won the 2024 Queen's Cup as champions of the OUA. He did not return for the 2024–25 season.

== Personal life ==
Bélanger and his wife, Alexandra, have two daughters: Oceanne and Lola Pearl.

== Career statistics ==
			Regular season					Playoffs
Season	Team	League	GP	G	A	Pts	PIM	GP	G	A	Pts	PIM
1994–95	Beauport Harfangs	QMJHL	71	12	28	40	24	18	5	9	14	25
1995–96	Beauport Harfangs	QMJHL	59	35	48	83	18	20	13	14	27	6
1996–97	Beauport Harfangs	QMJHL	31	13	37	50	30	—	—	—	—	—
1996–97	Rimouski Océanic	QMJHL	31	26	41	67	36	—	—	—	—	—
1997–98	Fredericton Canadiens	AHL	56	17	34	51	28	4	2	1	3	2
1998–99	Long Beach Ice Dogs	IHL	1	0	0	0	0	—	—	—	—	—
1998–99	Springfield Falcons	AHL	33	8	18	26	10	3	0	1	1	2
1999–00	Lowell Lock Monsters	AHL	65	15	25	40	20	7	3	3	6	2
2000–01	Lowell Lock Monsters	AHL	13	8	10	18	4	—	—	—	—	—
2000–01	Los Angeles Kings	NHL	62	9	12	21	16	13	1	4	5	2
2001–02	Los Angeles Kings	NHL	53	8	16	24	21	7	0	0	0	4
2002–03	Los Angeles Kings	NHL	62	16	19	35	26	—	—	—	—	—
2003–04	Los Angeles Kings	NHL	81	13	20	33	44	—	—	—	—	—
2004–05	Bolzano-Bozen Foxes	Serie A	12	13	10	23	20	—	—	—	—	—
2005–06	Los Angeles Kings	NHL	65	17	20	37	62	—	—	—	—	—
2006–07	Carolina Hurricanes	NHL	56	8	12	20	14	—	—	—	—	—
2006–07	Atlanta Thrashers	NHL	24	9	6	15	12	4	1	0	1	12
2007–08	Minnesota Wild	NHL	75	13	24	37	30	6	0	0	0	4
2008–09	Minnesota Wild	NHL	79	13	23	36	26	—	—	—	—	—
2009–10	Minnesota Wild	NHL	60	13	22	35	28	—	—	—	—	—
2009–10	Washington Capitals	NHL	17	2	4	6	4	7	0	1	1	4
2010–11	Phoenix Coyotes	NHL	82	13	27	40	36	4	0	0	0	2
2011–12	Edmonton Oilers	NHL	78	4	12	16	32	—	—	—	—	—
2012–13	Edmonton Oilers	NHL	26	0	3	3	10	—	—	—	—	—
2013–14	Avtomobilist Yekaterinburg	KHL	7	0	0	0	4	—	—	—	—	—
NHL totals			820	138	220	358	361	41	2	5	7	28
