= Jack Dugan =

American ice hockey player (born 1998)

- Born: March 24, 1998 (age 28) Pittsburgh, Pennsylvania, U.S.
- Height: 6 ft 2 in (188 cm)
- Weight: 185 lb (84 kg; 13 st 3 lb)
- Position: Left wing
- Shoots: Right
- DEL2 team Former teams: Bietigheim Steelers; Henderson Silver Knights; Utica Comets; Chicago Wolves
- NHL draft: 142nd overall, 2017; Vegas Golden Knights
- Playing career: 2021–present

Jonathan "Jack" Dugan (born March 24, 1998) is an American professional ice hockey left winger for the Bietigheim Steelers of the DEL2.

He went to High School in Rochester, New York at McQuaid Jesuit High School. His brother, Joe Dugan, is the head coach of the McQuaid Jesuit Ice Hockey Team in Section V.

== Early life ==
Dugan was born on March 24, 1998, to parents Lisa and Joe Dugan. His father Joe played hockey at McQuaid Jesuit High School and Washington & Jefferson College. Growing up in Rochester, New York, Dugan and his family regularly attended collegiate ice hockey games at the Rochester Institute of Technology.

== Playing career ==
=== Amateur ===
While being raised in Rochester, Dugan played Tier 1 youth hockey for the Rochester Monarchs program before entering high school. Dugan spent two seasons at McQuaid Jesuit High School where his father served as an English teacher. Although he was offered opportunities within the Ontario Hockey League, Dugan chose to maintain his NCAA eligibility. During his junior year at McQuaid, he helped them win the Division 1 state championship after he tallied 65 points through 24 games. As a result of his play, Dugan was named the 2015 New York High School Player of the Year. Following the 2014–15 season, Dugan transferred to the Northwood School in Lake Placid, New York, where he was named to the United States High School All USA Hockey Third Team. In his senior year, Dugan committed to play for Providence College following a season in the United States Hockey League.

=== Collegiate ===
During his sophomore season, Dugan led the NCAA in scoring with 52 points and was named to the AHCA First All-American Team and the Hockey East First All-Star Team. He was also one of the finalists for the Hobey Baker Award. Dugan was selected 142nd overall by the Vegas Golden Knights in the 2017 NHL entry draft.

=== Professional ===
On May 11, 2020, Dugan concluded his collegiate career as he was signed by the Vegas Golden Knights to a two-year, entry-level contract.

Released as a free agent from the Golden Knights following his entry-level contract, Dugan agreed to a one-year, two-way contract with the New Jersey Devils on July 13, 2022. Assigned to begin the 2022–23 season in the AHL with affiliate, the Utica Comets, Dugan posted 11 goals and 27 points in 51 regular season games. On March 10, 2023, Dugan was traded by the Devils to the Carolina Hurricanes in exchange for Zack Hayes.

After two prolific offensive seasons in the ECHL with the Fort Wayne Komets, Dugan opted to pursue a career abroad in agreeing to a one-year contract with German second tier club, Bietigheim Steelers of the DEL2 on May 29, 2025.

== Career statistics ==
			Regular season					Playoffs
Season	Team	League	GP	G	A	Pts	PIM	GP	G	A	Pts	PIM
2015–16	Northwood School	USHS-Prep	49	24	29	53	—	—	—	—	—	—
2016–17	Northwood School	USHS-Prep	47	28	52	80	—	—	—	—	—	—
2017–18	Chicago Steel	USHL	54	31	35	66	104	7	2	6	8	4
2018–19	Providence College	HE	41	10	29	39	48	—	—	—	—	—
2019–20	Providence College	HE	34	10	42	52	64	—	—	—	—	—
2020–21	Henderson Silver Knights	AHL	37	10	23	33	26	5	3	1	4	2
2021–22	Henderson Silver Knights	AHL	35	6	12	18	21	—	—	—	—	—
2022–23	Utica Comets	AHL	51	11	16	27	37	—	—	—	—	—
2022–23	Chicago Wolves	AHL	8	0	2	2	4	—	—	—	—	—
2023–24	Fort Wayne Komets	ECHL	70	20	60	80	169	—	—	—	—	—
2024–25	Fort Wayne Komets	ECHL	70	23	53	76	129	13	5	10	15	18
2025-26	SC Bietigheim Steelers	DEL2	51	25	42	67	113	13	6	18	24	18
AHL totals			131	27	53	80	88	5	3	1	4	2

== Awards and honors ==
Award	Year	Ref
College
AHCA First Team All-American	2020	
Hockey East All-Rookie Team	2019	
Hockey East First All-Star Team	2020	
USHL
All-USHL First Team	2018	

Awards and achievements
Preceded by Taro Hirose / Alex Limoges	NCAA Ice Hockey Scoring Champion; 2019–20	Succeeded by Cole Caufield
Preceded by Mitchell Chaffee	Hockey East Scoring Champion; 2019–20	Succeeded by Jonny Evans
