= Trois-Rivières Lions =

Canadian professional minor league ice hockey team

Trois-Rivières Lions Lions de Trois-Rivières
- City: Trois-Rivières, Quebec
- League: ECHL
- Conference: Eastern
- Division: North
- Founded: 2021
- Home arena: Colisée Vidéotron
- Colours: Metal grey, Quebec blue
- Owner: Spire Sports + Entertainment
- General manager: Ron Choules
- Head coach: Ron Choules
- Affiliates: Montreal Canadiens (NHL); Laval Rocket (AHL)
- Website: lions3r.com

Franchise history
- 2021–present: Trois-Rivières Lions

Championships
- Division titles: 1 (2024–25)
- Conference titles: 1 (2024–25)
- Kelly Cups: 1 (2024–25)

The Trois-Rivières Lions (French: Lions de Trois-Rivières) are a Canadian professional minor league ice hockey team in the ECHL based in Trois-Rivières, Quebec. The team began play in the 2021–22 season, with home games held at Colisée Vidéotron. They are affiliated with the Montreal Canadiens of the National Hockey League, and the Laval Rocket of the American Hockey League. The Lions won the Kelly Cup in the 2024–25 ECHL season.

== History ==
With construction beginning in early 2020 to replace the aging Colisée de Trois-Rivières, Dean MacDonald, majority owner of the Newfoundland Growlers (through his group Deacon Sports and Entertainment (DSE)), came to an agreement with Trois-Rivières city officials to place an ECHL franchise in Colisée Vidéotron for the 2021–22 season. In November 2020, the team finalized its lease agreement. Subsequently, the Lions organization was approved by the league's board of governors in January 2021. That same month, the Montreal Canadiens announced that the foregoing would serve as their ECHL affiliate.

In June 2021, the team name was announced as the Trois-Rivières Lions, a homage to the only previous professional team to play in the city, the Trois-Rivières Lions, from 1955 to 1960. Days later, Éric Bélanger was appointed as the team's inaugural head coach.

In early 2024, DSE was experiencing financial difficulties, and owed the city of Trois-Rivières nearly CA$1 million in arena back rent. In April 2024, the Growlers also owned by DSE, ceased operations. The ECHL took temporary ownership of the Lions pending the sale of the franchise to new ownership, allowing the team to complete the 2023–24 season. A week later, the league approved the purchase of the Lions by American businessman Jeff Dickerson via his company Spire Sports + Entertainment (SS+E).

During the 2024–25 season, the team set a single-season high for wins, earned their first divisional title, and won the 2025 Kelly Cup playoffs.

== Season-by-season results ==
Regular season										Playoffs			
Season	GP	W	L	OTL	SOL	Pts	GF	GA	Standing	1st round	2nd round	3rd round	Kelly Cup
2021–22	69	34	29	5	1	74	230	233	3rd, North	L, 3–4, NFL	—	—	—
2022–23	72	29	40	3	0	61	216	273	6th, North	Did not qualify			
2023–24	69	31	30	5	3	70	204	229	3rd, North	L, 2–4, NOR	—	—	—
2024–25	72	45	19	6	2	98	251	186	1st, North	W, 4–0, REA	W, 4–2, NOR	W, 4–2, FLA	W, 4–1, TOL
2025–26	72	35	30	3	4	77	207	203	5th, North	Did not qualify			

== Players and personnel ==
=== Team captains ===
- Cédric Montminy, 2021–2024
- Morgan Adams-Moisan, 2024–present

=== Head coaches ===
- Éric Bélanger, Jun. 2021–Nov. 2022
- Marc-André Bergeron (interim), Nov. 2022–Jun. 2023
- Pascal Rhéaume (resigned prior to season), Jun. 2023–Aug. 2023
- Ron Choules, Aug. 2023–present

=== Notable players ===
The following alumni have advanced to play in the National Hockey League (NHL) after playing for the Lions as of the conclusion of the 2023–24 season:

- Pierrick Dubé
- Cameron Hillis
- Artūrs Šilovs

== See also ==
- List of ice hockey teams in Quebec
