= Colisée Vidéotron =

Hockey arena in Quebec, Canada

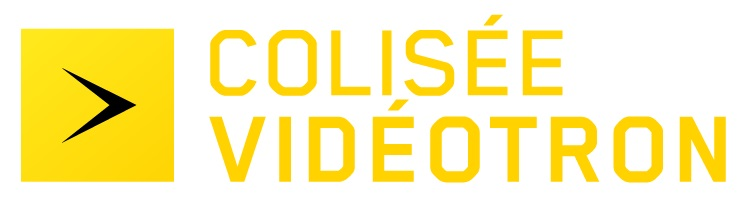

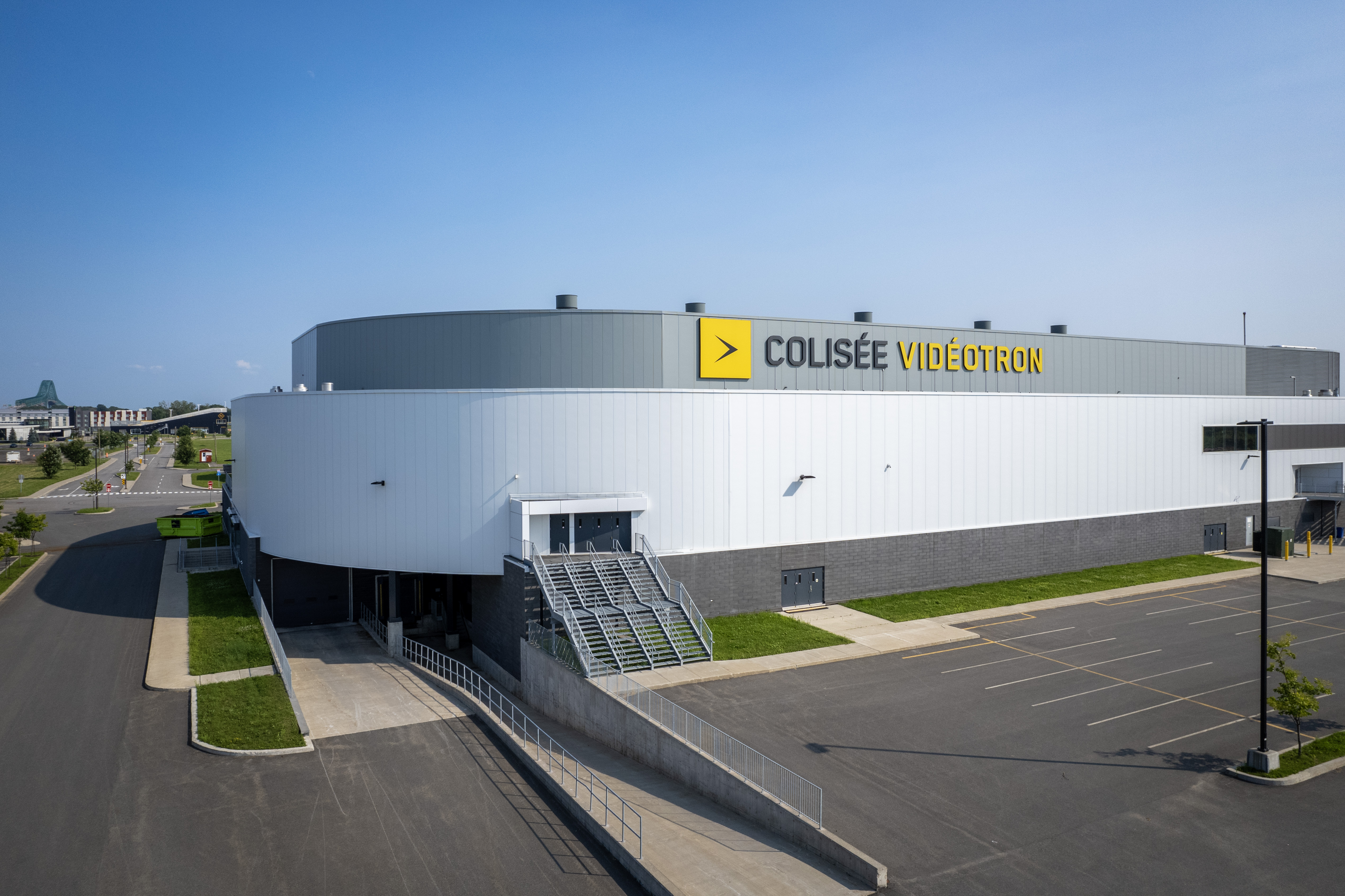
- Colisée Vidéotron
- Interactive map of Colisée Vidéotron
- Location: Trois-Rivières, Quebec, Canada
- Coordinates: 46.3215311°N 72.5906657°W
- Owner: City of Trois-Rivières
- Operator: Spectra Venue Management
- Capacity: 4,390

Construction
- Groundbreaking: June 2018
- Opened: September 12, 2021
- Cost: CA$60.6 million

Tenant
- Trois-Rivières Lions (ECHL) (2021–present)

Website
- www.v3r.net/activites-et-loisirs/installations-sportives-et-recreatives/colisee-videotron

Colisée Vidéotron is a multi-purpose arena in Trois-Rivières, Quebec, Canada. Opened in September 2021, the arena replaced the aging Colisée de Trois-Rivières and seats 4,390 fans. Starting with the 2021–22 season, its main tenant is the Trois-Rivières Lions professional hockey team in the ECHL.

== History ==
In the late 2010s, the city of Trois-Rivières, began construction on new arena to replace the Colisée de Trois-Rivières, a skating rink that first opened in 1938 and was primarily acting as the home of the UQTR Patriotes hockey teams. The new arena cost CA$60 million to construct with a planned opening of late 2020, but had no announced permanent tenants scheduled after UQTR declined the initial lease. Amidst the COVID-19 pandemic in Quebec, the planned opening was moved back to early 2021 while the city was in discussions with adding an ECHL expansion team expected to be affiliated with the Montreal Canadiens. In January 2021, the team was approved to begin play for the 2021–22 season.

On June 10, 2021, the team name was announced as the Trois-Rivières Lions, named after the only previous professional team to play in the city, the Trois-Rivières Lions, from 1955 to 1960. On June 15, Éric Bélanger was named the team's first head coach.

On September 9, 2021, an agreement between Quebecor and the Lions was made to name the arena Colisée Vidéotron for a period of five years. The negotiated amount was not disclosed.
