= Colisée Jean-Guy Talbot =

Arena in Trois-Rivières, Quebec, Canada

Coordinates: 46°20′52″N 72°33′32″W

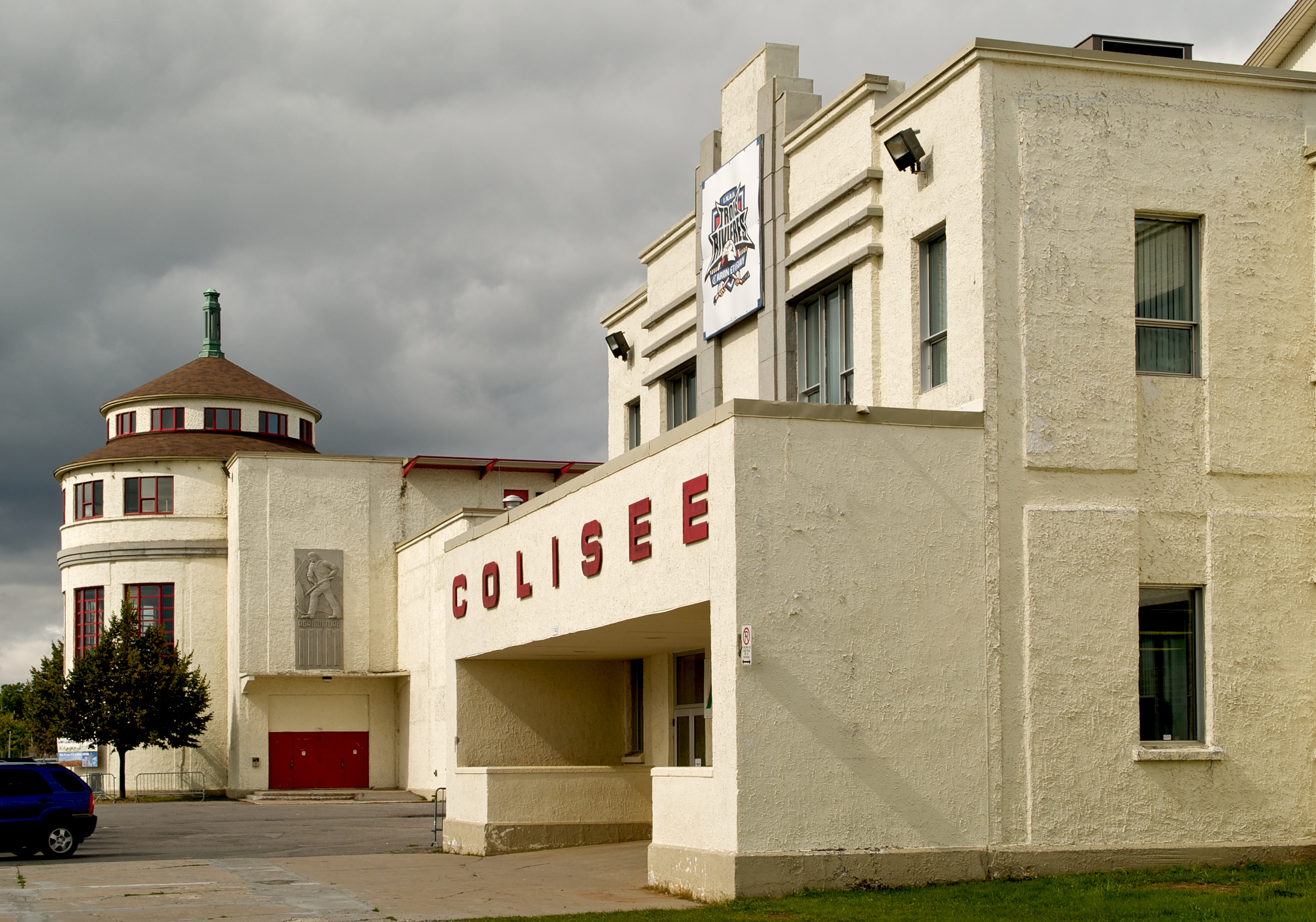
- Interactive map of Colisée Jean-Guy Talbot
- Location: Trois-Rivières, Quebec
- Capacity: 3,500
- Surface: Artificial ice

Construction
- Opened: 1938

Tenants
- Trois-Rivières Ducs/Draveurs (QMJHL) (1969–1992); Trois-Rivières Caron & Guay/Vikings/Blizzard/Draveurs (LNAH) (2004–2018); UQTR Patriotes (CIS)

The Colisée Jean-Guy Talbot (known as Colisée de Trois-Rivières until 2021) is an arena in Trois-Rivières, Quebec, Canada. It has a capacity of 3,500, with 2,700 seated. It opened in 1938. The Colisée was home to the Trois-Rivières Draveurs of the QMJHL from 1969 to 1992. From 2004 to 2018, the building hosted an LNAH franchise that went by many names but was also called the Draveurs when it ceased operations. It is the home venue of the UQTR Patriotes university hockey team.

In the late 2010s, construction started on Colisée Vidéotron in District 55, which opened in September 2021.
