= Norfolk Admirals (ECHL) =

- City: Norfolk, Virginia
- League: ECHL
- Conference: Eastern
- Division: North
- Founded: 1995
- Home arena: Norfolk Scope
- Colors
- Owner: Patrick Grasso
- Head coach: Jeff Carr
- Media: WGNT CW Norfolk
- Website: norfolkadmirals.com

Franchise history
- 1995–1998: Bakersfield Fog
- 1998–2015: Bakersfield Condors
- 2015–present: Norfolk Admirals

The Norfolk Admirals are a professional ice hockey team in the ECHL that began play in the 2015–16 season. Based in Norfolk, Virginia, the team plays its home games at Norfolk Scope. The Admirals replaced the American Hockey League (AHL) team of the same name, which played from 2000 until 2015, after which they moved to San Diego, California, and became the current incarnation of the San Diego Gulls.

== History ==
On January 29, 2015, the Anaheim Ducks announced that they would be moving their AHL affiliate, the Norfolk Admirals, to San Diego as one of five charter members of the AHL's new Pacific Division. The next day, the Edmonton Oilers announced that their outgoing ECHL team, the Bakersfield Condors (who would also be supplanted by a new Bakersfield Condors in the AHL), would move to Norfolk and take on the Admirals name and logo. The Oilers Entertainment Group had originally purchased the ECHL Condors in January 2014, one year prior to the announcement of the relocation.

Admirals hockey in Norfolk actually began in the ECHL, where the Hampton Roads Admirals played from 1989 until 2000, when the ownership group purchased an AHL franchise license, changed the name to the Norfolk Admirals, and began play as an AHL expansion team starting with the 2000–01 season. The original ECHL Admirals' run was very successful, winning three titles – the Riley Cup in 1991 and 1992 and the Kelly Cup in 1998, an ECHL record which has since been broken by the Florida Everblades with their recent 5th championship following the 2025-2026 season.

After one season, the Oilers announced they had sold the Admirals franchise to the Mango Media Group. The Admirals continued the Oilers affiliation under the new ownership for the rest of the 2016–17 season. In 2017–18, the Admirals left the Oilers' organization and affiliated with the Nashville Predators. On June 1, 2017, the Admirals revealed their new logo, which is similar to the logo of the original Admirals ECHL team and had similar colors to their new NHL affiliate. However, on November 28, 2017, the team announced that it has ended its affiliation agreement with the Predators after only 19 games during the 2017–18 season. The Admirals finished the season independent of any official affiliations and failed to make the playoffs for the third straight season.

Prior to the 2018–19 season, the Admirals re-signed head coach Robbie Ftorek on a two-year contract and affiliated with the Arizona Coyotes. Following an average attendance of 2,602 in 2017–18, the lowest recorded attendance in any iteration of the Admirals' history, the Admirals saw increased attendance in its fourth ECHL season to an average of 3,590 in 2018–19.

After the 2018–19 season, former Hampton Roads Admirals' player Patrick Cavanagh led a group that purchased the Admirals from Mango Media Group. Cavanagh then named another Hampton Roads' player Rod Taylor as the head coach, while releasing Ftorek from his contract. The Admirals entered the 2019–20 season as the only ECHL team without an official NHL affiliate and were in last place when the season was curtailed due the COVID-19 pandemic. The team then opted out of participating in the 2020–21 season due to the ongoing restrictions on arena capacity.

On August 27, 2021, the Admirals announced an affiliation agreement with the Carolina Hurricanes for the 2021–22 season. The addition of the Savannah Ghost Pirates moved the Admirals into the North Division in the 2022–23 season.

On August 25, 2023, the Admirals announced a new affiliation with the Winnipeg Jets of the NHL and Manitoba Moose of the AHL for the 2023–24 season. After missing the playoffs since joining the ECHL, the Admirals made it back for the 2023–24 and 2024–25 seasons losing in the North Division Finals in both seasons.

With the success on the ice the Admirals also saw success in the stands as well. Average attendance began to grow each season with an average of 5,048 during the 2025–26 season.

On July 8, 2026, the Admirals announced the end of their three-season affiliation with the Winnipeg Jets and Manitoba Moose. They chose to compete in the 2026–27 season unaffiliated with any NHL or AHL club.

== Season-by-season records ==
Regular season											Playoffs				
Season	GP	W	L	OTL	SOL	Pts	GF	GA	PIM	Standing	Year	1st round	2nd round	3rd round	Kelly Cup
2015–16	72	30	37	4	1	65	201	232	1193	5th, East Div.	2016	did not qualify			
2016–17	72	26	40	6	0	58	214	271	868	7th, South Div.	2017	did not qualify			
2017–18	72	26	39	6	1	59	211	269	803	6th, South Div.	2018	did not qualify			
2018–19	72	27	36	6	3	63	218	278	1003	6th, South Div.	2019	did not qualify			
2019–20	60	14	38	8	0	36	149	248	836	7th, South Div.	2020	Season cancelled			
2020–21	Opted out of participating due to the COVID-19 pandemic										2021	did not participate			
2021–22	72	29	37	3	3	64	204	261	1267	6th, South Div.	2022	did not qualify			
2022–23	72	21	46	2	3	47	203	318	995	7th, North Div.	2023	did not qualify			
2023–24	69	41	21	6	1	89	245	199	1490	2nd, North Div.	2024	W, 4–2, TRL	L, 2–4, ADR	—	—
2024–25	72	40	25	6	1	87	251	210	1034	3rd, North Div.	2025	W, 4–1, WHL	L, 2–4, TRL	—	—
2025–26	72	30	38	4	0	64	211	250	907	7th, North Div.	2026	did not qualify			

== Players ==
=== Notable NHL alumni ===
List of Norfolk Admirals alumni who played more than 25 games in Norfolk and 25 or more games in the National Hockey League.

- Ian White
- Olaf Kolzig
