= 2024–25 ECHL season =

Ice hockey league season

- League: ECHL
- Sport: Ice hockey
- Duration: October 18, 2024 – April 13, 2025

Regular season
- Brabham Cup: South Carolina Stingrays
- Season MVP: Brandon Hawkins (Toledo)
- Top scorer: Brandon Hawkins (Toledo)

Playoffs
- Eastern champions: Trois-Rivières Lions
- Eastern runners-up: Florida Everblades
- Western champions: Toledo Walleye
- Western runners-up: Kansas City Mavericks
- Playoffs MVP: Luke Cavallin (Trois-Rivières)

Kelly Cup
- Champions: Trois-Rivières Lions
- Runners-up: Toledo Walleye

ECHL seasons
- ← 2023–24 2025–26 →

The 2024–25 ECHL season was the 37th season of the ECHL. The regular season began on October 18, 2024, and ended on April 13, 2025, with the 2025 Kelly Cup playoffs to follow. Twenty-nine teams affiliated with an NHL team in 22 states and one Canadian province played 72 games.

On June 7, the Trois-Rivières Lions won their first Kelly Cup championship over the Toledo Walleye in five games.

== League changes ==
The league added two new teams this season: the Tahoe Knight Monsters and the Bloomington Bison.

=== Coaching changes ===
Old Coach	New Coach	Team
Jordan Smotherman	Bob Deraney	Worcester Railers
Alex Loh	Jared Staal	Savannah Ghost Pirates
Brenden Kotyk	Jared Nightingale	South Carolina Stingrays
Chad Costello	B.J. Adams	Allen Americans
Nick Luukko	Brandon Mashinter	Jacksonville Icemen
Expansion team	Phillip Barski	Bloomington Bison
Expansion team	Alex Loh	Tahoe Knight Monsters

=== Affiliation changes ===
ECHL team	New affiliates	Former affiliates
Allen Americans	Utah Hockey Club (NHL); Tucson Roadrunners (AHL)	Ottawa Senators (NHL); Belleville Senators (AHL)
Bloomington Bison	New York Rangers (NHL); Hartford Wolf Pack (AHL)	Expansion team
Cincinnati Cyclones	Toronto Maple Leafs (NHL); Toronto Marlies (AHL)	New York Rangers (NHL); Hartford Wolf Pack (AHL)
Florida Everblades	St. Louis Blues (NHL); Springfield Thunderbirds (AHL)	Florida Panthers (NHL); Charlotte Checkers (AHL)
Savannah Ghost Pirates	Florida Panthers (NHL); Charlotte Checkers (AHL)	Vegas Golden Knights (NHL); Henderson Silver Knights (AHL)
Tahoe Knight Monsters	Vegas Golden Knights (NHL); Henderson Silver Knights (AHL)	Expansion team

== Standings ==
As of April 13, 2025

=== Eastern Conference ===
x – clinched playoff spot, y – clinched regular season division title, z – Brabham Cup (regular season) champion
e – indicates team has been eliminated from playoff contention

North Division	GP	W	L	OTL	SOL	GF	GA	Pts	Pts%
y – Trois-Rivières Lions (MTL)	72	45	19	6	2	251	186	98	0.681
x – Wheeling Nailers (PIT)	72	43	25	3	1	225	194	90	0.625
x – Norfolk Admirals (WPG)	72	40	25	6	1	251	210	87	0.604
x – Reading Royals (PHI)	72	33	28	9	2	203	223	77	0.535
e – Worcester Railers (NYI)	72	34	30	3	5	214	248	76	0.528
e – Maine Mariners (BOS)	72	33	35	4	0	196	237	70	0.486
e – Adirondack Thunder (NJD)	72	26	41	3	2	190	246	57	0.396

South Division	GP	W	L	OTL	SOL	GF	GA	Pts	Pts%
z – South Carolina Stingrays (WAS)	72	52	15	3	2	279	161	109	0.757
x – Florida Everblades (STL)	72	49	15	7	1	241	165	106	0.736
x – Jacksonville Icemen (BUF)	72	42	22	7	1	232	190	92	0.639
x – Orlando Solar Bears (TBL)	72	37	25	10	0	196	200	84	0.583
e – Savannah Ghost Pirates (FLA)	72	31	34	6	1	226	248	69	0.479
e – Atlanta Gladiators (NSH)	72	28	35	7	2	188	248	65	0.451
e – Greenville Swamp Rabbits (LAK)	72	27	37	6	2	191	251	62	0.431

=== Western Conference ===
Central Division	GP	W	L	OTL	SOL	GF	GA	Pts	Pts%
y – Toledo Walleye (DET)	72	44	17	9	2	234	194	99	0.688
x – Fort Wayne Komets (EDM)	72	41	22	7	2	229	193	91	0.632
x – Iowa Heartlanders (MIN)	72	36	25	7	4	201	206	83	0.576
x – Indy Fuel (CHI)	72	32	30	5	5	180	195	74	0.514
e – Kalamazoo Wings (VAN)	72	31	33	6	2	201	229	70	0.486
e – Cincinnati Cyclones (TOR)	72	29	32	11	0	184	207	69	0.479
e – Bloomington Bison (NYR)	72	31	35	4	2	187	210	68	0.472

Mountain Division	GP	W	L	OTL	SOL	GF	GA	Pts	Pts%
y – Kansas City Mavericks (SEA)	72	49	18	4	1	256	178	103	0.715
x – Wichita Thunder (SJS)	72	41	24	6	1	248	214	89	0.618
x – Tahoe Knight Monsters (VGK)	72	41	25	4	2	255	228	88	0.611
x – Tulsa Oilers (ANA)	72	40	24	5	3	244	212	88	0.611
e – Idaho Steelheads (DAL)	72	37	25	9	1	251	231	84	0.583
e – Rapid City Rush (CGY)	72	31	32	6	3	218	265	71	0.493
e – Utah Grizzlies (COL)	72	25	39	6	2	226	292	58	0.403
e – Allen Americans (UTA)	72	16	45	8	3	175	311	43	0.299

== Statistical leaders ==
=== Scoring leaders ===
The following players are sorted by points, then goals.

GP = Games played; G = Goals; A = Assists; Pts = Points; PIM = Penalty minutes

Player	Team	GP	G	A	Pts	PIM
Brandon Hawkins	Toledo Walleye	71	37	52	89	40
Sloan Stanick	Tahoe Knight Monsters	70	29	50	79	24
Ryan Wagner	Rapid City Rush	72	29	50	79	47
Peter Bates	Wichita Thunder	72	28	50	78	10
Brady Fleurent	Norfolk Admirals	72	30	47	77	10
Michal Stínil	Wichita Thunder	63	25	52	77	57
Jack Dugan	Fort Wayne Komets	70	23	53	76	129
Jay Dickman	Wichita Thunder	72	30	43	73	40
Cade Borchardt	Kansas City Mavericks	58	40	31	71	24
Anthony Beauregard	Trois-Rivières Lions	69	25	42	67	32

=== Leading goaltenders ===
GP = Games played; TOI = Time on ice (in minutes); SA = Shots against; GA = Goals against; SO = Shutouts; GAA = Goals against average; SV% = Save percentage; W = Wins; L = Losses; OTL = Overtime/shootout loss

Player	Team	GP	TOI	SA	GA	SO	GAA	SV%	W	L	OTL
Thomas Milic	Norfolk Admirals	18	1091	504	33	3	1.82	.935	11	5	2
Cam Johnson	Florida Everblades	47	2848	1145	91	5	1.92	.921	37	6	4
Garin Bjorklund	South Carolina Stingrays	29	1721	794	58	1	2.02	.927	21	4	3
Taylor Gauthier	Wheeling Nailers	30	1750	836	60	2	2.06	.928	18	10	2
Luke Cavallin	Trois-Rivières Lions	23	1863	927	66	3	2.13	.929	19	10	2
Mark Sinclair	Bloomington Bison	21	1182	595	42	1	2.13	.929	10	6	2

== Postseason ==
The top four teams in each division at the end of the regular season advanced to the 2025 Kelly Cup playoffs and were seeded one through four based on their end-of-season division ranking. Each round was a best-of-7 series with the winner advancing to the next round. The first two rounds were played between teams in the same division, with the first seed facing the fourth seed and the second seed facing the third seed. The winners of each division then played off to determine winners of each conference.

=== Bracket ===
Division Semifinals	Division Finals
N1	Trois-Rivières	4
N4	Reading	0
N1	Trois-Rivières	4
North Division
N3	Norfolk	2
N2	Wheeling	1
N3	Norfolk	4
Eastern Conference
S1	South Carolina	3
S4	Orlando	4
S2	Florida	4
South Division
S4	Orlando	1
S2	Florida	4
S3	Jacksonville	0
C1	Toledo	4
C4	Indy	0
C1	Toledo	4
Central Division
C2	Fort Wayne	2
C2	Fort Wayne	4
C3	Iowa	3
Western Conference
M1	Kansas City	4
M4	Tulsa	2
M1	Kansas City	4
Mountain Division
M3	Tahoe	0
M2	Wichita	0
M3	Tahoe	4

Conference Final
N1	Trois-Rivières	4
S2	Florida	2
C1	Toledo	4
M1	Kansas City	1

Kelly Cup Finals
N1	Trois-Rivières	4
C1	Toledo	1

== See also ==
- List of ECHL seasons
- 2024 in ice hockey
- 2025 in ice hockey
