= 2016 Kelly Cup playoffs =

Tournament details
- Dates: April 13–June 9, 2016
- Teams: 16

Final positions
- Champions: Allen Americans
- Runners-up: Wheeling Nailers

Tournament statistics
- Scoring leader(s): Chad Costello (Allen) (36 points)

Awards
- MVP: Chad Costello (Allen)

The 2016 Kelly Cup Playoffs of the ECHL started April 13, 2016, following the conclusion of the 2015–16 ECHL regular season. The championship was won on June 9 by the Allen Americans.

== Playoff format ==
At the end of the regular season the top team in each division qualified for the 2016 Kelly Cup Playoffs and are seeded either 1, 2, or 3 based on highest point total earned in the season. Then the five non-division winning teams with the highest point totals in each conference qualified for the playoffs and are seeded 4 through 8. The Kelly Cup final pits the Eastern Conference champion against the Western Conference champion. All four rounds are a best-of-seven format.

== Playoff seeds ==
After the regular season, the standard 16 teams qualified for the playoffs. The Missouri Mavericks were the Western Conference regular season champions and the Brabham Cup winners with the best record in the ECHL. The Toledo Walleye earned the top seed in the Eastern Conference.

=== Eastern Conference ===
1. Toledo Walleye – North Division champions, Eastern Conference regular season champions, 99 pts
2. South Carolina Stingrays – South Division champions, 98 pts
3. Manchester Monarchs – East Division champions, 87 pts
4. Florida Everblades – 95 pts
5. Wheeling Nailers – 83 pts
6. Adirondack Thunder – 82 pts
7. Kalamazoo Wings – 82 pts
8. Reading Royals – 82 pts

=== Western Conference ===
1. Missouri Mavericks – Central Division champions, Western Conference regular season champions, Brabham Cup winners, 109 pts
2. Fort Wayne Komets – Midwest Division champions, 89 pts
3. Colorado Eagles – West Division champions, 86 pts
4. Allen Americans – 89 pts
5. Idaho Steelheads – 86 pts
6. Utah Grizzlies – 84 pts
7. Cincinnati Cyclones – 81 pts
8. Quad City Mallards – 80 pts

== Playoff Brackets ==
Conference quarterfinals | Conference semifinals
E1 | Toledo Walleye | 3
E8 | Reading Royals | 4
E8 | Reading | 3
E5 | Wheeling | 4
E4 | Florida Everblades | 2
E5 | Wheeling Nailers | 4
Eastern Conference
E2 | South Carolina Stingrays | 4
E7 | Kalamazoo Wings | 1
E2 | South Carolina | 4
E6 | Adirondack | 3
E3 | Manchester Monarchs | 1
E6 | Adirondack Thunder | 4
W1 | Missouri Mavericks | 4
W8 | Quad City Mallards | 0
W1 | Missouri | 2
W4 | Allen | 4
W4 | Allen Americans | 4
W5 | Idaho Steelheads | 3
Western Conference
W2 | Fort Wayne Komets | 4
W7 | Cincinnati Cyclones | 3
W2 | Fort Wayne | 4
W6 | Utah | 0
W3 | Colorado Eagles | 2
W6 | Utah Grizzlies | 4

Conference finals
E5 | Wheeling | 4
E2 | South Carolina | 3
W4 | Allen | 4
W2 | Fort Wayne | 1

Kelly Cup finals
E5 | Wheeling | 2
W4 | Allen | 4

== Conference Quarterfinals ==
Home team is listed first.

=== Eastern Conference ===
==== (1) Toledo Walleye vs. (8) Reading Royals ====
| April 15 | Toledo Walleye | 3–4 | Reading Royals | Huntington Center | Recap |
| 15:12 – Evan Rankin (1) | | First period | Kevin Sundher (1) – pp – 9:09; Austin Farley (1) – 12:43; Brandon Alderson (1) – pp – 19:57 |
| 12:35 – pp – Tylor Spink (1) | | Second period | No scoring |
| 3:49 – Kyle Bonis (1) | | Third period | Cam Reid (1) – 14:55 |
| Jeff Lerg 30 saves / 34 shots | | Goalie stats | Martin Ouellette 21 saves / 24 shots |

| April 16 | Toledo Walleye | 4–3 | Reading Royals | Huntington Center | Recap |
| 6:48 – pp – Kyle Bonis (2); 9:22 – sh – A. J. Jenks (1); 11:41 – Evan Rankin (2); 15:02 – Joël Chouinard (1) | | First period | No scoring |
| No scoring | | Second period | No scoring |
| No scoring | | Third period | Justin Crandall (1) – 0:41; Mike Marcou (1) – 9:30; Brandon Alderson (2) – 17:47 |
| Jake Paterson 23 saves / 26 shots | | Goalie stats | Martin Ouellette 3 saves / 6 shots Adam Morrison 14 saves / 15 shots |

| April 19 | Reading Royals | 4–2 | Toledo Walleye | Santander Arena | Recap |
| 18:31 – Maxim Lamarche (1) | | First period | No scoring |
| 12:41 – Yannick Tifu (1) | | Second period | Tylor Spink (2) – 11:24 |
| 7:53 – Ian Watters (1); 19:30 – en – Joe Rehkamp (1) | | Third period | Kyle Bonis (3) – 17:56 |
| Martin Ouellette 33 saves / 35 shots | | Goalie stats | Jeff Lerg 33 saves / 36 shots |

| April 20 | Reading Royals | 1–3 | Toledo Walleye | Santander Arena | Recap |
| No scoring | | First period | A. J. Jenks (2) – 2:39 |
| 17:13 – Brandon Alderson (3) | | Second period | A. J. Jenks (3) – pp – 0:39 |
| No scoring | | Third period | Shane Berschbach (1) – en – 19:07 |
| Adam Morrison 22 saves / 24 shots | | Goalie stats | Jake Paterson 25 saves / 26 shots |

| April 22 | Toledo Walleye | 3–5 | Reading Royals | Huntington Center | Recap |
| No scoring | | First period | Cam Reid (2) – 6:49; Mike Marcou (2) – pp – 9:43 |
| 4:02 – pp – Shane Berschbach (2); 9:57 – pp – Kyle Bonis (4); 18:51 – Kyle Bonis (5) | | Second period | Brandon Alderson (4) – 10:25; Brandon Alderson (5) – 12:17 |
| No scoring | | Third period | Brandon Alderson (6) – pp – 6:30 |
| Jake Paterson 7 saves / 11 shots Jeff Lerg 8 saves / 9 shots | | Goalie stats | Martin Ouellette 34 saves / 37 shots |

| April 24 | Reading Royals | 1–3 | Toledo Walleye | Santander Arena | Recap |
| No scoring | | First period | Dominic Zombo (1) – 9:19 |
| 19:42 – pp – Cam Reid (3) | | Second period | A. J. Jenks (4) – 16:14 |
| No scoring | | Third period | A. J. Jenks (5) – en – 18:38 |
| Martin Ouellette 12 saves / 14 shots | | Goalie stats | Jeff Lerg 33 saves / 34 shots |

| April 26 | Toledo Walleye | 1–4 | Reading Royals | Huntington Center | Recap |
| No scoring | | First period | Kevin Goumas (1) – 8:06 |
| No scoring | | Second period | Nikita Kashirsky (1) – 1:15; Kevin Goumas (2) – 6:28 |
| 1:27 – Matt Caito (1) | | Third period | Kevin Goumas (3) – 11:03 |
| Jeff Lerg 16 saves / 20 shots | | Goalie stats | Martin Ouellette 37 saves / 38 shots |

| Reading wins series 4–3 |

==== (2) South Carolina Stingrays vs. (7) Kalamazoo Wings ====
| April 15 | Kalamazoo Wings | 1–4 | South Carolina Stingrays | Wings Event Center | Recap |
| Ludwig Blomstrand (1) – pp – 9:25 | | First period | 10:56 – Kelly Zajac (1) |
| No scoring | | Second period | 10:16 – Caleb Herbert (1); 11:04 – Derek DeBlois (1) |
| No scoring | | Third period | 5:05 – Austin Fyten (1) |
| Joel Martin 36 saves / 40 shots | | Goalie stats | Mark Dekanich 22 saves / 23 shots |

| April 16 | Kalamazoo Wings | 2–5 | South Carolina Stingrays | Wings Event Center | Recap |
| No scoring | | First period | 12:53 – Joe Devin (1) |
| Tanner Sorenson (1) – 11:27; Sacha Guimond (1) – 12:33 | | Second period | 3:45 – Caleb Herbert (2); 6:30 – Wade Epp (1) |
| No scoring | | Third period | 3:03 – Brett Cameron (1); 6:35 – Brett Cameron (2) |
| Joel Martin 29 saves / 34 shots | | Goalie stats | Mark Dekanich 20 saves / 22 shots |

| April 18 | Kalamazoo Wings | 5–3 | South Carolina Stingrays | Wings Event Center | Recap |
| No scoring | | First period | Nick Jones (1) – pp – 6:47 |
| 1:01 – pp – Justin Kovacs (1); 6:03 – Zack Phillips (1); 14:40 – pp – Alex Mallet (1) | | Second period | Brett Cameron (3) – 11:06 |
| 11:31 – Justin Kovacs (2); 19:34 – en – Zack Phillips (2) | | Third period | Joe Devin (2) – 16:59 |
| Joel Martin 38 saves / 41 shots | | Goalie stats | Mark Dekanich 17 saves / 21 shots |

| April 21 | South Carolina Stingrays | 3–2 | Kalamazoo Wings | North Charleston Coliseum | Recap |
| Caleb Herbert (3) – 10:35 | | First period | 19:08 – Ludwig Blomstrand (2) |
| Joe Devin (3) – 3:48 | | Second period | No scoring |
| Joe Devin (4) – pp – 19:20 | | Third period | 0:45 – sh – Justin Taylor (1) |
| Vítek Vaněček 27 saves / 29 shots | | Goalie stats | Joel Martin 43 saves / 46 shots |

| April 23 | South Carolina Stingrays | 5–1 | Kalamazoo Wings | North Charleston Coliseum | Recap |
| No scoring | | First period | No scoring |
| 10:13 – Nick Jones (2); 10:54 – pp – Joe Devin (5); 12:28 – Stephan Vigier (1) | | Second period | Brett Ponich (1) – 15:54 |
| 15:07 – Austin Fyten (2); 18:30 – en – Joey Leach (1) | | Third period | No scoring |
| Vítek Vaněček 23 saves / 24 shots | | Goalie stats | Joel Martin 23 saves / 27 shots |

| South Carolina wins series 4–1 |

==== (3) Manchester Monarchs vs. (6) Adirondack Thunder ====
| April 13 | Manchester Monarchs | 2–3 | Adirondack Thunder | Verizon Wireless Arena | Recap |
| No scoring | | First period | Michael Kirkpatrick (1) – 0:43 |
| No scoring | | Second period | Greg Wolfe (1) – pp – 17:43 |
| 4:52 – Mark Anthoine (1); 5:23 – Zac Larraza (1) | | Third period | Greg Wolfe (2) – 18:27 |
| Doug Carr 22 saves / 25 shots | | Goalie stats | Ken Appleby 25 saves / 27 shots |

| April 15 | Manchester Monarchs | 3–4 | OT | Adirondack Thunder | Verizon Wireless Arena | Recap |
| 1:02 – Maxim Kitsyn (1) | | First period | | Michael Kirkpatrick (2) – 12:47; Mitchell Heard (1) – 15:23 |
| No scoring | | Second period | | No scoring |
| 8:52 – Zac Larraza (2); 10:05 – Troy Power (1) | | Third period | | Greg Wolfe (3) – 14:11 |
| No scoring | | First overtime period | | Pete MacArthur (1) – 9:40 |
| Doug Carr 27 saves / 31 shots | | Goalie stats | | Ken Appleby 23 saves / 26 shots |

| April 16 | Adirondack Thunder | 4–2 | Manchester Monarchs | Glens Falls Civic Center | Recap |
| 0:40 – Mitchell Heard (2); 13:59 – Mitchell Heard (3) | | First period | Maxim Kitsyn (2) 9:51 |
| 12:44 – pp – Ryan Lomberg (1) | | Second period | No scoring |
| 19:45 – en – Greg Wolfe (4) | | Third period | Matt Fornataro (1) – pp – 10:31 |
| Ken Appleby 30 saves / 32 shots | | Goalie stats | Colin Stevens 19 saves / 22 shots |

| April 18 | Adirondack Thunder | 1–2 | Manchester Monarchs | Glens Falls Civic Center | Recap |
| No scoring | | First period | No scoring |
| 19:43 – pp – Ryan Lomberg (2) | | Second period | Matt Leitner (1) – pp – 16:36 |
| No scoring | | Third period | Darik Angeli (1) – 11:00 |
| Ken Appleby 34 saves / 36 shots | | Goalie stats | Doug Carr 29 saves / 30 shots |

| April 20 | Manchester Monarchs | 0–3 | Adirondack Thunder | Verizon Wireless Arena | Recap |
| No scoring | | First period | Peter MacArthur (2) – 6:30; Ryan Constant (1) – pp – 13:59 |
| No scoring | | Second period | Dana Fraser (1) – 11:32 |
| No scoring | | Third period | No scoring |
| Doug Carr 21 saves / 24 shots | | Goalie stats | Ken Appleby 33 saves / 33 shots |

| Adirondack wins series 4–1 |

==== (4) Florida Everblades vs. (5) Wheeling Nailers ====
| April 15 | Florida Everblades | 3–6 | Wheeling Nailers | Germain Arena | Recap |
| No scoring | | First period | John McCarron (1) – 9:23; Andrew Ammon (1) – 10:46; Cody Wydo (1) – 16:46; Mathew Maione (1) – pp – 19:21 |
| 4:44 – Matt Marquardt (1); 12:17 – Ryan Martindale (1) | | Second period | Mathew Maione (2) – 18:47 |
| 14:36 – Gabriel Desjardins (1) | | Third period | John McCarron (2) – 5:26 |
| Anthony Peters 6 saves / 10 shots Rasmus Tirronen 21 saves / 23 shots | | Goalie stats | Franky Palazzese 25 saves / 28 shots |

| April 16 | Florida Everblades | 4–1 | Wheeling Nailers | Germain Arena | Recap |
| No scoring | | First period | No scoring |
| 3:58 – pp – Ryan Martindale (2); 6:49 – Matt Willows (1); 10:55 – Jon DiSalvatore (1) | | Second period | Anton Zlobin (1) – pp – 15:20 |
| 18:12 – pp – Matt Marquardt (2) | | Third period | No scoring |
| Anthony Peters 20 saves / 21 shots | | Goalie stats | Franky Palazzese 35 saves / 39 shots |

| April 20 | Wheeling Nailers | 3–6 | Florida Everblades | WesBanco Arena | Recap |
| 12:37 – Jordan Kwas (1) | | First period | Daniel New (1) – pp –14:27 |
| No scoring | | Second period | Brenden O'Donnell (1) – pp – Kevin Lynch (1) – pp – 6:15; Kevin Lynch (2) – sh – 14:13 |
| Riley Brace (1) – 3:36; Cody Wydo (2) – 14:55 | | Third period | Brenden O'Donnell (2) – 11:20; Gabriel Desjardins (2) – en – 19:20 |
| Franky Palazzese 8 saves / 11 shots Brian Foster 12 saves / 14 shots | | Goalie stats | Anthony Peters 36 saves / 39 shots |

| April 22 | Wheeling Nailers | 5–4 | Florida Everblades | WesBanco Arena | Recap |
| No scoring | | First period | Brenden O'Donnell (3) – 7:45 |
| 12:04 – pp – John McCarron (3); 14:02 – Ty Loney (1) | | Second period | Ryan Martindale (3) – 2:39; Matt Willows (2) – 2:52; Daniel New (2) – 15:04 |
| 0:29 – sh – John McCarron (4); 1:48 – Cody Wydo (3); 7:38 – Riley Brace (2) | | Third period | No scoring |
| Brian Foster 25 saves / 29 shots | | Goalie stats | Anthony Peters 26 shots / 31 saves |

| April 23 | Wheeling Nailers | 4–3 | Florida Everblades | WesBanco Arena | Recap |
| Ty Loney (2) – 4:47; Mathew Maione (3) – 7:56; Riley Brace (3) – pp – 12:52 | | First period | No scoring |
| Mathew Maione (4) – 2:01 | | Second period | 12:00 – pp – Matt Marquardt (3) |
| No scoring | | Third period | 6:53 – sh – Jon DiSalvatore (2); 13:03 – Ethan Werek (1) |
| Brian Foster 26 saves / 29 shots | | Goalie stats | Anthony Peters 11 saves / 15 shots Rasmus Tirronen 14 saves / 14 shots |

| April 25 | Florida Everblades | 1–2 | Wheeling Nailers | Germain Arena | Recap |
| Mike Cornell (1) – 17:34 | | First period | No scoring |
| No scoring | | Second period | 16:22 – Ty Loney (3) |
| No scoring | | Third period | 10:40 – Shane Bakker (1) |
| Rasmus Tirronen 20 saves / 22 shots | | Goalie stats | Brian Foster 43 saves / 44 shots |

| Wheeling wins series 4–2 |

=== Western Conference ===
==== (1) Missouri Mavericks vs. (8) Quad City Mallards ====
| April 16 | Missouri Mavericks | 6–3 | Quad City Mallards | Silverstein Eye Centers Arena | Recap |
| 9:24 – Andrew Courtney (1); 14:16 – pp – Tyler Barnes (1) | | First period | Matt Carey (1) – 1:49; Matt Carey (2) – pp – 16:47 |
| 3:39 – pp – Andrew Courtney (2); 16:42 – Zach Tolkinen (1) | | Second period | Jordan Knackstedt (1) – pp – 0:15 |
| 18:25 – sh – en – Chris Owens (1); 19:51 – en – Josh Holmstrom (1) | | Third period | No scoring |
| Josh Robinson 38 saves / 41 shots | | Goalie stats | Brody Hoffman 23 saves / 27 shots |

| April 17 | Missouri Mavericks | 2–1 | Quad City Mallards | Silverstein Eye Centers Arena | Recap |
| 10:52 – Reed Seckel (1) | | First period | No scoring |
| 9:45 – Josh Holmstrom (2) | | Second period | No scoring |
| No scoring | | Third period | Sam Warning (1) – 5:56 |
| Parker Milner 28 saves / 29 shots | | Goalie stats | Brody Hoffman 21 saves / 23 shots |

| April 20 | Quad City Mallards | 2–4 | Missouri Mavericks | iWireless Center | Recap |
| 4:05 – sh – Matt Neal (1) | | First period | Bryce Aneloski (1) – 7:15 |
| 5:38 – Olivier Archambault (1) | | Second period | No scoring |
| No scoring | | Third period | Tyler Barnes (2) – 0:47; David de Kastrozza (1) – sh – 15:33; Reed Seckel (2) – ps – 17:11 |
| Brody Hoffman 32 saves / 36 shots | | Goalie stats | Josh Robinson 22 saves / 24 shots |

| April 22 | Quad City Mallards | 1–4 | Missouri Mavericks | iWireless Center | Recap |
| No scoring | | First period | Bryce Aneloski (2) – pp – 7:35 |
| No scoring | | Second period | Chris Owens (2) – 9:14; Rocco Carzo – pp – 17:46 |
| 7:54 – Sam Warning (2) | | Third period | Carter Verhaeghe (1) – 11:54 |
| P. J. Musico 26 saves / 30 shots | | Goalie stats | Josh Robinson 24 saves / 25 shots |

| Missouri wins series 4–0 |

==== (2) Fort Wayne Komets vs. (7) Cincinnati Cyclones ====
| April 15 | Fort Wayne Komets | 2–3 | Cincinnati Cyclones | Allen County War Memorial Coliseum | Recap |
| No scoring | | First period | Jack Downing (1) – pp – 19:03 |
| 10:03 – Troy Bourke (1); 15:36 – pp – Trevor Cheek (1) | | Second period | Tommy Mele (1) – sh – 13:54; Tommy Mele (2) – 19:45 |
| No scoring | | Third period | No scoring |
| Pat Nagle 20 saves / 23 shots | | Goalie stats | Brad Thiessen 33 saves / 35 shots |

| April 16 | Fort Wayne Komets | 2–3 | Cincinnati Cyclones | Allen County War Memorial Coliseum | Recap |
| 5:46 – Garrett Thompson (1) | | First period | No scoring |
| No scoring | | Second period | Andrew Yogan (1) – sh – 8:45; Zach Budish (1) – 17:04 |
| Kyle Thomas (1) – 14:10 | | Third period | Christiaan Minella (1) – 19:27 |
| Pat Nagle 17 saves / 20 shots | | Goalie stats | Brad Thiessen 31 saves / 33 shots |

| April 20 | Cincinnati Cyclones | 0–8 | Fort Wayne Komets | U.S. Bank Arena | Recap |
| No scoring | | First period | Alex Belzile (1) – 1:12; Troy Bourke (2) – 5:31; Kyle Thomas (2) – pp – 16:55 |
| No scoring | | Second period | Alex Belzile (2) – sh – 5:14; Shawn Szydlowski (1) – pp – 9:57; Shawn Szydlowski (2) – 13:02; Garrett Thompson (2) – 16:01 |
| No scoring | | Third period | Paul Crowder (1) – 5:35 |
| Brad Thiessen 9 saves / 13 shots Brandon Whitney 12 saves / 16 shots | | Goalie stats | Pat Nagle 21 saves / 21 shots |

| April 22 | Cincinnati Cyclones | 2–3 | 2OT | Fort Wayne Komets | U.S. Bank Arena | Recap |
| 3:45 – Jack Downing (2) | | First period | | No scoring |
| 18:02 – Christiaan Minella (2) | | Second period | | Troy Bourke (3) – pp – 19:52 |
| No scoring | | Third period | | Troy Bourke (4) – pp – 7:03 |
| No scoring | | Second overtime period | | Alex Belzile (3) – 15:20 |
| Brad Thiessen 53 saves / 56 shots | | Goalie stats | | Pat Nagle 29 saves / 31 shots |

| April 23 | Cincinnati Cyclones | 5–4 | 2OT | Fort Wayne Komets | U.S. Bank Arena | Recap |
| Branden Gracel (1) – 3:42; Steve Weinstein (1) – 12:53 | | First period | | 0:39 – Garrett Thompson (3) |
| Andrew Blazek (1) – 8:08 | | Second period | | 0:59 – Shawn Szydlowski (3); 10:14 – pp – Brett Perlini (1) |
| Andrew Blazek (2) – 7:40 | | Third period | | 17:18 – pp – Garrett Thompson (4) |
| Jonathan Diaby (1) – 9:26 | | Second overtime period | | No scoring |
| Brad Thiessen 41 saves / 45 shots | | Goalie stats | | Pat Nagle 35 saves / 40 shots |

| April 25 | Fort Wayne Komets | 2–1 | OT | Cincinnati Cyclones | Allen County War Memorial Coliseum | Recap |
| No scoring | | First period | | No scoring |
| Alex Belzile (4) – pp – 1:02 | | Second period | | No scoring |
| No scoring | | Third period | | 9:55 – Andrew Yogan (2) |
| Garrett Thompson (5) – pp – 5:30 | | First overtime period | | No scoring |
| Pat Nagle 23 saves / 24 shots | | Goalie stats | | Brad Thiessen 39 saves / 41 shots |

| April 27 | Fort Wayne Komets | 2–0 | Cincinnati Cyclones | Allen County War Memorial Coliseum | Recap |
| 4:26 – Jamie Schaafsma (1); 13:38 – Jamie Schaafsma (2) | | First period | No scoring |
| No scoring | | Second period | No scoring |
| No scoring | | Third period | No scoring |
| Pat Nagle 33 saves / 33 shots | | Goalie stats | Brad Thiessen 33 saves / 35 shots |

| Fort Wayne wins series 4–3 |

==== (3) Colorado Eagles vs. (6) Utah Grizzlies ====
| April 14 | Colorado Eagles | 2–3 | Utah Grizzlies | Budweiser Events Center | Recap |
| 3:59 – Kyle Kraemer (1) | | First period | Barry Almeida (1) – 11:09 |
| 14:59 – pp – Kyle Kraemer (2) | | Second period | Bryan Moore (1) – 5:52; Matt Berry (1) – pp – 7:58 |
| No scoring | | Third period | No scoring |
| Clarke Saunders 19 saves / 22 shots | | Goalie stats | Mark Owuya 22 saves / 24 shots |

| April 17 | Colorado Eagles | 5–4 | 3OT | Utah Grizzlies | Budweiser Events Center | Recap |
| 11:33 – pp – Jake Marto (1); 12:03 – Collin Bowman (1); 13:03 – Everett Sheen (1) | | First period | | T. J. Syner (1) – 7:53 |
| No scoring | | Second period | | Connor Hardowa (1) – 4:58 |
| 3:54 – Darryl Bootland (1) | | Third period | | Ryan Hayes (1) – 0:40; Charles Sarault (1) – 7:18 |
| 2:31 – Darryl Bootland (2) | | Third overtime period | | No scoring |
| Kris Lazaruk 40 saves / 44 shots | | Goalie stats | | Mark Owuya 2 saves / 5 shots Ryan Faragher 33 saves / 35 shots |

| April 21 | Utah Grizzlies | 3–2 | Colorado Eagles | Maverik Center | Recap |
| 16:20 – Eric Knodel (1) | | First period | No scoring |
| 2:40 – sh – Marc Cantin (1) | | Second period | Kyle Ostrow (1) – pp – 15:18 |
| 1:05 – Erik Higby (1) | | Third period | Kyle Kraemer (3) – 5:40 |
| Ryan Faragher 17 saves / 19 shots | | Goalie stats | Clarke Saunders 28 saves / 31 shots |

| April 23 | Utah Grizzlies | 7–2 | Colorado Eagles | Maverik Center | Recap |
| 2:55 – pp – Phil Pietroniro (1) | | First period | Everett Sheen (2) – 17:19 |
| 2:51 – Charles Sarault (2); 17:54 – Ryan Hayes (2) | | Second period | Trent Daavettila (1) – pp – 13:43 |
| 1:39 – C. J. Eick (1); 3:59 – pp – Charles Sarault (3); 11:47 – Alex Krushelnyski (1); 15:20 – pp – Charles Sarault (4) | | Third period | No scoring |
| Ryan Faragher 33 saves / 35 shots | | Goalie stats | Kris Lazaruk 24 saves / 31 shots |

| April 24 | Utah Grizzlies | 2–5 | Colorado Eagles | Maverik Center | Recap |
| No scoring | | First period | No scoring |
| Jon Puskar (1) – pp – 4:07; Matt Berry (2) – 7:25 | | Second period | 17:26 – Jesse Mychan (1); 18:39 – pp – Collin Bowman (2); 19:26 – Jesse Mychan (2) |
| No scoring | | Third period | 6:36 – Trent Daavettila (2); 19:53 – en – Trent Daavettila (3) |
| Ryan Faragher 33 saves / 37 shots | | Goalie stats | Clarke Saunders 32 saves / 34 shots |

| April 26 | Colorado Eagles | 2–7 | Utah Grizzlies | Budweiser Events Center | Recap |
| Trent Daavettila (4) – 5:37 | | First period | 3:54 – Bryan Moore (2); 7:56 – Barry Almeida (2); 19:15 – Marc Cantin (2) |
| Everett Sheen (3) – pp – 7:05 | | Second period | 11:52 – Alex Krushelnyski (2) |
| No scoring | | Third period | 1:05 – Charles Sarault (5); 13:45 – en – Matt Berry (3); 17:21 – en – Charles Sarault (6) |
| Clarke Saunders 11 saves / 16 shots | | Goalie stats | Ryan Faragher 27 saves / 29 shots |

| Utah wins series 4–2 |

==== (4) Allen Americans vs. (5) Idaho Steelheads ====
| April 14 | Allen Americans | 1–3 | Idaho Steelheads | Allen Event Center | Recap |
| No scoring | | First period | André Bouvet-Morrissette (1) – 13:07 |
| 17:25 – Gary Steffes (1) | | Second period | Shawn Boutin (1) – 3:11 |
| No scoring | | Third period | Joe Basaraba (1) – pp – 3:49 |
| Jake Hildebrand 21 saves / 24 saves | | Goalie stats | Philippe Desrosiers 36 saves / 37 shots |

| April 16 | Allen Americans | 3–1 | Idaho Steelheads | Allen Event Center | Recap |
| 17:54 – Gary Steffes (2) | | First period | No scoring |
| 3:31 – pp – Casey Pierro-Zabotel (1) | | Second period | Rob Linsmayer (1) – 15:33 |
| 7:32 – Casey Pierro-Zabotel (2) | | Third period | No scoring |
| Riley Gill 21 saves / 22 shots | | Goalie stats | Philippe Desrosiers 31 saves / 34 shots |

| April 20 | Idaho Steelheads | 1–3 | Allen Americans | CenturyLink Arena | Recap |
| No scoring | | First period | Greger Hanson (1) – 4:44; David Makowski (1) – pp – 16:59 |
| 4:28 – pp – Tommy Fallen (1) | | Second period | Matthew Register (1) – pp – 11:44 |
| No scoring | | Third period | No scoring |
| Philippe Desrosiers 27 saves / 30 shots | | Goalie stats | Riley Gill 37 saves / 38 saves |

| April 22 | Idaho Steelheads | 3–1 | Allen Americans | CenturyLink Arena | Recap |
| No scoring | | First period | No scoring |
| 0:50 – sh – Kyle Jean (1) | | Second period | Tristan King (1) – 16:53 |
| 1:11 – Joe Basaraba (2); 18:35 – en – Kyle Jean (2) | | Third period | No scoring |
| Philippe Desrosiers 29 saves / 30 shots | | Goalie stats | Riley Gill 26 saves / 28 shots |

| April 23 | Idaho Steelheads | 7–1 | Allen Americans | CenturyLink Arena | Recap |
| Kruise Reddick (1) – 2:31; Taylor Peters (1) –4:15; Radoslav Illo (1) –6:36; André Bouvet-Morrissette (2) – sh – 18:50 | | First period | No scoring |
| Carson McMillan (1) – pp – 14:22 | | Second period | 18:15 – pp – Greger Hanson (2) |
| André Bouvet-Morrissette (3) – pp – 7:35 ' Joe Basaraba (3) – pp – 9:46 | | Third period | No scoring |
| Philippe Desrosiers 20 saves / 21 shots | | Goalie stats | Riley Gill 1 save / 3 shots Jake Hildebrand 21 saves / 26 saves |

| April 26 | Allen Americans | 4–2 | Idaho Steelheads | Allen Event Center | Recap |
| Tristan King (2) – 14:12 | | First period | 12:57 – Tommy Fallen (2) |
| Eric Roy (1) – pp – 0:33; Matthew Register (2) – 2:12; Greger Hanson (3) – pp – 9:24 | | Second period | No scoring |
| No scoring | | Third period | 6:08 – Rob Linsmayer (2) |
| Riley Gill 30 saves / 32 shots | | Goalie stats | Philippe Desrosiers 10 saves / 14 shots Branden Komm 13 saves / 13 shots |

| April 27 | Allen Americans | 3–2 | OT | Idaho Steelheads | Allen Event Center | Recap |
| No scoring | | First period | | No scoring |
| 6:14 – Chad Costello (1) | | Second period | | Kruise Reddick (2) – 5:45; Andrew Carroll (1) – 8:27 |
| 7:06 – pp – David Makowski (2) | | Third period | | No scoring |
| 3:28 – Tristan King (3) | | First overtime period | | No scoring |
| Riley Gill 24 saves / 26 shots | | Goalie stats | | Philippe Desrosiers 39 saves / 42 shots |

| Allen wins series 4–3 |

== Conference Semifinals ==
Home team is listed first.

=== Eastern Conference ===
==== (2) South Carolina Stingrays vs. (6) Adirondack Thunder ====
| April 29 | South Carolina Stingrays | 4–5 | Adirondack Thunder | North Charleston Coliseum | Recap |
| 13:37 – Joey Leach (2) | | First period | Peter MacArthur (3) – 0:23; Ben Johnson (1) – sh – 3:48; Mathieu Brodeur (1) – pp – 16:13 |
| 8:39 – Caleb Herbert (4) | | Second period | Greg Wolfe (5) – 10:31; Dana Fraser (2) – 18:05 |
| 6:01 – pp – Derek DeBlois (2); 14:12 – Derek DeBlois (3) | | Third period | No scoring |
| Vítek Vaněček 5 saves / 8 shots Mark Dekanich 6 saves / 8 shots | | Goalie stats | Ken Appleby 23 saves / 27 shots |

| April 30 | South Carolina Stingrays | 1–0 | Adirondack Thunder | North Charleston Coliseum | Recap |
| No scoring | | First period | No scoring |
| 12:24 – Austin Fyten (3) | | Second period | No scoring |
| No scoring | | Third period | No scoring |
| Mark Dekanich 21 saves / 21 shots | | Goalie stats | Ken Appleby 29 saves / 30 shots |

| May 3 | Adirondack Thunder | 3–1 | South Carolina Stingrays | Glens Falls Civic Center | Recap |
| 13:30 – pp – Mitchell Heard (4) | | First period | Caleb Herbert (5) – 3:50 |
| 14:09 – Ryan Lomberg (3) | | Second period | No scoring |
| 19:45 – en – Gunnar Hughes (1) | | Third period | No scoring |
| Ken Appleby 28 saves / 29 shots | | Goalie stats | Mark Dekanich 24 saves / 26 shots |

| May 5 | Adirondack Thunder | 0–6 | South Carolina Stingrays | Glens Falls Civic Center | Recap |
| No scoring | | First period | Caleb Herbert (6) – 1:00; Kelly Zajac (2) – pp – 14:41 |
| No scoring | | Second period | Joe Devin (6) – sh – 1:21; Colton Saucerman (1) – pp – 12:35; Stephan Vigier (2) – pp – 17:30 |
| No scoring | | Third period | Joe Devin (7) – 2:18 |
| Ken Appleby 12 saves / 17 shots Drew Fielding 4 saves / 5 shots | | Goalie stats | Mark Dekanich 30 saves / 30 shots |

| May 7 | Adirondack Thunder | 3–2 | OT | South Carolina Stingrays | Glens Falls Civic Center | Recap |
| Ben Johnson (2) – 11:14; Greg Wolfe (6) – 18:55 | | First period | | No scoring |
| No scoring | | Second period | | 11:01 – Caleb Herbert (7) |
| No scoring | | Third period | | 13:52 – Spencer Humphries (1) |
| Gunnar Hughes (2) – 11:21 | | First overtime period | | No scoring |
| Ken Appleby 28 saves / 30 shots | | Goalie stats | | Mark Dekanich 26 saves / 29 shots |

| May 10 | South Carolina Stingrays | 4–1 | Adirondack Thunder | North Charleston Coliseum | Recap |
| Joe Devin (8) – 6:37; Stephan Vigier (3) – pp – 12:45 | | First period | 19:48 – pp – Mathieu Brodeur (2) |
| Austin Fyten (4) – pp – 9:25; Stephan Vigier (4) – pp – 14:57 | | Second period | No scoring |
| No scoring | | Third period | No scoring |
| Mark Dekanich 18 saves / 19 shots | | Goalie stats | Ken Appleby 26 saves / 30 shots |

| May 11 | South Carolina Stingrays | 3–2 | 2OT | Adirondack Thunder | North Charleston Coliseum | Recap |
| 5:19 – David Pacan (1) | | First period | | Ben Johnson (3) – 4:43 |
| No scoring | | Second period | | Mitchell Heard (5) – pp – 19:14 |
| 9:51 – Brett Cameron (4) | | Third period | | No scoring |
| 15:34 – Joe Devin (9) | | Second overtime period | | No scoring |
| Mark Dekanich 18 saves / 20 shots Vítek Vaněček 8 saves / 8 shots | | Goalie stats | | Ken Appleby 43 saves / 46 shots |

| South Carolina wins series 4–3 |

==== (5) Wheeling Nailers vs. (8) Reading Royals ====
| April 29 | Wheeling Nailers | 4–1 | Reading Royals | WesBanco Arena | Recap |
| 16:34 – pp – Cody Wydo (4) | | First period | No scoring |
| 2:18 – Mathew Maione (5) | | Second period | Jesper Pettersson (1) – pp – 9:16 |
| 5:58 – Jordan Kwas (2); 11:49 – Cody Wydo (5) | | Third period | No scoring |
| Brian Foster 18 saves / 19 shots | | Goalie stats | Martin Ouellette 30 saves / 34 shots |

| May 2 | Wheeling Nailers | 2–4 | Reading Royals | WesBanco Arena | Recap |
| No scoring | | First period | Kevin Goumas (4) – 14:06 |
| 3:54 – Matt Tabrum (1); 10:57 – pp – Clark Seymour (1) | | Second period | No scoring |
| No scoring | | Third period | Justin Crandall (2) – pp – 8:12; Brandon Alderson (7) – 10:09; Ian Watters (2) – 13:40 |
| Brian Foster 34 saves / 38 shots | | Goalie stats | Adam Morrison 29 saves / 31 shots |

| May 4 | Reading Royals | 4–1 | Wheeling Nailers | Santander Arena | Recap |
| 18:48 – Mike Marcou (3) | | First period | No scoring |
| 6:48 – Cam Reid (4); 12:35 – Michael Pelech (1) | | Second period | Shane Bakker (2) – 0:56 |
| 19:48 – Maxim Lamarche (2) | | Third period | No scoring |
| Adam Morrison 37 saves / 38 shots | | Goalie stats | Brian Foster 27 saves / 31 shots |

| May 5 | Reading Royals | 1–2 | 3OT | Wheeling Nailers | Santander Arena | Recap |
| No scoring | | First period | | No scoring |
| No scoring | | Second period | | Ty Loney (4) – pp – 4:20 |
| 13:02 – Brandon Alderson (8) | | Third period | | No scoring |
| No scoring | | Third overtime period | | Cody Wydo (6) – 4:22 |
| Martin Ouellete 50 saves / 52 shots | | Goalie stats | | Franky Palazzese 42 saves / 43 saves |

| May 7 | Reading Royals | 3–1 | Wheeling Nailers | Santander Arena | Recap |
| Cam Reid (5) – 12:18 | | First period | No scoring |
| Justin Crandall (3) – 12:47 | | Second period | 5:26 – pp – Shane Bakker (3) |
| Kevin Goumas (5) – en – 18:51 | | Third period | No scoring |
| Adam Morrison 29 saves / 30 shots | | Goalie stats | Franky Palazzese 18 saves / 20 shots |

| May 9 | Wheeling Nailers | 8–3 | Reading Royals | WesBanco Arena | Recap |
| Ty Loney (4) – 5:53; Brett Stern (1) – pp – 16:55 | | First period | 2:38 – Scott Tanski (1) |
| No scoring | | Second period | 3:49 – pp – Maxim Lamarche (3) |
| John McCarron (5) – 0:33; Jarrett Burton (1) – pp – 8:13; Clark Seymour (3) – 10:50; Dan O'Donoghue (1) 14:45; Derek Army (1) – pp – en – 17:08; Dan O'Donoghue (2) – 17:40 | | Third period | 18:13 – Nikita Kashirsky (2) |
| Brian Foster 32 saves / 35 shots | | Goalie stats | Adam Morrison 39 saves / 46 shots |

| May 11 | Wheeling Nailers | 4–3 | OT | Reading Royals | WesBanco Arena | Recap |
| No scoring | | First period | | Adam Comrie (1) – 18:16 |
| 11:26 – Jordan Kwas (3); 17:37 – Shane Bakker (4) | | Second period | | Austin Farley (2) – 6:49 |
| 9:13 – pp – Derek Army (2) | | Third period | | Yannick Tifu (2) – 18:10 |
| 19:22 – Riley Brace (4) | | First overtime period | | No scoring |
| Brian Foster 33 saves / 36 shots | | Goalie stats | | Adam Morrison 51 saves / 55 shots |

| Wheeling wins series 4–3 |

=== Western Conference ===
==== (1) Missouri Mavericks vs. (4) Allen Americans ====
| April 29 | Missouri Mavericks | 0–2 | Allen Americans | Silverstein Eye Centers Arena | Recap |
| No scoring | | First period | Greger Hanson (4) – 1:10 |
| No scoring | | Second period | Casey Pierro-Zabotel (3) – pp – 4:32 |
| No scoring | | Third period | No scoring |
| Josh Robinson 25 saves / 27 shots | | Goalie stats | Riley Gill 34 saves / 34 shots |

| April 30 | Missouri Mavericks | 5–2 | Allen Americans | Silverstein Eye Centers Arena | Recap |
| 1:28 – C. J. Ludwig (1); 6:11 – pp – Tyler Barnes (3); 16:35 – pp – Darren Nowick (2) | | First period | No scoring |
| 7:06 – Rocco Carzo (2) | | Second period | No scoring |
| 5:40 – pp – Tyler Barnes (4) | | Third period | Casey Pierro-Zabotel (4) – 15:04; Chad Costello (2) – pp – 16:37 |
| Parker Milner 21 saves / 23 shots | | Goalie stats | Riley Gill 13 saves / 17 shots Joel Rumpel 2 saves / 3 shots |

| May 4 | Allen Americans | 5–1 | Missouri Mavericks | Allen Event Center | Recap |
| 0:31 – Eric Roy (2); 6:40 – Vincent Arseneau (1) | | First period | No scoring |
| 13:59 – pp – Greger Hanson (5) | | Second period | Josh Holmstrom (3) – sh – 7:46 |
| 15:40 – Spencer Asuchak (1); 18:00 – en – Spencer Asuchak (2) | | Third period | No scoring |
| Riley Gill 25 saves / 26 shots | | Goalie stats | Parker Milner 31 saves / 35 shots |

| May 6 | Allen Americans | 4–2 | Missouri Mavericks | Allen Event Center | Recap |
| 14:29 – Vincent Arseneau (2) | | First period | No scoring |
| 14:29 – Gary Steffes (3) | | Second period | No scoring |
| 13:16 – Spencer Asuchak (3); 18:58 – en – Vincent Arseneau (3) | | Third period | Tyler Barnes (5) – pp – 0:11; Ross Johnston (1) – 3:26 |
| Riley Gill 35 saves / 37 shots | | Goalie stats | Josh Robinson 24 saves / 27 shots |

| May 8 | Allen Americans | 1–3 | Missouri Mavericks | Allen Event Center | Recap |
| Greger Hanson (6) – 4:33 | | First period | No scoring |
| No scoring | | Second period | 5:30 – Carter Verhaeghe (2); 18:28 – sh – Rocco Carzo (3) |
| No scoring | | Third period | 9:50 – Ross Johnston (2) |
| Riley Gill 24 saves / 27 shots | | Goalie stats | Josh Robinson 29 saves / 30 shots |

| May 10 | Missouri Mavericks | 1–5 | Allen Americans | Silverstein Eye Centers Arena | Recap |
| Ross Johnston (3) – 16:04 | | First period | 9:21 – pp – Chad Costello (3) |
| No scoring | | Second period | 4:27 – pp – Casey Pierro-Zabotel (5) |
| No scoring | | Third period | 1:12 – Greger Hanson (7); 17:24 – en – Greger Hanson (8); 19:21 – en – Dyson Stevenson (1) |
| Josh Robinson 25 saves / 28 shots | | Goalie stats | Riley Gill 32 saves / 33 shots |

| Allen wins series 4–2 |

==== (2) Fort Wayne Komets vs. (6) Utah Grizzlies ====
| April 29 | Fort Wayne Komets | 6–4 | Utah Grizzlies | Allen County War Memorial Coliseum | Recap |
| 0:32 – Cody Sol (1); 2:37 – Mike Embach (1); 3:23 – Troy Bourke (5); 18:47 – Shawn Szydlowski (4) | | First period | Ryan Hayes (3) – 9:03 |
| 15:21 – pp – Kyle Thomas (3) | | Second period | T. J. Syner (2) – pp – 2:02; Matt Berry (4) – 7:59; Barry Almeida (3) – pp – 9:24 |
| 16:27 – sh – Trevor Cheek (2) | | Third period | No scoring |
| Pat Nagle 23 saves / 27 shots | | Goalie stats | Ryan Faragher 3 saves / 6 shots Mark Owuya 18 saves / 21 shots |

| April 30 | Fort Wayne Komets | 5–3 | Utah Grizzlies | Allen County War Memorial Coliseum | Recap |
| 0:22 – Brett Perlini (2) | | First period | Barry Almeida (4) – 19:59 |
| 5:31 – Alex Belzile (5) | | Second period | Barry Almeida (5) – pp – 4:10 |
| 5:57 – Alex Belzile (6); 13:50 – Brett Perlini (3); 19:49 – en – Shawn Szydlowski (5) | | Third period | Charles Sarault (7) – sh – 15:10 |
| Pat Nagle 28 saves / 31 shots | | Goalie stats | Mark Owuya 34 saves / 38 shots |

| May 4 | Utah Grizzlies | 1–3 | Fort Wayne Komets | Maverik Center | Recap |
| 49 – Jon Puskar (2) | | First period | No scoring |
| No scoring | | Second period | No scoring |
| No scoring | | Third period | Shawn Szydlowski (6) – 1:50; Mike Embach (2) – pp – 5:21; Garrett Thompson (6) – 18:30 |
| Mark Owuya 28 saves 31 shots | | Goalie stats | Pat Nagle 19 saves / 20 shots |

| May 6 | Utah Grizzlies | 3–5 | Fort Wayne Komets | Maverik Center | Recap |
| 7:43 – pp – Ryan Hayes (4) | | First period | Shawn Szydlowski (7) – 4:21; Garrett Thompson (7) – 18:33 |
| 11:14 – pp – Ryan Hayes (5) | | Second period | Trevor Cheek (3) – pp – 7:39 |
| 6:36 – Marc Cantin (3) | | Third period | Garrett Thompson (8) – 8:16; Shawn Szydlowski (8) – en – 19:45 |
| Mark Owuya 25 saves / 29 shots | | Goalie stats | Pat Nagle 26 saves / 29 shots |

| Fort Wayne wins series 4–0 |

== Conference Finals ==
Home team is listed first.

=== Eastern Conference ===
==== (2) South Carolina Stingrays vs. (5) Wheeling Nailers ====
| May 13 | South Carolina Stingrays | 3–0 | Wheeling Nailers | North Charleston Coliseum | Recap |
| 4:54 – sh – Austin Fyten (5); 15:31 – Jared Staal (1) | | First period | No scoring |
| 0:49 – Bobby Shea (1) | | Second period | No scoring |
| No scoring | | Third period | No scoring |
| Vítek Vaněček 33 saves / 33 shots | | Goalie stats | Brian Foster 26 saves / 29 shots |

| May 14 | South Carolina Stingrays | 3–4 | 2OT | Wheeling Nailers | North Charleston Coliseum | Recap |
| 19:13 – Austin Fyten (6) | | First period | | No scoring |
| 16:35 – Joe Devin (10); 17:36 – Caleb Herbert (8) 17:36 | | Second period | | No scoring |
| No scoring | | Third period | | Clark Seymour (4) – 14:04; Paul Cianfrini (1) – 15:38; John McCarron (6) – 18:48 |
| No scoring | | Second overtime period | | Jarrett Burton (2) – pp – 5:03 |
| Vítek Vaněček 28 saves / 32 shots | | Goalie stats | | Franky Palazzese 32 saves / 35 shots |

| May 18 | Wheeling Nailers | 2–1 | South Carolina Stingrays | WesBanco Arena | Recap |
| No scoring | | First period | No scoring |
| No scoring | | Second period | Austin Fyten (7) – 13:10 |
| 6:36 – Jarrett Burton (3) 6:36; 13:34 – Derek Army (3) | | Third period | No scoring |
| Franky Palazzese 18 saves / 19 shots | | Goalie stats | Vítek Vaněček 29 saves / 31 shots |

| May 20 | Wheeling Nailers | 2–4 | South Carolina Stingrays | WesBanco Arena | Recap |
| No scoring | | First period | No scoring |
| 5:59 – Riley Brace (5) | | Second period | Caleb Herbert (9) – 4:57 |
| 0:48 – Ty Loney (5) | | Third period | Marcus Perrier (1) – 11:57; Brett Cameron (5) – pp – 15:09; David Pacan (2) – sh – en – 18:43 |
| Franky Palazzese 21 saves / 24 shots | | Goalie stats | Vítek Vaněček 17 saves / 19 shots |

| May 21 | Wheeling Nailers | 1–3 | South Carolina Stingrays | WesBanco Arena | Recap |
| Cody Wydo (7) – pp – 11:11 | | First period | No scoring |
| No scoring | | Second period | 9:40 – pp – Colton Saucerman (2) |
| No scoring | | Third period | 12:43 – David Pacan (3); 18:59 – en – Stephan Vigier (5) |
| Brian Foster 35 saves / 37 shots | | Goalie stats | Vítek Vaněček 27 saves / 28 shots |

| May 23 | South Carolina Stingrays | 3–4 | OT | Wheeling Nailers | North Charleston Coliseum | Recap |
| Kelly Zajac (3) – 0:43; Stephan Vigier (6) – 5:38 | | First period | | 10:12 – pp – Anton Zlobin (2) |
| No scoring | | Second period | | 11:58 – John McCarron (7) |
| Caleb Herbert (10) – 7:49 | | Third period | | 4:50 – pp – Anton Zlobin (3) |
| No scoring | | First overtime period | | 18:42 – Jarrett Burton (4) |
| Vítek Vaněček 30 saves / 34 shots | | Goalie stats | | Brian Foster 31 saves / 34 shots |

| May 24 | South Carolina Stingrays | 2–5 | Wheeling Nailers | North Charleston Coliseum | Recap |
| 3:29 – David Pacan (4); 18:26 – pp – Austin Fyten (8) | | First period | John McCarron (8) – 2:21; Cody Wydo (8) – 8:03 |
| No scoring | | Second period | No scoring |
| No scoring | | Third period | Jarrett Burton (5) – 0:24; Jordan Kwas (4) – 1:09; Ty Loney (6) – 5:03 |
| Vítek Vaněček 27 saves / 32 shots | | Goalie stats | Brian Foster 28 saves / 30 shots |

| Wheeling wins series 4–3 |

=== Western Conference ===
==== (2) Fort Wayne Komets vs. (4) Allen Americans ====
| May 13 | Fort Wayne Komets | 3–5 | Allen Americans | Allen County War Memorial Coliseum | Recap |
| 19:47 – Trevor Cheek (4) | | First period | Gary Steffes (4) – sh – 5:27; Greger Hanson (9) – pp – 9:03; Casey Pierro-Zabotel (6) – pp – 10:46 |
| No scoring | | Second period | No scoring |
| 3:16 – Trevor Cheek (5); 13:28 – Troy Bourke (6) | | Third period | Ņikita Jevpalovs (1) – 11:39; Vincent Arseneau (4) – en – 19:24 |
| Pat Nagle 21 saves / 25 shots | | Goalie stats | Riley Gill 23 saves / 26 shots |

| May 15 | Fort Wayne Komets | 2–3 | OT | Allen Americans | Allen County War Memorial Coliseum | Recap |
| No scoring | | First period | | Chad Costello (4) – pp – 8:50 |
| 0:22 – Garrett Meurs (1); 8:41 – pp – Troy Bourke (7) | | Second period | | Vincent Arseneau (5) – 19:30 |
| No scoring | | Third period | | No scoring |
| No scoring | | First overtime period | | Gary Steffes (5) – 0:56 |
| Pat Nagle 20 saves / 23 shots | | Goalie stats | | Riley Gill 8 saves / 9 shots Joel Rumpel 15 saves / 16 shots |

| May 19 | Allen Americans | 1–2 | Fort Wayne Komets | Allen Event Center | Recap |
| No scoring | | First period | Mike Embach (3) – 4:11 |
| No scoring | | Second period | Mike Embach (4) – 19:18 |
| Gary Steffes (6) 11:36 | | Third period | No scoring |
| Jake Hildebrand 35 saves / 37 shots | | Goalie stats | Pat Nagle 27 saves / 28 shots |

| May 21 | Allen Americans | 6–5 | OT | Fort Wayne Komets | Allen Event Center | Recap |
| 6:54 – David Makowski (3) | | First period | | Cody Sol (2) – 19:46 |
| 7:46 – pp – Gary Steffes (7) | | Second period | | Mike Embach (5) – 0:45; Garrett Thompson (9) – pp – 3:15; Garrett Thompson (10) – 9:18; Shawn Szydlowski (9) – 11:17 |
| 1:16 – pp – Tristan King (4); 4:49 – pp – Greger Hanson (10); 10:33 – David Makowski (4) | | Third period | | No scoring |
| 3:46 – J. P. LaFontaine (1) | | First overtime period | | No scoring |
| Riley Gill 14 saves / 19 shots Jake Hildebrand 17 saves / 17 shots | | Goalie stats | | Pat Nagle 24 saves / 30 shots |

| May 22 | Allen Americans | 6–4 | Fort Wayne Komets | Allen Event Center | Recap |
| Casey Pierro-Zabotel (7) – 14:25; David Makowski (5) – pp – 17:26 | | First period | 6:30 – pp – Cody Corbett (1); 10:31 – Shawn Szydlowski (10) |
| Spencer Asuchak (4) – 8:48; Vincent Arseneau (6) – 9:33 | | Second period | No scoring |
| Eric Roy (3) – pp – 3:39; Greger Hanson (11) – en – 19:47 | | Third period | Jamie Schaafsma (3) – 1:21; Garrett Meurs (2) – 16:41 |
| Jake Hildebrand 44 saves / 48 shots | | Goalie stats | Spencer Martin 11 saves / 16 shots Pat Nagle 7 saves / 7 shots |

| Allen wins series 4–1 |

== Kelly Cup Finals ==
Home team is listed first.

=== (West #4) Allen Americans vs. (East #5) Wheeling Nailers ===
| May 28 | Allen Americans | 5–3 | Wheeling Nailers | Allen Event Center | Recap |
| No scoring | | First period | No scoring |
| 1:15 – pp – Tristan King (5); 12:10 – Tristan King (6); 15:35 – pp – Greger Hanson (12); 19:03 – Spencer Asuchak (5) 19:03 | | Second period | Shane Bakker (5) – sh – 15:11 |
| Gary Steffes (8) 18:03 | | Third period | Anton Zlobin (4) – pp – 9:06; John McCarron (9) – pp – 10:29 |
| Jake Hildebrand 25 saves / 28 shots | | Goalie stats | Brian Foster 27 saves / 32 shots |

| May 29 | Allen Americans | 6–7 | Wheeling Nailers | Allen Event Center | Recap |
| No scoring | | First period | Derek Army (4) – pp – 6:34; Clark Seymour (5) – 14:30; Cody Wydo (9) – pp – 17:52 |
| 15:16 – Chad Costello (5) | | Second period | Anton Zlobin (5) – pp – 6:03; Jarrett Burton (6) – 9:43; Mathew Maione (6) – 16:27; John McCarron (10) – sh – en – 18:55 |
| 2:21 – Spencer Asuchak (6); 4:20 – Aaron Gens (1); 7:27 – pp – Gary Steffes (9); 8:51 – Casey Pierro-Zabotel (7); 10:03 – Gary Steffes (10) | | Third period | No scoring |
| Jake Hildebrand 6 saves / 9 shots Joel Rumpel 12 saves / 15 shots | | Goalie stats | Brian Foster 23 saves / 29 shots Franky Palazzese 4 saves / 4 shots |

| June 1 | Wheeling Nailers | 3–2 | Allen Americans | WesBanco Arena | Recap |
| No scoring | | First period | No scoring |
| 3:18 – Ty Loney (7); 13:46 – pp – Anton Zlobin (6) | | Second period | Gary Steffes (11) – 4:01 |
| 7:25 – James Melindy (1) | | Third period | Greger Hanson (13) – pp – 4:22 |
| Franky Palazzese 28 saves / 30 shots | | Goalie stats | Riley Gill 24 saves / 27 shots |

| June 3 | Wheeling Nailers | 2–4 | Allen Americans | WesBanco Arena | Recap |
| 19:44 – Dan O'Donoghue (3) | | First period | Gary Steffes (12) 16:02 |
| 14:17 – Cody Wydo (10) | | Second period | Ņikita Javpalovs (2) – 18:15 |
| No scoring | | Third period | Chad Costello (6)– 3:38; Eric Roy (4) – en – 19:26 |
| Franky Palazzese 25 saves / 28 shots | | Goalie stats | Riley Gill 32 saves / 34 shots |

| June 4 | Wheeling Nailers | 2–3 | OT | Allen Americans | WesBanco Arena | Recap |
| No scoring | | First period | | No scoring |
| Jarrett Burton (7) – 12:16 | | Second period | | No scoring |
| Cody Wydo (11) – pp – 16:03 | | Third period | | 3:33 – Chad Costello (7); 7:35 – Vincent Arseneau (8) |
| No scoring | | First overtime period | | 0:17 – Greger Hanson (14) |
| Franky Palazzese 13 saves / 16 shots | | Goalie stats | | Riley Gill 24 saves / 26 shots |

| June 9 | Allen Americans | 4–2 | Wheeling Nailers | Allen Event Center | Recap |
| Tristan King (7) – pp – 4:44; Greger Hanson (15) – pp – 9:23 | | First period | No scoring |
| No scoring | | Second period | 9:32 – John McCarron (11) |
| Eric Roy (5) – pp – 10:04; Gary Steffes (13) – en – 19:28 | | Third period | 12:54 – Cody Wydo (12) |
| Riley Gill 42 saves / 44 shots | | Goalie stats | Brian Foster 24 saves / 27 shots |

| Allen wins series 4–2 |

== Statistical leaders ==
=== Skaters ===
These are the top ten skaters based on points.

| Player | Team | GP | G | A | Pts | +/– | PIM |
|---|---|---|---|---|---|---|---|
| Chad Costello | Allen Americans | 24 | 7 | 29 | 36 | 0 | 4 |
| Riley Brace | Wheeling Nailers | 26 | 5 | 22 | 27 | -5 | 30 |
| Greger Hanson | Allen Americans | 23 | 15 | 8 | 23 | -2 | 18 |
| John McCarron | Wheeling Nailers | 25 | 11 | 12 | 23 | +5 | 42 |
| Mathew Maione | Wheeling Nailers | 26 | 6 | 17 | 23 | +4 | 20 |
| Cody Wydo | Wheeling Nailers | 26 | 12 | 9 | 21 | -2 | 12 |
| Eric Roy | Allen Americans | 23 | 5 | 16 | 21 | +12 | 8 |
| David Makowski | Allen Americans | 18 | 5 | 15 | 20 | +5 | 20 |
| Shawn Szydlowski | Fort Wayne Komets | 16 | 10 | 9 | 19 | +6 | 15 |
| Austin Fyten | South Carolina Stingrays | 19 | 8 | 11 | 19 | +5 | 28 |

GP = Games played; G = Goals; A = Assists; Pts = Points; +/– = Plus/minus; PIM = Penalty minutes

=== Goaltending ===
This is a combined table of the top five goaltenders based on goals against average and the top five goaltenders based on save percentage, with at least 240 minutes played. The table is sorted by GAA, and the criteria for inclusion are bolded.

| Player | Team | GP | W | L | OTL | SA | GA | GAA | SV% | SO | TOI |
|---|---|---|---|---|---|---|---|---|---|---|---|
| Mark Dekanich | South Carolina Stingrays | 10 | 5 | 3 | 1 | 219 | 17 | **1.69** | 0.922 | 2 | 603 |
| Josh Robinson | Missouri Mavericks | 7 | 4 | 3 | 0 | 202 | 15 | **2.16** | **0.926** | 0 | 416 |
| Ken Appleby | Adirondack Thunder | 12 | 7 | 4 | 1 | 363 | 29 | **2.31** | 0.920 | 1 | 754 |
| Vítek Vaněček | South Carolina Stingrays | 11 | 6 | 2 | 2 | 278 | 24 | **2.31** | 0.914 | 1 | 624 |
| Riley Gill | Allen Americans | 19 | 12 | 5 | 0 | 508 | 39 | **2.35** | **0.923** | 1 | 997 |
| Adam Morrison | Reading Royals | 6 | 3 | 3 | 0 | 184 | 14 | 2.45 | **0.924** | 0 | 344 |
| Philippe Desrosiers | Idaho Steelheads | 7 | 3 | 3 | 1 | 208 | 16 | 2.47 | **0.923** | 0 | 390 |
| Brad Thiessen | Cincinnati Cyclones | 7 | 3 | 2 | 2 | 258 | 19 | 2.51 | **0.926** | 0 | 454 |

GP = Games played; W = Wins; L = Losses; OTL = Overtime losses; SA = Shots against; GA = Goals against; GAA = Goals against average; SV% = Save percentage; SO = Shutouts; TOI = Time on ice (in minutes)

== See also ==
- 2015–16 ECHL season
- List of ECHL seasons

| Preceded by 2015 Kelly Cup playoffs | Kelly Cup Playoffs; 2016 | Succeeded by 2017 Kelly Cup playoffs |
