= Teddy Purcell =

Canadian ice hockey player (born 1985)

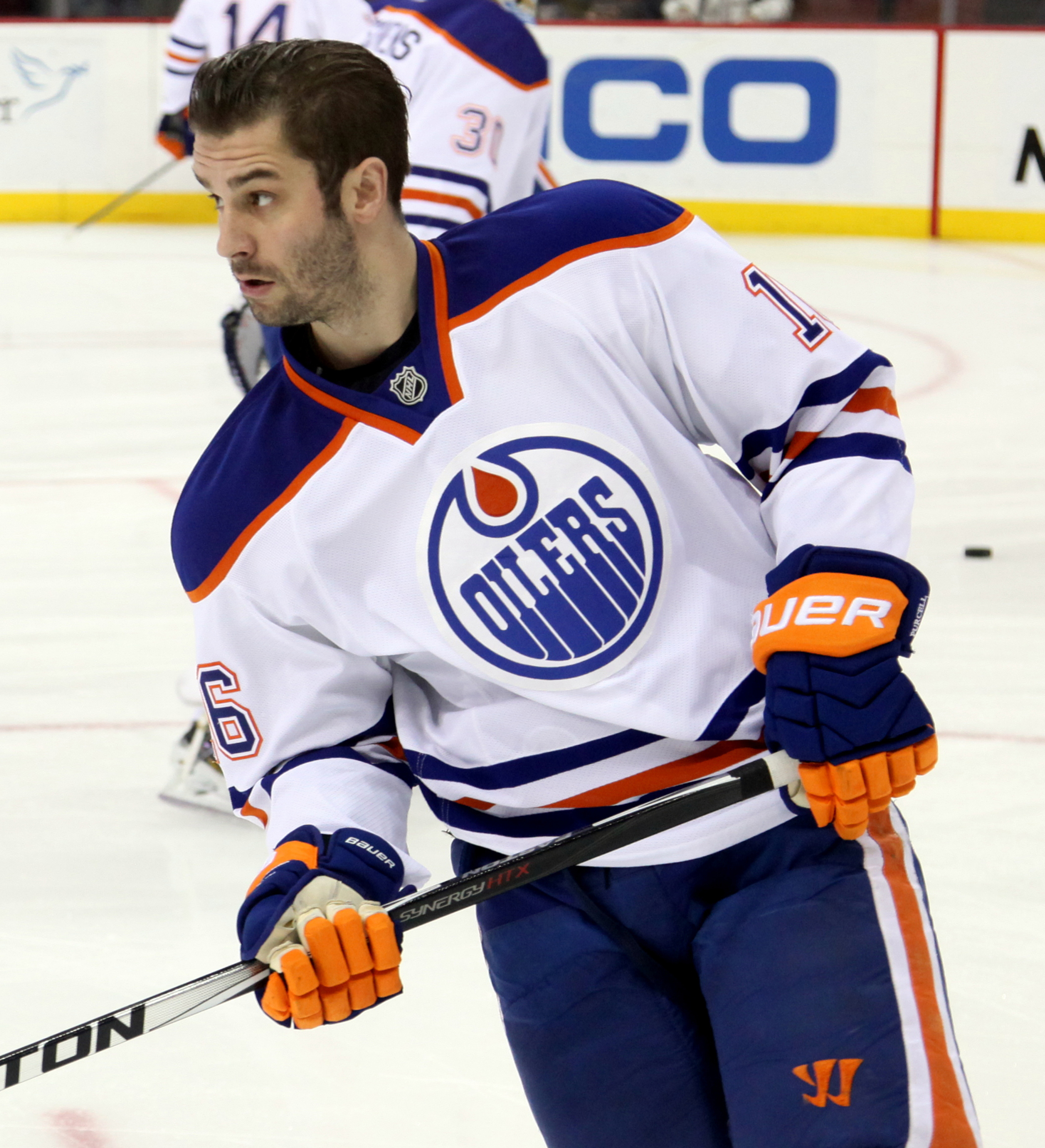
- Purcell in February 2015
- Born: September 8, 1985 (age 40) St. John's, Newfoundland, Canada
- Height: 6 ft 2 in (188 cm)
- Weight: 198 lb (90 kg; 14 st 2 lb)
- Position: Right wing
- Shot: Right
- Played for: Los Angeles Kings; Tampa Bay Lightning; Edmonton Oilers; Florida Panthers; Avangard Omsk
- National team: Canada
- NHL draft: Undrafted
- Playing career: 2007–2018

Edward Purcell (born September 8, 1985) is a Canadian former professional ice hockey right winger who played in the National Hockey League (NHL) for the Los Angeles Kings, Tampa Bay Lightning, Edmonton Oilers and Florida Panthers. He was not drafted by any NHL team. Purcell is a current pro scout for the Montreal Canadiens.

== Playing career ==
=== Amateur ===
Purcell moved to the United States to study at and play hockey for Lake Forest Academy, a prep school north of Chicago. He then played junior hockey for the Cedar Rapids RoughRiders of the United States Hockey League (USHL), where he set the career scoring mark, scoring 138 points on 39 goals and 99 assists in two seasons. He was the team leader in scoring his first season with the RoughRiders, tallying 67 points. In his second season, he was outscored by teammate Chad Costello by one point, scoring 71 points. Undrafted by an NHL team in his first year of draft eligibility, Purcell then played one season of college hockey at the University of Maine with the Black Bears ice hockey team in 2006–07.

=== Professional ===
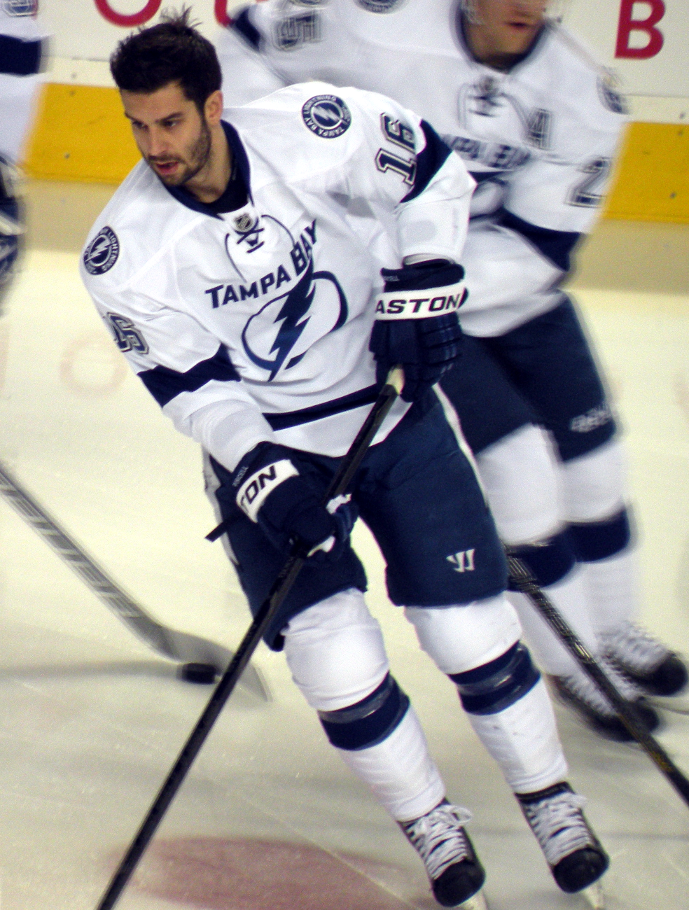
Purcell as a member of the Lightning.

In 2007–08, his first professional season, Purcell played most of the year in the American Hockey League (AHL) with the Manchester Monarchs, but also played ten games in the NHL with the Los Angeles Kings. On February 15, 2008, Purcell scored his first NHL goal against the Calgary Flames' Miikka Kiprusoff at Staples Center in Los Angeles. In the AHL, he was named to the 2008 AHL All-Star Classic and became the first rookie to score an All-Star Classic hat-trick. He also scored the decisive goal in the shootout to give the Canadian All Stars a 9–8 win over the PlanetUSA All-Stars. Purcell was named the game's MVP. Finishing his rookie AHL season with 83 points in 67 games, Purcell won the Dudley "Red" Garrett Memorial Award as the AHL's top rookie. In 2008–09, Purcell split the season between the Monarchs and Kings, playing 40 games in the NHL while scoring 4 goals and 12 assists for 16 points.

At the NHL trade deadline in 2010, Purcell was traded (along with a third-round draft pick) to the Tampa Bay Lightning in exchange for forward Jeff Halpern. Purcell finished the 2009–10 season with 15 points. On July 6, 2010, new Lightning general manager Steve Yzerman re-signed Purcell (along with another former University of Maine player, Mike Lundin) to a one-year contract. Purcell then blossomed under new Lightning head coach Guy Boucher. On February 23, 2011, Purcell scored his first NHL hat trick, against the Phoenix Coyotes. He went on to finish with 51 points in the regular season, and 17 points in 18 games during the 2011 Stanley Cup playoffs.

On July 20, 2011, Purcell avoided arbitration by signing a two-year, $4.75 million contract extension with Tampa Bay just hours before his arbitration meeting. On April 7, 2012, in the Lightning's last game of the 2011–12 regular season, Purcell recorded his second career NHL hat trick, helping Tampa Bay win 4–3 in overtime. After a breakout season in which he scored 24 goals and 65 points, Purcell was named to Canada's roster for the 2012 IIHF World Championship.

On July 10, 2012, Purcell signed a three-year contract extension with the Lightning to keep him with the club through to the 2015–16 season.

On June 29, 2014, Purcell was traded to the Edmonton Oilers in exchange for Sam Gagner, who was himself immediately traded to the Arizona Coyotes.

In his second season with the Oilers in 2015–16, with the club out of contention for the Stanley Cup playoffs and in the last year of his contract, after scoring 32 points in 61 games, on February 27, 2016, Purcell was traded to the Florida Panthers in exchange for a third-round pick in the 2016 NHL entry draft.

On July 1, 2016, Purcell as a free agent opted to return to his original club, the Los Angeles Kings, signing a one-year, $1.6 million contract. In the 2016–17 season, Purcell endured an unsuccessful reunion with the Kings, contributing with just 2 assists in 12 games before he was waived and reassigned to the club's AHL affiliate, the Ontario Reign, for the remainder of the season. Purcell regained his offensive production with Ontario, collecting 38 points in as many games.

As a free agent from the Kings, and going unsigned over the summer, on September 14, 2017, it was announced Purcell had joined the Boston Bruins on a professional try-out (PTO) contract to attend training camp. After completing the pre-season with the Bruins, Purcell was released from his PTO without a contract on October 2, 2017.

== Career statistics ==
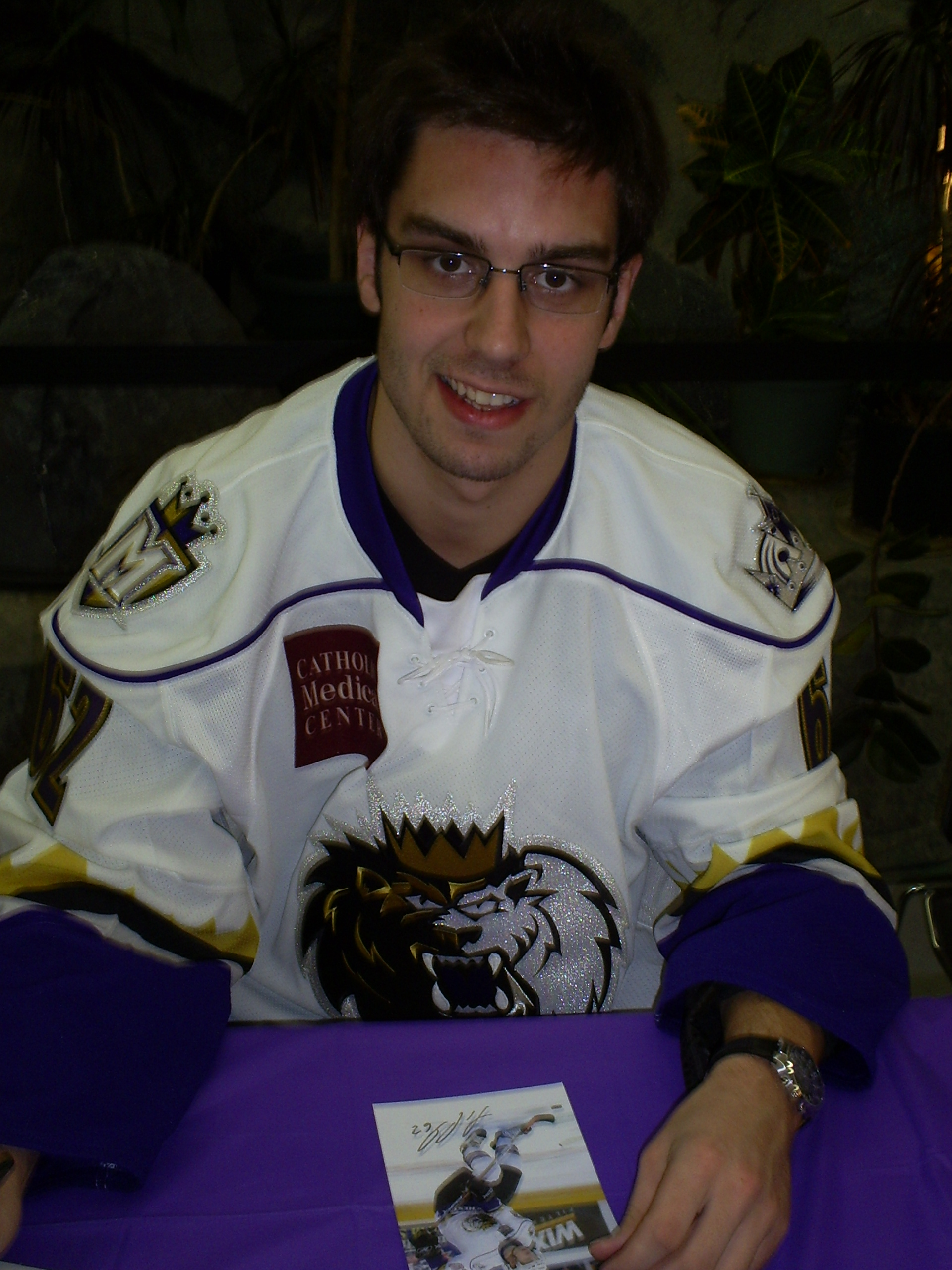
Purcell with the Manchester Monarchs in 2009.

=== Regular season and playoffs ===
			Regular season					Playoffs
Season	Team	League	GP	G	A	Pts	PIM	GP	G	A	Pts	PIM
2003–04	Notre Dame Hounds	SJHL	51	21	25	46	8	—	—	—	—	—
2004–05	Cedar Rapids RoughRiders	USHL	58	20	47	67	22	11	5	9	14	4
2005–06	Cedar Rapids RoughRiders	USHL	55	19	52	71	14	8	3	8	11	4
2006–07	University of Maine	HE	40	16	27	43	34	—	—	—	—	—
2007–08	Manchester Monarchs	AHL	67	25	58	83	34	4	0	3	3	0
2007–08	Los Angeles Kings	NHL	10	1	2	3	0	—	—	—	—	—
2008–09	Manchester Monarchs	AHL	38	16	22	38	12	—	—	—	—	—
2008–09	Los Angeles Kings	NHL	40	4	12	16	4	—	—	—	—	—
2009–10	Los Angeles Kings	NHL	41	3	3	6	4	—	—	—	—	—
2009–10	Tampa Bay Lightning	NHL	19	3	6	9	6	—	—	—	—	—
2010–11	Tampa Bay Lightning	NHL	81	17	34	51	10	18	6	11	17	2
2011–12	Tampa Bay Lightning	NHL	81	24	41	65	16	—	—	—	—	—
2012–13	Tampa Bay Lightning	NHL	48	11	25	36	12	—	—	—	—	—
2013–14	Tampa Bay Lightning	NHL	81	12	30	42	14	4	1	0	1	0
2014–15	Edmonton Oilers	NHL	82	12	22	34	24	—	—	—	—	—
2015–16	Edmonton Oilers	NHL	61	11	21	32	10	—	—	—	—	—
2015–16	Florida Panthers	NHL	15	3	8	11	2	6	2	0	2	0
2016–17	Los Angeles Kings	NHL	12	0	2	2	0	—	—	—	—	—
2016–17	Ontario Reign	AHL	38	10	28	38	2	5	0	2	2	2
2017–18	Avangard Omsk	KHL	21	3	9	12	4	7	1	4	5	4
NHL totals			571	101	206	307	102	28	9	11	20	2

=== International ===
Year	Team	Event	Result	GP	G	A	Pts	PIM
2012	Canada	WC	5th	8	1	1	2	0
Senior totals				8	1	1	2	0

== Awards and honours ==
Award	Year
USHL
Clark Cup Championship (Cedar Rapids RoughRiders)	2005
College
All-Hockey East Rookie Team	2007
AHL
All-Rookie Team	2008
First All-Star Team	2008
Dudley "Red" Garrett Memorial Award	2008
All-Star Game	2008, 2009

Awards and achievements
Preceded by Brandon Yip	Hockey East Rookie of the Year; 2006–07	Succeeded by Colin Wilson
