= Brian Foster (ice hockey) =

American ice hockey player (born 1987)

- Born: February 4, 1987 (age 39) Pembroke, New Hampshire, U.S.
- Height: 6 ft 2 in (188 cm)
- Weight: 174 lb (79 kg; 12 st 6 lb)
- Position: Goaltender
- Catches: Right
- AHL team Former teams: WBS Penguins; Florida Panthers; Lillehammer IK
- NHL draft: 161st overall, 2005; Florida Panthers
- Playing career: 2010–present

Brian Foster (born February 4, 1987) is an American professional ice hockey goaltender who is currently playing for the Wheeling Nailers in the ECHL on loan from Wilkes-Barre/Scranton Penguins of the American Hockey League (AHL).

== Early life ==
Foster was born in Pembroke, New Hampshire. Before turning professional, he attended the University of New Hampshire where he played four seasons with the New Hampshire Wildcats men's ice hockey team which competes in NCAA's Division I in the Hockey East conference.

== Career ==
Foster was selected by the Florida Panthers of the National Hockey League in the fifth round (161st overall) of the 2005 NHL entry draft.

During the 2011–12 season, Foster was recalled from AHL affiliate, the San Antonio Rampage, by the Panthers on February 1, 2012, to serve as the back-up for Scott Clemmensen, while starter Jose Theodore was injured. He made his NHL debut on February 4, 2012, against the Tampa Bay Lightning, relieving Clemmensen during the second period of the game. This would represent Foster's only NHL appearance to date, as he was reassigned to the Rampage four days later on February 8, 2012.

On February 15, 2013, while playing for the Cincinnati Cyclones, Foster became the 11th goaltender in ECHL history to be credited with a goal in the game between the Cyclones and the visiting Trenton Titans.

On August 20, 2013, Foster signed as a free agent to a one-year ECHL contract with the Stockton Thunder.

After one season with Lillehammer IK in the Norwegian GET-ligaen, Foster transferred to the Danish League, signing a two-year deal with Esbjerg Energy on July 2, 2015. Foster was later released from his contract in Denmark a month later to sign an AHL contract with the Wilkes-Barre/Scranton Penguins on August 3, 2015. He was later assigned to ECHL affiliate, the Wheeling Nailers, to begin the 2015–16 season.

== Career statistics ==
			Regular season									Playoffs
Season	Team	League	GP	W	L	T/OT	MIN	GA	SO	GAA	SV%	GP	W	L	MIN	GA	SO	GAA	SV%
2004–05	New Hampshire Jr. Monarchs	EJHL	41	30	6	4	2339	98	3	2.51	.920	—	—	—	—	—	—	—	—
2005–06	Des Moines Buccaneers	USHL	26	12	9	3	1516	71	0	2.81	.913	1	0	0	12	0	0	0.00	1.000
2006–07	U. of New Hampshire	HE	7	2	2	0	298	11	2	2.21	.933	—	—	—	—	—	—	—	—
2007–08	U. of New Hampshire	HE	6	2	2	2	372	19	0	3.06	.899	—	—	—	—	—	—	—	—
2008–09	U. of New Hampshire	HE	35	19	11	4	2080	93	3	2.68	.910	—	—	—	—	—	—	—	—
2009–10	U. of New Hampshire	HE	38	17	14	7	2297	114	0	2.98	.908	—	—	—	—	—	—	—	—
2010–11	Bossier-Shreveport Mudbugs	CHL	20	9	9	1	1124	60	0	3.20	.884	—	—	—	—	—	—	—	—
2010–11	Cincinnati Cyclones	ECHL	19	11	6	1	1098	42	2	2.30	.918	4	1	3	292	11	0	2.26	.899
2011–12	San Antonio Rampage	AHL	12	4	6	0	609	37	0	3.64	.885	—	—	—	—	—	—	—	—
2011–12	Cincinnati Cyclones	ECHL	29	16	11	2	1683	78	3	2.78	.902	—	—	—	—	—	—	—	—
2011–12	Florida Panthers	NHL	1	0	0	0	5	0	0	0.00	1.000	—	—	—	—	—	—	—	—
2012–13	Cincinnati Cyclones	ECHL	32	19	7	4	1796	80	0	2.67	.907	—	—	—	—	—	—	—	—
2012–13	San Antonio Rampage	AHL	7	1	3	0	309	15	0	2.92	.910	—	—	—	—	—	—	—	—
2013–14	Stockton Thunder	ECHL	45	23	16	5	2695	134	1	2.98	.901	—	—	—	—	—	—	—	—
2014–15	Lillehammer IK	GET	43	—	—	—	—	—	—	2.94	.905	4	—	—	—	—	—	4.15	.879
2015–16	Wheeling Nailers	ECHL	22	10	8	3	1266	57	1	2.70	.908	16	9	7	953	48	0	3.02	.902
2015–16	Wilkes-Barre/Scranton Penguins	AHL	9	3	3	1	462	27	1	3.51	.857	—	—	—	—	—	—	—	—
NHL totals			1	0	0	0	5	0	0	0.00	1.000	—	—	—	—	—	—	—	—

== Awards and honors ==
Award	Year
College
All-Hockey East First Team	2009–10
AHCA East Second-Team All-American	2009–10
