= Daniel New =

American ice hockey player

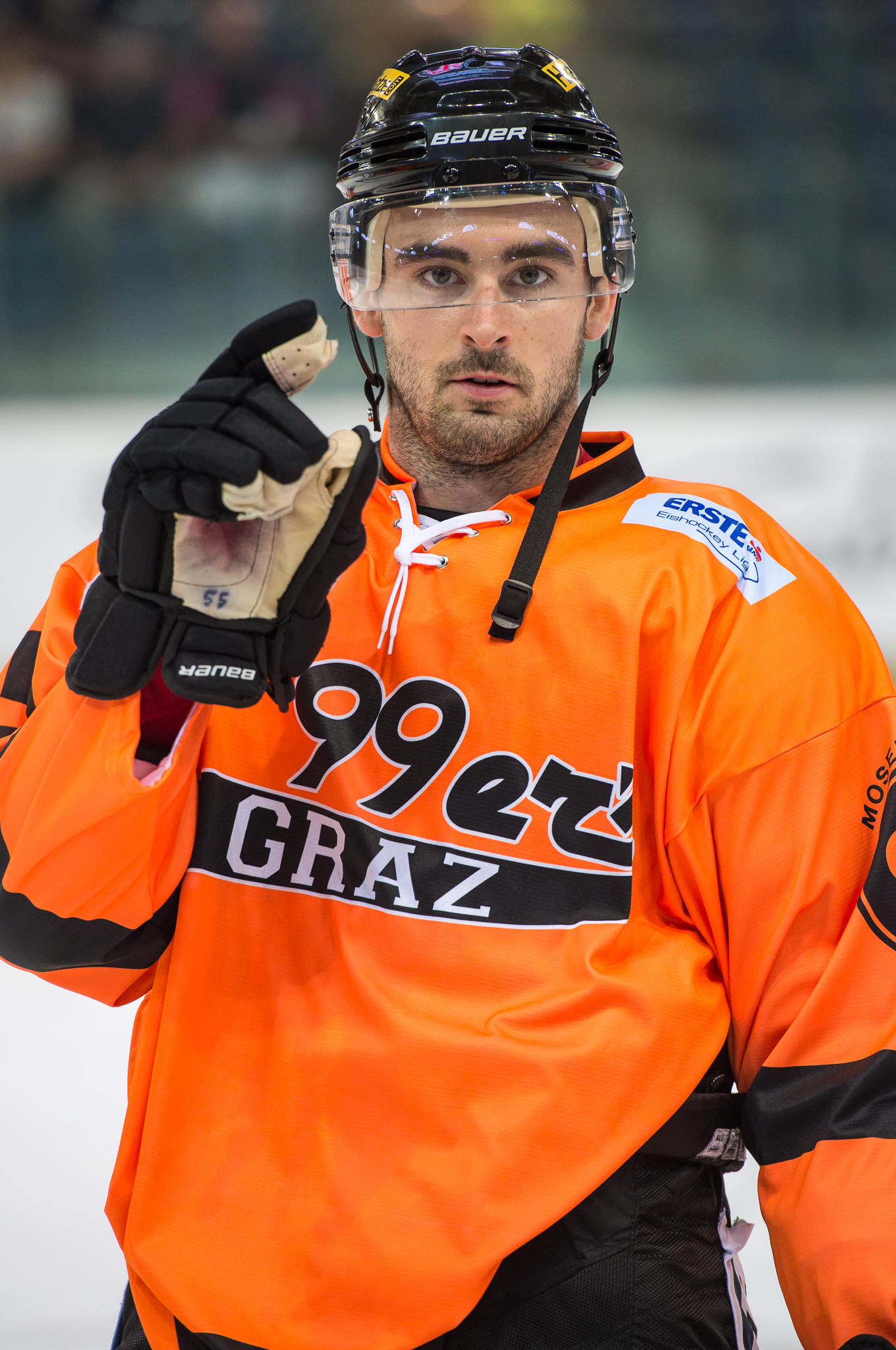
- Born: February 23, 1989 (age 36) White Plains, New York, U.S.
- Height: 6 ft 1 in (185 cm)
- Weight: 194 lb (88 kg; 13 st 12 lb)
- Position: Defense
- Shot: Left
- Played for: Springfield Falcons; Binghamton Senators; Graz 99ers
- NHL draft: Undrafted
- Playing career: 2012–2017

Daniel New (born February 23, 1989) is an American former professional ice hockey defenseman. He last played with the Florida Everblades in the ECHL.

== Playing career ==
New attended Providence College where he played four seasons (2008 – 2012) of NCAA hockey with the Providence Friars men's ice hockey team, scoring 8 goals and 31 assists for 39 points, while earning 157 penalty minutes, in 128 games played.

April 2, 2012, New began his professional career when he signed with the Springfield Falcons, and skated in two games with the American Hockey League team before the end of the 2011–12 AHL season.

After three seasons within the Binghamton Senators organization, New opted to venture overseas in agreeing to a one-year contract with Austrian club, Graz 99ers of the Erste Bank Eishockey Liga on May 27, 2015. Four games into the 2015–16 season with the 99ers, New opted for a mutual termination of his contract to return to North America. On September 26, 2015, New agreed to a try-out with former AHL club, the Springfield Falcons. Limited through injury, New appeared in 18 games for the Falcons before ending the season with ECHL outfit, the Florida Everblades, in a first round defeat.

He was initially diagnosed with thyroid cancer in April 2014. Unsigned over the summer, and approaching opening night of the 2016–17 season, New opted to continue in the ECHL signing a one-year deal with the South Carolina Stingrays on October 22, 2016. He contributed with just 1 goal in 10 games before he was traded by the Stingrays in a return to the Everblades on November 25, 2016.
