= Shawn Szydlowski =

American ice hockey player

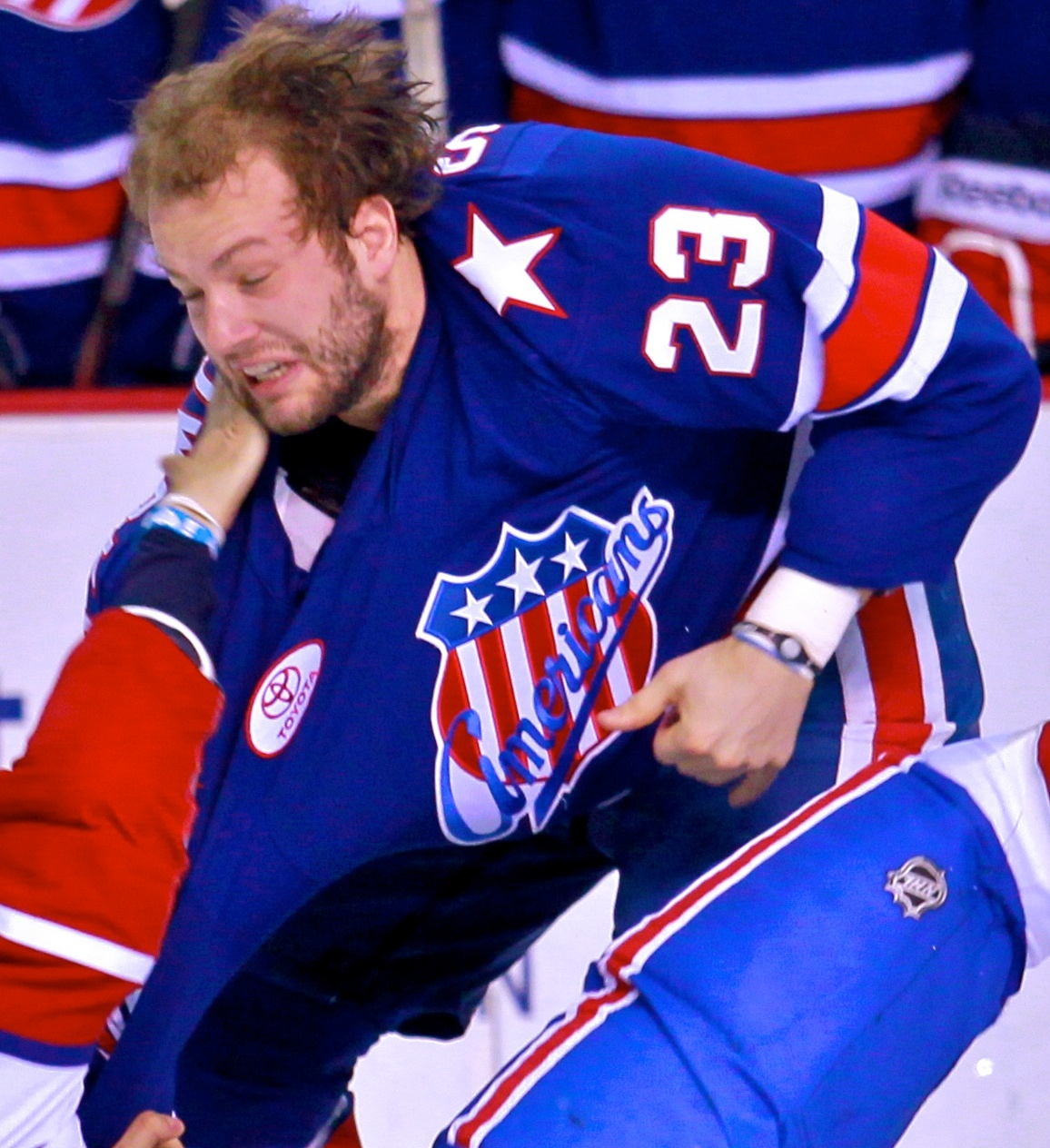
- Szydlowski with the Rochester Americans in 2011
- Born: August 5, 1990 (age 34); St. Clair Shores, Michigan, U.S.
- Height: 6 ft 0 in (183 cm)
- Weight: 209 lb (95 kg; 14 st 13 lb)
- Position: Right wing
- Shoots: Right
- ECHL team Former teams: Fort Wayne Komets; Portland Pirates; Rochester Americans; Binghamton Senators; Cleveland Monsters; Norfolk Admirals; Frisk Asker
- NHL draft: Undrafted
- Playing career: 2011–present

Shawn Szydlowski (born August 5, 1990) is an American professional ice hockey Winger who is currently playing with the Fort Wayne Komets of the ECHL.

== Playing career ==
Prior to turning professional, Szydlowski played four seasons (2007–11) in the Ontario Hockey League with the Erie Otters On April 8, 2011, the Buffalo Sabres of the National Hockey League (NHL) signed Szydlowski as an undrafted free agent to a three-year entry-level contract.

In the final year of his entry-level deal with the Sabres, Szydlowski was assigned to ECHL club, the Fort Wayne Komets for the duration of the 2013–14 season. In 63 games with the Komets, he matched a career high with 26 points before stepping up his offensive game in the Kelly Cup playoffs to produce 11 points in as many games.

On July 29, 2014, with the Sabres not extending a new contract offer, Szydlowski signed a one-year ECHL contract to remain in Fort Wayne.

In his sixth year with the Komets in the 2017–18 season, Szydlowski increased his offensive output to lead the ECHL in scoring with 79 points in 64 games, earning selection to the First All-Star Team and earning honors as the ECHL's MVP.

After helping the Komets reach the Conference Finals, Szydlowski opted to continue his career abroad, agreeing to a one-year deal with Norwegian outfit, Frisk Asker of the GET-ligaen on June 20, 2018. In the 2018–19 season, Szydlowski featured in 11 games with Asker in scoring 7 points before opting to terminate his contract with the club and return to the United States for personal reasons on November 2, 2018.

Having completed his ninth season with the Fort Wayne Komets, Szydlowski left the club and in need of a new challenge continued in the ECHL by signing with the Orlando Solar Bears for the 2022–23 season on August 4, 2022.

On September 28, 2023 it was announced by the Fort Wayne Komets that Szydlowski was returning for his 10th season in Fort Wayne for the 2023-24 season.

== Career statistics ==
			Regular season					Playoffs
Season	Team	League	GP	G	A	Pts	PIM	GP	G	A	Pts	PIM
2007–08	Erie Otters	OHL	66	9	16	25	57	—	—	—	—	—
2008–09	Erie Otters	OHL	61	23	23	46	80	5	3	0	3	14
2009–10	Erie Otters	OHL	65	21	27	48	90	4	1	4	5	2
2010–11	Erie Otters	OHL	66	41	37	78	79	7	2	5	7	14
2010–11	Portland Pirates	AHL	2	0	0	0	0	—	—	—	—	—
2011–12	Rochester Americans	AHL	53	0	8	8	21	—	—	—	—	—
2011–12	Gwinnett Gladiators	ECHL	6	1	2	3	0	—	—	—	—	—
2012–13	Rochester Americans	AHL	7	0	0	0	4	—	—	—	—	—
2012–13	Fort Worth Brahmas	CHL	45	10	16	26	41	7	2	4	6	12
2013–14	Fort Wayne Komets	ECHL	63	11	15	26	46	11	6	5	11	4
2014–15	Fort Wayne Komets	ECHL	57	38	36	74	50	8	2	4	6	4
2014–15	Binghamton Senators	AHL	3	0	0	0	2	—	—	—	—	—
2014–15	Lake Erie Monsters	AHL	5	0	0	0	5	—	—	—	—	—
2014–15	Norfolk Admirals	AHL	3	0	1	1	0	—	—	—	—	—
2015–16	Fort Wayne Komets	ECHL	62	25	50	75	82	16	10	9	19	15
2016–17	Fort Wayne Komets	ECHL	50	25	41	66	94	10	2	7	9	4
2016–17	Cleveland Monsters	AHL	7	1	0	1	2	—	—	—	—	—
2017–18	Fort Wayne Komets	ECHL	64	31	48	79	76	17	4	13	17	16
2018–19	Frisk Asker	GET	11	4	3	7	35	—	—	—	—	—
2018–19	Fort Wayne Komets	ECHL	59	19	36	55	80	6	1	2	3	6
2019–20	Fort Wayne Komets	ECHL	55	15	41	56	74	—	—	—	—	—
2020–21	Fort Wayne Komets	ECHL	35	4	25	29	55	9	2	9	11	4
2021–22	Fort Wayne Komets	ECHL	31	11	16	27	40	6	0	2	2	14
2022–23	Orlando Solar Bears	ECHL	46	14	15	29	55	—	—	—	—	—
2023–24	Fort Wayne Komets	ECHL	52	10	14	24	49	—	—	—	—	—
AHL totals			80	1	9	10	34	—	—	—	—	—

== Awards and honors ==
Award	Year
ECHL
First All-Star Team	2015, 2018
Second all-star team	2016
MVP	2018
Kelly Cup (Fort Wayne Komets)	2021
