= Mathew Maione =

Canadian ice hockey player

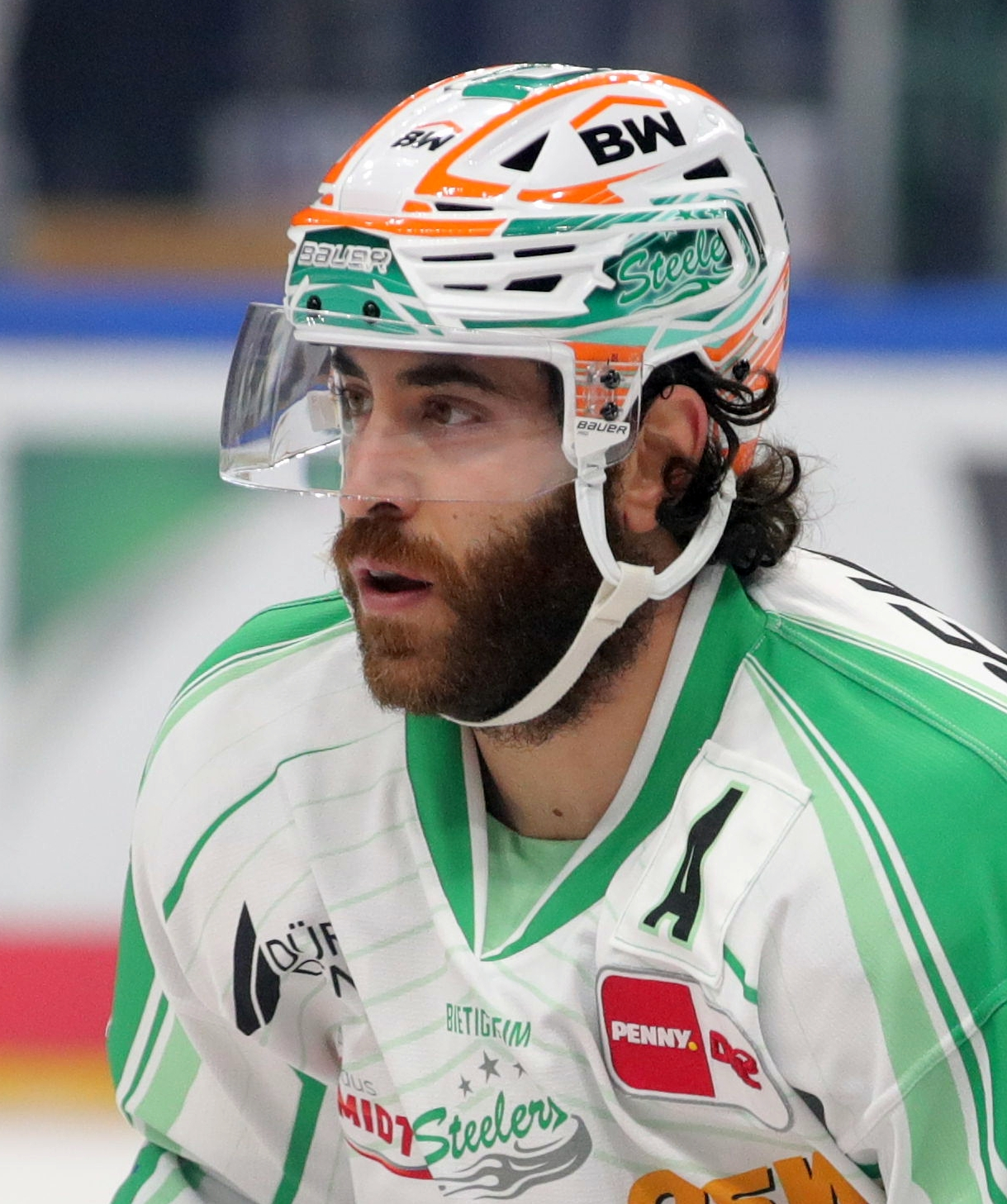
- Born: November 21, 1990 (age 35) Toronto, Ontario, Canada
- Height: 5 ft 9 in (175 cm)
- Weight: 196 lb (89 kg; 14 st 0 lb)
- Position: Defenceman
- Shoots: Left
- Allsv team Former teams: IF Björklöven; HC '05 Banská Bystrica; KalPa; Dinamo Riga; Kunlun Red Star; HC Dinamo Minsk; EHC München; HC Bolzano; Bietigheim Steelers; AIK
- NHL draft: Undrafted
- Playing career: 2014–present

Mathew Maione (born November 21, 1990) is a Canadian ice hockey defenceman playing for IF Björklöven of the HockeyAllsvenskan (Allsv).

== Playing career ==
Born in Toronto, Ontario, Maione joined the Niagara IceDogs of the Ontario Hockey League beginning in the 2007–08 season. After two seasons with the IceDogs, he was traded to Guelph Storm during the 2009–10 offseason in exchange for a 10th round pick in the 2011 OHL Draft. After finishing the 2009–10 season with the Storm, he attended the University of Prince Edward Island for four years while majoring in psychology and biology. After earning his degree, Maione signed with the Fort Wayne Komets in the ECHL. He re-signed with the Komets on July 1, 2014.

On October 29, 2014, he signed with the Brampton Beast. He played one season with the team before being traded to the Wheeling Nailers on December 2, 2015, in exchange for future considerations. After finishing the season leading all ECHL defensemen with 43 assists, 54 points, 21 power-play assists, 24 power-play points and 227 shots on goal he was named to the All-ECHL First Team and ECHL Defenseman of the Year.

After playing in the ECHL for three seasons, Maione moved overseas to play with HC '05 Banská Bystrica in Slovakia. Following the 2016–17 season, he then moved to Finland to play with KalPa in the Finnish Liiga. After one season, he joined Dinamo Riga in the Kontinental Hockey League (KHL). Maione enjoyed a successful debut in the KHL with Riga in the 2018–19 season. He was named to the All-Star Game and led all Dinamo defenseman in scoring with 46 points in 58 games.

On May 8, 2019, he signed an improved contract to continue in the KHL, agreeing to terms on a one-year deal with Chinese entrant, Kunlun Red Star. He only played 16 games for them however and then a brief stint in Dinamo Minsk before returning to Dinamo Riga where he also spent most of the following season before being transferred to EHC München of the DEL in Germany. He then spent the next season playing for HC Bolzano in Italy before returning to Germany to play the 2022-2023 season for Bietigheim Steelers of the DEL.

During the 2023-2024 season he played for the Swedish club AIK of Hockeyallsvenskan and then signed a two-year contract with Björklöven from Umeå of the same league.
