= Austin Fyten =

Canadian ice hockey player

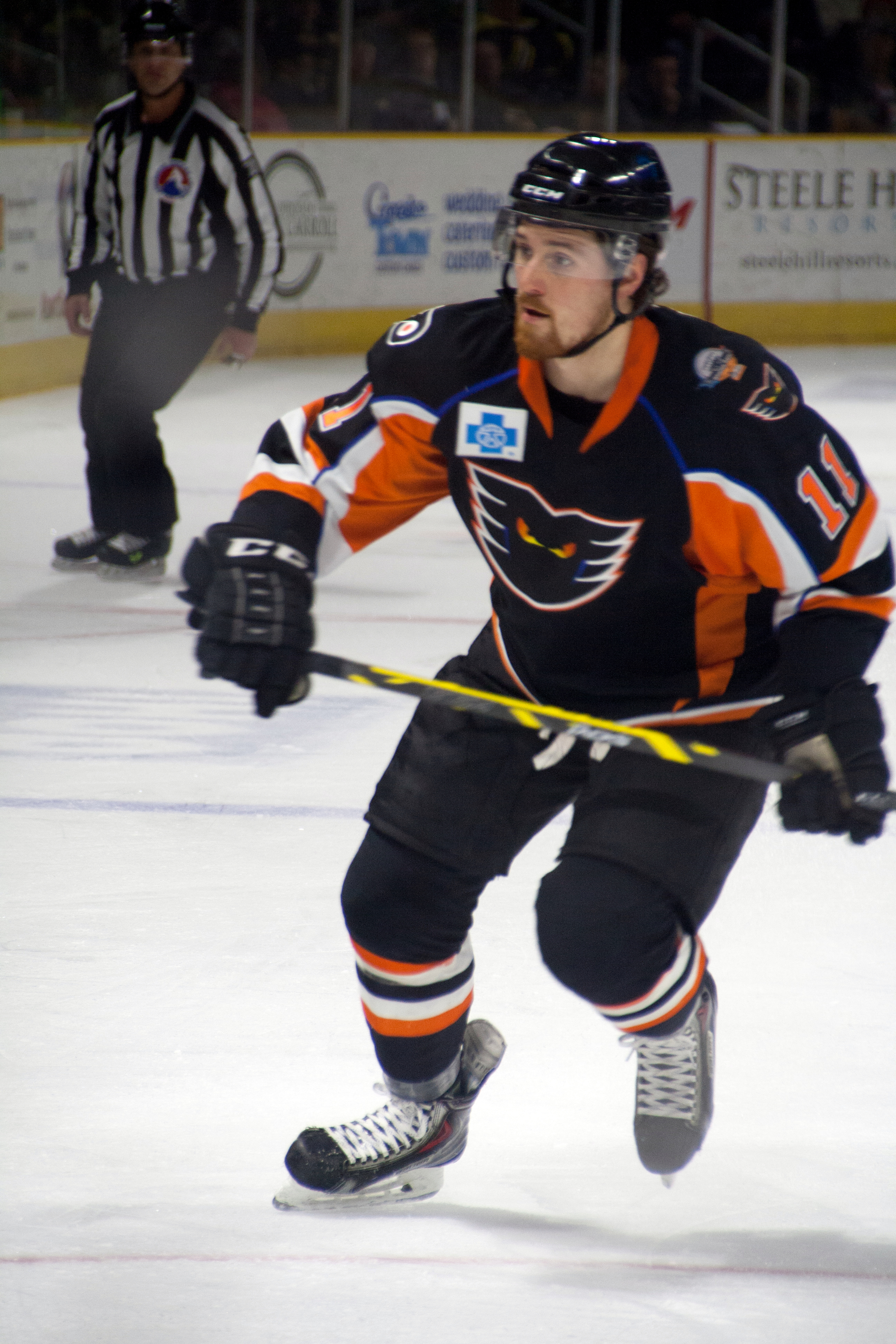
- Fyten with the Lehigh Valley Phantoms in 2015
- Born: May 3, 1991 (age 34) Sundre, Alberta, Canada
- Height: 6 ft 1 in (185 cm)
- Weight: 190 lb (86 kg; 13 st 8 lb)
- Position: Centre/Left wing
- Shoots: Left
- Magnus team Former teams: Boxers de Bordeaux; Texas Stars; Oklahoma City Barons; Lehigh Valley Phantoms; Hershey Bears; Providence Bruins; Belleville Senators; Eispiraten Crimmitschau
- NHL draft: Undrafted
- Playing career: 2012–present

Austin Fyten (born May 3, 1991) is a Canadian professional ice hockey forward who is currently playing for the Boxers de Bordeaux in the Ligue Magnus (FRA). He has formerly played in the American Hockey League (AHL).

== Playing career ==
Fyten first played in his native Alberta at the bantam and midget level with the Airdrie Xtreme and Ufa Bisons before he was selected in the second round, 27th overall in the 2006 WHL Bantam Draft by the Lethbridge Hurricanes.

Joining the Western Hockey League from the 2007–08 season, Fyten played in 193 games with the Lethbridge Hurricanes until 2011 scoring 55 goals and 122 points. Having suffered a knee injury in an exhibition game for the Hurricanes prior to the 2011–12 season, Fyten sat out the entire regular season to recover. He was picked up at the trade deadline by the Vancouver Giants and made his Giants debut in six playoff games, scoring two goals and five points.

As an Undrafted Free Agent, Fyten embarked on his professional career by signing an ECHL contract with the Idaho Steelheads to begin the 2012–13 season. Producing offensively at a near point-per-game pace, Fyten was loaned to American Hockey League affiliate, the Texas Stars on January 30, 2013. He appeared in 11 games for 2 assists before returning to the ECHL.

Fyten was signed to an AHL two-way contract with the Oklahoma City Barons for the following 2013–14 season, Fyten spent the majority of the season with the Barons, registering 20 points in 47 games. He split time in a second season with the Steelheads, featuring in 15 games for 15 points.

Showing the ability to make an impact in the AHL, Fyten secured a contract with the Lehigh Valley Phantoms, an affiliate to the Philadelphia Flyers, on August 20, 2014. In his first full season in the AHL in 2014–15, Fyten appeared in 64 games in a depth fourth-line role, contributing 11 points.

Familiarly as a free agent in the off-season, Fyten continued his growing journeyman role in the AHL, agreeing to a contract with the Hershey Bears on August 12, 2015. In the 2015–16 season, he spent the majority of his tenure within the Bears organization with ECHL affiliate, the South Carolina Stingrays. He posted 20 points in 41 games with the Stingrays, helping them advance to the Kelly Cup finals.

Fyten returned for a second stint with his original AHL club, the Texas Stars, on August 6, 2016. Fyten in a checking-line role, posted 12 points in 59 games in the 2016–17 season, earning a one-year extension with Texas on May 16, 2017. In the following 2017–18 season, Fyten as a versatile depth forward featured in his 200th career AHL game, and later helped the Stars advance to Calder Cup finals, posting 4 goals in 11 post-season games.

Having left Texas as a free agent in the off-season, Fyten extended his AHL career in joining the Providence Bruins on a one-year contract on August 21, 2018. In the 2018–19 season, Fyten made 45 appearances with Providence posting 9 points before he was traded to the Belleville Senators in exchange for Stuart Percy on March 4, 2019. Fyten made just 6 appearances with Belleville, notching 1 goal.

As a free agent, Fyten opted to pursue a European career, agreeing to a one-year deal with second-tier German club, Eispiraten Crimmitschau of the DEL2, on August 28, 2019. Relied upon offensively, Fyten added 43 points through 51 regular season games with ETC, before the 2019–20 season was cancelled due to the COVID-19 pandemic.

Returning to North America in the off-season, Fyten belatedly signed a contract with the Wheeling Nailers of the ECHL on January 18, 2021. In his lone season with the Nailers in 2020-21, Fyten contributed with 24 goals and 39 points in 49 regular season games.

As a free agent, Fyten opted to sign a one-year European deal with French club, Boxers de Bordeaux of the Ligue Magnus, on June 23, 2021.

== Personal ==
Fyten comes from a large hockey family, with three brothers, Andrew, Seth, and Tyler having played junior or coached while sister Caitlin played collegiate hockey with the University of Manitoba through 2018.

== Career statistics ==
			Regular season					Playoffs
Season	Team	League	GP	G	A	Pts	PIM	GP	G	A	Pts	PIM
2004–05	Airdrie Xtreme	AMBHL	37	19	20	39	28	4	2	3	5	6
2005–06	Airdrie Xtreme	AMBHL	34	23	23	46	62	4	3	5	8	8
2006–07	UFA Bisons	AMHL	27	2	10	12	34	8	2	2	4	18
2007–08	UFA Bisons	AMHL	36	13	23	36	72	6	2	5	7	10
2007–08	Lethbridge Hurricanes	WHL	6	0	0	0	0	10	1	2	3	4
2008–09	Lethbridge Hurricanes	WHL	67	12	13	25	70	10	1	1	2	12
2009–10	Lethbridge Hurricanes	WHL	68	19	24	43	114	—	—	—	—	—
2010–11	Lethbridge Hurricanes	WHL	52	24	30	54	103	—	—	—	—	—
2011–12	Vancouver Giants	WHL	—	—	—	—	—	6	2	3	5	13
2012–13	Idaho Steelheads	ECHL	46	14	27	41	55	17	5	6	11	10
2012–13	Texas Stars	AHL	11	0	2	2	4	—	—	—	—	—
2013–14	Oklahoma City Barons	AHL	47	7	13	20	31	3	1	1	2	0
2013–14	Idaho Steelheads	ECHL	15	9	6	15	37	—	—	—	—	—
2014–15	Lehigh Valley Phantoms	AHL	64	2	9	11	85	—	—	—	—	—
2015–16	South Carolina Stingrays	ECHL	41	9	11	20	88	19	8	11	19	28
2015–16	Hershey Bears	AHL	6	0	1	1	2	—	—	—	—	—
2016–17	Texas Stars	AHL	59	6	6	12	79	—	—	—	—	—
2017–18	Texas Stars	AHL	42	5	5	10	51	11	4	0	4	0
2017–18	Idaho Steelheads	ECHL	5	0	1	1	14	—	—	—	—	—
2018–19	Providence Bruins	AHL	45	3	6	9	55	—	—	—	—	—
2018–19	Belleville Senators	AHL	6	1	0	1	0	—	—	—	—	—
2019–20	Eispiraten Crimmitschau	DEL2	51	19	24	43	50	—	—	—	—	—
2020–21	Wheeling Nailers	ECHL	49	24	15	39	81	—	—	—	—	—
2021–22	Boxers de Bordeaux	France	7	1	4	5	4	—	—	—	—	—
AHL totals			280	24	42	66	307	14	5	1	6	0

== Awards and honours ==
Award	Year
AMBHL
Most Sportsmanlike Player	2006
