= Chad Costello =

American ice hockey player (born 1986)

- Born: July 22, 1986 (age 40) Johnston, Iowa, U.S.
- Height: 5 ft 9 in (175 cm)
- Weight: 170 lb (77 kg; 12 st 2 lb)
- Position: Right wing
- Shot: Right
- Played for: Lake Erie Monsters; Springfield Falcons; Worcester Sharks; Bridgeport Sound Tigers; Iserlohn Roosters; Krefeld Pinguine; Stavanger Oilers
- NHL draft: Undrafted
- Playing career: 2008–2022

Chad Costello (born July 22, 1986) is an American professional ice hockey player and coach. He is the former head coach of the Allen Americans in the ECHL.

== Playing career ==
Costello played junior hockey with the Cedar Rapids RoughRiders where he scored 76 points to be the leading scoring in the United States Hockey League for the 2005–06 season. He then attended Northeastern University where he played NCAA Division I college hockey with the Northeastern Huskies men's ice hockey team where he scored 14 goals and 21 assists for 35 points in 59 games.

In 2008–09, Costello played 65 games with the Muskegon Lumberjacks of the International Hockey League. In the following season, Costello signed with the Tulsa Oilers of the Central Hockey League. In leading the Oilers in scoring and finishing ninth in the CHL league scoring, Costello was loaned to their affiliate and made his AHL debut with the Lake Erie Monsters.

Costello was signed to a one-year contract, alongside Oilers linemate Jack Combs, by the Colorado Eagles of the ECHL on August 18, 2011, for the 2011–12 season. Costello was leading the Eagles and the ECHL in scoring with 76 points in 47 games before he suffered a season-ending knee injury on March 10, 2012. Despite his injury, Costello finished fourth in league scoring and was selected to the First All-Star Team and chosen as the ECHL's Most Valuable Player.

Costello returned to the Eagles the following season and repeated his success scoring 49 points in 27 games. His offensive partnership with Combs was signified when they were both signed to try-out contracts with the Bridgeport Sound Tigers on December 18, 2012. With the conclusion of the NHL lockout inducing significant roster movement, Costello was signed again alongside Combs, to an AHL deal with the Sound Tigers for the remainder of the season on January 9, 2013. In 21 games for the Sound Tigers, Costello produced 12 points, but was unable to find a constant role on the team. He was subsequently released from his AHL contract with the Sound Tigers and rejoined the Colorado Eagles on March 9, 2013.

On August 13, 2013, Costello returned to the CHL as a free agent, signing a one-year contract for the inaugural season of the St. Charles Chill. After only six games with the Chill, Costello was placed on waivers and claimed by the Arizona Sundogs. Costello opted not to report and signed a contract to the ECHL with the Ontario Reign on November 17, 2013.

By the end of 2014, Costello signed with the Allen Americans. He was the ECHL's top scorer with 125 points in 72 games, and went all the way to the Kelly Cup title, scoring two goals and an assist in the decisive game against the South Carolina Stingrays. He renewed with Allen for the following season, being named co-captain with Gary Steffes. Costello again led the league scoring in the 2015–16 season with 103 points, 24 goals and 79 assists.

On May 21, 2017, he signed a try-out contract with the German team Iserlohn Roosters from the Deutsche Eishockey Liga (DEL), rejoining friend and former linemate, Jack Combs. In departing the Americans, Costello left as Allen's franchise leader in goals, assists and points. He left the ECHL after leading the league in scoring for three straight seasons and back-to-back MVPs. In the 2017–18 season, Costello adapted quickly to the European ice posting 27 points in 37 games with the Roosters.

On March 23, 2018, with the conclusion of his contract with Iserlohn, Costello signed as a free agent continuing in the DEL on a one-year deal with Krefeld Pinguine. Following two seasons with the Pinguine, Costello continued his European career by playing on a shortened contract with Norwegian club, Stavanger Oilers of the Eliteserien.

Enjoying four seasons abroad, Costello opted to return to North America for the 2021–22 season, in agreeing to re-join former club, the Allen Americans of the ECHL on September 30, 2021.

On May 18, 2022, Costello announced his retirement from pro hockey, and was announced as the head coach of the Allen Americans

== Career statistics ==
			Regular season					Playoffs
Season	Team	League	GP	G	A	Pts	PIM	GP	G	A	Pts	PIM
2003–04	Des Moines Buccaneers	USHL	49	5	10	15	16	2	0	0	0	2
2004–05	Wichita Falls Wildcats	NAHL	56	29	34	63	32	3	5	1	6	0
2005–06	Cedar Rapids RoughRiders	USHL	59	31	45	76	15	8	3	3	6	2
2006–07	Northeastern University	HE	32	11	11	22	20	—	—	—	—	—
2007–08	Northeastern University	HE	27	3	10	13	12	—	—	—	—	—
2007–08	Texas Wildcatters	ECHL	2	0	0	0	0	—	—	—	—	—
2008–09	Muskegon Lumberjacks	IHL	65	17	29	46	20	—	—	—	—	—
2009–10	Corpus Christi IceRays	CHL	57	13	42	55	33	—	—	—	—	—
2010–11	Tulsa Oilers	CHL	54	34	50	84	17	10	5	14	19	0
2010–11	Lake Erie Monsters	AHL	8	0	1	1	2	—	—	—	—	—
2011–12	Colorado Eagles	ECHL	47	29	47	76	26	—	—	—	—	—
2011–12	Springfield Falcons	AHL	4	0	0	0	2	—	—	—	—	—
2011–12	Worcester Sharks	AHL	7	0	4	4	2	—	—	—	—	—
2012–13	Colorado Eagles	ECHL	36	17	41	58	30	6	3	4	7	2
2012–13	Bridgeport Sound Tigers	AHL	21	3	9	12	4	—	—	—	—	—
2013–14	St. Charles Chill	CHL	6	4	5	9	12	—	—	—	—	—
2013–14	Ontario Reign	ECHL	8	2	3	5	6	—	—	—	—	—
2014–15	Allen Americans	ECHL	72	41	84	125	36	25	9	19	28	12
2015–16	Allen Americans	ECHL	72	24	79	103	36	24	7	29	36	4
2016–17	Allen Americans	ECHL	72	33	89	122	42	11	3	9	12	6
2017–18	Iserlohn Roosters	DEL	37	8	19	27	6	1	0	0	0	0
2018–19	Krefeld Pinguine	DEL	52	17	35	52	20	—	—	—	—	—
2019–20	Krefeld Pinguine	DEL	52	20	34	54	28	—	—	—	—	—
2020–21	Stavanger Oilers	Norway	11	5	9	14	6	—	—	—	—	—
2021–22	Allen Americans	ECHL	66	26	46	72	4	5	2	2	4	0
2022	Team Trottier	3ICE	16	15	14	29	—	—	—	—	—	—
2023	Team Johnston	3ICE	6	3	3	6	—	—	—	—	—	—
AHL totals			40	3	14	17	10	—	—	—	—	—

== Awards and honours ==
Award	Year
USHL
Most Points (76)	2005–06
College
All-HE Rookie Team	2006–07
ECHL
First All-Star Team	2011–12, 2014–15, 2015–16, 2016–17
MVP	2011–12, 2015–16, 2016–17
Kelly Cup	2014–15, 2015–16
Top Scorer	2014–15, 2015–16, 2016–17
Kelly Cup MVP	2015–16
3ICE
Patrick Cup Champion	2022
Bryan Trottier League MVP Award	2022
