= Jarrett Burton =

Canadian ice hockey player (born 1990)

- Born: December 30, 1990 (age 35) Echo Bay, Ontario, Canada
- Height: 6 ft 0 in (183 cm)
- Weight: 187 lb (85 kg; 13 st 5 lb)
- Position: Centre
- Shot: Left
- Played for: WBS Penguins; Rochester Americans; Iowa Wild; Stavanger Oilers
- NHL draft: Undrafted
- Playing career: 2014–2022

Jarrett Burton (born December 30, 1990) is a Canadian former professional ice hockey centre.

== Playing career ==
Undrafted, Burton played minor junior hockey with the Kingston Voyageurs in the Ontario Junior Hockey League, before pursuing an American collegiate career with Clarkson University.

Following his senior year with the Golden Knights, Burton made his professional debut with the Wheeling Nailers in the ECHL to end the 2013–14 season.

Burton played five seasons in the AHL with the Wilkes-Barre/Scranton Penguins and the Rochester Americans before signing a one-year contract as a free agent with the Iowa Wild, primary affiliate to the Minnesota Wild on August 3, 2020.

Following the 2020–21 season with the Iowa Wild, having made 253 career appearances, Burton left the AHL to sign a one-year European contract with Norwegian based Stavanger Oilers of the Fjordkraftligaen on July 7, 2021.

== Career statistics ==
			Regular season					Playoffs
Season	Team	League	GP	G	A	Pts	PIM	GP	G	A	Pts	PIM
2006–07	Soo Thunderbirds	NOJHL	3	1	0	1	2	—	—	—	—	—
2007–08	Blind River Beavers	NOJHL	48	23	29	52	46	4	0	1	1	2
2008–09	Kingston Voyageurs	OJHL	48	25	20	45	42	23	6	11	17	30
2009–10	Kingston Voyageurs	OJHL	55	20	46	66	26	17	8	9	17	16
2010–11	Clarkson University	ECAC	30	3	5	8	10	—	—	—	—	—
2011–12	Clarkson University	ECAC	34	2	4	6	16	—	—	—	—	—
2012–13	Clarkson University	ECAC	35	12	8	20	45	—	—	—	—	—
2013–14	Clarkson University	ECAC	42	11	9	20	20	—	—	—	—	—
2013–14	Texas Stars	AHL	6	0	1	1	23	—	—	—	—	—
2013–14	Wheeling Nailers	ECHL	2	0	0	0	0	—	—	—	—	—
2014–15	Wheeling Nailers	ECHL	52	12	16	28	36	7	0	3	3	0
2015–16	Wheeling Nailers	ECHL	44	15	23	38	27	21	7	7	14	8
2015–16	Wilkes-Barre/Scranton Penguins	AHL	23	2	0	2	10	—	—	—	—	—
2016–17	Wilkes-Barre/Scranton Penguins	AHL	39	7	4	11	39	5	0	0	0	6
2016–17	Wheeling Nailers	ECHL	15	4	7	11	8	—	—	—	—	—
2017–18	Wilkes-Barre/Scranton Penguins	AHL	52	9	10	19	25	2	0	0	0	2
2017–18	Wheeling Nailers	ECHL	5	2	1	3	2	—	—	—	—	—
2018–19	Wilkes-Barre/Scranton Penguins	AHL	66	6	15	21	51	—	—	—	—	—
2019–20	Rochester Americans	AHL	39	1	1	2	23	—	—	—	—	—
2020–21	Iowa Wild	AHL	34	4	5	9	18	—	—	—	—	—
AHL totals			253	29	35	64	166	7	0	0	0	8
