= Gary Steffes =

American ice hockey player (born 1987)

- Born: May 20, 1987 (age 39) Grand Blanc, Michigan, U.S.
- Height: 6 ft 1 in (185 cm)
- Weight: 185 lb (84 kg; 13 st 3 lb)
- Position: Centre
- Shoots: Right
- ECHL team Former teams: Allen Americans; Lake Erie Monsters; Milwaukee Admirals; San Jose Barracuda
- NHL draft: Undrafted
- Playing career: 2010–present

Gary Steffes (born May 20, 1987) is an American former professional ice hockey player. He primarily played in the American Hockey League (AHL) and ECHL.

== Playing career ==
Steffes played for Team USA at the 2005 IIHF World U18 Championships held in the Czech Republic. Following four years of NCAA college hockey play with the Miami RedHawks men's ice hockey team, Steffes turned professional with the Tulsa Oilers of the Central Hockey League. He was rewarded for his outstanding play during his rookie season when he was named to the 2010–11 CHL All-Rookie Team.

Before the 2012–13 season, Steffes received an invitation to attend the AHL's Oklahoma City Barons training camp. Although he was not offered a contract by the Barons, he remained in his third season with the Tulsa Oilers. On January 8, 2013, he was loaned to the Lake Erie Monsters on a professional try-out deal. During his stint with the Monsters, he played 16 games, scoring one goal and tallying two points, before being sent back to Tulsa to finish the season.

On July 24, 2013, Steffes joined the Bakersfield Condors of the ECHL on a one-year deal as a free agent. During the 2013–14 season, he played the entire year with the team, recording 18 goals and totaling 35 points across 60 games.

During the off-season, Steffes chose to return to the CHL, signing a one-year deal with the Allen Americans on August 15, 2014. However, before the season began, the team transitioned to the ECHL. Steffes remained with the Americans for the rest of his career, retiring in 2020.

== Career statistics ==
| | | | Regular season | | | | | Playoffs |
| Season | Team | League | GP | G | A | Pts | PIM | GP | G | A | Pts | PIM |
|---|---|---|---|---|---|---|---|---|---|---|---|---|
| 2003–04 | Stratford Cullitons | MWJHL | 28 | 5 | 13 | 18 | 14 | 13 | 4 | 0 | 4 | 19 |
| 2004–05 | Stratford Cullitons | MWJHL | 6 | 6 | 2 | 8 | 10 | — | — | — | — | — |
| 2004-05 | Cedar Rapids RoughRiders | USHL | 42 | 1 | 9 | 10 | 60 | 10 | 3 | 0 | 3 | 12 |
| 2005–06 | Cedar Rapids RoughRiders | USHL | 56 | 11 | 11 | 22 | 77 | 8 | 6 | 1 | 7 | 12 |
| 2006–07 | Miami RedHawks | CCHA | 42 | 5 | 3 | 8 | 44 | — | — | — | — | — |
| 2007–08 | Miami RedHawks | CCHA | 36 | 6 | 10 | 16 | 34 | — | — | — | — | — |
| 2008–09 | Miami RedHawks | CCHA | 41 | 11 | 12 | 23 | 34 | — | — | — | — | — |
| 2009–10 | Miami RedHawks | CCHA | 17 | 0 | 1 | 1 | 8 | — | — | — | — | — |
| 2010–11 | Tulsa Oilers | CHL | 66 | 19 | 24 | 43 | 59 | 10 | 1 | 2 | 3 | 6 |
| 2011–12 | Tulsa Oilers | CHL | 66 | 22 | 30 | 52 | 63 | — | — | — | — | — |
| 2012–13 | Tulsa Oilers | CHL | 37 | 20 | 14 | 34 | 56 | — | — | — | — | — |
| 2012–13 | Lake Erie Monsters | AHL | 16 | 1 | 2 | 3 | 11 | — | — | — | — | — |
| 2013–14 | Bakersfield Condors | ECHL | 60 | 18 | 17 | 35 | 71 | 16 | 3 | 6 | 9 | 12 |
| 2014–15 | Allen Americans | ECHL | 63 | 44 | 29 | 73 | 59 | 25 | 13 | 5 | 18 | 12 |
| 2014–15 | Milwaukee Admirals | AHL | 9 | 4 | 0 | 4 | 0 | — | — | — | — | — |
| 2015–16 | Allen Americans | ECHL | 69 | 22 | 23 | 45 | 56 | 24 | 13 | 5 | 18 | 27 |
| 2015–16 | San Jose Barracuda | AHL | 2 | 0 | 1 | 1 | 2 | — | — | — | — | — |
| 2016–17 | Allen Americans | ECHL | 68 | 21 | 26 | 47 | 43 | 9 | 3 | 3 | 6 | 4 |
| 2017–18 | Allen Americans | ECHL | 6 | 4 | 2 | 6 | 4 | — | — | — | — | — |
| 2018–19 | Allen Americans | ECHL | 20 | 6 | 6 | 12 | 20 | — | — | — | — | — |
| 2019–20 | Allen Americans | ECHL | 2 | 0 | 0 | 0 | 6 | — | — | — | — | — |
| ECHL totals | | | 288 | 115 | 103 | 218 | 259 | 74 | 32 | 19 | 51 | 55 |
| CHL totals | | | 169 | 61 | 68 | 129 | 178 | 10 | 1 | 2 | 3 | 6 |
| AHL totals | | | 27 | 5 | 3 | 8 | 13 | — | — | — | — | — |

== Awards and honors ==
| Award | Year |
|---|---|
USHL
| Clark Cup | 2007 |
CHL
| All-Rookie Team | 2011 |
ECHL
| Kelly Cup | 2015, 2016 |
