= Mathieu Brodeur =

Canadian ice hockey player (born 1990)

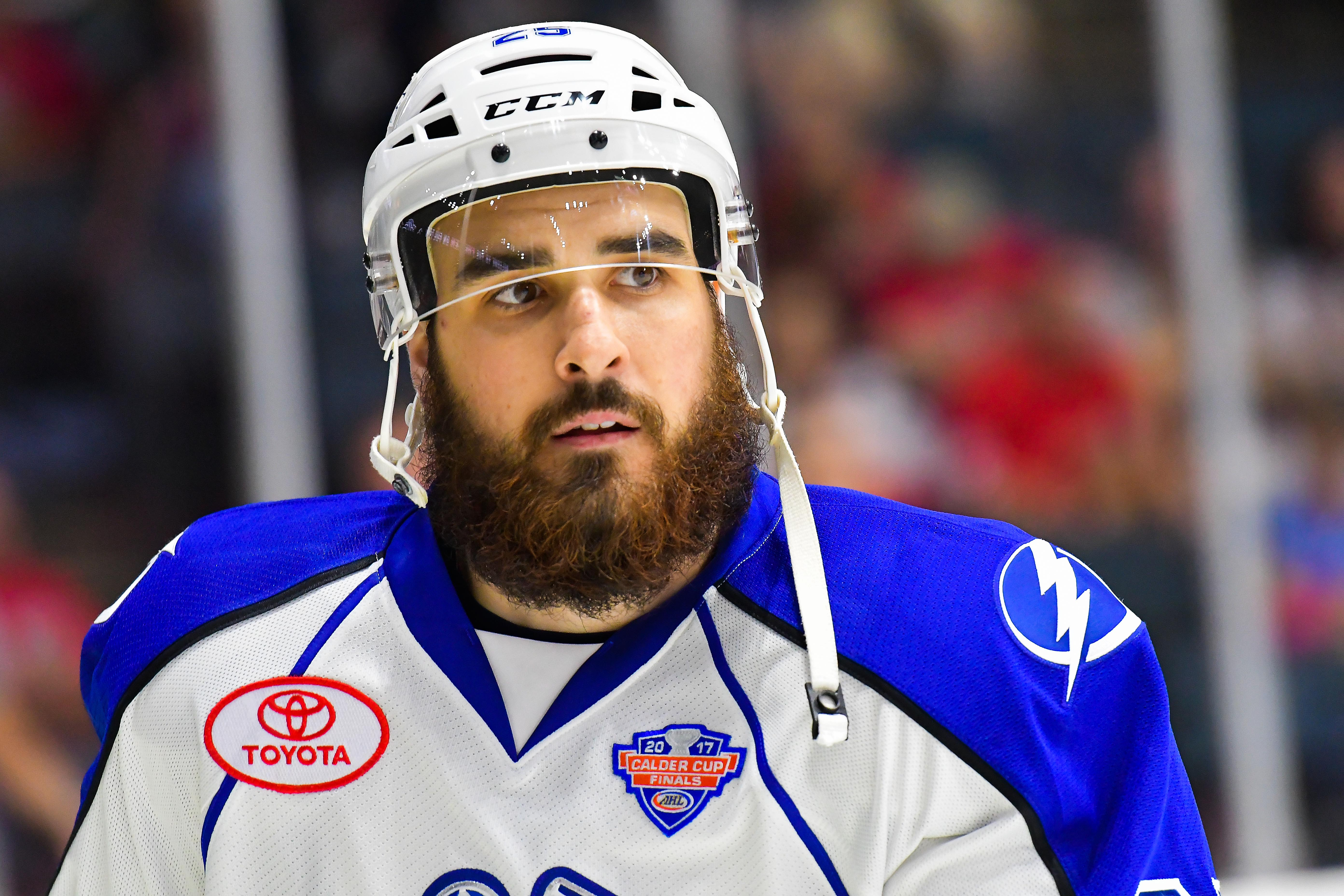
- Brodeur with the Syracuse Crunch in 2017
- Born: June 21, 1990 (age 36) Saint-Eustache, Quebec, Canada
- Height: 6 ft 5 in (196 cm)
- Weight: 192 lb (87 kg; 13 st 10 lb)
- Position: Defence
- Shot: Left
- Played for: San Antonio Rampage; Portland Pirates; Chicago Wolves; Albany Devils; Syracuse Crunch; Springfield Thunderbirds; Utica Comets; Dragons de Rouen; HK Dukla Trenčín
- NHL draft: 76th overall, 2008; Phoenix Coyotes
- Playing career: 2010–2023

Mathieu Brodeur (born June 21, 1990) is a Canadian former professional ice hockey defenceman. He was selected by the Phoenix Coyotes in the 3rd round (76th overall) of the 2008 NHL entry draft.

== Playing career ==
Prior to turning professional, Brodeur played major junior hockey in the Quebec Major Junior Hockey League with the Cape Breton Screaming Eagles. On April 2, 2010, Brodeur was signed by the Phoenix Coyotes to an entry-level contract.

Brodeur made his professional debut with the San Antonio Rampage, Phoenix's AHL affiliate at the time. Brodeur spent his last three years within the Coyotes organization with the Portland Pirates, before leaving as a free agent to sign a one-year deal with his third AHL team, the Chicago Wolves, on July 30, 2014.

Brodeur began the 2017–18 season in the AHL with the Springfield Thunderbirds, after signing a professional try-out contract on October 3, 2017. After 7 games he returned to the Thunder where he played in 48 games for 29 points throughout the season, while enduring two more AHL stints with the Crunch and Utica Comets.

As a free agent, Brodeur left for France, agreeing to a one-year deal with Dragons de Rouen of the Ligue Magnus on July 19, 2018.

After parts of two seasons abroad, Brodeur returned to the ECHL for the 2020–21 season, agreeing a contract with former club the Adirondack Thunder on August 27, 2020. With the Thunder opting to commence a hiatus due to the ongoing COVID-19 pandemic, Brodeur was immediately released as a free agent and later signed a contract to continue in the ECHL with the Fort Wayne Komets on December 8, 2020. In adding a veteran presence to the blueline, Brodeur added 4 goals and 10 points in 48 regular season games. In the post-season he appeared in 13 playoff contests helping Fort Wayne capture their first Kelly Cup in a championship victory over the South Carolina Stingrays.

As a free agent, Brodeur continued in the ECHL, joining hometown provincial club Trois-Rivières Lions, for their inaugural season in 2021–22 season on July 9, 2021.

After a game against the Reading Royals on January 25, 2022, Brodeur announced his retirement from professional hockey.

== Career statistics ==
			Regular season					Playoffs
Season	Team	League	GP	G	A	Pts	PIM	GP	G	A	Pts	PIM
2007–08	Cape Breton Screaming Eagles	QMJHL	69	1	6	7	27	11	0	0	0	6
2008–09	Cape Breton Screaming Eagles	QMJHL	61	3	12	15	15	11	1	3	4	4
2009–10	Cape Breton Screaming Eagles	QMJHL	69	4	25	29	31	5	0	0	0	9
2009–10	San Antonio Rampage	AHL	2	0	1	1	0	—	—	—	—	—
2010–11	San Antonio Rampage	AHL	4	0	0	0	2	—	—	—	—	—
2010–11	Las Vegas Wranglers	ECHL	52	0	1	1	43	—	—	—	—	—
2011–12	Portland Pirates	AHL	43	2	4	6	29	—	—	—	—	—
2012–13	Portland Pirates	AHL	65	3	16	19	47	3	0	0	0	2
2013–14	Portland Pirates	AHL	62	3	9	12	49	—	—	—	—	—
2014–15	Chicago Wolves	AHL	69	4	11	15	33	3	1	0	1	2
2015–16	Adirondack Thunder	ECHL	70	9	21	30	42	12	2	1	3	18
2015–16	Albany Devils	AHL	2	0	0	0	0	—	—	—	—	—
2016–17	Adirondack Thunder	ECHL	15	4	15	19	4	—	—	—	—	—
2016–17	Syracuse Crunch	AHL	56	3	10	13	57	22	1	3	4	8
2017–18	Springfield Thunderbirds	AHL	7	0	1	1	17	—	—	—	—	—
2017–18	Adirondack Thunder	ECHL	48	4	25	29	17	17	2	5	7	6
2017–18	Syracuse Crunch	AHL	4	0	0	0	4	—	—	—	—	—
2017–18	Utica Comets	AHL	4	0	1	1	2	—	—	—	—	—
2018–19	Dragons de Rouen	FRA	44	2	13	15	24	16	3	4	7	12
2019–20	Jonquière Marquis	LNAH	24	2	4	6	10	—	—	—	—	—
2019–20	HK Dukla Trenčín	Slovak	16	3	2	5	6	—	—	—	—	—
2020–21	Fort Wayne Komets	ECHL	48	4	6	10	19	13	1	0	1	6
2021–22	Trois-Rivières Lions	ECHL	69	5	14	19	47	7	0	2	2	6
2022–23	Trois-Rivières Lions	ECHL	38	2	3	5	10	—	—	—	—	—
AHL totals			318	15	53	68	240	28	2	3	5	12

== Awards and honours ==
Award	Year
ECHL
Kelly Cup (Fort Wayne Komets)	2021
