= 2005–06 USHL season =

2005-06 USHL season
- League: United States Hockey League
- Sport: Ice hockey
- Duration: September 23, 2005 – May 1, 2006
- Games: 60
- Teams: 11

Anderson Cup Champions
- Season champions: Sioux Falls Stampede

Clark Cup Champions
- Champions: Des Moines Buccaneers

USHL seasons
- 2004–05 2006–07

The 2005–06 season was the 27th season of the United States Hockey League as an all-junior league. The regular season began on September 23, 2005, and concluded on March 1, 2006, with the regular season champion winning the Anderson Cup.

The Clark Cup playoffs featured the top four teams from each division competing for the league title.

== Regular season ==
Final standings
Note: GP = Games played; W = Wins; L = Losses; OTL = Overtime losses; SL = Shootout losses; GF = Goals for; GA = Goals against; PTS = Points; x = clinched playoff berth; y = clinched division title; z = clinched league title

=== East Division ===
Team	GP	W	L	OTL	PTS	GF	GA
yCedar Rapids RoughRiders	60	33	21	6	72	196	170
xDes Moines Buccaneers	60	33	21	6	72	208	173
xGreen Bay Gamblers	60	30	26	4	64	182	183
xIndiana Ice	60	25	29	6	56	186	224
Waterloo Black Hawks	60	23	30	7	53	177	201
Chicago Steel	60	18	36	6	42	163	243

=== West Division ===
Team	GP	W	L	OTL	PTS	GF	GA
zSioux Falls Stampede	60	43	13	4	90	190	135
xLincoln Stars	60	34	20	6	74	218	178
xOmaha Lancers	60	35	21	4	74	189	176
xTri-City Storm	60	28	23	9	65	166	158
Sioux City Musketeers	60	28	26	6	62	182	216

== Clark Cup playoffs ==
Quarter-finals
1	Cedar Rapids	3	5	2	3	6
4	Indiana Ice	4	2	7	2	2
East Division
2	Des Moines	4	6	3	–	–
3	Green Bay	1	0	2	–	–
1	Sioux Falls	3	1	2	2	2
4	Tri-City Storm	1	3	5	0	0
West Division
2	Lincoln	5	5	1	2	1
3	Omaha	1	2	3	4	0

Semi-finals
1	Cedar Rapids	2	1	3	–	–
2	Des Moines	3	3	5	–	–
1	Sioux Falls	5	5	5	4	–
3	Lincoln	5	3	1	3	–

Clark Cup Championship
E	Des Moines	2	2	3	1	3
W	Sioux Falls	0	5	2	2	2

== Players ==
=== Scoring leaders ===
	Player	Team	GP	G	A	Pts	+/-	PIM
1	Chad Costello	Cedar Rapids RoughRiders	59	31	45	76	+2	15
2	Trevor Lewis	Des Moines Buccaneers	56	35	40	75	+25	69
3	Mike Davies	Lincoln Stars	51	28	43	71	+9	48
	Teddy Purcell	Cedar Rapids RoughRiders	55	19	52	71	+3	14
5	Andreas Nödl	Sioux Falls Stampede	58	29	30	59	+13	16
6	Kyle Okposo	Des Moines Buccaneers	50	27	31	58	+28	56
7	Eli Vlaisavljevich	Lincoln Stars	58	16	41	57	+6	42
8	Matt Schepke	Omaha Lancers	60	37	19	56	+12	98
	Sean Backman	Green Bay Gamblers	57	29	27	56	+24	30
	Colin Vock	Des Moines Buccaneers	57	25	31	56	+8	66

=== Leading goaltenders ===
	Player	Team	GP	MIN	W	L	OTL	SO	GA	GAA	SV	SV%
1	Aaron Rock	Tri-City Storm	48	2722	24	14	7	7	95	2.09	907	.905
2	John Murray	Sioux Falls Stampede	32	1908	23	7	1	3	68	2.14	898	.930
3	Alex Kangas	Sioux Falls Stampede	29	1733	20	6	3	3	62	2.15	819	.930
4	Michael Spillane	Omaha Lancers	43	2479	27	10	3	4	95	2.30	1058	.918
5	Bryan Hogan	Lincoln Stars	39	2277	22	12	4	1	95	2.50	1039	.916

== Awards ==
- Coach of the Year: Kevin Hartzell Sioux Falls Stampede
- Curt Hammer Award: Trevor Lewis Des Moines Buccaneers
- Defenseman of the Year: Nick Schaus Omaha Lancers
- Forward of the Year: Trevor Lewis Des Moines Buccaneers
- General Manager of the Year: Regg Simon Des Moines Buccaneers
- Goaltender of the Year: Alex Stalock Cedar Rapids RoughRiders
- Organization of the Year: Sioux Falls Stampede
- Player of the Year: Trevor Lewis Des Moines Buccaneers
- Rookie of the Year: Kyle Okposo Des Moines Buccaneers
