= 2015–16 Missouri Mavericks season =

2015–16 Missouri Mavericks
- Division: 1st Central
- Conference: 1st Western
- 2015–16 record: 52-15-3-2
- Home record: 29-6-0-1
- Road record: 23-9-3-1
- Goals for: 234
- Goals against: 162

Team information
- General manager: Brent Thiessen
- Coach: Richard Matvichuk
- Assistant coach: Simon Watson
- Alternate captains: Patrick Cullity; Rocco Carzo; Andrew Courtney
- Arena: Silverstein Eye Centers Arena

Team leaders
- Goals: Jesse Root (26)
- Assists: Rocco Carzo (41)
- Points: Tyler Barnes (61)
- Penalty minutes: C.J. Ludwig (95)
- Plus/minus: Jesse Root (34)
- Wins: Josh Robinson (28)
- Goals against average: Josh Robinson (1.88)

The 2015–16 Missouri Mavericks season is the 7th season of the ECHL franchise in Independence, Missouri, a suburb of Kansas City, Missouri.

== Marquee events during the season ==
On June 11, 2015, the Missouri Mavericks announced an affiliation agreement with the New York Islanders of the National Hockey League and the Bridgeport Sound Tigers of the American Hockey League, which is also an affiliate of the Islanders.

On September 10, 2015, it was announced that former Mavericks player John-Scott Dickson had been hired as an Assistant Coach for the Mavericks for the 2015-16 season, joining Head Coach Richard Matvichuk and fellow Assistant Coach Simon Watson.

On April 10, 2016, Ross Johnston, who played 18 games for the Mavericks during the 2015-16 season, became the first former Maverick to make his NHL debut after playing for the Mavericks, when he suited up for the New York Islanders in a game against the Philadelphia Flyers.

== Playoffs ==
On May 10, 2016 the Mavericks' 2015–16 season ended with a 5–1 loss to the Allen Americans at home in Game 6 of the Kelly Cup Playoffs Semifinals.

2016 ECHL Kelly Cup Playoffs

Kelly Cup Playoffs Opening Round vs. Quad City Mallards (Best-of-Seven Series) (Home: 2-0; Road: 2-0)
#	Date	Opponent	Score	OT	Decision	Series
1	April 16	Quad City Mallards	6-3		Josh Robinson	1-0
2	April 17	Quad City Mallards	2-1		Josh Robinson	2-0
3	April 20	@ Quad City Mallards	4-2		Josh Robinson	3-0
4	April 22	@ Quad City Mallards	4-1		Josh Robinson	4-0

Kelly Cup Playoffs Second Round vs. Allen Americans (Best-of-Seven Series) (Home: 1-2; Road: 1-2)
#	Date	Opponent	Score	OT	Decision	Series
1	April 29	Allen Americans	2-0		Riley Gill	0-1
2	April 30	Allen Americans	5-2		Parker Milner	1-1
3	May 4	@ Allen Americans	5-1		Riley Gill	1-2
4	May 6	@ Allen Americans	4-2		Riley Gill	1-3
5	May 8	@ Allen Americans	3-1		Josh Robinson	2-3
6	May 10	Allen Americans	6-2		Riley Gill	2-4

== Transactions ==
=== Player signings and acquisitions off of waivers ===
Player	Former team	Date
Tanner Fritz	Ohio State University	June 24, 2015
Andrew Courtney	Re-Signed	June 24, 2015
Patch Alber	Re-Signed	July 1, 2015
Chris Owens	Re-Signed	July 1, 2015
Rocco Carzo	Ontario Reign	July 9, 2015
Tristan King	Ontario Reign	July 9, 2015
Josh Robinson	Re-Signed	July 13, 2015
David de Kastrozza	Idaho Steelheads	July 13, 2015
Danick Paquette	Utah Grizzlies	July 14, 2015
Dax Lauwers	Colorado Eagles	July 14, 2015
John Schiavo	Merritt Centennials	August 5, 2015
Liam Stewart	Quad City Mallards	August 5, 2015
Jason Missiaen	Greenville Road Warriors	September 23, 2015
Connor Jones	Bakersfield Condors	September 24, 2015
Kellen Jones	Bakersfield Condors	September 24, 2015
Patrick Cullity	Idaho Steelheads	August 19, 2015
Wes Cunningham	Dragons de Rouen	August 19, 2015
Scott Allen	Colorado Eagles	September 1, 2015
Andrew Johnston	Philadelphia Flyers	September 1, 2015
Taran Kozun	Adirondack Flames	
John Schiavo	Macon Mayhem	November 12, 2015
Mike Donnellan	Peoria Rivermen	November 12, 2015
Luke Sandler	Peoria Rivermen	November 12, 2015
Alex Lepkowski	Norfolk Admirals	November 13, 2015
Kyle Beach	Salzburg EC	November 24, 2015
Josh Trimberger	Allen Americans	December 26, 2016
Quinn Smith	Norfolk Admirals	January 11, 2016
Mike Donnellan	Peoria Rivermen	January 11, 2016
Garrett Ladd	Elmira Jackals	January 20, 2016
Dean Willmott	Mississippi RiverKings	January 18, 2016
Alex Taulien	Elmira College	March 6, 2016
Nolan Descoteaux	Allen Americans	March 6, 2016
Mike Donnellan	Peoria Rivermen	March 11, 2016
Darren Nowick	Northern Michigan University	March 16, 2016
Travis Walsh	Michigan State University	March 26, 2016
Michael Hill	St. Norbert College	March 30, 2016
Teddy Doherty	Boston College	April 9, 2016
Travis Walsh	Chicago Wolves	April 12, 2016
Tyler Parks	Adrian College	April 19, 2016

=== Free agency loses, player releases, and player retirements ===
Player	Free Agency Loss (New Team)/Waived (New Team)/Placed on Team Suspension (New Team)/Retired	Date
Sébastien Thinel	Free Agency (Brûleurs de Loups de Grenoble)	June 3, 2015
Geoff Walker	Free Agency (Löwen Frankfurt)	June 15, 2015
Troy Vance	Rejoined Parent Club (Dallas Stars) and then loaned to Ässät	June 17, 2015
Mike Clemente	Free Agent (Rungsted IK)	
Matt Stephenson	Retired	
Derik Johnson	Free Agent (Reading Royals)	July 30, 2015
Jared Brown	Free Agent (Ducs de Dijon)	August 3, 2015
Ludwig Karlsson	Free Agent (Orlando Solar Bears)	August 6, 2015
Andrew Darrigo	Free Agent (Wichita Thunder)	September 28, 2015
Brian Nugent	Free Agent (Tulsa Oilers)	September 30, 2015
Jason Missiaen	Released (STS Sanok)	October 2015
John Schiavo	Released (Macon Mayhem)	October 9, 2015
Dax Lauwers	Released (Cincinnati Cyclones)	October 14, 2015
Gabriel Lévesque	Free Agent (Laval Predators)	October 23, 2015
Luke Sandler	Released (Peoria Rivermen)	November 14, 2015
Mike Donnellan	Released (Peoria Rivermen)	November 14, 2015
Josh Trimberger	Released (Alaska Aces)	November 14, 2015
John Schiavo	Released (Macon Mayhem)	January 4, 2016
Chris Rawlings	Released	January 21, 2016
Quinn Smith	Released (Adirondack Thunder)	January 23, 2016
Mike Donnellan	Released (Peoria Rivermen)	January 26, 2016
Alex Taulien	Released (Quad City Mallards)	March 14, 2016
Travis Walsh	Released (Chicago Wolves)	April 1, 2016
Mike Donnellan	Released (Peoria Rivermen)	April 2, 2016
Michael Hill	Released (Knoxville Ice Bears)	April 5, 2016
Tanner Fritz	Bridgeport Sound Tigers	April 8, 2016
Nolan Descoteaux	Released (Allen Americans)	April 12, 2016
Tyler Parks	Released (Elmira Jackals)	April 30, 2016

=== "Future Considerations" Acquired as Part of Trades Made During The 2014-15 season ===
Player	Team From Which Rights Acquired	Date Acquired
Rights to David de Kastrozza	Idaho Steelheads	June 16, 2015
Rights to Rocco Carzo	Ontario Reign	June 16, 2015
Rights to Tristan King	Ontario Reign	June 16, 2015
Rights to David Pacan	Cincinnati Cyclones	June 16, 2015

=== Trades ===
July 1, 2015	To Norfolk Admirals: ECHL rights to Alex Lepkowski; ECHL rights to Kain Allicock	To Missouri: ECHL rights to Sébastien Sylvestre
August 6, 2015	To Orlando Solar Bears: ECHL rights to Lindsay Sparks; ECHL rights to Tyler Currier	To Missouri: ECHL rights to Bryce Aneloski
September 24, 2015	To South Carolina Stingrays: ECHL rights to Alex Lepkowski; ECHL rights to David Pacan	To Missouri: ECHL rights to Lee Moffie
October 8, 2015	To Alaska Aces: Liam Stewart	To Missouri: Unknown considerations
October 10, 2015	To Allen Americans: Tristan King	To Missouri: Trevor Ludwig
October 10, 2015	To South Carolina Stingrays: Andrew Johnston	To Missouri: Future Considerations
October 22, 2015	To Adirondack Thunder: Patch Alber	To Missouri: Unknown Considerations
October 27, 2015	To Manchester Monarchs: Danick Paquette	To Missouri: Unknown Considerations
November 10, 2015	To Utah Grizzlies: Taran Kozun	To Missouri: ECHL rights to T.J. Syner
November 10, 2015	To Norfolk Admirals: Scott Allen; ECHL rights to Connor Jones	To Missouri: ECHL rights to Alex Lepkowski
December 15, 2015	To Indy Fuel: ECHL rights to Darian Dziurzynski	To Missouri: Reed Seckel
December 18, 2015	To Utah Grizzlies: Future considerations	To Missouri: Torin Snydeman
December 29, 2015	To Idaho Steelheads: Torin Snydeman	To Missouri: Chris Rawlings; ECHL rights to Radoslav Illo
January 4, 2016	To Orlando Solar Bears: Future Considerations	To Missouri: Scott Wamsganz
January 19, 2016	To Manchester Monarchs: Future Considerations	To Missouri: Eric Neilson
January 20, 2016	To Rapid City Rush: ECHL rights to Zach Tolkinen	To Missouri: Zach Cohen
January 20, 2016	To Alaska Aces: Scott Wamsganz	To Missouri: Steven Summerhays
February 3, 2016	To Elmira Jackals: Zach Cohen	To Missouri: Zach Tolkinen
February 3, 2016	To Quad City Mallards: ECHL Rights to Kyle Beach	To Missouri: ECHL Rights to Parker Milner, who signed with the Missouri Mavericks' AHL affiliate, the Bridgeport Sound Tigers, on July 2, 2015 prior to the 2015-16 season.
February 5, 2016	To Norfolk Admirals: Wes Cunningham	To Missouri: Unknown considerations
February 19, 2016	To Adirondack Thunder: Dean Willmott	To Missouri: Future considerations
March 3, 2016	To Greenville Swamp Rabbits: ECHL rights to Kellen Jones	To Missouri: Darian Dziurzynski
March 10, 2016	To Brampton Beast: ECHL rights to Chris Owens	To Missouri: Scott Howes

=== Mavericks players invited to and released from NHL and AHL training camps ===
Player	Invited To/Released From	NHL/AHL Team	Date
Taran Kozun	Invited To	Washington Capitals	September 16, 2015
Scott Allen	Invited To	Bridgeport Sound Tigers	September 28, 2015
Patrick Cullity	Invited To	Bridgeport Sound Tigers	September 28, 2015
Tanner Fritz	Invited To	Bridgeport Sound Tigers	September 28, 2015
Andrew Johnston	Invited To	Bridgeport Sound Tigers	September 28, 2015
Connor Jones	Invited To	Bridgeport Sound Tigers	September 28, 2015
Kellen Jones	Invited To	Bridgeport Sound Tigers	September 28, 2015
Dax Lauwers	Invited To	Bridgeport Sound Tigers	September 28, 2015
Jason Missiaen	Invited To	Bridgeport Sound Tigers	September 28, 2015
Danick Paquette	Invited To	Bridgeport Sound Tigers	September 28, 2015
John Schiavo	Invited To	Bridgeport Sound Tigers	September 28, 2015
Scott Allen	Released From	Bridgeport Sound Tigers	October 2, 2015
Tanner Fritz	Released From	Bridgeport Sound Tigers	October 2, 2015
Andrew Johnston	Released From	Bridgeport Sound Tigers	October 2, 2015
Dax Lauwers	Released From	Bridgeport Sound Tigers	October 2, 2015
Danick Paquette	Released From	Bridgeport Sound Tigers	October 2, 2015
John Schiavo	Released From	Bridgeport Sound Tigers	October 2, 2015
Taran Kozun	Released From	Hershey Bears	October 3, 2015
Kellen Jones	Released From	Bridgeport Sound Tigers	October 8, 2015
Jason Missiaen	Released From	Bridgeport Sound Tigers	October 8, 2015

=== Transferred and loaned players/AHL Professional Try Out contract signings/terminations of Missouri Mavericks players ===
Player	To/From	Affiliate Team	Date
Kane Lafranchise	From	Bridgeport Sound Tigers	October 6, 2015
Bryce Aneloski	From	Bridgeport Sound Tigers	October 6, 2015
Patrick Cullity	To	Bridgeport Sound Tigers	October 8, 2015
Jesse Root	From	Bridgeport Sound Tigers	October 8, 2015
Tyler Barnes	From	Bridgeport Sound Tigers	October 8, 2015
Josh Holmstrom	From	Bridgeport Sound Tigers	October 8, 2015
Colin Markison	From	Bridgeport Sound Tigers	October 8, 2015
C.J. Ludwig	From	Bridgeport Sound Tigers	October 8, 2015
Kyle Burroughs	From	Bridgeport Sound Tigers	October 9, 2015
Parker Milner	To	Bridgeport Sound Tigers	October 9, 2015
Patrick Cullity	From	Bridgeport Sound Tigers	October 20, 2015
Loic Leduc	From	Bridgeport Sound Tigers	October 21, 2015
Carter Verhaeghe	From	Bridgeport Sound Tigers	October 21, 2015
Parker Milner	To	Bridgeport Sound Tigers	October 22, 2015
Loic Leduc	To	Bridgeport Sound Tigers	November 1, 2015
Carter Verhaeghe	To	Bridgeport Sound Tigers	November 1, 2015
Matt Finn	To	Bridgeport Sound Tigers	November 9, 2015
Carter Verhaeghe	From	Bridgeport Sound Tigers	November 24, 2015
Kellen Jones	To	Bakersfield Condors	November 23, 2015
Jesse Root	To	Bridgeport Sound Tigers	December 9, 2015
Josh Holmstrom	To	Bridgeport Sound Tigers	December 17, 2015
Loic Leduc	From	Bridgeport Sound Tigers	December 30, 2015
Kyle Burroughs	To	Bridgeport Sound Tigers	December 30, 2015
Patrick Cullity	To	Bridgeport Sound Tigers	January 4, 2016
Carter Verhaeghe	To	Bridgeport Sound Tigers	January 4, 2016
Colin Markison	To	Bridgeport Sound Tigers	January 4, 2016
Jesse Root	From	Bridgeport Sound Tigers	January 4, 2016
Josh Holmstrom	From	Bridgeport Sound Tigers	January 4, 2016
Matt Finn	From	Bridgeport Sound Tigers	January 4, 2016
Loic Leduc	From	Bridgeport Sound Tigers	January 6, 2016
Stephon Williams	From	Bridgeport Sound Tigers	January 8, 2016
Rocco Carzo	To	San Diego Gulls	January 15, 2016
Bryce Aneloski	To	Bridgeport Sound Tigers	January 19, 2016
Rocco Carzo	From	San Diego Gulls	January 22, 2016
Jesse Graham	From	Bridgeport Sound Tigers	January 25, 2016
Bryce Aneloski	From	Bridgeport Sound Tigers	January 27, 2016
Ross Johnston	From	Bridgeport Sound Tigers	February 5, 2016
Stephon Williams	To	Bridgeport Sound Tigers	February 10, 2016
Parker Milner	To	Bridgeport Sound Tigers	February 12, 2016
Kellen Jones	From	Bakersfield Condors	February 16, 2016
Josh Robinson	To	Springfield Falcons	February 17, 2016
Jesse Graham	From	Bridgeport Sound Tigers	February 17, 2016
C.J. Ludwig	To	Bridgeport Sound Tigers	February 25, 2016
Kane Lafranchise	To	Bridgeport Sound Tigers	January 25, 2016
Tanner Fritz	To	Bridgeport Sound Tigers	February 17, 2016
Patrick Cullity	From	Bridgeport Sound Tigers	February 19, 2016
C.J Ludwig	From	Bridgeport Sound Tigers	March 3, 2016
Kellen Jones	To	Utica Comets	March 3, 2016
Matt Finn	To	Bridgeport Sound Tigers	March 5, 2016
Josh Robinson	From	Springfield Falcons	March 14, 2016
Loic Leduc	From	Bridgeport Sound Tigers	March 18, 2016
Parker Milner	To	Bridgeport Sound Tigers	March 22, 2016
Parker Milner	From	Bridgeport Sound Tigers	March 25, 2016
Josh Robinson	To	Stockton Heat	March 29, 2016
Jesse Graham	From	Bridgeport Sound Tigers	April 4, 2016
Parker Milner	From	Bridgeport Sound Tigers	April 6, 2016
Josh Robinson	From	Stockton Heat	April 7, 2016
Tyler Barnes	To	Bridgeport Sound Tigers	April 9, 2016
Josh Holmstrom	To	Bridgeport Sound Tigers	April 9, 2016
Carter Verhaeghe	From	Bridgeport Sound Tigers	April 9, 2016
Parker Milner	To	Bridgeport Sound Tigers	April 12, 2016
Parker Milner	From	Bridgeport Sound Tigers	April 19, 2016
Kellen Jones	From	Utica Comets	April 29, 2016
Parker Milner	To	Bridgeport Sound Tigers	April 30, 2016
Patrick Cullity	From	Bridgeport Sound Tigers	April 30, 2016
Ross Johnston	From	Bridgeport Sound Tigers	April 30, 2016

=== Player suspensions or placed on leave ===
Player	Team Suspension (New Team, If Applicable)/League Suspension (Number of Games)/Granted Leave to Join National Team	Date Placed on Suspension/Granted Leave	Date Activated from Suspension/Returned from Leave
C.J. Ludwig	Suspension (1 game); Fine for undisclosed amount	November 28, 2015	
C.J. Ludwig	Suspended Indefinitely; Fine for undisclosed amount	March 10, 2016	
C.J. Ludwig	Suspension (6 games); Fine for undisclosed amount	March 25, 2016	

=== Injured reserve ===
Player	Date Placed on Injured Reserve	Date Activated from Injured Reserve
Wes Cunningham	Unknown	January 2, 2016

== Awards, records, and milestones ==
Player/Team	Award/Record	Date
Josh Robinson	Named CCM ECHL Goalie of The Week	October 20, 2015
Tyler Barnes	Named Sher-Wood Hockey Player of the Week	November 3, 2015
Josh Robinson	Named Warrior Hockey ECHL Goalie of The Month (October 2015)	November 4, 2015
Jesse Root	Named CCM ECHL Player of The Month (November 2015)	December 2, 2015
Josh Robinson	Named Warrior Hockey ECHL Goalie of The Month (December 2015)	November 4, 2015

== Roster ==
As of June 15, 2016

No.	Nat	Player	Pos	S/G	Age	Acquired	Birthplace	Contract
12	(United States)	Rocco Carzo (A)	F	L	36	2015	Media, Pennsylvania	Mavericks
27	(Canada)	Andrew Courtney (A)	F	R	41	2011	Belleville, Ontario	Mavericks
3	(United States)	Patrick Cullity	D	L	39	2015	Tewksbury, Massachusetts	Mavericks
13	(United States)	David de Kastrozza	RW	R	39	2015	Toms River, New Jersey	Mavericks
5	(United States)	Teddy Doherty	D	L	32	2016	Hopkinton, Massachusetts	Mavericks
13	(Canada)	Scott Howes	LW	L	38	2016	Toronto, Ontario	Mavericks
	(Slovakia)	Radoslav Illo	F	L	36	2016	Považská Bystrica, Slovakia	Mavericks
10	(United States)	Alex Lepkowski	D	L	33	2015	West Seneca, New York	Mavericks
14	(United States)	Trevor Ludwig (C)	D	L	41	2015	Colleyville, Texas	Mavericks
49	(United States)	Darren Nowick	F	R	33	2016	Long Beach, California	Mavericks
28	(Canada)	Eric Neilson (A)	RW	R	41	2016	Fredericton, New Brunswick	Mavericks
30	(United States)	Josh Robinson	G	R	36	2015	Frankenmuth, Michigan	Mavericks
70	(United States)	Reed Seckel	F	L	36	2015	Melvin, Michigan	Mavericks
	(United States)	T.J. Syner	F	L	37	2016	Springfield, Massachusetts	Mavericks
44	(United States)	Travis Walsh	D	R	33	2016	Lansing Michigan	Mavericks

== See also ==
- 2015–16 ECHL season
