= 2014–15 Missouri Mavericks season =

Hockey franchise season

2014–15 Missouri Mavericks
- Division: 6th Central
- Conference: 11th Western
- 2014–15 record: 28-35-5-4
- Home record: 14-18-1-3
- Road record: 14-17-4-1
- Goals for: 192
- Goals against: 231

Team information
- General manager: Brent Thiessen
- Coach: Richard Matvichuk
- Captain: Sébastien Thinel
- Alternate captains: Andrew Courtney, John-Scott Dickson
- Arena: Independence Events Center
- Average attendance: 5,317 (6th in ECHL)

Team leaders
- Goals: Andrew Courtney (36)
- Assists: Sébastien Thinel (53)
- Points: Sébastien Thinel (70)
- Penalty minutes: Ryley Grantham (116)
- Plus/minus: Brett Stovin (+5)
- Wins: Mike Clemente (13)
- Goals against average: Mike Clemente (2.83)

The 2014–15 Missouri Mavericks season is the 6th season of the ECHL franchise in Independence, Missouri, a suburb of Kansas City, Missouri.

== Off-season ==
On May 21, 2014, Head Coach Scott Hillman announced his resignation from the Mavericks because he is "pursuing other hockey opportunities and wants to move to a community where he and wife Dalyn's sons can compete at the highest level." On May 27, 2014, Hillman was named as the first head coach for the expansion Indy Fuel of the ECHL.

On June 12, 2014 Richard Matvichuk, a 14-year veteran Defenseman in the National Hockey League, was announced as the new head coach for the Mavericks. Matvichuk had spent the previous two seasons as the assistant general manager and defensive assistant for the Allen Americans, also of the Central Hockey League, during which time the team won two consecutive Ray Miron President's Cup league championships.

On June 26, 2014, the Mavericks renewed their affiliation agreement for the 2014-15 season with the Chicago Wolves of the American Hockey League.

Between July 1 and July 11, 2014, Mavericks fans voted for the Top-10 Mavericks players from the first 5 years of the team's existence. Beginning on July 15, 2014, The Examiner newspaper revealed the players one-per-day.

On October 7, 2014, soon before the 2014–15 Central Hockey League season was set to begin, it was announced that the Central Hockey League ceased operations and the Mavericks, along with the Allen Americans, Brampton Beast, Quad City Mallards, Rapid City Rush, Tulsa Oilers, and Wichita Thunder, were all admitted to the ECHL for the 2014–15 ECHL season. All Central Hockey League contracts which had already been signed by players for the 2014-15 Central Hockey League season were immediately nullified, which forced the team to hastily attempt to re-sign as many players as possible to ECHL contracts. For the 2014-15 ECHL season, the Mavericks were designated to play in the Midwest Division of the Western Conference in the ECHL.

In February 2015, Lamar Hunt Jr., son of former Kansas City Chiefs owner Lamar Hunt, purchased the Mavericks outright from majority owner Matt Adams, partners Mark Adams and Mike Carper, and General Manager Brent Thiessen, who had a minority stake in the organization. Hunt Jr. will own the team through his company Loretto Sports Ventures, LLC.

== Regular season ==
Western Conference

Central Division	GP	W	L	OTL	SOL	GF	GA	PTS
y – Allen Americans (SJ)	72	48	14	6	4	292	203	106
x – Rapid City Rush (Ind.)	72	37	28	2	5	218	206	81
x – Quad City Mallards (MIN)	72	37	28	4	3	205	186	81
x – Tulsa Oilers (Ind.)	72	37	29	3	3	248	244	80
Wichita Thunder (Ind.)	72	32	31	2	7	213	240	73
Missouri Mavericks (AHL-CHI)	72	28	35	5	4	192	231	65
Brampton Beast (Ind.)	72	23	46	3	0	181	298	49

Pacific Division	GP	W	L	OTL	SOL	GF	GA	PTS
y – Idaho Steelheads (DAL)	72	48	18	2	4	258	187	102
x – Ontario Reign (LA/WPG)	72	43	19	4	6	239	184	96
x – Colorado Eagles (CGY)	72	41	23	4	4	236	209	90
x – Utah Grizzlies (ANA)	72	37	27	5	3	213	219	82
Alaska Aces (MIN/STL)	72	35	30	3	4	237	233	77
Bakersfield Condors (EDM)	72	26	38	3	5	202	265	60
Stockton Thunder (NYI)	72	21	49	1	1	199	296	44

x - clinched playoff spot, y - clinched regular season division title, z - Brabham Cup (regular season) champion

== Awards, records, and milestones ==
Player/Team	Award/Record
Chris Crane	Named to 2015 CCM/ECHL All-Star Classic
Landon Oslanski	Named to 2015 CCM/ECHL All-Star Classic

== Transactions ==
=== Player signings and acquisitions off of waivers ===
Player	Former team	Date
John-Scott Dickson	Re-Signed	June 24, 2014
Andrew Courtney	Re-Signed	June 24, 2014
Scott Langdon	Stockton Thunder	June 27, 2014
T.J. Battani	Utah Grizzlies	June 27, 2014
Sébastien Thinel	Re-Signed	July 7, 2014
Dave Pszenyczny	Re-Signed	July 12, 2014
Evan Vossen	Re-Signed	July 12, 2014
Ben Power	Rapid City Rush	July 12, 2014
Collin Circelli	Gap	July 17, 2014
Dallas Ehrhardt	Allen Americans	July 17, 2014
Colten Hayes	Re-Signed	July 30, 2014
Josh Unice	Gwinnett Gladiators	August 7, 2014
Kellan Tochkin	Evansville IceMen	August 7, 2014
Garett Bembridge	Denver Cutthroats	August 20, 2014
Kyle Fletcher	Denver Cutthroats	September 10, 2014
Alex Velischek	Arizona Sundogs	September 10, 2014
Mike Clemente	Evansville IceMen	September 20, 2014
Eric Meland	HC '05 Banská Bystrica	September 20, 2014
Ryley Grantham	Toledo Walleye	September 20, 2014
John Griggs	Denver Cutthroats	September 24, 2014
Erik Higby	Northern Michigan University	September 24, 2014
Justin Kirsch	Mount Royal University	September 25, 2014
Frank Schumacher	Gatineau Olympiques	September 25, 2014
Armand de Swardt	Cornell University	October 9, 2014
Mike Donnellan	University of Massachusetts Amherst	October 9, 2014
Chris Kravchuk	Chicago Wolves	October 9, 2014
Ben Meisner	Allen Americans	October 9, 2014
David Rutherford	Visby/Roma HK	October 9, 2014
Loren Barron	Evansville IceMen	October 21, 2014
Lindsay Sparks	Cincinnati Cyclones	November 3, 2014
Steven Tarasuk	SV Kaltern/Caldaro Eishockey	November 11, 2014
Tony DeHart	Gwinnett Gladiators	November 11, 2014
Ryan Hill	Knoxville Ice Bears	November 15, 2014
Ryan Hill	Knoxville Ice Bears	November 24, 2014
Ben Power	Knoxville Ice Bears	November 25, 2014
Andrew Darrigo	Brampton Beast	December 30, 2014
Geordie Wudrick	Orlando Solar Bears	December 30, 2014
Kris Hogg	Tilburg Trappers	January 5, 2015
Kevin Sullivan	Cincinnati Cyclones	January 24, 2015 (Waiver claim)
Matt Stephenson	Re-signed	February 6, 2015
Charles Lachance	Tulsa Oilers	February 11, 2015
Kain Allicock	University of Waterloo	February 20, 2015
Geordie Wudrick	Louisiana IceGators	February 28, 2015
Sy Nutkevitch	Bakersfield Condors	February 11, 2015
Jack Combs	Stockton Thunder	March 17, 2015
Brett Stovin	Saskatoon Blades	March 28, 2015
Brandon Jaeger	University of Wisconsin–Stevens Point	March 29, 2015
Derik Johnson	University of Minnesota Duluth	April 3, 2015

=== Free agency loses, player releases, and player retirements ===
Player	Free Agency Loss (New Team)/Waived (New Team)/Placed on Team Suspension (New Team)/Retired	Date
Éric Castonguay	Rejoined Parent Club (Chicago Wolves) & Subsequent Free Agency (Frisk Asker)	May 17, 2014
Mathieu Gagnon	Free Agency (Briançon)	May 26, 2014
Henrik Ødegaard	Free Agency (Lørenskog)	June 16, 2014
Anders Franzon	Free Agency (Indy Fuel)	July 10, 2014
Shane Owen	Free Agency (Stockton Thunder)	July 11, 2014
Erno Suomalainen	Free Agency (KeuPa HT)	July 28, 2014
Tyler Currier	Free Agency (Alaska Aces)	August 21, 2014
John-Scott Dickson	CHL Contract Nullified due to Mavericks' Move to ECHL (Re-signed with Mavericks under ECHL contract)	October 7, 2014
Andrew Courtney	CHL Contract Nullified due to Mavericks' Move to ECHL (Re-signed with Mavericks under ECHL contract)	October 7, 2014
Scott Langdon	CHL Contract Nullified due to Mavericks' Move to ECHL (Re-signed with Mavericks under ECHL contract)	October 7, 2014
T.J. Battani	CHL Contract Nullified due to Mavericks' Move to ECHL	October 7, 2014
Sébastien Thinel	CHL Contract Nullified due to Mavericks' Move to ECHL (Re-signed with Mavericks under ECHL contract)	October 7, 2014
Dave Pszenyczny	CHL Contract Nullified due to Mavericks' Move to ECHL (Tulsa Oilers)	October 7, 2014
Evan Vossen	CHL Contract Nullified due to Mavericks' Move to ECHL (Re-signed with Mavericks under ECHL contract)	October 7, 2014
Ben Power	CHL Contract Nullified due to Mavericks' Move to ECHL (Re-signed with Mavericks under ECHL contract)	October 7, 2014
Collin Circelli	CHL Contract Nullified due to Mavericks' Move to ECHL (Grand Falls-Windsor Cataracts)	October 7, 2014
Dallas Ehrhardt	CHL Contract Nullified due to Mavericks' Move to ECHL (Re-signed with Mavericks under ECHL contract)	October 7, 2014
Erik Higby	CHL Contract Nullified due to Mavericks' Move to ECHL (Wichita Thunder)	October 7, 2014
Josh Unice	CHL Contract Nullified due to Mavericks' Move to ECHL (Re-signed with Mavericks under ECHL contract)	October 7, 2014
Kellan Tochkin	CHL Contract Nullified due to Mavericks' Move to ECHL (Re-signed with Mavericks under ECHL contract)	October 7, 2014
Garett Bembridge	CHL Contract Nullified due to Mavericks' Move to ECHL (Re-signed with Mavericks under ECHL contract)	October 7, 2014
Kyle Fletcher	CHL Contract Nullified due to Mavericks' Move to ECHL (Re-signed with Mavericks under ECHL contract)	October 7, 2014
Alex Velischek	CHL Contract Nullified due to Mavericks' Move to ECHL (Re-signed with Mavericks under ECHL contract)	October 7, 2014
Eric Meland	CHL Contract Nullified due to Mavericks' Move to ECHL (Re-signed with Mavericks under ECHL contract)	October 7, 2014
John Griggs	CHL Contract Nullified due to Mavericks' Move to ECHL (Re-signed with Mavericks under ECHL contract)	October 7, 2014
Justin Kirsch	CHL Contract Nullified due to Mavericks' Move to ECHL (Re-signed with Mavericks under ECHL contract)	October 7, 2014
Frank Schumacher	CHL Contract Nullified due to Mavericks' Move to ECHL (Re-signed with Mavericks under ECHL contract)	October 7, 2014
Chris Kravchuk	Released (Dayton Demonz)	October 14, 2014
Frank Schumacher	Released (Peoria Rivermen)	October 14, 2014
Mike Donnellan	Released (Watertown Wolves)	October 14, 2014
Ben Meisner	Released (Wichita Thunder)	October 15, 2014
Ben Power	Released (Knoxville Ice Bears)	October 15, 2014
Paul Swindlehurst	Released (Dundee Stars)	October 15, 2014
Randy Cameron	Released (Fayetteville FireAntz)	October 21, 2014
Armand de Swardt	Released	October 28, 2014
Eric Meland	Released (Wichita Thunder)	October 28, 2014
Loren Barron	Released (Edinburgh Capitals)	November 3, 2014
Kyle Fletcher	Released (Peoria Rivermen)	November 3, 2014
Justin Kirsch	Released (Knoxville Ice Bears)	November 11, 2014
Ryan Hill	Released (Knoxville Ice Bears)	November 19, 2014
Ryan Hill	Released (Knoxville Ice Bears)	December 6, 2014
John Griggs	Released (Indy Fuel)	January 3, 2015
Sebastian Geoffrion	Released (Gwinnett Gladiators)	January 28, 2015
Zack Josepher	Released (Elmira Jackals)	February 6, 2015
Geordie Wudrick	Released (Louisiana IceGators)	February 14, 2015
Dylan Hood	Released (Wichita Thunder)	March 16, 2015
Gabriel Lévesque	Released	March 16, 2015
Jack Combs	Released (Cincinnati Cyclones)	March 24, 2015
Geordie Wudrick	Released (Newcastle North Stars)	March 31, 2015
Andrew Darrigo	Released	April 3, 2015
Derik Johnson	Released	April 12, 2015

=== Trades ===
October 9, 2014	To Rapid City Rush: Josh Unice	To Missouri: Undisclosed considerations
October 13, 2014	To Rapid City Rush: Jonathan Narbonne (Traded December 28, 2014)	To Missouri: Jared Brown
October 13, 2014	To Florida Everblades: Future considerations	To Missouri: Guy Leboeuf
October 14, 2014	To Greenville Road Warriors: Undisclosed considerations	To Missouri: Sebastian Geoffrion
October 14, 2014	To Gwinnett Gladiators: Undisclosed considerations	To Missouri: Randy Cameron
October 14, 2014	To Indy Fuel: Future considerations	To Missouri: Paul Swindlehurst
October 27, 2014	To Greenville Road Warriors: Future considerations	To Missouri: Alex Lepkowski
October 28, 2014	To Cincinnati Cyclones: Ross Ring-Jarvi, Alex Velischek	To Missouri: Martin Lee
November 2, 2014	To Greenville Road Warriors: Future considerations	To Missouri: Brandon Hynes
November 6, 2014	To Alaska Aces: Re-Assignment of Colten Hayes by Chicago Wolves	To Missouri: Ross Ring-Jarvi
November 8, 2014	To Reading Royals: Kevin Sullivan	To Missouri: Colby Cohen
November 10, 2014	To South Carolina Stingrays: Colby Cohen	To Missouri: Future considerations
November 11, 2014	To Allen: Future considerations	To Missouri: Devin DiDiomete
November 18, 2014	To Indy Fuel: Garett Bembridge	To Missouri: Future considerations
November 18, 2014	To Kalamazoo Wings: Future considerations	To Missouri: Josh Brittain
November 18, 2014	To Kalamazoo Wings: Future considerations	To Missouri: Brendan Rempel
November 24, 2014	To South Carolina Stingrays: Brandon Hynes, Guy Leboeuf	To Missouri: Jack Downing
November 24, 2014	To Idaho Steelheads: Devin DiDiomete	To Missouri: Future considerations
November 25, 2014	To Greenville Road Warriors: Ben Power	To Missouri: Undisclosed considerations
December 1, 2014	To Elmira Jackals: Kellan Tochkin	To Missouri: Patch Alber
December 2, 2014	To Wichita Thunder: Future considerations	To Missouri: Zack Josepher
December 2, 2014	To Wichita Thunder: Future considerations	To Missouri: Zack Josepher
December 9, 2014	To Brampton Beast: Steven Tarasuk	To Missouri: Future considerations
December 9, 2014	To Bakersfield Condors: Future considerations	To Missouri: Jonathan Narbonne
January 5, 2015	To Indy Fuel: Evan Vossen	To Missouri: Future considerations
January 14, 2015	To Rapid City Rush: Dallas Ehrhardt	To Missouri: Landon Oslanski
January 20, 2015	To Elmira Jackals: Undisclosed considerations	To Missouri: Player rights to Josh Robinson
January 22, 2015	To Ontario Reign: David Rutherford	To Missouri: Geoff Walker
January 29, 2015	To Ontario Reign: Future considerations	To Missouri: Dylan Hood
March 6, 2015	To Bakersfield Condors: Future considerations	To Missouri: Gabriel Lévesque
March 6, 2015	To Ontario Reign: Josh Brittain	To Missouri: Chris Owens, Future considerations
March 12, 2015	To Florida Everblades: Future considerations	To Missouri: Tyson Gimblett
March 12, 2015	To Alaska Aces: Landon Oslanski	To Missouri: Tyler Currier
March 12, 2015	To Idaho Steelheads: Martin Lee	To Missouri: Future considerations, Re-Assignment of Troy Vance and Ludwig Karlsson by Dallas Stars
March 12, 2015	To Cincinnati Cyclones: Jack Downing	To Missouri: Brian Nugent, Lee Reimer, Future Considerations

=== Transfers and on loan players ===
Player	To/From	Affiliate Team	Date
John Griggs	to	Chicago Wolves	September 24, 2014
Erik Higby	to	San Antonio Rampage	September 24, 2014
Ryley Grantham	to	Chicago Wolves	September 29, 2014
Ryley Grantham	from	Chicago Wolves	October 5, 2014
Mike Clemente	from	Chicago Wolves	October 5, 2014
Erik Higby	from	San Antonio Rampage	October 6, 2014
Colten Hayes	from	Chicago Wolves	October 6, 2014
John Griggs	from	Chicago Wolves	October 6, 2014
Colten Hayes	to	Chicago Wolves	November 6, 2014
Chris Crane	from	Worcester Sharks	November 8, 2014
Maxime Lagacé	from	Texas Stars	November 26, 2014
John Griggs	to	Chicago Wolves	November 28, 2014
John Griggs	from	Chicago Wolves	December 4, 2014
Maxime Lagacé	to	Texas Stars	February 2, 2015
Colten Hayes	from	Chicago Wolves	March 11, 2015
Troy Vance	from	Dallas Stars	March 12, 2015
Ludwig Karlsson	from	Dallas Stars	March 12, 2015

=== Player suspensions or placed on leave ===
Player	Team Suspension (New Team, If Applicable)/League Suspension (Number of Games)/Granted Leave to Join National Team	Date Placed on Suspension/Granted Leave	Date Activated from Suspension/Returned from Leave
Colby Cohen	Team Suspension	November 8, 2014	November 10, 2014
Scott Langdon	League Suspension (2 games)	November 11, 2014	
Tony DeHart	Team Suspension (HC Eppan Pirates)	November 12, 2014	
Andrew Darrigo	League Suspension (1 Game) "...and fined an undisclosed amount as a result of his actions in ECHL Game #876, Missouri at Allen, on Jan. 10."	January 11, 2015	
Josh Robinson	Team Suspension	January 21, 2015	January 28, 2015
Kris Hogg	Team Suspension	January 28, 2015 (KH Sanok)	
Sy Nutkevitch	Team Suspension (Knoxville Ice Bears)	March 3, 2015	
Sébastien Thinel	League Suspension (3 Games) "and fined an undisclosed amount as a result of his actions in ECHL Game #956, Rapid City at Missouri, on March 8."	March 10, 2015	
Chris Owens	Team Suspension	March 11, 2015	March 18, 2015
Brian Nugent	Team Suspension	March 12, 2015	
Jack Combs	Team Suspension	March 17, 2015	March 24, 2015 (Released by team)

=== Injured reserve ===
Player	Date Placed on Injured Reserve	Date Activated from Injured Reserve
John-Scott Dickson	October 15, 2014	November 28, 2014
Sebastian Geoffrion	November 7, 2014	November 23, 2014
Ryley Grantham	November 11, 2014	November 23, 2014
Dallas Ehrhardt	December 2, 2014	December 20, 2014
Ryley Grantham	December 2, 2014	January 17, 2015
Brendan Rempel	December 7, 2014	December 30, 2014
Sebastian Geoffrion	December 21, 2014	January 28, 2015 (released by team)
Zack Josepher	December 23, 2014	February 6, 2015 (released by team)
Brendan Rempel	January 5, 2015 (Season-ending)	
John-Scott Dickson	January 12, 2015	February 21, 2015
Ryley Grantham	February 21, 2015	
Scott Langdon	February 25, 2015	
Charles Lachance	February 28, 2015	

== Roster ==
As of April 12, 2015

No.	Nat	Player	Pos	S/G	Age	Acquired	Birthplace	Contract
5	(United States)	Patch Alber	D	R	37	2014	Clifton Park, New York	Mavericks
20	(Canada)	Kain Allicock	LW	L	36	2015	Markham, Ontario	Mavericks
11	(United States)	Jared Brown	F	R	40	2014	Gardner, Kansas	Mavericks
35	(United States)	Mike Clemente	G	L	36	2014	Great Falls, Virginia	Wolves
27	(Canada)	Andrew Courtney (A)	F	R	41	2011	Belleville, Ontario	Mavericks
16	(United States)	Tyler Currier	RW	R	38	2015	Anchorage, Alaska	Mavericks
40	(Canada)	John-Scott Dickson (A)	LW	R	42	2011	North York, Ontario	Mavericks
71	(Canada)	Ryley Grantham	C	L	38	2014	Hanna, Alberta	Mavericks
29	(Canada)	Tyson Gimblett	D	L	41	2015	Newtonville, Ontario	Mavericks
44	(Canada)	Colten Hayes	D	R	36	2015	Maple Ridge, British Columbia	Wolves
32	(United States)	Brandon Jaeger	G	R	36	2015	Champlin, Minnesota	Mavericks
41	(Sweden)	Ludwig Karlsson	F	L	35	2015	Stockholm, Sweden	Stars
8	(Canada)	Charles Lachance	F	L	38	2015	Quebec City, Quebec	Mavericks
25	(Canada)	Scott Langdon	D	L	41	2014	Ancaster, Ontario	Mavericks
28	(United States)	Alex Lepkowski	D	R	33	2014	Buffalo, New York	Mavericks
37	(Canada)	Chris Owens	D	L	37	2015	St. John's, Newfoundland	Mavericks
24	(United States)	Brendan Rempel	D	R	35	2014	Willington, Connecticut	Mavericks
30	(United States)	Josh Robinson	G	R	36	2015	Frankenmuth, Michigan	Mavericks
2	(Canada)	Lee Reimer	F	L	36	2015	Landmark, Manitoba	Mavericks
19	(Canada)	Lindsay Sparks	F	L	36	2014	Oakville, Ontario	Mavericks
24	(Canada)	Matt Stephenson	D	R	42	2015	Midland, Ontario	Mavericks
21	(Canada)	Brett Stovin	RW	R	31	2015	Stony Mountain, Manitoba	Mavericks
43	(Canada)	Sébastien Thinel (C)	RW	L	45	2011	St. Jerome, Quebec	Mavericks
13	(United States)	Troy Vance	D	R	33	2015	Goshen, New York	Stars
12	(Canada)	Geoff Walker	RW	R	38	2015	Charlottetown, Prince Edward Island	Mavericks

== See also ==
- 2014–15 ECHL season
