= Ira Smith (announcer) =

American public address announcer

Ira C. Smith was an American public address announcer who had worked for the Sacramento Kings of the National Basketball Association. Since 1976, Smith has been called the Voice of Napa Valley Sports for KVON and KVYN, covering many local sports.

== Early life and military service ==
Smith was born and raised in Plum Tree, Indiana. He grew up listening to sportscasters Hilliard Gates and Chris Schenkel. He graduated from Hanover College with a degree in business administration.

He was then drafted into the Army. A major assigned him to the Army Public Information Office as a Broadcast Specialist because of the sound of his voice.

== Career ==
After leaving the military, Ira started his civilian career in radio management and sportscasting. In the 1960s, he was the University of Cincinnati's sports director of their radio station, broadcasting Cincinnati Royals' games. Along the way Ira worked at WHLT in Columbia City, Indiana (4 years), WMRI AM and FM in Marion, Indiana (2 years) and WVMO in Monroe, Michigan where he also, for six years, broadcast University of Michigan football.

In 1975, Smith moved to the Napa Valley to become KVON's Sports Director. Since 1976, he has been called the Voice of Napa Valley Sports for KVON and KVYN, covering many local sports. He has announced over 600 football and 1,300 basketball games in the Napa Valley area.

In 2000, with the death of long-time Sacramento Kings public address announcer Fred Anderson, the Kings held auditions for the position. Smith sent his audition tape, and for the final test, he had to broadcast half of a game between the Kings and the Utah Jazz, while the other finalist, Eric Hasseltine, broadcast the other half. He passed the audition and joined the Kings' staff that year. From 2000 to 2003, Smith was the main public address announcer for the team and from the 2003–04 season onward, he shared the public address announcing duties with Scott Moak. They worked together until he left in 2007.

Smith provided the voice of the Public Address Announcer in ESPN's NBA 2K2, NBA 2K3, and NBA 2K4 video games. He has also emceed Sacramento's Harvest Festival for over 20 years.

== Community involvement ==
Smith has served as past president of the Kiwanis Club for Napa and past president of the Napa Valley Tennis Association. He received the Napa Chamber of Commerce "Volunteer of the Year" award. He was also an ambassador for the Napa Chamber of Commerce, and was honored as its Ambassador of the Year in 2017.

== Honors ==
Smith was inducted into the Napa High School Athletic Hall of Fame on March 5, 2022. On September 10, 2022, the Vintage High School Athletic Hall of Fame also inducted him. On November 2, 2022, he was inducted into the Bay Area Radio Hall of Fame.

== Personal life ==
Smith had two sons, Brad and Tyler Smith, and a daughter, Heidi Horton. . Ira C Smith died on July 20, 2024, in Napa, California, from cardiac arrest. He was 88.
