= Dallas Ehrhardt =

Canadian hockey player

- Born: 31 July 1992 (age 33) Calgary, Alberta, Canada
- Height: 6 ft 4 in (193 cm)
- Weight: 225 lb (102 kg; 16 st 1 lb)
- Position: Defenceman
- Shoots: Left
- EIHL team Former teams: Manchester Storm; Evansville IceMen; Allen Americans; Missouri Mavericks; Rapid City Rush; Wheeling Nailers; Ducs de Dijon
- National team: Great Britain
- NHL draft: Undrafted
- Playing career: 2013–present

Dallas Ehrhardt (born 31 July 1992) is a Canadian-born ice hockey defenceman playing for Manchester Storm of the Elite Ice Hockey League.

His brother Travis Ehrhardt also plays ice hockey.

== Career statistics ==
=== Regular season and playoffs ===
			Regular season					Playoffs
Season	Team	League	GP	G	A	Pts	PIM	GP	G	A	Pts	PIM
2009–10	Brandon Wheat Kings	WHL	12	0	1	1	11	—	—	—	—	—
2009–10	Moose Jaw Warriors	WHL	13	0	3	3	13	—	—	—	—	—
2010–11	Moose Jaw Warriors	WHL	55	1	19	20	74	2	0	0	0	2
2011–12	Moose Jaw Warriors	WHL	67	4	18	22	78	14	0	3	3	2
2012–13	Prince George Cougars	WHL	62	6	17	23	78	—	—	—	—	—
2013–14	Evansville IceMen	ECHL	1	0	0	0	0	—	—	—	—	—
2013–14	Allen Americans	CHL	47	0	7	7	104	—	—	—	—	—
2014–15	Missouri Mavericks	ECHL	23	1	3	4	26	—	—	—	—	—
2014–15	Rapid City Rush	ECHL	30	3	8	11	80	11	1	3	4	12
2015–16	Wheeling Nailers	ECHL	1	0	0	0	0	—	—	—	—	—
2015–16	Ducs de Dijon	Ligue Magnus	9	0	1	1	30	10	1	4	5	18
2016–17	Manchester Storm	EIHL	51	1	8	9	77	2	0	1	1	2
2017–18	Manchester Storm	EIHL	53	10	13	23	78	2	0	2	2	0
2018–19	Manchester Storm	EIHL	60	16	31	47	82	—	—	—	—	—
2019–20	Manchester Storm	EIHL	41	8	17	25	60	—	—	—	—	—
2020–21	Manchester Storm	Elite Series	14	5	7	12	10	—	—	—	—	—
2021–22	Manchester Storm	EIHL	54	11	21	32	65	—	—	—	—	—
2022–23	Manchester Storm	EIHL	53	9	17	26	18	2	0	0	0	2
2023–24	Manchester Storm	EIHL	45	6	12	18	33	2	0	0	0	2
2024–25	Manchester Storm	EIHL	49	4	11	15	19	—	—	—	—	—
2025–26	Manchester Storm	EIHL	13	1	1	2	7	—	—	—	—	—
ECHL totals			55	4	11	15	106	11	1	3	4	12

=== International ===
Year	Team	Event	GP	G	A	Pts	PIM
2018	Great Britain	WC (D1A)	5	0	1	1	8
2019	Great Britain	WC	7	0	0	0	0
2020	Great Britain	OGQ	3	1	2	3	0
2021	Great Britain	WC	5	0	0	0	0
2022	Great Britain	WC	7	0	0	0	2
Senior totals			27	1	3	4	10
