= Jack Combs (ice hockey) =

American professional ice hockey forward

- Born: January 26, 1988 (age 38) St. Louis, Missouri, U.S.
- Height: 5 ft 11 in (180 cm)
- Weight: 194 lb (88 kg; 13 st 12 lb)
- Position: Forward
- Shot: Left
- Played for: Peoria Rivermen; Chicago Wolves; Worcester Sharks; Bridgeport Sound Tigers; San Antonio Rampage; Oklahoma City Barons; Toros Neftekamsk; IF Björklöven; Hartford Wolf Pack; Fischtown Pinguins; Iserlohn Roosters; EHC Kloten; SC Csíkszereda
- NHL draft: Undrafted
- Playing career: 2009–2023 Coaching career

Current position
- Title: Assistant coach
- Team: Lindenwood
- Conference: Independent

Coaching career (HC unless noted)
- 2023–Present: Lindenwood (asst.)

Jack Combs (born January 26, 1988) is an American former professional ice hockey forward.

== Playing career ==
Prior to turning professional, Combs played for the California Wave Midget team for one season and for five seasons with the Kitchener Rangers and Saginaw Spirit of the Ontario Hockey League. Combs attended the training camp of the Colorado Avalanche of the National Hockey League in 2008 before he signed with the Alaska Aces for his first professional season in 2009–10. After 11 games with the Aces, Combs was traded to the Trenton Devils of the ECHL. On April 5, 2010, Combs signed a Professional Try Out contract with the Peoria Rivermen of the American Hockey League For his second season, Combs signed with the Tulsa Oilers of the Central Hockey League, an affiliate of the Colorado Avalanche. Establishing a formidable partnership alongside linemate Chad Costello, Costello and Combs ranked 9th and 10th, respectively, in total points (84 and 82) in the league in 2010-11.

On August 18, 2011, Combs, alongside his Tulsa linemate Costello, signed with the Colorado Eagles of the ECHL. After combining with Costello to lead the league in scoring after 23 games with 37 points in the 2011–12 season, Combs signed mid-season with the Worcester Sharks of the American Hockey League.

Combs returned to the Eagles the following season and scored 42 points (19 goals and 23 assists) in 27 games. His partnership with Costello was signified when they both were signed to Professional Try Out contract with the Bridgeport Sound Tigers of the American Hockey League on December 18, 2012. On January 9, 2013, Combs and Costello were both signed by the Sound Tigers to Standard Player Contracts for the remainder of the 2012–13 season. Combs played in 22 games with the Sound Tigers for 14 points (5 goals and 9 assists) before he was traded to the San Antonio Rampage in exchange for future considerations on March 14, 2013.

After starting the 2013-14 season playing 19 games for the Rampage and 8 games for the Cincinnati Cyclones, the Rampage's ECHL affiliate, the Rampage traded Combs to the Oklahoma City Barons in exchange for Derek Nesbitt.

For the 2014-15 season, Combs signed with the Russian club Toros Neftekamsk of the Supreme Hockey League (VHL). After only 11 games, Combs opted to leave Toros Neftekamsk and return to North America. On October 21, 2014, Combs signed a contract with the Allen Americans of the ECHL to re-unite with Chad Costello. Though he was leading the ECHL at the time in scoring for the 2014-15 season with 56 points, Combs signed with the Swedish club IF Björklöven of HockeyAllsvenskan in January 2015. In light of Combs' departure, the Americans waived him on February 14, 2015. Due to his desire for more ice time than the team could offer and to rejoin the Allen Americans, Combs was released by IF Björklöven on February 14, 2015 after playing only three games. Combs' attempt to rejoin the Americans was stifled when his ECHL rights were claimed off of waivers by the Stockton Thunder on February 15, 2015.

Combs reported to the Thunder and played 11 games for the team, accumulating 5 goals and 8 assists. With the Thunder out of playoff contention, Thunder Head Coach Rich Kromm fulfilled a promise made to Combs and placed him on waivers on March 17, 2015 to try to help Combs re-join the Americans.

Combs' attempt to return to the Americans was again stifled when his ECHL rights were claimed off of waivers by the Missouri Mavericks. Before playing a game for the Mavericks, Combs was released by the team on March 24, 2015, which again placed Combs' ECHL rights on waivers. On March 25, 2015, Combs' ECHL rights were claimed off of waivers by the Cincinnati Cyclones, to which he did report, playing his first game for the team on March 27, 2015.

On September 16, 2015, Combs earned an AHL contract, agreeing to a one-year deal with the Hartford Wolf Pack. After attending the Wolf Pack training camp, he was assigned to ECHL affiliate, the Greenville Swamp Rabbits to begin the 2015–16 season. In splitting the year between the two club, Combs appeared in 18 games for the Wolf Pack with 2 goals and 4 points.

On July 11, 2016, Combs embarked on another European contract, agreeing to a one-year deal with newly promoted DEL club, Fischtown Pinguins. He scored 27 goals in 51 contests in the 2016-17 regular season, which made him the league's leading goal-scorer that year. Combs left Bremerhaven after the 2016-17 season and signed with fellow DEL side Iserlohn Roosters in May 2017.

On October 24, 2019, Combs returned to playing hockey in North America by signing with the Wichita Thunder of the ECHL.

Following two further European seasons, on October 15, 2021, Combs opted to return to North American and join former club, the Allen Americans of the ECHL, on a one-year deal.

== Career statistics ==
			Regular season					Playoffs
Season	Team	League	GP	G	A	Pts	PIM	GP	G	A	Pts	PIM
2003–04	California Wave	SCAHA	48	58	45	103	49	—	—	—	—	—
2004–05	Kitchener Rangers	OHL	59	1	5	6	12	3	0	0	0	2
2005–06	Saginaw Spirit	OHL	59	11	10	21	80	3	0	1	1	0
2006–07	Saginaw Spirit	OHL	51	10	23	33	56	6	3	3	6	8
2007–08	Saginaw Spirit	OHL	67	42	58	100	93	4	0	1	1	4
2008–09	Saginaw Spirit	OHL	62	32	43	75	102	8	9	4	13	8
2009–10	Alaska Aces	ECHL	11	1	3	4	2	—	—	—	—	—
2009–10	Trenton Devils	ECHL	49	23	16	39	63	—	—	—	—	—
2009–10	Peoria Rivermen	AHL	3	0	1	1	0	—	—	—	—	—
2010–11	Tulsa Oilers	CHL	64	40	42	82	42	10	3	7	10	12
2010–11	Chicago Wolves	AHL	3	0	0	0	0	—	—	—	—	—
2011–12	Colorado Eagles	ECHL	23	17	20	37	22	—	—	—	—	—
2011–12	Worcester Sharks	AHL	50	16	14	30	24	—	—	—	—	—
2012–13	Colorado Eagles	ECHL	27	19	23	42	22	—	—	—	—	—
2012–13	Bridgeport Sound Tigers	AHL	22	5	9	14	14	—	—	—	—	—
2012–13	San Antonio Rampage	AHL	18	12	7	19	2	—	—	—	—	—
2013–14	San Antonio Rampage	AHL	19	0	2	2	18	—	—	—	—	—
2013–14	Cincinnati Cyclones	ECHL	8	9	4	13	4	—	—	—	—	—
2013–14	Oklahoma City Barons	AHL	29	5	4	9	16	3	0	0	0	2
2014–15	Toros Neftekamsk	VHL	11	0	7	7	4	—	—	—	—	—
2014–15	Allen Americans	ECHL	32	22	34	56	32	—	—	—	—	—
2014–15	IF Björklöven	Allsv	3	1	0	1	0	—	—	—	—	—
2014–15	Stockton Thunder	ECHL	10	5	8	13	11	—	—	—	—	—
2014–15	Cincinnati Cyclones	ECHL	5	4	3	7	4	—	—	—	—	—
2015–16	Greenville Swamp Rabbits	ECHL	40	27	25	52	16	—	—	—	—	—
2015–16	Hartford Wolf Pack	AHL	18	2	2	4	2	—	—	—	—	—
2016–17	Fischtown Pinguins	DEL	51	27	18	45	12	6	3	3	6	4
2017–18	Iserlohn Roosters	DEL	52	22	12	34	24	2	1	0	1	2
2018–19	EHC Kloten	SL	25	12	12	24	30	5	0	0	0	4
2019–20	Wichita Thunder	ECHL	15	5	10	15	14	—	—	—	—	—
2019–20	EC Bad Nauheim	DEL2	25	7	13	20	42	1	1	1	2	4
2020–21	SC Csíkszereda	Erste	24	16	18	34	12	17	19	5	24	4
2021–22	Rostocker EC	Oberliga	4	0	3	3	2	—	—	—	—	—
2021–22	Allen Americans	ECHL	60	21	41	62	28	4	0	0	0	0
2022–23	Allen Americans	ECHL	70	36	59	95	32	11	5	3	8	2
AHL totals			162	40	39	79	76	3	0	0	0	2
