= John F. Kennedy High School (Sacramento, California) =

Location
- 6715 Gloria Drive; Sacramento, Sacramento County, California 95831; United States
- 38°30′11″N 121°32′03″W

Information
- Type: Public
- Established: 1967
- School district: Sacramento City Unified School District
- Principal: Reginald Brown
- Teaching staff: 83.95 (FTE)
- Grades: 9–12
- Enrollment: 1,888 (2023-2024)
- Student to teacher ratio: 22.49
- Colors: Forest Green & Gold
- Mascot: Cougar
- Newspaper: Kennedy Clarion
- Yearbook: Reflections
- Athletic Conference: Metro Conference
- Website: jfk.scusd.edu

John F. Kennedy High School, a member of the Sacramento City Unified School District and locally known simply as Kennedy, is a public school in the Pocket-Greenhaven Area of Sacramento, California.

== Small Learning Communities ==
John F. Kennedy High School offers four Small Learning Communities (SLCs) that allow students to focus their coursework on specific career paths and academic interests.

=== Health Education Law and Marines (HELM) ===
HELM focuses on preparing students for the education and medical fields through specialized speakers and internship opportunities. The community also houses the Criminal Justice Academy, which maintains a partnership with the Sacramento Police Department, and the school's Marine Corps Junior Reserve Officers Training Course (MCJROTC).

=== Program in America and California Explorations (PACE) ===
PACE emphasizes California history and literature, alongside civic engagement. Students enrolled in the program are required to complete 30 hours of community service per semester, attend designated cultural and civic events, and participate in annual field trips.

=== Manufacturing and Design (MaD) ===
MaD provides technical skills training for students interested in pursuing careers in engineering, automotive, and architecture fields.

=== Visual and Performing Arts (VAPA) ===
VAPA integrates the core high school curriculum with a specialized emphasis on music, drama, dance, and visual arts.

== Notable alumni ==
- Adam Bernero - seven-year MLB pitcher
- Jared Brown - former quarterback for the UNLV Rebels and the San Jose SaberCats of the Arena Football League
- David Chau - former options trader and hedge fund manager (attended)
- Steven Cheung (born 1982), White House Communications Director
- La Vel Freeman - former MLB designated hitter
- Lawrence Frostad - class of 1985, 1992 Olympian Swimmer
- Gift of Gab (Tim Parker) - who is better known as part of the hip hop duo Blackalicious
- Brandi Glanville - Reality TV personality featured on Bravo TV's The Real Housewives of Beverly Hills, and NY Times best-selling author
- Brotha Lynch Hung - Rapper and Community Activist
- Eric Mar - San Francisco County Supervisor, former School Board Member, and Professor at San Francisco State University
- Butch Metzger - former MLB pitcher
- Scott Moak - public address announcer of the Sacramento Kings
- Geno Petralli - 12-year MLB catcher
- Michael Stewart - former NBA center who played for five teams
- Greg Vaughn - four-time MLB All-Star outfielder
- Cornel West - class of 1970, prominent African-American scholar
