= Tanner Fritz =

Canadian ice hockey player

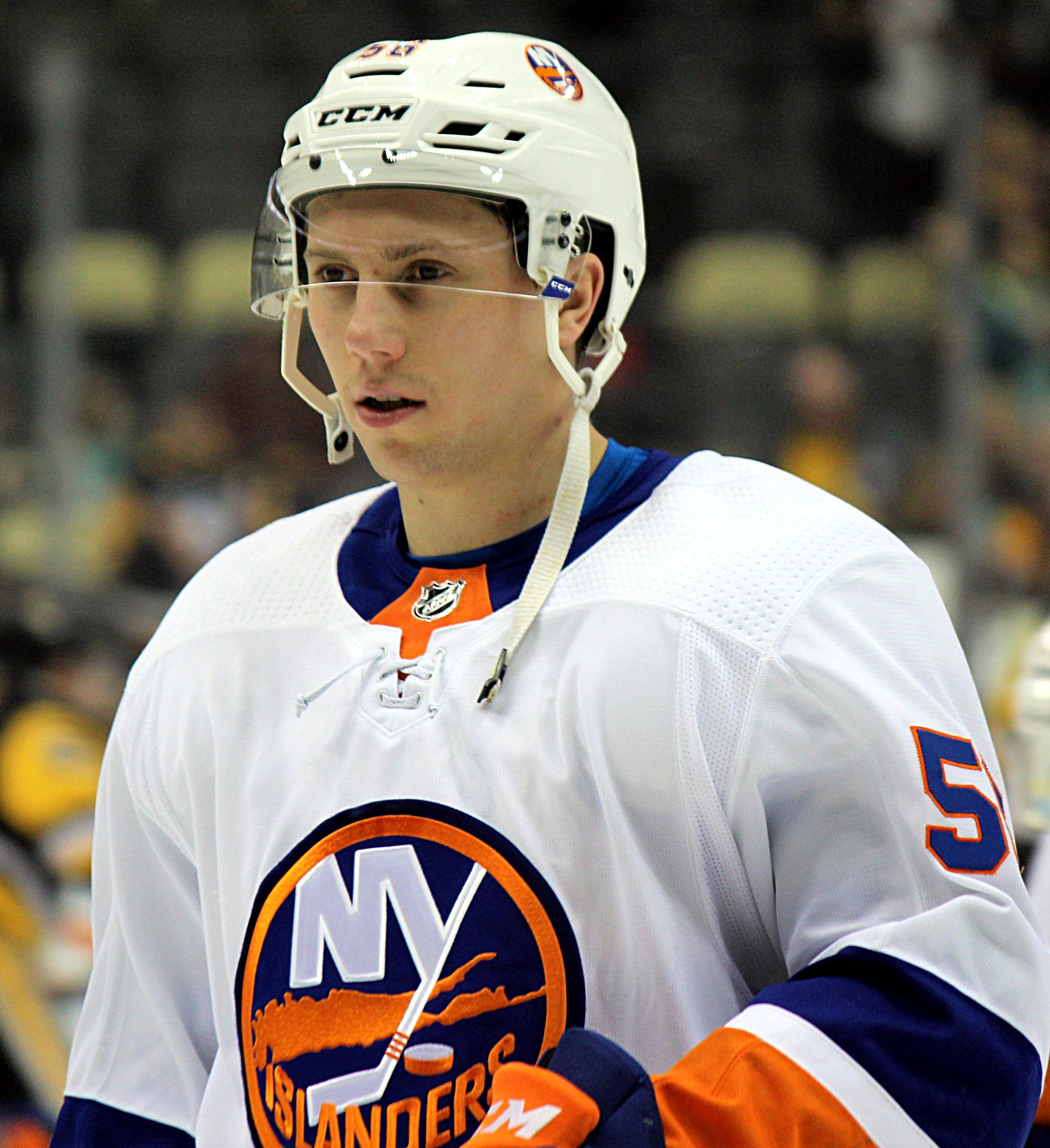
- Fritz with the Islanders in 2018
- Born: August 20, 1991 (age 34) Grande Prairie, Alberta, Canada
- Height: 5 ft 11 in (180 cm)
- Weight: 192 lb (87 kg; 13 st 10 lb)
- Position: Centre
- Shoots: Right
- NL team Former teams: SC Rapperswil-Jona Lakers; Missouri Mavericks; Bridgeport Sound Tigers; New York Islanders; Hartford Wolf Pack; Dinamo Minsk
- NHL draft: Undrafted
- Playing career: 2015–present

Tanner Fritz (born August 20, 1991) is a Canadian professional ice hockey forward who plays for SC Rapperswil-Jona Lakers of the National League (NL).

== Playing career ==
=== Amateur ===
Fritz played for the Grande Prairie Storm of the Alberta Junior Hockey League for four years. While playing with the Storm, he graduated from Grande Prairie St. Joseph High School in 2009 and was named the 2011 AJHL MVP after leading the team in points and ranking fourth in the league. He then attended Ohio State University, and played for the Ohio State Buckeyes men's ice hockey team. Fritz stated that he became interested in Ohio State after his cousin, Daymen Rycroft, began his freshman season there.

While majoring in sport industry, Fritz played 34 games in his freshman season. He scored his first collegiate goal on November 5, 2011, in a 2–0 win over Alabama-Huntsville. In his sophomore year, Fritz played in 40 games and set new career highs with 37 points. He was named to the Second Team All-CCHA, 2013 CCHA scoring champion, Ohio State Scholar-Athlete, and Academic All-Big Ten.

In his junior year, despite missing five games due to an injury, Fritz ranked third on team in points and fourth in the conference for assists. At the conclusion of the season, Fritz was again named an Ohio State Scholar-Athlete and was selected for the Academic All-Big Ten and 2014 Big Ten Sportsmanship Award.

Prior to his senior year, Fritz participated in the Chicago Blackhawks 2014 Prospect Camp. However, he returned to Ohio State and served as the team's captain for the 2014–15 season.

=== Professional ===
Fritz ended his collegiate career by signing with the Missouri Mavericks of the ECHL for the 2015–16 season. However, he tried out for the Bridgeport Sound Tigers of the American Hockey League (AHL) during the 2015–16 season, and made the team. In 43 games for the Mavericks, Fritz scored ten goals and 33 points. In 19 games for the Sound Tigers, he had two goals and 12 points.

Fritz returned exclusively to the Sound Tigers for the 2016-17 season. He upped his previous season's totals by scoring 19 goals and 23 assists in 63 games. On March 29, 2017, Fritz signed a one-year, two-way contract with the Sound Tigers' National Hockey League (NHL) affiliate, the New York Islanders. The contract was set to begin in the 2017-18 season. The Islanders recalled Fritz for the first time on January 1, 2018. and he recorded his first NHL goal on February 19 against the Minnesota Wild.

On May 31, 2019, the Islanders re-signed Fritz to a two-year contract extension.

Following his sixth season within the Islanders organization, Fritz left as a free agent and on September 15, 2021, was signed a one-year contract with the Hartford Wolf Pack of the AHL, the primary affiliate of the New York Rangers.

Following two successful seasons with the Wolf Pack, Fritz opted to return to the Islanders organization as a free agent, signing a one-year AHL deal with Bridgeport on September 5, 2023. In the 2023-24 season, Fritz made 20 regular season appearances with Bridgeport, posting 1 goal and 7 points, before he opted to be released from his contract and sign his first contract abroad in agreeing to a two-year deal with HC Dinamo Minsk of the Kontinental Hockey League (KHL) on December 28, 2023. Fritz played out the season with Dinamo, registering 10 points through 17 regular season games, and adding 1 assist through 6 playoff appearances.

On August 7, 2024, Fritz was mutually released from the remaining year of his contract in Belarus with Minsk to become a free agent.

== Career statistics ==
			Regular season					Playoffs
Season	Team	League	GP	G	A	Pts	PIM	GP	G	A	Pts	PIM
2007–08	Grande Prairie Storm	AJHL	28	4	4	8	14	12	0	1	1	4
2008–09	Grande Prairie Storm	AJHL	57	19	24	43	30	19	4	8	12	4
2009–10	Grande Prairie Storm	AJHL	54	27	27	54	62	9	1	5	6	2
2010–11	Grande Prairie Storm	AJHL	60	31	43	74	29	5	3	3	6	4
2011–12	Ohio State University	CCHA	34	6	8	14	21	—	—	—	—	—
2012–13	Ohio State University	CCHA	40	11	26	37	12	—	—	—	—	—
2013–14	Ohio State University	B1G	32	8	24	32	8	—	—	—	—	—
2014–15	Ohio State University	B1G	36	11	16	27	6	—	—	—	—	—
2015–16	Missouri Mavericks	ECHL	43	10	23	33	10	—	—	—	—	—
2015–16	Bridgeport Sound Tigers	AHL	19	2	10	12	0	3	0	2	2	0
2016–17	Bridgeport Sound Tigers	AHL	63	19	23	42	30	—	—	—	—	—
2017–18	Bridgeport Sound Tigers	AHL	35	10	28	38	26	—	—	—	—	—
2017–18	New York Islanders	NHL	34	3	4	7	8	—	—	—	—	—
2018–19	New York Islanders	NHL	8	0	1	1	2	—	—	—	—	—
2018–19	Bridgeport Sound Tigers	AHL	57	12	25	37	20	—	—	—	—	—
2019–20	Bridgeport Sound Tigers	AHL	4	0	0	0	7	—	—	—	—	—
2020–21	Bridgeport Sound Tigers	AHL	20	3	3	6	10	—	—	—	—	—
2021–22	Hartford Wolf Pack	AHL	62	13	23	36	42	—	—	—	—	—
2022–23	Hartford Wolf Pack	AHL	67	10	33	43	26	9	1	9	10	10
2023–24	Bridgeport Islanders	AHL	20	1	6	7	6	—	—	—	—	—
2023–24	Dinamo Minsk	KHL	17	2	8	10	2	6	0	1	1	2
NHL totals			42	3	5	8	10	—	—	—	—	—
