= Scott Moak =

American public address announcer

Scott Moak is an American public address announcer best known for his work for the Sacramento Kings of the National Basketball Association. He previously worked for the Kings as Vice President of game entertainment, production and content, as well as Vice President of Community Impact.

Moak has also served as the public address voice of NCAA games at California State University, Sacramento and during the U.S. Track & Field Olympic Trials in Sacramento. He married Mackenzie Domingues in 2024.

== Education ==
Moak attended John F. Kennedy High School in Sacramento. He also earned an undergraduate degree in psychology from the University of California, Davis.

== Career ==
After graduating from UC Davis, where he worked as a radio announcer, Moak earned a job as a PA announcer for football and basketball games at Kennedy High School where his father worked.

In 2002, Moak successfully auditioned for the Sacramento Kings to replace their longtime announcer Fred Anderson. From the 2003–2004 season onward, he shared the public address announcing duties with Ira Smith.
