= Eric Neilson =

Canadian ice hockey player (born 1984)

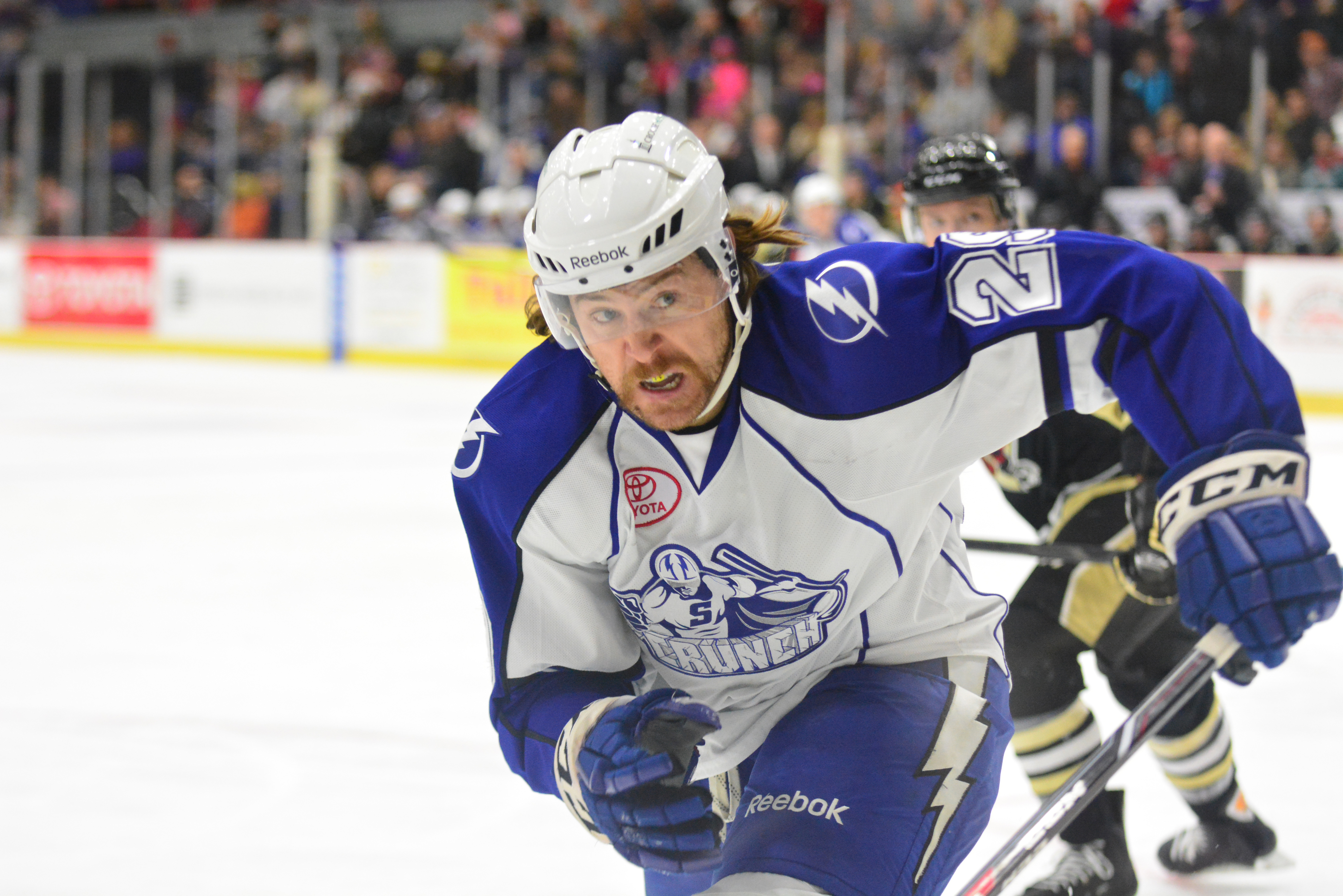
- Neilson with the Syracuse Crunch in 2013
- Born: August 18, 1984 (age 41) Fredericton, New Brunswick, Canada
- Height: 6 ft 1 in (185 cm)
- Weight: 201 lb (91 kg; 14 st 5 lb)
- Position: Right wing
- Shot: Right
- Played for: Peoria Rivermen; Hamilton Bulldogs; San Antonio Rampage; Norfolk Admirals; Syracuse Crunch; St. John's IceCaps; Manchester Storm
- NHL draft: 143rd overall, 2004; Los Angeles Kings
- Playing career: 2005–2017

Eric Neilson (born August 18, 1984) is a Canadian former professional ice hockey player who was known as an enforcer. He last played with the Manchester Storm of the Elite Ice Hockey League (EIHL). Neilson was selected by the Los Angeles Kings in the 5th round (143rd overall) of the 2004 NHL entry draft.

== Playing career ==
On July 13, 2011, Neilson was signed as a free agent by the Norfolk Admirals to a one-year AHL Standard Player's Contract. After appearing in 47 games for the Calder Cup record-setting Admirals, Neilson followed the team affiliation with the Tampa Bay Lightning and signed with the Syracuse Crunch on July 5, 2012. Neilson played 3 seasons with the Crunch, from 2012–13 to 2014–15.

It was announced in May 2016 that Neilson would move from the US and join UK side the Manchester Storm playing in the EIHL - the UK's highest level of professional ice hockey.

== Career statistics ==
			Regular season					Playoffs
Season	Team	League	GP	G	A	Pts	PIM	GP	G	A	Pts	PIM
2001–02	Rimouski Océanic	QMJHL	48	0	2	2	130	4	0	0	0	25
2002–03	Rimouski Océanic	QMJHL	53	2	9	11	341	—	—	—	—	—
2003–04	Rimouski Océanic	QMJHL	50	4	11	15	194	9	0	0	0	28
2004–05	Rimouski Océanic	QMJHL	54	13	13	26	157	11	1	3	4	43
2005–06	Bakersfield Condors	ECHL	47	2	2	4	164	—	—	—	—	—
2006–07	Long Beach Ice Dogs	ECHL	64	4	2	6	131	—	—	—	—	—
2007–08	Alaska Aces	ECHL	34	3	1	4	119	2	0	0	0	6
2007–08	Peoria Rivermen	AHL	18	0	2	2	82	—	—	—	—	—
2008–09	Peoria Rivermen	AHL	50	3	0	3	207	—	—	—	—	—
2009–10	Hamilton Bulldogs	AHL	38	1	2	3	94	—	—	—	—	—
2010–11	San Antonio Rampage	AHL	33	1	2	3	103	—	—	—	—	—
2011–12	Norfolk Admirals	AHL	47	1	0	1	74	—	—	—	—	—
2012–13	Syracuse Crunch	AHL	39	1	0	1	135	—	—	—	—	—
2013–14	Syracuse Crunch	AHL	35	1	2	3	100	—	—	—	—	—
2014–15	Syracuse Crunch	AHL	20	0	1	1	62	—	—	—	—	—
2015–16	St. John's IceCaps	AHL	6	0	0	0	9	—	—	—	—	—
2015–16	Missouri Mavericks	ECHL	18	2	0	2	33	—	—	—	—	—
2016–17	Manchester Storm	EIHL	33	2	6	8	56	2	0	0	0	2
ECHL totals			163	9	7	16	447	—	—	—	—	—
AHL totals			286	8	9	17	866	—	—	—	—	—
