= Patrick Cullity =

American ice hockey player

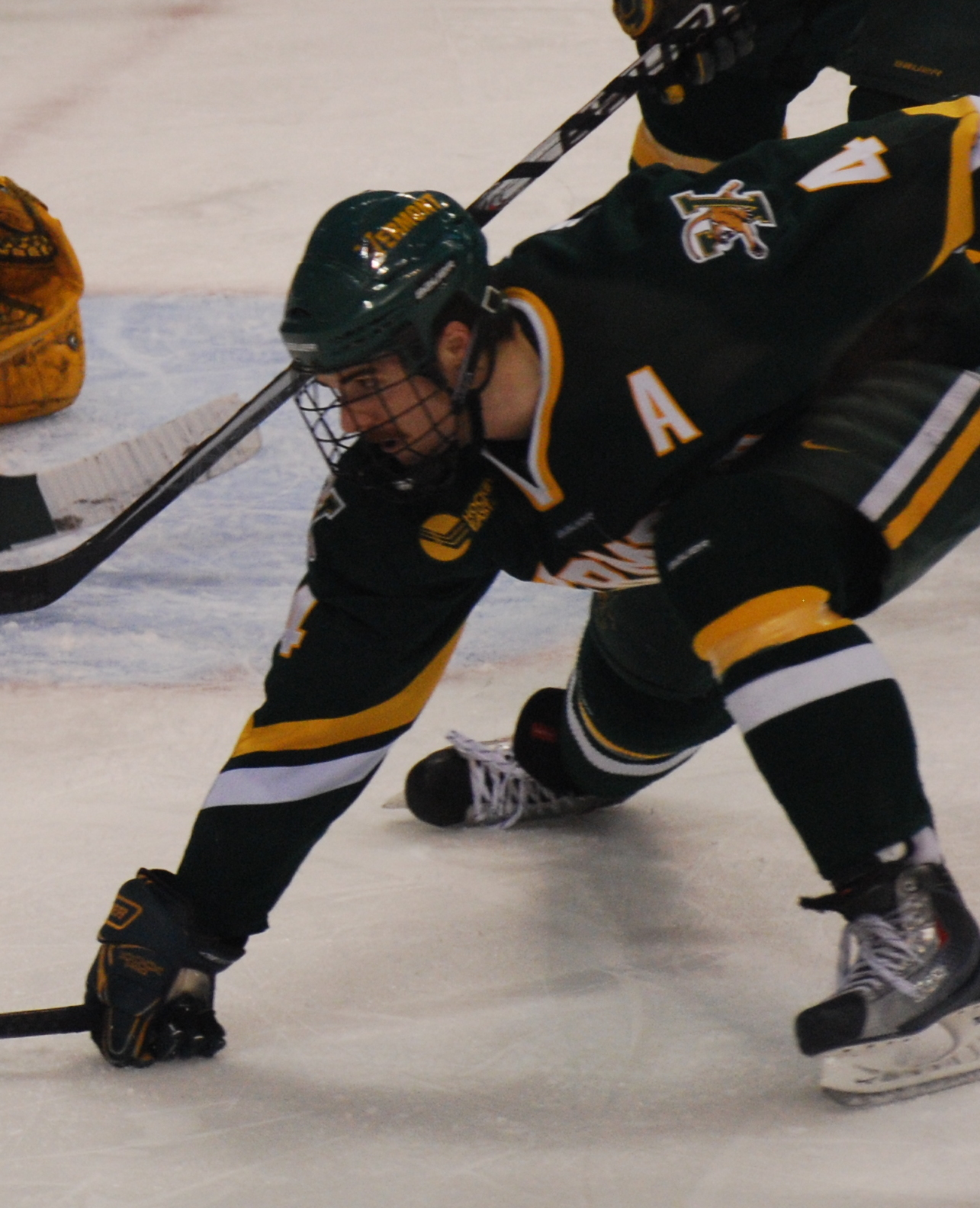
- Cullity playing for the Vermont Catamounts in 2010
- Born: January 26, 1987 (age 38) Tewksbury, Massachusetts, U.S.
- Height: 6 ft 2 in (188 cm)
- Weight: 201 lb (91 kg; 14 st 5 lb)
- Position: Defense
- Shot: Left
- Played for: Syracuse Crunch; Abbotsford Heat; Springfield Falcons; St. John's IceCaps; Bridgeport Sound Tigers
- NHL draft: Undrafted
- Playing career: 2010–2018

Patrick Cullity (born January 26, 1987) is an American former professional ice hockey defenseman. He most notably played with the Bridgeport Sound Tigers of the American Hockey League (AHL).

== Playing career ==
Prior to turning professional, Cullity attended and graduated from the University of Vermont where he played four seasons of NCAA Division I college ice hockey with the Vermont Catamounts men's ice hockey team.

On September 23, 2011, Cullity signed with the ECHL's Utah Grizzlies. He finished the season with the Springfield Falcons of the AHL and in 2012–13 he skated for the Idaho Steelheads and again with Springfield before moving to St. John's in March 2013.

On August 19, 2015, left the Steelheads as a free agent, signing a one-year ECHL contract with the Missouri Mavericks.

After completing his third season within the Bridgeport Sound Tigers in 2017–18, Cullity ended his 8 year professional career, opting to pursue a career in medical sales.

== Career statistics ==
			Regular season					Playoffs
Season	Team	League	GP	G	A	Pts	PIM	GP	G	A	Pts	PIM
2006–07	University of Vermont	HE	34	0	5	5	42	—	—	—	—	—
2007–08	University of Vermont	HE	35	0	2	2	60	—	—	—	—	—
2008–09	University of Vermont	HE	39	0	7	7	94	—	—	—	—	—
2009–10	University of Vermont	HE	37	2	9	11	56	—	—	—	—	—
2009–10	Syracuse Crunch	AHL	5	0	0	0	2	—	—	—	—	—
2010–11	South Carolina Stingrays	ECHL	71	2	15	17	81	3	0	1	1	2
2011–12	Abbotsford Heat	AHL	5	0	1	1	2	—	—	—	—	—
2011–12	Utah Grizzlies	ECHL	20	0	1	1	10	—	—	—	—	—
2011–12	Springfield Falcons	AHL	44	1	8	9	55	—	—	—	—	—
2012–13	Idaho Steelheads	ECHL	39	3	11	14	30	9	2	3	5	4
2012–13	Springfield Falcons	AHL	7	0	0	0	12	—	—	—	—	—
2012–13	St. John's IceCaps	AHL	14	0	2	2	12	—	—	—	—	—
2013–14	Idaho Steelheads	ECHL	70	4	28	32	95	11	0	1	1	14
2014–15	Idaho Steelheads	ECHL	59	2	13	15	76	6	1	0	1	4
2014–15	Springfield Falcons	AHL	3	0	0	0	4	—	—	—	—	—
2015–16	Missouri Mavericks	ECHL	33	3	5	8	30	5	0	0	0	2
2015–16	Bridgeport Sound Tigers	AHL	31	0	2	2	39	3	0	0	0	4
2016–17	Bridgeport Sound Tigers	AHL	36	0	5	5	52	—	—	—	—	—
2016–17	Missouri Mavericks	ECHL	3	0	0	0	6	—	—	—	—	—
2017–18	Bridgeport Sound Tigers	AHL	23	0	2	2	36	—	—	—	—	—
2017–18	Worcester Railers	ECHL	12	0	0	0	6	—	—	—	—	—
AHL totals			168	1	20	21	214	3	0	0	0	4
