= Travis Ehrhardt =

Canadian hockey player

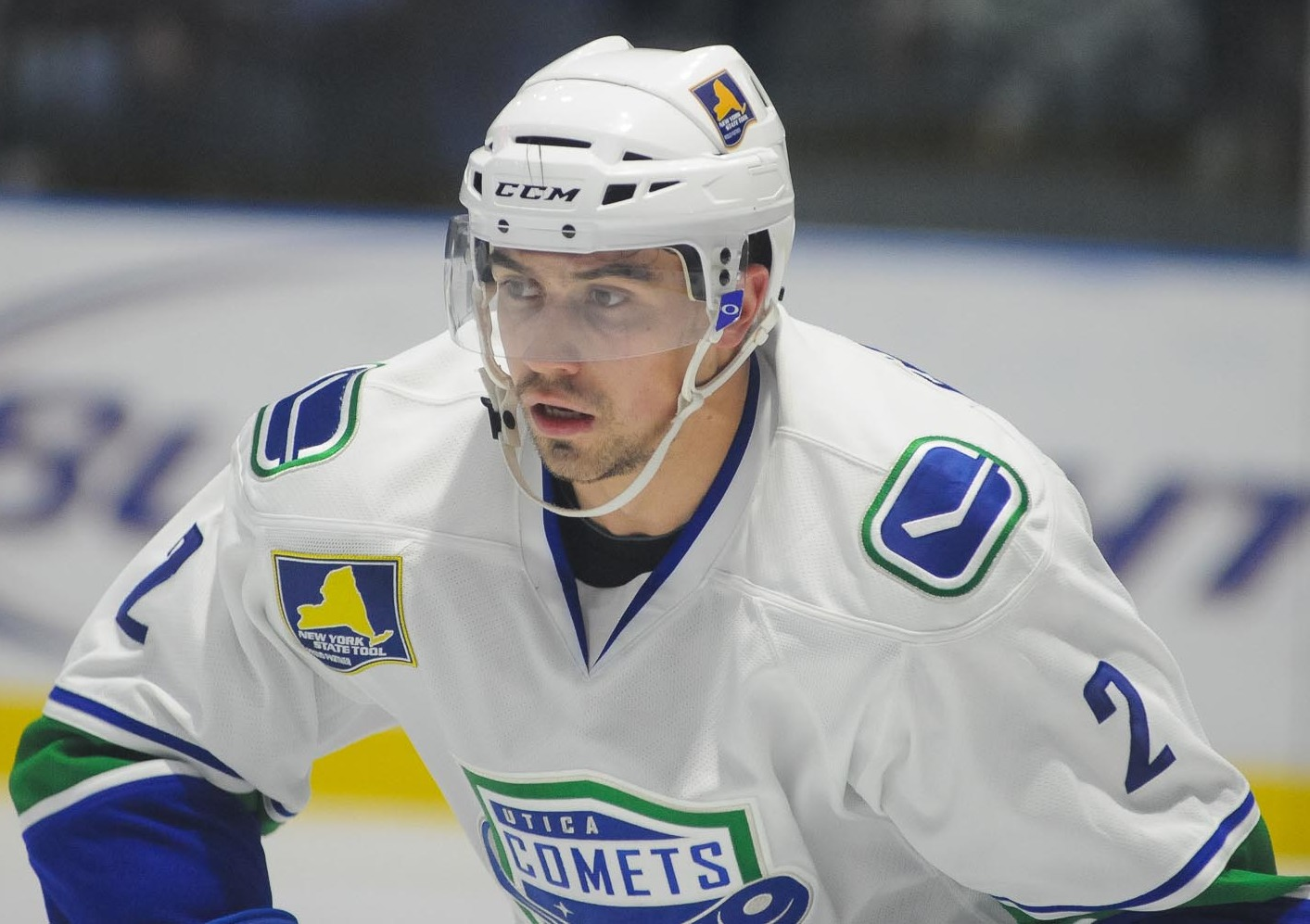
- Ehrhardt with the Utica Comets in 2014
- Born: April 12, 1989 (age 35); Calgary, Alberta, Canada
- Height: 5 ft 11 in (180 cm)
- Weight: 204 lb (93 kg; 14 st 8 lb)
- Position: Defence
- Shoots: Left
- Played for: Manitoba Moose; Grand Rapids Griffins; TPS; St. John's IceCaps; Stavanger Oilers; Utica Comets; Genève-Servette HC; KRS Heilongjiang; Glasgow Clan
- National team: Great Britain
- NHL draft: Undrafted
- Playing career: 2009–present

Travis Ehrhardt (born April 12, 1989) is a Canadian professional ice hockey defenceman who last played for Glasgow Clan in the Elite Ice Hockey League (EIHL).

== Playing career ==
Ehrhardt spent his Junior Ice Hockey career with the Moose Jaw Warriors and Portland Winter Hawks, both of the Western Hockey League.

At the end of the 2008-09 Western Hockey League season, Ehrhardt signed an Amateur Try-Out with the Manitoba Moose of the American Hockey League, for which he played 3 games during the 2008–09 season.

On July 6, 2009, Ehrhardt was signed as a free agent by the Detroit Red Wings to a three-year entry-level contract. During the duration of his contract with the Red Wings, Ehrnardt played for two of the team's minor league affiliates, the Grand Rapids Griffins of the American Hockey League and the Toledo Walleye of the ECHL.

Ehrhardt subsequently signed with TPS of the Finnish SM-liiga for the 2012-13 season.

During the 2013-14 season, Ehrhardt played for both the St. John's IceCaps of the American Hockey League and the Stavanger Oilers of the Norwegian GET-ligaen.

For the 2014–05 season, Ehrhardt joined the Utica Comets of the American Hockey League on a Professional Try-Out contract and was signed by the Comets to a Standard Player Contract on November 18, 2014.

On September 8, 2016, Ehrhardt was offered a PTO by Genève-Servette HC of the National League A. After a successful tryout, he was signed to a one-year contract by Geneve-Servette on September 11, 2016.

== Personal information ==
Travis' younger brother Dallas (born July 31, 1992) currently plays Hockey with the Manchester Storm of the Elite Ice Hockey League. He is a member of Great Britain men's national ice hockey team.

== Career statistics ==
=== Regular season and playoffs ===
			Regular season					Playoffs
Season	Team	League	GP	G	A	Pts	PIM	GP	G	A	Pts	PIM
2004–05	Moose Jaw Warriors	WHL	2	0	1	1	2	—	—	—	—	—
2005–06	Moose Jaw Warriors	WHL	45	1	10	11	37	18	0	2	2	18
2006–07	Moose Jaw Warriors	WHL	69	0	29	29	83	—	—	—	—	—
2007–08	Moose Jaw Warriors	WHL	18	3	9	12	27	—	—	—	—	—
2007–08	Portland Winter Hawks	WHL	54	7	22	29	53	—	—	—	—	—
2008–09	Portland Winter Hawks	WHL	68	9	28	37	109	—	—	—	—	—
2008–09	Manitoba Moose	AHL	3	0	0	0	0	—	—	—	—	—
2009–10	Grand Rapids Griffins	AHL	42	0	5	5	38	—	—	—	—	—
2009–10	Toledo Walleye	ECHL	3	1	1	2	0	—	—	—	—	—
2010–11	Grand Rapids Griffins	AHL	52	4	11	15	36	—	—	—	—	—
2011–12	Grand Rapids Griffins	AHL	41	1	6	7	25	—	—	—	—	—
2012–13	TPS	SM-l	17	0	0	0	16	—	—	—	—	—
2013–14	St. John's IceCaps	AHL	8	1	0	1	4	—	—	—	—	—
2013–14	Stavanger Oilers	GET	14	1	3	4	30	15	1	4	5	12
2014–15	Utica Comets	AHL	41	3	4	7	22	14	0	4	4	10
2015–16	Utica Comets	AHL	64	6	19	25	33	4	0	1	1	2
2016–17	Genève-Servette HC	NLA	25	0	4	4	8	—	—	—	—	—
2017–18	KRS Heilongjiang	VHL	37	6	12	18	68	—	—	—	—	—
2018–19	Glasgow Clan	EIHL	55	5	26	31	50	2	0	0	0	0
2019–20	Glasgow Clan	EIHL	44	6	18	24	42	—	—	—	—	—
AHL totals			251	15	45	60	158	18	0	5	5	12

=== International ===
Year	Team	Event	Result	GP	G	A	Pts	PIM
2006	Canada Pacific	WHC17	4th	6	0	0	0	6
2020	Great Britain	OGQ	DNQ	3	0	1	1	2
Junior totals				6	0	0	0	6
Senior totals				3	0	1	1	2
