= KVON =

- Napa, California; United States
- Broadcast area: Napa County; Sonoma County
- Frequency: 1440 kHz
- Branding: Mega Mix 1440/96.9

Programming
- Language: Spanish
- Format: Spanish AC

Ownership
- Owner: Wilfred Alexander Marcencia and Julissa Marcencia; (Wine Down Media LLC)
- Sister stations: KVYN

History
- First air date: November 17, 1947

Technical information
- Licensing authority: FCC
- Facility ID: 74430
- Class: B
- Power: 5,000 watts (day); 1,000 watts (night)
- Transmitter coordinates: 38°15′44.7″N 122°16′59.9″W
- Translator: 96.9 K245DK (Napa)

Links
- Public license information: Public file; LMS
- Webcast: Listen live
- Website: kvon.com

KVON (1440 AM) is a commercial radio station broadcasting a Spanish AC format. Licensed to Napa, California, United States, it serves the Napa County/Sonoma County region of Northern California. The station is owned by Wilfred Alexander Marcencia and Julissa Marcencia, through licensee Wine Down Media LLC.

KVON's transmitter is sited south of Napa, adjacent to the Napa River. The station is also relayed over low-power FM translator K245DK (96.9 FM).

== History ==
On November 17, 1947, KVON first signed on. Originally it broadcast with 500 watts of power around the clock, before getting a power increase. The station was owned by Thomas L. Young from 1971 to 1996. During Young's ownership, he founded sister station KVYN which went on the air in 1975.

In May 2017 an announcement was made that the station along with KVYN had been sold by Wine Country Broadcasting to Wine Down Media for $425,000. The transaction was consummated on August 1, 2017.

On December 14, 2021, KVON announced that it would flip to Spanish language programming on January 3, 2022, and some previous programming elements would move to sister station KVYN. The station is currently the only station in Napa County broadcasting in Spanish 24 hours a day, 7 days a week. The format is Spanish AC, branded as "Mega Mix 1440/96.9. The switchover to the new format is a culmination of a 5 year transition, bourne out of several events starting with the October 2017 Northern California wildfires, followed by the 2019 California power shutoffs and the COVID-19 pandemic. Over one third of Napa County's population is Latino and during these events, Spanish speaking residents had a difficult time retrieving and understanding coverage and implications of these events at the local level. The station's ownership was granted a license to broadcast by the FCC on December 8, 2021.
