= Ludwig Karlsson =

Swedish ice hockey player

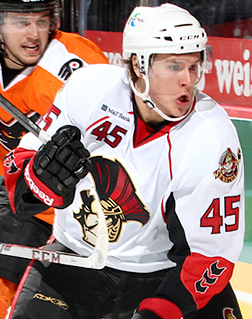
- Karlsson with the Binghamton Senators in 2013
- Born: 6 January 1991 (age 35) Stockholm, Sweden
- Height: 6 ft 3 in (191 cm)
- Weight: 210 lb (95 kg; 15 st 0 lb)
- Position: Right wing
- Shot: Left
- EIHL team Former teams: Milton Keynes Lightning; Binghamton Senators; Texas Stars
- NHL draft: Undrafted
- Playing career: 2013–2018

Ludwig Karlsson (born 6 January 1991) is a Swedish former professional Ice Hockey Forward. He started his career with the Ottawa Senators for a year before being traded to the Dallas Stars. After 3 years of playing in the US, he signed with IK Pantern of the HockeyAllsvenskan (Allsv). Karlsson finished his career in the UK playing for MK Lightning of the UK EIHL.

== Playing career ==
Karlsson played two season with the Green Bay Gamblers of the United States Hockey League (2009–2011), scoring a total of 70 points (24 goals). In his first season with the Gamblers, Karlsson helped the team win the Clark Cup and in the second season the team again reached the Clark Cup Final. Prior to playing for the Gamblers, Karlsson spent time playing for the J18 and J20 squads of the Swedish club Linköpings HC, along with the Swedish National U16, U17, and U18 teams.

In 2011 Karlsson joined the Northeastern Huskies. In his Freshman year, Karlsson was the Huskies' leading scorer with 10 goals and 16 assists. Limited to 17 games due to season-ending injury in his Sophomore year, he scored five goals and three assists in his last season at Northeastern University. In July 2013 the Ottawa Senators of the NHL announced they had signed Karlsson to a two-year entry-level contract. During the 2013–14 season, Karlsson played 8 games with the Binghamton Senators, Ottawa's American Hockey League (AHL) affiliate, recording no Points, and 39 games with the Elmira Jackals of the ECHL, recording 11 goals and 13 assists. On 1 July 2014, Karlsson was traded, along with Jason Spezza, from the Senators to the Dallas Stars in exchange for Alex Chiasson, Nick Paul, Alex Guptill, and a second round draft pick in the 2015 NHL entry draft.

After opening 2014–15 training camp with Dallas, the team assigned Karlsson to the Texas Stars, its AHL affiliate. Karlsson started off the 2014–15 season splitting time in Dallas' minor league system, playing for both the Texas Stars and the Idaho Steelheads of the ECHL. On 12 March 2015, the Dallas Stars reassigned both Karlsson and Troy Vance from the Steelheads to the Missouri Mavericks of the ECHL as part of a deal in which the Mavericks traded Martin Lee and future considerations to the Steelheads.

Having left the Stars organization at the conclusion of his entry-level contract, Karlsson opted to remain in the ECHL, signing a one-year deal with the Orlando Solar Bears on 6 August 2015. Before appearing in a game with the Solar Bears in the 2015–16 season, Karlsson was traded for future considerations to the Colorado Eagles on 26 October 2015.

At the conclusion of his entry-level contract, and failing to establish himself in the professional ranks, Karlson was not tendered a qualifying offer to remain with the Stars. As a free agent, Karlsson opted to return to his native Sweden, signing a one-year deal with second division club, IK Pantern of the HockeyAllsvenskan on 28 April 2016.

After a spell in Sweden, Karlsson moved to the UK in the summer of 2017 to sign for MK Lightning ahead of their inaugural EIHL season.

Karlsson suffered an unusual amount of injuries throughout his professional career. In 2018 Karlsson suffered a season-ending compound fracture in his wrist, after which he retired.
