= Wes Cunningham (ice hockey) =

Canadian professional ice hockey player

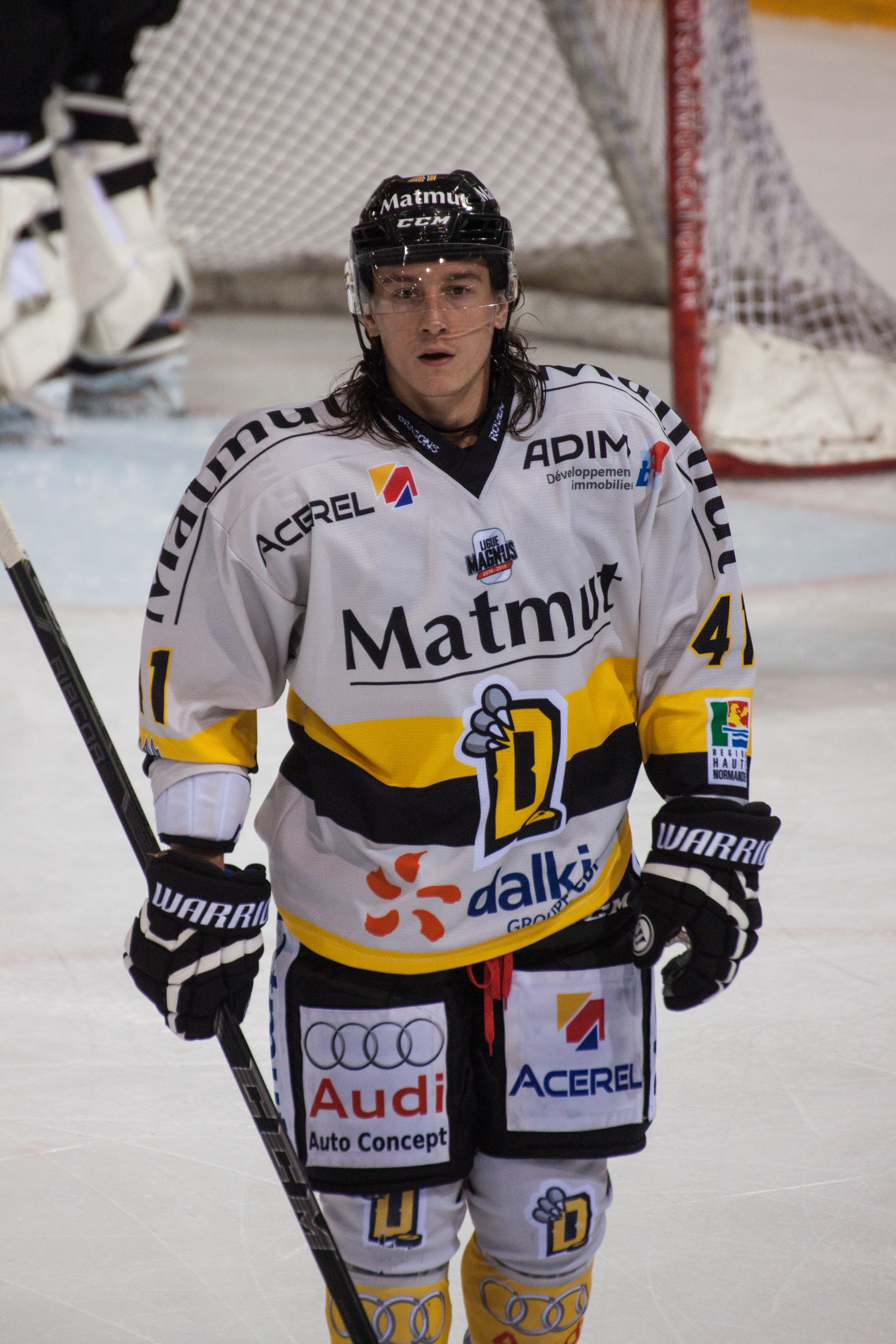
- the player in 2014
- Born: March 9, 1987 (age 38) Dresden, Ontario, Canada
- Height: 5 ft 12 in (183 cm)
- Weight: 174 lb (79 kg; 12 st 6 lb)
- Position: Defence
- Shoots: Left
- Erste Liga team Former teams: MAC Budapest; Tulsa Oilers; Norfolk Admirals; Bridgeport Sound Tigers; Lørenskog IK; Dragons de Rouen
- NHL draft: Undrafted
- Playing career: 2008–present

Wes Cunningham (born March 9, 1987) is a Canadian professional ice hockey player. He is currently playing with the MAC Budapest in the Erste Liga.

== Playing career ==
Undrafted and following a season of play in Norway, Cunningham returned to North America to play the 2013–14 season in the ECHL with the Bakersfield Condors.

On July 1, 2014, Cunningham was signed by Dragons de Rouen to play the 2014–15 season in the French Ligue Magnus.

On August 19, 2015, Cunningham again returned to America as a free agent, signing a one-year ECHL contract with the Missouri Mavericks.

== Awards and honours ==
- All-ECHL First Team (2010–11)
