= KVYN =

- Saint Helena, California; United States
- Broadcast area: Napa Valley; Wine Country
- Frequency: 99.3 MHz
- Branding: 99.3 The Vine

Programming
- Format: Adult album alternative (AAA)

Ownership
- Owner: Will Marcencia and Julissa Marcencia; (Wine Down Media LLC)
- Sister stations: KVON

History
- First air date: 1975

Technical information
- Licensing authority: FCC
- Facility ID: 74429
- Class: A
- ERP: 6,000 watts
- HAAT: 79 meters (259 ft)
- Transmitter coordinates: 38°25′33.6″N 122°19′36.0″W
- Translator: 103.5 K278AH (Calistoga)
- Repeater: 99.3 KVYN-FM1 (Cordelia)

Links
- Public license information: Public file; LMS
- Webcast: Listen live
- Website: 993thevine.com

KVYN (99.3 FM) is a commercial radio station licensed to Saint Helena, California, United States, serving the Napa Valley and Wine Country of Northern California. The station broadcasts an adult album alternative (AAA) format and is owned by licensee Wine Down Media LLC. The studios are located in Napa while the transmitter is sited off Silverado Trail in Yountville.

== History ==
Station's former logo

The station was founded by Thomas L. Young and initially signed on the air in 1975.

In May 2017 an announcement was made that the station along with sister station KVON had been sold by Wine Country Broadcasting to Wine Down Media. The transaction was consummated on August 1, 2017.

== Translator station ==
The station is also heard in Calistoga, California, through an FM translator at 103.5 MHz.

Broadcast translator for KVYN
Call sign	Frequency	City of license	FID	ERP (W)	HAAT	Class	FCC info
K278AH	103.5 FM	Calistoga, California	84736	80	−186 m (−610 ft)	D	LMS
