= Ben Meisner =

- Born: June 3, 1938; Maryfield, Saskatchewan
- Died: April 2, 2015 (aged 76); Winnipeg, Manitoba

Ben Meisner (June 3, 1938 – April 2, 2015) was a Canadian radio broadcaster.

Meisner was born in Maryfield, Saskatchewan in 1938, the youngest of the four children of William Meisner and Anna Wolowska. In the early 1950s he moved to Winnipeg, where he worked as an office boy for the United Grain Growers. He began his career in broadcasting at radio station CKDM in the 1950s in Dauphin, Manitoba. Eventually, he settled in Prince George, British Columbia, and became known as the "Voice of the North".

Meisner hosted the Meisner Program on radio station CKPG for more than twenty years. He was known for his sign-off "and that's one man's opinion".

After leaving radio in the fall of 2004, he launched an independent online news site, www.250News.com.

In the 1990s, Meisner became a prominent opponent of the Kemano Completion Project, which he argued would damage salmon stocks in the Nechako River. In 2003, he was one of the principal organizers of a huge rally in Prince George for improvement of health care in northern British Columbia which led to the creation of the Northern Medical Program at the University of Northern British Columbia.

Meisner's honours included a Lifetime Achievement Award from the Radio and TV News Directors' Association of Canada, the Queen's Golden Jubilee Medal in 2002, and Queen's Diamond Jubilee Medal in 2012. In 2010, the Province of British Columbia appointed him as a non-lawyer Bencher to the Law Society of British Columbia, to represent the public's interest on the BC Law Society's Board of Governors. The Law Society of British Columbia honoured him with the distinction of the title of Lifetime Bencher status in late March 2015.

While on an ice fishing trip to Manitoba in the spring of 2015, Meisner fell ill and was transferred to the Health Sciences Centre in Winnipeg. He was diagnosed with a rare form of cancer, which claimed his life in the early morning of April 2, 2015.
