= David Chau =

American options trader

- Born: 1993 (age 32–33)
- Other name: Captain Condor
- Occupation: Options trader
- Years active: 2020–2025
- Employer: SPX MGMT LLC
- Organization: InsideOptions
- Known for: Iron condor options trading strategy collapse, which resulted in losses of over $50 million

David Chau (born c. 1993), also known as Captain Condor, is an American former options trader and founder of the financial education platform InsideOptions. He is also the founder and manager of the hedge fund SPX Program Fund LP, operating under SPX MGMT. He is known for taking large, high-risk options positions using the iron condor strategy, including a reported $50 million loss in December 2025.

== Early life and education ==
Chau was born in 1993 in Sacramento, California, where he was raised. He is the child of Vietnamese immigrants who came to the United States following the Vietnam War. He attended John F. Kennedy High School and later graduated from McClatchy High School in Sacramento. Chau subsequently attended the University of California, Santa Cruz, where he studied before dropping out to pursue a career in trading and entrepreneurship.

== Career ==
Chau began his career as a trader before focusing on options trading, specializing in non-directional strategies such as the iron condor.

In 2020, Chau launched InsideOptions, a subscription-based online trading community. The group became known for executing large, high-risk iron condor positions, often combined with the martingale betting strategy. Trades primarily involved high-volume S&P 500 index options, at times large enough to affect market conditions.

In 2023, Chau founded SPX Program Fund LP.

=== Iron condor strategy collapse ===
In December 2025, Chau and the InsideOptions community incurred significant losses from an overleveraged iron condor strategy combined with martingale position sizing. Leading up to the Christmas holiday, the group repeatedly increased position sizes as the S&P 500 moved outside their target range. On December 24, the S&P 500 moved to push the position beyond its profitable range. Although the trades generated approximately $13 million in premium, they resulted in a maximum net loss.

Following the liquidation, Chau paused public trading activity and stated he was updating his probability-based trading models. Many of his subscribers were wiped out, with some claiming they lost their life savings.
