= Southern California Amateur Hockey Association =

The Southern California Amateur Hockey Association (SCAHA) is the governing body for competitive and developmental youth hockey on Southern California and is sanctioned by the California Amateur Hockey Association as part of USA Hockey.

The association was formed in 1974 and officially lists 22 member hockey clubs. SCAHA is the largest youth hockey league in the Western United States.

== SCAHA Leadership ==
SCAHA Executive Committee:

- Sandy Blumberg, Commissioner
- John Siberstein, Deputy Commissioner
- Jaime Campbell, Director of Manager
- Kevin Culbertson, Director at Large
- Bob Driffill, Treasurer
- Nancy Hodge, Ace Coaching Coordinator
- Rosemary Voulelikas, Secretary

SCAHA Staff:

- Chris Carcerano, Ice Convener
- Annie Fisher, Statistician
- Wendy Goldstein, Director of Member Services

== 2009–2010 season ==
For the 2009–2010 season, 22 clubs are participating in competition ranging from the Mite through Midget levels.

A total of 156 teams are competing under to auspices of SCAHA — with 37 at the tier level and another 119 at the developmental travel level. There are seven exhibition teams, five for the Lady Ducks and two Select Girls teams.

The teams compete in one of the following playing levels: Mite, Squirt B, Squirt A, PeeWee B, PeeWee A, PeeWee AA, Bantam B, Bantam A, Bantam AA, Midget 16U A, Midget 16U AA, Midget 18U A, Midget 18U AA.

== 2018–2019 season ==
Since the 2009–2010 season, there has been minimal change in Southern California Hockey up until the latest season. Most of the teams from the list below remain in some form still active. With edits to playing rules that have heavily opposed the ones of the Northern California Amateur Hockey Association, SOCAL has had a predominant role in youth California hockey. Some of the changes that have happened in the playing rules and league changes have been caused by the parent organization CAHA (California Amateur Hockey Association) and their parent organization USA Hockey. Most of rule changes since 2010 have involved a further emphasis on cross ice (using only one zone of the three on the ice to play a game of hockey, this is used mostly in the younger age groups) games for the Mite divisions. Also, there have been further divisions made in how they manage players of different skill levels. In 2010, they had some clubs and age groups that would have the AA division as their highest level of hockey. Some clubs, as of this moment only the Jr. Ducks and Jr. Kings, have included the international AAA division for players who are taking a more serious approach to hockey and are aiming at professional play. However, since only two clubs offer this division AAA travel internationally to play other teams and do not compete at the local level. More it terms of being local, the AA division is offered by a handful of clubs in SOCAL and although they also compete internationally, they do it far less than the AAA teams. Instead, they compete at the statewide level against other SOCAL AA teams as well as AA teams from NORCAL (Northern California Amateur Hockey Association). The A and B divisions used to be the only local divisions, in which SOCAL teams only against each other and the same for NORCAL teams. Now, there has been a new division added; BB, which is intended to serve as an intermediary for teams unskilled enough in the A division but are overly skilled for the B divisions. All three of them play weekly local games in their respected division, but the top two teams from NORCAL and top two teams from SOCAL will face off in the CAHA state championships, the only non localized games in these divisions that go on during the season. All of the listed hockey divisions go on tournaments, in which they travel to another location to play teams from other states and occasionally other countries. The prime example of a tournament of teams from different US States and Canadian Provinces is the International Silver Stick. Often, multi rink facilities or separate rinks will host tournaments as well. The most common SOCAL hosted tournaments are located in Riverside, Los Angeles, Anaheim, San Diego, and Valencia. Since these tournaments are either meant for AA or AAA teams, for them it is a part of their regular season. For the A, BB, and B teams, these tournaments are an entirely different form of competition so they usually temporarily merge into the SOCAL league.

== Participating clubs ==
- Anaheim Jr. Ducks
- Bakersfield Condors
- Bay Harbor Red Wings
- California Golden Bears
- California Heat
- California Wave
- California Jr Reign
- Goldrush Hockey Club
- Los Angeles Jr. Kings
- OC Hockey Club
- Ontario Moose
- Pasadena Maple Leafs
- San Diego Jr. Gulls
- San Diego Ice Arena Hockey Club
- San Diego Saints
- Ventura Mariners

Empire hockey club

== Participating Rinks ==
The list of rinks are as of August 2022.

- Aliso Viejo Ice Palace
- Bakersfield Ice Sports Center
- Carlsbad Ice Center
- East West Ice Palace
- Great Park Ice & Fivepoint Arena
- Ice in Paradise
- Ice Town Riverside
- Iceoplex - Simi Valley
- KHS ICE
- Kroc Center Ice Arena
- LA Kings Valley Ice Center
- Lake Forest Ice Palace
- Mechanics Bank Arena
- Ontario Center Ice Arena
- Ontario Ice Skating Center
- Paramount Iceland
- Pasadena Skating Center
- Pickwick Ice Arena
- Poway Ice Arena
- San Diego Ice Arena
- Skating Edge Ice Center
- The Cube Santa Clarita
- The Rinks: Anaheim ICE
- The Rinks: Lakewood ICE
- The Rinks: Westminster ICE
- The Rinks: Yorba Linda ICE
- Toyota Arena
- Toyota Sports Performance Center
- UTC La Jolla
