= Tony DeHart =

American ice hockey player

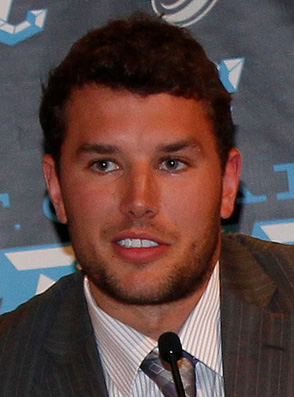
- DeHart with the St. Charles Chill in 2013
- Born: March 20, 1990 (age 36) Ballwin, Missouri, U.S.
- Height: 6 ft 2 in (188 cm)
- Weight: 202 lb (92 kg; 14 st 6 lb)
- Position: Defense
- Shot: Right
- Played for: Springfield Falcons; HC Eppan Pirates
- NHL draft: 125th overall, 2010; New York Islanders
- Playing career: 2010–2015

Tony DeHart (born March 20, 1990) is a retired American professional ice hockey defenseman. His final competitive appearance was with HC Eppan Pirates, who competed in Serie A at the time. DeHart was drafted by the New York Islanders in the fifth round, 125th overall, of the 2010 NHL entry draft.

== Playing career ==
DeHart developed his early hockey skills while competing in Junior Hockey within the Ontario Hockey League (OHL). During his time in the OHL, he played for two well-known teams: the London Knights and the Oshawa Generals.

In the 2011-12 season, DeHart appeared in 46 games for the Stockton Thunder in the ECHL. He was re-signed by the Stockton on July 12, 2012, to return for the 2012-13 season.

On July 2, 2013, DeHart became one of the first three players to sign with the newly formed St. Charles Chill of the Central Hockey League. During the 2013-14 season, he appeared in only 10 games for the Chill before joining the ECHL's Florida Everblades on December 2, 2013.

DeHart signed with the ECHL's Gwinnett Gladiators on August 13, 2014. However, on October 15, 2014, before appearing in a regular season game, he was released by the team.

DeHart signed with the Missouri Mavericks of the ECHL on November 11, 2014. However, the following day, before making his debut, the Mavericks suspended him.

After being suspended by the Mavericks before playing a single game, DeHart sought to continue his professional hockey career overseas. He signed with HC Eppan Pirates, a club competing in Serie A, Italy's top professional ice hockey league at the time.
