= Jared Brown =

American football player (born 1973)

Profile
- Position: Quarterback

Personal information
- Born: April 27, 1973 (age 53)
- Listed height: 6 ft 2 in (1.88 m)
- Listed weight: 215 lb (98 kg)

Career information
- High school: Kennedy (Sacramento, California)
- College: Sacramento CC (1991–1992); UNLV (1993–1995)
- NFL draft: 1996: undrafted

Career history
- San Jose SaberCats (1998)

Career AFL statistics
- Comp. / Att.: 31 / 56
- Passing yards: 454
- TD–INT: 6–2
- QB rating: 93.90
- Stats at ArenaFan.com

Jared Brown (born April 27, 1973) is an American former professional football quarterback who played one season with the San Jose SaberCats of the Arena Football League. He played college football at Sacramento City College and the University of Nevada, Las Vegas.

== Early life ==
Jared Brown was born on April 27, 1973. He attended John F. Kennedy High School in Sacramento, California.

== College career ==
Brown was a two-year starter at Sacramento City College from 1991 to 1992. He led the Sacramento City Panthers to a 9–0–1 regular season record in 1992 while passing for 2,750 yards and 26 touchdowns. He was named a first-team All-American by the California Community College Football Coaches Association for his performance during the 1992 season.

Brown transferred to the play for the UNLV Rebels of the University of Nevada, Las Vegas in 1993. He suffered a knee injury that required surgery and missed the 1993 season. He was then a two-year letterman from 1994 to 1995. He played in eight games, starting five, in 1994, completing 102 of 209 passes (48.8%) for 1,154 yards, five touchdowns, and eight interceptions while also rushing for 15 yards and a touchdown. Brown appeared in 11 games during his senior year in 1995, recording 147 completions on 304 passing attempts (48.4%) for 1,783 yards, 13 touchdowns, and 17 interceptions. He also rushed for 284 yards and five touchdowns as a senior.

== Professional career ==
Brown played in seven games for the San Jose SaberCats of the Arena Football League in 1998, completing 31 of 56 passes (55.4%) for 454 yards, six touchdowns, and two interceptions.
