= 2015–16 ECHL season =

Ice hockey league season

- League: ECHL
- Sport: Ice hockey
- Duration: October 16, 2015 – April 9, 2016

Regular season
- Brabham Cup: Missouri Mavericks
- Season MVP: Chad Costello (Allen)
- Top scorer: Chad Costello (Allen)

Playoffs
- Playoffs MVP: Chad Costello (Allen)

Kelly Cup
- Champions: Allen Americans
- Runners-up: Wheeling Nailers

ECHL seasons
- 2014–15 2016–17

The 2015–16 ECHL season was the 28th season of the ECHL. The regular season schedule ran from October 16, 2015 to April 9, 2016 with the Kelly Cup playoffs to follow. Twenty-eight teams in 21 states and one Canadian province each played a 72-game schedule. The league alignment was significantly altered before the season when the American Hockey League announced the formation of a Pacific Division on January 30, 2015 displacing the ECHL teams that had been in California markets.

== League business ==
=== Team changes ===
As part of a massive market swap with the American Hockey League, the three California based ECHL franchises moved east into markets that the AHL had vacated.

- The Bakersfield Condors relocated to Norfolk, Virginia to become the Norfolk Admirals. Norfolk hosted an AHL team of the same name the previous season. The Condors' franchise was purchased by their National Hockey League affiliate, the Edmonton Oilers, which replaced the Condors with team of the same name to play in the AHL.
- The Ontario Reign relocated to Manchester, New Hampshire to become the Manchester Monarchs, replacing an AHL team of the same name. As both the Reign and Monarchs, in both their AHL and ECHL incarnations, are under the same ownership structure in the Los Angeles Kings organization, this move effectively amounts to the two franchises trading names.
- The Stockton Thunder relocated to Glens Falls, New York to become the Adirondack Thunder, replacing the Adirondack Flames of the AHL who were relocated to Stockton. The Thunder were purchased by ownership group of the NHL's Calgary Flames, who already owned the Adirondack Flames, and the Thunder then become affiliated with their new AHL team, the Stockton Heat.

Two South Division teams changed names to reflect their regions:

- The Greenville, South Carolina, franchise, formerly known as the Road Warriors, changed its name to the Greenville Swamp Rabbits, a reference to the Swamp Rabbit Trail in the city.
- The Duluth, Georgia, franchise, formerly known as the Gwinnett Gladiators, changed its name to the Atlanta Gladiators to reflect the Atlanta metropolitan area instead of just Gwinnett County.

=== Conference realignment ===
Due to the relocation of the former Californian franchises, the league's conference alignment was significantly altered. ECHL brought back the Midwest and South Divisions to increase the number of divisions from four to six, whereas the number of teams per division was reduced from seven to either four or five.

With fewer teams on the Pacific coast, the former Pacific Division was renamed as the West Division. The Central division lost three teams: Rapid City to the West, Brampton to the North, and Quad City to the Midwest. Former North Division teams Cincinnati, Evansville, Fort Wayne and Indy joined Quad City in the new Midwest Division.

All former East Division teams except Elmira and Reading are realigned to the new South Division with the relocated teams Adirondack, Manchester and Norfolk being placed in the East Division.

=== Affiliation changes ===
For the 2015–16 season, all 28 ECHL teams are only allowed to have a single affiliation with an NHL team leading to many affiliation changes.

ECHL team	New affiliates	Former affiliates
Adirondack Thunder (formerly Stockton)	Calgary Flames (NHL); Stockton Heat (AHL)	New York Islanders (NHL); Bridgeport Sound Tigers (AHL)
Alaska Aces*	Independent	Minnesota Wild (NHL); St. Louis Blues (NHL); Iowa Wild (AHL)
Allen Americans	San Jose Barracuda (AHL)	Worcester Sharks (AHL)
Atlanta Gladiators (formerly Gwinnett)	Boston Bruins (NHL); Providence Bruins (AHL)	Arizona Coyotes (NHL); Portland Pirates (AHL)
Brampton Beast	Montreal Canadiens (NHL); St. John's IceCaps (AHL)	Unaffiliated
Cincinnati Cyclones*		Florida Panthers (NHL); San Antonio Rampage (AHL)
Colorado Eagles	Independent	Calgary Flames (NHL); Adirondack Flames (AHL)
Florida Everblades*		Tampa Bay Lightning (NHL); Syracuse Crunch (AHL)
Fort Wayne Komets	San Antonio Rampage (AHL)	Lake Erie Monsters (AHL)
Kalamazoo Wings*	Lake Erie Monsters (AHL)	Vancouver Canucks (NHL); Chicago Wolves (AHL); Springfield Falcons (AHL); Utica Comets (AHL)
Manchester Monarchs* (formerly Ontario)	Ontario Reign (AHL)	Winnipeg Jets (NHL); Manchester Monarchs (AHL); St. John's IceCaps (AHL)
Missouri Mavericks	New York Islanders (NHL); Bridgeport Sound Tigers (AHL)	Chicago Wolves (AHL)
Norfolk Admirals (formerly Bakersfield)	Bakersfield Condors (AHL)	Oklahoma City Barons (AHL)
Rapid City Rush	Arizona Coyotes (NHL); Springfield Falcons (AHL)	Unaffiliated
South Carolina Stingrays*		Boston Bruins (NHL); Providence Bruins (AHL)
Tulsa Oilers	Winnipeg Jets (NHL); Manitoba Moose (AHL)	Unaffiliated
Utah Grizzlies	San Diego Gulls (AHL)	Norfolk Admirals (AHL)
Wheeling Nailers*		Montreal Canadiens (NHL); Hamilton Bulldogs (AHL)

* – indicates team previously had multiple NHL/AHL affiliations and were dropped due to the new single affiliation rule

=== Annual Board of Governors meeting ===
The annual ECHL Board of Governors meeting was held at the Monte Carlo Resort and Casino in Las Vegas, Nevada, in June 2015. The ECHL Board of Governors unanimously elected Cincinnati Cyclones' president Ray Harris as chairman replacing Atlanta Gladiators' president Steve Chapman who had served as chairman for the previous seven seasons. The Board also approved of several rule changes including the change to a 3-on-3 overtime for the full five-minute duration. If still tied after overtime the shootout is decreased to three shooters per side before entering the "sudden death" format.

It was later announced that league owners voted unanimously that all 28 ECHL franchises should only allow for a single affiliation with a parent NHL team in order to give an opportunity for previously unaffiliated teams (such as those added from the Central Hockey League in 2014) to gain NHL prospects.

=== 2016 CCM/ECHL Hockey Heritage Week ===
As in 2012 and 2014, the ECHL will not have a traditional All-Star Game. Instead, they will hold a Hockey Heritage Week hosted by the Kalamazoo Wings at the Wings Event Center in the city of Kalamazoo, Michigan from February 1–6, 2016. The week's theme is Past, Present, and Future and includes Hall of Fame exhibits, K-Wings throwback jerseys, alumni reunions, a youth hockey showcase, and two games between the Wings and the Toledo Walleye.

=== 2016 Kelly Cup Playoffs format ===
At the end of the regular season the top team in each division will qualify for the 2016 Kelly Cup Playoffs and be seeded either 1, 2, or 3 based on highest point total earned in the season. Then the five non-division winning teams with the highest point totals in each conference will qualify for the playoffs and be seeded 4 through 8. The Kelly Cup final will pit the Eastern Conference champion against the Western Conference champion. All four rounds will be a best-of-seven format.

== Standings ==
Final standings.

Eastern Conference

East Division	GP	W	L	OTL	SOL	GF	GA	PTS
y – Manchester Monarchs (LA)	72	39	24	4	5	222	213	87
x – Adirondack Thunder (CGY)	72	38	28	2	4	197	189	82
x – Reading Royals (PHI)	72	36	26	6	4	222	194	82
Elmira Jackals (BUF)	72	37	30	3	2	206	214	79
Norfolk Admirals (EDM)	72	30	37	4	1	201	232	65

North Division	GP	W	L	OTL	SOL	GF	GA	PTS
y – Toledo Walleye (DET)	72	47	20	2	3	225	174	99
x – Wheeling Nailers (PIT)	72	37	26	5	4	214	211	83
x – Kalamazoo Wings (CBJ)	72	38	28	5	1	233	230	82
Brampton Beast (MTL)	72	23	38	7	4	179	255	57

South Division	GP	W	L	OTL	SOL	GF	GA	PTS
y – South Carolina Stingrays (WSH)	72	44	18	7	3	224	162	98
x – Florida Everblades (CAR)	72	46	23	1	2	226	175	95
Orlando Solar Bears (TOR)	72	33	30	4	5	224	232	75
Atlanta Gladiators (BOS)	72	34	31	5	2	189	224	75
Greenville Swamp Rabbits (NYR)	72	29	33	9	1	205	243	68

Western Conference

Midwest Division	GP	W	L	OTL	SOL	GF	GA	PTS
y – Fort Wayne Komets (COL)	72	40	23	7	2	240	200	89
x – Cincinnati Cyclones (NSH)	72	36	27	5	4	222	210	81
x – Quad City Mallards (MIN)	72	37	29	4	2	203	203	80
Indy Fuel (CHI)	72	32	36	4	0	174	201	68
Evansville IceMen (OTT)	72	29	33	7	3	207	242	68

Central Division	GP	W	L	OTL	SOL	GF	GA	PTS
z – Missouri Mavericks (NYI)	72	52	15	3	2	234	162	109
x – Allen Americans (SJ)	72	41	24	3	4	222	204	89
Tulsa Oilers (WPG)	72	37	30	3	2	191	191	79
Wichita Thunder (Ind.)	72	18	41	7	6	150	240	49

West Division	GP	W	L	OTL	SOL	GF	GA	PTS
y – Colorado Eagles (Ind.)	72	41	27	3	1	232	193	86
x – Idaho Steelheads (DAL)	72	38	24	7	3	203	187	86
x – Utah Grizzlies (ANA)	72	39	27	3	3	223	206	84
Rapid City Rush (ARZ)	72	30	35	3	4	177	210	67
Alaska Aces (Ind.)	72	27	38	4	3	189	237	61

x - clinched playoff spot, y - clinched regular season division title, z - Brabham Cup (regular season) champion

== Statistical leaders ==
=== Scoring leaders ===
The following players are sorted by points, then goals.

GP = Games played; G = Goals; A = Assists; Pts = Points; PIM = Penalty minutes

Player	Team	GP	G	A	Pts	PIM
Chad Costello	Allen Americans	72	24	79	103	36
Trent Daavettila	Colorado Eagles	71	25	55	80	26
Shawn Szydlowski	Fort Wayne Komets	62	25	50	75	82
Riley Brace	Wheeling Nailers	56	26	41	67	76
Shane Berschbach	Toledo Walleye	61	24	43	67	6
Matt Willows	Florida Everblades	71	23	43	66	25
Jack Downing	Cincinnati Cyclones	72	32	32	64	27
Ludwig Blomstrand	Kalamazoo Wings	71	29	34	63	42
Peter Sivák	Fort Wayne/Alaska	61	22	41	63	35
Derek Nesbitt	Atlanta Gladiators	72	28	34	62	20
David Pacan	South Carolina Stingrays	69	20	42	62	43
Charles Sarault	Utah Grizzlies	67	19	43	62	32

=== Leading goaltenders ===
GP = Games played; TOI = Time on ice (in minutes); SA = Shots against; GA = Goals against; SO = Shutouts; GAA = Goals against average; SV% = Save percentage; W = Wins; L = Losses; OTL = Overtime/shootout loss

Player	Team	GP	TOI	SA	GA	SO	GAA	SV%	W	L	OTL
Jack Campbell	Idaho Steelheads	20	1211	606	34	4	1.68	.944	14	5	1
Josh Robinson	Missouri Mavericks	32	1884	849	59	2	1.88	.931	28	2	1
Brad Thiessen	Cincinnati Cyclones	19	1113	528	35	1	1.89	.934	10	4	4
Vítek Vaněček	South Carolina Stingrays	32	1867	760	63	4	2.03	.917	18	7	6
Martin Ouellette	Reading Royals	31	1797	807	63	4	2.10	.922	17	10	3

== Postseason ==
Conference quarterfinals	Conference semifinals
E1	Toledo Walleye	3
E8	Reading Royals	4
E8	Reading	3
E5	Wheeling	4
E4	Florida Everblades	2
E5	Wheeling Nailers	4
Eastern Conference
E2	South Carolina Stingrays	4
E7	Kalamazoo Wings	1
E2	South Carolina	4
E6	Adirondack	3
E3	Manchester Monarchs	1
E6	Adirondack Thunder	4
W1	Missouri Mavericks	4
W8	Quad City Mallards	0
W1	Missouri	2
W4	Allen	4
W4	Allen Americans	4
W5	Idaho Steelheads	3
Western Conference
W2	Fort Wayne Komets	4
W7	Cincinnati Cyclones	3
W2	Fort Wayne	4
W6	Utah	0
W3	Colorado Eagles	2
W6	Utah Grizzlies	4

Conference finals
E5	Wheeling	4
E2	South Carolina	3
W4	Allen	4
W2	Fort Wayne	1

Kelly Cup finals
E5	Wheeling	2
W4	Allen	4

== Awards ==
Award	Winner
Patrick Kelly Cup:	Allen Americans
Henry Brabham Cup:	Missouri Mavericks
Gingher Memorial Trophy:	Wheeling Nailers
Bruce Taylor Trophy:	Allen Americans
John Brophy Award:	Richard Matvichuk, Missouri Mavericks
CCM Most Valuable Player:	Chad Costello, Allen Americans
Kelly Cup Playoffs Most Valuable Player:	Chad Costello, Allen Americans
Warrior Hockey Goaltender of the Year:	Josh Robinson, Missouri Mavericks
CCM Rookie of the Year:	Matt Willows, Florida Everblades
CCM Defenseman of the Year:	Mathew Maione, Wheeling Nailers
Leading Scorer:	Chad Costello, Allen Americans
AMI Graphics Plus Performer Award:	Joey Leach, South Carolina Stingrays
Sportsmanship Award:	Shane Berschbach, Toledo Walleye
Community Service Award:	Rob Florentino, Florida Everblades
Birmingham Memorial Award:	Camden Nuckols and Oliver "Butch" Mousseaux

=== All-ECHL teams ===
All-First Team

- Josh Robinson (G) – Missouri Mavericks
- Mathew Maione (D) – Wheeling Nailers
- Adrian Veideman (D) – Colorado Eagles
- Shane Berschbach (F) – Toledo Walleye
- Chad Costello (F) – Allen Americans
- Trent Daavettila (F) – Colorado Eagles

All-Second Team

- Jeff Lerg (G) – Toledo Walleye
- Adam Comrie (D) – Reading Royals
- William Wrenn (D) – Alaska Aces
- Riley Brace (F) – Wheeling Nailers
- Jesse Root (F) – Missouri Mavericks
- Shawn Szydlowski (F) – Fort Wayne Komets

All-Rookie Team

- Vitek Vanecek (G) – South Carolina Stingrays
- Jacob MacDonald (D) – Elmira Jackals
- Ben Marshall (D) – Indy Fuel
- Dan DeSalvo (F) – Tulsa Oilers
- Cason Hohmann (F) – Elmira Jackals
- Matt Willows (F) – Florida Everblades

== See also ==
- ECHL All-Star Game
- List of ECHL seasons
- 2015 in sports
- 2016 in sports
