= 2007 World Junior A Challenge =

Tournament details
- Host country: Canada
- Venue(s): Cominco Arena in Trail, British Columbia, Nelson and District Community Complex in Nelson, British Columbia
- Dates: November 5, 2007 – November 11, 2007
- Teams: 6

Final positions
- Champions: Canada West (2nd title)
- Runners-up: Canada East
- Third place: United States
- Fourth place: Russia

Tournament statistics
- Games played: 13
- Scoring leader: (Canada) Mike Connolly (11 pts.)

Awards
- MVP: (Canada) Mike Connolly

The World Junior A Challenge 2007 was an international Junior "A" ice hockey tournament hosted by Hockey Canada. The 2007 World Junior A Challenge was hosted by the Canadian cities of Trail, British Columbia and Nelson, British Columbia from November 5 to November 11, 2007.

The exhibition games played prior to the tournament took place between November 1 and 3, in Trail, Nelson, and Castlegar, British Columbia, and Okotoks, Alberta. Extra teams taking part in the exhibition series included the Trail Smoke Eaters of the British Columbia Hockey League, Okotoks Oilers of the Alberta Junior Hockey League, and an all-star contingent from the Kootenay International Junior Hockey League.

Canada West defeated Canada East in the finals 4–1 to claim the gold medal. Team USA beat Russia 9–6 in the Bronze Medal Game to claim third place. Belarus defeated Germany 5–3 in the 5th Place Game the day before.

== 2007 Teams ==
Canada West is fresh off of winning the inaugural WJAC in 2006. The team will consist of players mostly from the BCHL and AJHL, but will also have representatives from the Saskatchewan Junior Hockey League, Manitoba Junior Hockey League, and Superior International Junior Hockey League.

Canada East was the 2006 WJAC runners-up. The team is headed by Jerome Dupont, head coach of the Royal Bank Cup 2007 National Champion Aurora Tigers. The team is composed mostly of players from the 35-team Ontario Provincial Junior A Hockey League, which operates more like four separate leagues during the regular season. The team will also have representatives from the Northern Ontario Junior Hockey League, Central Junior A Hockey League, Quebec Junior AAA Hockey League, and Maritime Junior A Hockey League.

The United States has entered the WJAC for the first time. Featuring a strong roster of undrafted Tier I Junior "A" players from the United States Hockey League, the USA had the potential to be a contender for the tournament's top prize.

Other teams in the tournament were Russia, Germany, and Belarus. Slovakia has opted out of the tournaments second year despite a fourth-place finish in 2006.

== Summary ==
=== Exhibition ===
Exhibition play started on November 1. A newly formed Canada West squad challenged the local Trail Smoke Eaters of the British Columbia Hockey League. Smoke Eaters almost created a massive upset against the defending WJAC champs, but fell short with a 2–1 loss to Canada West. The same night, the Canada East squad challenged the Junior "B" all-stars of the Kootenay International Junior Hockey League. The East squad came out flying in the first period but ran into the KIJHL's Creston Thundercats goaltender Wade Waters who only allowed one goal on sixteen shots in the first period. Despite being badly out-shot, the KIJHL all-stars kept it close, as Canada East only defeated them by a score of 4–1.

The next night began with the biggest shocker of the exhibition series. Canada West were embarrassed by Team Russia 6–1 in front of their hometown faithful. Going down 6–0 in the first forty minutes and allowing five goals in under ten minutes of play, Canada West did not play like the champions of the World Junior A Challenge 2006. The other game of the night saw the Okotoks Oilers of the Alberta Junior Hockey League host Team Germany. In a thrilling shootout style game, the Oilers came out on top with a 7–3 victory.

The final night of exhibition play started with Team Germany and Team Belarus squaring off. In a tight game, the Germans came out on top and beat the Belarusians by a score of 3–1. In the second game of the night, Canada East got their chance to gauge the talent level of Team Russia as the two teams squared off. The Canadians left the first period with a 1–0 lead, only to lose it early in the second. Facing a 2–1 deficit, the Canadians scored three straight goals in the second period and then held of a hungry Russian squad for the 4–3 victory.

=== Round robin ===
On November 5, day one of the tournament, Russia was pitted against Germany in Pool A and Canada East squared off against Belarus in Pool B. The Russians defeated the German squad by a score of 6–2. Belarus, much improved from last years WJAC, kept the game close against Canada East. In the end, the East capitalized at the right times and won the game by a score of 4–1.

Day two, November 6, proved to be an exciting game for American hockey fans. Pitted against the Belarusians, the American squad fell quickly behind in their first ever WJAC game. Down 4–1 in the second period, the Americans eventually rallied back to take a 6–5 lead. Belarus scored with less than three minutes left to force overtime. With five seconds left in overtime, Belarusian goaltender Valeriy Pronin lost a race for a loose puck against American Barry Almeida which resulted in an empty net game-winning goal for the US with seconds left in the frame. The other game of the night saw Canada West open their tournament against the German squad. The Canadians took out their pre-tournament frustration on the Germans and defeated them by a score of 7–2.

November 7, 2007 proved to be a disastrous day for both Canadian squads at the WJAC. Canada East met the American squad for the first time ever. The Americans scored first and the Canadians tied it up shortly after. They left the first period tied 1-1. The opposite occurred in the second period, and the second finished 2-2. The third was scoreless and the game ended up in sudden death overtime. Exactly halfway through the fourth frame, Barry Almeida of the American squad scored to win the contest. The goal was Almeida's second straight game-winning goal and overtime marker. Despite the tight score, the Americans were badly out shot. The final shots were 37-23 for Canada. Canada West had their opportunity to make up for their embarrassing exhibition loss to the Russians that night. After two periods, the Russians led the West squad by a score of 2–0 with goals from Filitov and Kugryshev. Early in the third, the West popped two quick goals from Lee and Ziegler to tie the game up. With less than two and a half minutes left, Grachev of the Russians scored to give Russia the lead. They scored an empty net goal to end the game 4–2. Canada West dominated the Russians with shots, 37–22.

Russia and the United States jump straight to the tournament semi-finals with their wins, while Canada East and Canada West are forced to play qualifier games against Germany and Belarus for the right to move on to the semi-finals.

=== Quarter-finals ===
On November 8, the quarter-finals took place at the WJAC. Canada East took on Team Germany. The Germans scored early in the game and held a 1–0 lead for most of the game. In the third period, the East scored four unanswered goals to defeat the German squad by a score of 4–1. In the other quarter-final, the Canada West squad played against the Belarusians. The West came up with an early 2–0 lead in the game. The Belarusians scored in the second to make it 2–1. Early in the third, Belarus tied the game at 2. Belarus started taking untimely penalties and Pittsburgh Penguins' prospect Casey Pierro-Zabotel scored a natural hat trick in only 4 minutes and 2 seconds. Two of Pierro-Zabotel's goals were on the power play and the three goals made the score 5–2. The game ended with a final score of 7-3 for Canada West and a series of serious penalties (gross misconducts and match penalties) for both squads. Canada East and Canada West moved on to the WJAC semi-finals, while Germany and Belarus will play in the 5th Place Match early on November 10.

=== Semi-finals and 5th Place ===
The "5th Place Match" occurred on November 10 between Germany and Belarus. The first period was scoreless. The second period saw the Belarusians score early, but were followed up by two German goals. In the third, the Belarusians came alive and outscored Germany 4–1 to win the game 5–3. Both teams are done for the tournament. The first semi-final was between Canada East and Russia. Jordon Watts scored a second period shorthanded marker to put Canada East up 1–0. Early in the third, the Russians answered back. Louke Oakley of Canada East scored on a late game penalty shot to win the game for the East and launch them into their second straight final. The second semi-final was between Canada West and the American squad. The West came out flying and ran away with a 4-1 first period lead. The West held off the Americans for the rest of the game and added an additional marker to win the game 5–1. The victory sets up an east–west rematch of last years WJAC and also Russia vying for their second straight bronze medal against the unpredictable Team USA.

=== Gold and Bronze ===
The Bronze Medal Game began at 2:00 PM PST on November 11. The game was between the Americans and the Russians. The Russians asserted dominance early, leaving the first period with a 2–0 lead. In the second, the Americans made it 2-1 early and the Russians came back to make it 3–1. After this, the Americans netted two quick ones to tie the game at three, only to have the Russians score more to close the period with a 5–3 lead. In the third period, the Americans again tied up the game with two quick goals. The Russians came back with seemingly the "comeback killer" to make it 6–5, but the Americans came alive and scored four unanswered goals to defeat the Russians 9–6. The American victory denies the Russians of their second straight bronze medal at the WJAC, and gives the Americans their first ever medal at their first WJAC.

The Gold Medal Game began at 7:30 PM PST. The game was a rematch between the two finalists of the 2006 WJAC, Canada East and Canada West. The East came out strong and took an early lead, but two tallies by the West late in the first period closed out the frame with the West leading 2–1. Joe Colborne scored 31 seconds into the second period to give the West a 3–1 lead which they held onto throughout the rest of the period. Halfway through the third period, the West put the final nail in the coffin as they scored to make it 4–1. With the win, the West has won the first two ever WJAC championships and the East has to settle for their second straight silver medal. The hero of the final was the West's Zac Dalpe who scored the tying goal, the winning goal, and the final goal to get a hat-trick and the game's most valuable player.

== Exhibition schedule ==
Exhibition Results
Game	Team	Score	Team	Score	Notes	Date - Time - Location
Ex1	Canada West	2	Trail Smoke Eaters	1	Final - Shots: 32-31 Can W	November 1, 2007 - 19:30 PST - Trail, BC
Ex2	Canada East	4	KIJHL All-Stars	1	Final - Shots: 40-22 Can E	November 1, 2007 - 19:30 PST - Nelson, BC
Ex3	Canada West	1	Russia	6	Final - Shots: 31 for Can W	November 2, 2007 - 19:30 PST - Nelson, BC
Ex4	Germany	3	Okotoks Oilers	7	Final - Shots: 32-29 Oilers	November 2, 2007 - 19:00 PST - Okotoks, AB
Ex5	Belarus	1	Germany	3	Final - Shots: 36 for Belarus	November 3, 2007 - 19:30 PST - Castlegar, BC
Ex6	Russia	3	Canada East	4	Final - Shots: 32-24 Can E	November 3, 2007 - 19:30 PST - Trail, BC

== 2007 Tournament ==
=== Group A ===
Pool A Standings

Pos	Team	Pld	W	L	GF	GA	GD
1	Russia	2	2	0	10	4	+6
2	Canada West	2	1	1	9	6	+3
3	Germany	2	0	2	4	13	−9

=== Group B ===
Pool B Standings

Pos	Team	Pld	W	L	GF	GA	GD
1	United States	2	2	0	10	8	+2
2	Canada East	2	1	1	6	4	+2
3	Belarus	2	0	2	7	11	−4

=== Results ===
Round-robin results
Game	Pool	Team	Score	Team	Score	Notes	Date - Time - Location
1	B	Canada East	4	Belarus	1	Final - Shots: 31-23 Can E	November 5, 2007 - 19:30 PST - Trail, BC
2	A	Russia	6	Germany	2	Final - Shots: 31-26 Russia	November 5, 2007 - 19:30 PST - Nelson, BC
3	A	Germany	2	Canada West	7	Final - Shots: 30-25 Can W	November 6, 2007 - 19:30 PST - Trail, BC
4	B	Belarus	6	United States	7	OT Final - Shots: 45-35 USA	November 6, 2007 - 19:00 PST - Nelson, BC
5	A	Canada West	2	Russia	4	Final - Shots: 37-22 Can W	November 7, 2007 - 19:30 PST - Trail, BC
6	B	United States	3	Canada East	2	OT Final - Shots: 37-23 Can E	November 7, 2007 - 19:30 PST - Nelson, BC

=== Championship Round ===
Championship Results
Game	Round	Team	Score	Team	Score	Notes	Date - Time - Location
7	Quarter	Canada West	7	Belarus	3	Final - Shots: 39-24 Can W	November 8, 2007 - 19:30 PST - Trail, BC
8	Quarter	Canada East	4	Germany	1	Final - Shots: 32-31 Can E	November 8, 2007 - 19:30 PST - Nelson, BC
9	5th Plc.	Belarus	5	Germany	3	Final - Shots: 33-31 Germany	November 10, 2007 - 14:00 PST - Trail, BC
10	Semi	United States	1	Canada West	5	Final - Shots: 34-34 Even	November 10, 2007 - 19:30 PST - Nelson, BC
11	Semi	Russia	1	Canada East	2	Final - Shots: 25-24 Russia	November 10, 2007 - 19:30 PST - Trail, BC
12	Bronze	Russia	6	United States	9	Final - Shots: 34-25 USA	November 11, 2007 - 14:00 PST - Trail, BC
13	Gold	Canada East	1	Canada West	4	Final - Shots: 26-23 Can W	November 11, 2007 - 19:30 PST - Trail, BC

=== Final standings ===
	Team
1st place, gold medalist(s)	Canada West
2nd place, silver medalist(s)	Canada East
3rd place, bronze medalist(s)	United States
4th	Russia
5th	Belarus
6th	Germany

== Statistics ==
=== Scorers ===
Scoring Leaders
Player	Team	GP	G	A	P	PIM
(Canada) Mike Connolly	Canada West	5	5	6	11	10
(United States) Barry Almeida	United States	4	3	6	9	16
(Belarus) Artem Demkov	Belarus	4	5	2	7	16
(Canada) Zac Dalpe	Canada West	5	5	2	7	2
(Canada) Casey Pierro-Zabotel	Canada West	5	3	4	7	2
(Canada) Joe Colborne	Canada West	5	3	4	7	2
(United States) Blake Kessel	United States	4	2	5	7	0
(Belarus) Yuri Eliseenko	Belarus	4	1	6	7	14
(Russia) Nikita Filatov	Russia	4	3	3	6	10
(Belarus) Pavel Razvodovski	Belarus	3	3	3	6	17

=== Goaltenders ===
Leading Goaltenders
Player	Team	GP	Mins	GA	SO	GAA	Sv%	Record
(Canada) Bradley Eidsness	Canada West	5	285	9	0	1.89	0.922	4–1
(Canada) Bryan Gillis	Canada East	5	302	10	0	1.99	0.922	3–2
(Russia) Danila Alistratov	Russia	2	91	5	0	3.30	0.914	1–0
(Germany) Andreas Tanzer	Germany	2	119	8	0	4.03	0.869	1-1
(Belarus) Vitali Trus	Belarus	2	96	7	0	4.38	0.868	1-1

== Rosters ==
=== Belarus ===
(Belarus) Players: Vitali Trus, Vitali Belinski, Valeriy Pronin, Oleg Goroshko, Aleksandr Eronov, Dmitry Shumski, Georgi Yaskevich, Sergei Kopylets, Sergei Sheleg, Aleksei Golubev, Nikolai Goncharov, Dmitry Korobov, Aleksandr Syrei, Roman Ladik, Aleksandr Korotkevich, Pavel Razvodovski, Kirill Brikun, Andrei Kolosov, Aleksandr Pavlovich, Artem Demkov, Igor Voroshilov, Nikita Komarov, Mikhail Stsefanovich, Vladimir Mikhailov, Dmitry Gorbunov, Pavel Dashkov, Andrei Stas, Yuri Eliseenko

Staff: Andrei Rasolko, Alexandre Andrievski, Dmitry Kravchenko, Sviatoslav Kiselev, Andrei Konstantinovich, Dmitry Konyakhin, Pavel Golovatski

=== Canada East ===
(Canada) Players: Bryan Gillis, Kori Coelho, Alexandre Fournier, Justin Troiani, Brendan Bureau, Brandon Burlon, Evan Zych, Chris Haltigin, Daniel Spivak, Corey Tamblyn, Ethan Werek, James McIntosh, Louke Oakley, Corey Trivino, Chris Kangas, Jeremy Franklin, Geoff Hum, Jordan Watts, Michael Budd, Mike McLaughlin, Adam Brace

Staff: Jerome Dupont, Mark Grady, Troy Ryan, Marty Abrams, Brent Ladds, Bob Baird, Darren Allan

=== Canada West ===
(Canada) Players: Bradley Eidsness, Allen York, Andrew MacWilliams, Derek Robinson, Scott Enders, Jeff Forsythe, Damon Kipped, Steven Seigo, Tommy Brown, Trevor Nill, Wes Pawluk, Ryan Magill, Andrew Cherniwchan, Joe Colborne, Derek Lee, Brooks Robinson, Casey Pierro-Zabotel, Russell Goodman, Taylor Gal, Mike Connolly, Zac Dalpe, Brett Hextall

Staff: Boris Rybalka, Al Glendinning, Dwight McMillan, Darcy Rota, Kim Davis, Wayne Hubbard, Carolyn Glover

=== Germany ===
(Germany) Players: Etienne Renkewitz, Christian Wendler, Markus Keller, Andreas Tanzer, Andre Mangold, Sinan Akdag, Sebastian Eickmann, Gregor Stein, Sören Sturm, Jens Heyer, Nicolas Ackermann, Robin Thomson, Daniel Mohle, Martin Buchwieser, Michael Christ, Patrick Geiger, Thomas Weiszdorn, Andre Huebscher, Alexander Oblinger, Dimitri Litesov, Daniel Oppolzer, Michael Rimbeck, Steven Ruppich, Robert Schopf, Marc Wittforth, David Wolf, Martin Hinterstocker

Staff: Jeffery Tomlinson, Rupert Meister, Michael Pfuhl, Michael Ulmer, Heinz Endres, Wolfgang Fischer

=== Russia ===
(Russia) Players: Danila Alistratov, Andrey Petukhov, Alexander Pechurskiy, Igor Golovkov, Andrey Grenkov, Dimitry Kostromitin, Anton Klementiev, Dmitry Kulikov, Pavel Lukin, Dmitri Kozlov, Vyacheslav Voinov, Maxim Chudinov, Eduard Orlov, Pavel Chernov, Anton Lazarev, Vyacheslav Kulemin, Andrey Kuchin, Mikhail Fisenko, Maxim Trunev, Ilya Zagretdinov, Andrei Loktionov, Dmitri Kugryshev, Evgeni Grachev, Kirill Petrov, Sergei Ostapchuk, Igor Biryukov, Magomed Gimbatov, Nikita Filatov

Staff: Alexander Biryukov, Valery Davletshin, Vladislav Kokarev, Sergey Gimaev, Maxim Elizarov, Igor Tkachenok

=== United States ===
(United States) Players: Josh Robinson, Brady Hjelle, Maxim Nicastro, Tyler Kieffer, John Lee, John Carlson, Seth Helgeson, Ben Blood, Blake Kessel, Mike Cichy, Nicolas Sacchetti, Jared Festler, Keegan Flaherty, Craig Smith, Jimmy Hayes, Nick Larson, Barry Almeida, Jack Connolly, Nick Dineen, Tim Hall, Drew LeBlanc

Staff: P. K. O'Handley, Regg Simon, Marc Boxer, Darrin Flinchem, Todd Klein, Leo Chen

== Awards ==
Most Valuable Player

Mike Connolly (Canada West)
