= Casey Pierro-Zabotel =

Canadian ice hockey player

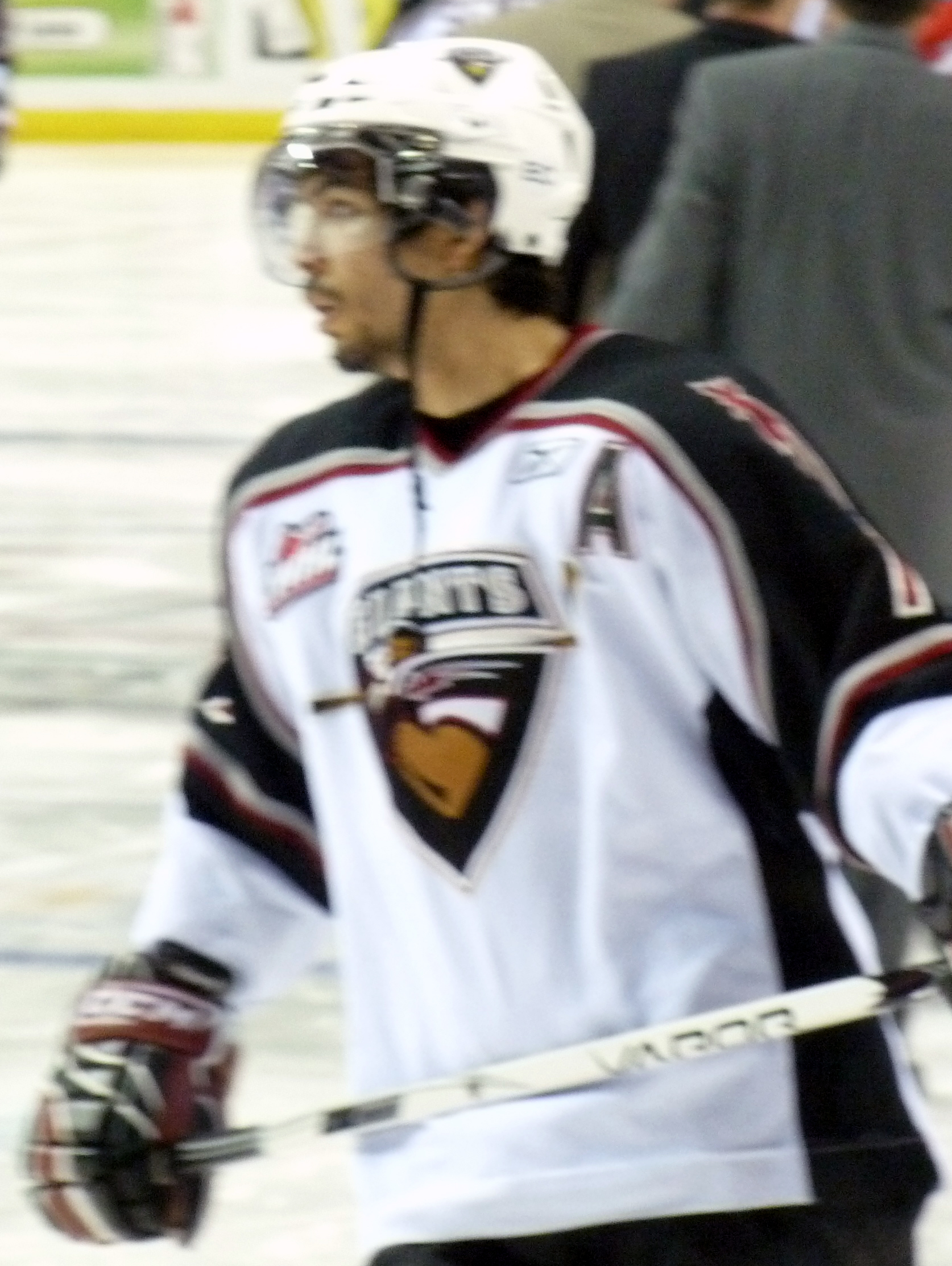
- Pierro-Zabotel with the Vancouver Giants during the 2009 WHL playoffs.
- Born: November 8, 1988 (age 37) Ashcroft, British Columbia, Canada
- Height: 6 ft 2 in (188 cm)
- Weight: 210 lb (95 kg; 15 st 0 lb)
- Position: Centre
- Shot: Left
- Played for: WBS Penguins; Charlotte Checkers; Lausitzer Füchse; Norfolk Admirals
- NHL draft: 80th overall, 2007; Pittsburgh Penguins
- Playing career: 2009–2020

Casey Pierro-Zabotel (born November 8, 1988) is a Canadian former professional ice hockey centre. He was drafted by the Pittsburgh Penguins in the 2007 NHL entry draft, 80th overall, out of the British Columbia Hockey League (BCHL). Playing major junior with the Vancouver Giants of the Western Hockey League (WHL), he set franchise single-season records in 2008–09 with 79 assists and 115 points, en route to a Bob Clarke Trophy as the league's leading scorer.

== Playing career ==
Undrafted by a Western Hockey League (WHL) team, Pierro-Zabotel began his junior hockey career with the Merritt Centennials of the Junior A British Columbia Hockey League (BCHL) in 2004–05. He produced at a near point-per-game pace in his second season with the Centennials before dominating the league in 2006–07, his draft year, with 51 goals, 65 assists and 116 points in 55 games. Going into the 2007 NHL entry draft, Pierro-Zabotel was ranked 75th among North American skaters by NHL Central Scouting, up from 87th in their mid-term rankings. He was ultimately drafted in the third round, 80th overall, by the Pittsburgh Penguins.

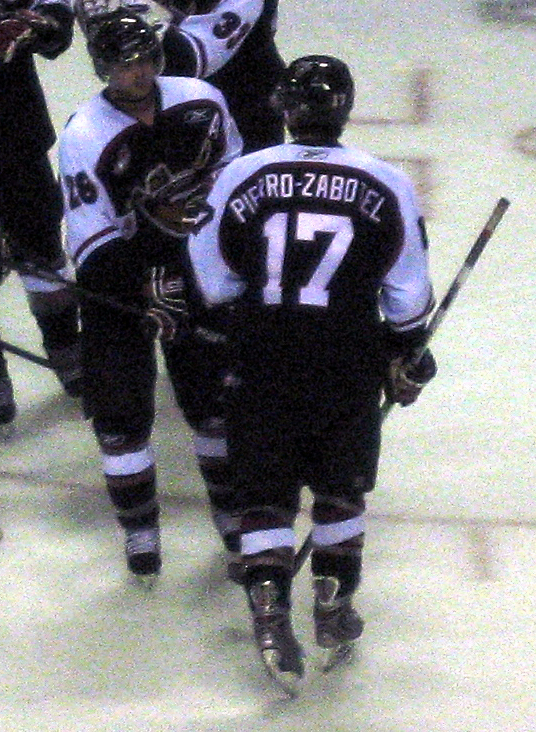
Pierro-Zabotel and Giants teammate Brent Regner in 2008.

Set to make the jump from Junior A to college hockey for Michigan Technological University in 2007–08, he was deemed ineligible to play for the first semester by the National Collegiate Athletic Association (NCAA) for academic reasons. As a result, Pierro-Zabotel instead signed with the Memorial Cup defending champions, the Vancouver Giants of the WHL, in November 2007. He scored his first WHL goal on November 24 against the Medicine Hat Tigers and tallied 48 points in 49 games for the Giants in his major junior rookie season.

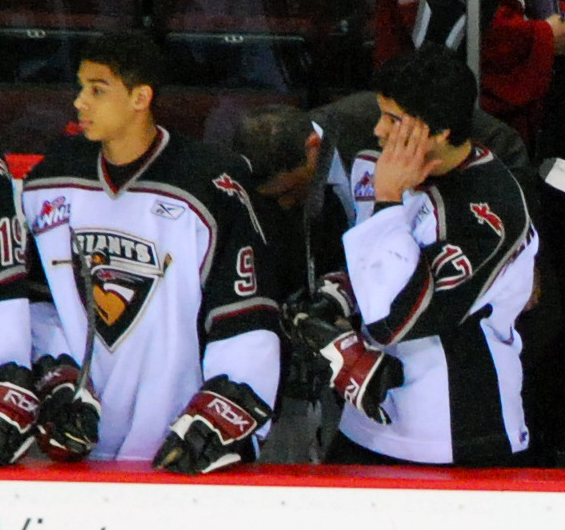
Pierro-Zabotel (right) and Giants linemate Evander Kane in 2008.

Beginning the 2008–09 season on the top line with Evander Kane, Pierro-Zabotel was named WHL Player of the Week on October 5 after recording seven points in two games. Just 44 games into the season, he set a Giants single-season record with his 54th assist as part of a five-point game on January 17, 2009, in a 9–3 win against the Red Deer Rebels. The team mark was previously set by Darren Lynch, who recorded 53 assists in 70 games in 2002–03. A little over a week later, on January 25, Pierro-Zabotel tied the Giants' franchise mark for single-season points set by Gilbert Brulé in 2004–05 with his 87th point of the season. He broke the record the next game against the Medicine Hat Tigers, on January 28, with an assist in a 4–3 win. His record-setting January was capped off with a WHL Player of the Month recognition after tallying 28 points in 15 games. Pierro-Zabotel completed his second WHL season with a league-high 115 points (36 goals and 79 assists) to become the first Giants recipient of the Bob Clarke Trophy. He was also named co-team MVP with captain Jonathon Blum and was unanimously selected to the WHL West First All-Star Team. After eliminating the Spokane Chiefs in the second round of the playoffs, Pierro-Zabotel was named the Western Conference's nominee for the Four Broncos Memorial Trophy as top WHL player. The award was given to Eastern Conference finalist Brett Sonne of the Calgary Hitmen. In game two of the semifinals, he scored the game winning overtime goal to defeat the Kelowna Rockets 4–3 and tie the series 1–1. However, the Giants were eliminated in six games. Pierro-Zabotel completed the playoffs with 17 points in 17 games.

A week after Pierro-Zabotel's final WHL season ended, the Penguins signed him to a three-year, entry-level contract on May 4, 2009. He was subsequently assigned to the American Hockey League (AHL) to join the Pittsburgh's minor league affiliate, the Wilkes-Barre/Scranton Penguins, for their 2009 playoff run. However, he did not appear in any games.

Pierro-Zabotel began the season on the Penguins' ECHL affiliate, the Wheeling Nailers, but was assigned to Wilkes-Barre/Scranton on January 21, 2010. At the time of his reassignment, he was second in team scoring with 33 points in 38 games.

In February 2011, it was announced that he was loaned to the Cincinnati Cyclones of the ECHL, who are not affiliated with the Penguins. Prior to the start of the 2011–12 season, the Wheeling Nailers traded Pierro-Zabotel to the Bakersfield Condors for future considerations.

After the 2011–12 season, his entry-level contract with the Pittsburgh Penguins organization expired. Pierro-Zabotel was not re-signed by the Condors and became a free agent on July 1, 2012. On September 27, he signed with the Gwinnett Gladiators of the ECHL.

On July 5, 2013, Pierro-Zabotel signed his first European contract, agreeing to a one-year contract with German second tier club, Lausitzer Füchse of the DEL2. He eventually returned to the Gwinnett Gladiators, where he had spent the majority of his 2012-13 season.

On July 16, 2014, Pierro-Zabotel re-signed with the Gwinnett Gladiators but was traded at the deadline to the Florida Everblades on March 12, 2015. On August 6, 2015, he continued his career in the ECHL, signing a one-year contract with reigning champions, the Allen Americans. In the 2015–16 season, Pierro-Zabotel quickly transitioned to become an integral contributor to the Americans offence, posting 15 goals and 47 points in 58 regular season games. With 16 playoff points, Pierro-Zabotel helped Allen retain the ECHL championship.

As a free agent in the off-season, Pierro-Zabotel opted to join his seventh ECHL club in agreeing to a one-year deal with the Colorado Eagles on August 11, 2016. In his lone season with the Eagles, Pierro-Zabotel claimed his second consecutive Kelly Cup, posting 15 points in 24 playoff appearances.

After a second stint with the Allen Americans, Pierro-Zabotel continued his tenure in the ECHL, agreeing to terms with the Adirondack Thunder on September 3, 2019.

== International play ==
Medal record

Representing Canada West

Ice hockey

World Junior A Challenge
Gold medal – first place	2007 Trail	
Gold medal – first place	2006 Yorkton	

Following his second season in the BCHL, Pierro-Zabotel competed for Canada West at the inaugural 2006 World Junior A Challenge in Yorkton, Saskatchewan. Playing Canada East in the final, Pierro-Zabotel scored the game-winning goal on the powerplay to win the gold medal by a 4–3 score. He finished with nine points in four games, second in tournament scoring behind teammate and tournament MVP Kyle Turris.

The next year, Pierro-Zabotel was named team captain for Canada West for the 2007 World Junior A Challenge in Trail, British Columbia. He led his team past Belarus in a 7–4 quarter-final win with a natural hat trick in the third period, scored in just 4 minutes, en route to a second straight gold medal win against Canada East in the final. He finished with seven points in five games, tied for second in team scoring behind tournament MVP Mike Connolly.

== Records ==
- Vancouver Giants franchise record; most assists, single-season – 79 in 2008–09 (surpassed Darren Lynch – 53 in 2002–03)
- Vancouver Giants franchise record; most points, single-season – 115 in 2008–09 (surpassed Gilbert Brulé – 87 in 2004–05)

== Personal life ==
Pierro-Zabotel married his long-time girlfriend, Levi Gottfriedson, in December 2008, and they have two children together.

== Career statistics ==
=== Regular season and playoffs ===
			Regular season					Playoffs
Season	Team	League	GP	G	A	Pts	PIM	GP	G	A	Pts	PIM
2004–05	Merritt Centennials	BCHL	58	6	6	12	19	—	—	—	—	—
2005–06	Merritt Centennials	BCHL	60	25	30	55	29	—	—	—	—	—
2006–07	Merritt Centennials	BCHL	55	51	65	116	42	—	—	—	—	—
2007–08	Vancouver Giants	WHL	49	19	29	48	8	10	2	4	6	4
2008–09	Vancouver Giants	WHL	72	36	79	115	52	17	4	13	17	16
2009–10	Wheeling Nailers	ECHL	49	12	29	41	26	—	—	—	—	—
2009–10	Wilkes-Barre/Scranton Penguins	AHL	9	0	1	1	0	—	—	—	—	—
2010–11	Wheeling Nailers	ECHL	42	14	20	34	42	—	—	—	—	—
2010–11	Cincinnati Cyclones	ECHL	25	4	16	20	8	4	0	0	0	0
2011–12	Bakersfield Condors	ECHL	71	8	27	35	50	—	—	—	—	—
2012–13	Gwinnett Gladiators	ECHL	66	22	53	75	30	10	1	8	9	2
2012–13	Charlotte Checkers	AHL	5	1	1	2	0	—	—	—	—	—
2013–14	Lausitzer Füchse	DEL2	33	5	17	22	20	—	—	—	—	—
2013–14	Gwinnett Gladiators	ECHL	36	7	21	28	17	—	—	—	—	—
2014–15	Gwinnett Gladiators	ECHL	54	23	37	60	32	—	—	—	—	—
2014–15	Norfolk Admirals	AHL	3	0	0	0	0	—	—	—	—	—
2014–15	Florida Everblades	ECHL	5	0	4	4	2	12	4	2	6	0
2015–16	Allen Americans	ECHL	58	15	32	47	12	24	7	9	16	16
2016–17	Colorado Eagles	ECHL	72	24	64	88	47	20	4	11	15	6
2017–18	Allen Americans	ECHL	72	19	50	69	26	7	2	0	2	2
2018–19	Allen Americans	ECHL	8	1	2	3	2	—	—	—	—	—
2019–20	Adirondack Thunder	ECHL	63	24	15	39	28	—	—	—	—	—
ECHL totals			621	173	370	543	322	77	18	30	48	26

=== International ===
Year	Team	Event	Result	GP	G	A	Pts	PIM
2006	Canada West	WJAC	1st place, gold medalist(s)	4	3	6	9	4
2007	Canada West	WJAC	1st place, gold medalist(s)	5	3	4	7	2
Junior totals				9	6	10	16	6

== Awards and honours ==
Award	Year
BCHL
MVP	2007
WHL
West First All-Star Team	2009
Bob Clarke Trophy	2009
CHL Second All-Star Team	2009
Player of the Week (October 5)	2008–09
Player of the Month (January)	2008–09
ECHL
First All-Star Team	2013, 2017
All-Star Game	2013
Kelly Cup (Allen Americans)	2016
Kelly Cup (Colorado Eagles)	2017

Awards and achievements
Preceded by Mark Santorelli	Bob Clarke Trophy; 2008–09	Succeeded by Brandon Kozun
