= Steven Seigo =

Canadian ice hockey player (born 1990)

- Born: August 1, 1990 (age 36) Edenwold, Saskatchewan, Canada
- Height: 6 ft 0 in (183 cm)
- Weight: 187 lb (85 kg; 13 st 5 lb)
- Position: Defence
- Shoots: Right
- EIHL team Former teams: Glasgow Clan; Abbotsford Heat; TPS; Dinamo Riga; Lukko; Mora IK; Straubing Tigers; Vaasan Sport; ERC Ingolstadt; HK Poprad; Mora IK; EC Kassel Huskies
- NHL draft: Undrafted
- Playing career: 2013–present

Steven Seigo (born August 1, 1990) is a Canadian professional ice hockey defenceman. He is currently signed to UK Elite Ice Hockey League (EIHL) side Glasgow Clan.

== Playing career ==
Seigo attended the Michigan Technological University where he played four seasons (2009 – 2013) of NCAA Division I hockey with the Michigan Tech Huskies, scoring 19 goals and 56 assists for 75 points, and earning 85 penalty minutes in 150 games played.

On March 22, 2013, the Abbotsford Heat of the American Hockey League (AHL) signed Seigo to an amateur try-out agreement, allowing Seigo to skate in nine games with the Heat towards the end of the 2012–13 AHL season.

On July 8, 2013, HC TPS of the SM-liiga signed Seigo for the 2013–14 season. He then had his contract renewed for the 2014-15 campaign. Following his two-year stint in Finland, he joined Dinamo Riga of the Kontinental Hockey League (KHL) for the 2015–16 season.

In May 2016, he penned a deal with Lukko of the Finnish SM-liiga. Seigo added to his journeyman status playing the following 2017–18 season with Swedish club, Mora IK, of the Swedish Hockey League.

As a free agent, Seigo belatedly signed a one-year agreement with German club, the Straubing Tigers of the Deutsche Eishockey Liga, leading into the 2018–19 season, on September 4, 2018. As a staple on the blueline, Seigo added 5 goals and 18 points in 51 games before being unable to help the Tigers progress pass the Wild Card round to the playoffs. He left the Tigers as a free agent at the conclusion of his contract.

On March 28, 2019, Seigo opted return to Finland and continue his career in the Liiga, signing a one-year deal with Vaasan Sport.

After spells in Germany with ERC Ingolstadt and EC Kassel Huskies, with Slovakian side HK Poprad and Swedish team Mora IK, Seigo signed terms with UK EIHL side Glasgow Clan in July 2024.

== Career statistics ==
			Regular season					Playoffs
Season	Team	League	GP	G	A	Pts	PIM	GP	G	A	Pts	PIM
2004–05	Notre Dame Argos	SMHL	6	0	0	0	4	—	—	—	—	—
2005–06	Notre Dame Hounds	SMHL	42	6	18	24	26	—	—	—	—	—
2006–07	Bonnyville Pontiacs	AJHL	56	6	10	16	16	5	0	0	0	2
2007–08	Bonnyville Pontiacs	AJHL	58	8	20	28	36	7	1	1	2	14
2008–09	Bonnyville Pontiacs	AJHL	47	14	25	39	19	4	0	2	2	2
2009–10	Michigan Tech	WCHA	36	4	15	19	31	—	—	—	—	—
2010–11	Michigan Tech	WCHA	38	4	13	17	24	—	—	—	—	—
2011–12	Michigan Tech	WCHA	39	5	17	22	22	—	—	—	—	—
2012–13	Michigan Tech	WCHA	37	6	11	17	8	—	—	—	—	—
2012–13	Abbotsford Heat	AHL	9	0	2	2	4	—	—	—	—	—
2013–14	TPS	Liiga	60	6	17	23	28	—	—	—	—	—
2014–15	TPS	Liiga	53	5	9	14	39	—	—	—	—	—
2015–16	Dinamo Riga	KHL	53	4	15	19	55	—	—	—	—	—
2016–17	Lukko	Liiga	58	5	9	14	43	—	—	—	—	—
2017–18	Mora IK	SHL	51	5	12	17	16	—	—	—	—	—
2018–19	Straubing Tigers	DEL	51	5	13	18	32	2	0	2	2	0
2019–20	Vaasan Sport	Liiga	20	3	7	10	31	—	—	—	—	—
2019–20	ERC Ingolstadt	DEL	13	2	1	3	8	—	—	—	—	—
2020–21	HK Poprad	Slovak	24	1	7	8	12	8	0	0	0	2
Liiga totals			191	19	42	61	141	—	—	—	—	—
KHL totals			53	4	15	19	55	—	—	—	—	—

Medal record

Ice hockey

Representing Canada West

World Junior A Challenge
Gold medal – first place	2007 Trail	
Silver medal – second place	2008 Camrose	

== Awards and honours ==
Award	Year
AJHL
North All-Star Team	2008, 2009
All League All-Star	2008, 2009
