= Zac Dalpe =

Canadian ice hockey player (born 1989)

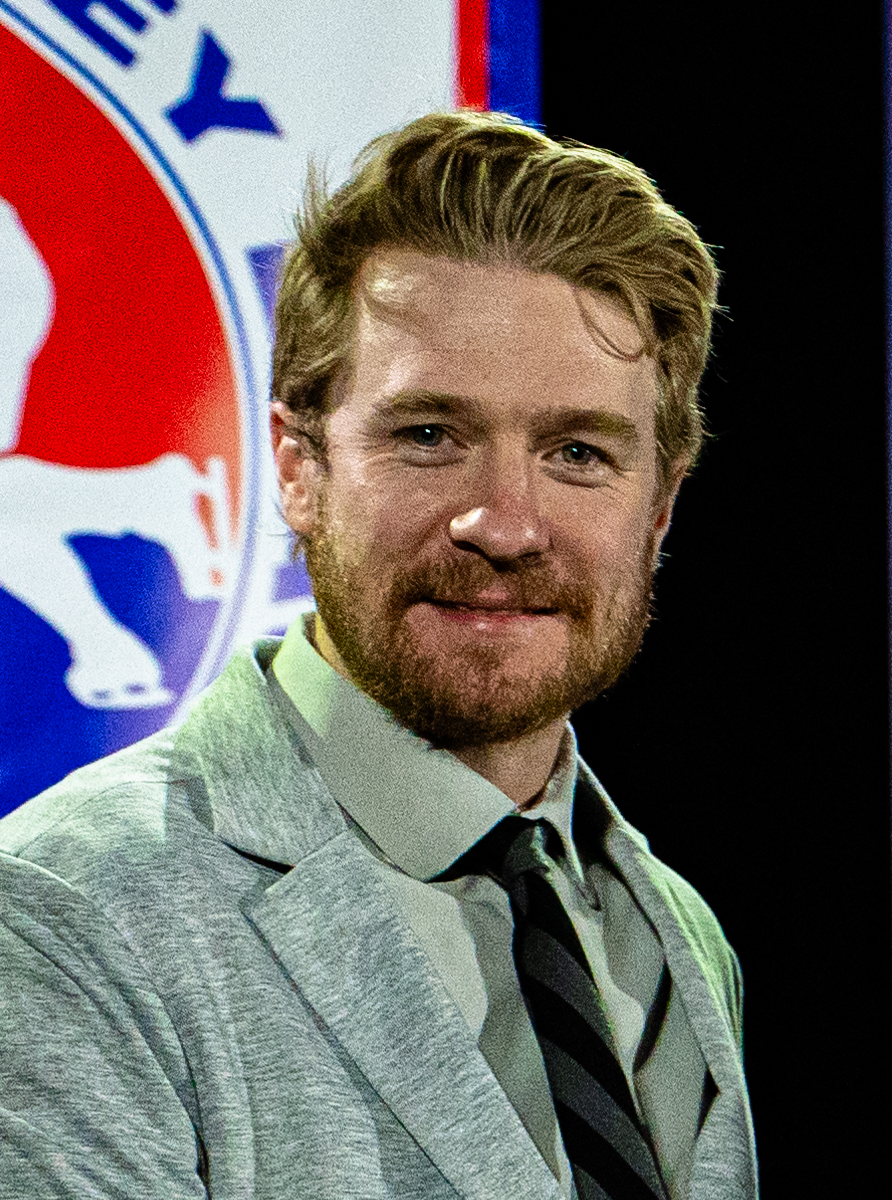
- Dalpe in 2025
- Born: November 1, 1989 (age 37) Paris, Ontario, Canada
- Height: 6 ft 2 in (188 cm)
- Weight: 193 lb (88 kg; 13 st 11 lb)
- Position: Centre
- Shot: Right
- Played for: Carolina Hurricanes; Vancouver Canucks; Buffalo Sabres; Minnesota Wild; Columbus Blue Jackets; Florida Panthers
- NHL draft: 45th overall, 2008; Carolina Hurricanes
- Playing career: 2010–2025

Medal record

Ice hockey

Representing Canada West

World Junior A Challenge
Gold medal – first place	2007 Trail	

Zac Dalpe (born November 1, 1989) is a Canadian former professional ice hockey centre. Drafted 45th overall by the Carolina Hurricanes in 2008, Dalpe played in the British Columbia Hockey League and Central Collegiate Hockey Association before turning professional.

== Playing career ==
=== Minor Hockey ===
Dalpe grew up playing minor hockey in his hometown of Paris, Ontario for the Paris Wolfpack of the Ontario Minor Hockey Association (OMHA)'s Southern Counties League. He later played for the Brantford 99'ers AAA club in Western Ontario's Pavilion League. In 2004-05, Dalpe advanced to the AAA Minor Midget level for the 99'ers.

Listed in his Ontario Hockey League (OHL) draft year at just 5'5" and 115 lbs., Dalpe went unselected in the 2005 OHL Priority Selection and returned to play AAA Major Midget in 2005-06.

=== Junior and College ===
After playing Major Midget, Dalpe signed with the Stratford Cullitons Junior B club of the Midwestern Ontario Hockey League for 2006-07. The following year, Dalpe headed to Western Canada and signed with the British Columbia Hockey League's Penticton Vees Junior A club in 2007-08.

After that season, Dalpe was drafted in the 2nd round (26th overall) of the 2008 OHL Priority Draft by the Plymouth Whalers. That same year, he was selected by the Carolina Hurricanes (2nd round, 45th overall) in the 2008 NHL entry draft.

Dalpe did not play for Plymouth or Carolina (Hurricanes/River Rats/Checkers) that year. Instead, he chose to accept an NCAA scholarship at Ohio State University for the 2008-09 campaign. He played for the Buckeyes for two seasons before making the jump to professional hockey.

=== Professional ===
Dalpe played in his first NHL game on October 7, 2010, after impressing the Hurricanes during training camp and surviving several rounds of cuts. Dalpe recorded an assist in the game for his first NHL point. He scored his first NHL goal on January 1, 2011 against Johan Hedberg of the New Jersey Devils. Prior to the start of the 2013–14 season Dalpe, along with Jeremy Welsh, was traded to the Vancouver Canucks in exchange for Kellan Tochkin and a fourth round selection in the 2014 NHL Draft.

On July 13, 2014, Dalpe signed a one-year free agent contract with the Buffalo Sabres.

Dalpe was not tendered a qualifying offer by the Sabres, and on the first day of free agency signed a one-year, two way contract with the Minnesota Wild on July 1, 2015. He scored his first goal for the Wild as their only goal on April 9, 2016 against Niklas Backstrom of the Calgary Flames.

Dalpe made the Wild's opening night roster for the 2016–17 season, appearing in 9 games for 3 points before suffering a knee injury, requiring surgery, against the Dallas Stars on October 30, 2016. Upon his return to health, Dalpe was reassigned to AHL affiliate, the Iowa Wild, before suffering a second knee injury. On February 27, 2017, Dalpe was placed on waivers; he was claimed by the Columbus Blue Jackets. He was immediately reassigned to the AHL to play with the Jackets' affiliate, the Cleveland Monsters.

On June 9, 2017, the Blue Jackets re-signed Dalpe to a two-year, two-way contract extension. Dalpe started the 2017–18 season on the Blue Jackets' NHL roster before he was later returned to the Monsters after 12 games.

During the 2018–19 season, while leading the Cleveland Monsters in goals and points, Dalpe was signed to a two-year, two-way extension to remain with the Blue Jackets on February 27, 2019.

After five seasons within the Blue Jackets organization, on July 30, 2021, Dalpe left the club as a free agent and signed a two-year, two-way contract with the Florida Panthers, marking a return to play with affiliate and former AHL club, the Charlotte Checkers.

Dalpe was named as the Checkers team captain for the 2021-2022 season.

On April 28, 2023, Dalpe scored his first Stanley Cup playoff goal in game 6 of the first-round series between the Florida Panthers and Boston Bruins, tying the game at 4–4 for the Panthers. The Panthers would go on to win the game 7–5, tying the series at 3 and eventually defeated the Bruins in game 7 to pull off one of the greatest upsets in NHL history.

On July 7, 2025, Dalpe announced his retirement from hockey.

== Career statistics ==
			Regular season					Playoffs
Season	Team	League	GP	G	A	Pts	PIM	GP	G	A	Pts	PIM
2004–05	Brantford '99ers	MHAO	67	24	18	42	12	—	—	—	—	—
2005–06	Brantford '99ers	MHAO	39	33	40	73	36	—	—	—	—	—
2006–07	Stratford Cullitons	GOJHL	48	26	40	66	62	—	—	—	—	—
2007–08	Penticton Vees	BCHL	46	27	36	63	114	—	—	—	—	—
2008–09	Ohio State Buckeyes	CCHA	37	13	12	25	25	—	—	—	—	—
2009–10	Ohio State Buckeyes	CCHA	39	21	24	45	19	—	—	—	—	—
2009–10	Albany River Rats	AHL	9	6	1	7	0	8	3	3	6	0
2010–11	Carolina Hurricanes	NHL	15	3	1	4	0	—	—	—	—	—
2010–11	Charlotte Checkers	AHL	61	23	34	57	21	16	6	7	13	6
2011–12	Carolina Hurricanes	NHL	16	1	2	3	4	—	—	—	—	—
2011–12	Charlotte Checkers	AHL	56	18	13	31	17	—	—	—	—	—
2012–13	Charlotte Checkers	AHL	54	21	21	42	12	5	0	0	0	4
2012–13	Carolina Hurricanes	NHL	10	1	2	3	0	—	—	—	—	—
2013–14	Vancouver Canucks	NHL	55	4	3	7	6	—	—	—	—	—
2013–14	Utica Comets	AHL	6	0	3	3	2	—	—	—	—	—
2014–15	Rochester Americans	AHL	44	16	12	28	0	—	—	—	—	—
2014–15	Buffalo Sabres	NHL	21	1	2	3	4	—	—	—	—	—
2015–16	Iowa Wild	AHL	8	3	1	4	24	—	—	—	—	—
2015–16	Minnesota Wild	NHL	2	1	0	1	0	3	0	0	0	0
2016–17	Minnesota Wild	NHL	9	1	2	3	9	—	—	—	—	—
2016–17	Iowa Wild	AHL	12	2	0	2	0	—	—	—	—	—
2016–17	Cleveland Monsters	AHL	20	8	7	15	22	—	—	—	—	—
2017–18	Columbus Blue Jackets	NHL	12	0	0	0	13	—	—	—	—	—
2017–18	Cleveland Monsters	AHL	35	11	15	26	35	—	—	—	—	—
2018–19	Cleveland Monsters	AHL	55	33	22	55	43	8	2	1	3	16
2018–19	Columbus Blue Jackets	NHL	1	0	1	1	0	—	—	—	—	—
2019–20	Cleveland Monsters	AHL	18	7	4	11	4	—	—	—	—	—
2020–21	Cleveland Monsters	AHL	5	3	1	4	5	—	—	—	—	—
2020–21	Columbus Blue Jackets	NHL	12	2	1	3	0	—	—	—	—	—
2021–22	Charlotte Checkers	AHL	68	30	9	39	43	7	7	1	8	2
2021–22	Florida Panthers	NHL	1	0	0	0	0	—	—	—	—	—
2022–23	Charlotte Checkers	AHL	47	21	14	35	19	—	—	—	—	—
2022–23	Florida Panthers	NHL	14	2	2	4	2	13	1	0	1	2
2023–24	Charlotte Checkers	AHL	67	17	13	30	50	3	1	0	1	2
2024–25	Charlotte Checkers	AHL	9	1	2	3	2	—	—	—	—	—
NHL totals			168	16	16	32	38	16	1	0	1	2

== Awards and honours ==
Award	Year
College
All-CCHA Rookie Team	2009
All-CCHA First Team	2010
AHCA West Second-Team All-American	2010
