= Ethan Werek =

Canadian ice hockey player (born 1991)

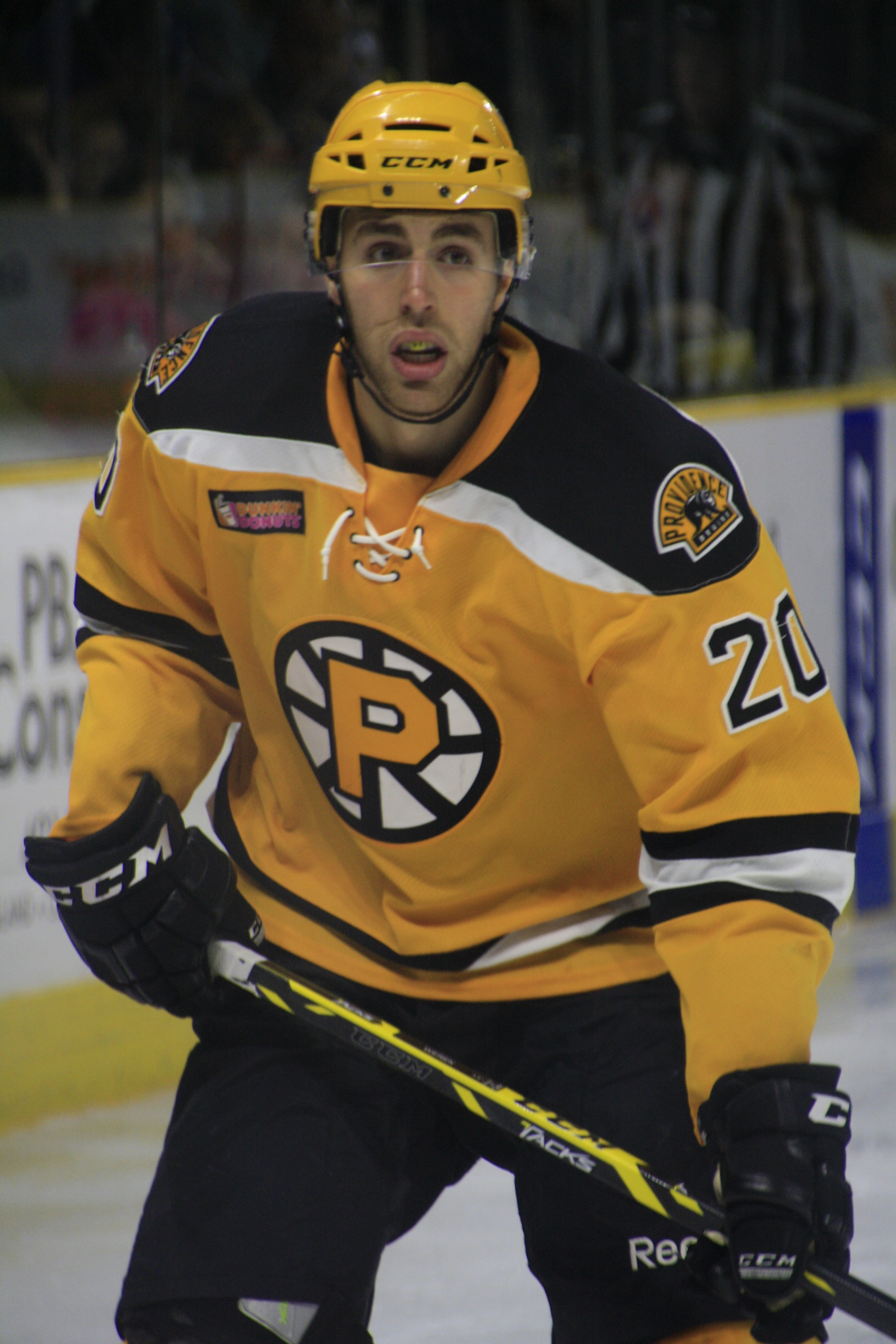
- Werek with the Providence Bruins in 2014
- Born: June 7, 1991 (age 35) Markham, Ontario, Canada
- Height: 6 ft 2 in (188 cm)
- Weight: 200 lb (91 kg; 14 st 4 lb)
- Position: Centre
- Shoots: Left
- team Former teams: Free agent Portland Pirates; Providence Bruins; Charlotte Checkers; Texas Stars; Belleville Senators; HC Ocelari Trinec; Kunlun Red Star; Mountfield HK; HC Slovan Bratislava
- National team: China
- NHL draft: 47th overall, 2009; New York Rangers
- Playing career: 2011–present

Ethan Werek (born June 7, 1991), also known as Wei Ruike (Chinese: 韦瑞克), is a Chinese-Canadian professional ice hockey forward. Born in Canada. He is currently a free agent. He represented China at the 2022 Winter Olympics. He was selected by the New York Rangers in the 2nd round (47th overall) of the 2009 NHL entry draft.

== Playing career ==
=== Junior ===
Werek was the first-round pick of the Kingston Frontenacs of the OHL in the 2007 OHL Priority Selection. Initially, Werek told the team that he would not report, opting instead to keep his NCAA eligibility as he had verbally committed to playing for Boston University. After a successful season of tier II hockey with the Stouffville Spirit of the OPJHL during the 2007–08 season, in which he was the league rookie of the year after scoring 29 goals and 70 points in 37 games with the Spirit, Werek finally decided to sign with Kingston in September 2008.

Werek played his first OHL game on September 18, 2008, as he was held pointless in a 4–1 loss to the Peterborough Petes. In his next game, on September 26, 2008, Werek scored his first career OHL goal against J.P. Anderson of the Mississauga St. Michael's Majors in a 6–4 loss. Overall, Werek tied for first on the club with 32 goals and finished second with 64 points while appearing in 66 games for Kingston.

Werek returned to the Frontenacs for the 2009–10 OHL season, scoring 30 goals and 64 points in 57 games, helping the club reach the playoffs. In six playoff games, Werek scored three goals and five points as the Frontenacs lost to the Brampton Battalion in the Eastern Conference quarter-finals.

Werek played a third season in Kingston during the 2010–11 season, playing in 47 games, scoring 24 goals and 52 points for the Frontenacs. In the playoffs, Werek appeared in three games, earning three assists, as the club lost to the Oshawa Generals in the Eastern Conference quarter-finals.

=== Professional ===
Werek was drafted by the New York Rangers in the second round, 47th overall pick, of the 2009 NHL entry draft. On May 8, 2011, the Rangers traded Werek to the Phoenix Coyotes for Oscar Lindberg.

Werek joined the Phoenix Coyotes AHL affiliate, the Portland Pirates, for the 2011–12 season. Werek played his first professional game on October 8, 2011, earning an assist in a 4–2 victory over the Bridgeport Sound Tigers. Werek scored his first AHL goal on December 9, 2011, a short-handed game-winning goal with twenty seconds left in the third period against Michael Leighton of the Adirondack Phantoms in a 2–1 win. Werek finished the season with 10 goals and 19 points in 67 games with Portland.

Werek once again played with the Pirates for the 2012–13 season, appearing in 67 games for the team, and improved his offensive numbers to 11 goals and 25 points, helping Portland reach the playoffs. Werek played in only one playoff game, earning an assist in a 4–3 overtime loss to the Syracuse Crunch.

Werek's entry-level contract ended at the conclusion of the 2013–14 season. The Coyotes elected not to make a qualifying offer to him, and as a result, he became an unrestricted free agent on August 29, 2014.

Before the 2014–15 season, Werek signed a one-year AHL contract with the Providence Bruins on September 17, 2014, and was also invited to attend the Boston Bruins training camp. Werek solidified his position within the Bruins, and accumulated 20 points in 53 games.

Unable to earn another contract with Providence, Werek was unsigned throughout the off-season until accepting a one-year ECHL contract with the Florida Everblades on October 3, 2015. He was later called up to the Charlotte Checkers of the AHL affiliate of the Carolina Hurricanes in December 2015 and later signed a contract with the Checkers for the remainder of the season.

After spending the duration of the 2016–17 season with the Texas Stars of the AHL, Werek left North America as a free agent in agreeing to a one-year deal with Chinese club, HC Kunlun Red Star of the Kontinental Hockey League on June 27, 2017. After participating in the pre-season, Werek was released from his contract with Kunlun. He returned to North America and initially attended training camp with the Brampton Beast of the ECHL to begin the 2017–18 season. On October 13, 2017, he was signed to a professional try-out deal with the Belleville Senators.

== International play ==
Medal record

Ice hockey

Representing Canada

World Junior A Challenge
Silver medal – second place	2007 Trail	

Representing Canada Ontario

World U-17 Hockey Challenge
Gold medal – first place	2008 London	

Werek played for Canada East at the 2007 World Junior A Challenge, as he was held pointless in five games, as the club won the silver medal. He played with Team Ontario at the 2008 World U-17 Hockey Challenge, where in six games, he had two assists and earned a gold medal after Ontario defeated the United States 3–0 in the final game.

Werek appeared for Team Canada at the 2009 IIHF World U18 Championships, as he scored four goals and six points in six games, as Canada finished in fourth place at the tournament.

Werek was named to the Chinese national team for the 2022 Winter Olympics on January 28, 2022.

== Personal life ==
Werek, who is Jewish, attended Pickering College in Newmarket while living in the Stouffville area.

Werek's great-grandparents were Russian Jews who fled to Harbin during World War I, where his grandparents grew up before emigrating to Israel, where Werek's father was born. Werek holds Israeli citizenship through his father.

== Career statistics ==
=== Regular season and playoffs ===
			Regular season					Playoffs
Season	Team	League	GP	G	A	Pts	PIM	GP	G	A	Pts	PIM
2007–08	Stouffville Spirit	OPJHL	37	29	41	70	76	—	—	—	—	—
2008–09	Kingston Frontenacs	OHL	66	32	32	64	83	—	—	—	—	—
2009–10	Kingston Frontenacs	OHL	52	30	34	64	68	6	3	2	5	9
2010–11	Kingston Frontenacs	OHL	47	24	28	52	51	3	0	3	3	12
2011–12	Portland Pirates	AHL	67	10	9	19	53	—	—	—	—	—
2012–13	Portland Pirates	AHL	67	11	14	25	43	1	0	1	1	0
2013–14	Portland Pirates	AHL	48	4	8	12	32	—	—	—	—	—
2014–15	Providence Bruins	AHL	53	8	12	20	30	—	—	—	—	—
2015–16	Florida Everblades	ECHL	25	12	14	26	16	5	1	3	4	4
2015–16	Charlotte Checkers	AHL	40	9	7	16	24	—	—	—	—	—
2016–17	Orlando Solar Bears	ECHL	2	1	2	3	2	—	—	—	—	—
2016–17	Texas Stars	AHL	55	13	14	27	53	—	—	—	—	—
2017–18	Belleville Senators	AHL	57	10	15	25	38	—	—	—	—	—
2018–19	HC Oceláři Třinec	ELH	34	13	11	24	42	17	6	2	8	10
2019–20	Kunlun Red Star	KHL	61	9	13	22	28	—	—	—	—	—
2020–21	Kunlun Red Star	KHL	53	15	17	32	42	—	—	—	—	—
2021–22	Kunlun Red Star	KHL	45	7	8	15	38	—	—	—	—	—
2022–23	Kunlun Red Star	KHL	28	3	4	7	22	—	—	—	—	—
AHL totals			387	65	79	144	273	1	0	1	1	0
KHL totals			187	34	42	76	130	—	—	—	—	—

=== International ===
Year	Team	Event	Result	GP	G	A	Pts	PIM
2007	Canada East	WJAC19	2nd place, silver medalist(s)	5	0	0	0	2
2008	Canada Ontario	U17	1st place, gold medalist(s)	6	0	2	2	4
2009	Canada	WJC18	4th	6	4	2	6	6
2022	China	OG	12th	4	0	1	1	4
Junior totals				17	4	4	8	12
Senior totals				4	0	1	1	4

== Awards and honours ==
Award	Year
OHL
CHL Top Prospects Game	2009
All-Star Game	2010

== See also ==
- List of select Jewish ice hockey players
