= Barry Almeida =

American ice hockey player

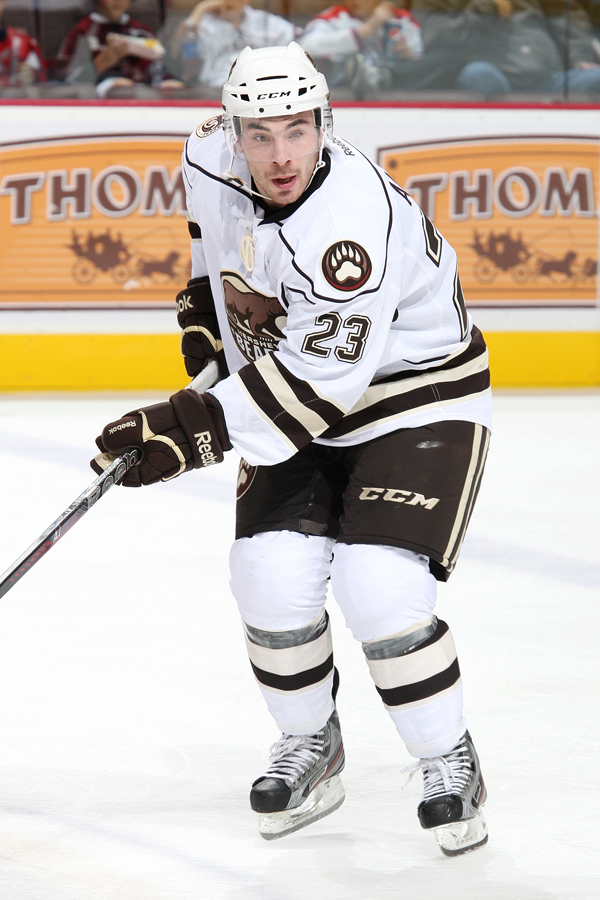
- Almeida with the Hershey Bears in 2012
- Born: November 20, 1988 (age 36) Longmeadow, Massachusetts, U.S.
- Height: 5 ft 8 in (173 cm)
- Weight: 185 lb (84 kg; 13 st 3 lb)
- Position: Center
- Shot: Left
- Played for: Hershey Bears; HC Gherdëina; Coventry Blaze; Worcester Railers
- NHL draft: Undrafted
- Playing career: 2012–2020

Barry Almeida (born November 20, 1988) is a retired American professional ice hockey center who last played for the Worcester Railers of the ECHL.

== Playing career ==
Almeida played in the United States Hockey League with the Omaha Lancers in the 2007–08 season, scoring the goal in overtime of the final's to win the playoff championship. He started to play for the Boston College Eagles in Hockey East in the 2008–09 season. Almeida played on two NCAA national championships teams in 2010, and 2012.

Almeida signed an amateur try-out contract upon the completion of his collegiate career with affiliate of the Washington Capitals, the Hershey Bears on April 9, 2012. He scored his first professional goal in his professional debut against the Worcester Sharks.

On April 30, 2012 he was extended by Hershey to a one-year, two way AHL contract.

In the 2013–14 season, Almeida signed an AHL contract with the Milwaukee Admirals. He failed to make the team out of training camp and was assigned to ECHL club, the Cincinnati Cyclones for the duration of the year.

After helping the Cyclone reach the Kelly Cup finals, Almeida signed his first European contract, agreeing to a one-year deal with Kallinge-Ronneby IF in the Swedish Division 1 on June 11, 2014. Failing to adapt to the Hockeyettan, Almeida opted to return to North America and signed a one-year ECHL contract with the Utah Grizzlies on September 30, 2014.

After two seasons with the Grizzlies, Almeida left the club alongside cousin and teammate T.J. Syner, to sign abroad for Italian club, HC Gherdëina of the Alps Hockey League on June 2, 2016. In November 2016, Almeida along with Syner moved to the UK to sign for the Coventry Blaze of the Elite Ice Hockey League. In scoring 40 points in 39 games, Almeida later departed Coventry, with Syner, in May 2017.

On June 26, 2017, Almeida continued his playing partnership with Syner by signing a one-year contract in a return to the ECHL with inaugural club, Worcester Railers.

== Career statistics ==
Medal record

Ice hockey

Representing United States

World Junior A Challenge
Bronze medal – third place	2007 Trail	

			Regular season					Playoffs
Season	Team	League	GP	G	A	Pts	PIM	GP	G	A	Pts	PIM
2004–05	New England Jr. Falcons	EJHL	47	21	18	39	44	—	—	—	—	—
2005–06	New England Jr. Falcons	EJHL	42	37	28	65	69	—	—	—	—	—
2005–06	USNTDP	USDP	4	2	5	7	4	—	—	—	—	—
2006–07	Omaha Lancers	USHL	31	10	17	27	20	5	2	3	5	8
2007–08	Omaha Lancers	USHL	56	22	38	60	22	14	4	4	8	8
2008–09	Boston College	HE	35	7	11	18	8	—	—	—	—	—
2009–10	Boston College	HE	42	8	5	13	24	—	—	—	—	—
2010–11	Boston College	HE	38	8	13	21	22	—	—	—	—	—
2011–12	Boston College	HE	44	22	18	40	22	—	—	—	—	—
2011–12	Hershey Bears	AHL	1	1	0	1	0	1	0	0	0	0
2012–13	Hershey Bears	AHL	35	6	8	14	10	—	—	—	—	—
2012–13	Reading Royals	ECHL	27	10	14	24	10	15	4	2	6	0
2013–14	Cincinnati Cyclones	ECHL	47	15	11	26	23	22	2	6	8	10
2014–15	Utah Grizzlies	ECHL	55	13	27	40	34	—	—	—	—	—
2015–16	Utah Grizzlies	ECHL	57	29	19	48	56	10	5	8	13	20
2016–17	HC Gherdëina	AlpsHL	3	1	4	5	8	—	—	—	—	—
2016–17	Coventry Blaze	EIHL	39	15	25	40	32	—	—	—	—	—
2017–18	Worcester Railers	ECHL	68	22	39	61	36	6	3	1	4	4
2018–19	Worcester Railers	ECHL	72	22	30	52	70	—	—	—	—	—
2019–20	Worcester Railers	ECHL	52	16	21	37	22	—	—	—	—	—
AHL totals			36	7	8	15	10	1	0	0	0	0

== Awards and honors ==
Award	Year
USHL
First All-Star Team	2008
Player of the Year Award (finalist)	2008
College
All-Hockey East First Team	2011–12
AHCA East Second-Team All-American	2011–12
