= Klementyev =

Klementyev, Klementʹev (Russian: Клементьев), female Klementyeva, is a Russian surname, derived from the given name Klementy and meaning literally Klementy's. Its Latvian form is Klementjevs.

- Andrey Valerevich Klementyev (born 1974)
- Anton Klementyev (born 1990)
- Vladimir Klementyev (born 1956)
