= Blake Kessel =

American ice hockey player

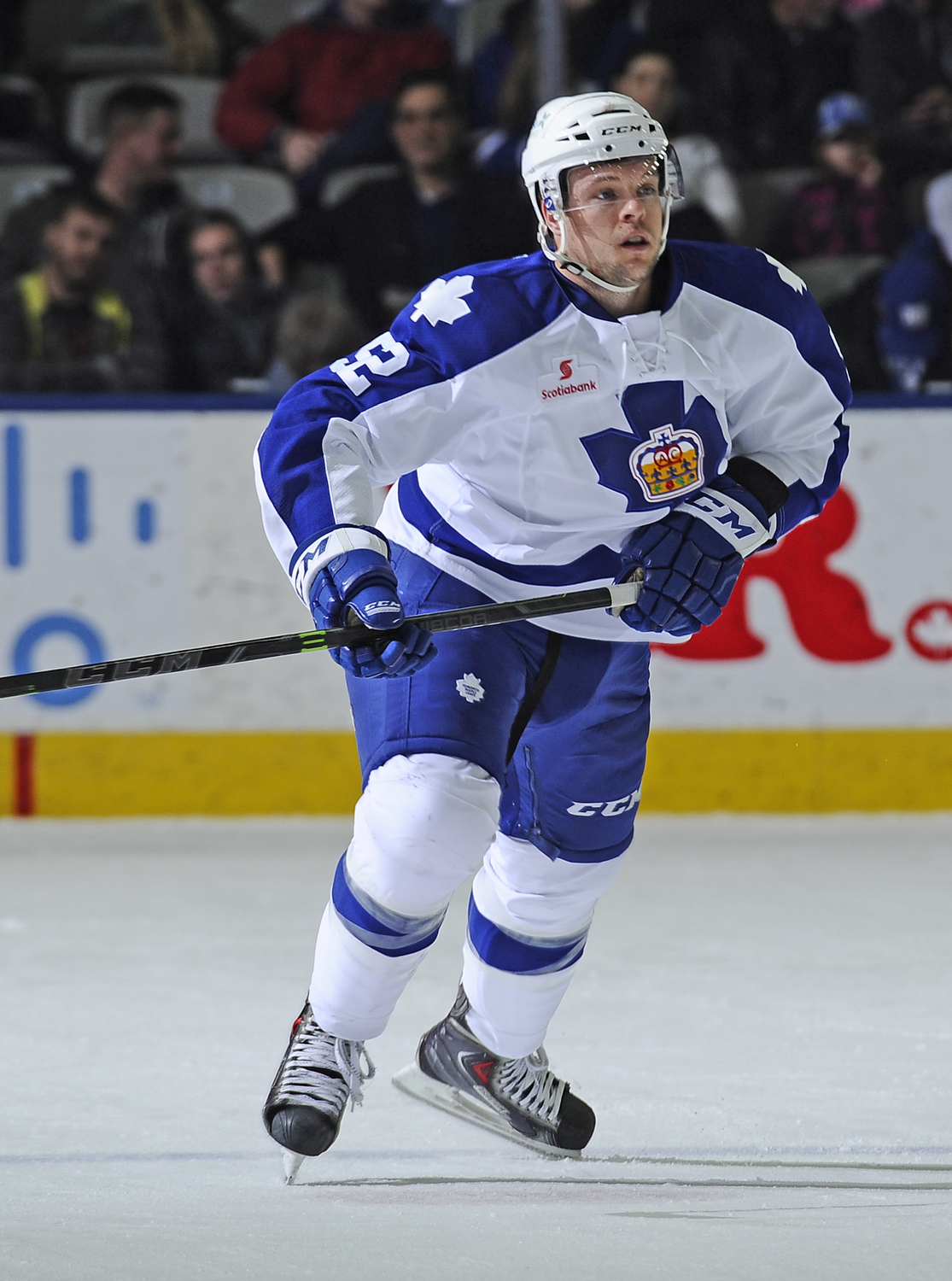
- Kessel with the Toronto Marlies
- Born: April 13, 1989 (age 37) Verona, Wisconsin, U.S.
- Height: 6 ft 2 in (188 cm)
- Weight: 210 lb (95 kg; 15 st 0 lb)
- Position: Defense
- Shot: Right
- Played for: Adirondack Phantoms; Rockford IceHogs; Rochester Americans; Toronto Marlies; Ilves; Augsburger Panther; Milwaukee Admirals; HC Kosice
- NHL draft: 166th overall, 2007; New York Islanders
- Playing career: 2011–2020

Blake Kessel (born April 13, 1989) is an American former professional ice hockey defenseman who most recently was coaching Ironbound Elite 16U Premier in the USA Hockey Women's 16U AA. He most recently played for the Orlando Solar Bears in the ECHL. He was selected by the New York Islanders in the 6th round (166th overall) of the 2007 NHL entry draft.

== Playing career ==
Kessel has been described as an offensive minded defenseman, who likes to join the offensive rush, which has been attributed to his speed and skill.

In Kessel's first season with the Waterloo Black Hawks, he played in 59 games, scoring 11 goals and accumulating 27 assists, for a total of 38 points. In his last season with the Black Hawks, Kessel led all defensemen in scoring with 57 points, scoring 19 goals and notching 38 assists in 59 games. Continuing the season to the playoffs, Kessel played in 11 games, adding 10 assists and 1 goal, for a total of 11 points.

Kessel signed an entry-level contract with the Philadelphia Flyers on September 14, 2011. After spending two seasons playing for the team's minor league affiliates, the Adirondack Phantoms of the AHL and the Trenton Titans of the ECHL, the Flyers did not give Kessel a qualifying offer, making him an unrestricted free agent.

On October 22, 2013, Kessel signed with the Bakersfield Condors.

On September 28, 2014, the Toronto Marlies announced that they had signed Kessel to an AHL contract. He was assigned to the Orlando Solar Bears, the Leafs' ECHL affiliate, on October 12, 2014. Kessel then landed a job in Finland and finished the 2014–15 season with Tampereen Ilves. He remained on the Ilves team until February 2016 and then took up an offer from German top-tier club Augsburger Panther, signing a contract until the end of the 2015–16 season.

In the following off-season, Kessel returned to North America to continue in the ECHL, signing a one-year deal with the Atlanta Gladiators on September 27, 2016. Tallying seven goals and 16 assists in 22 games for the Atlanta team, he was the league's top-scoring defenseman, when he was traded to the Kalamazoo Wings on November 28, 2016. On December 3, 2016 Kessel was signed to a professional tryout contract by the Milwaukee Admirals of the AHL. He appeared in 8 games with the Admirals before he was returned to the Wings.

In 2017, Kessel signed with HC Košice of the Tipsort liga in Slovakia. After playing with the HC Košice for a season, Kessel joined the ECHL's Jacksonville Icemen for their 2018–19 training camp. On February 17, 2019 Kessel was traded from Jacksonville to the Maine Mariners.

== International play ==
Medal record

Ice hockey

Representing United States

World Junior A Challenge
Bronze medal – third place	2007 Trail	

Kessel landed a spot on the US roster for the 2009 U20 World Championships. In November 2015, he played for Team USA at the Deutschland-Cup in Augsburg.

== Personal life ==
Kessel was born to Phil (Sr.) and Kathy Kessel in Madison, Wisconsin.

He attended the University of New Hampshire, where he majored in sports studies and played with the New Hampshire Wildcats men's ice hockey program.

Kessel comes from a family of professional athletes. His father played football for the Washington Redskins of the National Football League and the Calgary Stampeders of the Canadian Football League. His brother, Phil Kessel, is the NHL "Ironman", having played over 1,000 consecutive regular season games, and is a three-time Stanley Cup champion. His sister, Amanda Kessel, plays for the United States women's national ice hockey team and is a three-time Olympic medalist. His cousin, David Moss, previously played in the NHL for the Arizona Coyotes and the Calgary Flames.

Kessel is married to Courtney Birchard-Kessel, a former star of the New Hampshire Wildcats and Brampton Thunder and a three-time IIHF Women's World Championship medallist as a member of the Canadian national ice hockey team. She currently is the head coach of the Princeton women’s hockey.

== Career statistics ==
=== Regular season and playoffs ===
			Regular season					Playoffs
Season	Team	League	GP	G	A	Pts	PIM	GP	G	A	Pts	PIM
2005–06	Madison Capitols 18U AAA	18U AAA	62	33	47	80		—	—	—	—	—
2006–07	Waterloo Black Hawks	USHL	59	11	27	38	38	9	1	5	6	8
2007–08	Waterloo Black Hawks	USHL	59	19	38	57	26	11	1	10	11	12
2008–09	University of New Hampshire	HE	37	6	7	13	24	—	—	—	—	—
2009–10	University of New Hampshire	HE	38	10	28	38	28	—	—	—	—	—
2010–11	University of New Hampshire	HE	39	5	22	27	32	—	—	—	—	—
2011–12	Adirondack Phantoms	AHL	56	1	17	18	10	—	—	—	—	—
2012–13	Trenton Titans	ECHL	54	8	33	41	34	—	—	—	—	—
2012–13	Adirondack Phantoms	AHL	7	2	2	4	2	—	—	—	—	—
2013–14	Bakersfield Condors	ECHL	4	1	2	3	0	—	—	—	—	—
2013–14	Orlando Solar Bears	ECHL	43	7	26	33	28	6	2	0	2	9
2013–14	Rockford IceHogs	AHL	3	0	0	0	0	—	—	—	—	—
2013–14	Rochester Americans	AHL	8	0	2	2	4	—	—	—	—	—
2014–15	Orlando Solar Bears	ECHL	37	4	13	17	44	—	—	—	—	—
2014–15	Toronto Marlies	AHL	3	0	1	1	0	—	—	—	—	—
2014–15	Ilves	Liiga	10	3	2	5	0	2	0	0	0	2
2015–16	Ilves	Liiga	41	3	7	10	12	—	—	—	—	—
2015–16	Augsburger Panther	DEL	6	0	3	3	0	—	—	—	—	—
2016–17	Atlanta Gladiators	ECHL	22	7	16	23	8	—	—	—	—	—
2016–17	Kalamazoo Wings	ECHL	26	3	14	17	24	7	3	2	5	0
2016–17	Milwaukee Admirals	AHL	8	0	2	2	2	—	—	—	—	—
2017–18	HC Košice	SVK	54	7	18	25	6	5	0	1	1	0
2018–19	Jacksonville Icemen	ECHL	7	1	2	3	2	—	—	—	—	—
2018–19	Maine Mariners	ECHL	14	1	4	5	4	—	—	—	—	—
2019–20	Orlando Solar Bears	ECHL	22	3	4	7	12	—	—	—	—	—
AHL totals			85	3	24	27	18	—	—	—	—	—
ECHL totals			229	35	114	149	156	13	5	2	7	9

=== International ===
Year	Team	Event	Result	GP	G	A	Pts	PIM
2009	United States	WJC	5th	6	0	1	1	2
Junior totals				6	0	1	1	2

== Awards and honors ==
Award	Year
USHL Defenseman of the Year	2007–08
All-Hockey East First Team	2009–10
AHCA East Second-Team All-American	2009–10
All-Hockey East First Team	2010–11
AHCA East First-Team All-American	2010–11
