= Brandon Burlon =

Canadian ice hockey player (born 1990)

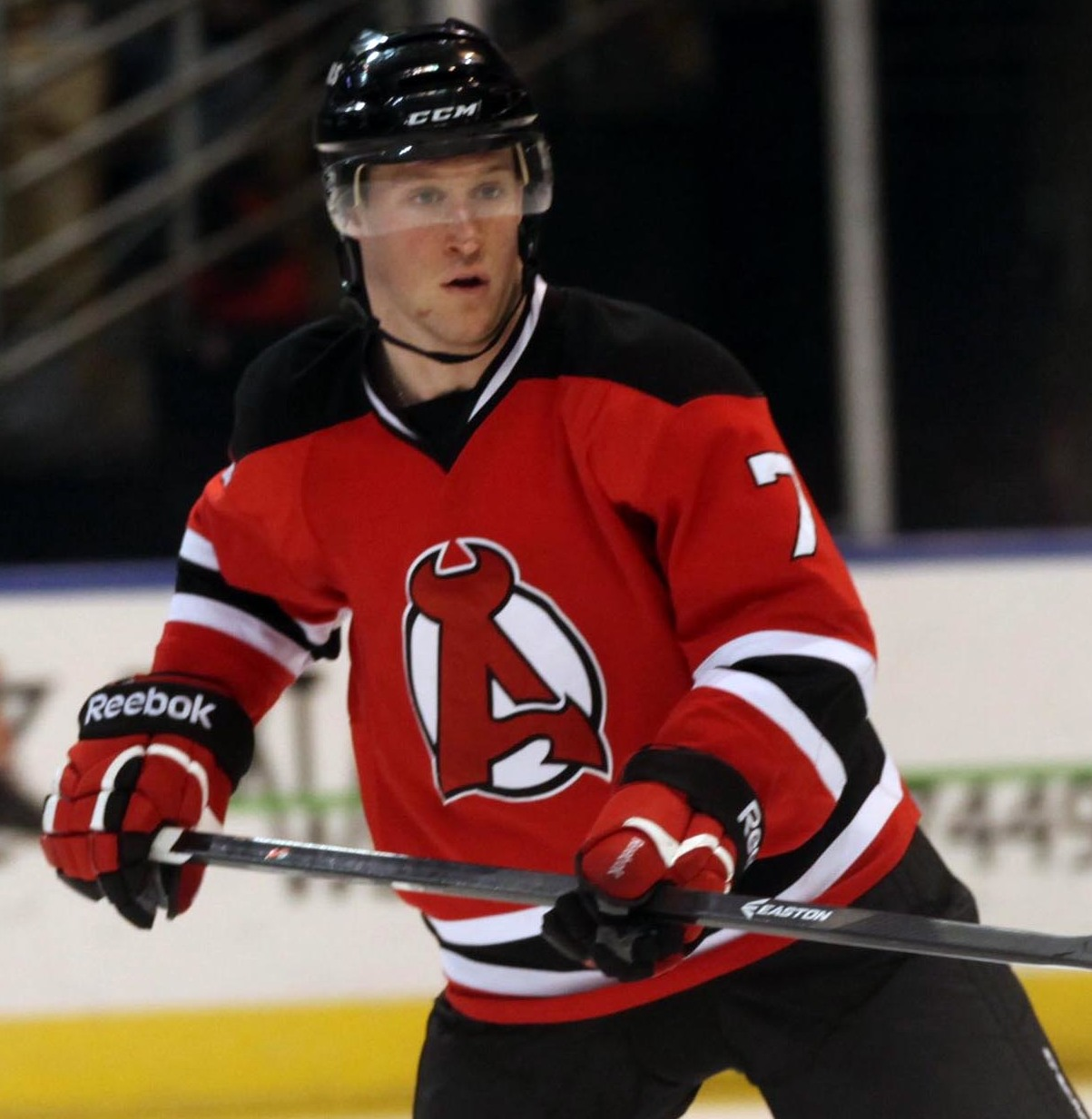
- Burlon with the Albany Devils in 2014
- Born: March 5, 1990 (age 36) Nobleton, Ontario, Canada
- Height: 6 ft 0 in (183 cm)
- Weight: 190 lb (86 kg; 13 st 8 lb)
- Position: Defence
- Shot: Left
- team Former teams: Free Agent; Albany Devils; Tucson Roadrunners
- NHL draft: 52nd overall, 2008; New Jersey Devils
- Playing career: 2011–2020

Medal record

Ice hockey

Representing Canada East

World Junior A Challenge
Silver medal – second place	2007 Trail	

Brandon Burlon (born March 5, 1990) is a Canadian former ice hockey defenceman. He was drafted by the New Jersey Devils of the National Hockey League (NHL) in the 2nd round (56th overall) of the 2008 NHL entry draft.

== Playing career ==
Burlon played junior hockey with St. Michael's Buzzers in the Ontario Junior Hockey League. In 2008, he moved to the United States to play college hockey with the University of Michigan Wolverines of the Central Collegiate Hockey Association (CCHA). In his first season with the Wolverines, he was honored by being selected to the 2008–09 CCHA All-Rookie Team. On June 2, 2011, Burlon signed an entry-level contract with the New Jersey Devils.

After five seasons with the Albany Devils of the AHL while within the Devils organization, Burlon left as a free agent following the 2015–16 season. On August 3, 2016, Burlon opted to continue his AHL career, signing a one-year deal with new AHL affiliate of the Arizona Coyotes, the Tucson Roadrunners. In signing, Burlon became the club's first addition to their inaugural season in 2016–17. In his season with the Roadrunners, Burlon was limited to just 33 games due to injury, recording 3 goals and 11 points.

As a free agent, Burlon embarked on a European career, agreeing to a one-year deal with German club, Düsseldorfer EG of the DEL on May 2, 2017. At the conclusion of his contract with DEG, Burlon continued his European career agreeing to a one-year deal with Norwegian club, Stavanger Oilers of the GET on July 26, 2018.

== Career statistics ==
			Regular season					Playoffs
Season	Team	League	GP	G	A	Pts	PIM	GP	G	A	Pts	PIM
2005–06	Vaughan Kings	GTHL	55	19	29	48	38	—	—	—	—	—
2006–07	St. Michael's Buzzers	OPJHL	45	4	19	23	46	4	0	1	1	4
2007–08	St. Michael's Buzzers	OPJHL	32	7	17	24	41	10	2	4	6	8
2008–09	University of Michigan	CCHA	33	5	10	15	14	—	—	—	—	—
2009–10	University of Michigan	CCHA	45	3	11	14	24	—	—	—	—	—
2010–11	University of Michigan	CCHA	38	5	13	18	28	—	—	—	—	—
2011–12	Albany Devils	AHL	57	1	8	9	21	—	—	—	—	—
2012–13	Albany Devils	AHL	53	1	16	17	25	—	—	—	—	—
2013–14	Albany Devils	AHL	54	5	6	11	39	—	—	—	—	—
2014–15	Albany Devils	AHL	72	8	28	36	93	—	—	—	—	—
2015–16	Albany Devils	AHL	56	4	17	21	56	—	—	—	—	—
2016–17	Tucson Roadrunners	AHL	33	3	8	11	39	—	—	—	—	—
2017–18	Düsseldorfer EG	DEL	51	3	8	11	32	—	—	—	—	—
2018–19	Stavanger Oilers	GET	30	5	22	27	73	8	0	1	1	33
2019–20	Västerviks IK	Allsv	29	0	0	0	24	—	—	—	—	—
2019–20	Orli Znojmo	EBEL	6	1	3	4	4	3	1	0	1	14
AHL totals			325	22	83	105	273	—	—	—	—	—

== Awards and honours ==
Award	Year
College
All-CCHA Rookie Team	2009
