= Drew LeBlanc =

American ice hockey player

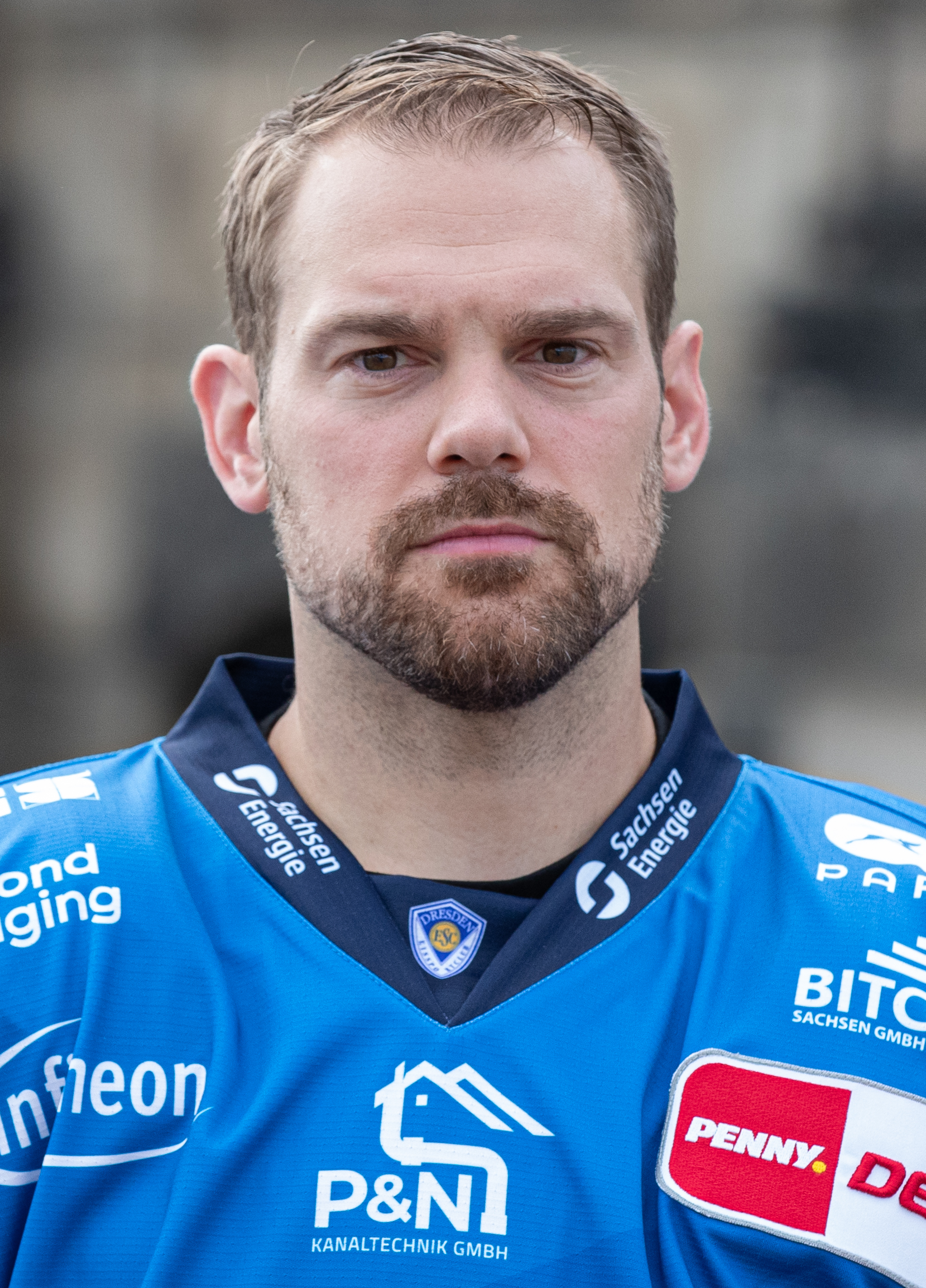
- LeBlanc in 2025
- Born: June 29, 1989 (age 37) Duluth, Minnesota, U.S.
- Height: 6 ft 0 in (183 cm)
- Weight: 195 lb (88 kg; 13 st 13 lb)
- Position: Center
- Shoots: Left
- DEL team Former teams: Iserlohn Roosters; Chicago Blackhawks; Augsburger Panther
- National team: United States
- NHL draft: Undrafted
- Playing career: 2013–present

Andrew John LeBlanc (born June 29, 1989) is an American professional ice hockey player currently playing for Iserlohn Roosters of the Deutsche Eishockey Liga (DEL). He won the Hobey Baker Award in 2013 as the top National Collegiate Athletic Association (NCAA) men's ice hockey player. LeBlanc was born in Duluth, Minnesota, but grew up in Hermantown, Minnesota.

== Playing career ==
LeBlanc played in the United States Hockey League with the Chicago Steel from 2006 until 2008, after which he began playing for St. Cloud State Huskies. Going into the 2011-2012 season LeBlanc was named Captain of the team but suffered an injury 10 games into his senior season at St. Cloud State. He was therefore allowed to be a Red shirt senior for the 2012-2013 and scored 50 points in 42 NCAA games, he also continued to serve as team captain. He won the 2013 Hobey Baker Award, which is given to the top college hockey player.

LeBlanc signed a one-year entry-level contract with the Chicago Blackhawks on April 12, 2013. He made his NHL debut on April 24, 2013, against the Edmonton Oilers and appeared in two games for the Blackhawks during the 2012–13 NHL season. As a result, the one-year contract that LeBlanc signed in April 2013, concluded on June 30, 2013, and LeBlanc became an unrestricted free agent. On July 19, 2013, he agreed to a two-year contract with the Blackhawks. He would spend the next two seasons playing for the Rockford IceHogs, the Blackhawks' American Hockey League affiliate.

Following the 2014–15 season, the Blackhawks did not extend a qualifying offer to LeBlanc. As a result, he became an unrestricted free agent. On July 10, 2015, LeBlanc signed a one-year contract with the Augsburger Panther of the DEL. He signed an extension with the team in March 2017.

Following eight seasons with Augsburg, LeBlanc left the club as a free agent and continued his career in the DEL by signing a one-year contract with Iserlohn Roosters for the 2023–24 season on July 7, 2023.

== International play ==
Medal record

Representing United States

Ice hockey

World Championships
Bronze medal – third place	2013 Sweden/Finland	

World Junior A Challenge
Bronze medal – third place	2007 Trail	

LeBlanc was selected to represent the United States at the 2013 IIHF World Championship.

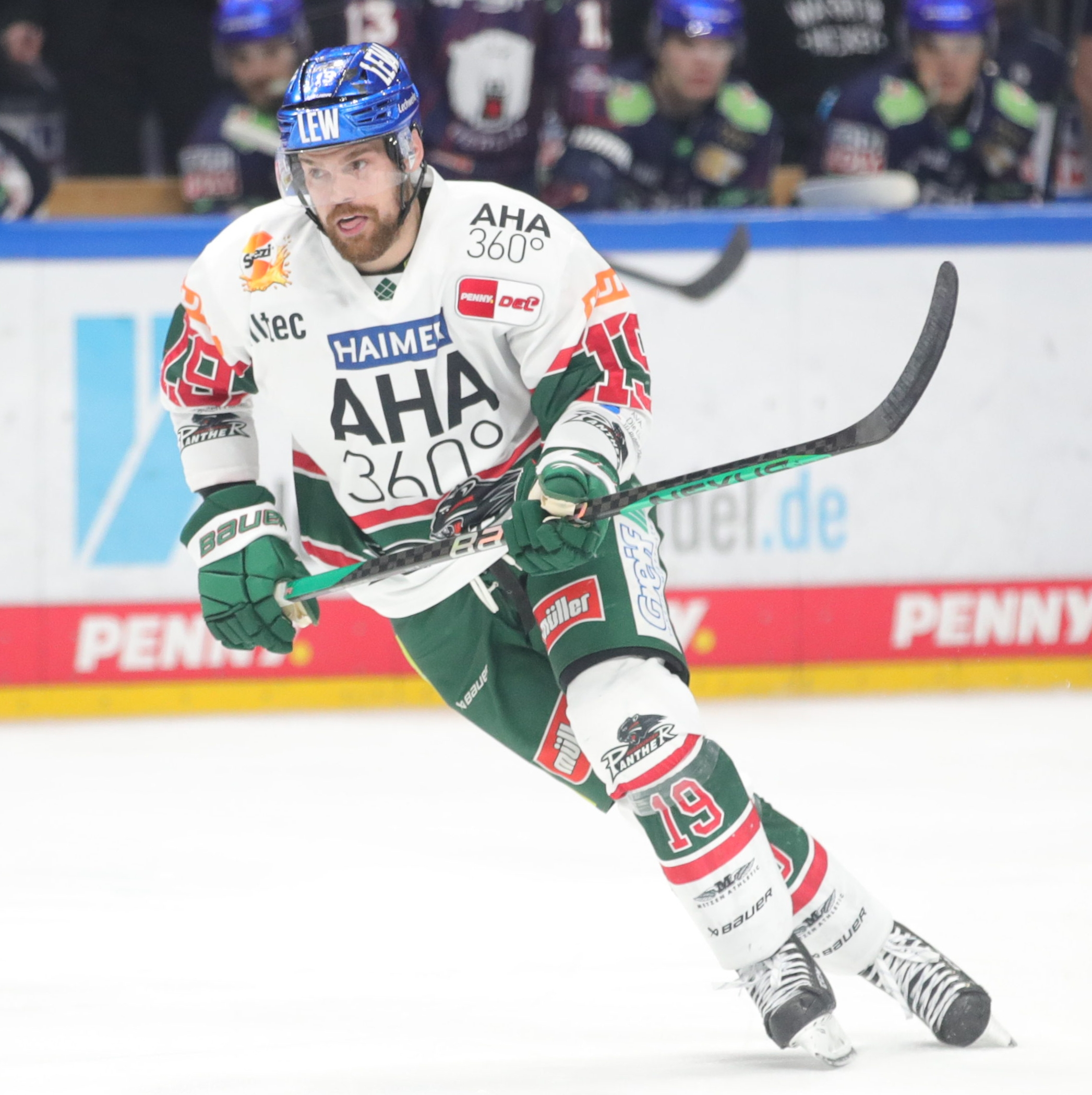
LeBlanc in 2023.

== Career statistics ==
=== Regular season and playoffs ===
			Regular season					Playoffs
Season	Team	League	GP	G	A	Pts	PIM	GP	G	A	Pts	PIM
2004–05	Hermantown High School	HS-MN	29	26	40	66		—	—	—	—	—
2005–06	Hermantown High School	HS-MN	29	26	40	66	15	—	—	—	—	—
2006–07	Hermantown High School	HS-MN	30	27	40	67	15	—	—	—	—	—
2006–07	Chicago Steel	USHL	14	0	5	5	20	5	0	2	2	4
2007–08	Chicago Steel	USHL	58	19	35	54	36	7	3	1	4	4
2008–09	St. Cloud State	WCHA	38	8	7	15	20	—	—	—	—	—
2009–10	St. Cloud State	WCHA	43	6	25	31	10	—	—	—	—	—
2010–11	St. Cloud State	WCHA	38	13	26	39	18	—	—	—	—	—
2011–12	St. Cloud State	WCHA	10	2	10	12	4	—	—	—	—	—
2012–13	St. Cloud State	WCHA	42	13	37	50	14	—	—	—	—	—
2012–13	Chicago Blackhawks	NHL	2	0	0	0	0	—	—	—	—	—
2013–14	Rockford IceHogs	AHL	76	7	15	22	18	—	—	—	—	—
2014–15	Rockford IceHogs	AHL	41	4	2	6	8	—	—	—	—	—
2015–16	Augsburger Panther	DEL	45	15	31	46	18	—	—	—	—	—
2016–17	Augsburger Panther	DEL	49	11	23	34	18	7	1	4	5	4
2017–18	Augsburger Panther	DEL	48	11	32	43	22	—	—	—	—	—
2018–19	Augsburger Panther	DEL	52	11	34	45	40	14	5	5	10	10
2019–20	Augsburger Panther	DEL	42	11	38	49	8	—	—	—	—	—
2020–21	Augsburger Panther	DEL	38	10	20	30	22	—	—	—	—	—
2021–22	Augsburger Panther	DEL	50	5	15	20	12	—	—	—	—	—
2022–23	Augsburger Panther	DEL	56	13	19	32	20	—	—	—	—	—
2023–24	Iserlohn Roosters	DEL	50	8	11	19	20	—	—	—	—	—
NHL totals			2	0	0	0	0	—	—	—	—	—
DEL totals			430	95	223	318	180	21	6	9	15	14

=== International ===
Year	Team	Event	Result	GP	G	A	Pts	PIM
2007	United States	WJAC	3rd place, bronze medalist(s)	4	1	1	2	2
2013	United States	WC	3rd place, bronze medalist(s)	6	0	3	3	0
Junior totals				4	1	1	2	2
Senior totals				6	0	3	3	0

== Awards and honors ==
Award	Year
College
All-WCHA Third Team	2010–11
All-WCHA First Team	2012–13
AHCA West First-Team All-American	2012–13
Hobey Baker Award	2012–13

Awards and achievements
Preceded by Jack Connolly	WCHA Player of the Year; 2012–13	Succeeded by Cody Kunyk
Preceded by Jack Connolly	Winner of the Hobey Baker Award; 2012–13	Succeeded by Johnny Gaudreau
Preceded by Brad Eidsness	WCHA Outstanding Student-Athlete of the Year; 2012–13	Succeeded by Chad Brears
