= Joe Colborne =

Canadian ice hockey player (born 1990)

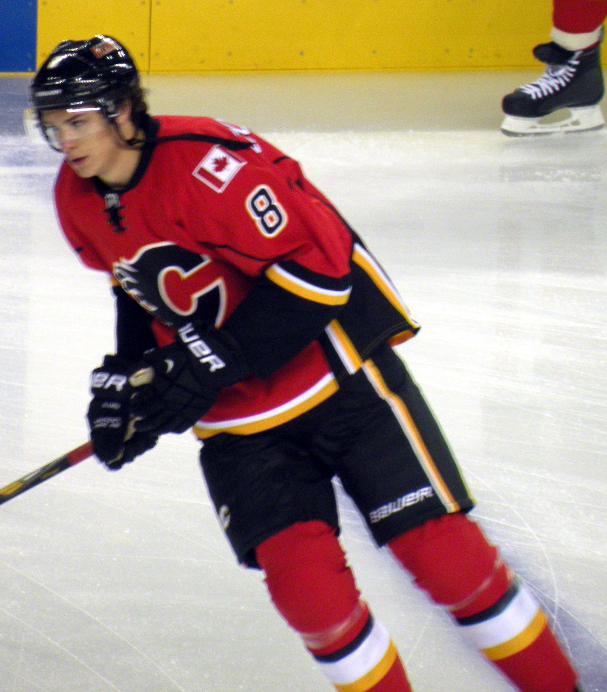
- Colborne with the Calgary Flames in 2013
- Born: January 30, 1990 (age 36) Calgary, Alberta, Canada
- Height: 6 ft 5 in (196 cm)
- Weight: 221 lb (100 kg; 15 st 11 lb)
- Position: Centre
- Shot: Left
- Played for: Toronto Maple Leafs; Calgary Flames; Colorado Avalanche
- NHL draft: 16th overall, 2008; Boston Bruins
- Playing career: 2010–2018

Joseph William Colborne (born January 30, 1990) is a Canadian former professional ice hockey forward. Colborne was a first round selection, 16th overall, of the Boston Bruins at the 2008 NHL entry draft, but never played for the team. He was traded to the Toronto Maple Leafs in 2011 and spent parts of three seasons in the Toronto organization before joining the Calgary Flames in a 2013 trade. After three seasons with the Flames, Colborne signed as a free agent with the Colorado Avalanche in the 2016 off-season. He played in the Avalanche organization for parts of two seasons before a concussion abruptly ended his career partway through the 2017–18 season.

== Early life ==
Colborne was born January 30, 1990, in Calgary, Alberta. His father Paul, an oil and gas executive and former football quarterback at the University of Calgary, encouraged his children's sporting pursuits; Joe grew up practicing his hockey skills on a backyard rink while his sisters Lauren, Melissa and Claire played basketball. In junior high he played AAA hockey for the Edge Mountaineers.

== Playing career ==
=== Junior and college ===
Standing five feet, nine inches tall as a 15-year-old, Colborne played a season of midget hockey with the Notre Dame Hounds in Wilcox, Saskatchewan, before being recruited by the Camrose Kodiaks of the Alberta Junior Hockey League (AJHL). He played two seasons in Camrose between 2006 and 2008 and scored 53 goals and 138 points in 108 games. The Kodiaks won the AJHL championship both seasons and reached the Royal Bank Cup national championship each year; they lost the semi-final in 2007 and the final in 2008. Colborne was named the Canadian Junior A Hockey League Player of the Year in 2007–08 following a 33-goal, 90-point season with Camrose. Having grown to six feet, five inches tall by the time he was 18, Colborne was selected in the first round, 16th overall, by the Boston Bruins at the 2008 NHL entry draft. In doing so, he became only the second first round selection in the AJHL's history, following Brent Sutter (17th overall in 1980). Colborne also committed to play college hockey for the University of Denver Pioneers.

As a freshman in 2008–09, Colborne appeared in 40 games and scored 10 goals to go along with 21 assists. The Pioneers named him the co-recipient, along with Patrick Wiercioch, of the Barry Sharp Freshman of the Year Award, and was named the Western Collegiate Hockey Association (WCHA) Rookie Team as a forward. Colborne improved to 41 points as a sophomore in 2009–10 and led the team with 22 goals. He was named a WCHA Third-Team All-Star, and the Pioneers won the MacNaughton Cup as WCHA regular season champions.

The Pioneers' were upset by the RIT Tigers in the first round of the 2010 NCAA Division I Men's Ice Hockey Tournament. Following the loss, Colborne chose to forgo his final two years of college eligibility and signed a three-year contract with the Bruins. He was assigned to the American Hockey League (AHL)'s Providence Bruins to complete the season where he recorded two assists in six games.

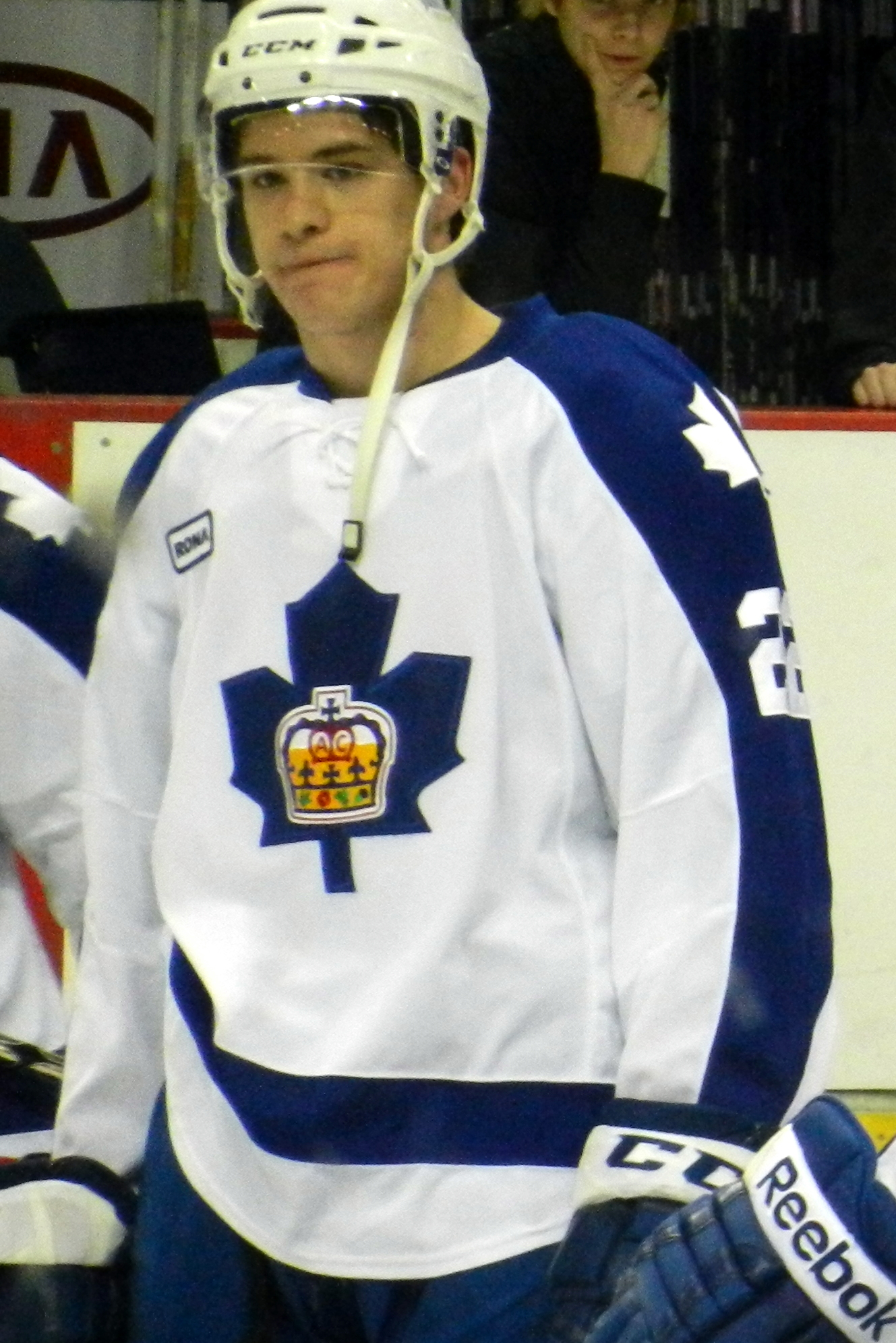
Colborne as a member of the Toronto Marlies.

=== Professional ===
Colborne joined Providence full-time for the 2010–11 AHL season and the Bruins projected that he could become a player capable of playing on the top two lines at either centre or wing.

==== Toronto Maple Leafs ====
However, after appearing in 55 games for Providence in which he scored 12 goals and 26 points, Colborne was sent, along with two draft picks, to the Toronto Maple Leafs in exchange for Tomáš Kaberle on February 19, 2011. The Maple Leafs assigned him to their AHL affiliate, the Toronto Marlies, where he played an additional 20 games. He was recalled to Toronto for the final game of the 2010–11 NHL season and made his NHL debut on April 9, 2011. He recorded his first point in the game, assisting on Phil Kessel's goal in a 4–1 loss to the Montreal Canadiens.

Colborne spent the majority of the 2011–12 season with the Marlies; he appeared in 69 AHL games and recorded 39 points. He also appeared in 10 games with the Maple Leafs and scored his first NHL goal on November 22, 2011, against goaltender Dwayne Roloson of the Tampa Bay Lightning. Colborne spent the majority of the 2012–13 AHL season with the Marlies, where he improved to 42 points in 65 games. He also appeared in five NHL games with Toronto.

==== Calgary Flames ====
During training camp prior to the start of the 2013–14 season, Colborne was again traded. The Maple leafs sent him to the Calgary Flames on September 29, 2013, in exchange for a fourth round selection at the 2014 NHL entry draft. Colborne was excited to be dealt to his hometown team and described former players Al MacInnis, Joe Nieuwendyk and Jarome Iginla as his heroes; "So to have the opportunity to come back and put on the C is pretty special. I've grown up since I was three or four years old wanting to play for the Flames". In his first full NHL season, Colborne played 80 games, scored 10 goals and added 18 assists.

While he was a restricted free agent prior to the 2014–15 season, Colborne and the Flames avoided a scheduled arbitration hearing and agreed to a two-year, $2.55 million contract.

In the final year of his contract with the Flames in the 2015–16 season, despite being unable to help Calgary return to the playoffs Colborne's versatility shone through among the Flames forward lines, establishing career highs across the board with 19 goals, 25 assists and 44 points in 73 games.

==== Colorado Avalanche ====
In the following off-season, Colborne, a restricted free agent, was surprisingly not issued a qualifying offer by the Calgary Flames. On July 1, 2016, the opening day of free agency, Colborne opted to return to his collegiate roots in Denver, signing a two-year, $5 million contract with the Colorado Avalanche. In opening the 2016–17 season, Colborne made an instant impact in his Avalanche debut, recording his first career NHL hat-trick, in a 6–5 victory over the Dallas Stars on October 15, 2016. Brought in to provide versatility in a checking-line role, Colborne failed to build upon his initial success adding just one goal over the following 61 games to finish with a career-worst 4 goals and 8 points as the Avalanche endured a last-place finish.

In the lead-up to the Avalanche's 2017 training camp, Colborne efforts for a rebound year were hampered after suffering a back injury that ruled out his participation in camp and the preseason. He was named on the Avalanche's opening roster for the 2017–18 season, but was placed on waivers the following day on October 4, 2017. Colborne went unclaimed and was reassigned to the AHL, for the first time since 2013, linking up with the San Antonio Rampage on October 5, 2017. Colborne appeared in just 13 games with the Rampage before he was ruled out for the remainder of the season due to injury.

== Career statistics ==
			Regular season					Playoffs
Season	Team	League	GP	G	A	Pts	PIM	GP	G	A	Pts	PIM
2006–07	Camrose Kodiaks	AJHL	53	20	28	48	44	—	—	—	—	—
2007–08	Camrose Kodiaks	AJHL	55	33	57	90	48	—	—	—	—	—
2008–09	University of Denver	WCHA	40	10	21	31	24	—	—	—	—	—
2009–10	University of Denver	WCHA	39	22	19	41	30	—	—	—	—	—
2009–10	Providence Bruins	AHL	12	5	5	10	8	—	—	—	—	—
2010–11	Providence Bruins	AHL	55	12	14	26	35	—	—	—	—	—
2010–11	Toronto Marlies	AHL	20	8	8	16	8	—	—	—	—	—
2010–11	Toronto Maple Leafs	NHL	1	0	1	1	0	—	—	—	—	—
2011–12	Toronto Marlies	AHL	65	16	23	39	46	15	2	6	8	8
2011–12	Toronto Maple Leafs	NHL	10	1	4	5	4	—	—	—	—	—
2012–13	Toronto Marlies	AHL	65	14	28	42	53	4	0	1	1	2
2012–13	Toronto Maple Leafs	NHL	5	0	0	0	2	2	0	0	0	0
2013–14	Calgary Flames	NHL	80	10	18	28	34	—	—	—	—	—
2014–15	Calgary Flames	NHL	64	8	20	28	43	11	1	2	3	20
2015–16	Calgary Flames	NHL	73	19	25	44	27	—	—	—	—	—
2016–17	Colorado Avalanche	NHL	62	4	4	8	34	—	—	—	—	—
2017–18	San Antonio Rampage	AHL	13	2	2	4	4	—	—	—	—	—
AHL totals			224	52	77	129	148	19	2	7	9	8
NHL totals			295	42	72	114	144	13	1	2	3	20

Medal record

Ice hockey

Representing Canada West

World Junior A Challenge
Gold medal – first place	2007 Trail	

== Awards and honours ==
Award	Year
AJHL
Playoff Champion	2008
College
All-WCHA Rookie Team	2009
All-WCHA Third Team	2010
All-WCHA Academic Team	2010

Awards and achievements
Preceded by Zach Hamill	Boston Bruins first-round draft pick 2008	Succeeded by Jordan Caron
