= Klementjevs =

Klementjevs is a Latvian surname, Russian Klementyev. Notable people with the surname include:

- Andrejs Klementjevs (born 1973), Latvian politician
- Jefimijs Klementjevs (born 1963), Latvian politician and canoer
- Ivans Klementjevs (born 1960), Latvian politician and canoer
