= Sören Sturm =

German ice hockey player

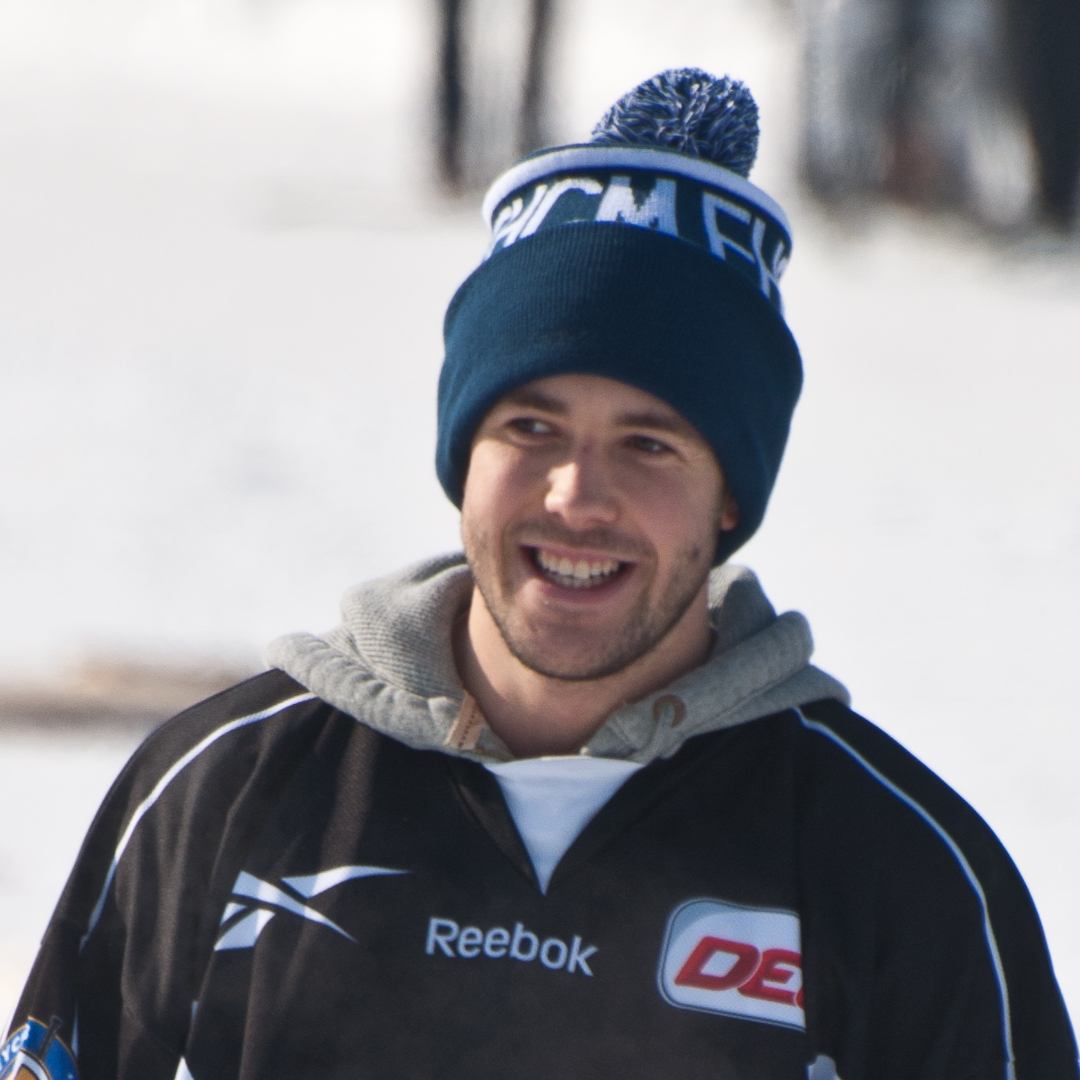
- Born: December 15, 1989 (age 35); Köln, West Germany
- Height: 6 ft 0 in (183 cm)
- Weight: 176 lb (80 kg; 12 st 8 lb)
- Position: Defence
- Shoots: Right
- DEL team Former teams: Free Agent; Kölner Haie; EHC München; Straubing Tigers
- NHL draft: Undrafted
- Playing career: 2006–present

Sören Sturm (born December 15, 1989) is a German professional ice hockey defenceman. He is currently an unrestricted free agent who most recently played for Straubing Tigers in the Deutsche Eishockey Liga (DEL). Sturm previously played with EHC München. On April 19, 2013, Sturm left Red Bull München off contract and signed a two-year deal with fellow DEL competitors, the Straubing Tigers.
