= Mike Connolly (ice hockey) =

Canadian ice hockey player

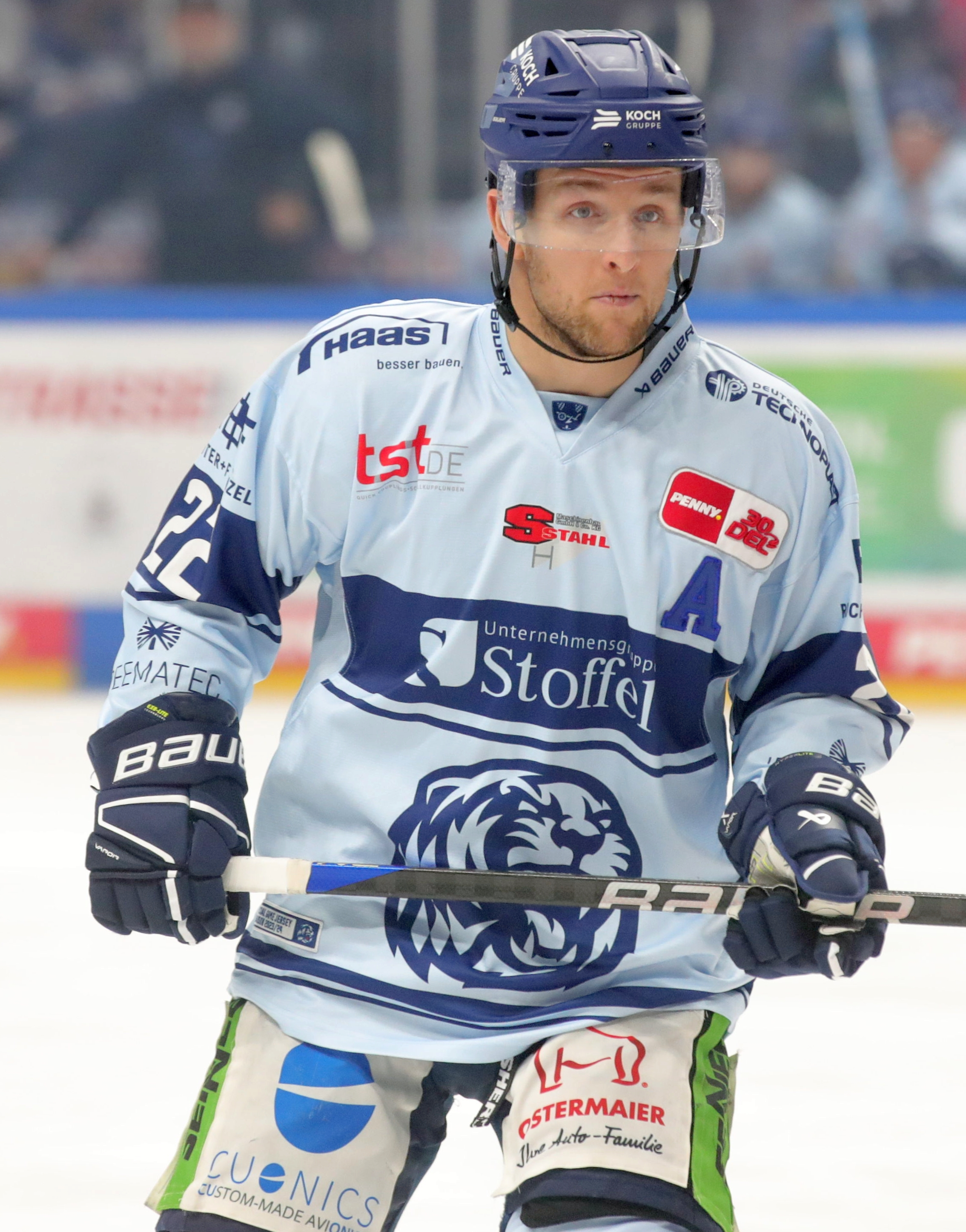
- Mike Connolly in 2023
- Born: July 3, 1989 (age 37) Calgary, Alberta, Canada
- Height: 5 ft 9 in (175 cm)
- Weight: 180 lb (82 kg; 12 st 12 lb)
- Position: Centre
- Shot: Left
- Played for: Colorado Avalanche; Augsburger Panther; Straubing Tigers
- NHL draft: Undrafted
- Playing career: 2011–2026

Michael Brian Connolly (born July 3, 1989) is a Canadian former professional ice hockey forward. Connolly played in the National Hockey League for the Colorado Avalanche and in the Deutsche Eishockey Liga (DEL) with Augsburger Panther and Straubing Tigers.

== Playing career ==
Undrafted, after playing junior hockey in the AJHL for the Camrose Kodiaks, Connolly attended the University of Minnesota-Duluth in the Western Collegiate Hockey Association. Named to the WCHA All-Rookie Team after the 2008-09 season, Connolly remained on a point-per-game average through his sophomore season. In his Junior year, he led the Bulldogs with 54 points in 42 game en route to the NCAA Championship and a WCHA First All-Star Team selection.

On April 13, 2011, shortly after his team won the Championship, Connolly signed a three-year entry-level contract with the San Jose Sharks of the National Hockey League.

In his first professional season in 2011–12, Connolly was assigned to the Sharks American Hockey League affiliate, the Worcester Sharks. He led Worcester rookies with 30 points in 40 games before he was dealt by San Jose at the trade deadline on February 27, 2012, to the Colorado Avalanche, along with Jamie McGinn and Michael Sgarbossa in exchange for Daniel Winnik, TJ Galiardi and a seventh round selection. He was then assigned to the Avalanche's AHL affiliate, the Lake Erie Monsters. After two games with the Monsters, Connolly was unexpectedly recalled by the Avalanche and made his NHL debut against the Minnesota Wild in a 2-0 victory on March 4, 2012.

After off-season knee surgery, Connolly missed the start of the 2012–13 season with the Lake Erie Monsters. As a result, Connolly struggled offensively upon his return until the latter portion of the season to contribute with 9 goals for 23 points in 65 games. His rights were not retained by Colorado and he was released as a free agent at the conclusion of his contract.

On July 18, 2013, Connolly was signed to his first European contract, on a one-year deal with German club, Augsburger Panther. In his first European season in 2013–14, Connolly quickly adapted to the larger ice and cemented his position as center on the top scoring line for Augsburg. Despite missing out on the post-season, Connolly lead the team with 28 assists and placed second in points with 42 to re-sign to a one-year extension on February 23, 2014.

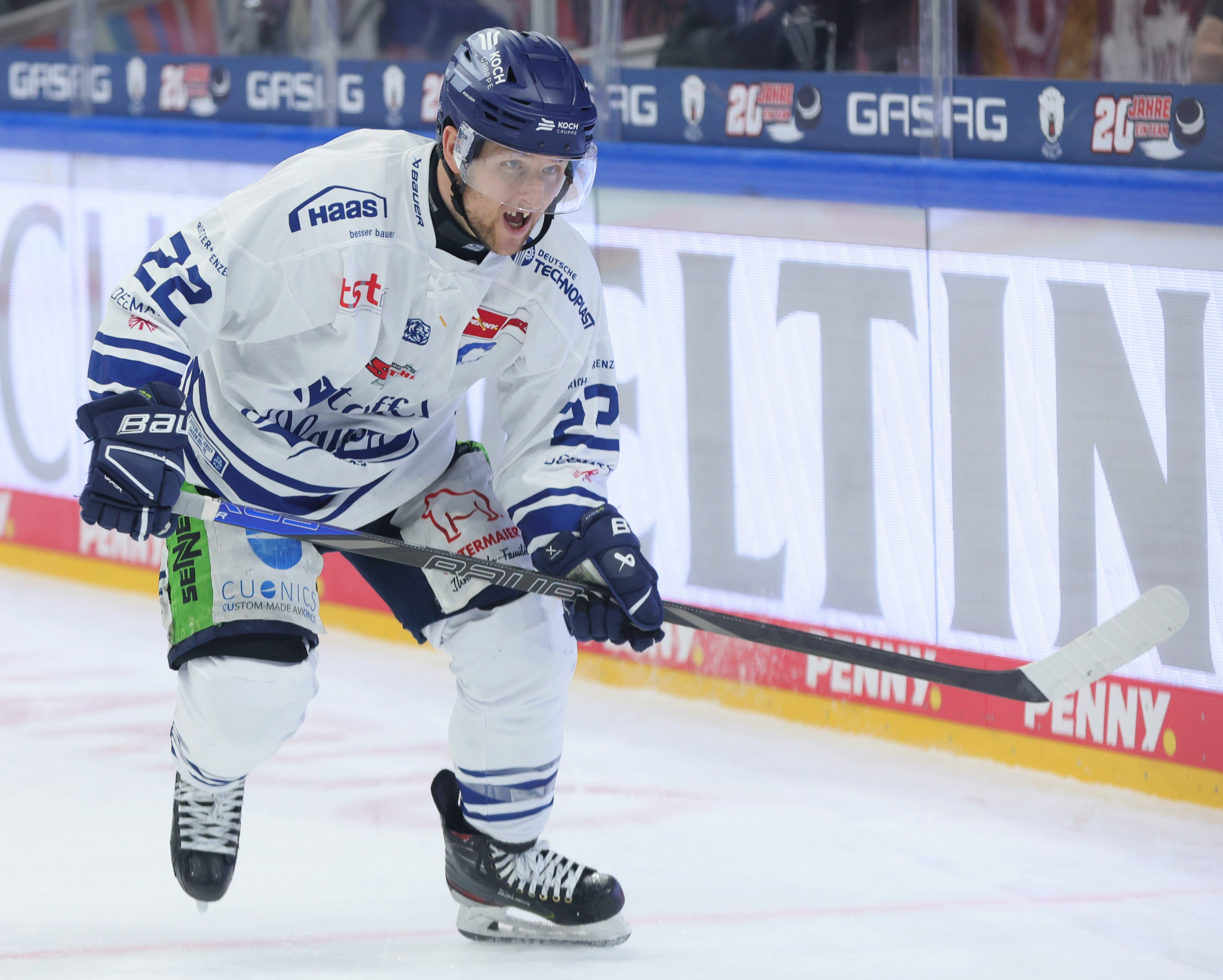
Connolly with the Straubign Tigers in 2025

In the following 2014–15 season, Connolly was limited to 22 games due to a cruciate ligament injury, and was unable to reproduce his initial success in the DEL. After finishing with 11 points, Connolly left as a free agent and signed a one-year contract with fellow DEL club, the Straubing Tigers on March 26, 2015.

Following his 11th season with the Straubing Tigers, Connolly announced his retirement from his 15 year professional career on May 2, 2026.

== Career statistics ==
			Regular season					Playoffs
Season	Team	League	GP	G	A	Pts	PIM	GP	G	A	Pts	PIM
2006–07	Camrose Kodiaks	AJHL	47	18	30	48	79	17	7	13	20	28
2007–08	Camrose Kodiaks	AJHL	37	25	41	66	39	12	3	5	8	38
2008–09	U. of Minnesota-Duluth	WCHA	43	13	29	42	53	—	—	—	—	—
2009–10	U. of Minnesota-Duluth	WCHA	37	14	26	40	24	—	—	—	—	—
2010–11	U. of Minnesota-Duluth	WCHA	42	28	26	54	59	—	—	—	—	—
2011–12	Worcester Sharks	AHL	40	10	20	30	26	—	—	—	—	—
2011–12	Lake Erie Monsters	AHL	13	3	4	7	4	—	—	—	—	—
2011–12	Colorado Avalanche	NHL	2	0	0	0	2	—	—	—	—	—
2012–13	Lake Erie Monsters	AHL	65	9	14	23	21	—	—	—	—	—
2013–14	Augsburger Panther	DEL	52	14	28	42	76	—	—	—	—	—
2014–15	Augsburger Panther	DEL	22	4	7	11	30	—	—	—	—	—
2015–16	Straubing Tigers	DEL	49	8	27	35	48	7	0	0	0	6
2016–17	Straubing Tigers	DEL	52	9	39	48	53	2	0	1	1	0
2017–18	Straubing Tigers	DEL	47	12	30	42	44	—	—	—	—	—
2018–19	Straubing Tigers	DEL	52	15	37	52	36	2	0	0	0	8
2019–20	Straubing Tigers	DEL	52	14	31	45	50	—	—	—	—	—
2020–21	Straubing Tigers	DEL	23	1	4	5	16	—	—	—	—	—
2021–22	Straubing Tigers	DEL	53	19	34	53	38	4	1	1	2	0
2022–23	Straubing Tigers	DEL	50	16	22	38	33	7	3	1	4	0
2023–24	Straubing Tigers	DEL	52	11	34	45	35	12	1	11	12	6
2024–25	Straubing Tigers	DEL	43	11	21	32	12	7	1	3	4	0
2025–26	Straubing Tigers	DEL	19	3	7	10	6	6	1	3	4	4
NHL totals			2	0	0	0	2	—	—	—	—	—
DEL totals			566	137	321	458	477	47	7	20	27	24

Medal record

Ice hockey

Representing Canada West

World Junior A Challenge
Gold medal – first place	2007 Trail	

== Awards and honors ==
Award	Year
International
World Junior A Challenge Most Valuable Player	2007
College
WCHA All-Rookie Team	2008–09
WCHA All-Tournament Team	2009
All-WCHA First Team	2010–11
