= Andreas Tanzer =

German ice hockey player (born 1989)

- Born: April 3, 1989 (age 36) Garmisch-Partenkirchen, GER
- Height: 6 ft 1 in (185 cm)
- Weight: 185 lb (84 kg; 13 st 3 lb)
- Position: Goaltender
- Catches: Left
- GER.4 team: ESC Dorfen
- Playing career: 2007–present

Andreas Tanzer (born April 3, 1989) is a German professional ice hockey goaltender who currently plays for ESC Dorfen of the Bavarian fourth tier league.
