= Magomed Gimbatov =

Russian ice hockey player

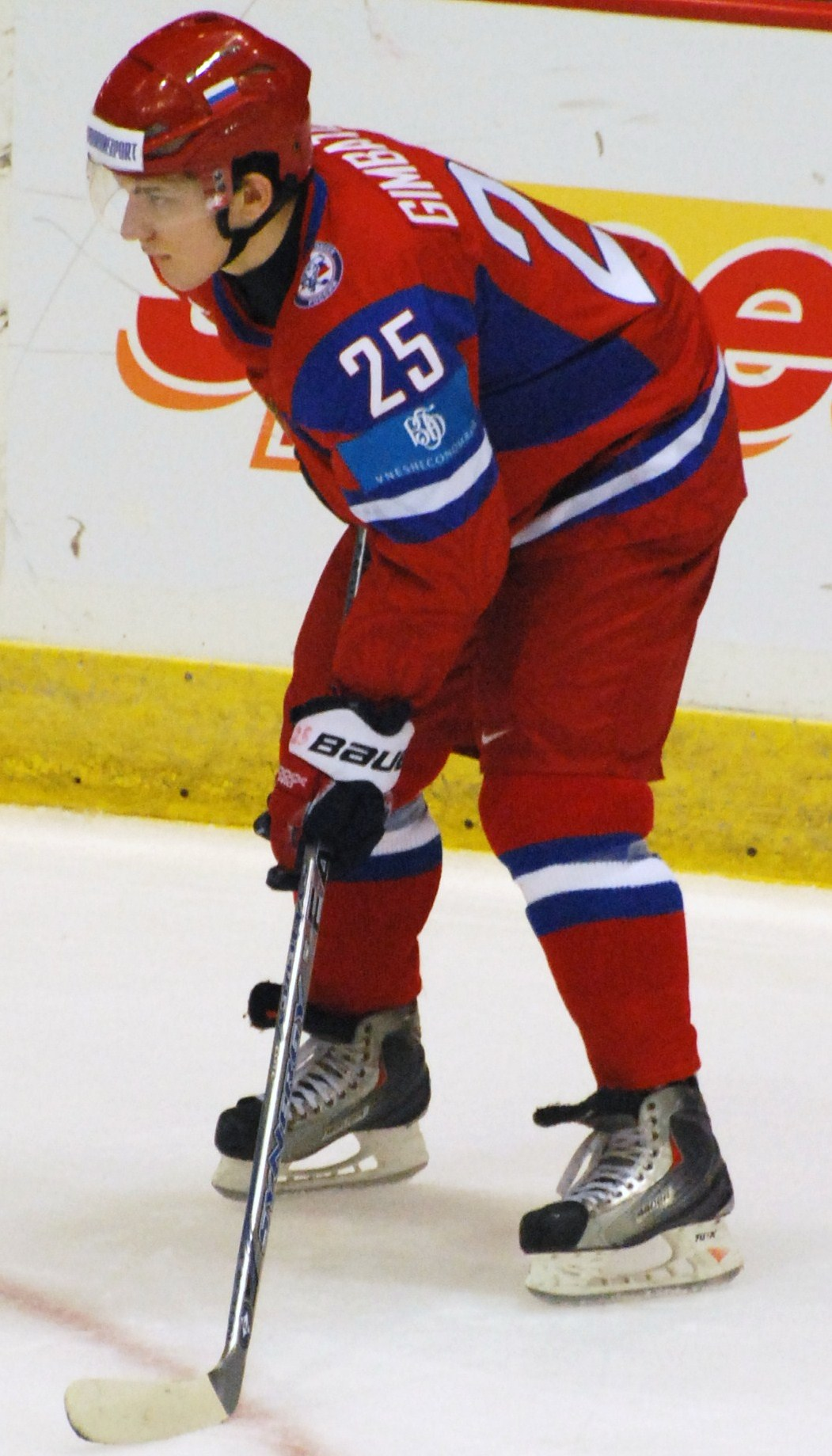
- Gimbatov in 2009
- Born: November 11, 1990 (age 35) Gogotl, Russian SFSR
- Height: 6 ft 0 in (183 cm)
- Weight: 192 lb (87 kg; 13 st 10 lb)
- Position: Forward
- Shoots: Left
- VHL team Former teams: SKA-Neva; Metallurg Novokuznetsk; SKA Saint Petersburg; HC Vityaz; San Francisco Bulls
- NHL draft: Undrafted
- Playing career: 2008–present

Magomed Asadaliyevich Gimbatov (Russian: Магомед Асадалиевич Гимбатов; born November 11, 1990) is a Russian professional ice hockey player. He is currently playing with SKA-Neva of the Supreme Hockey League (VHL).

Gimbatov made his Kontinental Hockey League debut playing with Metallurg Novokuznetsk during the inaugural 2008–09 KHL season.
