= Etienne Renkewitz =

German ice hockey player

- Position: Goaltender
- DEL team: DEG Metro Stars

Etienne Renkewitz is a German professional ice hockey goaltender who currently plays for DEG Metro Stars of the Deutsche Eishockey Liga (DEL).
