= Anton Klementyev =

Russian ice hockey player

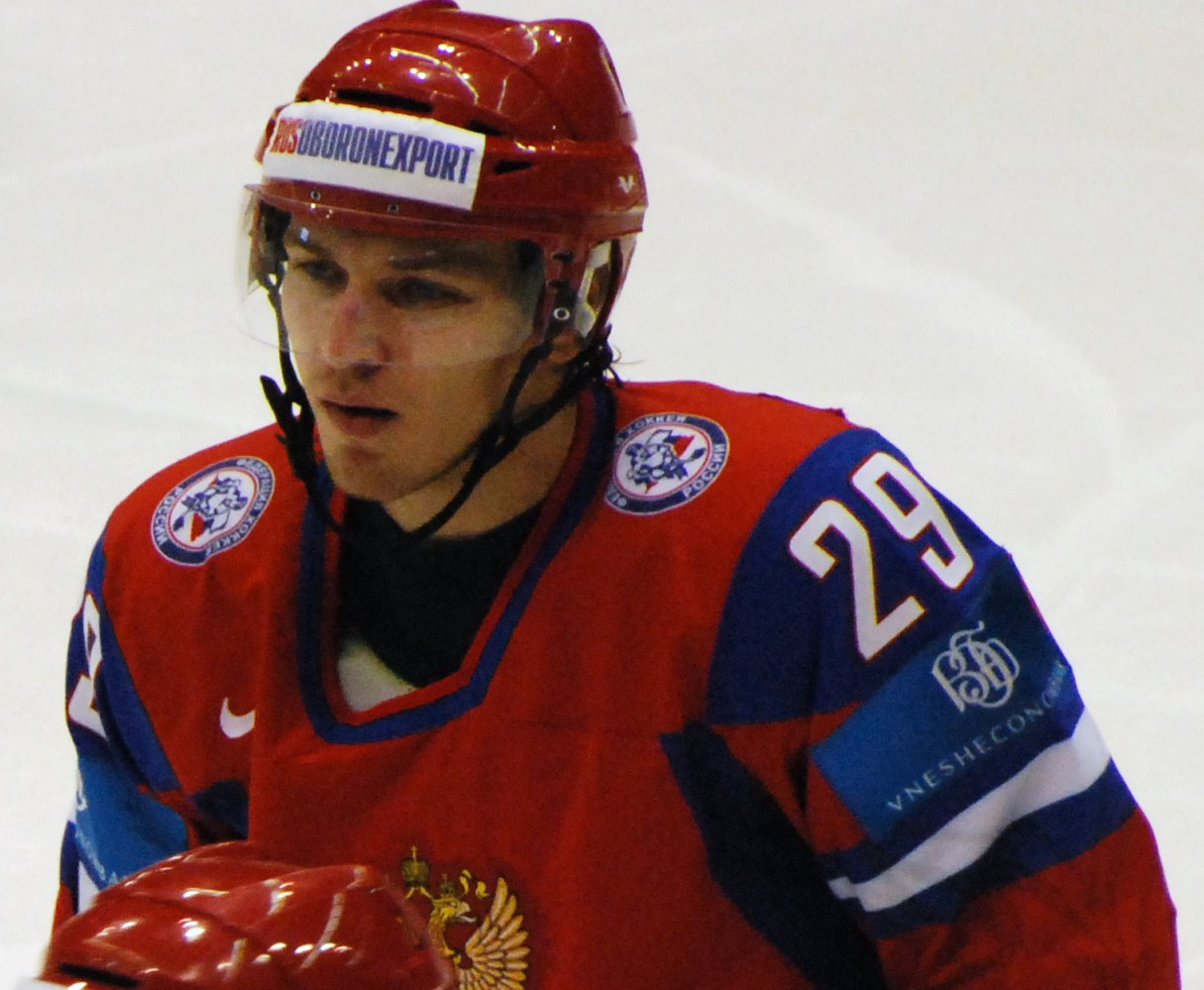
- Klementyev in 2009
- Born: 25 March 1990 (age 36) Togliatti, Russian SFSR, Soviet Union
- Height: 6 ft 1 in (185 cm)
- Weight: 207 lb (94 kg; 14 st 11 lb)
- Position: Defense
- Shot: Right
- Played for: Lokomotiv Yaroslavl; New York Islanders; Naprzód Janów; KH Sanok; HK Gomel
- NHL draft: 122nd overall, 2009; New York Islanders
- Playing career: 2008–2017

Anton Sergeevich Klementyev (Russian: Антон Сергеевич Клементьев; born 25 March 1990) is a Russian former ice hockey defenseman. He played one game for the New York Islanders of the National Hockey League in 2010. The rest of his career, which lasted from 2005 to 2017, was mainly spent in Russia.

== Playing career ==
Klementyev was originally selected 122nd overall by the New York Islanders in the 2009 NHL entry draft. He made his NHL debut with the Islanders on 27 March 2010 against the Columbus Blue Jackets. He was drafted by the Islanders in the 5th round (122nd overall) of the 2009 NHL entry draft.

Before joining the Islanders, he spent most of the season playing for the Bridgeport Sound Tigers of the American Hockey League. He also played for Russia at the 2010 World Junior Ice Hockey Championships.

On 3 February 2012, the New York Islanders placed Anton Klementyev on unconditional waivers. Between 2012 and 2014, he played in the Russian VHL, before moving to the Polish Hockey League for one year, finishing his career with two seasons in the Belarus Extraliga before retiring in 2017.

== Career statistics ==
=== Regular season and playoffs ===
			Regular season					Playoffs
Season	Team	League	GP	G	A	Pts	PIM	GP	G	A	Pts	PIM
2005–06	Spartak Moscow-2	RUS-3	2	0	0	0	0	—	—	—	—	—
2005–06	Spartak Moscow	MosJHL	12	1	8	9	6	—	—	—	—	—
2006–07	Lokomotiv Yaroslavl-2	RUS-3	40	3	8	11	75	—	—	—	—	—
2007–08	Lokomotiv Yaroslavl-2	RUS-3	12	1	3	4	12	—	—	—	—	—
2008–09	Lokomotiv Yaroslavl	KHL	1	0	0	0	0	—	—	—	—	—
2008–09	Lokomotiv Yaroslavl-2	RUS-3	68	5	13	18	68	4	0	0	0	6
2009–10	Bridgeport Sound Tigers	AHL	28	1	2	3	14	—	—	—	—	—
2009–10	New York Islanders	NHL	1	0	0	0	0	—	—	—	—	—
2010–11	Bridgeport Sound Tigers	AHL	51	2	7	9	28	—	—	—	—	—
2011–12	Bridgeport Sound Tigers	AHL	20	0	1	1	8	—	—	—	—	—
2011–12	Lokomotiv Yaroslavl	VHL	5	0	0	0	4	4	0	0	0	2
2012–13	HK Sarov	VHL	23	0	1	1	12	3	0	0	0	2
2013–14	Sokol Krasnoyarsk	VHL	26	0	2	2	16	—	—	—	—	—
2014–15	Naprzód Janów	PHL	31	1	19	20	63	—	—	—	—	—
2014–15	KH Sanok	PHL	9	0	3	3	4	5	0	1	1	4
2015–16	Zvezda-VDV Dmitrov	VHL	6	0	0	0	10	—	—	—	—	—
2015–16	HK Gomel	BXL	21	0	2	2	18	12	0	2	2	12
2016–17	HK Gomel	BXL	30	0	11	11	40	5	1	1	2	0
NHL totals			1	0	0	0	0	—	—	—	—	—

=== International ===
Year	Team	Event	GP	G	A	Pts	PIM
2007	Russia	IH18	4	0	0	0	4
2010	Russia	WJC	6	0	0	0	4
Junior totals			10	0	0	0	8
