= World Junior A Challenge =

International U20 ice hockey tournament

- Most recent season or competition: 2025 World Junior A Challenge
- Sport: Ice hockey
- First season: 2006
- Most recent champion: United States
- Most titles: United States (11)
- Broadcaster: TSN
- Sponsors: Hockey Canada; Canadian Junior Hockey League; International Ice Hockey Federation
- Related competitions: CJHL Prospects Game; Royal Bank Cup; World U-17 Hockey Challenge
- Website: World Junior A Challenge

The World Junior A Challenge (WJAC) is an annual under-20 international ice hockey tournament sponsored by Hockey Canada, the Canadian Junior Hockey League (CJHL), and the International Ice Hockey Federation (IIHF). The tournament showcases Junior A level players and is modeled after the IIHF World U20 Championships, which displays the best of all junior-aged hockey players. It has been hosted by Canadian cities every year in CJAHL markets.

The tournament has seen teams from Canada, the United States, Russia, Czech Republic, Switzerland, Sweden, Belarus, Denmark, Slovakia, Germany, and Latvia. Canada is represented by two regional squads; Canada West consists of players from the British Columbia, Alberta, Saskatchewan, Manitoba, and Superior International Junior Hockey Leagues, while Canada East features players from the Northern Ontario, Ontario, Central, Quebec, and Maritime Junior Hockey Leagues. American players are chosen from the United States Hockey League. Canada West captured the first two gold medals in tournament history, while the United States won the next three. Also, Russia, who has been with the tournament since the beginning, generally sends their Under-18 Team in place of a general select squad.

== History ==
Canada West's Justin Gvora with the first ever awarded WJAC Championship Trophy and Medallion (2006)

The tournament was created in 2006 through a proposal by the Canadian Junior A Hockey League (CJHL prior to 2008) to Hockey Canada. The idea behind the tournament was to showcase players from Canadian Junior "A" to Canadian Hockey League, National Collegiate Athletic Association, and National Hockey League scouts, while also exposing them to an international level and style of play.

The inaugural 2006 tournament was hosted in Yorkton, Saskatchewan, and featured six teams – Canada West, Canada East, Russia, Slovakia, Germany and Belarus. Both Canadian teams met in the final with Canada West defeating Slovakia 7-1 and Canada East defeating Russia 5–1 in their respective semifinals. Led by Kyle Turris, Canada West ran up a 4-0 tally against Canada East early in the game and held on for a 4–3 victory to win the first-ever WJAC championship.

The 2007 tournament was held in Trail, British Columbia. The United States joined the tournament for the first time, replacing Slovakia. For the second straight year, Canada West defeated the East in the final.

Beginning in 2008, the United States began a string of dominance at the tournament. They defeated Canada West in the 2008 (Camrose, Alberta) and 2009 (Summerside, Prince Edward Island) finals before winning their third consecutive title against Canada East in 2010 (Penticton, British Columbia). The 2009 tournament featured newcomers Sweden, who sent a team in place of Germany. That year also marked the first time in tournament history that Canada East failed to medal. At the 2010 WJAC, Switzerland competed in place of Belarus.

The 2013 tournament was won by the United States, 4–1, over Russia. This instance marked the first time in tournament history that both Canada East and Canada West were shut out of the gold medal game.

In 2014, the tournament started being played in December as opposed to it usually taking place in early November. The 2014 tournament marked the first time in tournament history that neither Canadian team earned a medal, with Canada East losing the bronze to Russia.

In 2025, the tournament will be hosted in Trois-Rivières, the first time in the province of Quebec.

== Champions ==
Year	(gold) Gold	(silver) Silver	(bronze) Bronze	MVP	Host city (cities)
2006	Canada West	Canada East	Russia	(Canada) West (Kyle Turris)	Yorkton, Humboldt & Canora, Saskatchewan
2007	Canada West	Canada East	United States	(Canada) West (Mike Connolly)	Trail & Nelson, British Columbia
2008	United States	Canada West	Canada East	(United States) (Mike Cichy)	Camrose, Alberta
2009	United States	Canada West	Russia	(Canada) West (Sean Bonar)	Summerside, Prince Edward Island
2010	United States	Canada East	Switzerland	(United States) (Scott Mayfield)	Penticton, British Columbia
2011	Canada West	Canada East	United States	(Canada) East (Devin Shore)	Langley, British Columbia
2012	United States	Canada West	Switzerland	(United States) (Vincent Hinostroza)	Yarmouth, Nova Scotia
2013	United States	Russia	Canada West	(United States) (Nick Schmaltz)	Yarmouth & Liverpool, Nova Scotia
2014	United States	Denmark	Russia	(Denmark) (Nikolaj Ehlers)	Kindersley, Saskatchewan
2015	Canada West	Russia	United States	(Canada) West (Tyson Jost)	Cobourg & Whitby, Ontario
2016	United States	Canada East	Russia	(Russia) (Andrei Svechnikov)	Bonnyville, Alberta
2017	Canada West	United States	Czech Republic	(Canada) West (Zach Rose)	Halifax, Nova Scotia
2018	United States	Russia	Canada West	(United States) (Bobby Brink)	Bonnyville, Alberta
2019	Russia	Canada East	United States	(Canada) East (Devon Levi)	Dawson Creek, British Columbia
2020	Tournament cancelled due to coronavirus pandemic.				Cornwall, Ontario
2021	Tournament cancelled due to coronavirus pandemic.				Cornwall, Ontario
2022	United States	Canada East	Sweden	(United States) (Cole Knuble)	Cornwall, Ontario
2023	Canada West	Canada East	United States	(Canada) East (Trevor Hoskin)	Truro, Nova Scotia
2024	United States	Sweden	Canada West		Camrose, Alberta
2025	United States	Canada West	Sweden		Trois-Rivières, Quebec

== All-time team records ==
Current as of 2023 Tournament

Team	GP	W	OTW	OTL	L	GF	GA	Medals
United States	74	53	6	4	11	348	167	9 G, 1 S, 5 B
Canada West	75	37	7	6	25	282	214	6 G, 3 S, 2 B
Russia	63	29	6	4	24	217	194	1 G, 3 S, 4 B
Canada East	75	28	4	7	36	232	280	0 G, 8 S, 1 B
Denmark	4	3	0	1	0	14	8	0 G, 1 S, 2 B
Switzerland	30	6	3	2	19	91	124	0 G, 0 S, 2 B
Czech Republic	37	10	3	3	21	88	139	0 G, 0 S, 1 B
Sweden	24	7	1	3	13	64	88	0 G, 0 S, 1 B
Belarus	17	3	1	1	12	54	108	0 G, 0 S, 0 B
Slovakia	9	2	0	1	6	22	42	0 G, 0 S, 0 B
Germany	12	2	0	0	10	34	62	0 G, 0 S, 0 B
Latvia	4	0	1	0	3	4	24	0 G, 0 S, 0 B

== Participation ==
Current as of 2025 Tournament

Country	1st place, gold medalist(s)	2nd place, silver medalist(s)	3rd place, bronze medalist(s)	Total	Appearances	First	Last
United States	11	1	5	17	17	2007	2025
Canada West; Canada East; Canada Total	6; 0; 6	4; 8; 12	3; 1; 4	13; 9; 22	18	2006	2025
Russia	1	3	4	8	14	2006	2019
Sweden	0	1	2	3	7	2009	2025
Denmark	0	1	0	1	1	2014	2014
Switzerland	0	0	2	2	7	2010	2017
Czech Republic	0	0	1	1	8	2011	2019
Slovakia	0	0	0	0	2	2006	2023
Belarus	0	0	0	0	4	2006	2009
Germany	0	0	0	0	3	2006	2008
Latvia	0	0	0	0	1	2022	2022

== See also ==
- IIHF World U18 Championship
- IIHF World U20 Championship
