= 2008 World Junior A Challenge =

Tournament details
- Host country: Canada
- Venue(s): Edgeworth Centre in Camrose, Alberta
- Dates: November 1, 2008 – November 7, 2008
- Teams: 6

Final positions
- Champions: United States (1st title)
- Runners-up: Canada West
- Third place: Canada East
- Fourth place: Belarus

Tournament statistics
- Games played: 13
- Scoring leader(s): (United States) Mike Cichy (10 pts.)

Awards
- MVP: (United States) Mike Cichy

The 2008 World Junior A Challenge was an international Junior "A" ice hockey tournament hosted by Hockey Canada. The 2008 World Junior A Challenge was hosted by the Canadian City of Camrose, Alberta from November 1 to November 9, 2008 at the Edgeworth Centre. The opening ceremony included a performance from Tom Cochrane.

== Teams ==
Same as the 2007 World Junior A Challenge, the 2008 edition will include Belarus, Canada East and West, Germany, Russia, and the United States. Slovakia, again, is not competing and has not since the 2006 World Junior A Challenge.

== Summary ==
=== Exhibition ===
Only three exhibition games were scheduled for prior to the 2008 WJAC tournament. On October 29, Canada West challenged the varsity team from Augustana University College. The West defeated Augustana 9-2. The same night, Canada East played the varsity team from Portage College. The East was victorious, taking the game 7-1. Two nights later, Canada East and Canada West met in Camrose for an exhibition rematch of the 2006 and 2007 tournament finals. The East took the game 4-2.

=== Round Robin ===
On November 2, the tournament kicked off with the opening game between Belarus and defending 2-time champion Canada West. The West went up early 2-0 only to have Belarus take one back late in the first frame. The West entered the second period with a 2-1 lead only to give up costly goals 13 seconds and 28 seconds into the frame—leading to a Belorussian 3-2 lead. Around two minutes later the Canadians came back to tie the game at 3's. There was no scoring during the rest of regulation. Overtime was uneventful, so the game went to a shootout. Belarus' Bialinski stopped all three penalty shots, while Canada's Bodnarchuk let in his first, shot by Yauheni Salamonau, and stopped his second. The result was a 4-3 upset victory for a Belorussian squad that had only won once in its last 8 WJAC games.

The early game on November 3 was between the Germans and Canada East. After giving up a goal 49 seconds into the game to Germany, the East team scored 3 goals in the first period and never looked back in a 6-3 victory. The Germans looked solid in the game despite only having won a single WJAC game in eight tried entering the game. In the late game, the Russians faced Belarus. Riding the momentum of 4 early goals in the first and second, the Russians cruised to their first win of the tournament, 10-4. The loss was on the heals of a Belorussian upset of the two-time defending champion Canada West and gives the West a chance at first with a big enough win over the Russians in their final game of the round robin.

On November 4, the Germans set the stage for the second massive upset of this World Junior A Challenge. The Americans, playing their first game of the tournaments, led 1-0 after the first and 2-0 early in the second period. That is when the bottom dropped out. Germany started scoring and just did not stop. In the end, the Germans scored 5 unanswered goals and won the game 5-2. The Germans finish the round robin with a win and a loss, awaiting the outcome of the November 5 game between the Americans and Canada East. In the late game, Canada West was triumphant over the Russian squad, overcoming an early deficit to win the game 5-2. This win gives all three teams in Pool A a 1-1 record, but because Canada West's loss was in overtime they clinch the tie-breaker and get a bye past the quarter-final.

The single November 5 game was between Canada East and the Americans. It would close out the round robin. The Americans came out on fire and defeated the East 5-3. This left each team in Pool B with a 1-1-0 record. Because of goal differential, Canada East still won first place and the United States had to settle on third place behind the Germans.

=== Quarter-final ===
In the first quarter-final, Pool A's second seed Russia took on Pool B's third seed the United States. The Americans put the boots to the Russians early, building up a 5-0 lead by the midway point of the game. Russia potted two quick goals at the end of the second period, but like the first, the third was all USA with three more insurance markers. The Americans crushed the Russians 8-2. The Americans move on to the semi-final against Canada East while the Russians are relegated to the 5th place match.

The second quarter-final was won on the heroics of Siarhei Drozd whose natural hat trick gave the Belorussians enough momentum to survive a late German onslaught and win the game. The Germans fall back to the 5th place game against the Russians, while the Belorussians will meet Canada West in the second semi-final.

=== 5th Place and Semi-final ===
The Russians found themselves in the 5th place match for the first time in their WJAC history, against the Germans who hold a win over the Americans - the team that eliminated Russia from medal contention. All this did not matter though, as the Russians dismantled the Germans with an 8-2 victory to close out the tournament on a winning note.

In the first semi-final, Canada East was up against the only team to defeat them so far in the 2008 WJAC - the Americans. This would be no day for revenge as the United States upended the Eastern squad 5-1 in front of 1525 fans. For the first time in WJAC, there will be no All-Canada final as Canada East is left competing for Bronze. The United States will compete for Gold for the first time, as last year at their first WJAC they won Bronze.

The second semi-final pitted Canada West against the only team to defeat them so far in the tournament, Belarus. The West led 1-0 after the first and Belarus tied the score 1-1 early in the second. The Canadians then battened down the hatches and scored 2 more goals to close out the period and another insurance marker in the third to win 4-1. The Belorussians move to the bronze medal game against Canada East, while Canada West goes to their third straight Gold medal game at the WJACs.

=== Bronze and Gold ===
In the bronze medal game, Canada East competed against Belarus. The Belorussians were no match for the Canada East squad who crushed Belarus 9-1. After two consecutive Silvers in WJAC-event, the Canada East squad settles for Bronze in 2008.

The Gold medal game was between two tough squads: the United States and Canada West. The Canada West team were the two-time defending Gold medalists, while the Americans were 2007 Bronze medalists who just got done manhandling Russia and Canada East to get to the Gold Medal match. In the end, it was barely a contest - led by Tournament MVP Mike Cichy, the Americans walked all over Canada West to win the Gold with a 7-1 score.

== Exhibition schedule ==
Exhibition Results
Game	Team	Score	Team	Score	Notes	Date - Time - Location
Ex1	Canada West	9	Augustana Vikings	2	Final - Shots: 50-22 CAN W	October 29, 2008 - 19:00 MST - Camrose, AB
Ex2	Canada East	7	Portage Voyageurs	1	Final - Shots: 45-15 CAN E	October 29, 2008 - 19:00 MST - Lac La Biche, AB
Ex3	Canada West	2	Canada East	4	Final - Shots: 28-27 CAN E	October 31, 2008 - 20:00 MST - Viking, AB

== 2008 Tournament ==
=== Group A ===
Pos	Team	Pld	W	OTW	OTL	L	GF	GA	GD	Pts
1	Canada West	2	1	0	1	0	8	6	+2	3
2	Russia	2	1	0	0	1	12	9	+3	2
3	Belarus	2	0	1	0	1	8	13	−5	2

=== Group B ===
Pos	Team	Pld	W	OTW	OTL	L	GF	GA	GD	Pts
1	Canada East	2	1	0	0	1	9	8	+1	2
2	Germany	2	1	0	0	1	8	8	0	2
3	United States	2	1	0	0	1	7	8	−1	2

=== Results ===
Round-robin results
Game	Pool	Team	Score	Team	Score	Notes	Date - Time - Location
1	A	Belarus	4	Canada West	3	SO Final - Shots: 35-31 BLR	November 2, 2008 - 18:00 MST - Camrose, AB
2	B	Germany	3	Canada East	6	Final - Shots: 35-19 CAN E	November 3, 2008 - 16:00 MST - Camrose, AB
3	A	Belarus	4	Russia	10	Final - Shots: 41-37 RUS	November 3, 2008 - 20:00 MST - Camrose, AB
4	B	United States	2	Germany	5	Final - Shots: 37-28 USA	November 4, 2008 - 16:00 MST - Camrose, AB
5	A	Canada West	5	Russia	2	Final - Shots: 34-23 CAN W	November 4, 2008 - 20:00 MST - Camrose, AB
6	B	Canada East	3	United States	5	Final - Shots: 44-24 USA	November 5, 2008 - 20:00 MST - Camrose, AB

=== Championship Round ===
Championship Results
Game	Round	Team	Score	Team	Score	Notes	Date - Time - Location
7	Quarter	Russia	2	United States	8	Final - Shots: 44-37 USA	November 6, 2008 - 16:00 MST - Camrose, AB
8	Quarter	Germany	5	Belarus	7	Final - Shots: 26-22 GER	November 6, 2008 - 20:00 MST - Camrose, AB
9	5th Plc.	Russia	8	Germany	2	Final - Shots: 40-27 RUS	November 8, 2008 - 12:00 MST - Camrose, AB
10	Semi	Canada East	1	United States	5	Final - Shots: 30-24 USA	November 8, 2008 - 16:00 MST - Camrose, AB
11	Semi	Canada West	4	Belarus	1	Final - Shots: 43-22 CAN W	November 8, 2008 - 20:00 MST - Camrose, AB
12	Bronze	Canada East	9	Belarus	1	Final - Shots: 36-30 CAN E	November 9, 2008 - 13:00 MST - Camrose, AB
13	Gold	United States	7	Canada West	1	Final - Shots: 39-19 USA	November 9, 2008 - 18:00 MST - Camrose, AB

=== Final standings ===
	Team
1st place, gold medalist(s)	United States
2nd place, silver medalist(s)	Canada West
3rd place, bronze medalist(s)	Canada East
4th	Belarus
5th	Russia
6th	Germany

== Statistics ==
=== Scorers ===
Scoring Leaders
Player	Team	GP	G	A	P	PIM
(United States) Mike Cichy	United States	5	5	5	10	2
(Belarus) Siarhei Drozd	Belarus	5	7	2	9	0
(Russia) Vladimir Tarasenko	Russia	4	2	7	9	10
(United States) Craig Smith	United States	5	3	5	8	2
(Russia) Sergey Chvanov	Russia	4	5	2	7	4
(Canada) Brandon Pirri	Canada East	4	4	3	7	0
(United States) David Gerths	United States	5	4	3	7	12
(Belarus) Ihar Varashylau	Belarus	5	3	4	7	4
(Russia) Kirill Kabanov	Russia	4	3	4	7	12
(United States) Danny Kristo	United States	5	3	4	7	0

=== Goaltenders ===
Leading goaltenders
Player	Team	GP	Mins	GA	SO	GAA	Sv%	Record
(United States) Mike Lee	United States	4	240	7	0	1.75	0.933	4–0–0
(Canada) Shawn Sirman	Canada East	2	90	5	0	3.33	0.907	1–1–0
(Canada) Kevin Genoe	Canada West	3	156	6	0	2.31	0.906	2–1–0
(Russia) Eduard Reyzvikh	Russia	3	147	11	0	4.49	0.878	0–1–0
(Russia) Dmitry Shikin	Russia	3	93	8	0	5.16	0.877	2–1–0

== Awards ==
Most Valuable Player: Mike Cichy (USA)

All-Star Team

Forwards: Mike Cichy (USA), Jaden Schwartz (CAN W), Craig Smith (USA)
Defence: Matt Donovan (USA), Andrew MacWilliam (CAN W)
Goalie: Mike Lee (USA)

== Rosters ==
=== Belarus ===
(Belarus) Players: Vitali Bialinski, Valeri Bojarskih, Kiryl Brykun, Pavel Dashkou, Siarhei Drozd, Nikolai Goncharov, Aleh Haroshka, Ilya Kaznadzei, Andrei Kolasau, Dzmitry Korabau, Aliaksei Kuveka, Vitali Marchanka, Uladzimir Mikhailau, Anatol Panou, Pavel Razvadouski, Yauheni Salamonau, Illa Shinkevitch, Yahor Stsiapanau, Mikalai Susla, Ihar Varashylau, Dzmitry Verameichyk, Dzmitry Volkau, Aliaksandr Yeronau, Aliaksandr Zhuk

Staff: Vaily Spiridonov, Pavel Perapekhin, Vasilij Pankov, Vyatcheslav Gusov, Ihar Karachun, Heorhi Zatkouski, Dzmitry Klaskouski, Sergei Opimakh

=== Canada East ===
(Canada) Players: Braden Birch, Nick D'Agostino, Dustin Darou, Scott Dawson, Jordan Escott, Jeremy Franklin, Andrew Hare, Zach Hervato, Stephen Horyl, Pierre-Luc Lacombe, Jacob Laliberté, Greg Miller, Marty O'Grady, David Pacan, Brandon Pirri, David Pratt, Jeremy Price, Ben Sexton, Shawn Sirman, Reilly Smith, Lindsay Sparks, Mike Wills

Staff: Mark Grady, Patrice Bosch, Troy Ryan, Marty Abrams, Brent Ladds, Bob Baird, Darren Allan

=== Canada West ===
(Canada) Players: Andrew Bodnarchuk, Tommy Brown, Aaron Dell, Tanner Fritz, Kevin Genoe, Derek Grant, Matt Grassi, Tim Hayduk, James Kerr, Scott Macaulay, Michael MacDonald, Matt Mackay, Andrew MacWilliam, Denver Manderson, Curtis McKenzie, Dylan Olsen, Brodie Reid, Derek Rodwell, Justin Schultz, Jaden Schwartz, Rylan Schwartz, Steven Seigo, Travis Statchuk, Cole Wilson, Michael Young

Staff: Boris Rybalka, Dwight McMillan, Rylan Ferster, Ken Miske, Brent Sawchuk, Norm Zunti, Leonard Strandberg, Kim Davis

=== Germany ===
(Germany) Players: Sinan Akdag, Dominik Bielke, Benedikt Bruckner, Maximilian Englbrecht, Jerome Flaake, Andreas Gawlik, Patrick Geiger, Martin Hinterstocker, André Huebscher, Markus Keller, Conor Morrisson, Florian Muller, Marco Nowak, Alexander Oblinger, Daniel Oppolzer, Patrick Pohl, Steven Rupprich, Toni Ritter, Gregor Stein, Soren Sturm, Dominic Walsh, Daniel Weiss, Marc Wittforth, David Wolf

Staff: Ernst Hofner, Jeffrey Tomlinson, Wolfgang Fischer, Jorg Lochbihler, Michael Pfuhl

=== Russia ===
(Russia) Players: Sergey Barbashev, Roman Berdnikov, Georgy Berdyukov, Igor Bobkov, Stanislav Bocharov, Anton Burdasov, Alexander Burmistrov, Sergey Chvanov, Georgy Dulnev, Kirill Kabanov, Stanislav Kalashnikov, Dmitry Kanifadin, Alexander Karpushkin, Anton Kavera, Maxim Kitsin, Yevgeni Kuznetsov, Kirill Lebedev, Vladimir Malinovsky, Dmitry Orlov, Nikita Pivtsakin, Eduard Reyzvikh, Dmitry Shikin, Stanislav Solovyev, Vladimir Tarasenko, Semen Valuyskiy, Kirll Yuryev, Pavel Zotov, Vitaly Zotov

Staff: Vladimir Plyuschev, Sergey Petrenko, Igor Ostapchuk, Dmitry Kondrashin, Oleg Kuchenev, Alexey Sasin, Alexander Shapiro

=== United States ===
(United States) Players: Josh Balch, Josh Birkholz, Greg Burke, Rocco Carzo, Mike Cichy, Matt Donovan, David Gerths, Seth Helgeson, Joe Howe, Danny Kristo, Nick Larson, Mike Lee, Dave Makowski, Lee Moffie, John Moore, Pat Mullane, Maxim Nicastro, Nick Oddo, Darren Rowe, Craig Smith, Matt White

Staff: Mark Carlson, Bliss Littler, Todd Knott, Darrin Flinchem, Todd Klein, David Peck, Marc Boxer
