= Braden Birch =

Canadian ice hockey defenceman

- Born: September 25, 1989 (age 36) Hamilton, Ontario, Canada
- Height: 6 ft 4 in (193 cm)
- Weight: 220 lb (100 kg; 15 st 10 lb)
- Position: Defence
- Shot: Left
- Played for: HIFK
- NHL draft: 179th overall, 2008; Chicago Blackhawks
- Playing career: 2013–2014

Braden Birch
Medal record

Ice hockey

Representing Canada East

World Junior A Challenge
Bronze medal – third place	2008 Camrose	

Braden Birch (born September 25, 1989) is a Canadian former ice hockey defenceman who last played in the East Coast Hockey League. Birch was selected by the Chicago Blackhawks in the 6th round (179th overall) of the 2008 NHL entry draft.

Birch made his Liiga debut playing with HIFK during the 2013–14 Liiga season.

Birch is currently the assistant general manager of the New Jersey Devils and general manager of their AHL affiliate, the Utica Comets, roles he assumed in May 2026. Previously, he served as the director of hockey operations and salary cap management for the Florida Panthers, where he won consecutive Stanley Cup championships as an executive in 2024 and 2025.
