= Matt Donovan (ice hockey) =

American ice hockey player

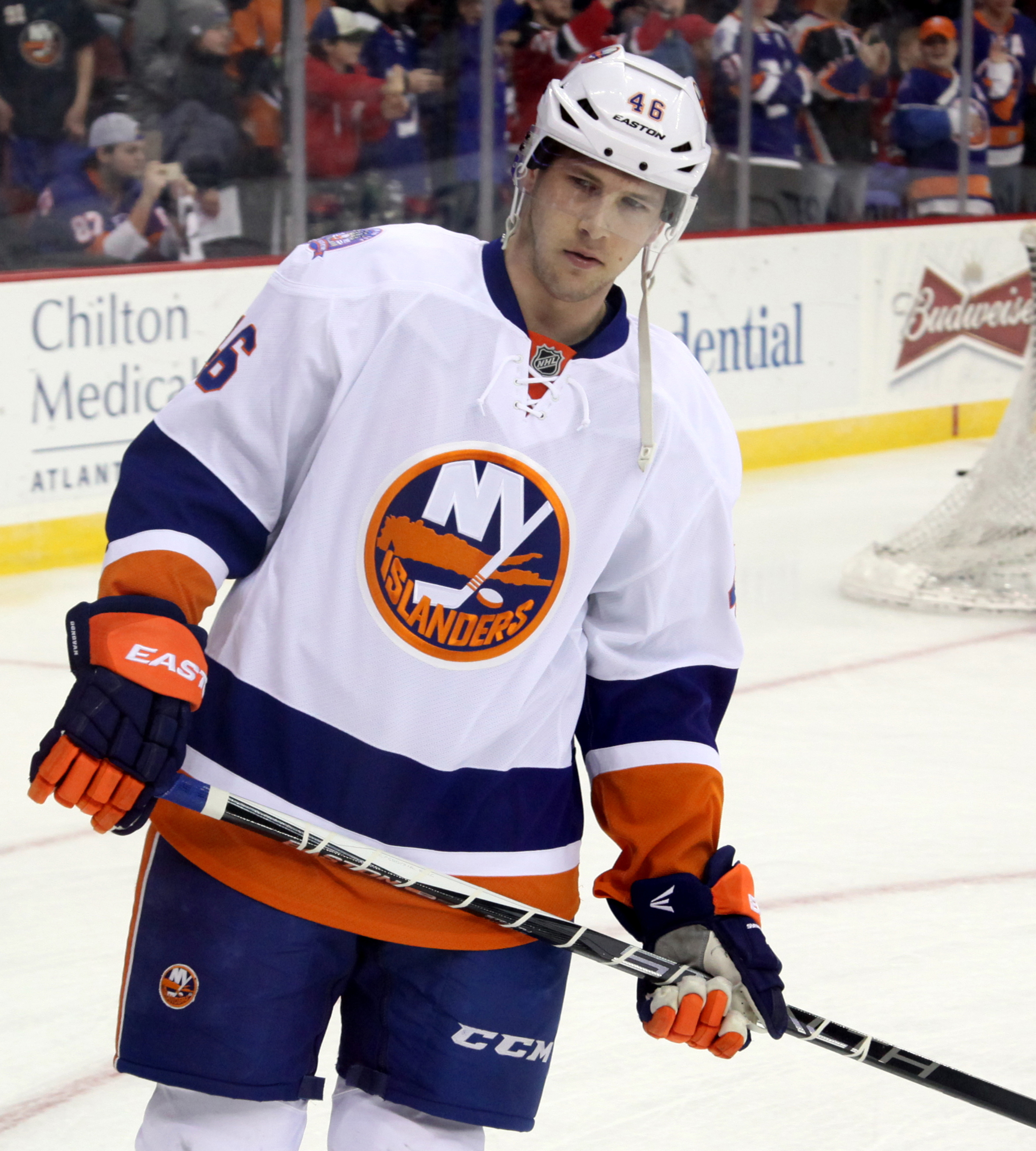
- Donovan with the New York Islanders in 2015
- Born: May 9, 1990 (age 36) Edmond, Oklahoma, U.S.
- Height: 6 ft 0 in (183 cm)
- Weight: 190 lb (86 kg; 13 st 8 lb)
- Position: Defense
- Shot: Left
- Played for: New York Islanders; Frölunda HC; Nashville Predators; HV71; Adler Mannheim
- National team: United States
- NHL draft: 96th overall, 2008; New York Islanders
- Playing career: 2011–2024

Matt Donovan (born May 9, 1990) is an American former professional ice hockey defenseman who played in the National Hockey League (NHL). Donovan was selected by the New York Islanders in the fourth round (96th overall) of the 2008 NHL entry draft.

== Playing career ==
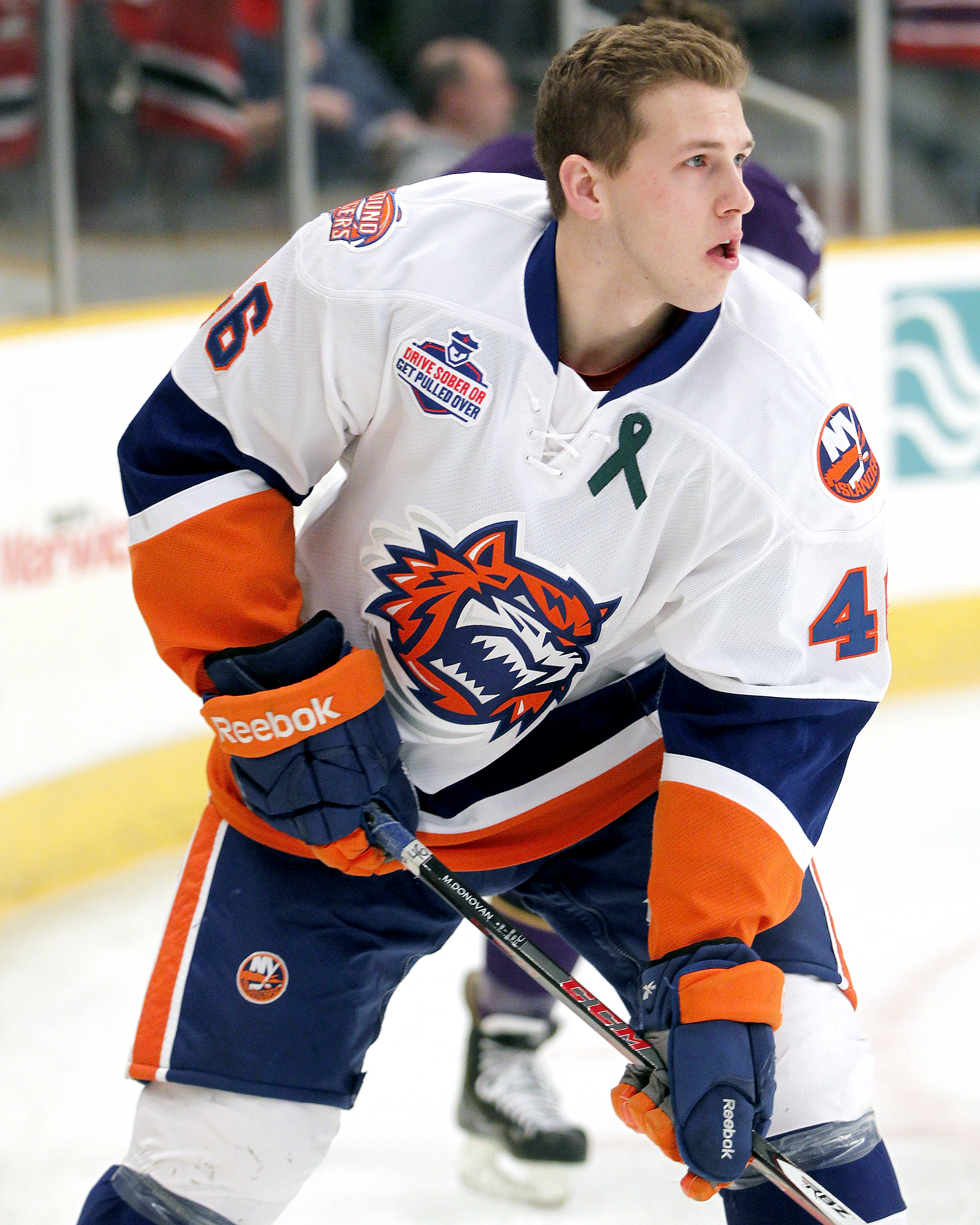
Donovan at the 2013 AHL All-Star Skills Competition

Donovan grew up playing in Oklahoma City's youth hockey program where he initially attended Edmond North High School until the age of 15 before moving to John F. Kennedy High School in Cedar Rapids, Iowa. While in Iowa, Donovan played for the Cedar Rapids RoughRiders of the United States Hockey League (USHL). As a RoughRider, he was named to the USHL All-Rookie Team in his first season (2007–08), and the league's First All-Star Team in the following season.

Donovan made his University of Denver debut on October 9, 2009, and completed his first season as a Pioneer with seven goals and 14 assists for a total of 21 points in 36 games to lead all Western Collegiate Hockey Association (WCHA) defenseman in goals. For his efforts he was rewarded by being named to the Inside College Hockey Freshman All-American team, All-College Hockey News Rookie Team, and All-WCHA Rookie Team.

Donovan was drafted 96th overall in the fourth round of the National Hockey League's (NHL) 2008 draft by the New York Islanders. Upon completing his sophomore season at the University of Denver, he was quickly signed to a professional contract by the Islanders, who assigned him to play for their American Hockey League (AHL) affiliate, the Bridgeport Sound Tigers. Donovan scored a goal and four assists during the final six games of 2010–11 AHL season. For the 2012–13 season, Donovan tied Justin Schultz for the most points among AHL defensemen with 48.

Donovan made his NHL debut on April 3, 2012, against the New Jersey Devils, making him the first Oklahoman born, raised, and trained in the state to play in the NHL. Donovan wore uniform number 46 in honor of Oklahoma being the 46th state. After making the Islanders' roster to start the 2013–14 season, he scored his first NHL goal on October 8, 2013, against Mike Smith of the Phoenix Coyotes.

With the Islanders declining to give Donovan a qualifying offer, on July 1, 2015, the Buffalo Sabres signed Donovan as a free agent to a one-year contract.

After spending the 2015–16 season exclusively within the Sabres' AHL affiliate, the Rochester Americans, Donovan left the NHL as a free agent to sign a one-year contract abroad with Swedish club, Frölunda HC of the Swedish Hockey League (SHL), on July 21, 2016.

Donovan enjoyed two productive seasons in Sweden, before opting to return to North America for the 2018–19 season, securing a one-year AHL contract with the Milwaukee Admirals on June 7, 2018. Donovan instantly made an impact with the Admirals, leading the club in scoring with 12 points through his first 13 games before he was signed by NHL affiliate, the Nashville Predators, on a two-year, two-way contract on November 4, 2018.

Nearing the conclusion of his contract with the Predators, Donovan opted to continue his tenure with the Milwaukee Admirals by signing a two-year AHL contract extension on March 23, 2020.

With the Admirals opting out of playing in the pandemic delayed 2020–21 season, Donovan made a return to Sweden and the SHL, belatedly signing for the remainder of the season with HV71 on January 20, 2021. He posted 2 goals and 7 points in 12 regular season games, unable to help prevent HV71 suffering relegation to the HockeyAllsvenskan (Allsv).

Returning to the Admirals for the following 2021–22 season, Donovan as an alternate captain, contributed with 8 goals and 40 points from the blueline in all 76 regular season games.

On June 17, 2022, Donovan again left the AHL and signed a one-year contract with German club, Adler Mannheim of the Deutsche Eishockey Liga (DEL). In the 2022–23 season, Donovan as an alternate captain contributed offensively on the blueline with 8 goals and 23 points through 47 regular season games. He also added 8 assists in 12 playoff contests.

As a free agent, Donovan returned to North America after securing a one-year AHL contract with the Chicago Wolves on June 14, 2023. In the 2023–24 season, Donovan continued to produce offensively from the blueline, totalling 43 points through 69 regular season games.

On August 26, 2024, Donovan concluded his 14-year professional career, after he was unveiled as an assistant coach of the Milwaukee Admirals of the AHL, affiliate to former club, the Nashville Predators.

== International play ==
Medal record

Ice hockey

Representing United States

World Junior Championships
Gold medal – first place	2010 Canada	

World Junior A Challenge
Gold medal – first place	2008 Camrose	

Donovan was a member of the United States junior hockey team that captured the gold medal in January 2010 at the 2010 World Junior Ice Hockey Championships with a 6–5 overtime victory against Team Canada. Throughout the seven games Donovan gained three goals and two assists with a plus-6 rating.

== Career statistics ==
=== Regular season and playoffs ===
			Regular season					Playoffs
Season	Team	League	GP	G	A	Pts	PIM	GP	G	A	Pts	PIM
2007–08	Cedar Rapids RoughRiders	USHL	59	12	18	30	41	3	0	1	1	4
2008–09	Cedar Rapids RoughRiders	USHL	57	19	32	51	43	5	0	4	4	2
2009–10	University of Denver	WCHA	36	7	14	21	50	—	—	—	—	—
2010–11	University of Denver	WCHA	42	9	23	32	64	—	—	—	—	—
2010–11	Bridgeport Sound Tigers	AHL	6	1	4	5	10	—	—	—	—	—
2011–12	Bridgeport Sound Tigers	AHL	72	10	34	44	63	3	0	1	1	6
2011–12	New York Islanders	NHL	3	0	0	0	0	—	—	—	—	—
2012–13	Bridgeport Sound Tigers	AHL	75	14	34	48	112	—	—	—	—	—
2013–14	New York Islanders	NHL	52	2	14	16	26	—	—	—	—	—
2013–14	Bridgeport Sound Tigers	AHL	27	7	14	21	25	—	—	—	—	—
2014–15	New York Islanders	NHL	12	0	3	3	0	2	0	0	0	10
2015–16	Rochester Americans	AHL	73	8	23	31	61	—	—	—	—	—
2016–17	Frölunda HC	SHL	50	1	14	15	74	14	0	1	1	8
2017–18	Frölunda HC	SHL	52	7	20	27	69	6	0	0	0	0
2018–19	Milwaukee Admirals	AHL	64	11	24	35	66	5	0	2	2	8
2018–19	Nashville Predators	NHL	2	0	1	1	2	—	—	—	—	—
2019–20	Milwaukee Admirals	AHL	62	5	27	32	58	—	—	—	—	—
2020–21	HV71	SHL	12	2	5	7	2	—	—	—	—	—
2021–22	Milwaukee Admirals	AHL	76	8	32	40	57	9	1	2	3	6
2022–23	Adler Mannheim	DEL	47	8	15	23	33	12	0	8	8	8
2023–24	Chicago Wolves	AHL	69	4	39	43	88	—	—	—	—	—
NHL totals			69	2	18	20	28	2	0	0	0	10

=== International ===
Year	Team	Event	Result	GP	G	A	Pts	PIM
2010	United States	WJC	1st place, gold medalist(s)	7	3	2	5	4
2014	United States	WC	6th	7	2	0	2	2
Junior totals				7	3	2	5	4
Senior totals				7	2	0	2	2

== Awards and honors ==
Award	Year
USHL
All-Rookie Team	2008
First All-Star Team	2009
College
WCHA All-Rookie Team	2010
WCHA Second All-Star Team	2011
WCHA All-Tournament Team	2011
AHL
All-Rookie Team	2012
All-Star Game	2013
CHL
Champion	2017
