= Dylan Olsen =

American-Canadian ice hockey player

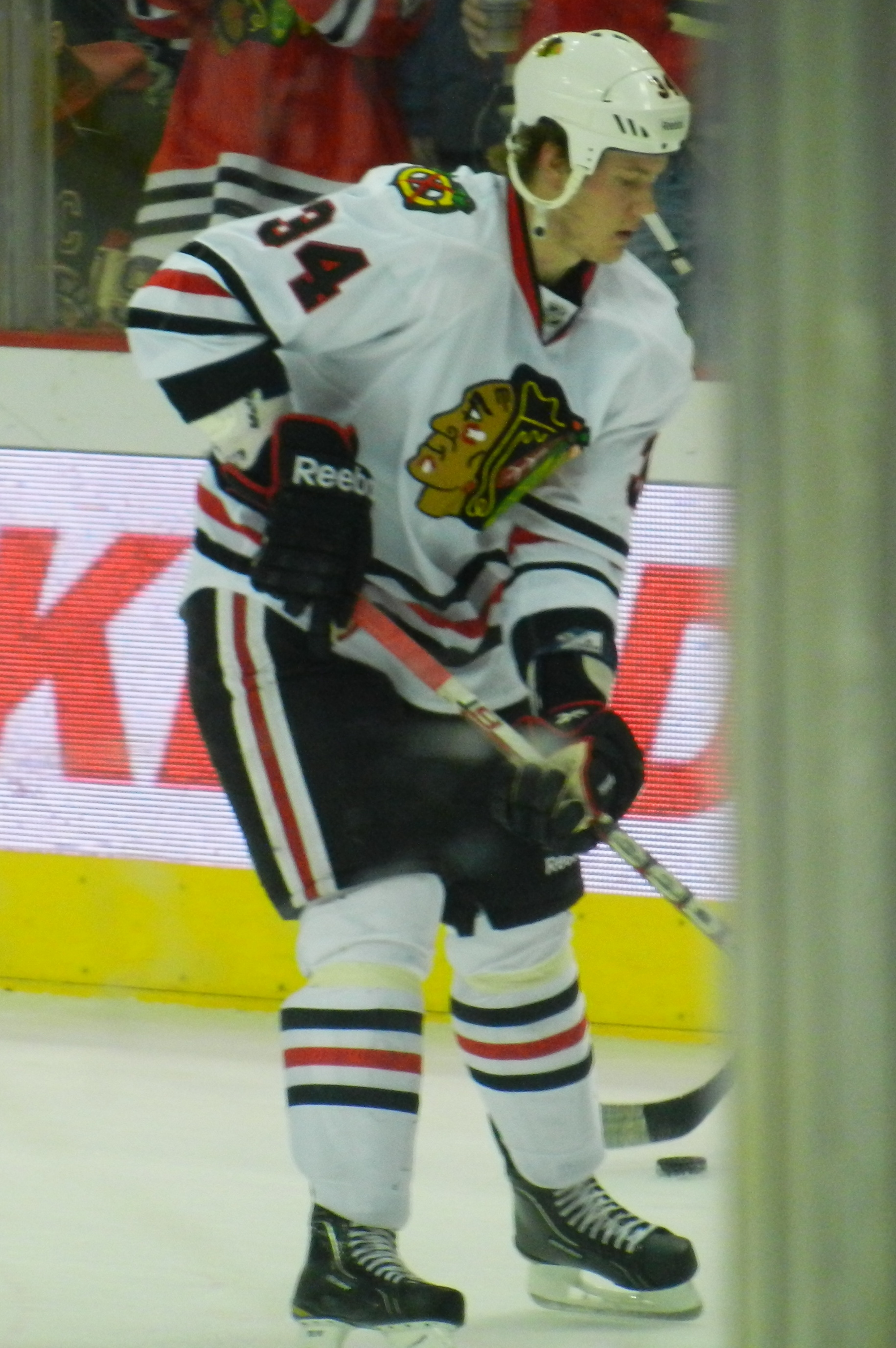
- Olsen with the Chicago Blackhawks in 2012
- Born: January 3, 1991 (age 35) Salt Lake City, Utah, U.S.
- Height: 6 ft 2 in (188 cm)
- Weight: 223 lb (101 kg; 15 st 13 lb)
- Position: Defense
- Shot: Left
- Played for: Chicago Blackhawks; Florida Panthers; Nottingham Panthers; HK Nitra
- NHL draft: 28th overall, 2009; Chicago Blackhawks
- Playing career: 2010–2022

Dylan D. Olsen (born January 3, 1991) is an American and Canadian former professional ice hockey player, who most recently played with the Wichita Thunder of the ECHL. Olsen played for the Florida Panthers of the National Hockey League (NHL). Olsen was drafted 28th overall by the Chicago Blackhawks during the 2009 NHL entry draft. He played his junior hockey with the Camrose Kodiaks of the Alberta Junior Hockey League (AJHL), and played college ice hockey at the University of Minnesota Duluth of the NCAA.

== Playing career ==
=== Amateur ===
Olsen, who was drafted by the Medicine Hat Tigers of the Western Hockey League (WHL) in the fourth round, 84th overall in the 2006 WHL Bantam Draft, elected to play with the Camrose Kodiaks of the AJHL to keep his NCAA eligibility. Olsen appeared in two games with the Kodiaks in 2006–07, scoring a goal.

In his rookie season of 2007–08, Olsen appeared in 49 games, scoring eight goals and 24 points, as he helped the Kodiaks to have the best record in the league. In the playoffs, Olsen had six points in 16 games, as Camrose won the 2008 AJHL championship. The club then won the 2008 Doyle Cup as Western Canadian champions, defeating the Penticton Vees, before falling to the Humboldt Broncos in the final game of the 2008 Royal Bank Cup.

In 2008–09, Olsen improved his numbers, scoring 10 goals and 29 points in 53 games, and in ten playoff games, he earned seven points before the Kodiaks were eliminated in the AJHL playoffs.

Olsen spent the 2009–10 season with the University of Minnesota Duluth Bulldogs, where in 36 games, Olsen had a goal and 11 points, along with 49 penalty minutes.

=== Professional ===
Olsen signed a three-year entry-level contract with the Chicago Blackhawks on December 31, 2010, while playing for Team Canada at the 2011 World Junior Ice Hockey Championships. After the conclusion of the tournament Olsen reported to Rockford, the Blackhawks top minor league affiliate.

Olsen participated in his first playoff game on Tuesday, April 17, 2012, in Game Three of the Western Conference Quarterfinals.

During the 2013–14 season, on November 14, 2013, Olsen was traded by the Blackhawks to the Florida Panthers along with Jimmy Hayes in exchange for Kris Versteeg and Philippe Lefebvre. Olsen scored his first NHL goal as a member of the Panthers on December 5, 2013 against Ondrej Pavelec of the Winnipeg Jets.

Following the 2015–16 season, Olsen was released as a free agent by the Panthers, and went un-signed throughout the following 2016–17 season. After playing locally with the Nanton Palominos of the Ranchland Hockey League, Olsen accepted a try-out in the following summer to attend the Calgary Flames training camp on September 13, 2017. At the conclusion of camp in Calgary, Olsen was assigned to tryout with AHL affiliate, the Stockton Heat, on September 19, 2017. On October 13, Olsen signed a one-year deal with the ECHL's Adirondack Thunder.

After playing 8 seasons in North America, Olsen opted to sign abroad in agreeing to a one-year deal with English club the Nottingham Panthers of the Elite Ice Hockey League (EIHL) on May 31, 2018.

Olsen played parts of two seasons abroad with the Panthers and Slovak club HK Nitra of the Slovak Extraliga, before returning to North America during the 2019–20 season, continuing his professional career in the ECHL with the South Carolina Stingrays on January 10, 2020.

== Personal life ==
Olsen's father, Darryl Olsen, played in one game with the Calgary Flames during the 1991–92 NHL season, and spent some of his years in the minor leagues in Salt Lake City, Utah, where Dylan was born.

== Career statistics ==
=== Regular season and playoffs ===
			Regular season					Playoffs
Season	Team	League	GP	G	A	Pts	PIM	GP	G	A	Pts	PIM
2006–07	Camrose Kodiaks	AJHL	2	1	0	1	0	—	—	—	—	—
2007–08	Camrose Kodiaks	AJHL	49	8	16	24	45	16	1	5	6	6
2008–09	Camrose Kodiaks	AJHL	53	10	19	29	123	10	1	6	7	12
2009–10	University of Minnesota Duluth	WCHA	36	1	10	11	49	—	—	—	—	—
2010–11	University of Minnesota Duluth	WCHA	17	1	12	13	8	—	—	—	—	—
2010–11	Rockford IceHogs	AHL	42	0	4	4	10	—	—	—	—	—
2011–12	Rockford IceHogs	AHL	44	4	3	7	44	—	—	—	—	—
2011–12	Chicago Blackhawks	NHL	28	0	1	1	6	1	0	0	0	0
2012–13	Rockford IceHogs	AHL	50	2	9	11	27	—	—	—	—	—
2013–14	Rockford IceHogs	AHL	16	0	8	8	8	—	—	—	—	—
2013–14	San Antonio Rampage	AHL	4	1	1	2	2	—	—	—	—	—
2013–14	Florida Panthers	NHL	44	3	9	12	8	—	—	—	—	—
2014–15	Florida Panthers	NHL	44	2	6	8	20	—	—	—	—	—
2014–15	San Antonio Rampage	AHL	12	1	2	3	22	2	1	0	1	2
2015–16	Florida Panthers	NHL	8	0	1	1	2	—	—	—	—	—
2015–16	Portland Pirates	AHL	47	5	11	16	12	4	0	0	0	2
2016–17	Nanton Palominos	RHL	6	1	4	5	0	—	—	—	—	—
2017–18	Adirondack Thunder	ECHL	50	5	18	23	14	17	1	6	7	0
2017–18	Binghamton Devils	AHL	7	0	1	1	8	—	—	—	—	—
2018–19	Nottingham Panthers	EIHL	46	8	11	19	49	3	0	0	0	0
2019–20	HK Nitra	Slovak	21	0	2	2	22	—	—	—	—	—
2019–20	South Carolina Stingrays	ECHL	9	0	1	1	0	—	—	—	—	—
2019–20	Wichita Thunder	ECHL	4	0	3	3	0	—	—	—	—	—
2021–22	Wichita Thunder	ECHL	2	0	0	0	0	—	—	—	—	—
NHL totals			124	5	17	22	36	1	0	0	0	0

Medal record

Representing Canada

Ice hockey

World Junior Championships
Silver medal – second place	2011 USA	

Representing Canada West

World Junior A Challenge
Silver medal – second place	2008 Camrose	

=== International ===
Year	Team	Event	Result	GP	G	A	Pts	PIM
2008	Canada Pacific	U17	4th	6	0	3	3	6
2009	Canada	WJC18	4th	6	2	2	4	14
2011	Canada	WJC	2nd place, silver medalist(s)	7	0	2	2	0
Junior totals				19	2	7	9	20

== Awards and honors ==
- Invited to take part in Canada's 2011 National Junior Team selection camp

Awards and achievements
Preceded by Kyle Beach	Chicago Blackhawks first-round draft pick 2009	Succeeded by Kevin Hayes
