= Andrew Bodnarchuk =

Canadian ice hockey player (born 1988)

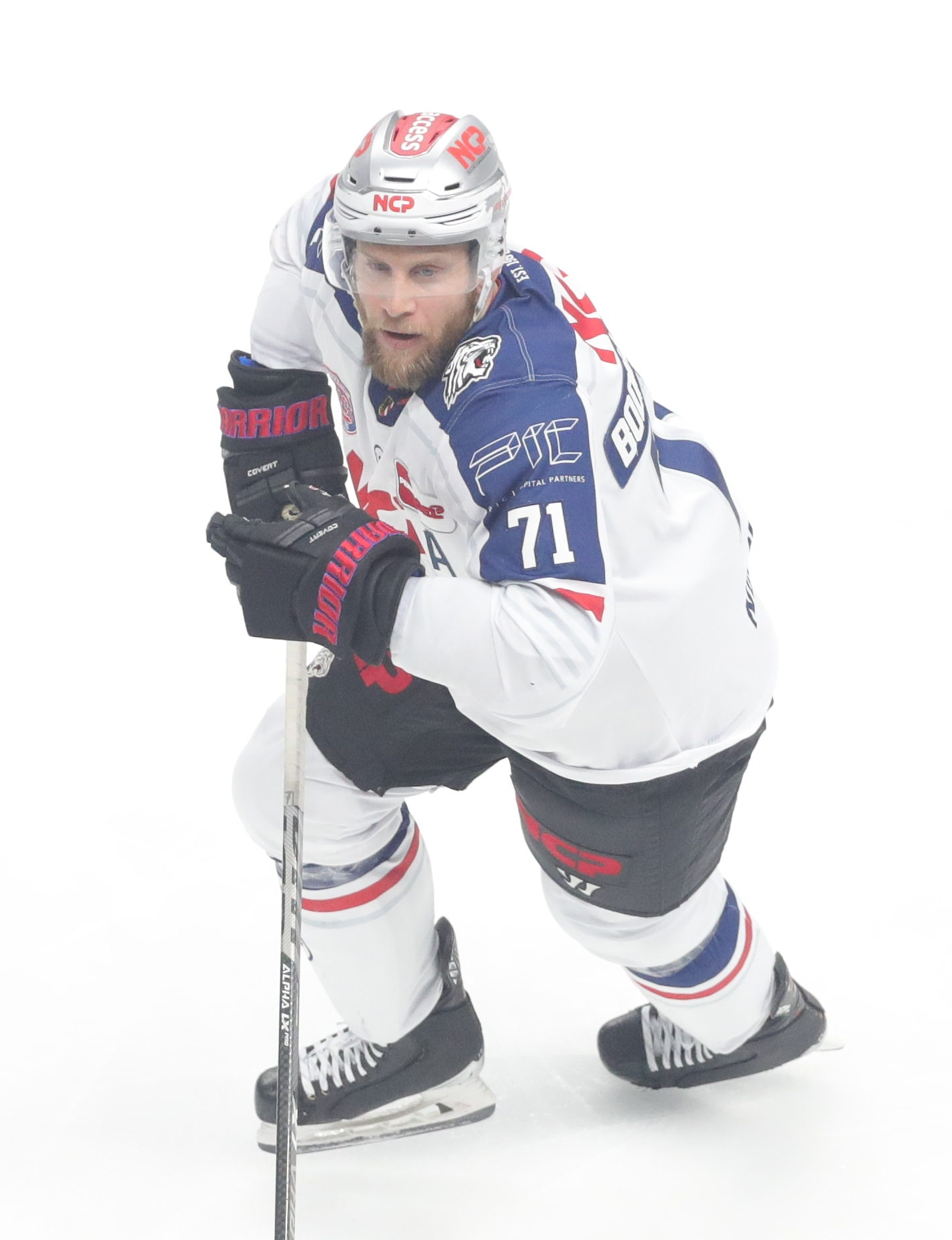
- Bodnarchuk with Nürnberg in 2022
- Born: July 11, 1988 (age 38) Drumheller, Alberta, Canada
- Height: 5 ft 11 in (180 cm)
- Weight: 190 lb (86 kg; 13 st 8 lb)
- Position: Defence
- Shoots: Left
- DEL2 team Former teams: Düsseldorfer EG; Boston Bruins; Columbus Blue Jackets; Colorado Avalanche; EHC München; Nürnberg Ice Tigers
- NHL draft: 128th overall, 2006; Boston Bruins
- Playing career: 2007–present

Andrew Scott Bodnarchuk (born July 11, 1988) is a Canadian professional ice hockey defenceman who is currently playing for Düsseldorfer EG of the DEL2. Bodnarchuk was born in Drumheller, Alberta.

== Playing career ==
Bodnarchuk played junior hockey in the Quebec Major Junior Hockey League (QMJHL) with the Halifax Mooseheads. He was drafted by the Bruins in the fifth round of the 2006 NHL entry draft. After spending most of the 2009–10 season with the Providence Bruins of the American Hockey League (AHL), Bodnarchuk made his NHL debut on April 3, 2010, in a 2–1 overtime victory against the Toronto Maple Leafs.

On July 6, 2012, Bodnarchuk signed as a free agent to a one-year contract with the Los Angeles Kings. He was assigned to the Kings' AHL affiliate, the Manchester Monarchs, with which he later won the Calder Cup with in the 2014–15 season.

On July 2, 2015, Bodnarchuk left the Kings organization as a free agent and signed a one-year, two-way contract with the Columbus Blue Jackets. Following a promising training camp in Columbus, he was assigned to begin the 2015–16 season with Columbus' AHL affiliate, the Lake Erie Monsters. In 14 games, Bodnarchuk was leading the Monsters defence on the top pairing, contributing with 8 points, before he was recalled to the Blue Jackets on November 21, 2015. He made his debut with Columbus, playing his first NHL game since 2010, in a 5–3 defeat against the San Jose Sharks the following day. In his 11th career game, Bodnarchuk recorded his first NHL point in a 2–1 shootout loss to the Florida Panthers on December 4, 2015.

Bodnarchuk played in 16 games with the Blue Jackets before he was placed on waivers in order to return to the Monsters. On January 5, 2016, Bodnarchuck was claimed off of waivers by the Colorado Avalanche. He made his debut with the Avalanche playing alongside defensive partner François Beauchemin in a 4–3 victory over the St. Louis Blues on January 6, 2016.

At the conclusion of his contract, Bodnarchuk left the Avalanche as a free agent to sign a two-year, two-way contract with the Dallas Stars on July 1, 2016. Added to the Stars organization to provide a depth option on the blueline, Bodnarchuk was assigned to Dallas' AHL affiliate, the Texas Stars, for the duration of his contract. In the 2017–18 season, he helped Texas reach the Calder Cup finals before losing a Game 7 decider to the Toronto Marlies.

As an impending free agent, Bodnarchuk opted to sign his first contract abroad, agreeing to a two-year deal with reigning three-time defending German champions EHC München of the Deutsche Eishockey Liga (DEL) on June 18, 2018.

On August 23, 2020, Bodnarchuk continued his tenure in the DEL, signing a one-year contract with the Nürnberg Ice Tigers.

In his third season with the Ice Tigers in 2022–23, Bodnarchuk collected 6 goals and 12 points through 50 regular season games from the blueline. Following a playoff qualifier defeat to the Fischtown Pinguins, he left Nürnberg at the conclusion of his contract on March 18, 2023.

After three seasons with EC Kassel Huskies in the DEL2, Bodnarchuk continued his tenure in the second tier in joining newly relegated Düsseldorfer EG on a one-year contract on May 6, 2026.

== Career statistics ==
=== Regular season and playoffs ===
| | | | Regular season | | | | | Playoffs |
| Season | Team | League | GP | G | A | Pts | PIM | GP | G | A | Pts | PIM |
|---|---|---|---|---|---|---|---|---|---|---|---|---|
| 2004–05 | St. Paul's School | USHS | 36 | 3 | 15 | 18 | | — | — | — | — | — |
| 2005–06 | Halifax Mooseheads | QMJHL | 68 | 6 | 17 | 23 | 136 | 11 | 0 | 2 | 2 | 22 |
| 2006–07 | Halifax Mooseheads | QMJHL | 63 | 16 | 41 | 57 | 96 | 12 | 1 | 10 | 11 | 25 |
| 2006–07 | Providence Bruins | AHL | — | — | — | — | — | 1 | 0 | 0 | 0 | 0 |
| 2007–08 | Halifax Mooseheads | QMJHL | 65 | 10 | 33 | 43 | 89 | 14 | 0 | 9 | 9 | 16 |
| 2008–09 | Providence Bruins | AHL | 62 | 1 | 9 | 10 | 33 | 15 | 0 | 2 | 2 | 22 |
| 2009–10 | Providence Bruins | AHL | 70 | 5 | 10 | 15 | 51 | — | — | — | — | — |
| 2009–10 | Boston Bruins | NHL | 5 | 0 | 0 | 0 | 2 | — | — | — | — | — |
| 2010–11 | Providence Bruins | AHL | 75 | 1 | 15 | 16 | 91 | — | — | — | — | — |
| 2011–12 | Providence Bruins | AHL | 63 | 5 | 12 | 17 | 44 | — | — | — | — | — |
| 2012–13 | Manchester Monarchs | AHL | 69 | 5 | 15 | 20 | 77 | 4 | 0 | 0 | 0 | 0 |
| 2013–14 | Manchester Monarchs | AHL | 73 | 8 | 24 | 32 | 89 | 4 | 0 | 0 | 0 | 0 |
| 2014–15 | Manchester Monarchs | AHL | 61 | 5 | 20 | 25 | 84 | 19 | 0 | 6 | 6 | 14 |
| 2015–16 | Lake Erie Monsters | AHL | 14 | 2 | 6 | 8 | 10 | — | — | — | — | — |
| 2015–16 | Columbus Blue Jackets | NHL | 16 | 0 | 2 | 2 | 8 | — | — | — | — | — |
| 2015–16 | Colorado Avalanche | NHL | 21 | 0 | 2 | 2 | 6 | — | — | — | — | — |
| 2016–17 | Texas Stars | AHL | 69 | 5 | 21 | 26 | 69 | — | — | — | — | — |
| 2017–18 | Texas Stars | AHL | 73 | 3 | 18 | 21 | 68 | 22 | 1 | 0 | 1 | 23 |
| 2018–19 | EHC Red Bull München | DEL | 50 | 2 | 11 | 13 | 52 | 18 | 0 | 1 | 1 | 12 |
| 2019–20 | EHC Red Bull München | DEL | 51 | 1 | 5 | 6 | 95 | — | — | — | — | — |
| 2020–21 | Nürnberg Ice Tigers | DEL | 28 | 2 | 3 | 5 | 32 | — | — | — | — | — |
| 2021–22 | Nürnberg Ice Tigers | DEL | 42 | 2 | 11 | 13 | 93 | 1 | 0 | 0 | 0 | 0 |
| 2022–23 | Nürnberg Ice Tigers | DEL | 50 | 6 | 6 | 12 | 38 | 2 | 0 | 0 | 0 | 0 |
| 2023–24 | Kassel Huskies | DEL2 | 50 | 3 | 14 | 17 | 44 | 18 | 1 | 1 | 2 | 4 |
| 2024–25 | Kassel Huskies | DEL2 | 33 | 1 | 11 | 12 | 73 | 10 | 1 | 2 | 3 | 12 |
| 2025–26 | Kassel Huskies | DEL2 | 49 | 4 | 11 | 15 | 18 | 6 | 0 | 0 | 0 | 2 |
| NHL totals | | | 42 | 0 | 4 | 4 | 16 | — | — | — | — | — |
| DEL totals | | | 221 | 14 | 35 | 49 | 310 | 21 | 0 | 1 | 1 | 12 |

Medal record

Ice hockey

Representing Canada West

World Junior A Challenge
| Silver medal – second place | 2008 Camrose | |

Representing Canada Atlantic

World U-17 Hockey Challenge
| Bronze medal – third place | 2005 Lethbridge | |

=== International ===
| Year | Team | Event | Result | GP | G | A | Pts | PIM |
|---|---|---|---|---|---|---|---|---|
| 2005 | Canada Atlantic | U17 | 3rd place, bronze medalist(s) | 6 | 0 | 2 | 2 | 8 |
| 2005 | Canada | U18 | 1st place, gold medalist(s) | 5 | 0 | 0 | 0 | 8 |
| Junior totals | | | | 11 | 0 | 2 | 2 | 16 |

== Awards and honours ==
| Award | Year |
QMJHL
| All-Rookie Team | 2006 |
AHL
| Best Plus/Minus (+43) | 2014 |
| Calder Cup champion | 2015 |
