= Seth Helgeson =

American ice hockey player (born 1990)

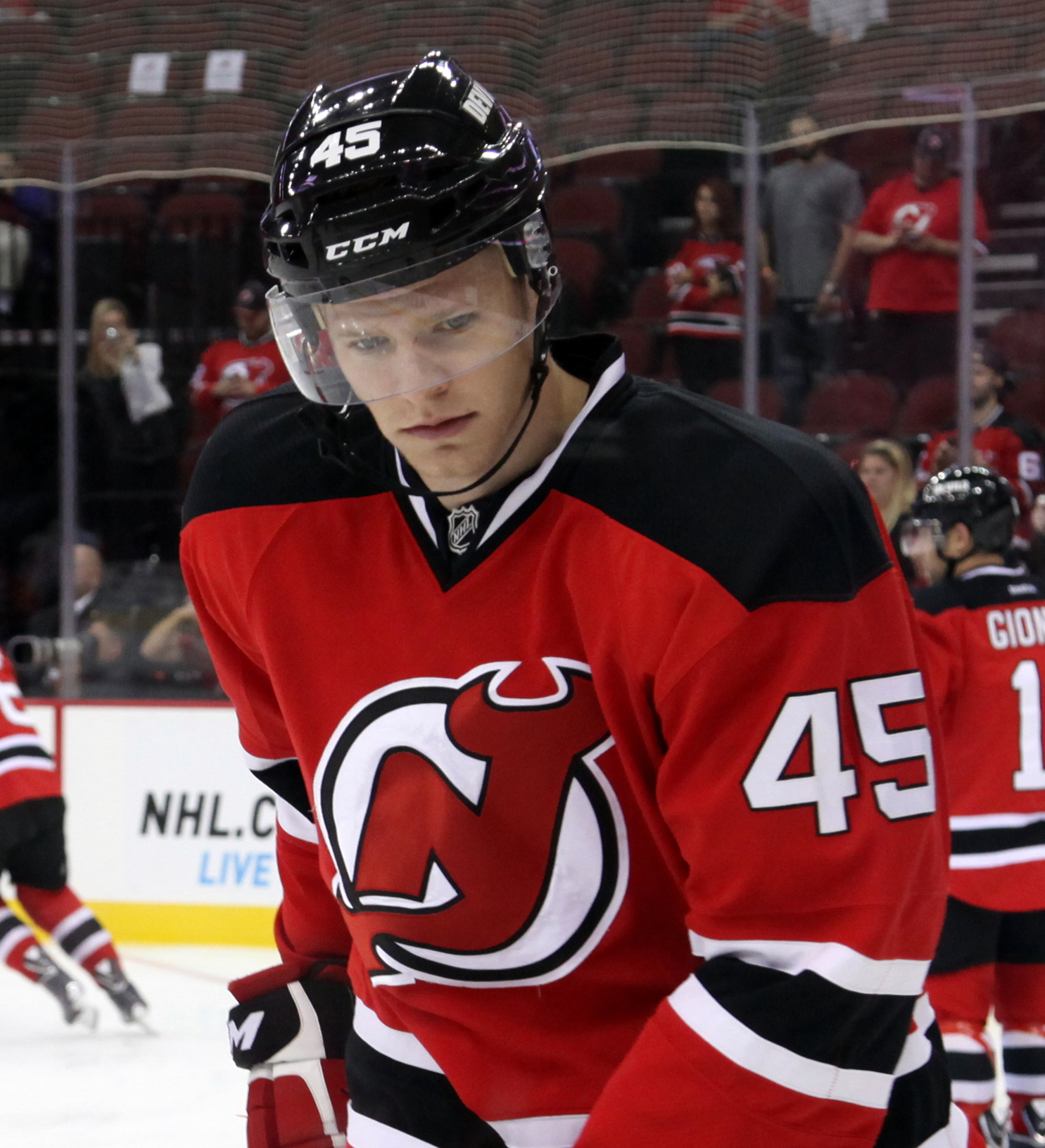
- Helgeson during a pre-season game in September 2014.
- Born: October 8, 1990 (age 35) Faribault, Minnesota, U.S.
- Height: 6 ft 4 in (193 cm)
- Weight: 215 lb (98 kg; 15 st 5 lb)
- Position: Defense
- Shoots: Left
- AHL team Former teams: Free agent New Jersey Devils
- NHL draft: 114th overall, 2009; New Jersey Devils
- Playing career: 2013–present

Medal record

Ice hockey

Representing United States

World Junior A Challenge
Gold medal – first place	2008 Camrose	
Bronze medal – third place	2007 Trail	

Seth Helgeson (born October 8, 1990) is an American professional ice hockey defenseman who is currently an unrestricted free agent. He most recently played for the Bridgeport Islanders of the American Hockey League (AHL). Helgeson was selected by the New Jersey Devils in the 4th round (114th overall) of the 2009 NHL entry draft.

== Playing career ==
=== Amateur ===
After completing two seasons at Faribault High, Helgeson attended the 2007 Sioux City Musketeers of the USHL training camp. He subsequently joined the team for their 2007–08 season. On November 19, 2008, Helgeson committed to play NCAA Division I hockey with the Minnesota Golden Gophers men's ice hockey team. While playing with the Sioux City Musketeers, Helgeson was selected for the 2009 USHL All-Star Game.

In his freshman season with the Minnesota Golden Gophers, Helgeson played in 31 games and recorded one goal. His only goal came during the 2010 WCHA playoffs against North Dakota and was the game winning goal to tie the teams in the series. North Dakota ended up winning the series 2–1. He was awarded the Donald M. Clark Community Service award by the Gophers at the conclusion of the season.

In his sophomore season, Helgeson played in 36 games and recorded a new career high seven points. He was again awarded the Donald M. Clark Community Service award at the conclusion of the season.

In his junior year, Helgeson recorded an uptake in scoring and set new career highs in goals, assists, and points. He was also named to the All-WCHA Academic Team.

During the 2012–13 season, Helgeson was the sole senior on the team and served as an alternate captain. At the end of the season, he had played in 121 consecutive games for the Gophers and led the team in penalty minutes. He was also named to the All-WCHA Academic Team for the second time.

=== Professional ===
On April 5, 2013, the Albany Devils of the American Hockey League (AHL) signed Helgeson to an amateur tryout agreement, allowing the defenseman to suit up with the AHL team for their final four games of the 2012–13 season.

On November 27, 2013, the New Jersey Devils of the NHL recalled Helgeson from the Albany Devils, under emergency conditions, however it turned out he was not needed and was returned to Albany after the morning skate.

After a strong training camp with the Devils for the 2014–15 season, Helgeson was recalled by New Jersey from Albany on November 11, 2014 to replace the injured Bryce Salvador, and immediately made his NHL debut, registering an assist in a 3–1 victory over the Minnesota Wild.

On July 1, 2017, having left the Devils as a free agent, Helgeson signed with cross-town rivals the New York Islanders on a one-year, two-way contract. On October 7, he was named an alternate captain for the Bridgeport Sound Tigers, the Islanders AHL affiliate.

On July 2, 2018, Helgeson stayed with the Islanders organization and signed a two-year, two-way contract.

After three seasons with the Sound Tigers, Helgeson as a free agent from the Islanders, opted to continue his tenure within the organization by signing a one-year AHL contract with the Sound Tigers on October 29, 2020.

== Career statistics ==
			Regular season					Playoffs
Season	Team	League	GP	G	A	Pts	PIM	GP	G	A	Pts	PIM
2006–07	Faribault High	MNHS	27	19	17	36	0	—	—	—	—	—
2007–08	Sioux City Musketeers	USHL	58	3	8	11	41	4	0	1	1	2
2008–09	Sioux City Musketeers	USHL	58	4	12	16	64	—	—	—	—	—
2009–10	University of Minnesota	WCHA	31	1	0	1	24	—	—	—	—	—
2010–11	University of Minnesota	WCHA	36	1	6	7	66	—	—	—	—	—
2011–12	University of Minnesota	WCHA	43	5	9	14	70	—	—	—	—	—
2012–13	University of Minnesota	WCHA	40	0	5	5	62	—	—	—	—	—
2012–13	Albany Devils	AHL	4	0	0	0	2	—	—	—	—	—
2013–14	Albany Devils	AHL	75	1	9	10	100	4	0	0	0	2
2014–15	Albany Devils	AHL	49	2	10	12	58	—	—	—	—	—
2014–15	New Jersey Devils	NHL	22	0	2	2	18	—	—	—	—	—
2015–16	Albany Devils	AHL	42	2	5	7	52	11	0	4	4	14
2015–16	New Jersey Devils	NHL	19	0	1	1	17	—	—	—	—	—
2016–17	Albany Devils	AHL	48	2	7	9	50	4	0	1	1	2
2016–17	New Jersey Devils	NHL	9	1	0	1	15	—	—	—	—	—
2017–18	Bridgeport Sound Tigers	AHL	76	1	11	12	137	—	—	—	—	—
2018–19	Bridgeport Sound Tigers	AHL	74	1	13	14	132	5	0	1	1	4
2019–20	Bridgeport Sound Tigers	AHL	63	1	9	10	95	—	—	—	—	—
2020–21	Bridgeport Sound Tigers	AHL	23	1	2	3	36	—	—	—	—	—
2021–22	Bridgeport Islanders	AHL	69	3	4	7	94	6	0	0	0	4
2022–23	Bridgeport Islanders	AHL	72	1	8	9	109	—	—	—	—	—
2023–24	Bridgeport Islanders	AHL	70	1	4	5	82	—	—	—	—	—
2024–25	Bridgeport Islanders	AHL	7	0	0	0	5	—	—	—	—	—
NHL totals			50	1	3	4	50	—	—	—	—	—

== Awards and honors ==
Award	Year	Ref
USHL
USHL All-Star Game	2009	
College
NCAA (WCHA) All-Academic Team	2012, 2013	
Donald M. Clark Community Service Award	2010, 2011	
