= Craig Smith (ice hockey) =

American ice hockey player (born 1989)

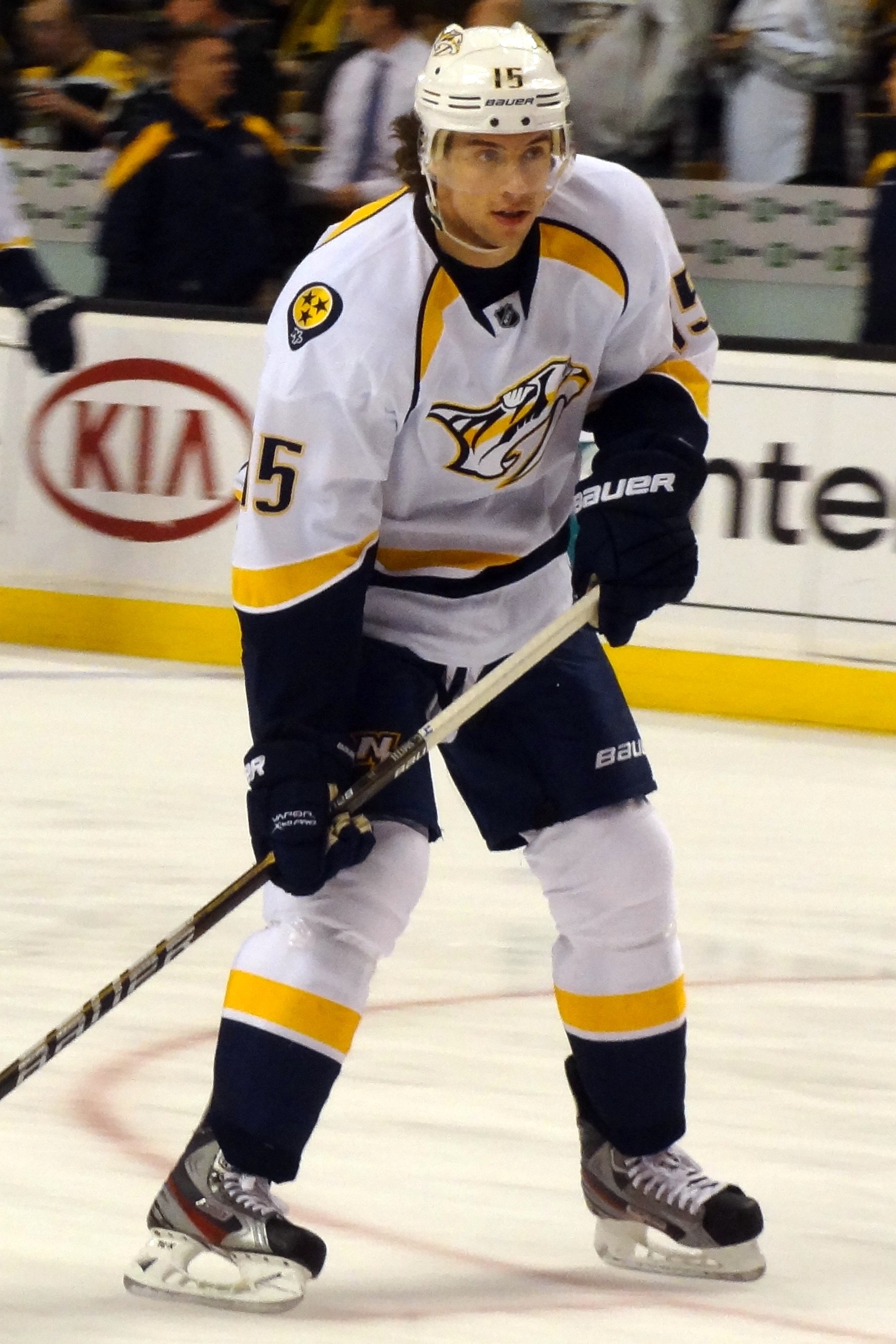
- Smith with the Nashville Predators in 2012
- Born: September 5, 1989 (age 36) Madison, Wisconsin, U.S.
- Height: 6 ft 1 in (185 cm)
- Weight: 203 lb (92 kg; 14 st 7 lb)
- Position: Forward
- Shot: Right
- Played for: Nashville Predators; KalPa; Boston Bruins; Washington Capitals; Dallas Stars; Chicago Blackhawks; Detroit Red Wings
- National team: United States
- NHL draft: 98th overall, 2009; Nashville Predators
- Playing career: 2011–2025

Craig Smith (born September 5, 1989) is an American former professional ice hockey forward who played 14 seasons in the National Hockey League (NHL). He was selected by the Nashville Predators in the fourth round, 98th overall, of the 2009 NHL entry draft, and also played for the Boston Bruins, Washington Capitals, Dallas Stars, Chicago Blackhawks, and Detroit Red Wings.

== Playing career ==
Smith attended La Follette High School in Madison, Wisconsin playing for head coach Jeff Weum and leading the team in scoring as a freshman. His junior year of high school he ended up being drafted by the Waterloo Black Hawks of the USHL. Smith played three seasons (2006/07, 2007/08, & 2008/09) with the Black Hawks located in Waterloo, Iowa. During this time he achieved 49 goals and 68 assists (117 points) in 157 regular season games. He was named to the USHL First All-Star Team for the 2008–09 season.

Following his time in Waterloo, Smith attended the University of Wisconsin - Madison where he was a member of the men's hockey team for two seasons (2009/10 & 2010/11) of which he was the captain for the 2010/11 season. Smith managed 27 goals and 49 assists (159 points) in 82 regular season games at Wisconsin.

Smith also participated at the 2011 IIHF World Championship as a member of the United States men's national ice hockey team. He then went on to play two years at the University of Wisconsin for the Badgers ice hockey team.

Smith was drafted 98th overall in the fourth round of the 2009 NHL entry draft to the Nashville Predators. On October 7, 2011, in a game against the Columbus Blue Jackets, Smith made his NHL debut and scored his first NHL goal, which came against Steve Mason. He played ten seasons (2012-2020) with the Predators during which he played four games with the Predator's AHL affiliate the Milwaukee Admirals in the 2012/13 season. Smith spent the beginning of the 2012/13 season playing for KalPa of the SM-I in Finland due to the 2012 NHL Lockout.

Following the 2014–15 season, Smith became a restricted free agent under the NHL Collective Bargaining Agreement. The Predators made him a qualifying offer to retain his NHL rights and, on July 5, 2015, Smith filed for Salary Arbitration. On July 20, prior to his scheduled meeting, Smith entered into a new five-year, $21.25 million contract with the Predators.

On September 29, 2020, after nine seasons with Nashville, Smith informed the team that he would not sign a new contract with them and that he would become a free agent. On October 10, he signed a three-year, $9.3 million contract with the Boston Bruins. Smith played two and a half seasons in Boston (2020-2023) before being traded to the Washington Capitals during the 2022/23 NHL season.

On May 19, 2021, Smith scored the Game 3 double overtime winner for the Bruins against the Washington Capitals, giving them a 2–1 series lead in their first round series. He scored a goal when Capitals goalie Ilya Samsonov misplayed the puck behind the net. Capitals captain Alex Ovechkin visibly scolded him in Russian after the game ended. The Bruins then went on to win the series against the Capitals in five games.

On February 23, 2023, Smith (along with 3 draft picks) was traded from the Bruins to the Washington Capitals in exchange for Garnet Hathaway and Dmitry Orlov. Following the 2022/23 season Smith re-entered free agency and signed a one-year contract worth one million dollars with the Dallas Stars for the 2023/24 season on the first day of free agency.

After one season with the Dallas Stars, Smith again became a free agent and signed a one-year, $1 million contract with the Chicago Blackhawks on July 1, 2024. On March 7, 2025, Smith was traded to the Detroit Red Wings, along with Petr Mrázek, in exchange for Joe Veleno. Prior to being traded, he recorded nine goals and seven assists in 40 games with the Blackhawks.

After going un-signed through the 2025 offseason and first two months of the 2025–26 season, Smith announced his retirement from hockey on December 8, 2025.

== Personal ==
Smith states he began playing hockey when he was three years old. He then played hockey in high school before being drafted into the USHL. After a successful USHL career Smith was drafted into the NHL by the Nashville Predators. Following his USHL career he joined the University of Wisconsin's Men's hockey team. From there he earned a spot on Nashville's NHL roster.

In 2009, during an interview with Wisconsin athletics, Smith is quoted saying his favorite school subject is math, his favorite video game is Mario Kart, his favorite TV show was Friends, and his favorite music artist was the Red Hot Chili Peppers.

== Career statistics ==
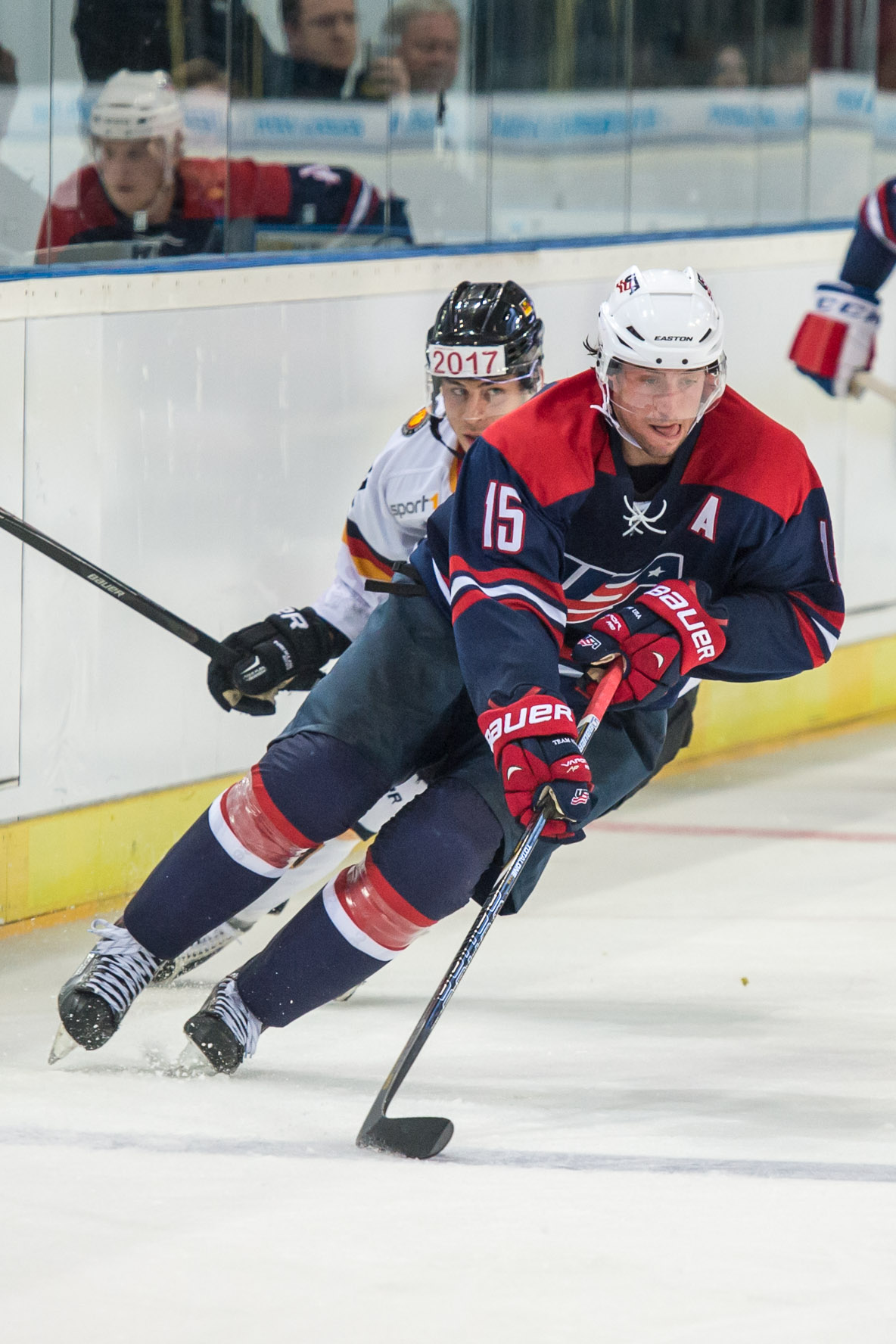
- Smith with the United States men's national hockey team in a game against German's men's national hockey team.

Medal record

Ice hockey

Representing United States

World Championships
Bronze medal – third place	2013 Sweden/Finland	

World Junior A Challenge
Gold medal – first place	2008 Camrose	
Bronze medal – third place	2007 Trail	

=== Regular season and playoffs ===
			Regular season					Playoffs
Season	Team	League	GP	G	A	Pts	PIM	GP	G	A	Pts	PIM
2004–05	La Follette High School	HS-WI	20	16	24	40		—	—	—	—	—
2005–06	La Follette High School	HS-WI	20	35	26	61		—	—	—	—	—
2006–07	Waterloo Black Hawks	USHL	45	8	10	18	28	4	0	1	1	8
2007–08	Waterloo Black Hawks	USHL	58	13	10	23	90	11	2	3	5	8
2008–09	Waterloo Black Hawks	USHL	54	28	48	76	108	3	1	3	4	26
2009–10	University of Wisconsin	WCHA	41	8	25	33	72	—	—	—	—	—
2010–11	University of Wisconsin	WCHA	41	19	24	43	87	—	—	—	—	—
2011–12	Nashville Predators	NHL	72	14	22	36	30	2	0	1	1	0
2012–13	KalPa	SM-l	8	4	4	8	20	—	—	—	—	—
2012–13	Nashville Predators	NHL	44	4	8	12	20	—	—	—	—	—
2012–13	Milwaukee Admirals	AHL	4	1	4	5	0	—	—	—	—	—
2013–14	Nashville Predators	NHL	79	24	28	52	22	—	—	—	—	—
2014–15	Nashville Predators	NHL	82	23	21	44	44	6	2	3	5	0
2015–16	Nashville Predators	NHL	82	21	16	37	40	11	1	1	2	4
2016–17	Nashville Predators	NHL	78	12	17	29	30	10	1	2	3	2
2017–18	Nashville Predators	NHL	79	25	26	51	24	13	2	2	4	2
2018–19	Nashville Predators	NHL	76	21	17	38	20	6	1	0	1	2
2019–20	Nashville Predators	NHL	69	18	13	31	34	4	0	0	0	2
2020–21	Boston Bruins	NHL	54	13	19	32	18	10	2	3	5	4
2021–22	Boston Bruins	NHL	74	16	20	36	28	7	0	0	0	2
2022–23	Boston Bruins	NHL	42	4	6	10	14	—	—	—	—	—
2022–23	Washington Capitals	NHL	22	5	1	6	4	—	—	—	—	—
2023–24	Dallas Stars	NHL	75	11	9	20	33	14	0	2	2	2
2024–25	Chicago Blackhawks	NHL	40	9	7	16	28	—	—	—	—	—
2024–25	Detroit Red Wings	NHL	19	0	2	2	6	—	—	—	—	—
NHL totals			987	220	232	452	395	83	9	14	23	20

=== International ===
Year	Team	Event	Result	GP	G	A	Pts	PIM
2008	United States	WJAC	1st place, gold medalist(s)	4	0	0	0	0
2009	United States	WJAC	1st place, gold medalist(s)	5	3	5	8	2
2011	United States	WC	8th	7	3	3	6	4
2012	United States	WC	7th	4	0	2	2	2
2013	United States	WC	3rd place, bronze medalist(s)	10	4	10	14	18
2014	United States	WC	6th	8	3	5	8	10
Senior totals				29	10	20	30	34

== Awards and honors ==
Award	Year
USHL
All-Star Game	2009
First All-Star Team	2009
College
All-WCHA Rookie Team	2010
