= Andrew MacWilliam =

Canadian ice hockey player

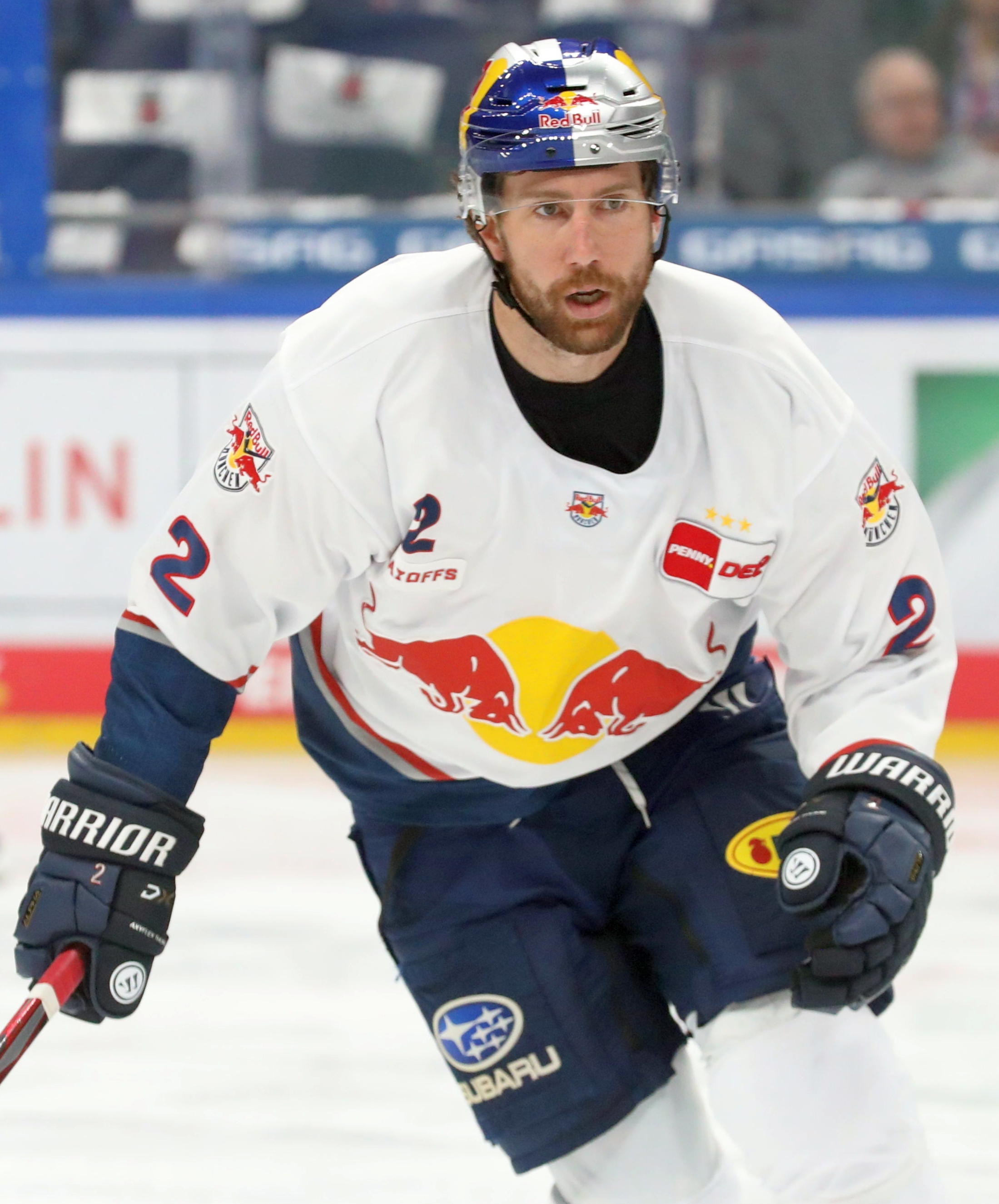
- MacWilliam with the EHC München in 2022
- Born: March 25, 1990 (age 36) Calgary, Alberta, Canada
- Height: 6 ft 2 in (188 cm)
- Weight: 214 lb (97 kg; 15 st 4 lb)
- Position: Defence
- Shoots: Left
- ICEHL team Former teams: HK Olimpija Ljubljana; Toronto Maple Leafs; Manitoba Moose; Albany Devils; Rochester Americans; EHC München; EC Red Bull Salzburg; Cardiff Devils
- NHL draft: 188th overall, 2008; Toronto Maple Leafs
- Playing career: 2009–present

Andrew Jay MacWilliam (born March 25, 1990) is a Canadian professional ice hockey defenceman who is currently playing with HK Olimpija Ljubljana of the ICE Hockey League (ICEHL).

== Playing career ==
Chosen in the 7th round of the 2008 Entry Draft (188th overall) by the Toronto Maple Leafs, he would make his NHL debut on March 11, 2015, recording 1 point in a 4–3 Toronto victory over the Buffalo Sabres. He was also named 3rd star of the game and went on to finish the season with the Toronto Maple Leafs, playing a total of 12 games. MacWilliam wore number 57 during his time with the Maple Leafs, becoming the first player in franchise history to wear the number.

On July 3, 2015, MacWilliam signed as a free agent to a one-year, two-way contract with the Winnipeg Jets. On July 1, 2016, as a free agent for a second consecutive season, MacWilliam left the Winnipeg Jets to sign a one-year, two-way deal with the New Jersey Devils.

On July 4, 2017, having left the Devils as a free agent, MacWilliam with slim NHL interest opted to continue in the AHL, signing a contract with the Rochester Americans, affiliate to the Buffalo Sabres.

With the following 2020–21 North American season delayed due to the COVID-19 pandemic, MacWilliam opted to pursue a career abroad, agreeing to an initial try-out with German three-time champions, EHC München of the DEL. On December 2, 2020, MacWilliam agreed to remain in Munich for the remainder of the 2020–21 season.

After two seasons in the DEL, MacWilliam left Germany and joined the neighbouring ICEHL, by signing a contract with the Red Bull sponsorship of EC Red Bull Salzburg on July 18, 2022.

After a lone season with Salzburg, MacWilliam returned to former club, EHC München of the DEL, for the 2023–24 season on June 7, 2023.

In July 2024, MacWilliam agreed terms to join UK EIHL side Cardiff Devils.

== Personal ==
Before his professional hockey career, MacWilliam attended the University of North Dakota, where he also played hockey and was honoured as captain in his senior year. He graduated with a degree in Business Management.

== Career statistics ==
			Regular season					Playoffs
Season	Team	League	GP	G	A	Pts	PIM	GP	G	A	Pts	PIM
2006–07	Camrose Kodiaks	AJHL	2	0	0	0	0	1	0	0	0	0
2007–08	Camrose Kodiaks	AJHL	54	0	13	13	130	18	0	5	5	49
2008–09	Camrose Kodiaks	AJHL	57	8	21	29	220	11	0	4	4	39
2009–10	U. of North Dakota	WCHA	43	0	3	3	87	—	—	—	—	—
2010–11	U. of North Dakota	WCHA	37	0	8	8	49	—	—	—	—	—
2011–12	U. of North Dakota	WCHA	42	2	5	7	75	—	—	—	—	—
2012–13	U. of North Dakota	WCHA	41	2	11	13	116	—	—	—	—	—
2012–13	Toronto Marlies	AHL	2	0	0	0	0	—	—	—	—	—
2013–14	Toronto Marlies	AHL	57	0	9	9	96	9	0	1	1	8
2014–15	Toronto Marlies	AHL	58	3	4	7	47	4	0	1	1	6
2014–15	Toronto Maple Leafs	NHL	12	0	2	2	12	—	—	—	—	—
2015–16	Manitoba Moose	AHL	72	1	14	15	86	—	—	—	—	—
2016–17	Albany Devils	AHL	63	0	5	5	100	—	—	—	—	—
2017–18	Rochester Americans	AHL	54	0	8	8	73	2	0	1	1	2
2018–19	Rochester Americans	AHL	66	3	7	10	90	3	0	0	0	4
2019–20	Rochester Americans	AHL	41	2	6	8	54	—	—	—	—	—
2020–21	EHC München	DEL	38	2	10	12	28	2	0	2	2	2
2021–22	EHC München	DEL	26	0	4	4	17	9	0	0	0	20
2022–23	EC Red Bull Salzburg	ICEHL	42	1	5	6	66	16	0	5	5	12
2023–24	EHC München	DEL	41	0	3	3	66	9	0	1	1	12
2024–25	Cardiff Devils	EIHL	48	3	12	15	94	4	0	4	4	2
2025–26	HK Olimpija	ICEHL	26	2	2	4	32	10	1	1	2	18
NHL totals			12	0	2	2	12	—	—	—	—	—
