= Eduard Reizvikh =

Russian ice hockey player

- Born: March 30, 1991 (age 34) Omsk, Russia
- Height: 1.78 m (5 ft 10 in)
- Weight: 69 kg (152 lb; 10 st 12 lb)
- Position: Goaltender
- Catches: Left
- KHL team: Avangard Omsk
- NHL draft: Undrafted
- Playing career: 2009–present

Eduard Reizvikh (Russian: Эдуард Рейзвих; born March 30, 1991, in Omsk) is a Russian professional ice hockey goaltender. He is currently playing with Avangard Omsk of the Kontinental Hockey League (KHL).

Reizvikh made his Kontinental Hockey League debut playing with Avangard Omsk during the 2009–10 KHL season.
