= Kirill Lebedev =

Russian ice hockey player (1991–2025)

- Born: 1 October 1991; Magnitogorsk, Chelyabinsk Oblast, Russian SFSR, USSR
- Died: 21 May 2025 (aged 33); Magnitogorsk, Russia
- Height: 6 ft 0 in (183 cm)
- Weight: 203 lb (92 kg; 14 st 7 lb)
- Position: Forward
- Shot: Left
- Played for: Metallurg Magnitogorsk; HC Sibir Novosibirsk; HC Sochi; Metallurg Novokuznetsk; Kunlun Red Star
- NHL draft: Undrafted
- Playing career: 2006–2022

Kirill Lebedev (1 October 1991 – 21 May 2025) was a Russian professional ice hockey forward who most recently played for Neftyanik Almetievsk of the Supreme Hockey League (VHL).

Lebedev made his KHL debut with Metallurg Magnitogorsk in the 2010–11 season.

Lebedev died on 21 May 2025, at the age of 33.
