= Dmitry Orlov (ice hockey) =

Russian ice hockey player (born 1991)

- Orlov with the San Jose Sharks in 2026
- Born: 23 July 1991 (age 35) Novokuznetsk, Russian SFSR, Soviet Union
- Height: 5 ft 11 in (180 cm)
- Weight: 215 lb (98 kg; 15 st 5 lb)
- Position: Defence
- Shoots: Left
- NHL team Former teams: San Jose Sharks; Metallurg Novokuznetsk; Washington Capitals; Boston Bruins; Carolina Hurricanes
- National team: Russia
- NHL draft: 55th overall, 2009; Washington Capitals
- Playing career: 2007–present

Dmitry Vladimirovich Orlov (Russian: Дмитрий Владимирович Орлов; born 23 July 1991) is a Russian professional ice hockey player who is a defenceman for the San Jose Sharks of the National Hockey League (NHL).

Orlov was selected 55th overall in the second round of the 2009 NHL entry draft by the Washington Capitals, with whom he won the Stanley Cup in 2018 after defeating the Vegas Golden Knights in the finals. He represents Russia in international competition, winning gold medals at the 2011 World Junior Ice Hockey Championships and the 2014 IIHF World Championship. He has also played for the Boston Bruins and Carolina Hurricanes.

== Early life ==
Orlov was born on 23 July 1991 in Novokuznetsk, Russia. Growing up, he played against Vladimir Tarasenko as a defenceman with a youth team in Novokuznetsk.

== Playing career ==
Leading up to the 2009 NHL entry draft, Orlov was ranked 29th amongst international skaters by International Scouting Services and was described as being "a very hard-nosed player that everyone would love to have on his team." He was also described by the NHL’s European Scouting Service as being "an extremely skilled offensive-minded defenceman with excellent hand-eye coordination." Orlov was eventually drafted in the second round, 55th overall, by the Washington Capitals. Following the draft, Orlov returned to Russia where he posted a breakout campaign for Metallurg Novokuznetsk during the 2010–11 season. Throughout the season, he tallied 12 points and was the top defenceman for Russia at the 2011 World Junior Championships.

=== Washington Capitals ===
Once the 2010–11 KHL season concluded, Orlov made his North American professional debut with the Hershey Bears, the American Hockey League (AHL) affiliate of the Capitals. While playing in the Bears' final 19 games of the regular season and six postseason contests, Orlov tallied two goals and 10 points. He made his AHL debut on 26 February 2011 in a 4–3 win over the Albany Devils where he also registered an assist. After recording another assist in his second game with the Bears, the Capitals signed Orlov to a three-year, entry-level contract. Orlov later scored his first North American professional goal in a 3–2 loss to the Worcester Sharks on 9 March 2011.

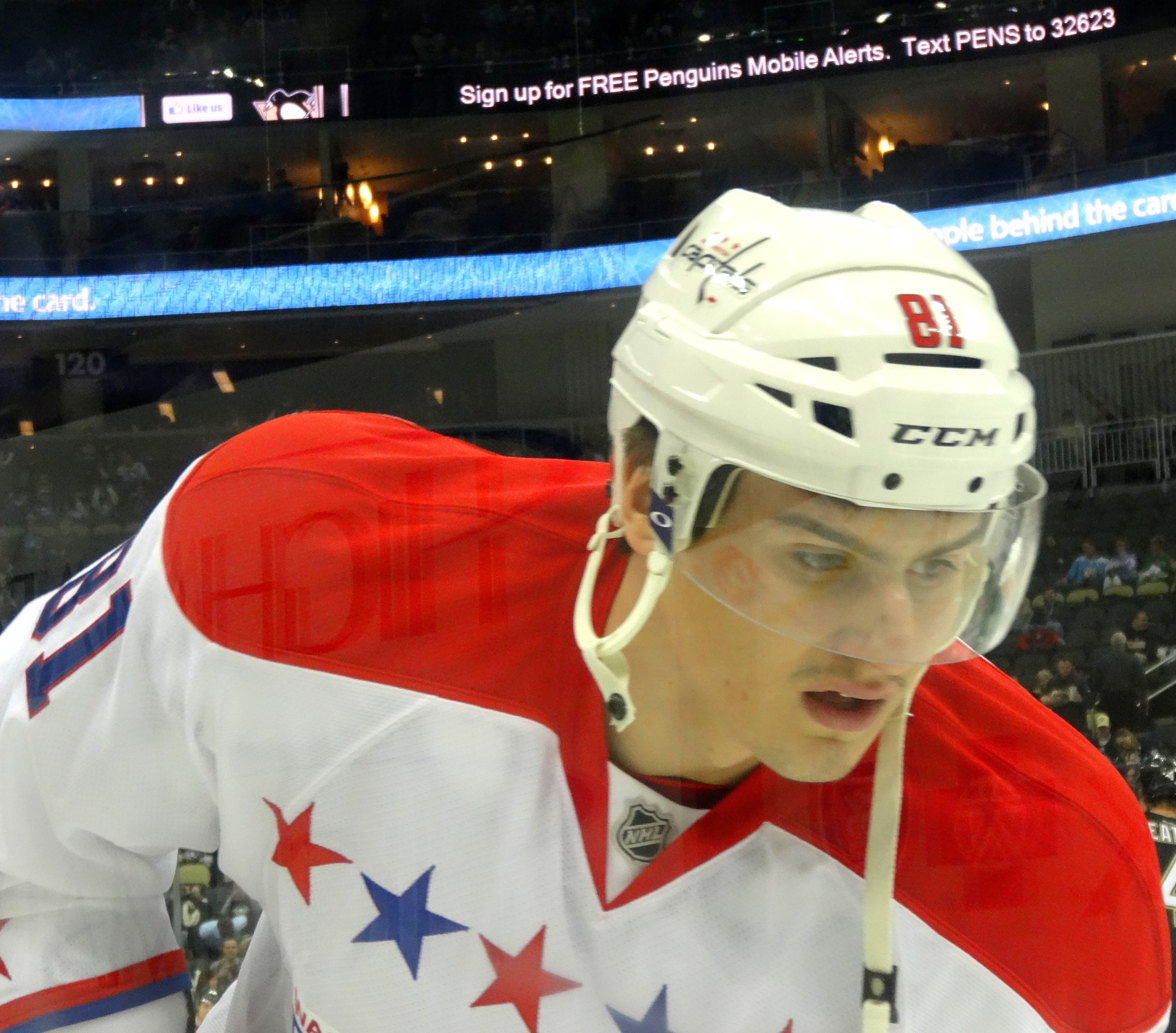
Orlov with the Capitals in March 2013.

Once the season concluded, Orlov was invited to participate in the Capitals Rookie Camp in September 2011. While attending both the Capitals Rookie and Development Camps, Orlov was praised for his "high-risk, high-reward style of play." Despite this, he was subsequently re-assigned to the AHL prior to the start of the 2011–12 season. Orlov recorded four goals and nine points through 15 games with the Bears before he earned his first NHL call-up on 20 November 2011. He made his NHL debut the following day against the Phoenix Coyotes where he played 11 minutes and 56 minutes and recorded three hits and one attempted shot on goal. Orlov remained with the Capitals following his debut and scored his first career NHL goal on 15 January 2012 against Cam Ward of the Carolina Hurricanes. He finished the season with three goals and 16 assists for 19 points through 60 games with the Capitals.

As a result of the 2012–13 NHL lockout, Orlov was assigned directly to the Hershey Bears to start the 2012–13 season. While with the Bears, Orlov suffered from two injuries that kept him out of the lineup for a period of time. His first injury came in November while his second came in December and caused him to miss attending the Capitals training camp in January. He ended up playing five games with the Capitals once the season began and tallied one assist.

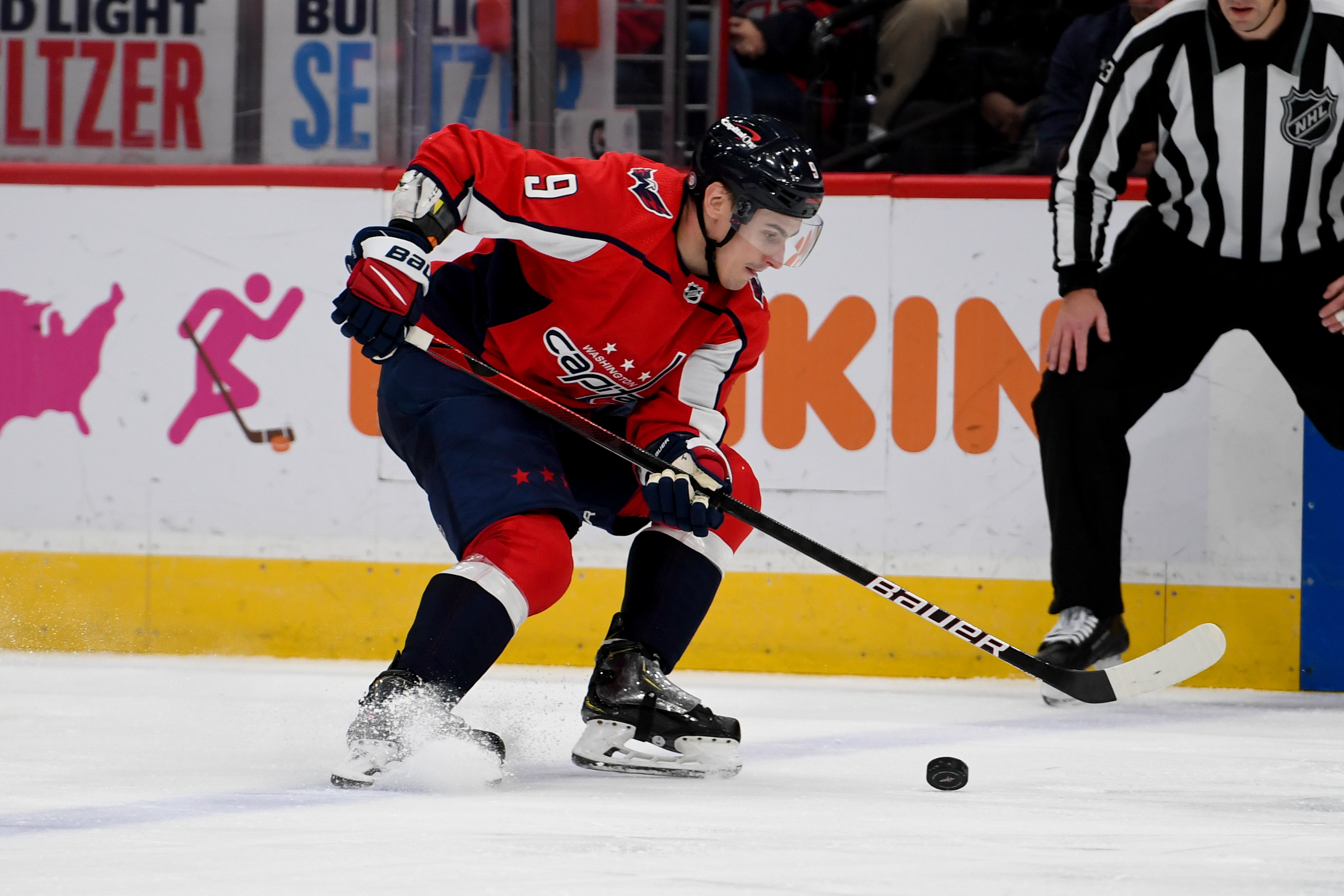
Orlov skating with the puck during a game in January 2022

The 2013–14 season also began slowly for Orlov. Due to a clause in his contract, Orlov was required to be on the Capital's active NHL roster for a total of 30 days or he would be allowed to join the KHL. As such, he was constantly being recalled and returned to the AHL without appearing in a game. He eventually earned a permanent spot in the line-up and remained with the Capitals for 54 games. During this time, he was suspended two games and forfeited $7,076.92 for boarding Brayden Schenn during a game. Following the suspension, the Capitals signed Orlov to a two-year contract extension worth $4 million on 13 March. Orlov finished the season with three goals and 11 points in 54 games with the Capitals before joining Team Russia at the 2014 IIHF World Championship. While playing at the tournament, he suffered a broken wrist which forced him to miss most of the 2014–15 NHL season. In March 2015, Orlov was re-assigned to the Hershey Bears on a conditioning stint after missing 74 games.

After remaining sidelined for nearly a year, Orlov joined the Capitals for their 2015–16 training camp and pre-season. He played with the Capitals through all 82 games while on their third line pairing with either Nate Schmidt or Taylor Chorney. His playing time increased following injuries to Brooks Orpik and John Carlson and he moved up the defensive pairing once Orpik returned. He also accumulated only 26 penalty minutes and was the Capitals nominee for the Bill Masterton Memorial Trophy. Orlov helped the Capitals clinch the President's Trophy as they qualified for the 2016 Stanley Cup playoffs.

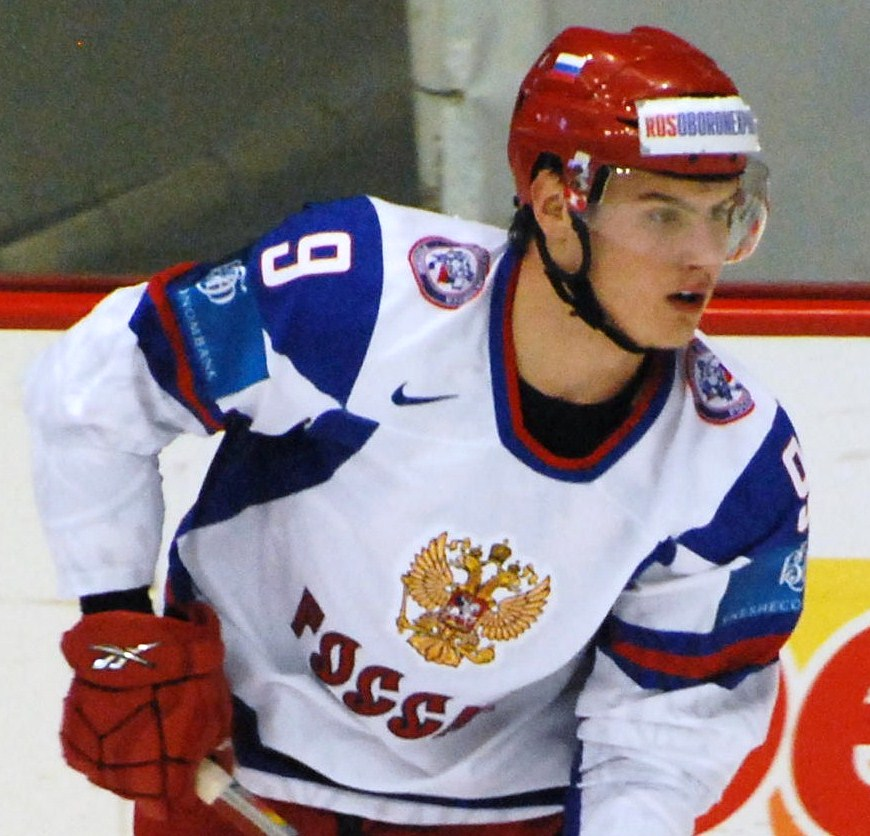

Medal record

Ice hockey

Representing Russia

World Championships
Gold medal – first place	2014 Belarus	
Bronze medal – third place	2016 Russia	
Bronze medal – third place	2017 Germany/France	
Bronze medal – third place	2019 Slovakia	

World Junior Championships
Gold medal – first place	2011 United States	

IIHF World U18 Championship
Silver medal – second place	2008 Russia	
Silver medal – second place	2009 United States	

Orlov finished the 2016–17 season with career-highs in assists, points, and plus-minus through 82 games. As such, Orlov signed a six-year, $30.6 million contract extension with the Capitals on 30 June 2017. That next season, he helped the Capitals win their first Stanley Cup in franchise history.

On 19 January 2022, Orlov was suspended two games and forfeited $51,000.00 for kneeing Winnipeg Jets forward Nikolaj Ehlers during a game.

=== Boston Bruins ===
While in his final year under contract with the Capitals in the 2022–23 season and contributing with 19 points in 43 regular season games, Orlov's 14-year tenure within the Capitals ended as he was traded to Minnesota and after the Wild retained part of his salary he was then sent to the league-leading Boston Bruins on 23 February 2023. Teammate Garnet Hathaway was traded in a separate trade on the same day in exchange for Craig Smith, a 2023 first-round pick, a 2025 second-round pick and a 2024 third-round pick. Orlov made his debut with the Bruins on 25 February, against the Vancouver Canucks, recorded two assists against the Edmonton Oilers on 27 February, and scored his first two goals as a Bruin in the following night's game against the Calgary Flames. In Orlov's first four games with the Bruins he tallied eight points, including back-to-back three-point games, making him the first Bruin to do so since Zdeno Chára in 2011. Orlov's scoring burst in his first games as a Bruin led him to be named the NHL's First Star of the Week on 6 March. On 11 March, he became the fastest defenseman to reach ten points in Bruins history, doing so in just seven games with the club.

=== Carolina Hurricanes ===
In the following off-season, having left the Bruins as a free agent, Orlov was signed to a two-year $15.5 million contract with the Carolina Hurricanes on 1 July 2023.

=== San Jose Sharks ===
Following the expiration of his contract with Carolina, Orlov signed a two-year, $13 million contract with the San Jose Sharks on 3 July 2025.

== International play ==
Orlov represented Russia at the 2010 and 2011 World Junior Championships, getting named to the 2011 Tournament All-Star Team and winning the 2011 gold medal.

== Career statistics ==
=== Regular season and playoffs ===
			Regular season					Playoffs
Season	Team	League	GP	G	A	Pts	PIM	GP	G	A	Pts	PIM
2007–08	Metallurg–2 Novokuznetsk	RUS.3	12	1	4	5	8	—	—	—	—	—
2007–08	Metallurg Novokuznetsk	RSL	6	0	0	0	0	—	—	—	—	—
2008–09	Metallurg Novokuznetsk	KHL	15	1	0	1	4	—	—	—	—	—
2008–09	Metallurg–2 Novokuznetsk	RUS.3	4	0	1	1	2	—	—	—	—	—
2009–10	Metallurg Novokuznetsk	KHL	41	4	3	7	49	—	—	—	—	—
2009–10	Kuznetskie Medvedi	MHL	7	7	6	13	6	17	9	10	19	26
2010–11	Metallurg Novokuznetsk	KHL	45	2	11	13	43	—	—	—	—	—
2010–11	Kuznetskie Medvedi	MHL	1	0	0	0	0	—	—	—	—	—
2010–11	Hershey Bears	AHL	19	2	7	9	12	6	0	1	1	4
2011–12	Hershey Bears	AHL	15	4	5	9	12	—	—	—	—	—
2011–12	Washington Capitals	NHL	60	3	16	19	18	—	—	—	—	—
2012–13	Hershey Bears	AHL	31	3	14	17	20	4	1	2	3	4
2012–13	Washington Capitals	NHL	5	0	1	1	0	—	—	—	—	—
2013–14	Hershey Bears	AHL	11	3	6	9	4	—	—	—	—	—
2013–14	Washington Capitals	NHL	54	3	8	11	19	—	—	—	—	—
2014–15	Hershey Bears	AHL	3	0	3	3	4	—	—	—	—	—
2015–16	Washington Capitals	NHL	82	8	21	29	26	11	0	1	1	2
2016–17	Washington Capitals	NHL	82	6	27	33	51	13	0	3	3	2
2017–18	Washington Capitals	NHL	82	10	21	31	22	24	2	6	8	4
2018–19	Washington Capitals	NHL	82	3	26	29	33	7	0	4	4	4
2019–20	Washington Capitals	NHL	69	4	23	27	36	8	0	3	3	4
2020–21	Washington Capitals	NHL	51	8	14	22	20	5	0	3	3	6
2021–22	Washington Capitals	NHL	76	12	23	35	44	6	0	1	1	2
2022–23	Washington Capitals	NHL	43	3	16	19	10	—	—	—	—	—
2022–23	Boston Bruins	NHL	23	4	13	17	12	7	0	8	8	2
2023–24	Carolina Hurricanes	NHL	82	6	20	26	36	11	2	4	6	14
2024–25	Carolina Hurricanes	NHL	76	6	22	28	24	15	0	4	4	10
2025–26	San Jose Sharks	NHL	82	3	34	37	48	—	—	—	—	—
KHL totals			101	7	14	21	96	—	—	—	—	—
NHL totals			949	79	285	364	399	107	4	37	41	50

=== International ===
Year	Team	Event	Result	GP	G	A	Pts	PIM
2008	Russia	U17	5th	5	2	7	9	6
2008	Russia	U18	2nd place, silver medalist(s)	6	0	1	1	0
2008	Russia	HG18	2nd place, silver medalist(s)	4	1	0	1	6
2009	Russia	U18	2nd place, silver medalist(s)	7	2	2	4	6
2010	Russia	WJC	6th	6	0	4	4	4
2011	Russia	WJC	1st place, gold medalist(s)	7	1	8	9	6
2014	Russia	WC	1st place, gold medalist(s)	3	0	1	1	2
2016	Russia	WC	3rd place, bronze medalist(s)	6	0	3	3	2
2016	Russia	WCH	4th	4	0	0	0	4
2017	Russia	WC	3rd place, bronze medalist(s)	5	1	0	1	0
2019	Russia	WC	3rd place, bronze medalist(s)	10	2	4	6	2
2021	ROC	WC	5th	3	0	2	2	0
Junior totals				35	6	22	28	28
Senior totals				31	3	10	13	10

== Awards and honours ==
Award	Year
MHL
Playoff MVP	2010
NHL
Stanley Cup champion	2018
International
WJC First Team All-Star	2011
