= Jake Evans (ice hockey) =

Canadian ice hockey player (born 1996)

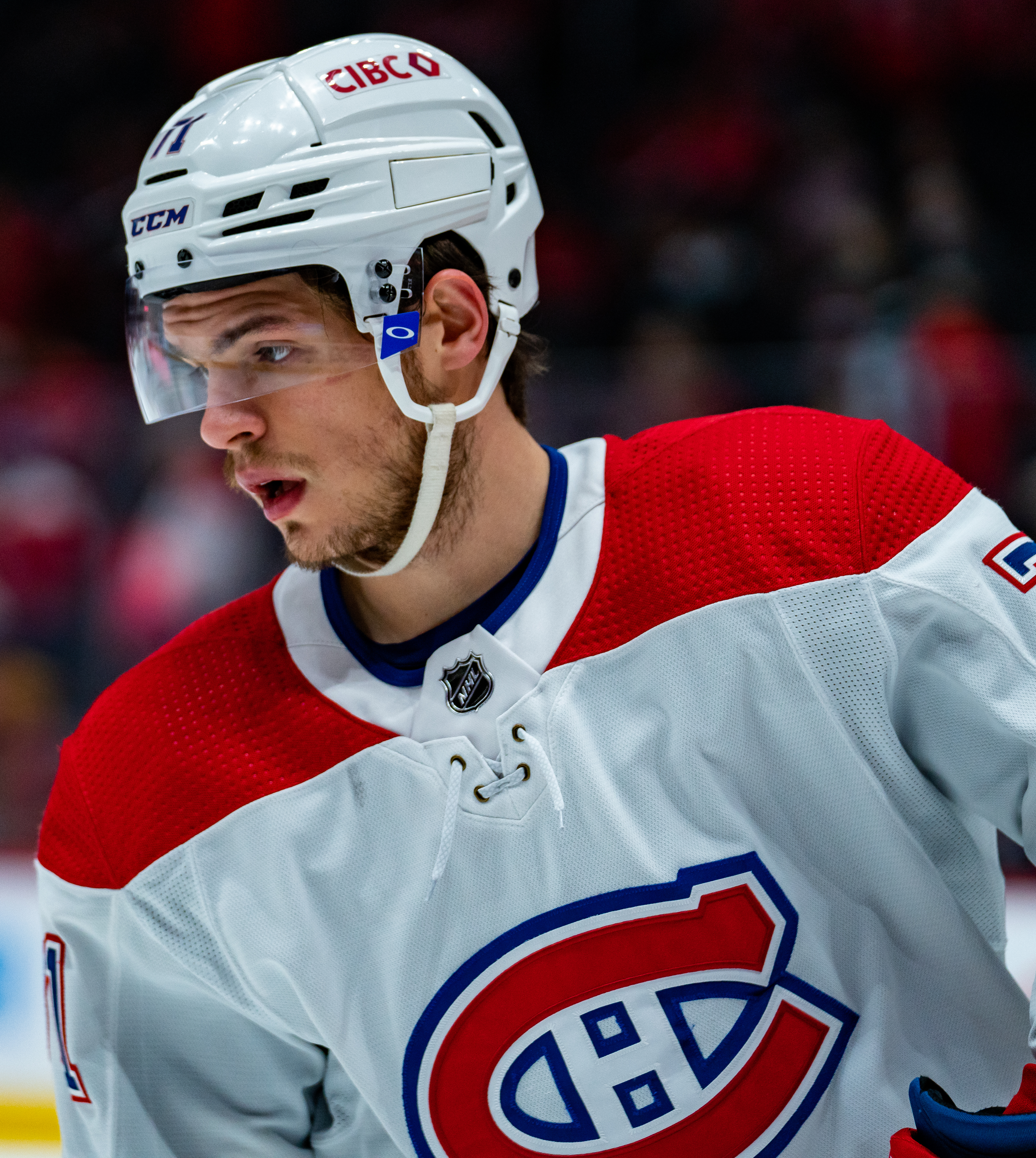
- Evans with the Montreal Canadiens in 2021
- Born: June 2, 1996 (age 30) Toronto, Ontario, Canada
- Height: 6 ft 0 in (183 cm)
- Weight: 190 lb (86 kg; 13 st 8 lb)
- Position: Centre
- Shoots: Right
- NHL team: Montreal Canadiens
- NHL draft: 207th overall, 2014; Montreal Canadiens
- Playing career: 2018–present

Jake Evans (born June 2, 1996) is a Canadian professional ice hockey player who is a centre for the Montreal Canadiens of the National Hockey League (NHL). He was selected in the seventh round, 207th overall, by the Canadiens in the 2014 NHL entry draft.

== Playing career ==
=== Early years ===
As a youth, Evans played with the Mississauga Rebels of the Greater Toronto Hockey League (GTHL) and won the OHL Cup during his midget year. Thereafter, he joined the St. Michael's Buzzers of the Ontario Junior Hockey League (OJHL) for two seasons beginning in 2012, where he helped lead his team to a championship berth at the annual Dudley-Hewitt Cup and was likewise named as finalist for Rookie of the Year across the Canadian Junior Hockey League (CJHL).

=== Collegiate ===
Evans committed to play collegiately for the University of Notre Dame Fighting Irish of the National Collegiate Athletic Association (NCAA) beginning in the 2014–15 season, and was named as team captain prior to his senior year in September 2017.

=== Professional ===
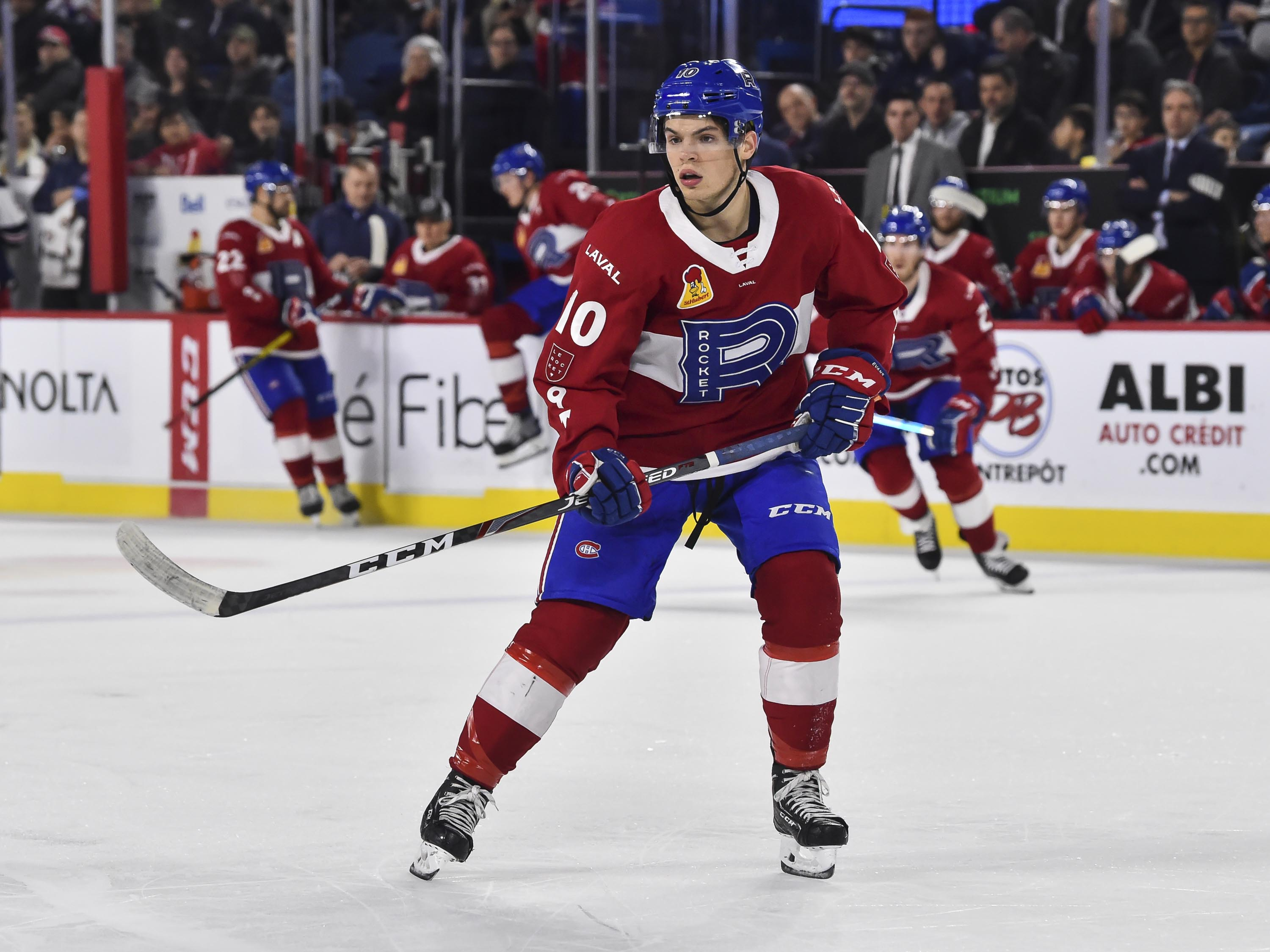
Evans in 2019

Following his senior campaign with the Fighting Irish, Evans was signed to an entry-level contract by draft team the Montreal Canadiens in April 2018. Initially assigned to the Laval Rocket, the Canadiens' American Hockey League (AHL) affiliate, he received his first NHL recall during the course of the 2019–20 season. On February 10, 2020, Evans scored his first career NHL goal in a 3–2 loss to the Arizona Coyotes.

On June 2, 2021, Evans scored his first career NHL playoff goal during Game 1 of the second round of the 2021 Stanley Cup playoffs, but in retaliation received a hard open ice hit from Winnipeg Jets forward Mark Scheifele that resulted in him being stretchered off the ice. For his actions, Scheifele was suspended for four games following the hit. Evans subsequently missed the remainder of the series against the Jets as well as the entire semi-final matchup with the Vegas Golden Knights due to a concussion, but returned as a replacement for teammate Joel Armia during the 2021 Stanley Cup Finals versus the Tampa Bay Lightning. He later signed a three-year, $5.1 million contract extension with Montreal that October.

Entering play for the 2024–25 season, Evans reached a series of milestones in the early stages of the campaign. On November 16, 2024, he registered his 100th career NHL point in a game against the Columbus Blue Jackets, effectively becoming the first draft pick in franchise history selected in the seventh-round to reach this milestone. Thereafter, he skated in his 300th career NHL game versus the Detroit Red Wings on December 20. In March 2025, Evans agreed to a four-year contract extension with the Canadiens.

Evans had 12 goals and 12 assists in 68 appearances during the 2025–26 regular season, the first of his new contract, continuing his usage as a defensive forward in the team's bottom six. On May 14, he scored his second career playoff goal, and his first in five years, in a 6–3 victory over the Buffalo Sabres in the second round.

== International play ==
Medal record

Men's ice hockey

Representing Canada

Spengler Cup
Gold medal – first place	2017 Switzerland	

Internationally, Evans first represented Hockey Canada as part of team Canada East at both the 2013 and 2014 iterations of the World Junior A Challenge.

In December 2017, Evans was member of the Canadian national senior team that captured the Spengler Cup in Davos, Switzerland.

== Personal life ==
Evans was born in Toronto, Ontario, to parents Wayne and Marilyn. His mother is a family physician with a practice in Mississauga while his father is a salesman. He has an older brother, Matthew, who works in finance, and two cousins who played college ice hockey at Cornell University. As a child, Evans played piano and earned his Grade 7 Royal Conservatory certificate.

In June 2023, Evans got engaged to high school sweetheart Emily Flatley. They were married at the Luttrellstown Castle Resort located in Dublin, Ireland a year later. The couple welcomed twin boys in August 2025.

He is the son-in-law of Patrick Flatley who played a total of 14 NHL seasons most notably with the New York Islanders.

== Career statistics ==
			Regular season					Playoffs
Season	Team	League	GP	G	A	Pts	PIM	GP	G	A	Pts	PIM
2011–12	St. Michael's Buzzers	OJHL	5	2	2	4	0	—	—	—	—	—
2012–13	St. Michael's Buzzers	OJHL	50	12	32	44	45	24	8	9	17	14
2013–14	St. Michael's Buzzers	OJHL	49	16	47	63	79	5	0	5	5	8
2014–15	University of Notre Dame	HE	41	7	10	17	22	—	—	—	—	—
2015–16	University of Notre Dame	HE	37	8	25	33	29	—	—	—	—	—
2016–17	University of Notre Dame	HE	40	13	29	42	47	—	—	—	—	—
2017–18	University of Notre Dame	B1G	40	13	33	46	18	—	—	—	—	—
2018–19	Laval Rocket	AHL	67	13	32	45	26	—	—	—	—	—
2019–20	Laval Rocket	AHL	51	14	24	38	26	—	—	—	—	—
2019–20	Montreal Canadiens	NHL	13	2	1	3	0	6	0	1	1	0
2020–21	Montreal Canadiens	NHL	47	3	10	13	29	7	1	1	2	4
2021–22	Montreal Canadiens	NHL	72	13	16	29	22	—	—	—	—	—
2022–23	Montreal Canadiens	NHL	54	2	17	19	28	—	—	—	—	—
2023–24	Montreal Canadiens	NHL	82	7	21	28	24	—	—	—	—	—
2024–25	Montreal Canadiens	NHL	82	13	23	36	10	5	0	1	1	2
2025–26	Montreal Canadiens	NHL	68	12	12	24	28	19	2	8	10	22
NHL totals			418	52	100	152	141	37	3	11	14	28

=== International ===
Year	Team	Event	Result	GP	G	A	Pts	PIM
2012	Canada East	WJAC	4th	5	0	0	0	10
2013	Canada East	WJAC	6th	4	1	1	2	2
2017	Canada	SC	1st place, gold medalist(s)	4	0	0	0	0
Junior totals				9	1	1	2	12
Senior totals				4	0	0	0	0

== Awards and honours ==
Award	Year	Ref
GTHL
Top Prospects Game	2012	
OHL Cup	2012	
OJHL
Frank L. Buckland Trophy	2013	
First Team All-Prospect	2013, 2014	
OHA
Top Prospect Award	2014	
College
B1G First All-Star Team	2018	
