= Vinnie Hinostroza =

American ice hockey player (born 1994)

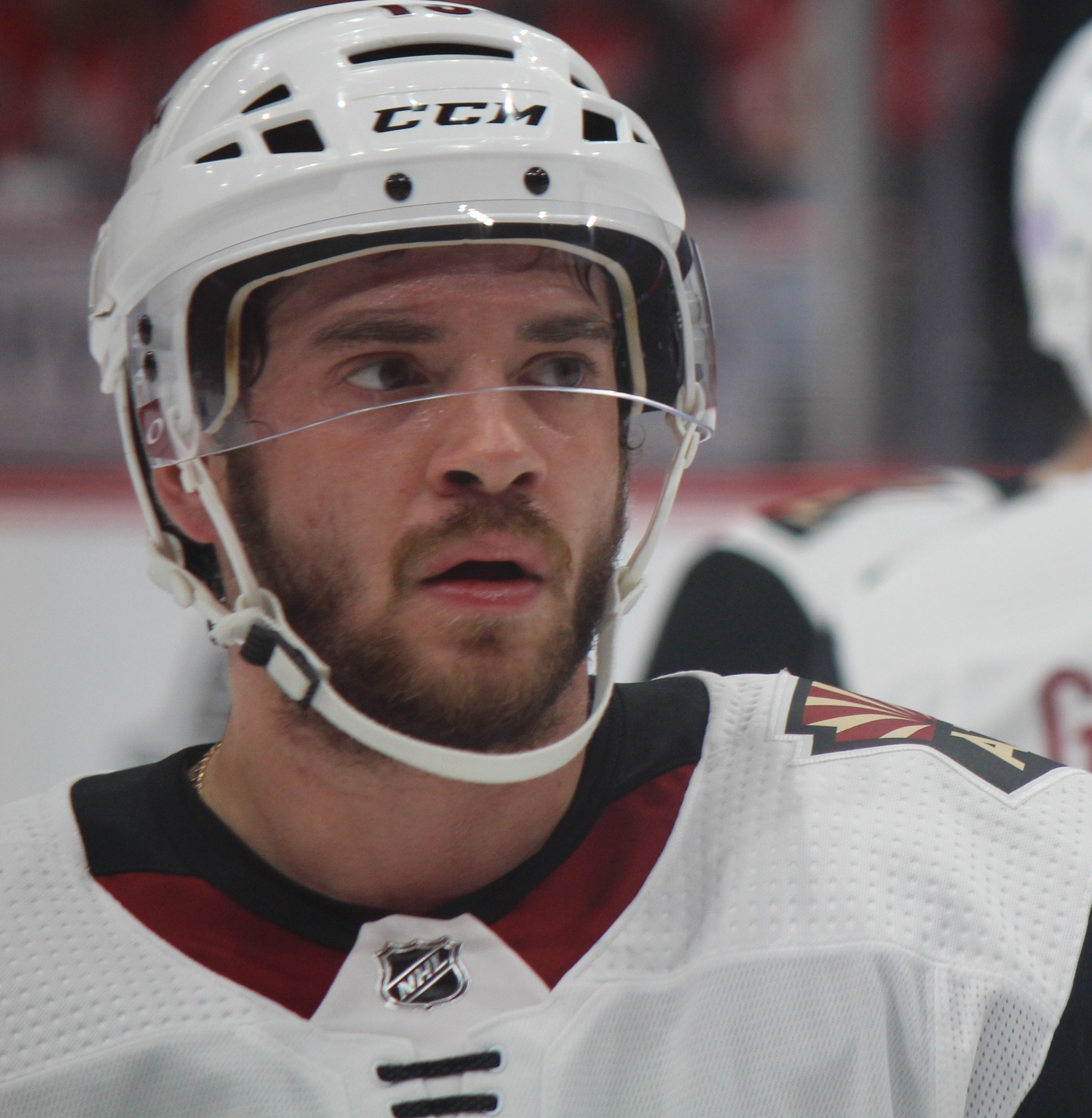
- Hinostroza with the Arizona Coyotes in 2019
- Born: April 3, 1994 (age 32) Melrose Park, Illinois, U.S.
- Height: 5 ft 10 in (178 cm)
- Weight: 183 lb (83 kg; 13 st 1 lb)
- Position: Forward
- Shoots: Right
- NHL team (P) Cur. team Former teams: Colorado Avalanche; Colorado Eagles (AHL); Chicago Blackhawks; Arizona Coyotes; Florida Panthers; Buffalo Sabres; Pittsburgh Penguins; Nashville Predators; Minnesota Wild
- National team: United States
- NHL draft: 169th overall, 2012; Chicago Blackhawks
- Playing career: 2015–present

Vincent Enrique Hinostroza (born April 3, 1994) is an American professional ice hockey player who is a forward for the Colorado Eagles of the American Hockey League (AHL) while under contract to the Colorado Avalanche of the National Hockey League (NHL). Hinostroza was selected by the Chicago Blackhawks in the sixth round (169th overall) of the 2012 NHL entry draft. He has previously played for the Blackhawks, Arizona Coyotes, Buffalo Sabres, Pittsburgh Penguins, Nashville Predators, Minnesota Wild and Florida Panthers.

== Playing career ==
Hinostroza played for the Chicago Mission AAA Youth Hockey Club (where his future NHL teammates Ryan Hartman and Nick Schmaltz also played). While playing for the Mission's U16 midget team, he played in 34 games where he scored 13 goals, had 21 assists and 38 penalty minutes. He attended USA Hockey's Central District U16 camp and was selected by the Waterloo Black Hawks in the first round (4th overall) in the 2010 USHL Futures Draft. Hinostroza would later commit to playing college hockey at the University of Notre Dame.

Hinostroza attended the University of Notre Dame where he skated two seasons with the Notre Dame Fighting Irish. In his freshman season, he was named to the 2013–14 Hockey East All-Rookie Team, and the following year, he was named to the 2014–15 Hockey East First All-Star Team. On March 21, 2015, Hinostroza signalled the end of his collegiate career after his junior season in signing a three-year entry-level contract with the Chicago Blackhawks.

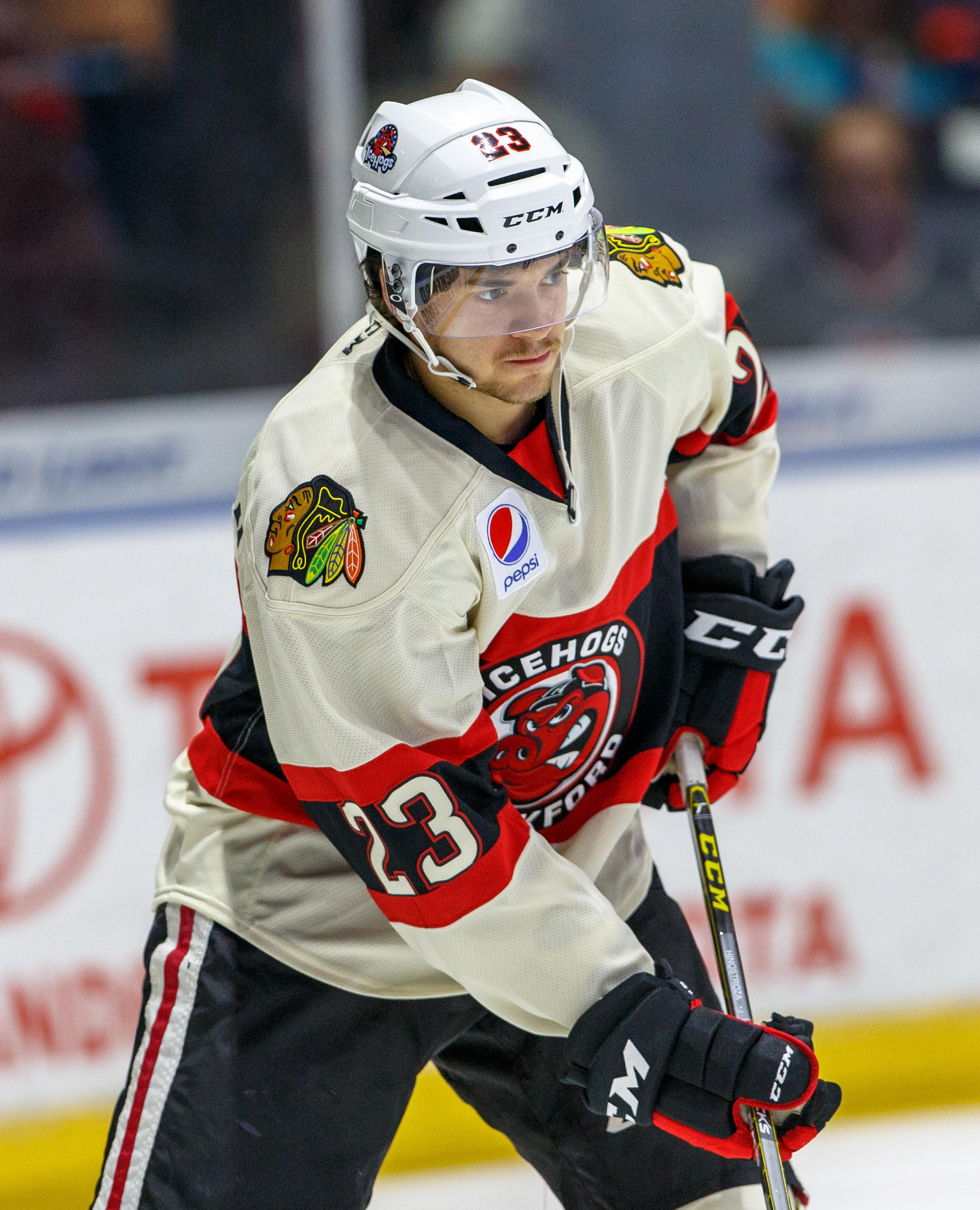
Hinostroza with the Rockford IceHogs in 2015

He was assigned to the Blackhawks American Hockey League (AHL) affiliate, the Rockford IceHogs to begin his professional rookie 2015–16 season. On October 16, 2015, he was recalled by the Blackhawks and on October 17, 2015, Hinostroza made his NHL debut, playing against the Columbus Blue Jackets. He recorded two penalty minutes and two shots on goal as Chicago won 4–1. Hinostroza scored his first career NHL goal against Jacob Markström of the Vancouver Canucks on November 19, 2016. He also recorded two assists in the same game which helped the Blackhawks rally from a 3–0 deficit and win in overtime. On June 15, 2018, Hinostroza agreed to a two-year contract with the Blackhawks, despite the possibility of becoming a free agent on July 1.

On July 12, 2018, Hinostroza was traded to the Arizona Coyotes along with Marián Hossa, Jordan Oesterle and a 2019 third-round pick, in exchange for Andrew Campbell, prospect MacKenzie Entwistle, Marcus Krüger, Jordan Maletta and a 2019 fifth-round draft pick. This trade cleared up $8.5 million cap space for the Blackhawks.

On October 8, 2020, as an impending restricted free agent, Hinostroza was not tendered a qualifying offer by the Coyotes, releasing him to free agency. On October 9, at the opening of the free agent Market, Hinostroza was signed to a one-year, $1 million contract with Florida Panthers.

On April 2, 2021, Hinostroza was traded back to the Blackhawks in exchange for Brad Morrison. After failing to record any points in nine games for Florida, Hinostroza tallied four goals and eight assists in 14 games with Chicago.

On July 28, 2021, Hinostroza signed a one-year, $1.05 million contract with the Buffalo Sabres. He skated in 62 games for the Sabres during the 2021–22 season, recording 13 goals and 12 assists for 25 points. Hinostroza split the 2022–23 season between the Sabres and their AHL affiliate, the Rochester Americans.

On July 7, 2023, Hinostroza signed a one-year, $775,000 contract with the Pittsburgh Penguins. In the 2023–24 season, Hinostroza primarily played with AHL affiliate, the Wilkes-Barre/Scranton Penguins, however was recalled on multiple occasions featuring in 14 appearances with Pittsburgh and collecting 1 goal and 3 points.

Leaving the Penguins at the conclusion of his contract, Hinostroza was signed to a two-year, two-way contract with the Nashville Predators on July 1, 2024. Assigned to the Milwaukee Admirals of the AHL to begin the 2024–25 season, Hinostroza led the league in scoring with 11 goals and 33 points before he was recalled by the Predators and made his debut with the club against the Winnipeg Jets on December 30, 2024. Hinostroza registered 2 assists through 13 appearances with the Predators before he was placed on waivers and subsequently claimed by the Minnesota Wild on February 5, 2025.

During the 2025–26 season, as a depth forward for the Wild, Hinostroza was unable to replicate his initial impact posting just 3 goals and 10 points through 48 appearances. On March 6, 2026, in a roster clearing move, Hinostroza was traded by the Wild to the Florida Panthers in exchange for future considerations. With the Panthers largely out of playoff contention, Hinostroza played out the remainder of his contract in a second stint with Florida, posting 8 points through 17 appearances.

As a free agent from the Panthers, Hinostroza continued his journeyman career in agreeing to a two-year, two-way contract with the Colorado Avalanche on July 1, 2026.

== Personal life ==
Hinostroza is the son of Rick and Laura Hinostroza and he grew up in Illinois with his older sister Carli. He attended high school at Bartlett High School where he played lacrosse. While playing junior hockey with the Waterloo Blackhawks, he attended Waterloo West High School in Waterloo, Iowa where he graduated in 2012. His paternal grandparents were from Ecuador.

== Career statistics ==
=== Regular season and playoffs ===
			Regular season					Playoffs
Season	Team	League	GP	G	A	Pts	PIM	GP	G	A	Pts	PIM
2010–11	Waterloo Black Hawks	USHL	50	8	14	22	36	—	—	—	—	—
2011–12	Waterloo Black Hawks	USHL	55	20	24	44	56	1	0	0	0	0
2012–13	Waterloo Black Hawks	USHL	46	25	35	60	14	5	4	3	7	8
2013–14	University of Notre Dame	HE	34	8	24	32	4	—	—	—	—	—
2014–15	University of Notre Dame	HE	42	11	33	44	48	—	—	—	—	—
2014–15	Rockford IceHogs	AHL	5	0	2	2	0	—	—	—	—	—
2015–16	Rockford IceHogs	AHL	66	18	33	51	24	3	0	0	0	2
2015–16	Chicago Blackhawks	NHL	7	0	0	0	6	—	—	—	—	—
2016–17	Chicago Blackhawks	NHL	49	6	8	14	17	1	0	0	0	0
2016–17	Rockford IceHogs	AHL	15	3	4	7	4	—	—	—	—	—
2017–18	Rockford IceHogs	AHL	23	9	13	22	8	—	—	—	—	—
2017–18	Chicago Blackhawks	NHL	50	7	18	25	10	—	—	—	—	—
2018–19	Arizona Coyotes	NHL	72	16	23	39	14	—	—	—	—	—
2019–20	Arizona Coyotes	NHL	68	5	17	22	14	7	0	2	2	2
2020–21	Florida Panthers	NHL	9	0	0	0	0	—	—	—	—	—
2020–21	Chicago Blackhawks	NHL	17	4	8	12	8	—	—	—	—	—
2021–22	Buffalo Sabres	NHL	62	13	12	25	24	—	—	—	—	—
2022–23	Buffalo Sabres	NHL	26	2	9	11	6	—	—	—	—	—
2022–23	Rochester Americans	AHL	11	5	4	9	6	—	—	—	—	—
2023–24	Wilkes-Barre/Scranton Penguins	AHL	42	16	19	35	32	2	0	3	3	4
2023–24	Pittsburgh Penguins	NHL	14	1	2	3	4	—	—	—	—	—
2024–25	Milwaukee Admirals	AHL	26	11	22	33	14	—	—	—	—	—
2024–25	Nashville Predators	NHL	13	0	2	2	6	—	—	—	—	—
2024–25	Minnesota Wild	NHL	25	5	3	8	4	1	0	0	0	2
2025–26	Minnesota Wild	NHL	48	3	7	10	15	—	—	—	—	—
2025–26	Florida Panthers	NHL	17	3	5	8	16	—	—	—	—	—
NHL totals			477	65	114	179	144	9	0	2	2	4

=== International ===
Year	Team	Event	Result	GP	G	A	Pts	PIM
2011	United States	IH18	5th	4	2	2	4	2
2014	United States	WJC	5th	5	3	2	5	0
2016	United States	WC	4th	9	1	2	3	10
Junior totals				9	5	4	9	2
Senior totals				9	1	2	3	10

== Awards and honors ==
Award	Year
International
World Junior A Challenge Most Valuable Player	2012
College
Hockey East All-Rookie Team	2013–14
Hockey East First Team All-Star	2014–15
