= C. J. Suess =

American ice hockey player (born 1994)

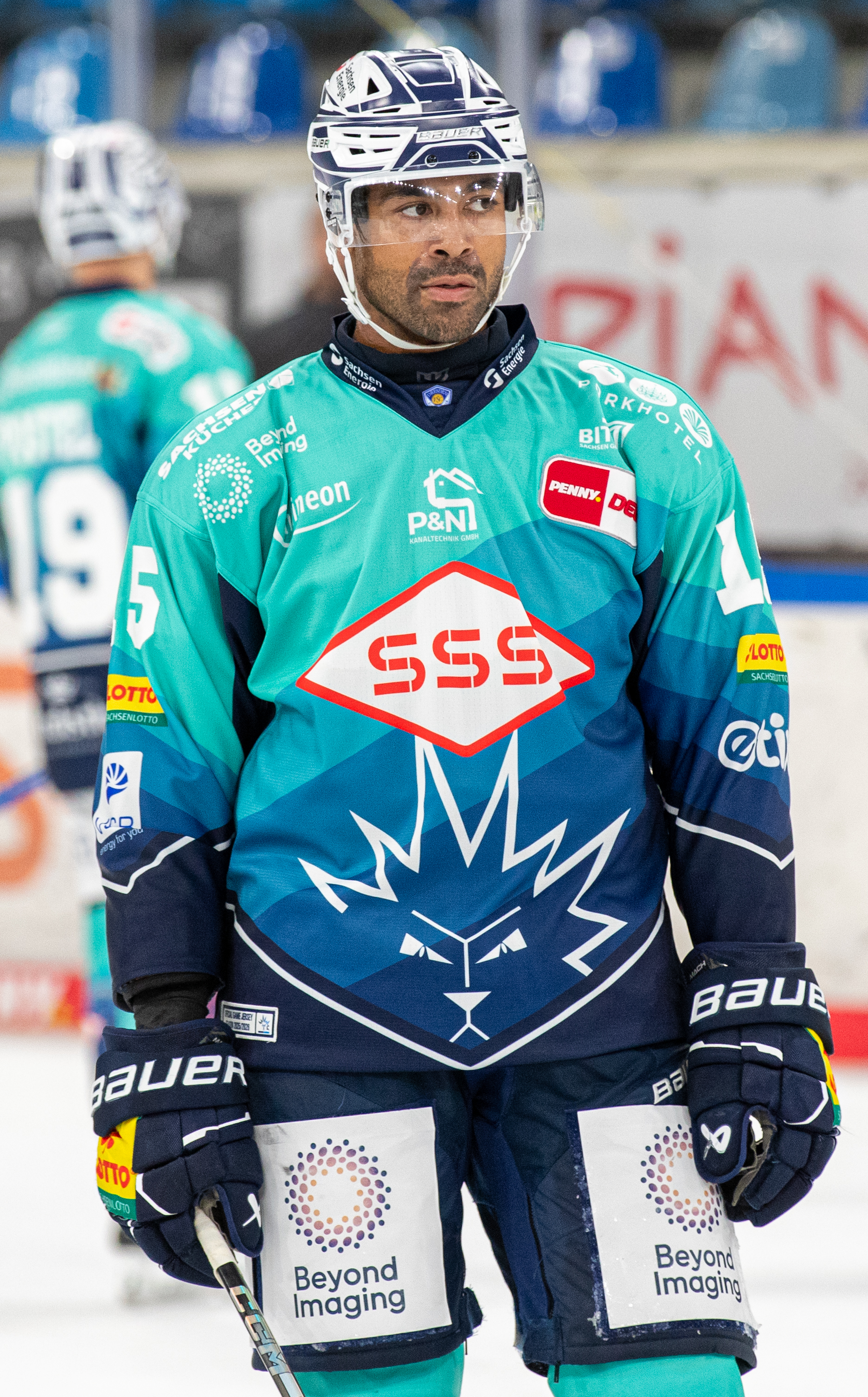
- Suess in 2025
- Born: March 17, 1994 (age 32) Roseville, Minnesota, U.S.
- Height: 5 ft 11 in (180 cm)
- Weight: 190 lb (86 kg; 13 st 8 lb)
- Position: Left wing
- Shoots: Left
- DEL team Former teams: Dresdner Eislöwen; Winnipeg Jets; San Jose Sharks
- NHL draft: 129th overall, 2014; Winnipeg Jets
- Playing career: 2018–present

Clinston Joseph Robert "C.J." Suess (/siːs/; né Franklin; March 17, 1994) is an American professional ice hockey player who is a forward for Dresdner Eislöwen in the Deutsche Eishockey Liga (DEL). Prior to playing professionally, Suess played college hockey for the Minnesota State Mavericks at Minnesota State University, Mankato. At the time of his graduation, his 127 career points were tied for fifth on the school's career scoring list during the NCAA Division I era. He also represented Team USA in the 2013 World Junior A Challenge, helping them win a gold medal.

== Early life ==
Suess was born "Clinston R. Franklin" to mother Cheryl Suess on March 17, 1994, in Roseville, Minnesota. He began skating at the age four in White Bear Lake, Minnesota with his cousins before his family moved to Forest Lake, Minnesota. His mother was his primary caregiver and he considers both her and his grandmother the "two people that have meant more to him than anyone else in the world." As a person of color himself, Suess admired hockey player Jarome Iginla as a successful black athlete.

== Playing career ==
=== Amateur ===
Suess attended Forest Lake Area High School where he played ice hockey under the tutelage of former Minnesota State defenseman Aaron Forsythe. During his high school hockey career, he was a three-time letter winner, two-time Suburban East All-Conference selection, and served as a team captain during his junior and senior seasons. In his sophomore season, Suess scored 19 goals and 21 assists in 27 games, ranking as the second-leading scorer on the team. With his assistance, the team finished second to Cretin-Derham Hall High School in the Suburban East Conference and defeated Grand Rapids before falling to Elk River in the Section 7AA semi-finals.

While playing for the men's ice hockey team, Suess also competed on their baseball team. He helped them qualify for the 2010 state tournament but broke his ankle during his junior year. In June 2012, Suess attended the tryout camp for the Sioux Falls Stampede of the United States Hockey League (USHL). After qualifying for the team, he led the Stampede with 32 goals and 28 assists in 63 regular season games. During his second (and final) season with the Stampede, Suess was selected to serve as an alternate captain with Team USA at the 2013 World Junior A Challenge, helping them win a gold medal. Upon returning from the tournament, Suess signed a Letter of Intent to attend Minnesota State University, Mankato, an NCAA Division I school. By mid-season, he had recorded 16 goals and 25 assists in 41 games and was selected for the USHL Western Conference All-Star Second Team. With his help, the Stampede finished fourth in the Western Conference and qualified for the USHL playoffs before being swept by the Waterloo Black Hawks. Prior to joining the Minnesota State Mavericks, Suess was drafted 129th overall by the Winnipeg Jets in the 2014 National Hockey League Entry Draft.

=== Collegiate ===
Suess played college hockey for the Minnesota State Mavericks at Minnesota State University, Mankato from 2014 until 2018. In his rookie season, Suess recorded 9 goals and 19 assists for 28 points, which tied for sixth amongst team scoring leaders. He recorded his first collegiate goal on October 16 in a 5–4 overtime win over the Minnesota Duluth Bulldogs. Suess played the majority of the season on the top line with juniors Teodors Bļugers and Bryce Gervais. He later recorded the game-winning goal in the team's North Star College Cup 4–5 overtime win over the Minnesota Golden Gophers. At the conclusion of the season, Suess was selected for the 2014–15 Western Collegiate Hockey Association (WCHA) All-Rookie Team.

During his sophomore season, Suess switched from left wing, a position he had spent his entire hockey career playing, to center due to a slow start. When speaking of his decision, he said: "I think I switched mainly so I could get speed coming through the zone and attacking from the middle...I did go through a slump earlier this year but then we made the switch and it's helped a lot I think." After making the change, Suess finished third on the season in scoring and second in goals with 14. At the conclusion of the season, he attended the Winnipeg Jets' NHL Developmental Camp.

Prior to his junior year, Suess was named co-captain of the Mavericks alongside senior defenseman Carter Foguth and alternate captains Michael Huntebrinker, Sean Flanagan, and Brad McClure. During the season, he was named the WCHA Offensive Player of the Week after the team's 5–3 win over the Bowling Green Falcons. He tied for second on the team in points and finished fourth in goals scored. In the off-season, he was again invited to participate at the Winnipeg Jets' NHL Developmental Camp.

Suess, Brad McClure, and Max Coatta were named captains of the Mavericks prior to Suess's senior year. In December, Suess officially changed his last name from Franklin to Suess in honor of his mother. At the conclusion of his senior year, Suess was named to the WCHA First All-Star Team and was named the WCHA Player of the Year, becoming the first Maverick to capture the award. Suess was also the recipient of the WCHA Offensive Player of the Year and selected for the WCHA All-American First Team.

Suess officially concluded his collegiate career on March 25, 2018, by signing an amateur tryout agreement with the Manitoba Moose, the American Hockey League affiliate of the Winnipeg Jets. At the time of his graduation, his 127 career points were tied for fifth on the school's career scoring list during its time at the NCAA Division I level.

=== Professional ===
After attending the Winnipeg Jets' training camp prior to the 2018–19 season, Suess was reassigned to the Manitoba Moose to begin the year. He played 26 games for the team, recording 12 points before suffering a season-ending upper body injury in mid-December. In spite of this, he was re-signed by the Jets to a one-year, two-way contract with an average annual value of $700,000 if he played in the NHL.

Upon being medically cleared to play, Suess participated in the Jets' 2019 training camp but was again reassigned to the Moose. As a result of injuries, Suess made his National Hockey League debut with the Winnipeg Jets on November 11, 2019, against the San Jose Sharks, playing a total of 6:26 on the ice. He was returned to the Moose for the remainder of the season and finished with 27 points in 57 games. On October 10, 2020, Suess signed a two-year, two way contract extension with an average annual value of $725,000 to remain with the Jets organization. When the NHL returned for the 2020–21 season due to COVID-19, he was reassigned to the Moose.

On July 13, 2022, he signed as a free agent to a one-year, two-way contract with the San Jose Sharks.

Following one season in the Sharks organization, Suess left the club as a free agent and opted to return to the Manitoba Moose of the AHL after agreeing to a two-year contract on July 10, 2023.

On July 30, 2025, Suess opted to sign his first contract abroad, agreeing to a one-year contract with newly promoted German club, Dresdner Eislöwen of the DEL, for the 2025–26 season.

== Career statistics ==
=== Regular season and playoffs ===
			Regular season					Playoffs
Season	Team	League	GP	G	A	Pts	PIM	GP	G	A	Pts	PIM
2009–10	Forest Lake High School	USHS	25	18	19	37	18	2	1	2	3	0
2010–11	Forest Lake High School	USHS	25	23	10	33	22	1	0	0	0	0
2011–12	Forest Lake High School	USHS	25	15	23	38	26	2	0	4	4	2
2012–13	Sioux Falls Stampede	USHL	63	32	28	60	60	10	1	3	4	7
2013–14	Sioux Falls Stampede	USHL	53	22	29	51	43	3	2	1	3	4
2014–15	Minnesota State	WCHA	37	9	19	28	21	—	—	—	—	—
2015–16	Minnesota State	WCHA	41	14	11	25	43	—	—	—	—	—
2016–17	Minnesota State	WCHA	39	12	19	31	38	—	—	—	—	—
2017–18	Minnesota State	WCHA	40	22	21	43	53	—	—	—	—	—
2017–18	Manitoba Moose	AHL	6	1	1	2	2	3	0	1	1	0
2018–19	Manitoba Moose	AHL	26	8	4	12	6	—	—	—	—	—
2019–20	Manitoba Moose	AHL	57	14	13	27	33	—	—	—	—	—
2019–20	Winnipeg Jets	NHL	1	0	0	0	0	—	—	—	—	—
2020–21	Manitoba Moose	AHL	31	8	6	14	10	—	—	—	—	—
2021–22	Manitoba Moose	AHL	46	14	14	28	16	5	1	1	2	4
2021–22	Winnipeg Jets	NHL	3	0	0	0	2	—	—	—	—	—
2022–23	San Jose Barracuda	AHL	46	10	12	22	43	—	—	—	—	—
2022–23	San Jose Sharks	NHL	1	0	0	0	2	—	—	—	—	—
2023–24	Manitoba Moose	AHL	68	10	10	20	26	2	0	0	0	0
2024–25	Manitoba Moose	AHL	71	11	12	23	32	—	—	—	—	—
NHL totals			5	0	0	0	4	—	—	—	—	—

=== International ===
Year	Team	Event	GP	G	A	Pts	PIM
2014	United States	WJAC	4	2	1	3	6
Junior totals			4	2	1	3	6

== Awards and honors ==
Award	Year	Ref
USHL
All-Star Game	2014	
College
WCHA All-Rookie Team	2015	
WCHA Second All-Star Team	2017	
WCHA First All-Star Team	2018	
WCHA Offensive Player of the Year	2018	
WCHA Player of the Year	2018	
West First All-American Team	2018	
Hobey Baker Award Finalist	2018	

Awards and achievements
Preceded by Michael Bitzer	WCHA Player of the Year; 2017–18	Succeeded by Troy Loggins
