= Justin Danforth =

Canadian ice hockey player (born 1993)

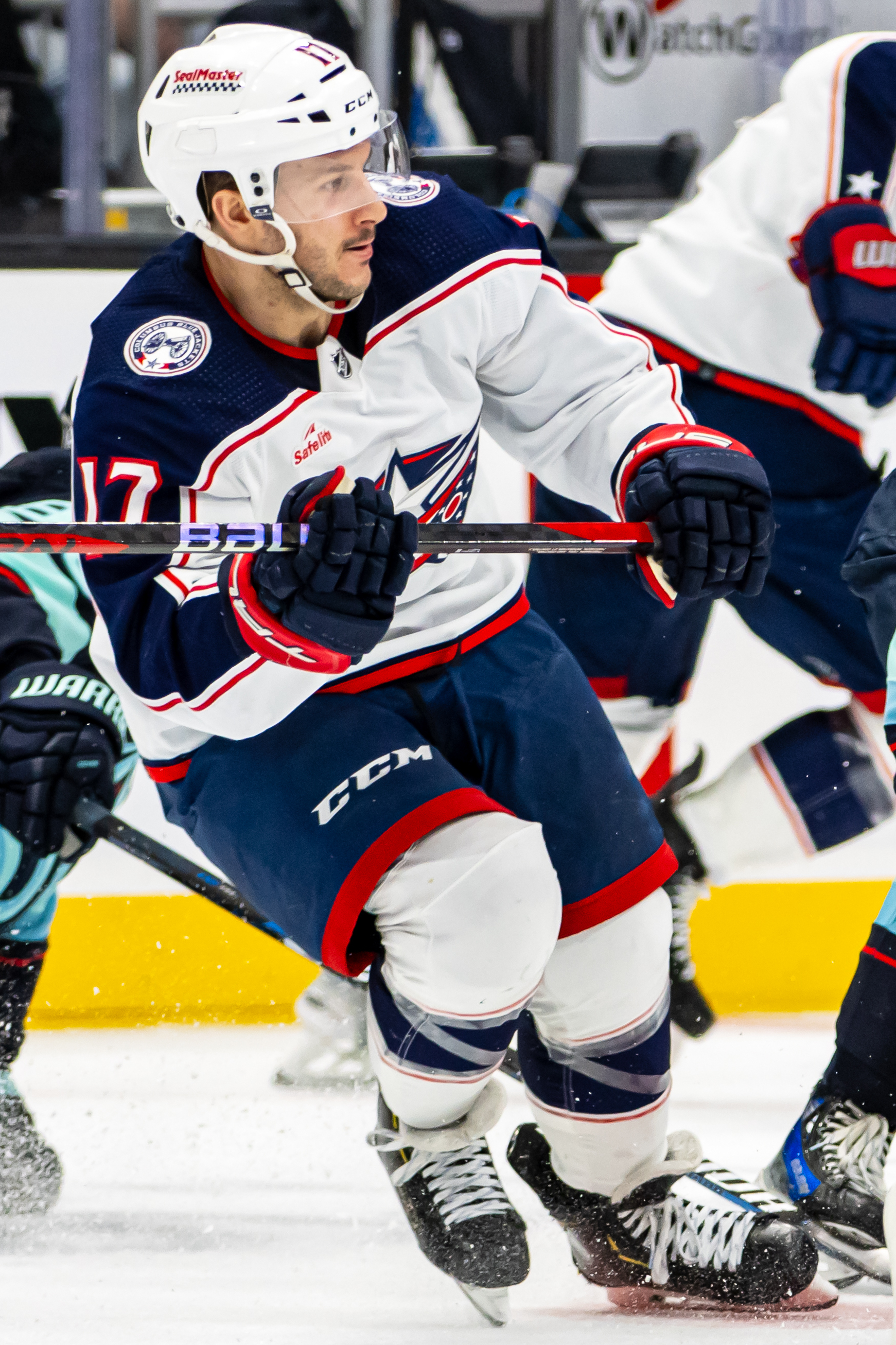
- Danforth with the Columbus Blue Jackets in 2024
- Born: March 15, 1993 (age 33) Oshawa, Ontario, Canada
- Height: 5 ft 9 in (175 cm)
- Weight: 181 lb (82 kg; 12 st 13 lb)
- Position: Forward
- Shoots: Right
- NHL team Former teams: Buffalo Sabres; Lukko; HC Vityaz; Columbus Blue Jackets
- National team: Canada
- NHL draft: Undrafted
- Playing career: 2017–present

Justin Danforth (born March 15, 1993) is a Canadian professional ice hockey player who is a forward for the Buffalo Sabres of the National Hockey League (NHL). He won the ECHL Rookie of the Year in 2018 with the Cincinnati Cyclones.

Prior to turning professional, Danforth played four years at Sacred Heart University where he was honoured as AHA Rookie of the Year and selected for the AHA First All-Star Team, AHA Second All-Conference Team, and AHA All-Rookie Team.

Internationally, he has represented Canada at the 2011 and 2012 World Junior A Challenge and at the 2021 IIHF World Championship, where he won gold.

== Playing career ==
=== Amateur ===
Danforth began skating at the age of four and played hockey around his hometown through the Oshawa Minor Hockey Association and later the Ontario Junior Hockey League (OJHL). Standing at 5 foot 8 as a youth, Danforth stated he was constantly told he was too short to play hockey, although this did not deter him. Before joining the OJHL, Danforth played for the Oshawa Minor Generals in the Oshawa Minor Hockey Association.

After finishing his Midget AAA years with the Oshawa Minor Generals, Danforth played in the OJHL with the Cobourg Cougars starting in the 2009–10 season. In 2012, Danforth participated in the Central Canada Cup where he led the OJHL East Division All-Star Team to a tournament title and was subsequently named tournament MVP. He was named to the OJHL Second All-Star Team at the conclusion of the 2013–14 season.

On June 3, 2013, Danforth committed to play NCAA Division 1 ice hockey for Sacred Heart University while studying sports management. He stated that playing in the OJHL with the Cougars was critical to him earning an NCAA scholarship.

=== Collegiate ===
Danforth began his rookie season at Sacred Heart during the 2013–14 season. He played in 36 games and led the team with 29 total points during the season. He recorded his first two collegiate points on October 16 in a 3–1 win over Bentley University. He helped the team qualify for the 2014 Atlantic Hockey Tournament where they lost in the first round to Canisius College. At the conclusion of the season, Danforth was named to the AHA All-Rookie Team and AHA Rookie of the Year.

In his sophomore year, Danforth played in 38 games and recorded 22 points. He helped Sacred Heart qualify for the 2015 Atlantic Hockey Tournament where they lost in the Quarterfinals to Canisius. He was named to the 2014–15 Atlantic Hockey All-Academic Team for having a 3.0 grade point average or higher while competing.

In his junior season, Danforth picked up productivity and recorded 41 points in 36 games which set a new career high. He recorded his first collegiate hat trick in a 6–4 win over the Mercyhurst Lakers on January 16, 2016, and was subsequently named Atlantic Hockey Player of the Month for January after tying for third in the nation in points. He ended the season being selected for the Atlantic Hockey All-Conference Second Team and the Atlantic Hockey All-Academic Team.

In June 2016, Danforth was invited to the Florida Panthers development camp which ran from June 11–15. He returned to the Pioneers for his senior year where he was named an assistant captain and led the team with 32 points. He recorded his 100th collegiate point on November 22, 2016, becoming the 13th Pioneer player to reach that milestone and concluded the season being named to the Atlantic Hockey All-Conference First Team.

=== Professional ===
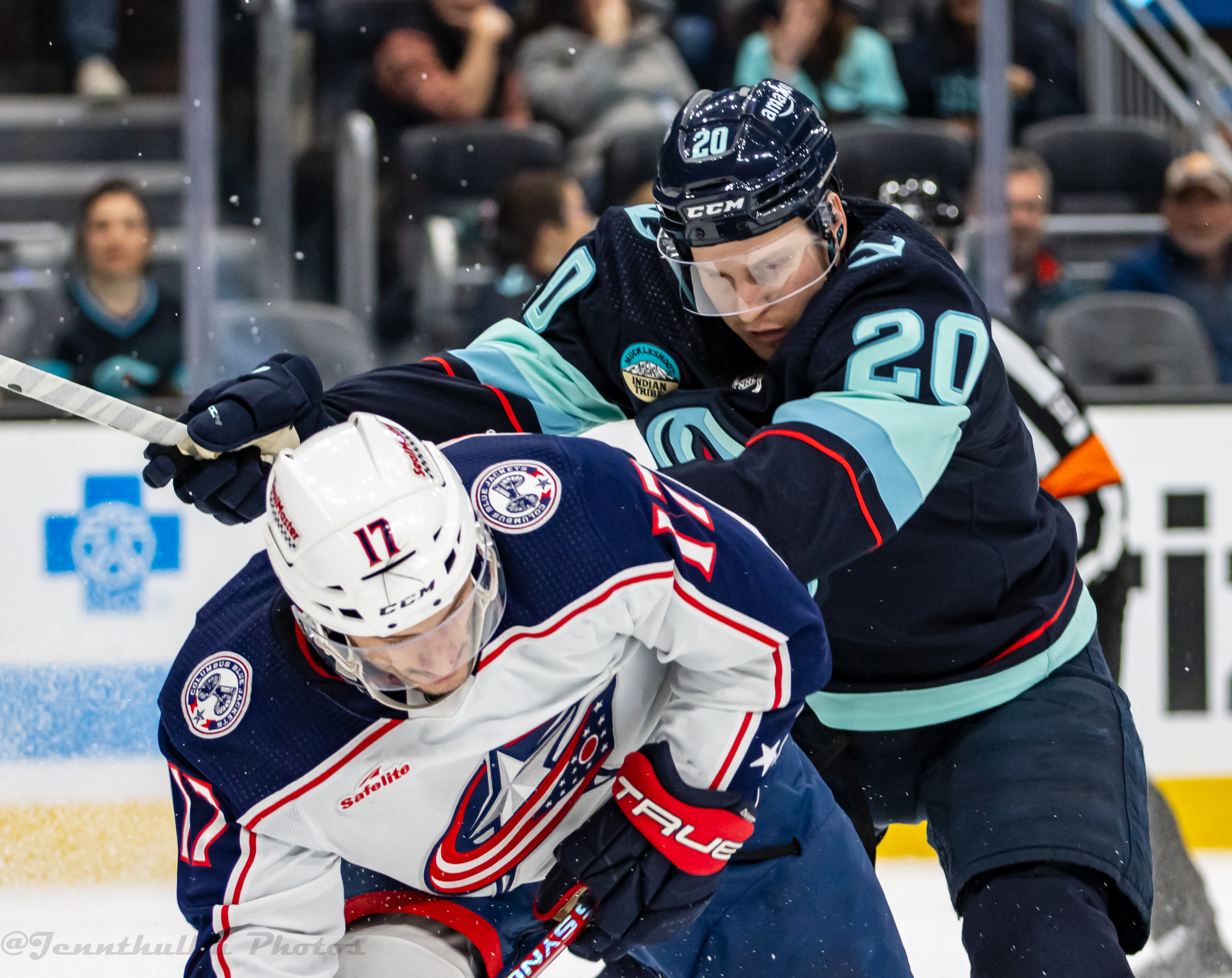
Danforth with the Blue Jackets being checked by Eeli Tolvanen of the Seattle Kraken in 2024.

After graduating, Danforth signed an amateur tryout agreement with the Reading Royals of the ECHL. However, after three games with the Royals, Danforth signed another amateur tryout with the Bridgeport Sound Tigers of the American Hockey League (AHL). A few days later, Danforth signed another amateur tryout with an AHL team, the Rochester Americans. His amateur tryout converted into an AHL contract for the 2017–18 season on April 22, 2017.

Danforth spent the 2017–18 season moving between the AHL and ECHL. He was named to Team Central at the ECHL All-Star Game after leading all rookies with 37 points. He was also named to the ECHL All-Rookie Team, All-ECHL Second Team and eventually ECHL Rookie of the Year at the conclusion of the season. Despite him spending almost two months in the AHL, he still ranked third amongst all ECHL rookies with 59 points.

On May 8, 2018, Danforth left North America and joined Lukko of the Finnish Liiga. He signed a contract extension with the team on February 27, 2019. Prior to the 2019–20 season, he was named an alternate captain. In the 2019–20 season, Danforth's 27 goals scored were second in Liiga, behind just Julius Nättinen.

As a free agent, Danforth left Finland for Russia, agreeing to a one-year contract with HC Vityaz of the Kontinental Hockey League (KHL), on May 2, 2020. In the 2020–21 season, Danforth posted 23 goals and 32 assists for 55 points in 58 games to lead the club in scoring and placed sixth league wide.

Following three standout seasons abroad, Danforth returned to North America and was signed to his first NHL contract in signing a one-year contract with the Columbus Blue Jackets on May 3, 2021. On November 15, 2021, Danforth made his NHL debut in 5–3 win over the Detroit Red Wings. He is the first NHL player from Sacred Heart University. Danforth scored his first NHL goal on November 19, 2021, in Columbus' 5–4 win over the Arizona Coyotes.

Leaving the Blue Jackets as a free agent following a four-year tenure, Danforth was signed to a two-year, $3.6 million contract with the Buffalo Sabres on July 1, 2025.

== International play ==
Medal record

Representing Canada

Ice hockey

World Championships
Gold medal – first place	2021 Latvia	

In November 2011, Danforth was selected to Team Canada East at the 2011 World Junior A Challenge where he helped the team win a silver medal. He was again selected the following year for the 2012 World Junior A Challenge, where the team placed fourth in the tournament. He won gold with Canada at the 2021 IIHF World Championship.

== Personal life ==
Danforth's father Kent played lacrosse as a youth and Danforth followed in his footsteps until the age of 15. His older brother Brandon also played hockey and lacrosse growing up.

== Career statistics ==
=== Regular season and playoffs ===
			Regular season					Playoffs
Season	Team	League	GP	G	A	Pts	PIM	GP	G	A	Pts	PIM
2009–10	Oshawa Generals AAA	ETA U18	—	—	—	—	—	—	—	—	—	—
2009–10	Cobourg Cougars	OJHL	3	0	0	0	2	—	—	—	—	—
2010–11	Cobourg Cougars	OJHL	47	13	23	36	26	10	2	1	3	3
2011–12	Cobourg Cougars	OJHL	41	22	27	49	40	5	2	3	5	4
2012–13	Cobourg Cougars	OJHL	43	22	34	56	42	9	3	11	14	8
2013–14	Sacred Heart University	AHA	36	5	24	29	24	—	—	—	—	—
2014–15	Sacred Heart University	AHA	38	7	15	22	26	—	—	—	—	—
2015–16	Sacred Heart University	AHA	36	20	21	41	22	—	—	—	—	—
2016–17	Sacred Heart University	AHA	37	10	22	32	53	—	—	—	—	—
2016–17	Reading Royals	ECHL	3	1	2	3	2	—	—	—	—	—
2016–17	Bridgeport Sound Tigers	AHL	1	0	0	0	0	—	—	—	—	—
2016–17	Rochester Americans	AHL	5	2	0	2	4	—	—	—	—	—
2017–18	Rochester Americans	AHL	15	2	3	5	12	—	—	—	—	—
2017–18	Cincinnati Cyclones	ECHL	44	28	31	59	40	2	0	0	0	2
2018–19	Lukko	Liiga	59	18	34	52	73	7	2	2	4	0
2019–20	Lukko	Liiga	56	27	33	60	26	—	—	—	—	—
2020–21	HC Vityaz	KHL	58	23	32	55	50	—	—	—	—	—
2021–22	Cleveland Monsters	AHL	8	2	3	5	0	—	—	—	—	—
2021–22	Columbus Blue Jackets	NHL	45	10	4	14	10	—	—	—	—	—
2022–23	Columbus Blue Jackets	NHL	6	2	1	3	4	—	—	—	—	—
2023–24	Columbus Blue Jackets	NHL	71	10	16	26	26	—	—	—	—	—
2024–25	Columbus Blue Jackets	NHL	61	9	12	21	18	—	—	—	—	—
2025–26	Buffalo Sabres	NHL	4	0	0	0	2	—	—	—	—	—
Liiga totals			115	45	67	112	99	7	2	2	4	0
KHL totals			58	23	32	55	50	—	—	—	—	—
NHL totals			187	31	33	64	60	—	—	—	—	—

=== International ===
Year	Team	Event	Result	GP	G	A	Pts	PIM
2011	Canada East	WJAC	2nd place, silver medalist(s)	4	1	0	1	4
2012	Canada East	WJAC	4th	5	1	0	1	18
2021	Canada	WC	1st place, gold medalist(s)	9	1	0	1	12
Junior totals				9	2	0	2	22
Senior totals				9	1	0	1	12

== Awards and honours ==
Award	Year	Ref
OJHL
Central Canada Cup All-Star Challenge MVP	2012	
OJHL Second All-Star Team	2013	
College
AHA All-Rookie Team	2014	
NCAA (AHA) Rookie of the Year	2014	
AHA Second All-Conference Team	2016	
AHA First All-Star Team	2017	
ECHL
ECHL All-Rookie Team	2018	
ECHL Rookie of the Year	2018	
ECHL Second All-Star Team	2018	
ECHL All-Star Game	2018	
