= Ryan Hartman =

American ice hockey player (born 1994)

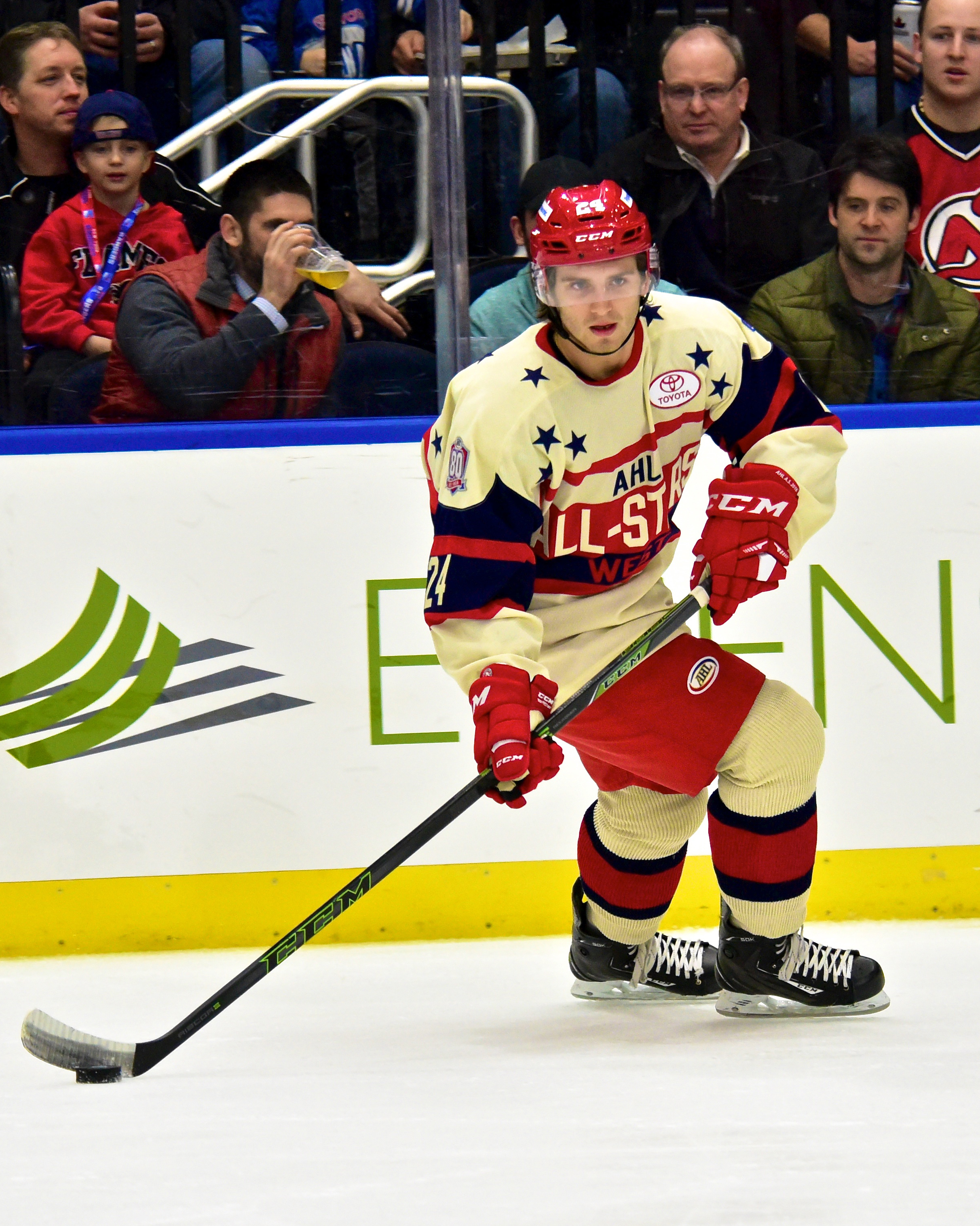
- Hartman at the 2016 AHL All-Star Game
- Born: September 20, 1994 (age 32) Hilton Head Island, South Carolina, U.S.
- Height: 6 ft 0 in (183 cm)
- Weight: 197 lb (89 kg; 14 st 1 lb)
- Position: Forward
- Shoots: Right
- NHL team Former teams: Minnesota Wild; Chicago Blackhawks; Nashville Predators; Philadelphia Flyers
- National team: United States
- NHL draft: 30th overall, 2013; Chicago Blackhawks
- Playing career: 2014–present

Ryan Keyes Hartman (born September 20, 1994) is an American professional ice hockey player who is a forward for the Minnesota Wild of the National Hockey League (NHL). Hartman was selected by the Chicago Blackhawks in the first round (30th overall) of the 2013 NHL entry draft. He made his NHL debut in 2015 for the Blackhawks. He is the first player in NHL history to be born in the state of South Carolina.

== Early life ==
Hartman was born on September 20, 1994, on Hilton Head Island, South Carolina. He was raised by Craig and Kim Hartman in West Dundee, Illinois, where he became a fan of the Chicago Blackhawks of the National Hockey League (NHL). He attended William Fremd High School in Palatine, Illinois, another suburb of Chicago. He began ice skating at the age of three and played minor ice hockey with a number of Chicago-area teams, most notably the Chicago Mission, with whom he won several state championships. With the Mission, Hartman became friends with fellow future NHL players Nick Schmaltz and Vinnie Hinostroza.

When he was 15, Hartman joined the USA Hockey National Team Development Program (NTDP), and his family moved to Ann Arbor, Michigan. His father built an ice skating rink in the backyard of their Michigan house, and Hartman used the rink to develop his shooting technique. During the 2011–12 NTDP season, Hartman was second on the team with 38 points in 55 games.

== Playing career ==
=== Junior ===
As a 17-year-old, preparing for the 2012–13 season, Hartman originally committed to playing college hockey for the Miami RedHawks in NCAA Division I, but later de-committed from the school to play for the Plymouth Whalers of the Ontario Hockey League.

Hartman joined the Whalers for the 2012–13 OHL season and was invited to take part in the CHL Top Prospects Game. He was then selected to play with the gold-medal-winning American squad at the IIHF World U20 Championship. Hartman was rated as a top prospect, fulfilling the expectation to be a first-round selection at the 2013 NHL entry draft.

=== Professional ===
==== Chicago Blackhawks ====
On November 18, 2013, the Chicago Blackhawks signed Hartman to a three-year entry-level contract.

Hartman made his NHL debut on February 13, 2015, against the New Jersey Devils.

Hartman started the 2016–17 NHL season with the Blackhawks. The team sought to harness Hartman's physical play style after trading away Andrew Shaw in the offseason. He scored the first goal of his career against Jake Allen of the St. Louis Blues during the NHL's season opener on October 12, 2016. Hartman scored his first career hat trick against the Nashville Predators on January 8, 2017. Hartman finished the season with 19 goals and 12 assists.

During the 2017–18 season, Hartman recorded eight goals and 17 assists in 57 appearances for the Blackhawks. He rotated through the Blackhawks lineup, but primarily skated as a bottom-six forward.

==== Nashville Predators ====
On February 26, 2018, Hartman along with a fifth-round pick in 2018 NHL entry draft was traded to the Nashville Predators in exchange for Victor Ejdsell, first-round and fourth-round picks in 2018. He appeared in 21 regular season games for Nashville, where he tallied three goals and three assists. The NHL suspended Hartman for one game during the first round of the 2018 Stanley Cup playoffs after he delivered an illegal check to Carl Soderberg.

==== Philadelphia Flyers ====
In the 2018–19 season, at the NHL trade deadline on February 25, 2019, the Predators traded Hartman, along with a conditional fourth-round pick in 2020, to the Philadelphia Flyers in exchange for Wayne Simmonds. He added two goals and six points through 19 games with the Flyers as the club missed the playoffs.

==== Minnesota Wild ====
On June 24, 2019, Hartman was again involved in a trade, dealt by the Flyers to the Dallas Stars in exchange for Tyler Pitlick. The following day, Hartman was not tendered a qualifying offer from the Stars, enabling him to become a free agent on July 1.

On the opening day of free agency, Hartman was signed to a two-year, $3.8 million contract with the Minnesota Wild on July 1, 2019.

On April 22, 2021, Hartman signed a three-year, $5.1 million contract extension with the Wild.

On October 7, 2023, Hartman signed a three-year, $12 million contract extension with the Wild.

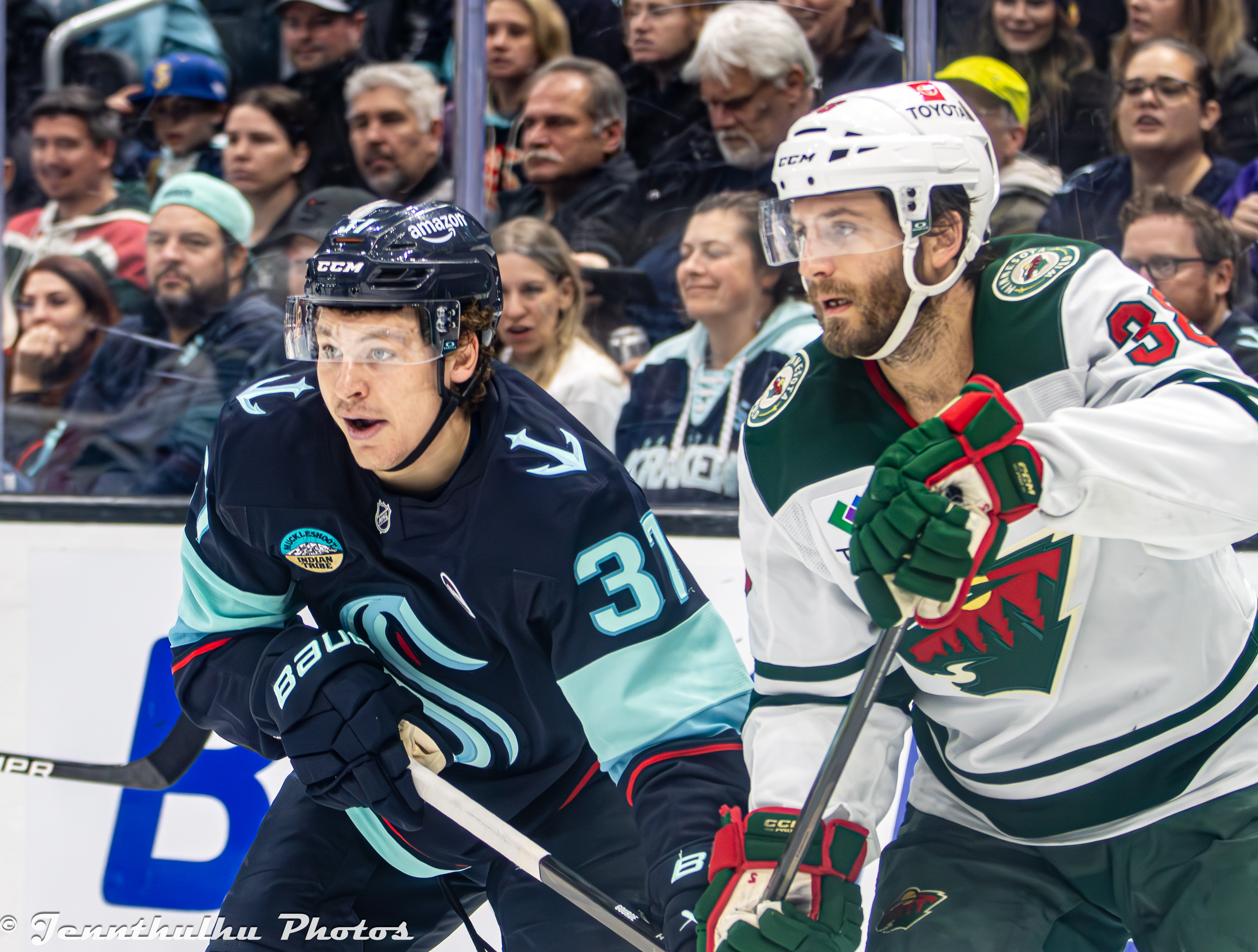
Hartman during his tenure with the Wild.

Hartman sparked controversy in late December 2023 after being accused of intentionally attempting to injure a player in a back-to-back series against the Winnipeg Jets. On December 30, Wild star Kirill Kaprizov was injured from a pair of cross-checks from Jets defenceman Brenden Dillon. The next night, 1:51 into the first period of a rematch against the Jets, Jets forward Cole Perfetti claims that Hartman told Perfetti that he was going to intentionally high-stick him as retribution for Kaprizov's injury, despite Perfetti not being involved in the play which injured Kaprizov. On the ensuing faceoff, Hartman hit Perfetti in the face with a high-stick. Although the play was not called a penalty by the referees, Perfertti was wearing a microphone when the exchange occurred which picked up audio of the interaction. Perfetti was not injured on the play but required stiches from the high-stick. On January 2, 2024, the NHL fined Hartman $4,427.08 for high-sticking Perfetti, the maximum allowable under the league's collective bargaining agreement for an infraction which does not involve an injury or game misconduct penalty resulting from a play. After three days of silence following the breaking of the story, Hartman publicly denied that he had intentionally high-sticked Perfetti and instead claimed that Perfetti had baited Hartman into claiming responsibility for the incident during the match; audio of the exchange was not released after the Wild organization and National Hockey League Players' Association objected to its release. Later in the season, Hartman received a 3-game suspension on April 1, 2024 for unsportsmanlike conduct after throwing his stick on the ice from the bench while berating the referees; the suspension was the 4th received during his NHL career.

On February 1, 2025, in a game against the Ottawa Senators, Hartman was assessed a major match penalty for "Attempt to Injure" after intentionally driving Senators forward Tim Stützle's head into the ice. At the end of the second period, Hartman lined up for a faceoff with Senators' top scorer Stützle; on the ensuing faceoff with Stützle leaning forward for possession of the puck, Hartman removed his right hand from his stick to grab back of Stützle's neck and use his body weight to drive Stützle's head into the ice, causing a cut on Stützle's face which required stiches. Upon stoppage of the play, Hartman was given the major penalty and ejected from the game. On the following 5-minute powerplay, the Senators would score 3 goals and ultimately win the game 6–0. Hartman had been assessed two other penalties for infractions against Stützle prior to the ejection, one for roughing against Stützle, and another for embellishment after diving following a retaliatory slash from Stützle's stick, for which Stützle was also given a slashing penalty. On February 3, Hartman was suspended for 10 games by the NHL for the play, marking his fourth suspension since 2023.

== International play ==
Medal record

Representing the United States

World Junior Championships
Gold medal – first place	2013 Russia	

IIHF U18 Championships
Gold medal – first place	2012 Czech Republic	

Hartman competed for the United States in the 2012 IIHF World U18 Championships. He recorded six points, two goals and four assists, in six games. As a member of the American team, Hartman received a gold medal.

Hartman played for the U.S. in the 2013 World Junior Ice Hockey Championships. He accumulated three points, two goals and an assist, in seven games. As a member of the U.S. team, Hartman received a gold medal. He posted four points with the U.S. team in the 2014 World Junior Ice Hockey Championships, two goals and two assists, in five games.

== Personal life ==
As a 13-year-old, Hartman played football for the Bloomingdale Bears youth football team, along with his friend and former teammate Vinnie Hinostroza.

As of the 2024–25 NCAA season, his 7-years-younger brother, Tanner, plays hockey for the Brown Bears in the ECAC.

== Career statistics ==
=== Regular season and playoffs ===
			Regular season					Playoffs
Season	Team	League	GP	G	A	Pts	PIM	GP	G	A	Pts	PIM
2010–11	U.S. NTDP Juniors	USHL	35	12	8	20	59	2	1	0	1	17
2010–11	U.S. NTDP U17	USDP	52	22	12	34	88	—	—	—	—	—
2010–11	U.S. NTDP U18	USDP	4	0	1	1	4	—	—	—	—	—
2011–12	U.S. NTDP Juniors	USHL	24	7	9	16	46	—	—	—	—	—
2011–12	U.S. NTDP U18	USHL	59	16	25	41	136	—	—	—	—	—
2012–13	Plymouth Whalers	OHL	56	23	37	60	120	9	4	2	6	16
2013–14	Plymouth Whalers	OHL	52	25	28	53	91	5	0	4	4	8
2013–14	Rockford IceHogs	AHL	9	3	4	7	8	—	—	—	—	—
2014–15	Rockford IceHogs	AHL	69	13	24	37	120	8	2	1	3	8
2014–15	Chicago Blackhawks	NHL	5	0	0	0	2	—	—	—	—	—
2015–16	Rockford IceHogs	AHL	61	15	20	35	129	3	1	0	1	4
2015–16	Chicago Blackhawks	NHL	3	0	1	1	0	—	—	—	—	—
2016–17	Chicago Blackhawks	NHL	76	19	12	31	70	4	0	0	0	14
2017–18	Chicago Blackhawks	NHL	57	8	17	25	58	—	—	—	—	—
2017–18	Nashville Predators	NHL	21	3	3	6	14	9	2	1	3	10
2018–19	Nashville Predators	NHL	64	10	10	20	44	—	—	—	—	—
2018–19	Philadelphia Flyers	NHL	19	2	4	6	30	—	—	—	—	—
2019–20	Minnesota Wild	NHL	69	9	11	20	69	4	0	0	0	9
2020–21	Minnesota Wild	NHL	51	7	15	22	33	7	2	0	2	2
2021–22	Minnesota Wild	NHL	82	34	31	65	95	6	0	5	5	2
2022–23	Minnesota Wild	NHL	59	15	22	37	90	5	2	3	5	16
2023–24	Minnesota Wild	NHL	74	21	24	45	72	—	—	—	—	—
2024–25	Minnesota Wild	NHL	69	11	15	26	75	6	2	4	6	2
2025–26	Minnesota Wild	NHL	76	23	20	43	48	11	3	4	7	18
NHL totals			725	162	185	347	700	52	11	17	28	73

=== International ===
Year	Team	Event	Result	GP	G	A	Pts	PIM
2011	United States	U17	2nd place, silver medalist(s)	5	4	2	6	0
2012	United States	U18	1st place, gold medalist(s)	6	2	4	6	22
2013	United States	WJC	1st place, gold medalist(s)	7	2	1	3	16
2014	United States	WJC	5th	5	2	2	4	4
2022	United States	WC	4th	5	1	0	1	6
Junior totals				23	10	9	19	42
Senior totals				5	1	0	1	6

== Awards and honors ==
Award	Year
CHL
CHL/NHL Top Prospects Game	2013
AHL
All-Star Game	2016

Awards and achievements
Preceded by Teuvo Teräväinen	Chicago Blackhawks first-round draft pick 2013	Succeeded by Nick Schmaltz
