= 2012 World Junior A Challenge =

Tournament details
- Host country: Canada
- Venue: Mariners Centre in Yarmouth, Nova Scotia
- Dates: November 5, 2012 – November 12, 2012
- Teams: 6

Final positions
- Champions: United States (4th title)
- Runners-up: Canada West
- Third place: Switzerland
- Fourth place: Canada East

Tournament statistics
- Games played: 13
- Scoring leader: (Switzerland) Sandro Zangger (7 pts.)

Awards
- MVP: (United States) Vince Hinostroza

The 2012 World Junior A Challenge was an international Junior "A" ice hockey tournament organized by Hockey Canada. It was hosted in Yarmouth, Nova Scotia, from November 5–12, 2012, at the Mariners Centre. The event also included the 8th annual Canadian Junior Hockey League Prospects Game Challenge, marking the second time the two events have been paired together.

== Teams ==
- Canada East (7th Appearance, 2nd as Hosts)
- Canada West (7th Appearance)
- Russia (7th Appearance)
- Switzerland (2nd Appearance)
- United States (6th Appearance)
- Czech Republic (2nd Appearance)

== Background ==
Canada East, Canada West, Russia, United States, and Czech Republic all return. Switzerland is back after a hiatus, replacing Sweden.

== Exhibition schedule ==
Exhibition Results
Game	Away team	Score	Home team	Score	Notes	Date – Time – Location
Ex1	Czech Republic	9	Bridgewater Lumberjacks	2	Final - Shots: 32-32 Even	11/02/2012 - 19:00 AST - Liverpool, NS
Ex2	Canada East	4	Russia	2	Final - Shots: 36-22 CANE	11/03/2012 - 19:00 AST - Digby, NS
Ex3	Canada West	4	United States	3	SO Final - Shots: 50-30 USA	22/03/2012 - 19:00 AST - Barrington, NS

== 2012 Tournament ==
=== Group A ===
Pos	Team	Pld	W	OTW	OTL	L	GF	GA	GD	Pts
1	Canada West	2	1	1	0	0	11	3	+8	4
2	Russia	2	1	0	1	0	9	5	+4	3
3	Czech Republic	2	0	0	0	2	1	13	−12	0

=== Group B ===
Pos	Team	Pld	W	OTW	OTL	L	GF	GA	GD	Pts
1	United States	2	2	0	0	0	13	4	+9	4
2	Canada East	2	1	0	0	1	5	12	−7	2
3	Switzerland	2	0	0	0	2	6	8	−2	0

=== Results ===
Round-robin results
Game	Pool	Away team	Score	Home team	Score	Notes	Date – Time – Location
1	A	Russia	6	Czech Republic	1	Final - Shots: 30-27 RUS	11/5/2012 - 16:00 AST - Yarmouth, NS
2	B	United States	9	Canada East	1	Final - Shots: 43-27 USA	11/5/2012 - 19:30 AST - Yarmouth, NS
3	A	Czech Republic	0	Canada West	7	Final - Shots: 33-20 CANW	11/6/2012 - 16:00 AST - Yarmouth, NS
4	B	Switzerland	3	United States	4	Final - Shots: 37-25 USA	11/6/2012 - 19:30 AST - Yarmouth, NS
5	A	Canada West	4	Russia	3	OT Final - Shots: 40-19 RUS	11/7/2012 - 16:00 AST - Yarmouth, NS
6	B	Canada East	4	Switzerland	3	Final - Shots: 34-31 CANE	11/7/2012 - 19:30 AST - Yarmouth, NS

=== Championship Round ===
Championship Results
Game	Away team	Score	Home team	Score	Notes	Date – Time – Location
QF1	Switzerland	4	Russia	1	Final - Shots: 40-24 SUI	11/8/2012 - 16:00 AST - Yarmouth, NS
QF2	Czech Republic	0	Canada East	4	Final - Shots: 28-25 CANE	11/8/2012 - 19:30 AST - Yarmouth, NS
SF1	Switzerland	4	United States	7	Final - Shots: 36-36 EVEN	11/9/2012 - 16:00 AST - Yarmouth, NS
SF2	Canada East	0	Canada West	1	Final - Shots: 25-17 CANW	11/9/2012 - 19:30 AST - Yarmouth, NS
5th	Czech Republic	1	Russia	4	Final - Shots: 41-33 CZE	11/10/2012 - 14:00 AST - Yarmouth, NS
Bronze	Switzerland	6	Canada East	0	Final - Shots: 32-27 SUI	11/10/2012 - 19:30 AST - Yarmouth, NS
Gold	Canada West	3	United States	6	Final - Shots: 33-29 USA	11/11/2012 - 19:30 AST - Yarmouth, NS

=== Final standings ===
	Team
1st place, gold medalist(s)	United States
2nd place, silver medalist(s)	Canada West
3rd place, bronze medalist(s)	Switzerland
4th	Canada East
5th	Russia
6th	Czech Republic

== Statistics ==
=== Scorers ===
Scoring Leaders
Player	Team	GP	G	A	P	PIM
Vince Hinostroza	USA	4	6	2	8	4
Ian Brady	USA	4	0	8	8	4
Austin Cangelosi	USA	4	2	5	7	4
Sandro Zangger	SUI	5	2	5	7	0
Sheldon Dries	USA	4	1	6	7	4
Wade Murphy	CANW	4	3	3	6	10
Christoph Bertschy	SUI	5	3	3	6	16
Robin Leone	SUI	5	3	3	6	0
Artyom Prokhorov	RUS	4	4	1	5	0
Luca Fazzini	SUI	5	4	1	5	4

=== Goaltenders ===
Leading goaltenders
Player	Team	GP	Mins	GA	SO	GAA	Sv%	Record
Ian Bocharov	RUS	1	60:00	1	0	1.00	0.976	1-0
Eamon McAdam	USA	4	220:00	8	0	2.18	0.927	4-0
Melvin Nyffeler	SUI	3	164:46	6	1	2.18	0.925	1-1
Jonah Imoo	CANW	4	241:22	9	0	2.24	0.918	3-1
Igor Shestyorkin	RUS	3	181:22	9	0	2.98	0.897	1-2

== Awards ==
Most Valuable Player: Vince Hinostroza (United States)

All-Star Team

Forwards: Vince Hinostroza (United States), Wade Murphy (Canada West), Sandro Zangger (Switzerland)
Defense: Brady (United States), Stecher (Canada West)
Goalie: Jonah Imoo (Canada West)

== Rosters ==
=== Canada East ===
(Canada) Players: Adrian Ignagni, St. Michael's (OJHL); Jason Pucciarelli, Newmarket (OJHL); Randy Gazzola, Trenton (OJHL); Paul Geiger, Stouffville, (OJHL); Phil Hampton, Oakville (OJHL); Ben Hutton, Kemptville (CCHL); Kevin Lough, Cumberland (CCHL); MacKenzie Weegar, Nepean (CCHL); Aidan Wright, Kingston (OJHL); Drake Caggiula, Stouffville (OJHL); Justin Danforth, Cobourg (OJHL); Jeff DiNallo, Newmarket (OJHL); Kyle Dutra, Toronto Lakeshore (OJHL); David Friedmann, Toronto (OJHL); Daniel Leavens, Newmarket, (OJHL); Patrick Megannety, Georgetown (OJHL); Daniel Milne, St. Michael's (OJHL); Michael Neville, St. Michael's (OJHL); Braedan Russell, Oakville (OJHL); Devin Shore, Whitby (OJHL); Tylor Spink, Cornwall (CCHL); Tyson Spink, Cornwall (CCHL).

Staff:

=== Canada West ===
(Canada) Players:

Staff:

=== Russia ===
(Russia) Players:

Staff:

=== Switzerland ===
(Switzerland) Players:

Staff:

=== Czech Republic ===
(Czech Republic) Players:

Staff:

=== United States ===
(United States) Players:

Staff:

== CJHL Prospects Game ==
For the second consecutive year, the Canadian Junior Hockey League Prospects Game was a part of the WJAC festivities. Just like the previous three Prospects Games, the event was actually two "prospect" games with the President's Cup going to the winning goal aggregate.

=== Results ===
Exhibition Results
Game	Away team	Score	Home team	Score	Notes	Date – Time – Location
1	East Prospects	0	West Prospects	5	Final - Shots: 30-29 EAST	11/10/2012 - 19:00 AST - Digby, NS
2	East Prospects	6	West Prospects	3	Final - Shots: 33-31 EAST	11/11/2012 - 14:00 AST - Yarmouth, NS

=== Rosters ===
==== East Prospects ====
Players:

Staff:

==== West Prospects ====
Players:

Staff:
