= Nick Schmaltz =

American ice hockey player (born 1996)

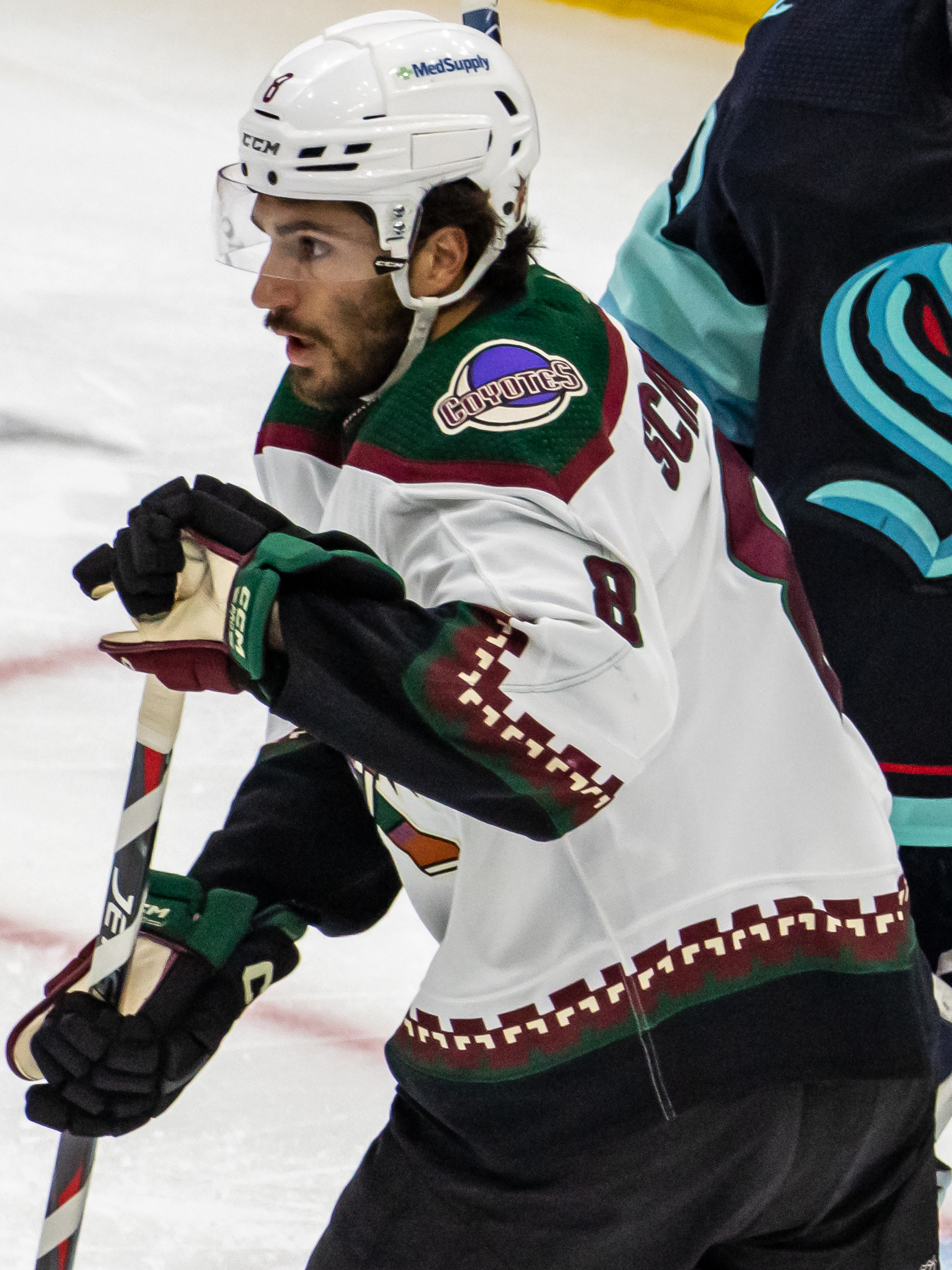
- Schmaltz with the Arizona Coyotes in April 2023
- Born: February 23, 1996 (age 30) Madison, Wisconsin, U.S.
- Height: 6 ft 0 in (183 cm)
- Weight: 184 lb (83 kg; 13 st 2 lb)
- Position: Forward
- Shoots: Right
- NHL team Former teams: Utah Mammoth; Chicago Blackhawks; Arizona Coyotes
- National team: United States
- NHL draft: 20th overall, 2014; Chicago Blackhawks
- Playing career: 2016–present

Nick Schmaltz (born February 23, 1996) is an American professional ice hockey player who is a forward for the Utah Mammoth of the National Hockey League (NHL). He previously played for the Chicago Blackhawks in the NHL, as well as the Arizona Coyotes until the team suspended operations and all hockey assets were transferred to the expansion Utah Mammoth.

Born in Madison, Wisconsin, and raised in Verona, Schmaltz grew up playing hockey in his basement with his brother Jordan and sister Kylie. He followed his brother into playing junior ice hockey for the Green Bay Gamblers of the United States Hockey League. After two full seasons in Green Bay, Schmaltz was selected in the first round, 20th overall, by the Blackhawks in the 2014 NHL entry draft. He went on to play two seasons of college ice hockey with the North Dakota Fighting Hawks. During his second season, North Dakota won the 2016 NCAA Division I Men's Ice Hockey Tournament. Schmaltz had scored the game-winning goal in the tournament semifinals with only 60 seconds left to play and added an assist in their championship victory.

Schmaltz left North Dakota after winning a championship title to begin his professional hockey career. He spent most of his rookie season with the Rockford IceHogs, the Blackhawks' American Hockey League affiliate, before having a breakout 2017–18 season playing with Ryan Hartman and Patrick Kane. Schmaltz could not continue his offensive output the following season, and he was traded to the Coyotes in November 2018. He missed most of the 2018–19 season with a knee injury but returned the following year to lead the team with 45 points. During the Coyotes' 2021–22 roster overhaul, Schmaltz was part of the core group of players they chose to build around, and that March he set a franchise record with seven points in one game.

== Early life ==
Schmaltz was born on February 23, 1996, in Madison, Wisconsin. His father Mike owns a series of fitness centers, while his mother Lisa is a radiologist for the UW Health University Hospital. Their family home in Verona, Wisconsin, had a makeshift roller hockey rink in the basement, with Nick's older brother Jordan and younger sister Kylie teaming up to play against him. He played four seasons of organized hockey, meanwhile, with the Chicago Mission of the Tier 1 Elite Hockey League, where he grew close with teammate and future National Hockey League (NHL) player Christian Dvorak. Schmaltz centered an offensive line with Dvorak on his left wing and William Nylander on his right.

Schmaltz followed his older brother into playing for the Green Bay Gamblers of the United States Hockey League (USHL). He joined the team as an affiliate player for the final 11 games of the 2011–12 regular season, contributing one postseason goal and three assists as the Gamblers took the 2012 Clark Cup. During the 2012–13 season, Schmaltz recorded 18 goals and 52 points in 64 games, including five game-winning goals and a hat-trick on December 31, 2012. He was the youngest member of the USHL All-Rookie Team at the end of that season. The following season, Schmaltz posted 18 goals and 63 points in 55 games, and the NHL Central Scouting Bureau ranked him No. 19 among all draft-eligible North American skaters. At the end of the 2013–14 USHL season, the Chicago Blackhawks selected Schmaltz in the first round, 20th overall, of the 2014 NHL entry draft.

== Playing career ==
=== College ===
Beginning in the 2014–15 season, Schmaltz followed his older brother into playing college ice hockey for the North Dakota Fighting Hawks. He began his freshman season on a hot streak, named the National Collegiate Hockey Conference (NCHC) Rookie of the Month for October after leading all freshmen with six points in as many games. On February 23, 2015, Schmaltz was named the NCHC Rookie of the Week for assisting on two goals of the Fighting Hawks' 3–0 shutout win over Western Michigan. Schmaltz recorded five goals, 21 assists, and a +4 plus-minus rating in 35 games. The Fighting Hawks were the NCHC regular-season champions for the 2014–15 season, and Schmaltz, who had four goals and 11 assists in 20 conference games, was named to the NCHC All-Rookie Team. North Dakota played in the 2015 NCAA Division I Men's Ice Hockey Tournament, where they were eliminated in the Frozen Four by Jack Eichel and Boston University. Schmaltz had no points in the tournament.

Returning to North Dakota for the 2015–16 season, Schmaltz centered a line with Drake Caggiula and Brock Boeser, a trio referred to as the "CBS line". He was named the NCHC Player of the Month for November after recording two goals and 13 assists in eight games, including five multi-point outings. With five goals and 19 assists in 19 conference games, Schmaltz was an All-NCHC honorable mention at the end of the season. Altogether, he had 11 goals and 46 points in 37 games, third on the team behind his linemates Caggiula and Boeser. The Fighting Hawks tied with Denver for third place in the 2016 NCHC Tournament, while Schmaltz, who scored two of the team's three goals in the Frozen Faceoff, was named to the All-Tournament Team. North Dakota once again played in the NCAA Tournament, where they faced Denver in the Frozen Four semifinals. Deadlocked at 2–2 with 60 seconds remaining in regulation, Schmaltz scored the game-winning goal, with North Dakota winning the game 4–2 shortly after on an empty net goal from Rhett Gardner. He added an assist in North Dakota's 5–1 victory over Quinnipiac, which gave the Fighting Hawks their first NCAA championship title since 2000. After his sophomore season, Schmaltz elected to leave North Dakota and signed a three-year, entry-level contract with the Blackhawks. In 75 games across two collegiate seasons, he recorded 16 goals and 56 assists.

=== Professional (2016–present) ===
==== Chicago Blackhawks (2016–2018) ====
Several members of the Blackhawks' forward core from the 2015–16 season, such as Bryan Bickell, Andrew Shaw and Teuvo Teräväinen, could not return to the team the next year due to NHL salary cap limitations, giving younger players like Schmaltz an opportunity to prove themselves at the NHL level. Schmaltz made his NHL debut in the first game of the 2016–17 season on October 12, 2016, in a 5–2 loss to the St. Louis Blues. He scored his first NHL goal three days later, opening scoring in a 5–3 win over the Nashville Predators that was won on Richard Panik's hat-trick. His offensive output was negligible from then on, with only a goal and three assists for four points in 26 games, and on December 4, the Blackhawks sent a slumping Schmaltz to their American Hockey League (AHL) affiliate, the Rockford IceHogs. He added six goals and three assists there before he was called back up to Chicago on January 14, 2017, as a replacement for the ill Artem Anisimov. Playing on the top offensive line with Panik and Jonathan Toews, Schmaltz's performance improved during the second half of the season, and he finished with six goals and 22 assists for 28 points in 61 games. Schmaltz made his postseason debut with the Blackhawks in the first game in the first round of the 2017 playoffs on April 13, 2017. As the series went on, the top-seeded Blackhawks as a team scored only three goals in a four-game sweep by the eighth-seeded Nashville Predators.

Schmaltz had a three-point outing in the first game of the 2017–18 season on October 5, 2017, with two goals and an assist in the Blackhawks' 10–1 rout of the newly two-time defending Stanley Cup champion Pittsburgh Penguins. Otherwise, he had a slow start to the season, with only four goals through his first 25 games. That changed on December 10, when Schmaltz's goal against the Arizona Coyotes led him on a streak in which he scored eight times in 13 games. On December 29, Anisimov was placed on injured reserve, and Schmaltz took his place as the Blackhawks' second line center, with Ryan Hartman and Patrick Kane on the wings. That combination proved successful for all parties: 37 games into the season, Schmaltz had equaled his 28 points from the previous season. He assisted on six of Kane's first 17 goals, and Kane assisted on seven of Schmaltz's 10 goals. On February 21, Schmaltz scored the shootout win in what ended up being a 3–2 win over the Ottawa Senators. Schmaltz's major development over the course of his sophomore season was to gain confidence with the puck rather than passing to more experienced players like Kane and Toews. By March 10, his 46 points were tied with Toews for second on the Blackhawks, behind only Kane's 64 points. Although the Blackhawks missed the Stanley Cup playoffs for the first time since the 2007–08 season, finishing 19 points behind the Colorado Avalanche in the race for the second Western Conference wild card spot, Schmaltz had a successful season, finishing with 21 goals and 31 assists for 52 points in 78 games.

While Schmaltz had previously faced his older brother Jordan, a defenseman for the St. Louis Blues, in the preseason and AHL, the brothers did not meet in a regular-season NHL game until October 13, 2018, when the Blackhawks defeated the Blues 4–3 in overtime. He did not score until the eighth game of the 2018–19 season, shortly after head coach Joel Quenneville pushed Schmaltz to the left wing and put Anisimov at center. Schmaltz struggled to produce offensively even after that, with only two goals and nine assists in 23 games with the Blackhawks.

==== Arizona Coyotes (2018–2024) ====
On November 25, 2018, the Blackhawks traded Schmaltz to the Arizona Coyotes in exchange for forwards Dylan Strome and Brendan Perlini. He was placed on Arizona's top line, centering Clayton Keller and Alex Galchenyuk, and scored five points in as many games after the trade. He ultimately produced five goals and 14 points in 17 games until December 30, after which the Coyotes announced that he would miss the remainder of the season with a lower-body injury. Schmaltz later revealed that his knee had been bothering him for a long period of time and that he could not name a specific moment that had caused the injury, which required a season-ending surgery.

On March 30, 2019, with Schmaltz set to become a restricted free agent that July, the Coyotes signed him to a seven-year, $40.95 million contract extension. He fell to the second line for the Coyotes 2019–20 season, reunited with Christian Dvorak on one wing and with newcomer Conor Garland on the other. By December 12, Schmaltz led the Coyotes with 22 points, including 17 assists and two game-winning goals. By the time that the 2019–20 NHL season was suspended in March due to the COVID-19 pandemic, Schmaltz had a team-leading 45 points (11 goals and 34 assists), including four shootout goals. Schmaltz said in an interview that he believed he "started off really well ... I didn't love my game in the middle of the season so much, but I felt toward the end I was trending in the right direction." When the NHL returned to play for the 2020 Stanley Cup playoffs in Edmonton, Schmaltz was one of 31 players invited to join the quarantine bubble. After receiving a hit to the head during an exhibition game against the Vegas Golden Knights, however, Schmaltz missed the entirety of the Coyotes' postseason run, which came to an end when they were defeated by the Colorado Avalanche in five games of the Western Conference First Round.

The 2020–21 season meant a reunion for Schmaltz and his college linemate Drake Caggiula, who signed with the Coyotes that offseason. Beginning at the start of February, Schmaltz played on an offensive line with Garland and Keller. Head coach Rick Tocchet nicknamed the trio the "Short Leash line" for their presumed defensive liabilities despite their offensive production. Within four games of playing together, the line had a combined 15 points, with Schmaltz recording two goals and five points in that span. On March 27, the NHL Department of Player Safety awarded Schmaltz a $5,000 fine for dangerously pushing San Jose Sharks defenseman Radim Simek into the boards the day prior. On May 3, with three regular-season games left to play for the Coyotes, Schmaltz was hit in the head during pregame warmups by a puck that bounced off the crossbar of the goal net. He was assisted off the ice and missed that night's game with an upper-body injury. Unexpectedly playing without him, the Coyotes lost 3–2 to the Los Angeles Kings that night, a loss which mathematically eliminated them from the 2021 Stanley Cup playoffs. Schmaltz finished the season with 10 goals and 32 points. That July, he was one of 11 players that the Coyotes chose to protect from being taken by the Seattle Kraken in the 2021 NHL expansion draft.

The Coyotes underwent a major roster overhaul prior to the 2021–22 season, with Schmaltz part of a core group of young players that the team wished to build around. The team suffered a number of injuries early in the season, and Schmaltz was sidelined with an upper body injury after only six games. He returned to the lineup on December 11 and scored his first goal of the season two days later against the Philadelphia Flyers. On March 5, 2022, the day after ending the Colorado Avalanche's four-game winning streak with a late goal, Schmaltz became the first player in franchise history to record a seven-point game when he recorded two goals and five assists in an 8–5 comeback win over the Ottawa Senators. He added another four points in the Coyotes' next game, a 9–2 blowout win over the Detroit Red Wings, and became the first player in franchise history to record 11 points in a two-game span. Schmaltz finished the 2021–22 season with a career-high 23 goals, 36 assists, and 59 points.

==== Utah Mammoth (2024–present) ====
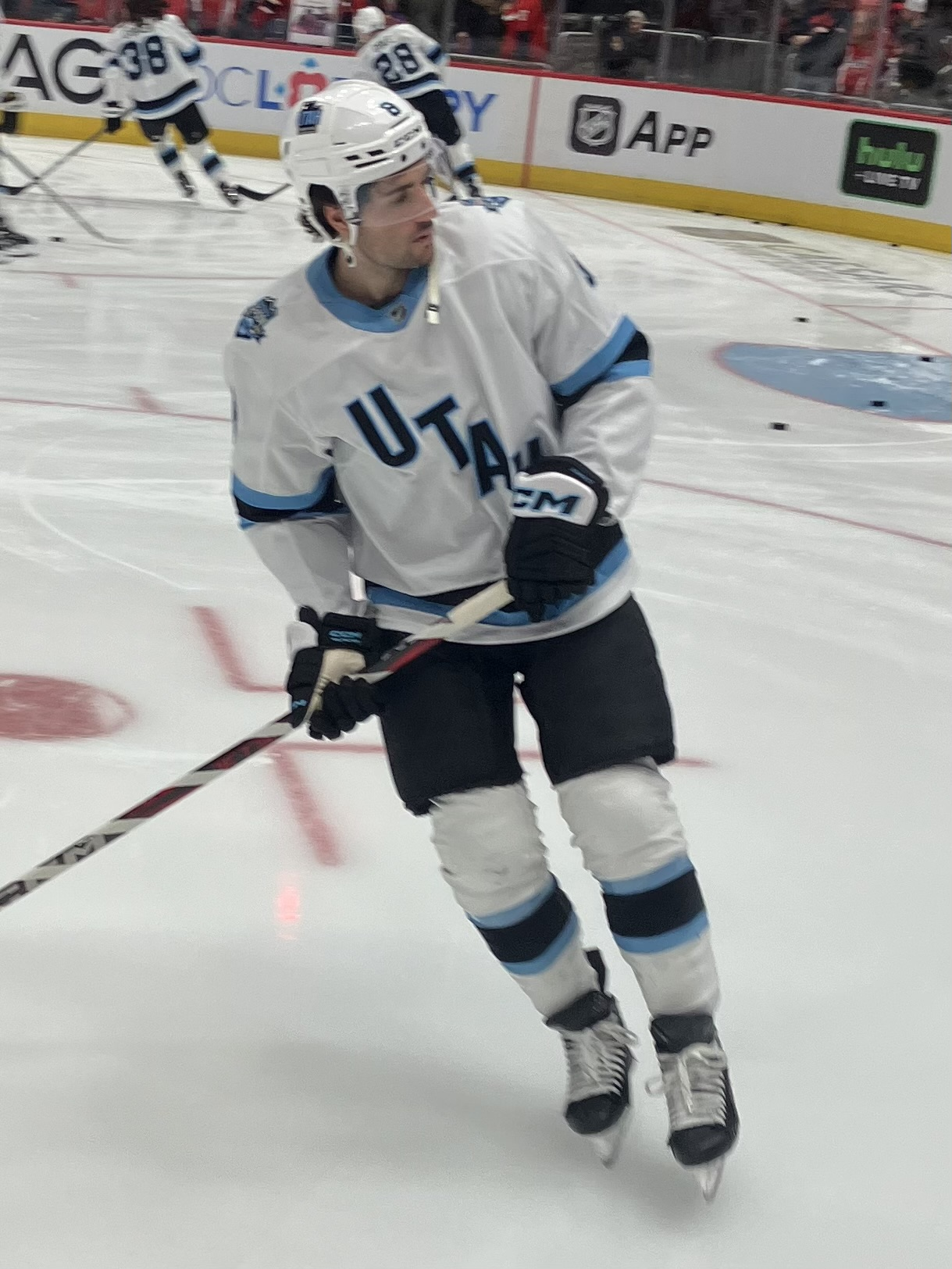
Schmaltz with the Utah Hockey Club in February 2025.

Shortly after the end of the 2023–24 season, the Coyotes' franchise was suspended and team assets were subsequently transferred to the expansion Utah Mammoth; as a result, Schmaltz became a member of the Utah team.

On March 11, 2026, Schmaltz signed an eight-year, $64 million contract extension with the Mammoth.

== International play ==
Medal record

Representing United States

Ice hockey

World Junior Championships
Bronze medal – third place	2016 Finland	

Ivan Hlinka Memorial Tournament
Silver medal – second place	2013 Břeclav/Piešťany	

World Junior A Challenge
Gold medal – first place	2013 Yarmouth	

Schmaltz first represented the United States internationally at the 2013 Ivan Hlinka Memorial Tournament in the Czech Republic and Slovakia. There, he led all United States scorers with five goals and nine points, while his team took the silver medal after they were shut out 4–0 by the Canadian under-18 team. Later that year, Schmaltz was part of the gold medal-winning United States team at the 2013 World Junior A Challenge in Yarmouth, Nova Scotia. His assist on Kyle Connor's game-winning goal in their 4–1 championship victory over Russia was his 12th point of the tournament, breaking Kyle Turris and Mike Connolly's record for the most in the Challenge, while he tied Ian Brady's record eight assists. At the end of the tournament, Schmaltz was named the World Junior A Challenge MVP and was part of the Tournament All-Star Team.

During his freshman year at North Dakota, Schmaltz was selected to play for the United States junior team in the 2015 World Junior Ice Hockey Championships. His first goal and assist of the tournament came during the United States team's 10–1 rout of Switzerland during the preliminary rounds, but the team fell short of a medal, finishing the tournament in fifth place. He played with the US junior team again for the 2016 World Junior Ice Hockey Championships, this time recording eight points in seven games and winning a bronze medal as Team USA defeated Sweden 8–3 in the third-place match.

Following his first season of professional hockey, Schmaltz and teammate Trevor van Riemsdyk represented the United States senior team at the 2017 IIHF World Championship. He recorded three assists in the tournament for the United States, who failed to medal after they were shut out 2–0 by Finland in the semifinal round.

== Personal life ==
Schmaltz's older brother Jordan is also a professional ice hockey player. After spending time in the NHL with the St. Louis Blues, Toronto Maple Leafs, and New York Islanders, he then played in Europe. Their younger sister Kylie, meanwhile, played volleyball for the Kentucky Wildcats. Outside of his immediate family, Schmaltz's cousin Jake began playing college hockey for North Dakota in 2021 as a Boston Bruins prospect.

== Career statistics ==
=== Regular season and playoffs ===
			Regular season					Playoffs
Season	Team	League	GP	G	A	Pts	PIM	GP	G	A	Pts	PIM
2011–12	Green Bay Gamblers	USHL	11	1	3	4	2	—	—	—	—	—
2012–13	Green Bay Gamblers	USHL	64	18	34	52	15	4	1	1	2	0
2013–14	Green Bay Gamblers	USHL	55	18	45	63	16	4	1	2	3	17
2014–15	University of North Dakota	NCHC	38	5	21	26	12	—	—	—	—	—
2015–16	University of North Dakota	NCHC	37	11	35	46	6	—	—	—	—	—
2016–17	Chicago Blackhawks	NHL	61	6	22	28	6	4	0	0	0	2
2016–17	Rockford IceHogs	AHL	12	6	3	9	2	—	—	—	—	—
2017–18	Chicago Blackhawks	NHL	78	21	31	52	18	—	—	—	—	—
2018–19	Chicago Blackhawks	NHL	23	2	9	11	6	—	—	—	—	—
2018–19	Arizona Coyotes	NHL	17	5	9	14	2	—	—	—	—	—
2019–20	Arizona Coyotes	NHL	70	11	34	45	20	—	—	—	—	—
2020–21	Arizona Coyotes	NHL	52	10	22	32	16	—	—	—	—	—
2021–22	Arizona Coyotes	NHL	63	23	36	59	14	—	—	—	—	—
2022–23	Arizona Coyotes	NHL	63	22	36	58	20	—	—	—	—	—
2023–24	Arizona Coyotes	NHL	79	22	39	61	10	—	—	—	—	—
2024–25	Utah Hockey Club	NHL	82	20	43	63	14	—	—	—	—	—
2025–26	Utah Mammoth	NHL	82	33	41	74	28	6	1	3	4	2
NHL totals			670	175	322	497	154	10	1	3	4	4

=== International ===
Year	Team	Event	Result	GP	G	A	Pts	PIM
2013	United States	IH18	2nd place, silver medalist(s)	5	5	3	8	2
2015	United States	WJC	5th	5	0	1	1	0
2016	United States	WJC	3rd place, bronze medalist(s)	7	2	6	8	4
2017	United States	WC	5th	7	0	3	3	2
Junior totals				17	7	10	17	6
Senior totals				7	0	3	3	2

== Awards and honors ==
Award	Year	Ref.
USHL
All-Rookie Team	2013	
NCHC
All-Rookie Team	2014	
All-NCHC honorable mention	2015	
All-Tournament Team	2015	
International
World Junior A Challenge Most Valuable Player	2013	
World Junior A Challenge All-Star Team	2013	

Awards and achievements
Preceded by Ryan Hartman	Chicago Blackhawks first-round draft pick 2014	Succeeded by Henri Jokiharju
