= 2013 World Junior A Challenge =

Tournament details
- Host country: Canada
- Venue: Mariners Centre in Yarmouth, Nova Scotia
- Dates: November 4, 2013 – November 10, 2013
- Teams: 6

Final positions
- Champions: United States (5th title)
- Runners-up: Russia
- Third place: Canada West
- Fourth place: Switzerland

Tournament statistics
- Games played: 13
- Scoring leader: (United States) Nick Schmaltz (12 pts.)

Awards
- MVP: (United States) Nick Schmaltz

The 2013 World Junior A Challenge was an international Junior "A" ice hockey tournament organized by Hockey Canada. It was hosted in Yarmouth, Nova Scotia, from November 4–10, 2013, at the Mariners Centre. The event included the 9th annual Canadian Junior Hockey League Prospects Game Challenge, marking the third time the two events have been paired together.

== Teams ==
- Canada East (8th Appearance, 3rd as Hosts)
- Canada West (8th Appearance)
- Russia (8th Appearance)
- Switzerland (3rd Appearance)
- United States (7th Appearance)
- Czech Republic (3rd Appearance)

== Background ==
Canada East, Canada West, Russia, United States, Switzerland, and Czech Republic all return.

== Exhibition schedule ==
Exhibition Results
Game	Away team	Score	Home team	Score	Notes	Date – Time – Location
Ex1	United States	4	Canada West	3	Final - Shots: 33-26 USA	02/11/13 - 19:00 AST - Digby, NS
Ex2	Czech Republic	3	Canada East	2	Final - Shots: 40-30 CANE	02/11/13 - 19:00 AST - Barrington, NS

== 2013 Tournament ==
=== Group A ===
Pos	Team	Pld	W	OTW	OTL	L	GF	GA	GD	Pts
1	United States	2	2	0	0	0	12	5	+7	4
2	Russia	2	1	0	0	1	9	10	−1	2
3	Canada East	2	0	0	0	2	4	10	−6	0

=== Group B ===
Pos	Team	Pld	W	OTW	OTL	L	GF	GA	GD	Pts
1	Canada West	2	2	0	0	0	8	4	+4	4
2	Switzerland	2	1	0	0	1	5	4	+1	2
3	Czech Republic	2	0	0	0	2	1	6	−5	0

=== Results ===
Round-robin results
Game	Pool	Away team	Score	Home team	Score	Notes	Date – Time – Location
1	B	Canada West	4	Switzerland	3	Final - Shots: 42-34 CANW	04/11/13 - 16:00 AST - Yarmouth, NS
2	A	Canada East	2	Russia	6	Final - Shots: 40-30 RUS	04/11/13 - 20:00 AST - Yarmouth, NS
3	B	Czech Republic	1	Canada West	4	Final - Shots: 33-30 CANW	05/11/13 - 16:00 AST - Yarmouth, NS
4	A	Russia	3	United States	8	Final - Shots: 41-25 USA	05/11/13 - 20:00 AST - Yarmouth, NS
5	B	Switzerland	2	Czech Republic	0	Final - Shots: 42-23 CZE	06/11/13 - 16:00 AST - Yarmouth, NS
6	A	United States	4	Canada East	2	Final - Shots: 28-25 USA	06/11/13 - 20:00 AST - Yarmouth, NS

=== Championship Round ===
Championship Results
Game	Away team	Score	Home team	Score	Notes	Date – Time – Location
QF1	Czech Republic	1	Russia	3	Final - Shots: 42-31 CZE	07/11/13 - 16:00 AST - Yarmouth, NS
QF2	Canada East	4	Switzerland	5	OT Final - Shots: 42-29 CANE	07/11/13 - 20:00 AST - Yarmouth, NS
SF1	Russia	5	Canada West	2	Final - Shots: 33-27 RUS	08/11/13 - 16:00 AST - Yarmouth, NS
SF2	Switzerland	4	United States	7	Final - Shots: 37-19 USA	08/11/13 - 20:00 AST - Yarmouth, NS
5th	Czech Republic	7	Canada East	5	Final - Shots: 40-32 CZE	09/11/13 - 19:00 AST - Liverpool, NS
Bronze	Switzerland	3	Canada West	5	Final - Shots: 38-24 CANW	09/11/13 - 20:00 AST - Yarmouth, NS
Gold	Russia	1	United States	4	Final - Shots: 29-17 USA	10/11/13 - 12:00 AST - Yarmouth, NS

=== Final standings ===
	Team
1st place, gold medalist(s)	United States
2nd place, silver medalist(s)	Russia
3rd place, bronze medalist(s)	Canada West
4th	Switzerland
5th	Czech Republic
6th	Canada East

== Statistics ==
=== Scorers ===
Scoring Leaders
Player	Team	GP	G	A	P	PIM
(United States) Nick Schmaltz	USA	4	4	8	12	0
(United States) Connor Hurley	USA	4	3	7	10	0
(Russia) Kirill Pilipenko	RUS	5	4	4	8	2
(Canada) Dylan Hoffman	CANW	4	4	3	7	0
(Russia) Vladislav Kamenev	RUS	5	1	6	7	26
(Canada) Marty Quince	CANE	4	4	2	6	4
(Czech Republic) Adam Zboril	CZE	4	2	4	6	18
(United States) Karson Kuhlman	USA	4	4	1	5	0
(Canada) Nicholas Jones	CANW	4	3	2	5	2
(Russia) Daniil Vovchenko	RUS	5	3	2	5	9

=== Goaltenders ===
Leading goaltenders
Player	Team	GP	Mins	GA	SO	GAA	Sv%	Record
(Czech Republic) Karel Vejmelka	CZE	2	120:00	4	0	2.00	0.925	0-2
(United States) Chris Birdsall	USA	1	60:00	2	0	2.00	0.923	1-0
(Switzerland) Maxim Mauerhofer	SUI	3	183:54	11	1	3.59	0.909	2-1
(Russia) Maxim Tretiak	RUS	5	276:23	14	0	3.04	0.906	3-2
(Canada) Jesse Jenks	CANW	4	240:00	12	0	3.00	0.901	3-1

== Awards ==
Most Valuable Player: (United States) Nick Schmaltz

All-Star Team

Forwards: (United States) Nick Schmaltz, (United States) Connor Hurley, (Russia) Kirill Pilipenko
Defense: (United States) Neal Pionk, (Canada) Adam Plant
Goalie: (Russia) Maxim Tretiak

== CJHL Prospects Game ==
For the third consecutive year, the Canadian Junior Hockey League Prospects Game was a part of the WJAC festivities. Just like the previous four Prospects Games, the event was actually two "prospect" games with the President's Cup going to the winning goal aggregate.

Prospects East won their fourth President's Cup in nine years with an 8-4 aggregate victory (4-2, 4-2) over Prospects West.

=== Results ===
Exhibition Results
Game	Away team	Score	Home team	Score	Notes	Date – Time – Location
1	Prospects East	4	Prospects West	2	Final - Shots: 42-20 West	08/11/13 - 19:00 AST - Digby, NS
2	Prospects East	4	Prospects West	2	Final - Shots: 38-25 West	09/11/13 - 16:00 AST - Yarmouth, NS
