= Thompkins =

Thompkins may refer to:

- Brandon Thompkins (born 1987), arena football wide receiver
- Carlotta J. Thompkins (1844–1934), 19th century Texas gambler known as Lottie Deno
- DeAndre Thompkins (born 1995), American football player
- Deven Thompkins (born 1999), American football player
- Gerry Thompkins (born 1937), Canadian football player
- Kenbrell Thompkins (born 1988), American football wide receiver
- Kendal Thompkins (born 1989), American Football wide receiver
- Leslie Thompkins, fictional character in comic books, associated with Batman
- Russell Thompkins of The Stylistics, soul music vocal group in Philadelphia
- Trey Thompkins (born 1990), American professional basketball player
- William H. Thompkins (1872–1916), Buffalo Soldier in the United States Army
- William J. Thompkins (1884–1944), physician and health administrator in Kansas City, Missouri

== See also ==
- Tomkins (disambiguation)
- Tompkins (disambiguation)
