= Tompkins (surname) =

Tompkins is a surname. Notable people with the surname include:

- Aaron B. Tompkins (1844–1931), American cavalry soldier and Medal of Honor recipient
- Andrew Tompkins, Australian musician
- Angel Tompkins (born 1942), American actress
- Anne Tompkins (born 1962), American lawyer
- Arthur S. Tompkins (1865–1938), U.S. Representative from New York
- Barry Tompkins (born 1940), American sportscaster
- Bernard Tompkins (1904–1965), New York politician
- Brian Tompkins, Yale Varsity Soccer coach
- Caleb Tompkins (1759–1846), U.S. Representative from New York
- Charles Henry Tompkins (1830–1915), Union Brevet Brigadier General during the American Civil War and Medal of Honor winner
- Charles Henry Tompkins Sr. (1834–1895), Union Brevet Brigadier General during the American Civil War from Rhode Island
- Charles Hook Tompkins (1883–1956), American engineer and architect
- Chris Tompkins, American songwriter
- Christopher Tompkins (1780–1858), U.S. Representative from Kentucky
- Cydnor B. Tompkins (1810–1862), U.S. Representative from Ohio
- Daniel D. Tompkins (1775–1824), American Vice-president
- Darlene Tompkins (1940–2019), American actress
- David Tompkins (1929–2023), New Zealand lawyer and jurist
- Don Tompkins (1933–1982), American jewelry artist
- Douglas Tompkins (1943–2015), American environmentalist, co-founder of outdoor clothing companies, owner of Pumalín Park, Chile
- Emmett Tompkins (1853–1917), U.S. Representative from Ohio
- Fred Tompkins (born 1943), American jazz flautist
- Gwyn R. Tompkins (1861–1938), American horse racing trainer
- Hannah Tompkins (1721–1829), wife of Daniel D. Tompkins
- Hannah Tompkins (1920–1995), American artist
- Hilary Tompkins, American lawyer
- Jack Tompkins (1909–1993), American baseball and ice hockey player
- James Tompkins, Australian rules footballer
- Jason Tompkins, British actor
- Jessie Tompkins (born 1959), former American athlete
- Joan Tompkins (1915–2005), American actress
- Joe Tompkins (born 1968), American professional skier
- Joe I. Tompkins, costume designer, see Academy Award for Best Costume Design
- John Almy Tompkins (1837–1916), Union Brevet Lieutenant Colonel during the American Civil War
- John Almy Tompkins II (11871-1941), American architect
- Kris Tompkins (born 1950), American conservationist
- Larry Tompkins (born 1963), retired Irish Gaelic football manager
- Madeline Tompkins (born 1952), American airline pilot, co-pilot Aloha Airlines flight 243
- Mark Tompkins (racehorse trainer), British racehorse trainer
- Mark Tompkins (dancer) (born 1954), American-born French artist, dancer and choreographer
- Mike Tompkins (politician) (born 1948), U.S. politician
- Mike Tompkins (musician) (born 1987), Canadian musician
- Minthorne Tompkins (1807–1881), New York politician
- Oscar Tompkins (1893–1969), American lawyer
- Patrick W. Tompkins (died 1853), U.S. Representative from Mississippi
- Paul F. Tompkins (born 1968), American actor and comedian
- Pauline Tompkins (died 2004), American educator
- Peter Tompkins (1919–2007), American journalist
- Ptolemy Tompkins (born 1962), American writer
- Richard Tompkins (1918–1992), American entrepreneur
- Ronald G. Tompkins, American physician and academic
- Ross Tompkins (1938–2006), American jazz pianist
- Sally Louisa Tompkins (1833–1916), American humanitarian, nurse and philanthropist
- Shawn Tompkins (1974–2011), Canadian former martial arts fighter
- Stephen Tompkins (born 1971), American artist and animator
- Steve Tompkins, American television writer
- Sue Tompkins (born 1971), British visual and sound artist
- Tony Tompkins (born 1982), Canadian football player

== See also ==
- Tomkins (surname), including a list of people with the name
