= 2009 World Junior A Challenge =

Tournament details
- Host country: Canada
- Venue(s): Consolidated Credit Union Place in Summerside, Prince Edward Island
- Dates: November 1, 2009 – November 8, 2009
- Teams: 6

Final positions
- Champions: United States (2nd title)
- Runners-up: Canada West
- Third place: Russia
- Fourth place: Canada East

Tournament statistics
- Games played: 13
- Scoring leader(s): (Canada) Cody Kunyk (10 points)

Awards
- MVP: (Canada) Sean Bonar

The 2009 World Junior A Challenge was an international Junior "A" ice hockey tournament hosted by Hockey Canada. The 2009 World Junior A Challenge was hosted by the Canadian City of Summerside, Prince Edward Island from November 1 to November 8, 2009 at the Consolidated Credit Union Place.

== Teams ==
The two host Canadian teams will return, along with Russia, Belarus, and the United States. Replacing Germany at this event will be Sweden attending for the first time in the tournament's four-year history.

== Summary ==
=== Exhibition ===
The first game of exhibition for the 2009 tournament was between Canada West and Belarus at the Charlottetown Civic Centre in Charlottetown, Prince Edward Island on October 29, 2009. After a scoreless first period, Belarus jumped to a 2–0 lead in the second. Canada West scored twice in the third, including the tying goal with one second of play remaining to force overtime. Overtime was scoreless, which led to a shootout. Kellen Jones of Canada West scored the only goal of the shootout to get the 1–0 shootout win on three penalty shots each. The same night, at the Colchester Legion Stadium in Truro, Nova Scotia, the Maritime Junior A Hockey League All-Stars challenged Canada East. The Maritimers led 3-1 after the first period and 5-4 after the second. In the third, Canada East scored the lone goal to force overtime. OT solved nothing and led to a lengthy shootout. The MJAHL's Nick Huard made it 1–0 on the first shot, Canada East's Andrew Calof made it 1–1 on the next shot. The MJAHL's Darcy Ashley made it 2–1 on the third shot and Canada East's Brock Higgs scored to knot it at 2 on the sixth shot. After the first six shooters, the shootout became sudden death. All of the next eight penalty shots were stopped before the MJAHL's Stuart Lenehan made it 3–2 on the 15th shot of the shootout. Jeff Vanderlugt of Canada East tied it at 3 on the next shot. On the 17th shot of the shootout, the MJAHL's Matt Milson made it 4-3 and on the 18th Canada East's Kyle Just could not beat the MJAHL's Kirk Rafuse, ending the game as a 6–5 shootout victory for the MJAHL All-Stars. The irony of this MJAHL victory is that the Canada East squad represents the MJAHL at the WJAC, and that the Canada East active roster has no MJAHL players on it.

On the second and final day of exhibition games, October 30, 2009, The MJAHL All-Stars concluded their involvement in the 2009 WJAC with a 5–4 victory over Belarus at the Amherst Stadium in Amherst, Nova Scotia. Despite being outshot, the Maritimers led 2-0 and 5–2 at different parts of the game and survived the late rally by Belarus. At the O'Leary Community Sports Centre in O'Leary, Prince Edward Island, Canada East routed Russia 9–1. The Canadians jumped to an early 4–0 lead and finished the first leading 4–1. After the second it was 7–1. Canada East fumbled the Russian net with shots, leading in the category 44–28. The final game of the night was between the United States and Canada West at the Montague and Area Wellness Centre in Montague, Prince Edward Island, a rematch of the 2008 World Junior A Challenge final. Despite being tied 2–2 at the end of the first, the defending champs from the United States scored three unanswered goals to finish off the game 5–2. Canada West outshot them 30–27.

=== Round Robin ===
The Canada West squad and Russia kicked off the 2009 WJAC festivities on November 1, 2009. Despite outshooting the Russians, the Russians played a tight defensive game and held on to a tight 2–1 victory to take early control of Pool A. In the late game, Canada East and the United States squared off in a fierce battle. Tied 4-4 after regulation and overtime, the game went to a shootout. Canada East went 3 for 3 on the shootout to win the game, while the United States managed 2 for 3 because they did not manage to score on their final shot, picking up only the regulation tie.

On the second day of the round robin, Russia played Sweden. This was Sweden's first ever WJAC game. Despite being badly outshot by the Swedes, the Russians put on another defensive clinic and won the game 3–2 in a shootout to clinch Pool A's top spot. In the second game of the day, Canada East and Belarus squared off in a real barn burner. Combining for 12 goals, the Canadians won 7–5 to clinch the top spot of Pool B for the playoff round.

To start the final day of the round robin, Canada West took on Sweden. Despite badly outshooting the Canadians, the Swedes could not keep the puck out of their own net resulting in a 6–3 loss. Canada West finishes second in Pool A, while Sweden finishes third in Pool A. In the final game of the round robin, the United States bombed the Belorussians 6–1 to take the second seed in Pool B, the third seed in Pool B automatically went to Belarus with the loss.

=== Quarter-final ===
On November 5, 2009, the United States and Sweden met in the early game of the quarter-final. In a tight battle the USA maintained the scoring edge to relegate Sweden to the 5th place game on Saturday with a 3–1 win. In the late game, Canada West dominated the Belorussians with a 7–3 victory. Belarus will meet Sweden in the aforementioned 5th place game, while the United States will play Russia in Semi-final A and the two Canadian squads will face-off in Semi-final B.

=== 5th place and semifinal ===
On November 6, in Semi-final A, Russia and the United States squared off for a berth into the gold medal game. The Americans had built up an early 4–0 lead by the halfway point of the game, but the Russians stormed back to make it 4-3 late in the game. The Americans scored two late goals to clinch the victory and a chance for their second straight gold medal; the Russian were forced to play for bronze. In Semi-final B, the two Canadian teams met in the tournament for the first time since 2007. Canada West led 2-1 after one and 7-1 after two, as Canada East were chased out of the building with a 9–1 loss. Kunyk scored a hat-trick for Canada West in the win. Canada West competed against the United States in the Gold Medal Game, a rematch of the 2008 World Junior A Challenge, while Canada East and Russia played for Bronze.

The next day, Sweden and Belarus fought for fifth place in the tournament. Kachan and Remezov had given Belarus a 2–0 lead by the end of the second. Dyk and Almquist scored to tie it up early in the third. Remezov scored again for Belarus and soon after Johansson scored to tie it for Sweden. Late in the game Drozd scored for Belarus to give them a 4–3 edge, then Mallauka capped it off with an empty-net goal to finish off the Swedes.

=== Bronze and Gold ===
In the Bronze Medal Game, Canada East dropped a 6-2 decision to Russia. For the first time in tournament history the Eastern Canadians walk away without a medal, but for the first time since the 2006 World Junior A Challenge Russia finishes higher than fourth.

The Gold Medal Game was a tight affair. Canada West and the United States were tied 0-0 after the first and 1-1 after the second. Early in the third, the Americans made it 2-1 and held on for the victory. Canada West's Sean Bonar was selected as the tournament MVP.

== Exhibition schedule ==
Exhibition Results
Game	Team	Score	Team	Score	Notes	Time - Location
Thursday, October 29, 2009
Ex1	Canada West	3	Belarus	2	SO Final - Shots: 49-20 CAN W	19:00 AST - Charlottetown, PEI
Ex2	Canada East	5	MJAHL All-Stars	6	SO Final - Shots: 35-30 CAN E	19:30 AST - Truro, Nova Scotia
Friday, October 30, 2009
Ex3	Belarus	4	MJAHL All-Stars	5	Final - Shots: 33-25 BEL	19:30 AST - Amherst, Nova Scotia
Ex4	Canada East	9	Russia	1	Final - Shots: 44-28 CAN E	19:30 AST - O'Leary, PEI
Ex5	Canada West	2	United States	5	Final - Shots: 30-27 CAN W	20:00 AST - Montague, PEI

== 2009 Tournament ==
=== Group A ===
Pos	Team	Pld	W	OTW	OTL	L	GF	GA	GD	Pts
1	Russia	2	1	1	0	0	5	3	+2	4
2	Canada West	2	1	0	0	1	7	5	+2	2
3	Sweden	2	0	0	1	1	5	9	−4	1

=== Group B ===
Pos	Team	Pld	W	OTW	OTL	L	GF	GA	GD	Pts
1	Canada East	2	1	1	0	0	12	9	+3	4
2	United States	2	1	0	1	0	10	6	+4	3
3	Belarus	2	0	0	0	2	6	13	−7	0

=== Results ===
Round Robin Results
Game	Pool	Team	Score	Team	Score	Notes	Time - Location
Sunday, November 1, 2009
1	A	Russia	2	Canada West	1	Final - Shots: 33-20 CAN W	14:00 AST - Summerside, PEI
2	B	Canada East	5	United States	4	SO Final - Shots: 33-19 USA	19:00 AST - Summerside, PEI
Monday, November 2, 2009
3	A	Sweden	2	Russia	3	SO Final - Shots: 36-27 SWE	14:00 AST - Summerside, PEI
4	B	Belarus	5	Canada East	7	Final - Shots: 27-18 BEL	19:00 AST - Summerside, PEI
Tuesday, November 3, 2009
5	A	Canada West	6	Sweden	3	Final - Shots: 36-19 SWE	14:00 AST - Summerside, PEI
6	B	United States	6	Belarus	1	Final - Shots: 37-26 USA	19:00 AST - Summerside, PEI

=== Championship Round ===
Championship Results
Game	Round	Team	Score	Team	Score	Notes	Time - Location
Thursday, November 5, 2009
7	Quarter	Sweden	1	United States	3	Final - Shots: 36-29 USA	14:00 AST - Summerside, PEI
8	Quarter	Belarus	3	Canada West	7	Final - Shots: 34-22 CAN W	19:00 AST - Summerside, PEI
Friday, November 6, 2009
9	Semi	United States	6	Russia	3	Final - Shots: 38-16 USA	14:00 MST - Summerside, PEI
10	Semi	Canada West	9	Canada East	1	Final - Shots: 43-33 CAN W	19:00 MST - Summerside, PEI
Saturday, November 7, 2009
11	5th Plc.	Sweden	3	Belarus	5	Final - Shots: 30-29 BEL	19:00 AST - Summerside, PEI
Sunday, November 8, 2009
12	Bronze	Russia	6	Canada East	2	Final - Shots: 37-28 RUS	12:00 AST - Summerside, PEI
13	Gold	United States	2	Canada West	1	Final - Shots: 36-29 USA	17:00 AST - Summerside, PEI

=== Final standings ===
	Team
1st place, gold medalist(s)	United States
2nd place, silver medalist(s)	Canada West
3rd place, bronze medalist(s)	Russia
4th	Canada East
5th	Belarus
6th	Sweden

== Statistics ==
=== Scorers ===
Scoring Leaders
Player	Team	GP	G	A	P	PIM
(Canada) Cody Kunyk	Canada West	5	5	5	10	0
(Canada) Connor Jones	Canada West	5	4	6	10	12
(United States) Shane Berschbach	United States	5	5	3	8	2
(United States) Matt Leitner	United States	5	1	6	7	2
(Canada) Cam Reid	Canada West	5	4	2	6	12
(Russia) Sergey Barbashev	Russia	4	3	3	6	0
(Canada) Kellen Jones	Canada West	5	3	3	6	4
(Belarus) Siarhei Drozd	Belarus	4	4	1	5	2
(Canada) Mathew Bodie	Canada West	5	2	3	5	2
(United States) Colten St. Clair	United States	5	2	3	5	0

=== Goaltenders ===
Leading goaltenders
Player	Team	GP	Mins	GA	SO	GAA	Sv%	Record
(United States) Eric Mihalik	United States	4	240	6	0	1.50	0.940	4-0-0
(Russia) Kirill Brashkin	Russia	2	125	4	0	1.92	0.938	2-0-0
(Canada) Sean Bonar	Canada West	5	298	11	0	2.21	0.925	3-2-0
(Sweden) Jonas Gunnarsson	Sweden	3	185	9	0	2.92	0.904	0-3-0
(Russia) Sergey Kostenko	Russia	2	120	7	0	3.50	0.901	1-1-0

== Awards ==
Most Valuable Player: Sean Bonar (Canada West)

All-Star Team

Forwards: Shane Berschbach (United States), Connor Jones (Canada West), Cody Kunyk (Canada West)
Defense: Mac Bennett (United States), Wes McLeod (Canada West)
Goalie: Sean Bonar (Canada West)

== Rosters ==
=== Belarus ===
(Belarus) Players: Stanislau Artynski, Siarhei Bahaleisha, Aliaksandr Baradulia, Valeri Bojarskih, Kiryl Brykun, Siarhei Drozd, Dzianis Hrybko, Allaksandr Kachan, Siahei Karolik, Mikhail Kharamanda, Viacheslau Makritski, Siarhei Maliauka, Raman Malinouski, Evgeniy Nagachev, Viachaslau Raitsou, Nikita Remezov, Aliaksei Sardovik, Siarhei Sheleh, Ilya Silik, Aliaksandr Siomachkin, Dzmitry Volkau, Kanstantin Zholudzeu.

Staff: Dzmitry Sapun, Pavel Halavatski, Nokolai Averin, Allaksandr Yakimets.

=== Canada East ===
(Canada) Players: Nick Avgerinos, Simon Bessette, Andrew Calof, Colin Campbell, Greg Carey, Scott Dawson, Matt Ginn, Sacha Guimond, Alex Guptill, Brock Higgs, Sean Hoyt, Kyle Just, Jacob Laliberté, Lucas Lessio, Jonathon Milley, Jordan Mustard, David Pratt, Ben Reinhardt, David Roy, Jordan Ruby, Jeff Vanderlugt, Tyler Wilson.

Staff: Todd Gill, James Richmond, Patrice Bosch, Troy Ryan, Marty Abrams, Lawrence McKinnon, Carter Walsh, Ralph Manning, Jack Ferguson.

=== Canada West ===
(Canada) Players: Mathew Bodie, Sean Bonar, Clarke Breitkreuz, Kyle Breukelman, Daniel Carr, John Dunbar, Lee Christensen, Madison Dias, Grayson Downing, Tanner Fritz, Curtis Gedig, Kirby Halcrow, Connor Jones, Kellen Jones, Cody Kunyk, Joey Laleggia, Ryan Marshall, Wes McLeod, Brendan O'Donnell, Dustin Pearson, Cam Reid, Peter Stoykewych.

Staff: Rylan Ferster, Barry Butler, Larry Wintoneak, Jomar Cruz, Leonard Strandberg, Harley Palmer, Bill Marr.

=== Russia ===
(Russia) Players: Artur Amirov, Viktor Antipin, Daniil Apalkov, Zakhar Arzamastsev, Sergey Barbashev, Kirill Brashkin, Emil Galimov, Ivan Gavrilenko, Efim Gurkin, Nikita Gusev, Ildar Isangulov, Vladislav Kartaev, Sergey Kostenko, Ivan Krasnov, Jan Krasovskiy, Pavel Kulikov, Alexander Kuznetsov, Nikita Lukin, Roman Lyubimov, Alexey Marchenko, Vladislav Namestnikov, Pavel Suchkov, Maxim Tomkin, Nail Yakupov, Ignat Zemchenko, Seman Zherebtsov, Vitaly Zotov, Gleb Zyryanov.

Staff: Mikhail Vasiliev, Viktor Krutov, Vladimir Koluzganov, Vladimir Myshkin, Boris Dlugach, Alexander Berdinskikh, Sergey Fedotov, Boris Sapronenkov, Alexey Zharov, Sergey Boroday.

=== Sweden ===
(Sweden) Players: Johan Alm, Adam Almquist, Nils Andersson, Victor Berglind, Mattias Bäckman, Sebastian Dyk, Jesper Fast, Mattias Franzén, Petter Granberg, Jonas Gunnarsson, Jonathan Johansson, Karl Johansson, Calle Järnkrok, Johan Larsson, Patrik Nemeth, Joakim Nordström, Sebastian Ottosson, Adam Pettersson, Ludvig Rensfeldt, Johan Sundström, Fredric Weigel, Oskar Östlund.

Staff: Stephan Lundh, Björn Liljander, Jonas Fransson, Krister Holm, Jan Johansson, Fredrik Carls, Lars Nygren.

=== United States ===
(United States) Players: Kevin Albers, Beau Bennett, Mac Bennett, Shane Berschbach, Connor Brickley, Jeff Costello, Chris Crane, Derek DeBlois, Nic Dowd, David Gerths, Kevin Gravel, Nick Jensen, Matt Leitner, Kevin Lind, Eric Mihalik, Nick Mattson, Eamonn McDermott, John Parker, Mike Parks, Nick Sorkin, Colten St. Clair, Willie Yanakeff.

Staff: Mark Carlson, Jeff Blashill, Adam Jones, Darrin Flinchem.
