= Tompkins Township =

Tompkins Township may refer to the following places in the United States:

- Tompkins Township, Warren County, Illinois
- Tompkins Township, Jackson County, Michigan

See also

- Tompkins (disambiguation)
