= Betty Tompkins =

American painter

- Born: 1945 (age 80–81); Washington, D.C., U.S.
- Education: Syracuse University; Central Washington State College
- Known for: Painting
- Movement: Photorealism, feminist art
- Awards: Anonymous Was A Woman Award; 2018

Betty Tompkins (born 1945) is an American artist and arts educator. Her paintings revolve, almost exclusively, around photorealistic, close-up imagery of both heterosexual and homosexual intimate acts. She creates large-scale, monochromatic canvases and works on paper of singular or multiple figures engaged in sexual acts, executed with successive layers of spray painting over pre-drawings formed by text.

Alongside artists such as Carolee Schneemann, Yoko Ono, Valie Export, Joan Semmel, Lynda Benglis and Judy Chicago, Tompkins has been re-assessed as a pioneer of Feminist art. She is listed in The Brooklyn Museum's Elizabeth A. Sackler Center for Feminist Art's Feminist Art Base.

== Early life and education ==
Tompkins was born in 1945 in Washington, D.C. and grew up in Philadelphia, Pennsylvania.

She received her B.F.A. degree from Syracuse University in the 1960s. She took a teaching job at Central Washington State College in Ellensburg, Washington shortly after marrying her first husband, Don Tompkins, who was one of her instructors at Syracuse University. She completed her graduate degree at Central Washington State College, traveling between Ellensburg and New York City.

== Career ==
At the time of their marriage, Don Tompkins had a collection of pornography had ordered from Asia in order to avoid US obscenity laws in the 1950s. These images influenced Betty's first body of work, Fuck Paintings.

In 2002, Jerry Saltz shared an image of one of Tompkins' Fuck Paintings with gallery owner Michell Algus, who offered her a solo exhibition in his New York City gallery. It was Tompkins first solo exhibition in almost 15 years, and helped restart her art career. She was invited to the 7th Biennale d'Art Contemporain de Lyon in 2003, and a year later the Centre Pompidou purchased one of her works for their permanent collection.

In 2019, Tompkins had her Instagram account deleted after she posted a photo of her Fuck Painting #1. A few months later in 2019, Instagram held a closed meeting to discuss censorship, art, and nudity on their software platform. Some artists joined the meeting, including Micol Hebron, Marilyn Minter, Joanne Leah, and Siddhant Talwar. Tompkins was unable to attend the meeting but shared a written statement.

In 2018, she was the recipient of an Anonymous Was a Woman Award.

== Work ==
Fuck Paintings (1969–1974, 2003–present)

Tompkins first major body of work was a series of paintings depicting a male and female figure engaging in sexual intercourse. She elected to render the images in extreme close-up, using vintage pornography stills as her source material. Rather than idealizing the act of fornication by having one body or the other exude dominance or beauty above the other, she equalizes the figures by showing only their genitalia, in congress. The works were produced using hundreds of layers of spray paint, using a finely-calibrated airbrush to build from underdrawing to final image. These early works were made solely with black and white pigments, with extremely high contrasting tonality.

Since returning to the series in 2003, Tompkins uses a base color combination to produce a more illuminated monochrome. She originally gave the series the more modest name Joined Forms, then later called the series Fuck Paintings. Within this first series, until 1976, Tompkins produced a sub-set of works entitled Cow Cunt Paintings.

Censored Grids (1974–present)

In 1974, Tompkins was scheduled to show her work in Paris. When her art arrived, French customs officials seized it, declaring it obscene and unfit for public exhibition. It took Tompkins nearly a year to arrange its return, at great financial and emotional cost to her. In response to the ordeal, Tompkins began making paintings in the form of grids, where a set of white blocks with the word "censored" at the center blocked out all traces of genitalia or primary imagery in the composition. Tompkins said she would continue to make these paintings, as there was seemingly no end to government censorship of visual art.

WOMEN Words (2002 and 2013)

In 2002 and 2013, Tompkins circulated the following email: “I am considering doing another series of pieces using images of women comprised of words. I would appreciate your help in developing the vocabulary. Please send me a list of words that describe women. They can be affectionate (honey), pejorative (bitch), slang, descriptive, etc. The words don’t have to be in English but I need as accurate a translation as possible. Many, many thanks, Betty Tompkins.” Over 3,500 words and phrases were submitted in seven languages, equally split between men and women. In 2012, Tompkins was invited to create a performance in Vienna where 500 of the words and phrases were read aloud. Inspired by that performance, the artist then set out to create 1,000 individual word paintings, intending the series to be presented en masse once complete. On January 1, 2013, Tompkins created the first painting SLUT (#1). In an interview with Art in America, Tompkins says, "People sent stories, too. They made comments. It was very personal. But the same four words were the most popular. Actually nothing has changed."

== Public museum collections ==
Tompkins work is held in many public museum collections, including:

- Fuck Painting #1 (1969), Centre Georges Pompidou, Paris, France
- Fuck Painting #6 (1973), Brooklyn Museum, Brooklyn, United States
- Ayrshire Class D (1979), Allen Memorial Art Museum, Oberlin, Ohio, United States
- Oberlin College, (Oberlin, Ohio)
- Paterson Museum, (Paterson, New Jersey)
- Museum of the City of New York, (New York City)
- Southern Alleghenies Museum of Art (Pennsylvania)
- Stamford Museum & Nature Center, (Stamford, Connecticut)

== Exhibitions ==
Tompkins work has been in many exhibitions, this is a select list:

Exhibitions
Year	Name	Type	Location	Notes
2016	Sex Works/ WOMEN Words, Phrases, and Stories	Group exhibition	Gavlak Gallery, Los Angeles, California and Palm Beach, Florida	
2016	The Female Gaze, Part Two: Women Look at Men	Group exhibition	Cheim & Read, New York City, New York	
2016	WOMEN Words, Phrases, and Stories: 1,000 Paintings By Betty Tompkins	Group exhibition	FLAG Art Foundation, New York City, New York	
2016	Black Sheep Feminism: The Art of Sexual Politics	Group exhibition	Dallas Contemporary, Dallas, Texas	curated by Alison Gingeras
2015	REAL ERSATZ	Group exhibition	Bruce High Quality Foundation (BHQFU), New York City, New York	
2014	Betty Tompkins: Smooch, 55 Gansevoort	Solo exhibition	55 Gansevoort, New York City, New York	
2014	CORPUS	Group exhibition	Zachęta National Gallery of Art, Warsaw, Poland	curated by Maria Brewińska in collaboration with Katarzyna Stupnicka
2014	Inaugural Exhibition	Group exhibition	Gavlak Gallery, Los Angeles, California	
2009–2011	elles@centrepompidou	Group exhibition	Centre Georges Pompidou, Paris, France	curated by Camille Morineau
2010	Lust and Vice: The 7 Deadly Sins from Dürer to Nauman	Group exhibition	Zentrum Paul Klee and the Museum of Fine Arts Bern, Bern, Switzerland	
2009	Naked!	Group exhibition	Paul Kasmin Gallery, New York City, New York	curated by Adrian Danatt and Paul Kasmin
2007	La Plaisser au Dessin	Group exhibition	Musée des Beaux-Arts de Lyon, Lyon, France	
2006	Uncertain States of America	Group exhibition	Serpentine Galleries, London, England	collaboration with Trisha Donnelly, Adam Putnam, and Shannon Ebner
2004	Acquisitions Récentes: Oeuvres contemporaines	Group exhibition	Centre Georges Pompidou, Paris, France	
2003	Biennale de Lyon 2003, "C'est Arrive Demain"	Group exhibition	7 Biennale d'Art Contemporain de Lyon	curated by Bob Nickas.
2002	Manhattan Skylines	Group exhibition	Museum of the City of New York, New York City, New York	
2002		Solo exhibition	Mitchell Algus Gallery, New York City, New York	her first solo show in almost 15 years.
1992	The Living Object: The Art Collection of Ellen H. Johnson,	Group exhibition	Allen Memorial Art Museum, Oberlin, Ohio	
1986–1987	25 Years of Feminism (Year 16)	Group exhibition	Institute for Women and Art (The Mary H. Dana Women Artists Series) at Rutgers University, New Jersey	
