= Suchkov =

Suchkov (Russian: Сучков, from сучок meaning wood knot) is a Russian masculine surname, its feminine counterpart is Suchkova. It may refer to

- Aleksandr Suchkov (born 1980), Russian football player
- Alexei Soutchkov (born 1966), Russian pianist
- Alyaksey Suchkow (born 1981), Belarusian football midfielder
- Gennady Suchkov (1947-2013), Russian naval officer
- Ivan Suchkov (1923-1981), Soviet flight instructor and fighter pilot
- Pavel Suchkov (born 1992), Russian ice hockey goaltender
