= Tompkin =

Tompkin is a surname. Notable people with the surname include:

- Maurice Tompkin (1919–1956), English cricketer and footballer
- Percy Tompkin (1894–1950), English footballer

== See also ==
- Tomkin
- Tompkins (disambiguation)
