= Tompkins =

Tompkins may refer to:

== Places ==
- Tompkins, New York, USA
- Tompkins County, New York, USA
- Tompkins Township, Warren County, Illinois, USA
- Tompkins Township, Jackson County, Michigan, USA
- Tompkins, Saskatchewan, Canada
- Tompkins, Newfoundland and Labrador, Canada
- Tompkins Square Park, New York City

== Other uses ==
- Tompkins (surname), including a list of people with the name

== See also ==
- Tompkins Table, an annual ranking of Colleges of the University of Cambridge
- Tompkin, a surname
- Tomkins (disambiguation)
- Justice Tompkins (disambiguation)
