= Leisure sickness =

Purported psychological condition

Leisure sickness, similar to paradise syndrome, is the name given to a purported psychological condition, not universally recognized by psychologists, by which some people (typically characterized as workaholics) develop symptoms of sickness during the weekends and/or during vacations. The syndrome is similar to paradise syndrome, in which the patient suffers a feeling of dissatisfaction despite having achieved all their dreams.

== Study ==
This phrase was coined by Dutch psychologists Ad Vingerhoets and Maaike van Huijgevoort, who presented a paper titled "Leisure sickness: An explorative study" at a meeting of the American Psychosomatic Society on March 7, 2001. In 2002, Vingerhoets, van Huijgevoort and Van Heck published an article in "Psychotherapy and Psychosomatics" which present the pilot study on leisure sickness and its prevalence, phenomenology, and background.

Symptoms include headaches (even migraines), fatigue, muscular aches and pains and nausea. In relation to vacations, viral infections and illnesses such as colds and flus were often reported. Around 3% of the participants in this study attributed their condition to difficulties with the transition from work to non-work, to stress associated with travel and vacation, as well as workload and personality characteristics.

== Medical history ==
Ad Vingerhoets (* 1953), Em. professor of clinical health psychology at Tilburg University (Netherlands), has found that this problem is caused by stress and a difficulty to switch from work to leisure activities.

Ester Sternberg, a researcher of neuroendocrine immunology at the National Institutes of Health, blames this condition on hormones and stress as they affect the nervous system and immune system.

== See also ==
- Maslow's hierarchy of needs
- Vingerhoets, A. J. J. M., van Huijgevoort, M., & van Heck, G. L. (2002). Leisure Sickness: A pilot study on its Prevalence, Phenomenology, and Background. Psychotherapy and Psychosomatics, 71(6), 311-317. Link to publication; Original and archived copy.
