= Tomkins =

Tomkins may refer to:

- Tomkins (surname)
- Tomkins plc, an engineering company
- Tomkins Cove, New York, a hamlet in the United States
- Tomkins Knob, a mountain in North Carolina, United States
- Tomkins Medal, an Australian rules football award
- McCallum–Tomkins Medal, an Australian rules football award
- Tomkins incident a 2004 attack on Aboriginal boys in Australia

== See also ==
- Tomkin (disambiguation)
- Tompkins (disambiguation)
