= Artur Amirov =

Russian ice hockey player (born 1992)

- Born: April 3, 1992 (age 32); Almetyevsk, Russia
- Height: 5 ft 10 in (178 cm)
- Weight: 161 lb (73 kg; 11 st 7 lb)
- Position: Defence
- Shoots: Left
- KHL team Former teams: Metallurg Novokuznetsk; Lokomotiv Yaroslavl; Neftekhimik Nizhnekamsk
- Playing career: 2009–present

Medal record

Ice hockey

Representing Russia

World Junior A Challenge
Bronze medal – third place	2009 Summerside	

Artur Amirov (born April 3, 1992) is a Russian professional ice hockey player who currently plays for Metallurg Novokuznetsk in the Kontinental Hockey League (KHL).

Amirov made his Kontinental Hockey League (KHL) debut playing with Lokomotiv Yaroslavl during the 2010–11 KHL season.
