= Micol Hebron =

American artist

- Born: July 23, 1972 (age 54)
- Education: University of California, San Diego, Accademia di Belle Arti di Venezia, University of California, Los Angeles
- Known for: Gallery Tally
- Style: Multidisciplinary Artist
- Website: micolhebron.com

Micol Hebron (born July 23, 1972) is an American interdisciplinary artist, curator, and associate professor at Chapman University, located in Southern California. Hebron critically examines and employs modes of feminist activism in art.

== Early life and education ==
Hebron studied theater and visual arts at the University of California, San Diego from 1990 to 1992; and the Accademia di Belle Arti di Venezia, Venice, Italy, from 1993 to 1994. She went on to graduate summa cum laude from the University of California, Los Angeles (UCLA) with a Bachelor of Arts in fine art in 1995. In 2000, she graduated from the UCLA with a Masters of Fine Arts in new genres and contemporary art history.

== Work ==
In 2013 Hebron launched Gallery Tally, a collaborative art project in which people around the world were tracking women's representation in art galleries and creating posters for exhibition. In 2014, the (en)Gendered (in)Equity: The Gallery Tally Poster Project discovered that in Los Angeles and New York galleries, roughly 70% of gallery representation was of male artists.

In order to protest the Instagram social network's nipple policy and social media sexism, in 2014 Hebron created an "Acceptable Male Nipple Template". The template consisted of the visual image of a male nipple that could be photoshopped on to an image of a woman's breast or elsewhere, reminiscent of a pastie. As a result of her nipple project, the template went viral and Hebron has been suspended from Facebook multiple times.

In October 2019, Instagram held a closed meeting to discuss censorship, art, and nudity on their software platform, a few artists joined the meeting including Micol Hebron, Marilyn Minter, Joanne Leah, Siddhant Talwar and Betty Tompkins (via written statement). After this meeting, Hebron's Instagram account was immediately shut down because she attempted to post a topless selfie from outside the meeting location.

== See also ==
- Feminist art movement in the United States
