= Cody Kunyk =

Canadian ice hockey player (born 1990)

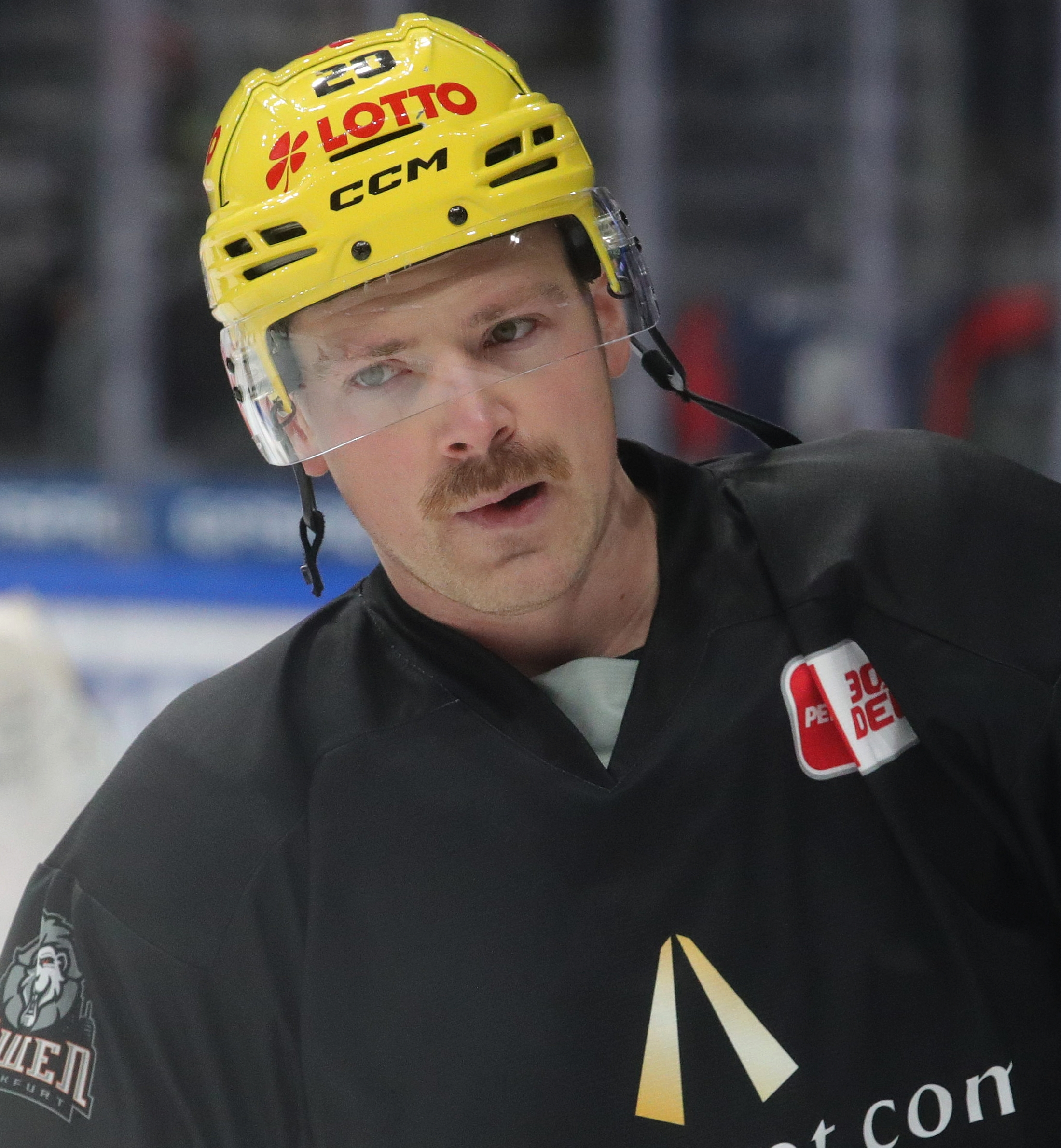
- Kunyk in 2023
- Born: May 20, 1990 (age 36) Sherwood Park, Alberta, Canada
- Height: 5 ft 11 in (180 cm)
- Weight: 194 lb (88 kg; 13 st 12 lb)
- Position: Right wing
- Shoots: Left
- DEL team Former teams: Augsburger Panther; Tampa Bay Lightning; Gentofte Stars; SaiPa; HPK; Oulun Kärpät; Barys Nur-Sultan; Löwen Frankfurt
- NHL draft: Undrafted
- Playing career: 2014–present

Medal record

Ice hockey

Representing Canada West

World Junior A Challenge
Silver medal – second place	2009 Summerside	

Cody Kunyk (born May 20, 1990) is a Canadian ice hockey forward currently under contract to Augsburger Panther of the Deutsche Eishockey Liga (DEL). He has formerly played with the Tampa Bay Lightning of the National Hockey League. (NHL)

== Playing career ==
Kunyk played collegiate hockey for the Alaska Nanooks in the NCAA Men's Division I Western Collegiate Hockey Association (WCHA). In his senior year, Kunyk's outstanding play was rewarded when he was chosen as the WCHA Player of the Year and was named to the 2013–14 All-WCHA First Team.

On April 13, 2014, Kunyk made his NHL debut with the Tampa Bay Lightning in a 1–0 shootout win against the Washington Capitals.

As a free agent from the Lightning after the completion of his entry-level contract, Kunyk signed a one-year deal with German-based club, Grizzlys Wolfsburg of the DEL on August 18, 2015. After training and competing in four pre-season games with Wolfsburg, Kunyk was released from his contract unable to reach the expectations of play on September 6, 2015. Kunyk later signed with Danish club, Gentofte Stars of the Metal Ligaen for the 2015–16 season. Kunyk made an immediate impact with the Stars and in 27 games, placed second in team scoring with 13 goals and 29 points.

In the following off-season, Kunyk returned to North America as a free agent, securing a one-year AHL contract with the Utica Comets, an affiliate to the Vancouver Canucks on July 25, 2016. Kunyk responded to his return to the AHL with a career year offensively in posting 15 goals and 37 points in 61 games.

As a free agent, Kunyk opted to return overseas in signing a one-year deal with top flight Finnish club, SaiPa of the Liiga on September 5, 2017.

Following a lone season in the Kontinental Hockey League with Kazakh club, Barys Nur-Sultan, in 2021–22, Kunyk returned to former club, Oulun Kärpät of the Finnish Liiga on a one-year contract on July 20, 2022.

In the 2023–24 season, Kunyk moved to Germany and signed a one-year contract with Löwen Frankfurt of the DEL on June 16, 2023.

== Career statistics ==
			Regular season					Playoffs
Season	Team	League	GP	G	A	Pts	PIM	GP	G	A	Pts	PIM
2003–04	Sherwood Park Flyers	AMBHL	31	16	20	36	19	—	—	—	—	—
2004–05	Sherwood Park Flyers	AMBHL	39	16	15	31	46	—	—	—	—	—
2005–06	Sherwood Park Monarchs	REMHL	32	21	37	58	26	—	—	—	—	—
2006–07	Sherwood Park Kings	AMHL	35	16	16	32	58	8	0	6	6	22
2006–07	Sherwood Park Crusaders	AJHL	2	0	0	0	2	—	—	—	—	—
2007–08	Sherwood Park Crusaders	AJHL	51	13	11	24	34	5	2	3	5	2
2008–09	Sherwood Park Crusaders	AJHL	61	25	33	58	61	10	3	5	8	2
2009–10	Sherwood Park Crusaders	AJHL	51	44	43	87	33	3	0	1	1	2
2010–11	U. of Alaska-Fairbanks	CCHA	38	12	18	30	28	—	—	—	—	—
2011–12	U. of Alaska-Fairbanks	CCHA	36	15	17	32	18	—	—	—	—	—
2012–13	U. of Alaska-Fairbanks	CCHA	37	11	17	28	22	—	—	—	—	—
2013–14	U. of Alaska-Fairbanks	WCHA	37	22	21	43	22	—	—	—	—	—
2013–14	Tampa Bay Lightning	NHL	1	0	0	0	0	—	—	—	—	—
2014–15	Syracuse Crunch	AHL	69	10	16	26	38	2	0	0	0	0
2015–16	Gentofte Stars	DEN	27	13	16	29	10	—	—	—	—	—
2016–17	Alaska Aces	ECHL	2	0	2	2	0	—	—	—	—	—
2016–17	Utica Comets	AHL	61	15	22	37	16	—	—	—	—	—
2017–18	SaiPa	Liiga	51	12	18	30	51	9	2	4	6	39
2018–19	SaiPa	Liiga	55	14	23	37	18	3	0	3	3	2
2019–20	HPK	Liiga	59	10	39	49	18	—	—	—	—	—
2020–21	Oulun Kärpät	Liiga	53	15	27	42	26	5	3	4	7	0
2021–22	Barys Nur-Sultan	KHL	33	5	9	14	10	5	1	3	4	2
2022–23	Oulun Kärpät	Liiga	60	10	23	33	16	3	0	0	0	0
2023–24	Löwen Frankfurt	DEL	52	17	24	41	22	—	—	—	—	—
2024–25	Augsburger Panther	DEL	34	12	10	22	14	—	—	—	—	—
NHL totals			1	0	0	0	0	—	—	—	—	—
Liiga totals			278	61	130	191	129	20	5	11	16	41
KHL totals			33	5	9	14	10	5	1	3	4	2

== Awards and honours ==
Award	Year
All-WCHA First Team	2013–14
WCHA Player of the Year	2013–14
AHCA West Second-Team All-American	2013–14

Awards and achievements
Preceded by Drew LeBlanc	WCHA Player of the Year; 2013–14	Succeeded by Tanner Kero
Preceded by Ryan Walters	WCHA Scoring leader 2013–14	Succeeded by Tanner Kero
