= Ildar Isangulov =

Russian ice hockey player

- Born: May 20, 1992 (age 33) Ufa, Russia
- Height: 6 ft 2 in (188 cm)
- Weight: 227 lb (103 kg; 16 st 3 lb)
- Position: Defence
- Shot: Left
- KHL team Former teams: Salavat Yulaev Ufa; Toros Neftekamsk
- National team: Russia
- Playing career: 2008–2018

Ildar Isangulov
Medal record

Ice hockey

Representing Russia

World Junior A Challenge
Bronze medal – third place	2009 Summerside	

Representing Russia

World Junior Championships
Silver medal – second place	2012 Canada	

Ildar Ildusovich Isangulov (Russian: Ильдар Ильдусович Исангулов, Bashkir: Илдар Илдуҫ улы Иҫәнғолов; born May 20, 1992) is a Russian former ice hockey defenceman who played for the Salavat Yulaev Ufa of the Kontinental Hockey League (KHL).

== Playing career ==
In November 2011 participated in the Subway Super Series in the Russia men's national junior ice hockey team.

== Career statistics ==
			Regular season					Playoffs
Season	Team	League	GP	G	A	Pts	PIM	GP	G	A	Pts	PIM
2008–09	Salavat Yulaev Ufa-2	RHL	8	0	0	0	4	—	—	—	—	—
2009–10	Tolpar Ufa	MHL	29	2	3	5	18	9	0	0	0	2
2010–11	Tolpar Ufa	MHL	50	4	18	22	60	12	1	3	4	28
2011–12	Tolpar Ufa	MHL	32	8	12	20	39	—	—	—	—	—
2011–12	Salavat Yulaev Ufa	KHL	10	0	1	1	12	—	—	—	—	—
KHL totals			10	0	1	1	12	—	—	—	—	—

== International statistics ==
Year	Team	Event	Place	GP	G	A	Pts	PIM
2012	Russia	WJC	2nd place, silver medalist(s)	6	0	0	0	6
Junior totals				6	0	2	2	6
