= Alison M. Gingeras =

American curator

Alison M. Gingeras is an American curator and art writer based in New York City and Warsaw. She has held positions at numerous institutions including the Guggenheim Museum, the Musée National d'Art Moderne, Centre Pompidou and the Palazzo Grassi.

When working as curator of contemporary art at the Centre Pompidou in Paris (1999 - 2004), she organized the exhibitions 'Dear Painter, Paint Me: Painting the Figure Since Late Francis Picabia' and 'Daniel Buren Le Musee qui n'existait pas'. She has also created projects with Urs Fischer, Thomas Hirschhorn and Kristin Baker. In 2005, she was a co-curator of Daniel Buren: 'The Eye of the Storm' at the Guggenheim Museum in New York.

Since 2012 he curates for the Oko the art space in New York's East Village.

== Writing ==
As a writer she has contributed to Artforum, and Parkett.

== Criticism ==
Of her exhibition at the Frieze Art Fair in London, "Sex Work: Feminist Art & Radical Politics," Hyperallergic's Zachary Small questioned its politicized intent, writing:

"The curatorial scaffolding created by Alison Gingeras and legitimized by A.I.R. Gallery's inclusion is mere table-dressing for other galleries wanting to exhibit erotic art.... [W]e sense the dilution of feminist rhetoric for commercial ends. The inclusion of Betty Tompkins does not a feminist exhibition make ipso facto — and neither do Penny Slinger, Natalia LL, or even Marilyn Minter. What is Gingeras's goal, with her exhibition title equating these artists to sex workers, beyond mere sensationalism? With the smell of stale champagne and cologne wafting through the galleries, it's extremely hard to digest this deluge of genitalia as anything more than a fetishistic amuse-bouche for the crowds."
