= Tomkins (surname) =

Tomkins is a surname. Notable people with the surname include:

- A. Pearce Tomkins (1875–1937), American farmer, lawyer, and politician
- Adam Tomkins (born 1969), British legal scholar
- Alan Tomkins (1939–2020), American art director
- Calvin Tomkins (1925–2026), American author and art critic
- Edward Tomkins (1915–2007), British diplomat
- Floyd W. Tomkins (1850–1932), Episcopal American deacon
- James Tomkins (MP) (c.1569–1636), English politician
- James Tomkins (rower) (born 1965), Australian rower
- James Tomkins (footballer) (born 1989), English footballer
- Joel Tomkins (born 1987), English rugby player
- John Tomkins (composer) (1586–1638), Welsh-born organist and composer
- Jonathan Kreiss-Tomkins (born 1989), American politician
- Ken Tomkins (1917–1990), Australian politician
- Leslie Tomkins (born 1948), English art director
- Logan Tomkins (born 1992), English rugby player
- Oliver Tomkins (1908–1992), English bishop
- Paddy Tomkins, Scottish police officer
- Richard Tomkins (born 1952), English journalist
- Sam Tomkins (born 1989), English rugby player
- Saskia Tomkins (20th and 21st centuries), British musician and actress
- Silvan Tomkins (1911–1991), American psychologist
- Thomas Tomkins (martyr) (died 1555), English Protestant martyr
- Thomas Tomkins (1572–1656), Welsh composer
- Trevor Tomkins (1941–2022), English jazz drummer
- William Tomkins (17th century), English politician

== See also ==
- Tomkin
- Tompkins (surname)
