= Psychoville =

British television series

- Title card from the second series
- Genre: Sitcom; Black comedy; Mystery; Psychological thriller; Psychological horror
- Created by: Reece Shearsmith; Steve Pemberton
- Written by: Reece Shearsmith; Steve Pemberton
- Directed by: Matt Lipsey
- Starring: Steve Pemberton; Reece Shearsmith; Daniel Kaluuya; Dawn French; Eileen Atkins; Imelda Staunton; Jason Tompkins; Lisa Hammond
- Theme music composer: Joby Talbot
- Country of origin: United Kingdom
- Original language: English
- No. of series: 2
- No. of episodes: 14

Production
- Executive producer: Jon Plowman
- Producer: Justin Davies
- Running time: 30mins

Original release
- Network: BBC Two
- Release: 18 June 2009 – 6 June 2011

Related
- The League of Gentlemen; Inside No. 9

Psychoville is a British psychological horror-thriller black comedy mystery television series created and written by and starring The League of Gentlemen members Reece Shearsmith and Steve Pemberton for the BBC. It debuted on BBC Two on 18 June 2009. Pemberton and Shearsmith each play numerous characters, with Dawn French, Jason Tompkins, Daniel Kaluuya and Eileen Atkins in additional starring roles.

The first series was followed by a Halloween special, broadcast in October 2010, which saw Imelda Staunton and Jason Watkins added to the main cast. The second series was first broadcast on 5 May 2011 and ended on 6 June. Reece Shearsmith has said that there will not be a third series. In February 2020, Shearsmith and Pemberton's follow-up series, Inside No. 9, crossed over with Psychoville and brought back five of the characters for the episode "Death Be Not Proud".

== Premise ==
The series revolves around five different characters from different parts of England. David Sowerbutts (played by Pemberton), is a serial killer-obsessed man-child who still lives with his mother Maureen (Shearsmith). Mr. Jelly (Shearsmith), is an embittered one-handed children's entertainer. Oscar Lomax (Pemberton), is a blind millionaire who collects stuffed toy animals.

Joy Aston (French), is a midwife who treats a practice doll as if it is her real child. Robert Greenspan (Tompkins), is a panto dwarf in love with his Snow White who believes he has the power of telekinesis. All five are connected by a mysterious blackmailer who has sent them a letter each with the message: "I know what you did". The series is named after the title given to The League of Gentlemen when the series was sold to Japan and Korea.

== Plot ==
The series features a diverse set of five characters who live in different parts of England, all of whom have been blackmailed by the same individual (referred to in the credits for episode seven as "Black Gloved Man"), who has given them each a letter with the message "I know what you did…" In the second episode, the blackmailer leaves them a second message that reads, "You killed her".

In the third episode they receive a videotape showing them in an asylum together (several having previously revealed that they had been institutionalised) performing "Close Every Door" from the musical Joseph and the Amazing Technicolor Dreamcoat. It is later disclosed that the institution was called Ravenhill Hospital. In Episodes Five and Six, the characters discover the final message: a key depicting a raven. David's letter also contains the message "I'm waiting...".

Ultimately it's revealed that Joy, Robert, David and Oscar were involved in the death of Nurse Edwina Kenchington (Eileen Atkins), who is the blackmailer's mother. The blackmailer is Dr. Stuart Strachen, a surgeon also known as Mr. Jolly. Jolly blackmailed Jelly whom he blamed most, as he was operating on Jelly's hand (later amputated as the operation went wrong) while Kenchington was dying. David knocked her over and Joy pronounced her dead.

The group started a fire to cover their tracks, but Kenchington woke up and attempted to escape. Oscar, Joy and Robert prevented her from leaving the room she was trapped in but she somehow survived and returns to Ravenhill in the final episode looking for her locket. At the end of the series, Mr Jolly blows up part of the asylum with most of the main characters and Kenchington inside. It is revealed that Robert has the locket.

Series two begins with Mr Jelly, Oscar, and Oscar's assistant Michael, aka "Tealeaf", a slang term for thief, attending the funeral of Mr Jolly. Afterwards, Jelly is given a box of Jolly's props, which turns out to contain Strachen's mobile phone and his ID card at Andrews Nanotech. Posing as Mr Jolly, Mr Jelly discovers that Strachen was using his surgical skills to deal in the black market organ trade, and that Kenchington had an account with a cryogenic storage facility where her late father Ehrlichmann's head was kept frozen.

Meanwhile, Andrews Nanotech has hired police detective Finney to retrieve Kenchington's locket by any means necessary. Robert gives the locket to Debbie for safekeeping. After Robert's death, Debbie gives it away to make-up lady Hattie. Detective Finney tracks down the former Ravenhill patients, and questions then kills Joy, Robert, and Oscar, and attempts to kill Mrs Wren. Oscar's friend the toyshop owner Peter Bishop, deduces that Oscar was killed for his connection to Ravenhill. He enlists Tealeaf's help and they successfully retrieve the locket from Hattie before Finney can get to it.

They contact Mr Jelly, whose own investigations have resulted with him in possession of Ehrlichmann's frozen head. Bishop kills Tealeaf and travels to London with Mr Jelly to sell the locket and head to Grace Andrews. It is revealed that the method for restoring a frozen head to life, worked out by Edwina Kenchington, was microscopically engraved on the links of the locket chain. Using this information, Andrews' team is able to bring Ehrlichmann's head back to life.

The head is subsequently destroyed but the technique has been proven to work. The series ends with the revelation that David Sowerbutts is storing the corpse of his mother Maureen in a bathtub filled with ice, suggesting that she could be resurrected by the same method.

== Web presence ==
Shearsmith and Pemberton collaborated with Rob and Neil Gibbons to produce fictional web content to accompany the show including an interactive treasure hunt. Fake websites and promotional websites were created for many of the characters to allow viewers of the programme to get "an overall Psychoville experience."

A new Psychoville Experience was created for series two, with a new interface and a selection of new fictional websites released after each episode. Viewers were asked to find a number each week and input them into a keypad to unlock a 'secret chamber' at the end of the series. The chamber once opened reveals the revived head of the Nazi Doctor Ehrlichmann (Kenchington's father). Five questions are asked and a certain amount correct gets you a free 'freeze and reanimation ticket' from CG Medistore and andrewsnanotech to print out. The websites were again written by Shearsmith and Pemberton.

- Jelly Parties
- Jolly Parties
- Lomax Commodities
- Best Murders
- Joy's Advice to Young Mums Website
- Goldfish Bowl Productions
- Debbie Hart
- Hoyti Toyti/The Nazi Bay (type 'NAZI' in the valuation booth)
- Robert Greenspan
- Biggins Panto
- Midget Gems
- Murder and Chips
- Ravenhill Hospital
- Sunnyvale Rest Home
- FOCCE (Federation of Clowns and Children's Entertainers)

== Cast ==
The main characters in the first series of Psychoville (left to right): Joy Aston, Oscar Lomax, Mr Jelly (back), Robert Greenspan (front), David Sowerbutts and Maureen Sowerbutts.

=== Principal characters ===
Actor	Character	No. of Episodes	Notes
Reece Shearsmith	Mr Jelly	12	Children's Entertainer
Reece Shearsmith	Maureen Sowerbutts	12	David's mother
Reece Shearsmith	Brian MacMillan	4	"Evil Queen" in Snow White
Reece Shearsmith	Jeremy Goode	6	Obsessive Librarian
Reece Shearsmith	The Silent Singer	6	Appears to Jeremy when something bad is happening
Reece Shearsmith	Phil Walker	1	TV location scout
Reece Shearsmith	John Christie	1	Appears to David in a vision
Steve Pemberton	David Sowerbutts	14	Ex-Ravenhill resident
Steve Pemberton	Oscar Lomax	8	Ex-Ravenhill resident
Steve Pemberton	George Aston	9	Joy's husband
Steve Pemberton	Hattie	5	Shahrouz's blackmailing wife
Steve Pemberton	Judge Pennywise	1	Clown in Mr Jelly's nightmare
Daniel Kaluuya	Michael "Tealeaf" Fry	13	Oscar's home help
Dawn French	Joy Aston	9	Midwife, ex-Ravenhill resident
Jason Tompkins	Robert Greenspan	9	"Blusher" in Snow White, ex-Ravenhill resident
Eileen Atkins	Edwina Kenchington	9	Nurse at Ravenhill Hospital
Imelda Staunton	Grace Andrews	7	Wants Kenchington's locket
Vilma Hollingbery	Claudia Wren	6	Care home resident and Jelly's assistant

=== Supporting cast ===
Actor	Character	No. of Episodes	Notes
Lisa Hammond	Kerry	9	"Sniffy" in Snow White
Daisy Haggard	Debbie Hart	7	"Snow White" in Snow White
Daniel Ings	Kelvin	7	Grace's assistant
Adrian Scarborough	Mr Jolly	6 (Note: Also appears in the Halloween special in stock footage.)	Dr Stuart Strachen
Elyes Gabel	Shahrouz	6	
Elizabeth Berrington	Nicola	5	A nurse, colleague of Joy
Alison Lintott	Chelsea Crabtree	4	Kelly-Su's siamese twin
Debbie Chazen	Kelly-Su Crabtree	4	Chelsea's siamese twin
Stacy Liu	Jennifer	4	Oscar's replacement home help
Christopher Biggins	Himself	4	Director and "Prince Charming" in Snow White
Nick Holder	Bob Dalton	3	Owner of Snappy the Crocodile
Alex Kelly	Karen Dalton	3	Bob's wife
Aaron Smith	Ian Dalton	3	Son of Bob and Karen
Sarah Solemani	Emily	3	Robin's dinner guest, later David's companion
Nicholas Le Prevost	Graham	2	"Murder and Chips" leader
Janet McTeer	Cheryl	2	"Murder and Chips" actress
David Smallbone	Martin Pike	2	"Murder and Chips" actor
David Bamber	Robin	4	"Murder and Chips" actor
Natalie Cassidy	Lorraine	2	"Murder and Chips" actress
Alex Waldmann	Drew Aspinall	1	Broke into Ravenhill as a child
Matthew Fenton	Drew Aspinall	1	Broke into Ravenhill as a child
Daniel Millar	AA Man	1	Tries in vain to fix Mr. Jelly's car
Sam Kisgart (Note: Alias for Mark Gatiss)	Jason Griffin	1	"Murder and Chips" auditionee
George Asprey	John George Haigh	1	Appears to David in a vision
Eric Loren	Albert DeSalvo	1	Appears to David in a vision
Glenn Carter	Jack the Ripper	1	Appears to David in a vision
Huw Edwards	Himself	1	Appears reading news on Joy's TV
Julian Bleach	Doctor/Eddie	1	Appears in the Halloween special
Mark Bonnar	Detective Finney	6	
Jason Watkins	Peter Bishop	5	Owner of "Hoyty-Toyties"

== Production ==
Filming for the series began at locations around London in October 2008, with plans for the show to be broadcast in 2009. In May 2009 it was confirmed that the series would begin on 11 June, although it was later rescheduled to 18 June. In order to promote Psychoville's launch, digital agency Ralph & Co created a customisable viral video, which enabled users to seemingly broadcast their friends' darkest secrets on a digital billboard at London's Piccadilly Circus.

== Episodes ==
=== Series 1 (2009) ===
No.	Title	Original release date	UK viewers (millions)
1	"Episode 1" "Black Mail"	18 June 2009	1.73
The black gloved man sends out his first letters to his five victims declaring, "I know what you did". When he gets his letter, Robert believes it is because he once appeared in porn films and asks for Brian, the actor playing the role of the evil queen in the panto to prevent Debbie, the dim actress playing Snow White from finding out. Mr. Jelly entertains at a child's birthday party and believes that his letter comes from the similarly named act Mr. Jolly. Joy teaches some parents-to-be about giving birth while looking after her own "baby" Freddy. Lomax is offered help from a new social worker whom he names "Tealeaf", who stumbles upon his vast collection of "commodities". David is offered work playing the role of a butler at a murder mystery evening, but when he creates a more realistic murder, he gets fired. When he returns home, Maureen thinks he really did commit murder.
2	"Episode 2" "Lomax"	25 June 2009	1.29
The black gloved man sends a second message to his victims stating, "You killed her". Lomax reveals to Tealeaf that his collection only needs one more item to complete it – Snappy the Crocodile. He tells him how he first found Snappy, but two people, a pair of conjoined twins called the Crabtree sisters got there before him. In exchange for Snappy, he gave them his eyes, hence his blindness. Lomax has now discovered that someone is selling him online and he intends to buy it, but he finds himself in a bidding war with the Crabtree sisters. As they put in even bigger amounts of money, the people selling Snappy withdraw him from sale in the hope of making even more money. Elsewhere, Robert and Debbie go on a date, which is later discovered to be a trick. David and Maureen visit the man who organised the murder mystery evening, Graham. When he tries to call the police, David and Maureen plan to drown Graham in his bath. Graham escapes, but is run over by a bus and killed as he flees. Mr. Jelly visits a school to provide entertainment but discovers Mr. Jolly is already there. Joy meanwhile, steals some blood to give to Freddy.
3	"Episode 3" "Jelly"	2 July 2009	1.30
The black gloved man delivers a video tape to the victims showing them inside a mental hospital. Mr. Jelly decides to visit Mr. Jolly to find out why he has been sending the messages. In a flashback, it is shown that Jolly was originally a doctor, Dr. Stuart Strachen, who operated on Jelly's hand, which had to be amputated. This injury resulted in him having to use hooks which scared the children he is entertaining and thus he becomes less successful. Over time, Dr. Strachen developed an interest in Jelly's work and becomes a children's entertainer himself, becoming even better than Jelly. The two fight in a children's play area and eventually Jelly demands to know why Jolly has been sending the letters. However, it turns out that the "E" in the name of the address is an "O" and the letters were meant to be sent to Jolly. Meanwhile, David and Maureen visit another member of the murder mystery evening who they murder via electrocution. Robert takes out his revenge on Debbie by using his telekinetic powers to knock her unconscious. Lomax and the Crabtree Sisters travel to Dudley in order to buy Snappy the Crocodile, but it has gone missing. Joy's husband George demands that she stop treating Freddy as if he is real, but as he does so, Freddy appears to move of his own free will.
4	"Episode 4" "David and Maureen"	9 July 2009	1.41
David and Maureen kill another member of the murder mystery evening and hide the body in a wooden chest. As they sort out the mess they have caused, it is revealed that David had killed his father by giving him an overdose of sleeping pills, thinking he was helping him because he looked tired. A policeman, Jason Griffin, then visits the scene of the crime and David pretends to be the murder victim while he and Maureen try to bluff their way out of the situation. It is later revealed that Griffin is actually an actor auditioning for a role in the murder mystery evenings. Before Maureen learns this, she tells him that it was her who killed David's father by poisoning him slowly over time, and that David's overdose was the final blow. As Griffin leaves, he tells David about what Maureen said about her committing his father's murder. As David confronts her, Griffin returns to get his coat and discovers the body. As a result, David murders Griffin as well. This episode is a homage to the Alfred Hitchcock film Rope, in that it appears to be shot in one continuous take even though it was actually filmed in two.
5	"Episode 5" "Joy"	16 July 2009	1.31
The black gloved man sends a final message to his victims, by giving them a key depicting a raven with a note saying, "I'm waiting". Joy finds that Freddy has come to life, but Freddy goes on a violent rampage and attempts to kill her. She hides herself in her lavatory, but when she gets out discovers that Freddy has murdered George. She collapses from the shock, but it turns out George was faking his death and that Freddy was being controlled by Joy's co-worker Nicola, with whom George is having an affair. As they leave, Joy wakes up. Elsewhere, Mr. Jolly explains to Mr. Jelly why the blackmail letters are being sent. While he was a doctor, he worked at a mental institution called "Ravenhill Hospital", which was run by a sadistic governess called Nurse Edwina Kenchington who used horrible treatments on the patients, including David, Joy, Robert and Lomax. It was they who killed Kenchington. Meanwhile, Robert visits Debbie in hospital who regains consciousness but is suffering from amnesia, so he tricks her into thinking that they are engaged. David and Maureen visit a wax works to kill another member of the murder mystery troupe, but David is distracted when models of famous serial killers seem to come to life and sing to him, telling him that everything is Maureen's fault. Lomax is tricked by Tealeaf and the Crabtree Sisters who run away with a vast amount of Lomax's money. Tealeaf then telephones the real owner of Snappy the Crocodile – the black gloved man.
6	"Episode 6" "Robert"	23 July 2009	1.08
When the rest of the pantomime cast learn of Robert and Debbie's supposed engagement, another of the dwarfs, Kerry, tries to separate them. As Robert confronts Kerry, she prevents him from escaping and uses some pick axes to attack Debbie. She then reveals that it is her, not Robert, who is telekinetic and demands that he leave Debbie and admit that he loves her. As Robert attempts to escape, the rest of the cast arrive to save Debbie thinking that Robert has gone mad. Brian knocks Robert unconscious and then Kerry drives him to the countryside. Meanwhile, Mr. Jolly tells Mr. Jelly to meet him at Jelly's house as he has important information, but when he arrives he finds Jolly is dead, with his head in a blue plastic bag. He discovers that the murderer is the black gloved man, who attempts to frame Jelly for the crime. Jelly decides his best option is to flee to Ravenhill. Joy takes Freddy to hospital thinking he is ill, but the doctors refuse to treat him. Joy then decides to kidnap Nicola and takes them all to Ravenhill, when she operates a blood transfusion to save Freddy. Tealeaf tricks the Crabtree sisters into giving him their money and makes his way to Ravenhill to collect Snappy. As he does, he is locked in the room containing Snappy by Joy, so he calls Lomax to get him out. Maureen discovers the truth about David's fake murder and takes a drugs overdose. She plans to kill David as well but finds he has left home. While trying to make herself vomit up the pills, she collapses. David is seen walking carrying a blue plastic bag with something head-shaped in it.
7	"Episode 7" "Ravenhill"	30 July 2009	1.45
The blackmail victims all make their way to Ravenhill, except Robert. The car that Kerry is driving runs out of petrol so they walk, finding a cottage. As Robert has some soup while Kerry makes a phone call, he discovers the telephone wire is cut and that Kerry has tricked him. He has also been drugged by the soup, served to him by an old crone. Lomax arrives at Ravenhill where he meets Joy and also finds Tealeaf who gives him Snappy. Lomax then throws Snappy over a cliff, and explains that he was in Ravenhill because he was suffering from paradise syndrome after completing his collection the first time around. As a result, the only way to cure it was to get rid of Snappy. Mr. Jelly also arrives at Ravenhill, where he meets Joy and Lomax. They hear the sound of David singing and make their way to him, but it is in fact the video tape and they are trapped by the black gloved man. David meanwhile visits Kenchington's grave and discovers her coffin is empty. Kenchington is still alive, having not being killed by David and the others. Kenchington shoots David and leaves the graveyard, which is in the Ravenhill grounds. David survives due to the item he is carrying in his blue plastic bag – a melon. The black gloved man reveals himself to be Mr. Jolly (he faked his death and used a fake head), who is actually Kenchington's son. He blames Joy, Lomax, Robert and David for killing her, and Jelly most of all because he was operating on his hand while she died, meaning Jolly was unable to save her. Kenchington then arrives revealing that she is not dead and that she wants to know which one of them stole a locket belonging to her. While a fight breaks out, Jolly reveals that he is wearing a bomb-covered vest as his method of getting his revenge on his mother's murder and he blows up part of the hospital with all of them inside and David outside. The locket is eventually shown to be worn by Robert.

=== Halloween special (2010) ===
No.	Title	Original release date	UK viewers (millions)
8	"Psychoville Halloween Special"	31 October 2010	1.50
Phil, a researcher for the TV series Dale Winton's Overnight Ghost Hunt, goes to Ravenhill Hospital to inspect it for a forthcoming shoot. While there he is haunted by visions which manifest themselves into the form of four stories. The special guest stars included Imelda Staunton, Alex Waldmann and Julian Bleach. It is revealed that at least two of the characters who were assembled for series 1's finale are dead, with a further two in a critical condition.

=== Series 2 (2011) ===
No.	Title	Original release date	UK viewers (millions)
9	"Survivors"	5 May 2011	1.15
The survivors of the explosion at Ravenhill Psychiatric Hospital are reunited to bury one of their number killed in the blast. But there is no rest for the wicked as new mysteries beckon. The survivors of the blast are under surveillance by the mysterious Grace Andrews and her mild-mannered lackey, Kelvin. Meanwhile, Detective Finney starts to question the survivors in an attempt to find out more about Kenchington's return from the dead and her hunt for her missing locket.
10	"Dinner Party"	12 May 2011	0.99
The search for the missing locket continues with the investigation turning to Christopher Biggins for answers. Meanwhile, we find out what happened to Robert and Kerry as we return to the mysterious cottage in the woods.
11	"Hancock"	19 May 2011	0.74
Mr Lomax reveals more about his past and the reason behind his hatred of Tony Hancock. Mr Jelly arrives at one of Mr Jolly's bookings and hopes no one will be able to tell the difference.
12	"Sunnyvale"	26 May 2011	0.66
Desperate measures are called for as Jeremy Goode searches for the missing library book. Mrs Wren is in peril from several parties and only one man can save her. But will he be bothered?
13	"The Hunt"	2 June 2011	0.80
With danger mounting, and few witnesses left, Tealeaf, with the help of Peter Bishop, tries to solve the mystery of the locket. Things however, don't quite go to plan. Elsewhere, once again Jelly becomes Jolly with unexpected results.
14	"Andrews Nanotech"	6 June 2011	0.63
The secrets of the missing locket are finally exposed and the reality of what is at stake is revealed to those who remain.

== Awards ==
Psychoville won the 2009 British Comedy Award for "Best New British TV Comedy" and the 2011 British Comedy Award for "Best Comedy Drama".
