= Nikita Lukin =

Russian ice hockey player

- Born: 17 January 1992 (age 33); Novouralsk, Russia
- Height: 6 ft 2 in (188 cm)
- Weight: 181 lb (82 kg; 12 st 13 lb)
- Position: Forward
- Shoots: Left
- VHL team Former teams: HC Lada Togliatti; HC Dynamo Moscow
- National team: Israel
- NHL draft: Undrafted
- Playing career: 2012–present

Nikita Lukin
Medal record

Ice hockey

Representing Russia

World Junior A Challenge
Bronze medal – third place	2009 Summerside	

Nikita Lukin (born 17 January 1992) is a Russian professional ice hockey forward currently playing for HC Lada Togliatti of the Supreme Hockey League.

Lukin played twelve games with HC Dynamo Moscow of the Kontinental Hockey League (KHL) during the 2012–13 season.
