= Vitaly Zotov =

Russian ice hockey player

- Born: 1 April 1992 (age 33) Saint Petersburg, Russia
- Height: 6 ft 2 in (188 cm)
- Weight: 179 lb (81 kg; 12 st 11 lb)
- Position: Defence
- Shoots: Right
- VHL team Former teams: Rubin Tyumen; Lokomotiv Yaroslavl; Metallurg Novokuznetsk
- NHL draft: Undrafted
- Playing career: 2011–present

Vitaly Zotov
Medal record

Ice hockey

Representing Russia

World Junior A Challenge
Bronze medal – third place	2009 Summerside	

Vitaly Olegovich Zotov (Зотов Виталий Олегович; born 1 April 1992) is a Russian ice hockey defenceman. He is currently playing with Rubin Tyumen of the Supreme Hockey League (VHL).

Zotov previously played in the Kontinental Hockey League for Lokomotiv Yaroslavl in the 2013–14 season and Metallurg Novokuznetsk in the 2014–15 season. In May 2022, he signed a contract with HC Metallurg from Zhlobin (Belarus).
