= McCallum–Tomkins Medal =

Australian rules football honour

The McCallum–Tomkins Medal is an Australian rules football honour awarded annually since 2009 to the fairest and most brilliant player in the South Australian National Football League (SANFL) under-18 competition, as judged by field umpires. The award is a merger of the McCallum Medal, previously awarded for the former SANFL under-17 competition and the Tomkins Medal, previously awarded for the former SANFL under-19 competition.

Year	Name	Club
2009	Luke Bowd	South Adelaide
2010	Christian Calabrese	Sturt
2011	Scott Burnett	Port Adelaide
2012	Ryan Dijksman	West Adelaide
2013	Paul Ventura	Woodville-West Torrens
2014	Jonathon Hayes	North Adelaide
2015	Jack Bollmeyer	Norwood
2016	Dakota Nixon	North Adelaide
2017	Boyd Woodcock	North Adelaide
2018	Kai Pudney	W-WT Eagles
2019	Harrison Magor	North Adelaide
2020	Tom Powell	Sturt
2021	Hugh Stagg	Glenelg
2022	Ben Ridgway	Glenelg
2023	Angus Tully	North Adelaide
2024 TIE	Ben Camporeale	Glenelg
	Phoenix Hargrave	South Adelaide
	Blake Oudshoorn-Bennier	North Adelaide
	Oscar Merrett	Sturt
2025	Jack Cook	Woodville-West Torrens
