= Ivan Gavrilenko =

Russian ice hockey player

- Born: June 5, 1992 (age 33) Magnitogorsk, Russia
- Height: 6 ft 0 in (183 cm)
- Weight: 185 lb (84 kg; 13 st 3 lb)
- Position: Defence
- Shoots: Left
- VHL team Former teams: Yuzhny Ural Orsk; Metallurg Novokuznetsk; HC Sibir Novosibirsk; Admiral Vladivostok
- Playing career: 2012–present

Medal record

Ice hockey

Representing Russia

World Junior A Challenge
Bronze medal – third place	2009 Summerside	

Ivan Gavrilenko (born June 5, 1992) is a Russian professional ice hockey defenceman. He currently plays with Yuzhny Ural Orsk of the Supreme Hockey League (VHL).

Gavrilenko made his Kontinental Hockey League debut playing with Metallurg Novokuznetsk during the 2013–14 KHL season.
