= Shannon Ebner =

American artist

- Born: 1971 (age 54–55)
- Education: Yale University
- Known for: Photography and poetry

Shannon Ebner (born 1971) is an American artist based in Los Angeles. She was born in Englewood, New Jersey. Ebner's artwork takes the form of photographs and poems that question the limits and ambiguity of language.

== Career ==
Ebner received her BA degree from Bard College in 1993. Before she entered Yale University in 1997, she stopped her photographic practice to focus more on her work as a poet. She participated in the St. Mark's Poetry Project in New York and worked for the writer Eileen Myles. Although Ebner is no longer a poet, she takes her inspiration from poems and looks for ways to include poetry within her photographic work. She graduated from Yale in 2000.

From 2010 to 2018, Ebner taught the University of Southern California's Roski School of Art and Design. In 2018 she was named chair of Pratt Institute's photography department.

== Process ==
Ebner takes her photographs in black and white. In an interview with Mousse Magazine, Ebner explained that she believes black and white "means a way of seeing the world that doesn't exist in reality; it's a way of seeing the world that is about difference."

Ebner claims a photographer always has the choice to keep the colour or discard it. This means that the choice between colour and black & white is always an act of discarding the color information of the images. For Ebner, photography is about the lines of action: writing with blank ink on a world that's in shades of grey.

== Themes ==
Portraits

The first well known portrait made by Shannon Ebner is called: Portrait of My Ex-Girlfriend (1998). The picture was taken while she was a graduate student on Yale's MFA program. Ebner placed the picture in a jar of water and left it there while she embarked on a road trip to Nova Scotia where she hoped to meet Robert Frank. When she returned, she took the lid off the jar exposing the blurred picture resulting to be Portrait of My Ex-Girlfriend.

The submerging of photographs in jars filled with water is a method that Ebner kept using during her career. The photograph Paging Walter (2009) was made the same way. Ebner shot a portrait of Walter Benjamin and exposed the picture to the same process: because of the solubility property of water, the photographs emulsion sloughed off, leaving behind a ghostly trace of the original print.

Language

Language is the main subject in the photography of Ebner's career. Her work is an exploration of language and sign systems. "Ebner often takes symbolic or linguistic signifiers and detaches them from their usual contexts. She uses language in unexpected and multi-layered ways, with puns, palindromes and borrowed phrases."

== Public collections ==
Ebner's work is included in the permanent collections of the Whitney Museum of American Art and the Guggenheim Museum, New York.
