= McCallum Medal =

The McCallum Medal (officially called the F. J. McCallum Medal) was an Australian rules football honour awarded from 1947 to 2008 to the fairest and most brilliant player in the South Australian National Football League (SANFL) U/17 competition, as judged by field umpires. It was named after Frederick John McCallum, League life member and past Secretary of the Norwood Football Club. From 1939-1941 the award was known as the O'Halloran Medal, named after Thomas Shuldham O'Halloran KC, a former chairman of the League.

== Winners ==
=== O'Halloran Medal ===
| Year | Name | Club |
|---|---|---|
| 1939 | Ken Logan | North Adelaide (1) |
| 1940 | C. Britton | West Torrens (1) |
| 1941 | Kevin Dale | Sturt (1) |

=== McCallum Medal ===
| Year | Name | Club |
|---|---|---|
| 1947 | Kevin Salvemini | Port Adelaide (1) |
| 1948 | Robert Cocks | West Torrens (2) |
| 1949 | Brian Wharfe | Port Adelaide (2) |
| 1950 | Michael Paech | Sturt (2) |
| 1951 | Jim Wright | West Adelaide (1) |
| 1952 | John Taylor | West Torrens (3) |
| 1953 | Malcolm Westley | North Adelaide (2) |
| 1954 | Graham Clarke | Norwood (1) |
| 1955 | Don Atkinson | North Adelaide (3) |
| 1956 | John Cahill | South Adelaide (1) |
| 1957 | John Machioro | West Torrens (4) |
| 1958 | Warren Foster | South Adelaide (2) |
| 1959 | William Kelly | Woodville (1) |
| 1960 | Lindsay Backman | South Adelaide (3) |
| 1961 | John Long | Glenelg (1) |
| 1962 | Paul Bagshaw | Sturt (3) |
| 1963 | J. Perkins | Woodville (2) |
| 1964 | W. (John) Robinson | North Adelaide (4) |
| 1965 | Dennis Sachse | North Adelaide (5) |
| 1966 | David Burns | North Adelaide (6) |
| 1967 | Mark Coombe | South Adelaide (4) |
| 1968 | Barry Norsworthy | Central District (1) |
| 1969 | Benjamin Rigney | North Adelaide (7) |
| 1970 | Michael Gregg | Norwood (2) |
| 1971 | Neil Craig | Norwood (3) |
| 1972 | Harry Puhle | West Torrens (5) |
| 1973 | Greg Turbill | Norwood (4) |
| 1974 | Phil Heinrich | Sturt (4) |
| 1975 | C. Kirkwood | Port Adelaide (3) |
| 1976 | Randall Wright | Glenelg (3) |
| 1977 | K. Zubrinick | Woodville (3) |
| 1978 | Chris Wright | Port Adelaide (4) |
| 1979 | Brett Mackereth | Sturt (5) |
| 1980 | Greg Thomas | Norwood (5) |
| 1981 | Garry McIntosh | Norwood (6) |
| 1982 | Chris Davies | North Adelaide (8) |
| 1983 | Roger Girdham | Central District (2) |
| 1984 | Andrew Underwood | Sturt (6) |
| 1985 | David Brown | Port Adelaide (5) |
| 1986 | M. (Scott) Peek | Glenelg (3) |
| 1987 | Dean Bonutto | Central District (3) |
| 1988 | Todd Bache | South Adelaide (5) |
| 1989 | Andrew Osborn | South Adelaide (6) |
| 1990 | Troy Bond | Port Adelaide (6) |
| 1991 tied | Shane Bond | Port Adelaide (7) |
| 1991 tied | B. Barry | South Adelaide (7) |
| 1992 | Justin Casserly | Central District (4) |
| 1993 | Sudjai Cook | Norwood (7) |
| 1994 | Nathan Seal | Port Adelaide (8) |
| 1995 | Glenn Noye | Central District (5) |
| 1996 | H. DeBoo | South Adelaide (8) |
| 1997 | Scott Borlace | Norwood (8) |
| 1998 | Dane Rolfe | Norwood (9) |
| 1999 | Sam Breslauer | Norwood (10) |
| 2000 | Wade Harrison | North Adelaide (9) |
| 2001 | Jayce Richardson | Glenelg (4) |
| 2002 | Adam Cooney | West Adelaide (2) |
| 2003 | Ben Eckermann | Sturt (7) |
| 2004 | R. Bennett | West Adelaide (3) |
| 2005 tied | Lindsay Thomas | Port Adelaide Magpies (1) |
| 2005 tied | James Boyd | South Adelaide (9) |
| 2006 | Jack Bampton | Norwood (11) |
| 2007 | Paul Cahill | Sturt (8) |
| 2008 | Brad Robertson | Port Adelaide Magpies (2) |
