= Pavel Suchkov =

Russian ice hockey player

- Born: 21 November 1992 (age 32) Moscow, Russia
- Height: 5 ft 11 in (180 cm)
- Weight: 187 lb (85 kg; 13 st 5 lb)
- Position: Goaltender
- Catches: Left
- KHC team Former teams: Berkut Karagandy; HC Spartak Moscow
- NHL draft: Undrafted
- Playing career: 2011–present

Pavel Suchkov
Medal record

Ice hockey

Representing Russia

World Junior A Challenge
Bronze medal – third place	2009 Summerside	

Pavel Suchkov (born 21 November 1992) is a Russian ice hockey goaltender. He is currently playing with Berkut Karagandy of the Kazakhstan Hockey Championship (KHC).

Suchkov made his Kontinental Hockey League (KHL) debut playing with HC Spartak Moscow during the 2012–13 KHL season.
