= Paradise syndrome =

Psychological condition

Paradise syndrome, while not officially recognized as a mental condition, is a term used by some to refer to a condition in which a person suffers a feeling of dissatisfaction despite having achieved all their dreams. It is often applied to individuals of such great wealth and success that they feel they no longer have anything left in life to accomplish. It is common with people who assign great value to their career and, although they have achieved much, do not feel satisfied.

The phrase may also refer to an episode of Star Trek, "The Paradise Syndrome", and in this instance, deals with being overworked and needing a break, rather than a feeling of dissatisfaction related to achieving one's dreams.

== In popular culture ==
The titular character in the Simon and Garfunkel song "Richard Cory" (based on the Edward Arlington Robinson poem of the same title) epitomizes paradise syndrome.

A major character in the television series Psychoville, Oscar Lomax, suffers from paradise syndrome. The only way for him to be cured usually involves a topsy-turvy game of cat-and-mouse with a stuffed "commodity" (children's toy) which he finds and then deliberately loses.

In the 1997 novel Night Train by Martin Amis, paradise syndrome is proffered as a possible explanation for the suicide of Jennifer Rockwell, a young woman who seemingly had everything: beauty, intelligence, health, a devoted lover and a stimulating career. The investigation of her suicide reveals clues to another explanation that the central character, detective Mike Hoolihan, suspects Jennifer herself may have left as an elaborate decoy.

Agent Smith, a major character in the Matrix franchise of movies, mused about a future humanity's experience with the paradise syndrome during his interrogation of Morpheus in The Matrix.

Agent Smith (viewing the city below): Have you ever stood and stared at it, marveled at its beauty, its genius? Billions of people just living out their lives, oblivious. Did you know that the first Matrix was designed to be a perfect human world. Where none suffered. Where everyone would be happy. It was a disaster. No one would accept the program. Entire crops were lost. Some believed that we lacked the programming language to describe your perfect world. But I believe that as a species, human beings define their reality through misery and suffering. The perfect world was a dream that your primitive cerebrum kept trying to wake up from. Which is why the Matrix was redesigned to this, the peak of your civilization.

In the episode "Time On Our Hands" of the TV series Only Fools and Horses, Del Boy exhibits paradise syndrome after finally becoming a millionaire, when in the closing moments of this episode he throws his snooker cue down and starts trying to convince Rodney they need to make investments with all their riches.
