= Sebastian Dyk =

Swedish ice hockey player

- Born: 24 September 1992 (age 33) Malmö, Sweden
- Height: 6 ft 0 in (183 cm)
- Weight: 187 lb (85 kg; 13 st 5 lb)
- Position: Right wing
- Shoots: Right
- Liiga team Former teams: HIFK; HV71; Malmö Redhawks
- NHL draft: Undrafted
- Playing career: 2010–present

Sebastian Dyk (born 24 September 1992) is a Swedish ice hockey player. He is currently playing with HIFK in the Liiga.
