= Tomkin =

Tomkin is the surname of the following people

- Albert Tomkin (1915–1989), English football player
- Maxim Tomkin (born 1992), Russian ice hockey player
- William Tomkin (1860–1940), English painter

== See also ==
- Tomkins (disambiguation)
- Tomkin Road railway station in Ireland
- Tomkin Tomato (Variety)
