= Joe Tompkins =

American alpine skier

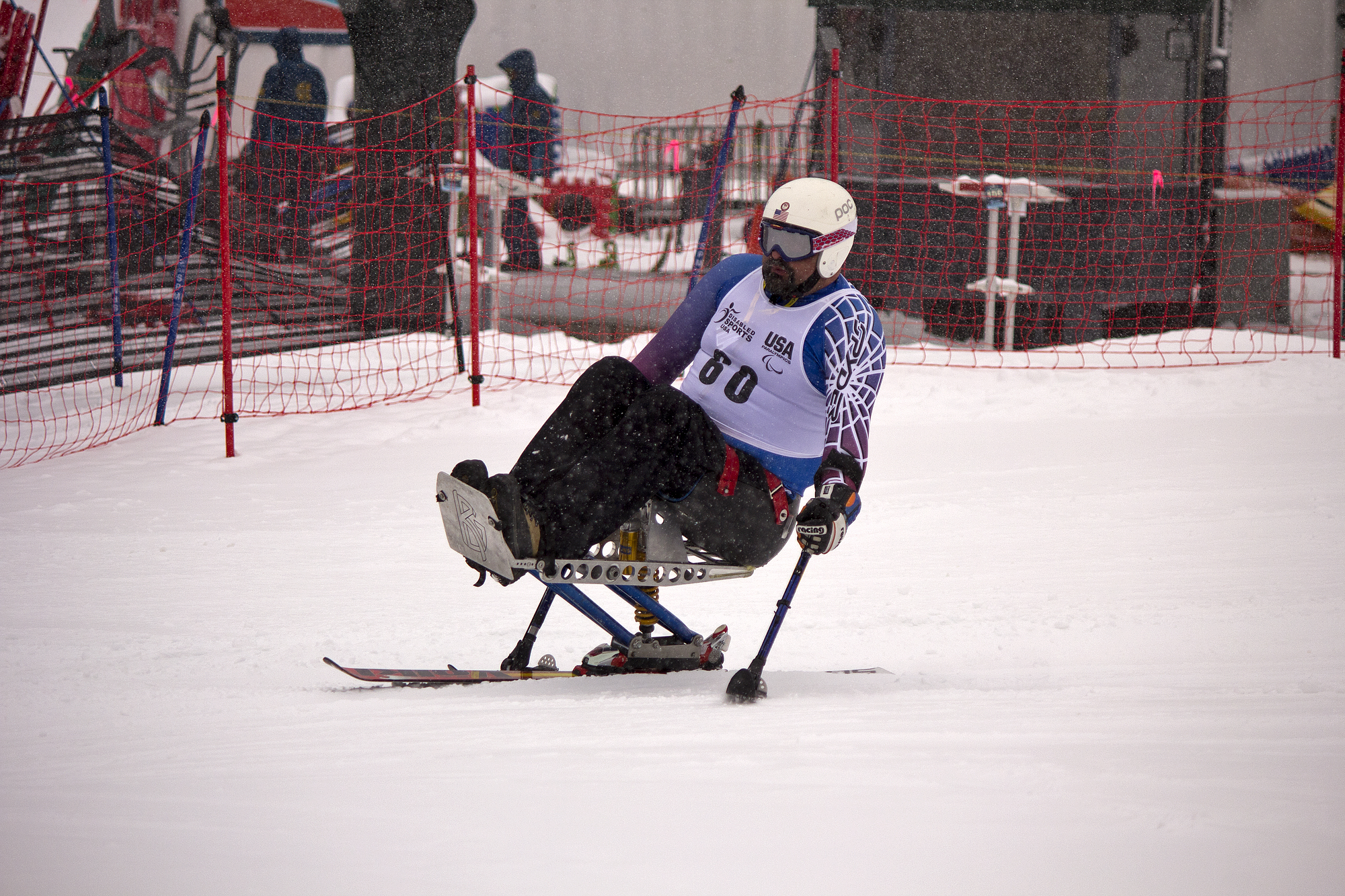
- Tompkins in the Super G in 2012

Personal information
- Born: August 20, 1968 (age 57) Juneau, Alaska, United States

Sport
- Sport: Skiing

Joe Tompkins (born August 20, 1968) is an American professional paralympic alpine skier.

== Early life ==
Joe Tompkins was born on August 20, 1968 in Juneau, Alaska. He was a recreational skier until a car crash left him without the use of his legs. For two years after the accident Joe took up drugs and alcohol, and nearly killed himself. However he stopped after a couple of years and carried on skiing and in January 1989 he started as an arroya sled 'sit skier'. He quickly moved on to monoski in the following years.

== Professional skiing ==
In May 1999 he joined the United States Disabled Alpine Men's Ski Team (USDST). He won the first IPC Disabled Alpine World Cup race in Breckenridge, Colorado in December 1999. In his second season with the USDST he came 6th place in the downhill competition in the world championships. In 2002 he achieved one of his targets by taking part in the Winter Paralympics in Salt Lake City, Utah. He was the top U.S racer in his class. In January 2003, Joe came 2nd in the Huntsman's Cup Super-G race also in Utah. During January 2004, in Wildschönau, Austria, he won the IPC Disabled Alpine World Cup Super-G. In March 2005 Joe finished first in the IPC Disabled Alpine World Cup downhill race in Klosters, Switzerland. In 2006 he took part in the Winter Paralympics in Turin, Italy. He is currently the 5th best mono-skier in the United States and 12th best in the world.

== Life away from skiing ==
Joe has a teenage son. During the summer he coaches a little league baseball team. He is also a motivational speaker and an avid golfer. Joe has taken part in many golf tournaments, including the Undegraff Vision Celebrity Golf Challenge, and has a handicap of 34.

"Joe's an example of everything we want in an athlete, and in a human being. He gives and gives and gives and never asks for anything... I had the most amazing experience playing golf with Joe... The only thing Joe complained about was ... actually, I don't think he complained about anything. Not even the sand traps. Whatta day. It changed my life."

Bob Condron, Director of Media Services – United States Olympic Committee; & Commission Member- International Olympic Committee
