= Fredric Weigel =

Swedish ice hockey player (born 1992)

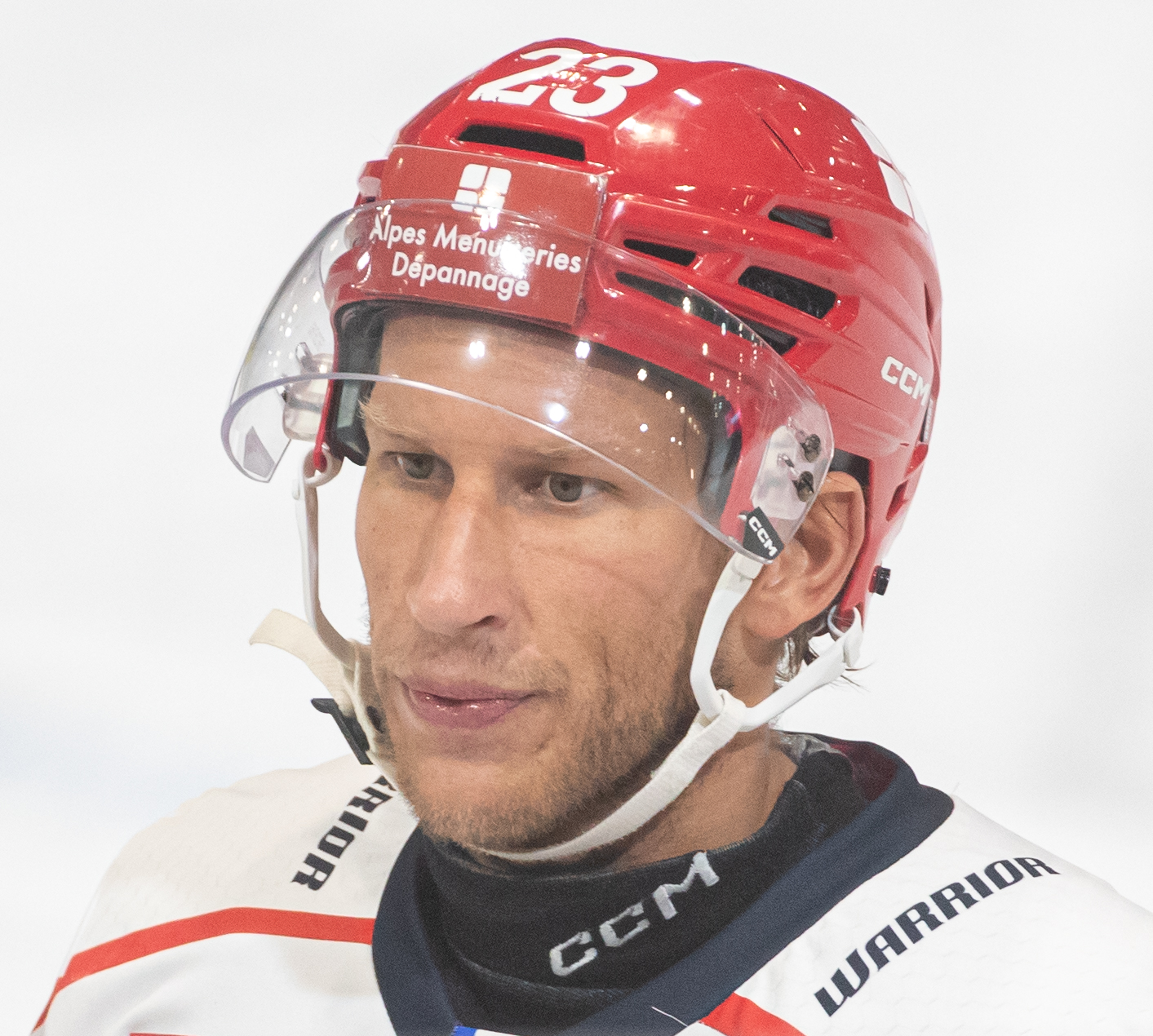
- Weigel in 2025
- Born: April 23, 1992 (age 34) Stockholm, Sweden
- Height: 5 ft 10 in (178 cm)
- Weight: 161 lb (73 kg; 11 st 7 lb)
- Position: Centre
- Shoots: Left
- Magnus team Former teams: Brûleurs de Loups; Djurgårdens IF; Jukurit
- Playing career: 2011–present

Fredric Weigel (born April 23, 1992) is a Swedish professional ice hockey player who currently plays for Brûleurs de Loups in the Ligue Magnus (France). He previously played for the Djurgårdens IF in the then Swedish Elitserien.
