= Maxim Tomkin =

Russian ice hockey player

- Born: 14 March 1992 (age 33); Tashkent, Uzbekistan
- Height: 6 ft 0 in (183 cm)
- Weight: 185 lb (84 kg; 13 st 3 lb)
- Position: Defence
- Shoots: Left
- KHL team (P) Cur. team: HC Dynamo Moscow; Dynamo Balashikha (VHL)
- NHL draft: Undrafted
- Playing career: 2011–present

Maxim Tomkin
Medal record

Ice hockey

Representing Russia

World Junior A Challenge
| Bronze medal – third place | 2009 Summerside | |

Maxim Tomkin (born 14 March 1992) is a Russian professional ice hockey defenceman. He played with HC Dynamo Moscow of the Kontinental Hockey League (KHL) during the 2012–13 season.
