= Justice Tompkins =

Justice Tompkins may refer to:

- Arthur S. Tompkins (1865–1938), justice of the New York Supreme Court
- Daniel D. Tompkins (1774–1825), associate justice of the appellate court that was then called the Supreme Court of New York and later Vice President of the United States
- George Tompkins (1780–1846), associate justice of the Supreme Court of Missouri
- Nathaniel Tompkins (1879–1949), associate justice of the Maine Supreme Judicial Court
