= Gerry Thompkins =

American gridiron football player

Profile
- Position: Quarterback

Personal information
- Born: c. 1937 (age 88–89); Honey Grove, Texas, U.S.
- Listed height: 6 ft 2 in (1.88 m)
- Listed weight: 205 lb (93 kg)

Career history
- 1960: Ottawa Rough Riders
- 1961–1962: Montreal Alouettes

Awards and highlights
- Grey Cup champion (1960)

Gerry Thompkins (born c. 1937) was an American professional football player who played for the Ottawa Rough Riders and Montreal Alouettes. He won the Grey Cup with the Rough Riders in 1960. He played college football at Texas A&M University–Kingsville.
