= Jason Tompkins =

British actor

Jason Tompkins is a British actor from Leicestershire. He is best known for his role as Robert Greenspan, one of the main characters in the dark comedy series Psychoville.

Tompkins portrayed Josef in an episode of Jonathan Creek, titled "The Seer of the Sands". He also played a significant role as Jimmy Freebie, the head of the gangster mob family the 'Freebies' in Phoo Action.

In addition, Tompkins had a notable role as Eugene Prudent, a Union leader in the TV series The 10th Kingdom, and various minor roles in shows such as Casualty, One Foot in the Grave, and Yes Sir, I Can Boogie. He hosted Beat the Cyborgs alongside Mark Speight on CITV.
