= Don Tompkins =

Jewelry artist

Donald Paul Tompkins (1933–1982) is an American jewelry artist known for his witty and satirical works based on objects, photo etchings, cast elements, and gemstones. He is most closely associated with the Pacific Northwest and the metalsmithing community that coalesced around Central Washington University in Ellensburg, Washington, where he taught for many years. His most famous series Commemorative Metals keenly reflected Pop Art and the artistic concerns of New York City-based artists in the 1950s and 60s.

== Early years ==
Don Tompkins was born in Everett, Washington on November 1, 1933, to two teachers. His sister Merrily, who would also go on to become a jewelry artist, was born in 1947. Tompkins studied jewelry at Everett High School in Everett, Washington, where he was a student of the influential metalsmith Russell Day.

In 1952 he married Marilyn Hopkins.

From 1953 to 1954 he took classes with Day at Everett Junior Community College, and also worked as his teaching assistant during that time. Day served as a mentor and supporter of Tompkins' interest in jewelry, providing him with his first set of tools and materials.

With Day's encouragement, Tompkins submitted work to, and was accepted by, the 1954 Northwest Craftsmen's Exhibition. Tompkins' jewelry in the exhibition reflected the Modernist aesthetic of the time which prioritized organic shapes for bracket watches, necklaces, brooches and rings.

That year, Tompkins transferred to the University of Washington, Seattle to study with Ruth Pennington, another influential Pacific Northwest craftswoman. He received his B.A. in Art Education in 1956 and his M.F.A. in Design (metal, jewelry, and sculpture) from Central Washington in 1958.

== Career ==
=== Early career ===
From 1956 to 1957, Tompkins taught crafts at Edmonds High School in Edmonds, Washington followed by a part-time instructor's position in art education at the University of Washington, Seattle from 1957 to 1958. He then returned to Everett Junior College to teach design, jewelry, and drawing from 1958 to 1963 while simultaneously making jewelry and exhibiting in local exhibitions. In 1960, Tompkins attended a summer session of graduate work at the School for American Craftsman in Rochester, New York. Three years later he moved with his family to Syracuse, New York to attend Syracuse University for graduate work in art education. He remained there until 1966, exhibiting his jewelry in the shows American Jewelry Today (1963 and 1967) at the Everhart Museum in Scranton, Pennsylvania and Jewelry 64 at the State University of New York, Plattsburgh.

=== Mid-career ===
In 1966, at the request of Ramona Solberg, a fellow jewelry artist and former student of Ruth Pennington, Tompkins joined the faculty of Central Washington University in Ellensburg, Washington and remained there until 1972. There he taught jewelry, wood, plastics, design, sculpture, art education, and aesthetics. Ellensburg became a center for Funk art and jewelry made from found objects in the Pacific Northwest.

Tompkins's sister Merrily was one of his students during this time, and later students included Ken Cory and Nancy Worden. It was during this period that Tompkins created his most famous series, Commemorative Medals. Made between 1965 and 1975, the series consisted of portraits of contemporary artists, musicians, political and cultural figures, and writers including: Hans Hoffmann, Claes Oldenburg, Norman Mailer, Pablo Picasso, and Henry Miller (1968); Janis Joplin, Minnesota Fats, Martha Mitchell, and Jack Zucker (1971); Jackson Pollock (1972); and Ivan Karp (1974).

Each provided social commentary on the figures through Tompkins's incorporation of found objects and evocative cast silver elements. Pop Art was a large aesthetic influence on these pieces. Tompkins is often credited as being one of the earliest artists to incorporate the style and found objects in American jewelry. The medals were exhibited throughout the 1970s in exhibitions at the Museum of Contemporary Crafts in New York; the World's Fair in Spokane, Washington; the Cranbrook Academy of Art in Bloomfield Hills, Michigan; Barnard Baruch College in New York; Central Washington University in Ellensburg, Washington; and the Xerox Corporation in Rochester, New York.

Tompkins' medals often incorporated photographic images of the subjects, either through his use of newspaper clippings or photo etching. Tompkins often experimented with materials and processes until he became proficient. At other times, he sought out expert advice as he did when he learned photo etching by contacting Eastman-Kodak for assistance.

His use of images was executed in a collage or assemblage tradition, helping to focus the viewer on the person as well as the narrative. Often, Tompkins used these images in a reverential manner but at other times used them to signal loss and pathos, two emotions often seen in jewelry that incorporates photography.

=== Late career ===
Tompkins and his family moved to New York in 1972 when he became assistant professor of art at New York University. He taught sculpture, three-dimensional design, and jewelry there until leaving in 1975 to establish a business called Jewelry Loft in Soho. The business failed and he moved back to the Pacific Northwest. Tompkins made little jewelry between 1976 and his death from a heart attack in Seattle, Washington, in 1982.

== Timeline ==
=== Education ===
1956 B.A. in Art Education, University of Washington, Seattle

1958 M.F.A. in Design, University of Washington, Seattle

1960 Summer graduate work at the School for American Craftsmen, Rochester, New York

1963–66 Graduate work at Syracuse University, Syracuse, New York

1969–72 PhD in education from Teachers College, New York, New York

=== Teaching/Visiting Artist ===
1972–75 Assistant Professor of Art, New York University, New York, New York

1974 Visiting Artist, University of Wisconsin, Eau Claire

1972 Visiting Artist, Tri-Cities Area, Washington D.C.

1970–71 Instructor, Teachers College, New York, New York

1966–72 Associate Professor of Art, Central Washington State College, Ellensburg, Washington

1965 Guest Professor of Art, University of British Columbia (summer)

1963–66 Lecturer in Art, Syracuse University, Syracuse, New York

1958–63 Teacher of Art, Everett Junior College, Everett, Washington

1957–58 Instructor of Art, University of Washington, Seattle

1956–57 Crafts Instructor, Edmonds High School, Edmonds, Washington

=== Selected exhibitions ===
2014: Multiple Exposures: Jewelry and Photography, Museum of Arts and Design, New York

2007–2009: Ornament as Art: Avant-Garde Jewelry in the Helen Williams Drutt Collection, The Museum of Fine Arts, Houston; The Renwick Gallery of the Smithsonian Institution; the Mint Museum of Craft and Design; the Tacoma Museum of Art

2000: Commemorative Medals/Objects: The Politics of History in Honor of the National Republican and Democratic Presidential Conventions, Helen Drutt: Philadelphia

1975: Imagery and Symbolism in Contemporary Jewelry, Central Washington State University, Ellensburg, Washington;
Crafts for the '70s, Barnard Baruch College, New York, New York

1973–74: Portable World, Museum of Contemporary Crafts, New York; World's Fair, Spokane, Washington; Cranbrook Academy of Art, Bloomfield Hills, Michigan

1972: The Late, Late Show Starring Martha Mitchel, Minnesota Fats, and Introducing Jack Zucker Commemorative Medals," Columbia University Teachers College, New York, New York;
Contemporary American Silversmiths and Goldsmiths," Corcoran Gallery, Washington D.C.

1964: Jewelry 64, State University of New York, Plattsburgh

1955: Designer Craftsmen, University of Illinois

==== Museum collections ====
The Museum of Fine Arts, Houston The Philadelphia Museum of Art
