= Tompkins Township, Warren County, Illinois =

Coordinates: 40°50′59″N 90°43′50″W

Tompkins Township
- Township
- Location in Warren County
- Country: United States
- State: Illinois
- County: Warren
- Established: November 8, 1853

Area
  - Total: 36.57 sq mi (94.7 km^{2})
  - Land: 36.53 sq mi (94.6 km^{2})
  - Water: 0.04 sq mi (0.10 km^{2}) 0.11%

Population (2010)
  - Estimate (2016): 901
  - Density: 25.1/sq mi (9.7/km^{2})
- Time zone: UTC-6 (CST)
  - Summer (DST): UTC-5 (CDT)
- FIPS code: 17-187-75692

Tompkins Township is located in Warren County, Illinois, United States. As of the 2010 census, its population was 918 and it contained 403 housing units.

The village of Kirkwood is located in this township.

== Geography ==
According to the 2010 census, the township has a total area of 36.57 square miles (94.7 km^{2}), of which 36.53 square miles (94.6 km^{2}) (or 99.89%) is land and 0.04 square miles (0.10 km^{2}) (or 0.11%) is water.

== Demographics ==
Historical population
Census	Pop.	Note	%±
2016 (est.)	901
U.S. Decennial Census
