= ECHL Leading Scorer Award =

ECHL Leading Scorer
- Sport: Ice hockey
- Awarded for: to the ECHL player who leads the league in scoring at the end of the regular season.

History
- First award: 1989
- First winner: Daryl Harpe, Erie Panthers
- Most wins: Chad Costello, Allen Americans (3)
- Most recent: Brandon Hawkins, Toledo Walleye

The ECHL Leading Scorer Award goes to the ECHL player "who leads the league in scoring at the end of the regular season" and has been awarded since 1989. The award is not named after any individual and has four repeat winners as of 2024: Phil Berger won the award in 1991–92 and 1993–94 as a member of the Greensboro Monarchs, John Spoltore won the award in back-to-back years from 1998–99 to 1999–2000 as a member of the Louisiana IceGators, Chad Costello won in 2014–15, 2015–16, and 2016–17 with the Allen Americans and Brandon Hawkins won in 2023–24 and 2024–25 with the Toledo Walleye. Twin brothers Tyler and Justin Donati are the only brothers to win the award. Tyler Donati won the award in 2009–10 and Justin Donati won the following season. Trevor Jobe, the 1992–93 award winner, is the current record holder with 161 points.

Bill McDougall, Stan Drulia, and David Desharnais are the only three winners of this award to advance to the National Hockey League. Scott Gomez, who had played with the Alaska Aces during the 2004–05 NHL lockout, and Ed Courtenay, and Jesse Schultz are the only award winners to have NHL experience before winning the award.

== List of ECHL Leading Scorer Award winners ==
Season	Player	Team	Points
1988–89	Daryl Harpe	Erie Panthers	122
1989–90	Bill McDougall	Erie Panthers	148
1990–91	Stan Drulia	Knoxville Cherokees	140
1991–92	Phil Berger	Greensboro Monarchs	130
1992–93	Trevor Jobe	Norfolk Admirals	161
1993–94	Phil Berger (2)	Greensboro Monarchs	139
1994–95	Scott Burfoot	Erie Panthers	97
1995–96	Hugo P. Bélanger	Nashville Knights	144
1996–97	Ed Courtenay	South Carolina Stingrays	110
1997–98	Jamey Hicks	Birmingham Bulls	119
1998–99	John Spoltore	Louisiana IceGators	109
1999–00	John Spoltore (2)	Louisiana IceGators	84
2000–01	Scott King	Charlotte Checkers	101
2001–02	Louis Dumont	Pensacola Ice Pilots	102
2002–03	Buddy Smith	Arkansas RiverBlades	104
2003–04	Tim Smith	Columbia Inferno	95
2004–05	Scott Gomez	Alaska Aces	86
2005–06	Alex Leavitt	Alaska Aces	91
2006–07	Brad Schell	Gwinnett Gladiators	110
2007–08	David Desharnais	Cincinnati Cyclones	106
2008–09	Kevin Baker	Florida Everblades	102
2009–10	Tyler Donati	Elmira Jackals	114
2010–11	Justin Donati	Elmira Jackals	94
2011–12	Dustin Gazley	Elmira Jackals	85
2012–13	Mathieu Roy	Florida Everblades	89
2013–14	Brandon Marino	Fort Wayne Komets	88
2014–15	Chad Costello	Allen Americans	125
2015–16	Chad Costello (2)	Allen Americans	103
2016–17	Chad Costello (3)	Allen Americans	122
2017–18	Shawn Szydlowski	Fort Wayne Komets	79
2018–19	Jesse Schultz	Cincinnati Cyclones	80
2019–20	Josh Kestner	Toledo Walleye	73 (Note: Shortened season due to COVID-19 pandemic.)
2020–21	Aaron Luchuk	Orlando Solar Bears	74
2021–22	Will Graber	Fort Wayne Komets	83
2022–23	Hank Crone	Allen Americans	105
2023–24	Brandon Hawkins	Toledo Walleye	93
2024–25	Brandon Hawkins (2)	Toledo Walleye	89

Award recipients listed as of May 2025

== See also ==
- ECHL awards
