= ECHL Most Valuable Player =

Ice hockey award

The ECHL Most Valuable Player is an ice hockey award presented annually by the ECHL to the player adjudged to be the most valuable to his team. This award was first presented following the inaugural 1988–89 ECHL season to Daryl Harpe of the Erie Panthers.

== List of winners ==
Season	Winner	Team	Notes
1988–89	Daryl Harpe	Erie Panthers	
1989–90	Bill McDougall	Erie Panthers	
1990–91	Stan Drulia	Knoxville Cherokees	
1991–92	Phil Berger	Greensboro Monarchs	
1992–93	Trevor Jobe	Nashville Knights	
1993–94	Joe Flanagan	Birmingham Bulls	
1994–95	Vadim Slivchenko	Wheeling Thunderbirds	
1995–96	Hugo P. Belanger	Nashville Knights	
1996–97	Mike Ross	South Carolina Stingrays	
1997–98	Jamey Hicks	Birmingham Bulls	
1998–99	Chris Valicevic	Louisiana IceGators	
1999–00	Andrew Williamson	Toledo Storm	
2000–01	Scott King	Charlotte Checkers	
2001–02	Frederic Cloutier	Louisiana IceGators	
2002–03	Buddy Smith	Arkansas RiverBlades	
2003–04	Scott Stirling	Atlantic City Boardwalk Bullies	
2004–05	Scott Gomez	Alaska Aces	
2005–06	Jeff Campbell	Gwinnett Gladiators	
2006–07	Brad Schell	Gwinnett Gladiators	
2007–08	David Desharnais	Cincinnati Cyclones	
2008–09	Kevin Baker	Florida Everblades	
2009–10	Tyler Donati	Elmira Jackals	
2010–11	Wes Goldie	Alaska Aces	
2011–12	Chad Costello	Colorado Eagles	
2012–13	Ryan Zapolski	South Carolina Stingrays	
2013–14	Mickey Lang	Orlando Solar Bears	
2014–15	Jeff Jakaitis	South Carolina Stingrays	
2015–16	Chad Costello	Allen Americans	Second win
2016–17	Chad Costello	Allen Americans	Third win
2017–18	Shawn Szydlowski	Fort Wayne Komets	
2018–19	Jesse Schultz	Cincinnati Cyclones	
2019–20	Josh Kestner	Toledo Walleye	
2020–21	Anthony Beauregard	Wichita Thunder	
2021–22	Will Graber	Fort Wayne Komets	
2022–23	Hank Crone	Allen Americans	
2023–24	Brandon Hawkins	Toledo Walleye	
2024–25	Brandon Hawkins	Toledo Walleye	Second win

== See also ==
- ECHL awards
