= Brabham Cup =

East Coast Hockey League (ECHL) regular season trophy

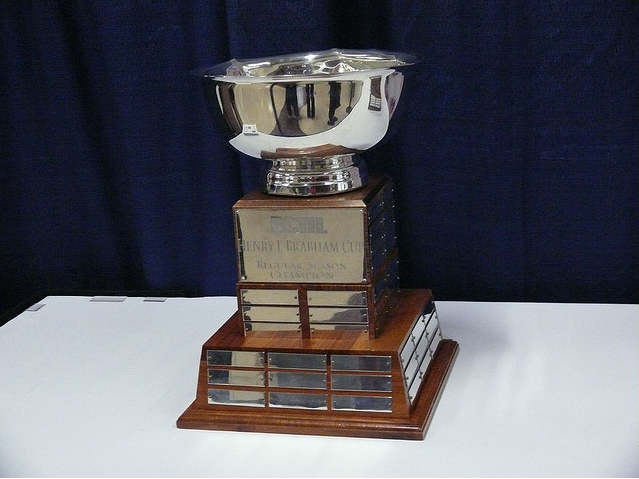
- Sport: Ice hockey
- Awarded for: ECHL team with the most points in the regular season

History
- First award: 1988–89 ECHL season
- First winner: Erie Panthers
- Most wins: Alaska Aces; Toledo Walleye (5 each)
- Most recent: Kansas City Mavericks

The Henry Brabham Cup is the trophy awarded annually by the ECHL to the team that finishes with the most points in the league during the regular season. The Brabham Cup has been awarded 34 times to 16 different franchises since its debut in 1989.

== History ==
Unlike the playoff championship, which was originally awarded with the Riley Cup and now the Kelly Cup, the trophy was introduced during the league's inaugural season in 1988 by the league's board of governors and was named after in recognition of Henry Brabham, who co-founded the ECHL in 1988–89 with five teams in four states. Brabham, who was the first inductee into the ECHL Hall of Fame in 2008, owned three of the original five teams. The Virginia businessman was crucial to the league surviving its earliest seasons.

Only five Brabham Cup winners have gone on to win the ECHL Kelly Cup playoff championship, with the Alaska Aces doing so three times, despite the guaranteed home-ice advantage in all rounds of the playoffs.

Nine franchises — the Alaska Aces, Cincinnati Cyclones, Florida Everblades, Idaho Steelheads, Kansas City Mavericks franchise (including the Missouri Mavericks), Knoxville Cherokees franchise (including the Pee Dee Pride), Louisiana IceGators, Toledo Storm franchise (including Toledo Walleye), and the Thunderbirds/Nailers franchise (the Winston-Salem Thunderbirds and the Wheeling Thunderbirds/Nailers) have won the Brabham Cup on multiple occasions, with the Aces and Storm/Walleye winning five times, the Everblades winning four, the former Cherokees/Pride, Thunderbirds/Nailers and Mavericks franchises having won three each, while the others have two.

== Winners ==
Team won the Kelly Cup.
Team lost in the Kelly (or Riley) Cup finals.

Defunct franchises are listed in italics.

Year	Winner	Points	Playoff result	Cup #
1988–89	Erie Panthers	77	Lost Semifinals (CAR)	1
1989–90	Winston-Salem Thunderbirds	82	Lost Riley Cup Finals (GRE)	1
1990–91	Knoxville Cherokees	97	Lost Division Semifinals (LOU)	1
1991–92	Toledo Storm	95	Lost Division 1st Round (LOU)	1
1992–93	Wheeling Thunderbirds	88	Lost Riley Cup Finals (TOL)	2
1993–94	Knoxville Cherokees	94	Lost 1st Round (LOU)	2
1994–95	Wheeling Thunderbirds	97	Lost 1st Round (BIR)	3
1995–96	Richmond Renegades	105	Lost Riley Cup Quarterfinals (JAX)	1
1996–97	South Carolina Stingrays	100	Won Kelly Cup	1
1997–98	Louisiana IceGators	96	Lost Kelly Cup Semifinals (PEN)	1
1998–99	Pee Dee Pride	106	Lost Conference Finals (MIS)	1
1999–2000	Florida Everblades	108	Lost Conference Quarterfinals (AUG)	1
2000–01	Trenton Titans	104	Lost Kelly Cup Finals (SC)	1
2001–02	Louisiana IceGators	116	Lost Division Semifinals (JAC)	2
2002–03	Toledo Storm	104	Lost Division Finals (CIN)	2
2003–04	San Diego Gulls	108	Lost Division Semifinals (AK)	1
2004–05	Pensacola Ice Pilots	107	Lost Conference Quarterfinals (GVL)	1
2005–06	Alaska Aces	113	Won Kelly Cup	1
2006–07	Las Vegas Wranglers	106	Lost Conference Semifinals (IDH)	1
2007–08	Cincinnati Cyclones	115	Won Kelly Cup	1
2008–09	Florida Everblades	.730^{1}	Lost Division Finals (SC)	2
2009–10	Idaho Steelheads	103	Lost Kelly Cup Finals (CIN)	1
2010–11	Alaska Aces	97	Won Kelly Cup	2
2011–12	Alaska Aces	97	Lost Conference Finals (LV)	3
2012–13	Alaska Aces	106	Lost Conference Semifinals (STK)	4
2013–14	Alaska Aces	97	Won Kelly Cup	5
2014–15	Toledo Walleye	107	Lost Conference Finals (SC)	3
2015–16	Missouri Mavericks	109	Lost Conference Semifinals (ALN)	1
2016–17	Toledo Walleye	106	Lost Conference Finals (COL)	4
2017–18	Florida Everblades	112	Lost Kelly Cup Finals (COL)	3
2018–19	Cincinnati Cyclones	110	Lost Division Finals (TOL)	2
2019–20	Not awarded^{2}			
2020–21	Florida Everblades	.667^{3}	Lost Conference Semifinals (SC)	4
2021–22	Toledo Walleye	.708^{3}	Lost Kelly Cup Finals (FLA)	5
2022–23	Idaho Steelheads	119	Lost Kelly Cup Finals (FLA)	2
2023–24	Kansas City Mavericks	114	Lost Kelly Cup Finals (FLA)	2
2024–25	South Carolina Stingrays	109	Lost Division Semifinals (ORL)	2
2025–26	Kansas City Mavericks	115	Lost Kelly Cup Finals (FLA)	3

=== Notes ===
1. Results based on points percentage, not total points, as teams ceased operations mid-season and not all teams played 72 games.
2. The South Carolina Stingrays and the Florida Everblades were both tied at 92 points after 62 games were played when the ECHL announced that the remainder of its 2019–20 season would not be played due to the COVID-19 pandemic.
3. Due to the ongoing COVID-19 pandemic, teams played an imbalanced schedule and the regular season championship was awarded based on points percentage.

== See also ==
- Kelly Cup
- ECHL
