= Daryl Harpe =

Canadian ice hockey player

- Born: August 12, 1966 (age 59) Fort McMurray, Alberta, Canada
- Height: 5 ft 11 in (180 cm)
- Weight: 170 lb (77 kg; 12 st 2 lb)
- Position: Forward
- Played for: ECHL; Erie Panthers; Cincinnati Cyclones; Knoxville Cherokees; Tulsa Oilers; ACHL; Erie Golden Blades
- Playing career: 1987–1992

Daryl Harpe (born August 12, 1966) is a Canadian former professional ice hockey player.

From 1983 to 1986, Harpe played junior hockey, and is the all-time leading scorer, for the now defunct Hobbema Hawks of the Alberta Junior Hockey League (AJHL).

Harpe played 182 regular season games and 15 playoff games in the East Coast Hockey League (ECHL) with the Erie Panthers, Cincinnati Cyclones, and Knoxville Cherokees. During the inaugural 1988–89 ECHL season, Harpe scored 34 goals and 86 assists with the Erie Panthers to lead the ECHL with 122 points. He was selected the ECHL Most Valuable Player and named to the 1988–89 All-ECHL Team.

== Awards and honours ==
Award	Year
ECHL Leading Scorer Award (122 points)	1988–89 ECHL season
All-ECHL Team	1988–89 ECHL season
ECHL Most Valuable Player	1988–89 ECHL season
