= Mike Bukta =

Canadian former ice hockey player

- Born: June 1, 1967 (age 57); Calgary, Alberta, Canada
- Height: 5 ft 10 in (178 cm)
- Weight: 183 lb (83 kg; 13 st 1 lb)
- Position: Defence
- Shot: Left
- Played for: Nashville Knights
- NHL draft: Undrafted
- Playing career: 1989–1991

Mike Bukta (born June 1, 1967) is a Canadian former ice hockey player who played two seasons in the ECHL for the Nashville Knights.

== Career statistics ==
			Regular season					Playoffs
Season	Team	League	GP	G	A	Pts	PIM	GP	G	A	Pts	PIM
1983–84	Swift Current Broncos	SJHL	47	9	6	15	119	—	—	—	—	—
1983–84	Calgary Wranglers	WHL	11	0	0	0	5	4	0	0	0	2
1984–85	Calgary Wranglers	WHL	42	5	14	19	83	—	—	—	—	—
1984–85	Seattle Breakers	WHL	26	4	8	12	35	—	—	—	—	—
1985–86	Seattle Thunderbirds	WHL	30	5	29	34	34	—	—	—	—	—
1985–86	Saskatoon Blades	WHL	28	4	25	29	36	11	2	4	6	14
1986–87	Saskatoon Blades	WHL	65	8	36	44	96	11	0	8	8	18
1987–88	Saskatoon Blades	WHL	61	16	40	56	66	10	2	8	10	12
1989–90	Nashville Knights	ECHL	56	9	32	41	86	5	0	1	1	8
1990–91	Nashville Knights	ECHL	48	11	42	53	87	—	—	—	—	—
ECHL totals			104	20	74	94	173	5	0	1	1	8
