= Hansis =

Hansis is a surname. Notable people with the surname include:

- Ron Hansis (born 1952), American ice hockey player
- Van Hansis (born 1981), American actor
