= Hobbema Hawks =

- City: Hobbema, Alberta
- League: Alberta Junior Hockey League
- Founded: 1981

Franchise history
- 1981–1990: Hobbema Hawks
- 1990–1993: leave of absence
- 1993: ceased operations

The Hobbema Hawks were a junior "A" ice hockey team in the Alberta Junior Hockey League (AJHL) based in Hobbema, Alberta, Canada.

== History ==
The Hobbema Hawks were established in 1981 as part of the Alberta Junior Hockey League's expansion. They were one of two teams to join the league that season, alongside the Fort McMurray Oil Barons. The Hawks played their inaugural season in the 1981–82 campaign. The team ceased operations in 1993 after taking a leave of absence prior to the 1990–91 season.

During their tenure in the AJHL, their best season was in 1985–86, where they achieved a 32–19–1 record under head coach Peter Driscoll. The team played a total of 532 regular season games over nine seasons, accumulating a record of 193 wins, 324 losses, and 15 ties. Despite their efforts, the Hawks did not qualify for the playoffs during their final four seasons.

In 1990, the team took a leave of absence from the league and ultimately ceased operations in 1993

=== Notable players ===
One of the most prominent players to have played for the Hobbema Hawks was Daryl Harpe. Harpe was the all-time leading scorer for the team, having played from 1983 to 1986. He recorded 116 goals and 186 assists over 214 games. Following his junior career, Harpe went on to play professionally in the East Coast Hockey League (ECHL), where he led the league with 122 points during the 1988–89 season and was named the ECHL Most Valuable Player.

== Season-by-season record ==
Note: GP = games played, W = wins, L = losses, T = Ties, OTL = overtime losses, Pts = points, Pct = Winning Percentage, GF = goals for, GA = goals against, PIM = penalties in minutes

Season	GP	W	L	T	OTL	Pts	Pct	GF	GA	PIM
1981–82	60	23	33	4	0	50	0.417	226	319	0
1982–83	60	24	35	1	0	49	0.408	283	342	0
1983–84	60	19	38	3	0	41	0.342	286	347	0
1984–85	60	28	31	1	0	57	0.475	252	260	0
1985–86	52	32	19	1	0	65	0.625	261	225	0
1986–87	60	19	40	1	0	39	0.325	267	327	0
1987–88	60	20	40	0	0	40	0.333	237	327	0
1988–89	60	12	44	4	0	28	0.233	179	313	0
1989–90	60	16	44	0	0	32	0.267	297	426	0
1990–91	leave of absence
1991–92	leave of absence
1992–93	leave of absence

== See also ==
- List of ice hockey teams in Alberta
