= Alain Morissette =

Canadian ice hockey player

- Born: August 26, 1969 (age 56) Rimouski, Quebec, Canada
- Height: 5 ft 10 in (178 cm)
- Weight: 168 lb (76 kg; 12 st 0 lb)
- Position: Goaltender
- Caught: Left
- Played for: AHL; Fredericton Canadiens; ECHL; Winston-Salem Thunderbirds; Knoxville Cherokees; Louisville RiverFrogs; IHL; Muskegon Lumberjacks; WPHL; Waco Wizards; WCHL; Idaho Steelheads; QSPHL; Joliette Blizzard; Joliette Mission; Laval Chiefs
- NHL draft: Undrafted
- Playing career: 1990–2002

Alain Morissette (born August 26, 1969) is a Canadian former professional ice hockey goaltender.

Prior to turning professional, Morissette played major junior hockey in the Quebec Major Junior Hockey League.

In a 1996 ECHL game while playing for the Louisville RiverFrogs, Morissette became the only goaltender in hockey history ever to surrender a goal to another goaltender. The goal was scored by Nick Vitucci of the Charlotte Checkers.

== Awards and honours ==
Award	Year
ECHL Goaltender of the Year	1995–96
ECHL First All-Star Team	1995–96
