= Barry Potomski =

Canadian ice hockey player

- Born: November 24, 1972 Windsor, Ontario, Canada
- Died: May 24, 2011 (aged 38) Windsor, Ontario, Canada
- Height: 6 ft 1 in (185 cm)
- Weight: 222 lb (101 kg; 15 st 12 lb)
- Position: Right Wing
- Shot: Left
- Played for: Los Angeles Kings; San Jose Sharks
- NHL draft: Undrafted
- Playing career: 1992–2001

Barry Andrew Potomski (November 24, 1972 – May 24, 2011) was a Canadian professional ice hockey right winger. He played 68 National Hockey League games: 59 with the Los Angeles Kings and 9 with the San Jose Sharks.

Potomski died on May 24, 2011, after collapsing at a fitness centre, Lifestyle Family Fitness in Windsor.

== Career statistics ==
			Regular season					Playoffs
Season	Team	League	GP	G	A	Pts	PIM	GP	G	A	Pts	PIM
1989–90	London Knights	OHL	9	0	2	2	18	—	—	—	—	—
1990–91	London Knights	OHL	65	14	17	31	202	7	0	2	2	10
1991–92	London Knights	OHL	61	19	32	51	224	10	5	1	6	22
1992–93	Erie Panthers	ECHL	5	1	1	2	31	—	—	—	—	—
1992–93	Toledo Storm	ECHL	43	5	18	23	184	14	5	2	7	73
1993–94	Toledo Storm	ECHL	13	9	4	13	81	—	—	—	—	—
1993–94	Adirondack Red Wings	AHL	50	9	5	14	224	11	1	1	2	44
1994–95	Phoenix Roadrunners	IHL	42	5	6	11	171	—	—	—	—	—
1995–96	Los Angeles Kings	NHL	33	3	2	5	104	—	—	—	—	—
1995–96	Phoenix Roadrunners	IHL	24	5	2	7	74	3	1	0	1	8
1996–97	Los Angeles Kings	NHL	26	3	2	5	93	—	—	—	—	—
1996–97	Phoenix Roadrunners	IHL	28	2	11	13	58	—	—	—	—	—
1997–98	San Jose Sharks	NHL	9	0	1	1	30	—	—	—	—	—
1997–98	Las Vegas Thunder	IHL	31	3	2	5	143	4	1	0	1	13
1998–99	Adirondack Red Wings	AHL	75	9	7	16	220	1	0	0	0	2
1999–00	San Diego Gulls	WCHL	51	13	30	43	211	9	4	4	8	12
1999–00	Long Beach Ice Dogs	IHL	1	0	0	0	0	—	—	—	—	—
2000–01	Idaho Steelheads	WCHL	32	10	8	18	50	9	4	3	7	18
NHL totals			68	6	5	11	227	—	—	—	—	—
AHL totals			125	18	12	30	444	12	1	1	2	46
