= 2001–02 ECHL season =

Ice hockey league season

- League: East Coast Hockey League
- Sport: Ice hockey

Regular season
- Brabham Cup: Louisiana IceGators
- Season MVP: Frederic Cloutier (Louisiana)
- Top scorer: Louis Dumont (Pensacola)

Playoffs
- Northern champions: Dayton Bombers
- Northern runners-up: Atlantic City Boardwalk Bullies
- Southern champions: Greenville Grrrowl
- Southern runners-up: Mississippi Sea Wolves
- Playoffs MVP: Simon Gamache and Tyrone Garner (Greenville)

Finals
- Champions: Greenville Grrrowl
- Runners-up: Dayton Bombers

ECHL seasons
- ← 2000–01 2002–03 →

The 2001–02 ECHL season was the 14th season of the East Coast Hockey League. Before the start of the season, the league saw one expansion franchise and five relocations, three of which were through the buying of the franchise rights of former clubs that had ceased operations. These relocations include the rights to the Columbus Chill moving to Reading, PA, the rights to the Hampton Roads Admirals moving to Columbus, GA, and the rights to the Miami Matadors relocating to the former ECHL market of Cincinnati, OH. The league also saw current franchises Birmingham Bulls move to Atlantic City, NJ and Tallahassee Tiger Sharks move to Macon, GA. The league also welcomed its fourth franchise from the state of South Carolina with an expansion franchise in the state's capital of Columbia, SC. The Louisiana IceGators finished first overall in the regular season, winning the Brabham Cup with the best record in league history. The Greenville Grrrowl won their first Kelly Cup sweeping the Dayton Bombers in four games.

During the opening weekend of the ECHL season, the league had a moment of silence for former South Carolina Stingrays player Mark Bavis, who had been killed in the September 11 terrorist attacks. Ryan Brindley, who was wearing #12 for the Stingrays in the previous season, changed to #55 after the team retired the number that Bavis had worn during his two seasons (1994–96) with the Stingrays.

== Playoff format ==
The ECHL realigned the playoff format for the season.

=== Northern Conference ===
The top four teams in each division would qualify for the playoffs, with the division champions being ranked first in their brackets and the other qualified teams ranked by points. The first seeds will play the fourth seeds and the second seeds will play the third seeds in best-of-five series in the Division Semifinals. The winners will advance to the best-of-five Division Finals and the playoff winners of each division would play each other in a best-of-five Conference Championship series, with the winner advancing to the Kelly Cup Finals.

=== Southern Conference ===
The top five teams in each division would qualify for the playoffs, with the division champions being ranked first in their brackets and the other qualified teams ranked by points. The fourth and fifth seeds of each division will play a single-game series in the Division Wild Card, with each winner advancing to play their division leader in the best-of-five Division Semifinal series, while the second seeds will play the third seeds in best-of-five series in the Division Semifinals. The winners will advance to the best-of-five Division Finals and the playoff winners of each division would play each other in a best-of-five Conference Championship series, with the winner advancing to the Kelly Cup Finals.

== Regular season ==
=== Final standings ===
Note: GP = Games played; W = Wins; L= Losses; T = Ties; GF = Goals for; GA = Goals against; Pts = Points; Green shade = Clinched playoff spot; Blue shade = Clinched division; (z) = Clinched home-ice advantage

==== Northern Conference ====
Northeast Division	GP	W	L	T	Pts	GF	GA
Trenton Titans	72	46	16	10	102	238	178
Charlotte Checkers	72	41	20	11	93	256	207
Atlantic City Boardwalk Bullies	72	42	22	8	92	233	209
Roanoke Express	72	35	26	11	81	242	223
Richmond Renegades	72	32	30	10	74	191	225
Reading Royals	72	27	36	9	63	182	215
Greensboro Generals	72	23	41	8	54	188	278

Northwest Division	GP	W	L	T	Pts	GF	GA
Dayton Bombers	72	40	20	12	92	222	196
Peoria Rivermen	72	41	23	8	90	206	179
Johnstown Chiefs	72	39	31	2	80	220	232
Cincinnati Cyclones	72	36	30	6	78	210	207
Wheeling Nailers	72	36	32	4	76	213	208
Toledo Storm	72	28	34	10	66	225	265

==== Southern Conference ====
Southeast Division	GP	W	L	T	Pts	GF	GA
Greenville Grrrowl	72	43	23	6	92	231	198
Pee Dee Pride	72	41	25	6	88	236	218
Columbia Inferno	72	36	22	14	86	211	197
South Carolina Stingrays	72	39	26	7	85	235	225
Florida Everblades	72	37	27	8	82	207	221
Augusta Lynx	72	36	26	10	82	218	224
Macon Whoopee	72	29	31	12	70	194	228
Columbus Cottonmouths	72	24	37	11	59	197	242

Southwest Division	GP	W	L	T	Pts	GF	GA
Louisiana IceGators	72	56	12	4	116	261	156
Mississippi Sea Wolves	72	41	26	5	87	251	232
Pensacola Ice Pilots	72	38	28	6	82	247	242
Jackson Bandits	72	34	29	9	77	187	202
New Orleans Brass	72	36	32	4	76	211	209
Mobile Mysticks	72	28	26	18	74	215	237
Arkansas RiverBlades	72	31	31	10	72	189	206
Baton Rouge Kingfish	72	29	35	8	66	187	244

== Kelly Cup playoffs ==
=== Northern Conference ===
==== Bracket ====
Division Semifinals (Best of 5)
NE.1	Trenton	3
NE.4	Roanoke	1
Northeast Division
NE.2	Charlotte	2
NE.3	Atlantic City	3
NW.1	Dayton	3
NW.4	Cincinnati	0
Northwest Division
NW.2	Peoria	2
NW.3	Johnstown	3

Division Finals (Best of 5)
NE.1	Trenton	0
NE.3	Atlantic City	3
NW.1	Dayton	3
NW.3	Johnstown	0

Conference Finals (Best of 5)
NE.3	Atlantic City	1
NW.1	Dayton	3

==== Division semifinals ====
Northeast Division Semifinals (1) Trenton vs. (4) Roanoke
Date	Away	Home
April 2	Roanoke 1	Trenton 2
April 3	Roanoke 4	Trenton 1
April 5	Trenton 6	Roanoke 1
April 7	Trenton 5	Roanoke 2
Trenton wins series 3–1

Northeast Division Semifinals (2) Charlotte vs. (3) Atlantic City
Date	Away	Home	
April 2	Atlantic City 4	Charlotte 1	
April 3	Atlantic City 1	Charlotte 4	
April 5	Charlotte 4	Atlantic City 3	OT
April 6	Charlotte 0	Atlantic City 6	
April 10	Atlantic City 4	Charlotte 2	
Atlantic City wins series 3–2

Northwest Division Semifinals (1) Dayton vs. (4) Cincinnati
Date	Away	Home	
April 3	Cincinnati 1	Dayton 4	
April 5	Dayton 1	Cincinnati 0	OT
April 6	Cincinnati 1	Dayton 2	
Dayton wins series 3–0

Northwest Division Semifinals (2) Peoria vs. (3) Johnstown
Date	Away	Home
April 2	Johnstown 1	Peoria 2
April 3	Johnstown 0	Peoria 1
April 5	Peoria 1	Johnstown 6
April 6	Peoria 1	Johnstown 3
April 9	Johnstown 4	Peoria 0
Johnstown wins series 3–2

==== Division finals ====
Northeast Division Finals (1) Trenton vs. (3) Atlantic City
Date	Away	Home	
April 12	Atlantic City 4	Trenton 3	OT
April 15	Atlantic City 3	Trenton 0	
April 16	Trenton 1	Atlantic City 4	
Atlantic City wins series 3–0

Northwest Division Finals (1) Dayton vs. (3) Johnstown
Date	Away	Home	
April 12	Johnstown 3	Dayton 4	2OT
April 13	Johnstown 1	Dayton 3	
April 18	Dayton 5	Johnstown 1	
Dayton wins series 3–0

==== Conference finals ====
(NE.2) Atlantic City vs. (NW.1) Dayton
Date	Away	Home
April 24	Dayton 3	Atlantic City 2
April 26	Dayton 3	Atlantic City 4
April 28	Atlantic City 2	Dayton 3
April 29	Atlantic City 2	Dayton 5
Dayton wins series 3–1

=== Southern Conference ===
==== Bracket ====
Division Wild Card	Division Semifinals (Best of 5)
SE.1	Greenville	3
SE.5	Florida	2
SE.4	South Carolina	0
SE.5	Florida	1
Southeast Division
SE.2	Pee Dee	3
SE.3	Columbia	2
SW.1	Louisiana	2
SW.4	Jackson	3
SW.4	Jackson	1
SW.5	New Orleans	0
Southwest Division
SW.2	Mississippi	3
SW.3	Pensacola	0

Division Finals (Best of 5)
SE.1	Greenville	3
SE.2	Pee Dee	1
SW.4	Jackson	0
SW.2	Mississippi	3

Conference Finals (Best of 5)
SE.1	Greenville	3
SW.2	Mississippi	1

==== Division Wild Card ====
Southeast Division Wildcard (4) South Carolina vs. (5) Florida
Date	Away	Home
April 2	Florida 3	South Carolina 2
Florida wins series 1–0

Southwest Division Wildcard (4) Jackson vs. (5) New Orleans
Date	Away	Home
April 2	New Orleans 1	Jackson 3
Jackson wins series 1–0

==== Division semifinals ====
Southeast Division Semifinals (1) Greenville vs. (5) Florida
Date	Away	Home
April 4	Florida 4	Greenville 2
April 5	Florida 1	Greenville 5
April 7	Greenville 3	Florida 6
April 8	Greenville 4	Florida 2
April 10	Florida 3	Greenville 4
Greenville wins series 3–2

Southeast Division Semifinals (2) Pee Dee vs. (3) Columbia
Date	Away	Home	
April 3	Columbia 3	Pee Dee 2	OT
April 5	Pee Dee 2	Columbia 1	
April 6	Columbia 2	Pee Dee 6	
April 7	Pee Dee 2	Columbia 3	
April 10	Columbia 4	Pee Dee 5	
Pee Dee wins series 3–2

Southwest Division Semifinals (1) Louisiana vs. (4) Jackson
Date	Away	Home	
April 3	Jackson 2	Louisiana 5	
April 5	Jackson 5	Louisiana 4	3OT
April 7	Louisiana 2	Jackson 3	OT
April 8	Jackson 0	Louisiana 3	
April 10	Jackson 4	Louisiana 2	
Jackson wins series 3–2

Southwest Division Semifinals (2) Mississippi vs. (3) Pensacola
Date	Away	Home	
April 3	Pensacola 2	Mississippi 4	
April 5	Pensacola 4	Mississippi 6	
April 6	Mississippi 3	Pensacola 2	OT
Mississippi wins series 3–0

==== Division finals ====
Southeast Division Finals (1) Greenville vs. (2) Pee Dee
Date	Away	Home	
April 12	Pee Dee 6	Greenville 0	
April 13	Pee Dee 2	Greenville 7	
April 16	Greenville 2	Pee Dee 1	
April 17	Greenville 5	Pee Dee 4	OT
Greenville wins series 3–1

Southeast Division Finals (2) Mississippi vs. (4) Jackson
Date	Away	Home
April 12	Jackson 2	Mississippi 5
April 13	Jackson 1	Mississippi 6
April 19	Mississippi 3	Jackson 0
Mississippi wins series 3–0

==== Conference finals ====
(SE.1) Greenville vs. (SW.2) Mississippi
Date	Away	Home
April 25	Mississippi 1	Greenville 8
April 26	Mississippi 2	Greenville 3
April 28	Greenville 3	Mississippi 5
April 30	Greenville 6	Mississippi 2
Greenville wins series 3–1

=== Kelly Cup finals ===
Kelly Cup Finals (Best of 7)
NW.1	Dayton	0
SE.1	Greenville	4

(SE.1) Greenville vs. (NW.1) Dayton
Date	Away	Home	
May 3	Dayton 2	Greenville 6	
May 5	Dayton 1	Greenville 4	
May 8	Greenville 3	Dayton 2	OT
May 10	Greenville 5	Dayton 2	
Greenville wins series 4–0

== ECHL awards ==
Patrick J. Kelly Cup:	Greenville Grrrowl
Henry Brabham Cup:	Louisiana IceGators
Northern Conference Champion:	Dayton Bombers
Southern Conference Champion:	Greenville Grrrowl
John Brophy Award:	Dave Farrish (Louisiana)
ECHL Most Valuable Player:	Frederic Cloutier (Louisiana)
Kelly Cup Playoffs Most Valuable Player:	Simon Gamache and Tyrone Garner (Greenville)
ECHL Goaltender of the Year:	Frederic Cloutier (Louisiana)
ECHL Rookie of the Year:	Frederic Cloutier (Louisiana)
Defenseman of the Year:	Duncan Dalmao (Roanoke)
Leading Scorer:	Louis Dumont (Pensacola)
Plus Performer Award:	Konstantin Kalmikov (Louisiana)
Sportsmanship Award:	Ben Stafford (Trenton)

== See also ==
- ECHL All-Star Game
- List of ECHL seasons
- 2001 in sports
- 2002 in sports
