= Erie Panthers =

Defunct minor professional ice hockey team

- City: Erie, Pennsylvania
- League: East Coast Hockey League
- Conference: East/West/North
- Founded: 1988
- Home arena: Louis J. Tullio Arena
- Colors: Black, gray, white
- Owner: Henry Brabham
- General manager: Ron Hansis
- Head coach: Ron Hansis (1988–95); Barry Smith (1995–96)
- Affiliates: New York Islanders (1989–90), Buffalo Sabres (1992–94)

Franchise history
- 1988–1996: Erie Panthers
- 1996–2003: Baton Rouge Kingfish
- 2004–2011: Victoria Salmon Kings

The Erie Panthers were a professional ice hockey team based in Erie, Pennsylvania, from 1988 to 1996. The Panthers were one of the founding members of the East Coast Hockey League (ECHL).

== History ==
The Panthers were created by Henry Brabham, who was also an intricate part of the creation of the ECHL itself. Erie was chosen as a location due to the success of the former Erie Golden Blades. The Panthers enjoyed success earlier on in their existence with five straight playoff appearances. Though never winning the league championship, the team was named the regular season champs for the 1989–90 season. The next three years would bring about the end of the Panthers franchise with three straight losing seasons.

In 1996, the team would be moved to Baton Rouge, Louisiana and renamed the Baton Rouge Kingfish. There the team's struggles continued, making the playoffs in only one of seven seasons in Baton Rouge. In 2004, the franchise again relocated moving to Victoria, British Columbia. The franchise continued operation there as the Victoria Salmon Kings, garnering a Division Championship in the 2007–08 season.

The franchise finally ceased operations following the 2010–11 ECHL season, making way for the WHL's Victoria Royals. This marked the end of a 23-year franchise run, the longest in the league behind the Wheeling Nailers (Carolina Thunderbirds) and the Greenville Swamp Rabbits (Johnstown Chiefs), both of which continue to operate.

== Jersey and Logos ==
The Panthers' jerseys were black, white, and grey. The Home jersey had a white background, while the away jersey had a black background. The original logo was that of a grey panther and a hockey stick. During the 1991–92 season, the use of an alternate logo was added. This logo was the face of a growling panther in dark blue. The 1994–95 season saw the last logo change for the Panthers. This logo was a caricature of a panther, under the word "Erie". Also used during the 1994–95 season was a "20th Anniversary of Hockey in Erie" patch.

== The Erie Insurance Arena ==
The home of the Erie Panthers was the newly constructed Civic Center, now known as the Erie Insurance Arena, located in downtown Erie, Pennsylvania. The five-year-old arena held roughly 5,500 fans and served as one of the loudest places to play in the ECHL for eight years. Despite being a fairly new building, the Tullio Arena lacked a proper sound dampening system with the playing surface being surrounded on all sides by uncovered concrete walls. This design allowed the already loud noise of the crowd to be amplified throughout the building.

== Coaches ==
1989–95:
Head coach: Ron Hansis
Asst. Coach: Barry Smith
1995–96:
Head coach: Barry Smith

== Players ==
Over the course of the eight seasons in Erie, 225 players suited up for the Panthers, with sixty-eight of those having already been drafted in the NHL entry draft or NHL Supplemental Draft. Only three players have played in the NHL after playing for the Panthers.

Former players typically took one of two paths after leaving the team. They either played out their career in European hockey leagues, or joined the Roller Hockey International league.

=== NHL alumni ===
Player	Teams	GP	G	A	Pts	PIM	W	L	T	GAA	SV%
Peter Skudra	PIT, BUF, BOS, VAN	147	0	2	2	6	54	47	20	2.73	.900
Barry Potomski	LAK	68	6	5	11	277	-	-	-	-	-
Bill McDougall	DET, EDM, TBL	28	5	5	10	12	-	-	-	-	-

=== Individual awards ===
1989 Coach of the Year: Ron Hansis
1989 MVP Award: Daryl Harpe
1989 Leading Scorer: Daryl Harpe
1989 Defenseman of the Year: Kelly Szauter
1990 MVP Award: Bill McDougall
1990 Rookie of the Year: Bill McDougall
1990 Leading Scorer: Bill McDougall
1995 Rookie of the Year: Kevin McKinnon
1995 Leading Scorer: Scott Burfoot

== Season-by-season results ==
The 20th Anniversary of Hockey in Erie Patch.

Season	Conf.	GP	W	L	T	OTL	Pts	Pct	GF	GA	PIM	Playoffs
1988–89	None	60	37	20	0	3	77	0.642	327	256	1944	Lost in 1st round
1989–90	None	60	38	16	0	6	82	0.683	357	251	1813	Lost in 2nd round
1990–91	East	64	31	30	0	3	65	0.508	302	302	1845	Lost in 1st round
1991–92	West	64	33	27	0	4	70	0.547	284	309	1662	Lost in 1st round
1992–93	West	64	35	25	0	4	74	0.578	305	307	2012	Lost in 2nd round
1993–94	North	68	27	36	0	5	59	0.434	264	334	2052	Did not qualify
1994–95	North	68	18	46	0	4	40	0.294	256	356	2092	Did not qualify
1995–96	North	70	25	40	0	5	55	0.393	227	293	2433	Did not qualify

== Playoffs ==
- 1988–89: Lost to Carolina 4–0 in semifinals.
- 1989–90: Defeated Hampton Roads 3–2 in quarterfinals; lost to Greensboro 2–0 in semifinals.
- 1990–91: Lost to Johnstown 3–2 in quarterfinals.
- 1991–92: Lost to Johnstown 3–1 in first round.
- 1992–93: Defeated Greensboro 1–0 in first round; lost to Toledo 3–1 in quarterfinals.

== Championships ==
1988–89 Henry Brabham Cup (Regular season points champions)

== Team records ==
Team Records for a single season
Statistic	Total	Season
Most points	82	1989–90
Most wins	38	1989–90
Most goals for	357	1989–90
Fewest goals for	227	1995–96
Fewest goals against	251	1989–90
Most goals against	356	1994–95
Longest win streak	12	1989–90
Most power-play goals	108	1992–93

Individual player records for a single season
Statistic	Player	Total	Season
Most Goals	Bill McDougall	80	1989–90
Most Assists	Daryl Harpe	84	1989–90
Most Points	Bill McDougall	148	1989–90
Most Points, rookie	Kevin McKinnon	85	1994–95
Most Points, defenceman	Ryan Kummu	76	1991–92
Most Penalty Minutes	Greg Spenrath	344	1992–93
Best GAA (Goalie)	Craig Barnett	3.93	1989–90
Goalies = minimum 1500 minutes played

Top 10 points leaders in Panthers history
Player	Total	Seasons (#)
Peter Buckeridge	275	1989–93 (4)
Daryl Harpe	194	1988–90 (2)
Ed Zawatsky	189	1990–93 (3)
Ryan Kummu	185	1989–92 (3)
Doug Stromback	178	1988–91 (3)
Grant Ottenbreit	171	1988–91 (3)
Bill McDougall	148	1989–90 (1)
Glen Goodall	126	1991–93 (2)
Stephane Charbonneau	121	1993–95 (2)
Bill Gall	117	1991–93 (2)

Top 10 penalty leaders in Panthers history
Player	Total	Seasons (#)
Grant Ottenbreit	845	1988–91 (3)
Greg Spenrath	751	1990–93 (2)
Cam Brown	698	1992–96 (3)
Ryan Kummu	495	1989–92 (3)
Brad Harrison	450	1994–96 (2)
Steve Wienke	364	1988–92 (3)
Jim Lessard	307	1992–94 (2)
Daryl Harpe	304	1988–90 (2)
Rob McDougall	301	1988–91 (3)
Dan O'Rourke	296	1993–94 (1)

== League Records ==
The Erie Panthers are ranked in the Top 5 of 38 categories kept track of by the ECHL. Of those, they are ranked #1 in 15 categories. Below is only a partial list of these records.

See Also: List of Erie Panthers League Records.

Most penalty minutes (Career)
#1: 2,425 - Cam Brown (Chill 91–93, Panthers 93–96, Kingfish 96–02, Gladiators 02–06)

Most goals, both teams (One game)
#1: 21 - Erie Panthers (13) vs. Carolina Thunderbirds (8), Dec. 21, 1988
#2: 20 - Richmond Renegades (15) vs. Erie Panthers (5), Dec. 23, 1990
#3: 19 - Erie Panthers (11) vs. Knoxville Cherokees (8), Mar. 18, 1989

Highest goals-per-game average (One season)
#1: 5.95 - Erie Panthers, 1989-90 (357 goals in 60 games)
#4: 5.45 - Erie Panthers, 1988-89 (327 goals in 60 games)

Fastest three goals
#1: 21 seconds - Doug Stromback (12:19), Daryl Harpe (12:29) and Hank Banas (12:40 of 3rd period), Erie vs. Knoxville, Nov. 29, 1988

Most penalty minutes, both teams (One game)
#1: 244 - Toledo Storm (124) vs. Erie (120), Mar. 22, 1993
