= John Spoltore (ice hockey) =

American ice hockey player (1971–2010)

- Born: August 25, 1971 Bridgeton, New Jersey, U.S.
- Died: April 30, 2010 (aged 38)
- Height: 5 ft 10 in (178 cm)
- Weight: 194 lb (88 kg; 13 st 12 lb)
- Position: Centre
- Shot: Right
- Played for: AHL; Providence Bruins; Springfield Falcons; IHL; Kalamazoo Wings; ECHL; Louisiana IceGators; WCPHL; San Diego Gulls; UHL; Chicago Hounds; Bloomington PrairieThunder
- NHL draft: Undrafted
- Playing career: 1995–2007

John Philip Spoltore (August 25, 1971–April 30, 2010) was an American professional ice hockey player.

== Career ==
From 1995–96 through 2000–01, Spoltore played with the Louisiana IceGators of the ECHL, scoring 532 points (142 goals and 390 assists) in 275 career ECHL games. On April 30, 2010, John passed away from brain cancer at age 38. In 2014, he was inducted into the ECHL Hall of Fame.

== Awards and honors ==
Award	Year
All-ECHL Second Team	1997–98
All-ECHL First Team	1998–99
All-ECHL First Team	1999–2000
