= 2017–18 ECHL season =

Ice hockey league season

- League: ECHL
- Sport: Ice hockey
- Duration: October 13, 2017 – June 9, 2018

Regular season
- Brabham Cup: Florida Everblades
- Season MVP: Shawn Szydlowski (Fort Wayne)
- Top scorer: Shawn Szydlowski (Fort Wayne)

Playoffs
- Eastern champions: Florida Everblades
- Eastern runners-up: Adirondack Thunder
- Western champions: Colorado Eagles
- Western runners-up: Fort Wayne Komets
- Playoffs MVP: Michael Joly (Colorado)

Kelly Cup
- Champions: Colorado Eagles
- Runners-up: Florida Everblades

ECHL seasons
- 2016–17 2018–19

The 2017–18 ECHL season is the 30th season of the ECHL. The regular season ran from October 13, 2017 to April 8, 2018, with the 2018 Kelly Cup playoffs following. Twenty-seven teams in 21 states and one Canadian province each played a 72-game schedule.

The Kelly Cup was won by the Colorado Eagles, playing in their last season in the ECHL before joining the American Hockey League, in seven games over the regular season champions, the Florida Everblades.

== League business ==
=== Team changes ===
- The Alaska Aces, three-time Kelly Cup champions and one of the last two teams remaining from the West Coast Hockey League, ceased operations. The franchise was later purchased and relocated to Portland, Maine, for the 2018–19 season.
- The Elmira Jackals had been losing money, suffering from ownership issues since 2012, and county operated since 2016. The county agency operating the team and arena had an agreement to sell the arena to a new owner, but the owner did not want the Jackals and the team ceased operations.
- The Missouri Mavericks were renamed as the Kansas City Mavericks.
- The Jacksonville Icemen (formerly the Evansville IceMen) rejoined after a one-year hiatus.
- The Worcester Railers are added as an expansion team. As with many of the 2015–16 season changes, the franchise replaces a former American Hockey League team, the Worcester Sharks.

=== Conference realignment ===
With the addition of another ECHL team in the South, the Jacksonville Icemen, the Cincinnati Cyclones returned to the Western Conference and Central Division after one season in the Eastern Conference. The Worcester Railers took the North Division spot vacated by the folded Elmira Jackals. The Western Conference divisions were reshuffled with the Kansas City Mavericks moving to the Central while the Tulsa Oilers and Wichita Thunder joined the Mountain Division.

=== Affiliation changes ===
ECHL team	New affiliates	Former affiliates
Adirondack Thunder	New Jersey Devils (NHL); Binghamton Devils (AHL)	Calgary Flames (NHL); Stockton Heat (AHL)
Cincinnati Cyclones	Buffalo Sabres (NHL); Rochester Americans (AHL)	Nashville Predators (NHL); Milwaukee Admirals (AHL)
Fort Wayne Komets	Arizona Coyotes (NHL); Tucson Roadrunners (AHL)	Independent
Jacksonville Icemen	Winnipeg Jets (NHL); Manitoba Moose (AHL)	Dormant
Kalamazoo Wings	Vancouver Canucks (NHL); Utica Comets (AHL)	Tampa Bay Lightning (NHL); Syracuse Crunch (AHL)
Kansas City Mavericks	Calgary Flames (NHL); Stockton Heat (AHL)	New York Islanders (NHL); Bridgeport Sound Tigers (AHL)
Norfolk Admirals	Nashville Predators (NHL); Milwaukee Admirals (AHL)	Edmonton Oilers (NHL); Bakersfield Condors (AHL)
Norfolk Admirals	Independent; As of November 28, 2017	Nashville Predators; Milwaukee Admirals
Quad City Mallards	Vegas Golden Knights (NHL); Chicago Wolves (AHL)	Minnesota Wild (NHL); Iowa Wild (AHL)
Rapid City Rush	Minnesota Wild (NHL); Iowa Wild (AHL)	Arizona Coyotes (NHL); Tucson Roadrunners (AHL)
Tulsa Oilers	St. Louis Blues (NHL)	Winnipeg Jets (NHL); Manitoba Moose (AHL)
Wichita Thunder	Edmonton Oilers (NHL); Bakersfield Condors (AHL)	Ottawa Senators (NHL); Binghamton Senators (AHL)
Worcester Railers	New York Islanders (NHL); Bridgeport Sound Tigers (AHL)	Expansion team

=== Annual Board of Governors meeting ===
The annual ECHL Board of Governors meeting were held at the New York-New York Hotel and Casino in Las Vegas, Nevada, on June 12 and 13, 2017. The ECHL Board of Governors re-elected Cincinnati Cyclones' president Ray Harris as chairman for a third season. The Board also approved of the transfer of the Alaska Aces franchise to Portland, Maine, for the 2018–19 season as well as the 2017–18 alignment.

=== All-star game ===
The 2018 CCM/ECHL All-Star Classic was held on January 15, 2018, at the Indiana Farmers Coliseum in Indianapolis. In a change from previous all-star game formats used by the ECHL, the league used the divisional format that has been used in the NHL and AHL since 2016. There were four teams, one for each division, playing a 3-on-3 player tournament with the winners of each conference match facing each other for a final game. Each game consisted of two seven-minute periods and each team was made up from seven players. In the semifinal round, the South Division defeated the North Division 3–1 and the Mountain Division defeated the Central Division 5–2.

The skills competition took place before the all-star championship game. The Cincinnati Cyclones' Justin Danforth won the fastest skater event, the Wichita Thunder's Shane Starrett won the rapid fire event, and the Orlando Solar Bears' Nolan Valleau won the hardest shot event.

The championship game was then played with the Mountain Division defeating the South Division after going into a shootout by a final score of 6–5. The South Carolina Stingrays' Taylor Cammarata of the South Division won the tournament's most valuable player award.

== Standings ==
Final standings.

Eastern Conference

North Division	GP	W	L	OTL	SOL	GF	GA	PTS
y – Adirondack Thunder (NJD)	72	41	24	3	4	233	221	89
x – Manchester Monarchs (LAK)	72	41	25	3	3	257	214	88
x – Reading Royals (PHI)	72	39	24	9	0	232	199	87
x – Worcester Railers (NYI)	72	37	27	4	4	194	193	82
Wheeling Nailers (PIT)	72	35	28	8	1	248	245	79
Brampton Beast (MTL)	72	28	34	6	4	210	245	66

South Division	GP	W	L	OTL	SOL	GF	GA	PTS
z – Florida Everblades (CAR)	72	53	13	2	4	261	171	112
x – South Carolina Stingrays (WSH)	72	48	16	7	1	214	153	104
x – Orlando Solar Bears (TOR)	72	33	30	6	3	212	228	75
x – Atlanta Gladiators (BOS)	72	32	35	2	3	205	229	69
Jacksonville Icemen (WPG)	72	26	39	4	3	203	246	59
Norfolk Admirals (Ind.)	72	26	39	6	1	211	269	59
Greenville Swamp Rabbits (NYR)	72	24	40	7	1	202	284	56

Western Conference

Central Division	GP	W	L	OTL	SOL	GF	GA	PTS
y – Toledo Walleye (DET)	72	50	17	3	2	242	170	105
x – Fort Wayne Komets (ARI)	72	46	20	5	1	290	216	98
x – Cincinnati Cyclones (BUF)	72	39	30	3	0	226	220	81
x – Indy Fuel (CHI)	72	36	30	5	1	242	248	78
Kalamazoo Wings (VAN)	72	34	31	4	3	251	251	75
Kansas City Mavericks (CGY)	72	34	32	4	2	204	223	74
Quad City Mallards (VGK)	72	25	42	4	1	196	295	55

Mountain Division	GP	W	L	OTL	SOL	GF	GA	PTS
y – Colorado Eagles (COL)	72	48	18	4	2	265	214	102
x – Idaho Steelheads (DAL)	72	44	20	5	3	244	188	96
x – Allen Americans (SJS)	72	35	29	6	2	235	232	78
x – Wichita Thunder (EDM)	72	34	30	6	2	222	235	76
Tulsa Oilers (STL)	72	31	29	3	9	214	233	74
Utah Grizzlies (ANA)	72	28	29	9	6	230	256	71
Rapid City Rush (MIN)	72	25	41	3	3	203	268	56

x - clinched playoff spot, y - clinched regular season division title, z - Brabham Cup (regular season) champion

== Postseason ==
=== Playoffs format ===
At the end of the regular season the top four teams in each division qualifies for the 2018 Kelly Cup playoffs and be seeded one through four based on highest point total earned in the season. Then the first two rounds of the playoffs are held within the division with the first seed facing the fourth seed and the second seed facing the third. The division champions then play each other in a conference championship. The Kelly Cup finals pits the Eastern Conference champion against the Western Conference champion. All four rounds are a best-of-seven format.

=== Bracket ===
Division Semifinals	Division Finals
N1	Adirondack Thunder	4
N4	Worcester Railers	2
N1	Adirondack	4
North Division
N2	Manchester	2
N2	Manchester Monarchs	4
N3	Reading Royals	0
Eastern Conference
S1	Florida Everblades	4
S4	Atlanta Gladiators	0
S1	Florida	4
South Division
S3	Orlando	1
S2	South Carolina Stingrays	0
S3	Orlando Solar Bears	4
C1	Toledo Walleye	4
C4	Indy Fuel	0
C1	Toledo	2
Central Division
C2	Fort Wayne	4
C2	Fort Wayne Komets	4
C3	Cincinnati Cyclones	1
Western Conference
M1	Colorado Eagles	4
M4	Wichita Thunder	2
M1	Colorado	4
Mountain Division
M2	Idaho	0
M2	Idaho Steelheads	4
M3	Allen Americans	3

Conference Finals
N1	Adirondack	1
S1	Florida	4
C2	Fort Wayne	3
M1	Colorado	4

Kelly Cup Finals
S1	Florida	3
M1	Colorado	4

== Awards ==
Award	Winner
Patrick Kelly Cup:	Colorado Eagles
Henry Brabham Cup:	Florida Everblades
Gingher Memorial Trophy:	Florida Everblades
Bruce Taylor Trophy:	Colorado Eagles
John Brophy Award:	Brad Ralph, Florida
CCM Most Valuable Player:	Shawn Szydlowski, Fort Wayne
Kelly Cup Playoffs Most Valuable Player:	Michael Joly, Colorado
Warrior Hockey Goaltender of the Year:	Parker Milner, South Carolina
CCM Rookie of the Year:	Justin Danforth, Cincinnati
CCM Defenseman of the Year:	Matt Register, Colorado
Leading Scorer:	Shawn Szydlowski, Fort Wayne
AMI Graphics Plus Performer Award:	Logan Roe, Florida
Sportsmanship Award:	Brodie Dupont, Norfolk
Community Service Award:	Jeremy Beaudry, Wichita
Birmingham Memorial Award:	Charlie O'Connor

=== All-ECHL teams ===
First Team

- Parker Milner (G) – South Carolina Stingrays
- David Makowski (D) – Allen Americans
- Matt Register (D) – Colorado Eagles
- Michael Joly (F) – Colorado Eagles
- Jordan LeVallee-Smotherman (F) – Manchester Monarchs
- Shawn Szydlowski (F) – Fort Wayne Komets

Second Team

- Pat Nagle (G) – Toledo Walleye
- Eric Knodel (D) – Cincinnati Cyclones
- Nolan Zajac (D) – Reading Royals
- Justin Danforth (F) – Cincinnati Cyclones
- Jesse Schultz (F) – Cincinnati Cyclones
- Matt Willows (F) – Reading Royals

Rookie Team

- Mitch Gillam (G) – Worcester Railers
- Aaron Irving (D) – Kalamazoo Wings
- TJ Melancon (D) – Norfolk Admirals
- Grant Besse (F) – Norfolk Admirals
- Justin Danforth (F) – Cincinnati Cyclones
- Reid Gardiner (F) – Wheeling Nailers

== See also ==
- List of ECHL seasons
- 2017 in sports
- 2018 in sports
