= 1991–92 ECHL season =

Ice hockey league season

The 1991–92 ECHL season was the fourth season of the ECHL. In 1991, the league welcomed four new franchises: the Columbus Chill, Dayton Bombers, Raleigh Icecaps, and Toledo Storm. The fifteen teams played 64 games in the schedule. The Toledo Storm finished first overall in the regular season. The Hampton Roads Admirals won their second straight Riley Cup championship.

== Regular season ==
Note: GP = Games played, W = Wins, L = Losses, T = Ties, Pts = Points, GF = Goals for, GA = Goals against, Green shade = Clinched playoff spot, Blue shade = Clinched division

| East Division | GP | W | L | OTL | Pts | GF | GA |
|---|---|---|---|---|---|---|---|
| Greensboro Monarchs | 64 | 43 | 17 | 4 | 90 | 297 | 252 |
| Hampton Roads Admirals | 64 | 42 | 20 | 2 | 86 | 298 | 220 |
| Winston-Salem Thunderbirds | 64 | 36 | 24 | 4 | 76 | 270 | 245 |
| Richmond Renegades | 64 | 30 | 27 | 7 | 67 | 263 | 263 |
| Raleigh Icecaps | 64 | 25 | 33 | 6 | 56 | 228 | 284 |
| Roanoke Valley Rebels | 64 | 21 | 36 | 7 | 49 | 236 | 313 |
| Knoxville Cherokees | 64 | 20 | 36 | 8 | 48 | 265 | 355 |

| West Division | GP | W | L | OTL | Pts | GF | GA |
|---|---|---|---|---|---|---|---|
| Toledo Storm | 64 | 46 | 15 | 3 | 95 | 367 | 240 |
| Cincinnati Cyclones | 64 | 36 | 20 | 8 | 80 | 329 | 284 |
| Johnstown Chiefs | 64 | 36 | 23 | 5 | 77 | 294 | 248 |
| Erie Panthers | 64 | 33 | 27 | 4 | 70 | 284 | 309 |
| Dayton Bombers | 64 | 32 | 26 | 6 | 70 | 305 | 300 |
| Louisville Icehawks | 64 | 31 | 25 | 8 | 70 | 315 | 306 |
| Columbus Chill | 64 | 25 | 30 | 9 | 59 | 298 | 341 |
| Nashville Knights | 64 | 24 | 36 | 4 | 52 | 246 | 335 |

== Riley Cup playoffs ==
=== Bracket ===
1st Round | 2nd Round
E1 | Greensboro | 4
E6 | Roanoke | 3
E1 | Greensboro | -
- | Bye | -
East
E2 | Hampton Roads | 3
E5 | Raleigh | 1
E2 | Hampton Roads | 2
E4 | Richmond | 0
E3 | Winston-Salem | 2
E4 | Richmond | 3
W1 | Toledo | 1
W6 | Louisville | 4
W6 | Louisville | -
- | Bye | -
West
W2 | Cincinnati | 3
W5 | Dayton | 0
W2 | Cincinnati | 2
W3 | Johnstown | 0
W3 | Johnstown | 3
W4 | Erie | 1

Division Final
E1 | Greensboro | 1
E2 | Hampton Roads | 3
W6 | Louisville | 3
W2 | Cincinnati | 1

Riley Cup Final
E2 | Hampton Roads | 4
W6 | Louisville | 0

=== East ===
==== 1st round ====
Greensboro vs. Roanoke Valley
| Away | Home | |
|---|---|---|
| Roanoke Valley 4 | Greensboro 1 | |
| Roanoke Valley 3 | Greensboro 1 | |
| Greensboro 5 | Roanoke Valley 2 | |
| Greensboro 5 | Roanoke Valley 1 | |
| Greensboro 6 | Roanoke Valley 1 | |
| Roanoke Valley 5 | Greensboro 4 | OT |
| Greensboro 6 | Roanoke Valley 2 | |
Greensboro wins series 4-3 and earns bye to Divisional Finals

Hampton Roads vs. Raleigh
| Away | Home | |
|---|---|---|
| Raleigh 5 | Hampton Roads 3 | |
| Hampton Roads 5 | Raleigh 3 | |
| Hampton Roads 3 | Raleigh 2 | OT |
| Hampton Roads 7 | Raleigh 6 | |
Hampton Roads wins series 3-1

Richmond vs. Winston-Salem
| Away | Home |
|---|---|
| Richmond 4 | Winston-Salem 3 |
| Winston-Salem 5 | Richmond 2 |
| Winston-Salem 8 | Richmond 3 |
| Richmond 5 | Winston-Salem 4 |
| Richmond 5 | Winston-Salem 2 |
Richmond wins series 3-2

==== 2nd round ====
Hampton Roads vs. Richmond
| Away | Home |
|---|---|
| Hampton Roads 5 | Richmond 2 |
| Hampton Roads 7 | Richmond 2 |
Hampton Roads wins series 2-0

==== Divisional Finals ====
Hampton Roads vs. Greensboro
| Away | Home | |
|---|---|---|
| Greensboro 3 | Hampton Roads 2 | |
| Hampton Roads 3 | Greensboro 1 | |
| Hampton Roads 3 | Greensboro 2 | |
| Hampton Roads 5 | Greensboro 4 | OT |
Hampton Roads wins series 3-1

=== West ===
==== 1st round ====
Toledo vs. Louisville
| Away | Home | |
|---|---|---|
| Toledo 4 | Louisville 3 | OT |
| Louisville 4 | Toledo 3 | |
| Louisville 5 | Toledo 2 | |
| Louisville 5 | Toledo 2 | |
| Louisville 6 | Toledo 5 | |
Louisville wins series 4-1 and earns bye to Divisional Finals

Cincinnati vs. Dayton
| Away | Home |
|---|---|
| Cincinnati 7 | Dayton 1 |
| Cincinnati 6 | Dayton 3 |
| Cincinnati 8 | Dayton 2 |
Cincinnati wins series 3-0

Erie vs. Johnstown
| Away | Home |
|---|---|
| Erie 4 | Johnstown 2 |
| Johnstown 4 | Erie 0 |
| Johnstown 5 | Erie 2 |
| Johnstown 5 | Erie 3 |
Johnstown wins series 3-1

==== 2nd round ====
Cincinnati vs. Johnstown
| Away | Home |
|---|---|
| Cincinnati 8 | Johnstown 1 |
| Cincinnati 7 | Johnstown 1 |
Cincinnati wins series 2-0

==== Divisional Finals ====
Louisville vs. Cincinnati
| Away | Home |
|---|---|
| Cincinnati 6 | Louisville 5 |
| Louisville 6 | Cincinnati 4 |
| Louisville 5 | Cincinnati 3 |
| Louisville 6 | Cincinnati 4 |
Louisville wins series 3-1

=== Riley Cup Finals ===
Hampton Roads vs. Louisville
| Away | Home | |
|---|---|---|
| Hampton Roads 4 | Louisville 3 | OT |
| Hampton Roads 5 | Louisville 2 | |
| Hampton Roads 4 | Louisville 0 | |
| Hampton Roads 8 | Louisville 3 | |
Hampton Roads wins series and Riley Cup 4-0

== ECHL awards ==
| Jack Riley Cup: | Hampton Roads Admirals |
| Henry Brabham Cup: | Toledo Storm |
| John Brophy Award: | Doug Sauter (Winston-Salem) |
| ECHL Most Valuable Player: | Phil Berger (Greensboro) |
| Riley Cup Playoffs Most Valuable Player: | Mark Bernard (Hampton Roads) |
| ECHL Rookie of the Year: | Darren Colbourne (Dayton) |
| Defenseman of the Year: | Scott White (Greensboro) |
| Leading Scorer: | Phil Berger (Greensboro) |

== See also ==
- ECHL All-Star Game
- Kelly Cup
- List of ECHL seasons
- 1991 in sports
- 1992 in sports
