= 2018–19 ECHL season =

Ice hockey league season

- League: ECHL
- Sport: Ice hockey
- Duration: October 12, 2018 – April 7, 2019

Regular season
- Brabham Cup: Cincinnati Cyclones
- Season MVP: Jesse Schultz (Cincinnati)
- Top scorer: Jesse Schultz (Cincinnati)

Playoffs
- Playoffs MVP: Zach O'Brien (Newfoundland)

Kelly Cup
- Champions: Newfoundland Growlers
- Runners-up: Toledo Walleye

ECHL seasons
- 2017–18 2019–20

The 2018–19 ECHL season was the 31st season of the ECHL. The regular season was scheduled to run from October 12, 2018, to April 7, 2019, with the Kelly Cup playoffs to follow. Twenty-seven teams in 20 states and two Canadian provinces each play a 72-game schedule. The Kelly Cup was won by the Newfoundland Growlers in their inaugural season over the Toledo Walleye.

== League business ==
=== League changes ===
After serving as league commissioner for 16 seasons, Brian McKenna, stepped down from the position following the 2017–18 season. He was replaced by Ryan Crelin, who had most recently been serving as the ECHL's chief operating officer.

=== Team changes ===
- The Colorado Eagles ownership left the ECHL, bought an expansion franchise and joined the American Hockey League as the affiliate of the Colorado Avalanche to bring the AHL up to 31 teams to match the size of the National Hockey League to continue the one-to-one NHL/AHL affiliations.
- The Maine Mariners in Portland, Maine, were added after purchasing the franchise from the folded Alaska Aces. The Mariners were the fifth team to replace a recently relocated American Hockey League (AHL) team, in this case the Portland Pirates, since 2015.
- The Newfoundland Growlers in St. John's, Newfoundland and Labrador, were added, replacing the recently relocated St. John's IceCaps and becoming the sixth ECHL team to replace an AHL team since 2015.
- The Quad City Mallards ceased operations after the 2017–18 season. The Mallards were the first of the teams added in the 2014 merger with the Central Hockey League to cease operations.

=== Conference realignment ===
As the new ECHL teams in Portland, Maine, and St. John's, Newfoundland and Labrador, were added to the North Division of the Eastern Conference, the Wheeling Nailers were moved to the Western Conference and Central Division. With the Colorado Eagles joining the American Hockey League, the Kansas City Mavericks moved back to the Mountain Division from the Central.

=== Affiliation changes ===
ECHL team	New affiliates	Former affiliates
Allen Americans	Minnesota Wild (NHL); Iowa Wild (AHL)	San Jose Sharks (NHL); San Jose Barracuda (AHL)
Brampton Beast	Ottawa Senators (NHL); Belleville Senators (AHL)	Montreal Canadiens (NHL); Laval Rocket (AHL)
Fort Wayne Komets	Vegas Golden Knights (NHL); Chicago Wolves (AHL)	Arizona Coyotes (NHL); Tucson Roadrunners (AHL)
Greenville Swamp Rabbits	Independent	New York Rangers (NHL); Hartford Wolf Pack (AHL)
Maine Mariners	New York Rangers (NHL); Hartford Wolf Pack (AHL)	Dormant
Newfoundland Growlers	Toronto Maple Leafs (NHL); Toronto Marlies (AHL)	Expansion team
Norfolk Admirals	Arizona Coyotes (NHL); Tucson Roadrunners (AHL)	Independent
Orlando Solar Bears	Tampa Bay Lightning (NHL); Syracuse Crunch (AHL)	Toronto Maple Leafs (NHL); Toronto Marlies (AHL)
Tulsa Oilers	San Antonio Rampage (AHL)	No AHL affiliate
Rapid City Rush	Independent	Minnesota Wild (NHL); Iowa Wild (AHL)
Utah Grizzlies	Colorado Avalanche (NHL); Colorado Eagles (AHL)	Anaheim Ducks (NHL); San Diego Gulls (AHL)

=== Annual Board of Governors meeting ===
The annual ECHL Board of Governors meeting was held at the New York-New York Hotel and Casino in Las Vegas, Nevada, from June 18 to 22, 2018.

=== All-star game ===
The 2019 CCM/ECHL All-Star Classic was held on January 21, 2019, at the Huntington Center in Toledo, Ohio. The All-Star Classic retained the four team, 3-on-3 player tournament style used the previous season, but featured two teams made from the Toledo Walleye (named Team Hooks and Team Fins) and one team for each conference's All-Star players. In the round-robin, the Western Conference and Team Fins each went 2–1, while the Eastern Conference and Team Hooks went 1–2. In the semifinal round, the Eastern Conference defeated the Western Conference 4–3 and Team Fins defeated the Team Hooks 3–1. The Eastern Conference All-Star team then defeated Team Fins 2–1 following a shootout. The Brampton Beast's David Pacan was named the tournament's Most Valuable Player.

The skills competition took place in between rounds of the tournament. The Toledo Walleye's Bryan Moore won the fastest skater event, the Walleye's A.J. Jenks won the hardest shot event, and the Brampton Beast's David Pacan won the accuracy shooting event.

== Standings ==
Final standings:

Eastern Conference

North Division	GP	W	L	OTL	SOL	GF	GA	PTS
y – Newfoundland Growlers (TOR)	72	43	21	4	4	258	207	94
x – Adirondack Thunder (NJD)	72	37	26	6	3	234	220	83
x – Manchester Monarchs (LAK)	72	39	29	2	2	233	232	82
x – Brampton Beast (OTT)	72	36	29	5	2	241	217	79
Reading Royals (PHI)	72	34	28	4	6	229	229	78
Maine Mariners (NYR)	72	37	32	2	1	221	247	77
Worcester Railers (NYI)	72	32	29	7	4	196	226	75

South Division	GP	W	L	OTL	SOL	GF	GA	PTS
y – Florida Everblades (CAR)	72	50	16	5	1	276	181	106
x – Orlando Solar Bears (TBL)	72	41	25	5	1	251	238	88
x – South Carolina Stingrays (WSH)	72	35	31	5	1	221	223	76
x – Jacksonville Icemen (WPG)	72	36	32	2	2	198	217	76
Atlanta Gladiators (BOS)	72	31	30	8	3	197	211	73
Norfolk Admirals (ARI)	72	27	36	6	3	218	278	63
Greenville Swamp Rabbits (Ind.)	72	25	41	3	3	192	254	56

Western Conference

Central Division	GP	W	L	OTL	SOL	GF	GA	PTS
z – Cincinnati Cyclones (BUF)	72	51	13	5	3	282	176	110
x – Toledo Walleye (DET)	72	40	23	6	3	237	221	89
x – Fort Wayne Komets (VGK)	72	36	26	4	6	233	248	82
x – Kalamazoo Wings (VAN)	72	36	31	2	3	229	254	77
Indy Fuel (CHI)	72	35	32	2	3	230	247	75
Wheeling Nailers (PIT)	72	31	31	6	4	239	240	72

Mountain Division	GP	W	L	OTL	SOL	GF	GA	PTS
y – Tulsa Oilers (STL)	72	42	24	4	2	236	198	90
x – Idaho Steelheads (DAL)	72	41	25	4	2	241	203	88
x – Utah Grizzlies (COL)	72	37	26	4	5	232	218	83
x – Kansas City Mavericks (CGY)	72	36	30	4	2	234	228	78
Wichita Thunder (EDM)	72	29	31	9	3	224	251	70
Rapid City Rush (Ind.)	72	30	33	5	4	168	225	69
Allen Americans (MIN)	72	25	41	4	2	208	269	56

x - clinched playoff spot, y - clinched regular season division title, z - Brabham Cup (regular season) champion

== Statistical leaders ==
=== Scoring leaders ===
The following players are sorted by points, then goals.

GP = Games played; G = Goals; A = Assists; Pts = Points; PIM = Penalty minutes

Player	Team	GP	G	A	Pts	PIM
Jesse Schultz	Cincinnati Cyclones	71	22	58	80	20
Adam Pleskach	Tulsa Oilers	72	38	37	75	74
Chris McCarthy	Reading Royals	72	20	54	74	23
Caleb Herbert	Utah Grizzlies	60	32	39	71	88
David Pacan	Brampton Beast	72	28	41	70	42
James Henry	Adirondack Thunder	72	15	54	69	63
Zach O'Brien	Newfoundland Growlers	53	28	40	68	6
Andrew Cherniwchan	South Carolina Stingrays	72	29	38	67	129
Zac Lynch	Wheeling Nailers	67	17	50	67	100
Myles Powell	Cincinnati Cyclones	57	31	35	66	24

=== Leading goaltenders ===
GP = Games played; TOI = Time on ice (in minutes); SA = Shots against; GA = Goals against; SO = Shutouts; GAA = Goals against average; SV% = Save percentage; W = Wins; L = Losses; OTL = Overtime/shootout loss

Player	Team	GP	TOI	SA	GA	SO	GAA	SV%	W	L	OTL
Devin Williams	Tulsa Oilers	34	1950	826	69	2	2.12	.916	20	9	4
Michael Houser	Cincinnati Cyclones	41	2394	1085	85	2	2.13	.922	29	7	5
Tomas Sholl	Idaho Steelheads	39	2324	1212	87	3	2.25	.928	26	12	1
Jeremy Helvig	Florida Everblades	39	2304	1064	87	3	2.27	.918	27	6	4
Evan Buitenhuis	Worcester Railers	28	1518	828	60	1	2.37	.928	10	9	4

== Postseason ==
=== Playoffs format ===
At the end of the regular season, the top four teams in each division qualifies for the 2019 Kelly Cup playoffs and be seeded one through four based on highest point total earned in the season. Then the first two rounds of the playoffs are held within the division with the first seed facing the fourth seed and the second seed facing the third. The division champions then play each other in a conference championship. The Kelly Cup finals pits the Eastern Conference champion against the Western Conference champion. All four rounds are a best-of-seven format.

=== Bracket ===
Division Semifinals	Division Finals
N1	Newfoundland Growlers	4
N4	Brampton Beast	2
N1	Newfoundland Growlers	4
North Division
N3	Manchester Monarchs	2
N2	Adirondack Thunder	1
N3	Manchester Monarchs	4
Eastern Conference
S1	Florida Everblades	4
S4	Jacksonville Icemen	2
S1	Florida Everblades	4
South Division
S2	Orlando Solar Bears	1
S2	Orlando Solar Bears	4
S3	South Carolina Stingrays	1
C1	Cincinnati Cyclones	4
C4	Kalamazoo Wings	2
C1	Cincinnati Cyclones	1
Central Division
C2	Toledo Walleye	4
C2	Toledo Walleye	4
C3	Fort Wayne Komets	2
Western Conference
M1	Tulsa Oilers	4
M4	Kansas City Mavericks	3
M1	Tulsa Oilers	4
Mountain Division
M2	Idaho Steelheads	2
M2	Idaho Steelheads	4
M3	Utah Grizzlies	1

Conference Finals
N1	Newfoundland Growlers	4
S1	Florida Everblades	1
C2	Toledo Walleye	4
M1	Tulsa Oilers	3

Kelly Cup Finals
N1	Newfoundland Growlers	4
C2	Toledo Walleye	2

== Awards ==
Award	Winner
Patrick Kelly Cup:	Newfoundland Growlers
Henry Brabham Cup:	Cincinnati Cyclones
Gingher Memorial Trophy:	Newfoundland Growlers
Bruce Taylor Trophy:	Toledo Walleye
John Brophy Award:	Matt Thomas, Cincinnati
CCM Most Valuable Player:	Jesse Schultz, Cincinnati
Kelly Cup Playoffs Most Valuable Player:	Zach O'Brien, Newfoundland
Warrior Hockey Goaltender of the Year:	Michael Houser, Cincinnati
CCM Rookie of the Year:	Chris Collins, Kalamazoo
CCM Defenseman of the Year:	Eric Knodel, Cincinnati
Leading Scorer:	Jesse Schultz, Cincinnati
AMI Graphics Plus Performer Award:	Joe Cox, Florida
Sportsmanship Award:	Zach O'Brien, Newfoundland
Community Service Award:	James Henry, Adirondack
Birmingham Memorial Award:	Patrick Richardson

=== All-ECHL teams ===
First Team

- Michael Houser (G) – Cincinnati Cyclones
- Eric Knodel (D) – Cincinnati Cyclones
- Matt Petgrave (D) – Brampton Beast
- Caleb Herbert (F) – Utah Grizzlies
- Adam Pleskach (F) – Tulsa Oilers
- Jesse Schultz (F) – Cincinnati Cyclones

Second Team

- Tomas Sholl (G) – Idaho Steelheads
- Matt Register (D) – Toledo Walleye
- Derek Sheppard (D) – Florida Everblades
- Joe Cox (F) – Florida Everblades
- Chris McCarthy (F) – Reading Royals
- Zach O'Brien (F) – Newfoundland Growlers

Rookie Team

- Tomas Sholl (G) – Idaho Steelheads
- Alex Breton (D) – Allen Americans
- Derek Sheppard (D) – Florida Everblades
- Chris Collins (F) – Kalamazoo Wings
- Steven Iacobellis (F) – Wichita Thunder
- Myles Powell (F) – Cincinnati Cyclones

== See also ==
- List of ECHL seasons
- 2018 in sports
- 2019 in sports
