= 1999–2000 ECHL season =

Ice hockey league season

- League: ECHL
- Sport: Ice hockey
- Duration: October 1999 – May 31, 2000

Regular season
- Brabham Cup: Florida Everblades

Kelly Cup Playoffs
- Northern champions: Peoria Rivermen
- Northern runners-up: Trenton Titans
- Southern champions: Louisiana IceGators
- Southern runners-up: Greenville Grrrowl

Kelly Cup Finals
- Champions: Peoria Rivermen
- Runners-up: Louisiana IceGators

ECHL seasons
- 1998–99 2000–01

The 1999–2000 ECHL season was the 12th season of the ECHL. Before the start of the season, the Miami Matadors and Columbus Chill suspended operations, the Chesapeake Icebreakers, who originally suspended operations, moved to Jackson, Mississippi. The league also welcomed expansion franchises in North Little Rock, Arkansas and Trenton, New Jersey, as well as welcoming back a franchise in the former market of Greensboro, North Carolina. The New Orleans Brass moved into the New New Orleans Arena. The league also created a new individual award, the Plus Performer Award, to be awarded to the player who leads the league in plus-minus rating at the end of the regular season. The Florida Everblades finished first overall in the regular season, winning the Brabham Cup and the Peoria Rivermen won their first Kelly Cup, defeating the Louisiana IceGators four games to two.

== Regular season ==
=== Final standings ===
Note: GP = Games played; W = Wins; L= Losses; T = Ties; GF = Goals for; GA = Goals against; Pts = Points; Green shade = Clinched playoff spot; Blue shade = Clinched division; (z) = Clinched home-ice advantage

==== Northern Conference ====
Northeast Division	GP	W	L	OTL	Pts	GF	GA
Roanoke Express	70	44	20	6	94	221	181
Richmond Renegades	70	44	21	5	93	258	205
Hampton Roads Admirals	70	44	22	4	92	241	198
Trenton Titans	70	37	29	4	78	233	199
Charlotte Checkers	70	25	38	7	57	186	254
Greensboro Generals	70	20	43	7	47	229	337

Northwest Division	GP	W	L	OTL	Pts	GF	GA
Peoria Rivermen	70	45	20	5	95	273	216
Huntington Blizzard	70	35	25	10	80	230	238
Johnstown Chiefs	70	33	28	9	75	235	234
Dayton Bombers	70	32	28	10	74	230	226
Wheeling Nailers	70	25	40	5	55	202	246
Toledo Storm	70	22	41	7	51	214	306

==== Southern Conference ====
Southeast Division	GP	W	L	OTL	Pts	GF	GA
Florida Everblades	70	53	15	2	108	277	181
Pee Dee Pride	70	47	18	5	99	233	175
Greenville Grrrowl	70	46	18	6	98	277	198
South Carolina Stingrays	70	35	25	10	80	253	242
Augusta Lynx	70	34	31	5	73	243	248
Tallahassee Tiger Sharks	70	31	33	6	68	256	261
Jacksonville Lizard Kings	70	27	34	9	63	246	291

Southwest Division	GP	W	L	OTL	Pts	GF	GA
Louisiana IceGators	70	43	18	9	95	281	241
Mobile Mysticks	70	40	28	2	82	275	230
New Orleans Brass	70	36	27	7	79	230	219
Mississippi Sea Wolves	70	35	27	8	78	241	221
Pensacola Ice Pilots	70	35	29	6	76	215	216
Baton Rouge Kingfish	70	33	32	5	71	253	277
Jackson Bandits	70	32	32	6	70	201	227
Birmingham Bulls	70	29	37	4	62	255	297
Arkansas RiverBlades	70	18	49	3	39	192	316

== Kelly Cup playoffs ==
=== Northern Conference ===
==== Bracket ====
Conference Quarterfinals (Best of 5)
1	Peoria	3
8	Dayton	0
2	Roanoke	1
7	Johnstown	3
3	Richmond	0
6	Trenton	3
4	Hampton Roads	3
5	Huntington	2

Conference Semifinals (Best of 5)
1	Peoria	3
7	Johnstown	0
6	Trenton	3
4	Hampton Roads	2

Conference Finals (Best of 7)
1	Peoria	4
6	Trenton	2

==== Quarterfinals ====
(1) Peoria vs. (8) Dayton
Date	Away	Home	
April 3	Dayton 2	Peoria 6	
April 5	Dayton 2	Peoria 3	OT
April 6	Peoria 4	Dayton 3	
Peoria wins series 3–0

(2) Roanoke vs. (7) Johnstown
Date	Away	Home
April 4	Johnstown 3	Roanoke 0
April 5	Roanoke 4	Johnstown 3
April 7	Roanoke 0	Johnstown 4
April 8	Johnstown 4	Roanoke 1
Johnstown wins series 3–1

(3) Richmond vs. (6) Trenton
Date	Away	Home
April 6	Trenton 4	Richmond 2
April 8	Trenton 3	Richmond 0
April 9	Richmond 0	Trenton 2
Trenton wins series 3–0

(4) Hampton Roads vs. (5) Huntington
Date	Away	Home
April 5	Huntington 4	Hampton Roads 0
April 7	Huntington 1	Hampton Roads 7
April 9	Hampton Roads 6	Huntington 4
April 10	Hampton Roads 0	Huntington 3
April 12	Huntington 2	Hampton Roads 3
Hampton Roads wins series 3–2

==== Semifinals ====
(1) Peoria vs. (7) Johnstown
Date	Away	Home	
April 16	Johnstown 3	Peoria 4	OT
April 18	Johnstown 4	Peoria 7	
April 21	Peoria 2	Johnstown 1	
Peoria wins series 3–0

(4) Hampton Roads vs. (6) Trenton
Date	Away	Home	
April 16	Trenton 0	Hampton Roads 1	
April 18	Trenton 3	Hampton Roads 2	2OT
April 20	Hampton Roads 4	Trenton 3	
April 22	Hampton Roads 3	Trenton 6	
April 24	Trenton 4	Hampton Roads 2	
Trenton wins series 3–2

==== Finals ====
(1) Peoria vs. (6) Trenton
Date	Away	Home	
April 30	Trenton 6	Peoria 7	
May 2	Trenton 2	Peoria 7	
May 4	Peoria 1	Trenton 2	OT
May 5	Peoria 5	Trenton 2	
May 7	Peoria 1	Trenton 3	
May 10	Trenton 2	Peoria 5	
Peoria wins series 4–2

=== Southern Conference ===
==== Bracket ====
Conference Wild Card (Best of 3)
7	New Orleans	1
10	Augusta	2
6	South Carolina	2
11	Baton Rouge	0
8	Mississippi	2
9	Pensacola	1

Conference Quarterfinals (Best of 5)
1	Florida	2
10	Augusta	3
4	Greenville	3
5	Mobile	2
3	Pee Dee	2
6	South Carolina	3
2	Louisiana	3
8	Mississippi	1

Conference Semifinals (Best of 5)
10	Augusta	1
4	Greenville	3
6	South Carolina	0
2	Louisiana	3

Conference Finals (Best of 7)
4	Greenville	2
2	Louisiana	4

==== Wild Card ====
(6) South Carolina vs. (11) Baton Rouge
Date	Away	Home	
April 4	Baton Rouge 2	South Carolina 6	
April 5	South Carolina 5	Baton Rouge 4	OT
South Carolina wins series 2–0

(7) New Orleans vs. (10) Augusta
Date	Away	Home	
April 3	Augusta 1	New Orleans 2	OT
April 5	New Orleans 1	Augusta 2	OT
April 7	Augusta 5	New Orleans 2	
Augusta wins series 2–1

(8) Mississippi vs. (9) Pensacola
Date	Away	Home
April 4	Pensacola 2	Mississippi 1
April 5	Mississippi 4	Pensacola 2
April 7	Mississippi 4	Pensacola 0
Mississippi wins series 2–1

==== Quarterfinals ====
(1) Florida vs. (10) Augusta
Date	Away	Home
April 8	Augusta 3	Florida 1
April 10	Augusta 3	Florida 5
April 16	Florida 4	Augusta 3
April 17	Florida 2	Augusta 4
April 19	Augusta 4	Florida 2
Augusta wins series 3–2

(2) Louisiana vs. (8) Mississippi
Date	Away	Home	
April 9	Mississippi 2	Louisiana 3	
April 11	Mississippi 3	Louisiana 7	
April 12	Louisiana 2	Mississippi 3	2OT
April 17	Louisiana 4	Mississippi 2	
Louisiana wins series 3–1

(3) Pee Dee vs. (6) South Carolina
Date	Away	Home	
April 8	South Carolina 3	Pee Dee 2	
April 11	Pee Dee 5	South Carolina 1	
April 13	South Carolina 2	Pee Dee 3	
April 14	Pee Dee 1	South Carolina 8	
April 15	South Carolina 4	Pee Dee 3	OT
South Carolina wins series 3–2

(4) Greenville vs. (5) Mobile
Date	Away	Home
April 10	Mobile 4	Greenville 1
April 11	Mobile 3	Greenville 6
April 14	Greenville 4	Mobile 5
April 15	Greenville 5	Mobile 1
April 16	Mobile 2	Greenville 5
Greenville wins series 3–2

==== Semifinals ====
(4) Greenville vs. (10) Augusta
Date	Away	Home	
April 24	Augusta 1	Greenville 2	
April 25	Augusta 2	Greenville 4	
April 27	Greenville 3	Augusta 4	OT
April 28	Greenville 4	Augusta 0	
Greenville wins series 3–1

(2) Louisiana vs. (6) South Carolina
Date	Away	Home
April 21	South Carolina 2	Louisiana 4
April 22	South Carolina 3	Louisiana 6
April 25	Louisiana 8	South Carolina 3
Louisiana wins series 3–0

==== Finals ====
(2) Louisiana vs. (4) Greenville
Date	Away	Home	
May 3	Louisiana 4	Greenville 5	
May 5	Louisiana 2	Greenville 3	4OT
May 6	Greenville 4	Louisiana 6	
May 9	Greenville 5	Louisiana 6	OT
May 10	Greenville 3	Louisiana 6	
May 13	Louisiana 4	Greenville 0	
Louisiana wins series 4–2

=== Kelly Cup finals ===
Kelly Cup finals
N.1	Peoria	4
S.2	Louisiana	2

(N.1) Peoria vs. (S.2) Louisiana
Date	Away	Home	
May 19	Louisiana 5	Peoria 3	
May 20	Louisiana 4	Peoria 2	
May 24	Peoria 5	Louisiana 4	2OT
May 25	Peoria 4	Louisiana 2	
May 28	Peoria 6	Louisiana 5	2OT
May 31	Louisiana 3	Peoria 4	OT
Peoria wins series 4–2

== ECHL awards ==
Patrick J. Kelly Cup:	Peoria Rivermen
Henry Brabham Cup:	Florida Everblades
Northern Conference Champion:	Peoria Rivermen
Southern Conference Champion:	Louisiana IceGators
John Brophy Award:	Bob Ferguson (Florida)
ECHL Most Valuable Player:	Andrew Williamson (Toledo)
Kelly Cup Playoffs Most Valuable Player:	J. F. Boutin and Jason Christie (Peoria)
ECHL Goaltender of the Year:	Jan Lasak (Hampton Roads)
ECHL Rookie of the Year:	Jan Lasak (Hampton Roads)
Defenseman of the Year:	Tom Nemeth (Dayton)
Leading Scorer:	John Spoltore (Louisiana)
Plus Performer Award:	Andy MacIntyre (Florida)
Sportsmanship Award:	Jamie Ling (Dayton)

== See also ==
- ECHL All-Star Game
- List of ECHL seasons
- 1999 in sports
- 2000 in sports
