= 1995–96 ECHL season =

Ice hockey league season

The 1995–96 ECHL season was the eighth season of the ECHL. Before the season started, the Greensboro Monarchs franchise moved up to the American Hockey League and became the Carolina Monarchs. The league saw the addition of four new teams for the 1995–96 season, which included the relocation of the Louisville IceHawks to Jacksonville, FL and expansion franchises in Laffayette, LA and Mobile, AL, as well as a return to Louisville, KY, bringing the number of teams in the league to twenty-one. With the increase in the number of teams the league decided to increase the number of games played in the regular season from 68 to 70. The Richmond Renegades finished first overall in the regular season, winning the Brabham Cup and the Charlotte Checkers won their first Riley Cup sweeping the Jacksonville Lizard Kings in four games.

== Regular season ==
Note: GP = Games played, W = Wins, L = Losses, SOL = Shootout losses, Pts = Points, GF = Goals for, GA = Goals against, Green shade = Clinched playoff spot, Blue shade = Clinched division

East Division	GP	W	L	SOL	Pts	GF	GA
Richmond Renegades	70	46	11	13	105	314	225
Charlotte Checkers	70	45	21	4	94	294	250
South Carolina Stingrays	70	40	22	8	88	284	251
Roanoke Express	70	36	28	6	78	231	260
Hampton Roads Admirals	70	32	15	13	77	278	265
Raleigh Icecaps	70	23	34	13	59	215	266

North Division	GP	W	L	SOL	Pts	GF	GA
Toledo Storm	70	48	14	8	104	301	240
Wheeling Thunderbirds	70	42	23	5	89	289	261
Louisville RiverFrogs	70	39	24	7	85	266	237
Columbus Chill	70	37	28	5	79	285	268
Dayton Bombers	70	35	28	7	77	247	237
Erie Panthers	70	25	40	5	55	227	293
Johnstown Chiefs	70	21	38	11	53	249	322
Huntington Blizzard	70	21	39	10	52	232	309

South Division	GP	W	L	OTL	Pts	GF	GA
Louisiana IceGators	70	43	21	6	92	312	261
Nashville Knights	70	42	22	6	90	368	307
Tallahassee Tiger Sharks	70	42	22	6	90	283	260
Knoxville Cherokees	70	37	29	4	78	323	303
Jacksonville Lizard Kings	70	33	29	8	74	267	288
Birmingham Bulls	70	26	39	5	57	258	360
Mobile Mysticks	70	22	37	11	55	265	325

== Riley Cup playoffs ==
=== Bracket ===
First Round (Best of 5)
Richmond	3
Hampton Roads	2
Louisiana	0
Jacksonville	3
Toledo	3
Dayton	0
Nashville	1
Knoxville	3
Charlotte	3
Roanoke	0
South Carolina	3
Louisville	0
Tallahassee	3
Raleigh	1
Wheeling	3
Columbus	0

Quarterfinals (Best of 5)
Richmond	0
Jacksonville	3
Toledo	3
Knoxville	0
Charlotte	3
South Carolina	0
Tallahassee	3
Wheeling	1

Semifinals (Best of 5)
Jacksonville	3
Toledo	2
Charlotte	3
Tallahassee	0

Finals (Best of 7)
Jacksonville	0
Charlotte	4

== ECHL awards ==
Jack Riley Cup:	Charlotte Checkers
Henry Brabham Cup:	Richmond Renegades
John Brophy Award:	Roy Sommer (Richmond)
ECHL Most Valuable Player:	Hugo Belanger (Nashville)
Riley Cup Playoffs Most Valuable Player:	Nick Vitucci (Charlotte)
ECHL Goaltender of the Year:	Alain Morissette (Louisville)
ECHL Rookie of the Year:	Keli Corpse (Wheeling)
Defenseman of the Year:	Chris Valicevic (Louisiana)
Leading Scorer:	Hugo Belanger (Nashville)

== See also ==
- ECHL All-Star Game
- Kelly Cup
- List of ECHL seasons
- 1995 in sports
- 1996 in sports
