= 2019–20 ECHL season =

Ice hockey league season

- League: ECHL
- Sport: Ice hockey
- Duration: October 11, 2019 – March 11, 2020
- Total attendance: 3,449,348
- Average attendance: 4,327

Regular season
- Brabham Cup: Not awarded
- Season MVP: Josh Kestner (Toledo)
- Top scorer: Josh Kestner (Toledo)

ECHL seasons
- 2018–19 2020–21

The 2019–20 ECHL season was the 32nd season of the ECHL. The regular season began in October 2019 to and was set to conclude in April 2020 with the Kelly Cup playoffs to follow. Twenty-six teams in 19 states and two Canadian provinces were each scheduled for 72 games.

On March 12, 2020, the league announced that the season has been suspended due to the COVID-19 pandemic. On March 14, the league cancelled the remainder of the season.

The league did not award the regular season trophy, as the AHL had done following the pandemic termination, because of a league rule regarding regular-season bonuses paid to the league champion from the playoff revenue pool. The South Carolina Stingrays were unofficially league regular-season champions at 92 points (44-14-4, .742 winning percentage), with 38 wins in regulation, as they were tied with the Florida Everblades (43-13-6, .742 winning percentage), which had 37 wins in regulation.

== League business ==
=== Team changes ===
- The Manchester Monarchs ceased operations after four seasons in the league following the 2015 AHL/ECHL franchise swap that was part of the creation of the AHL's Pacific Division. The Monarchs' owners had put the team up for sale during their final season, but failed to find new owners and the franchise was terminated by the league.

=== Affiliation changes ===
ECHL team	New affiliates	Former affiliates
Florida Everblades	Nashville Predators (NHL); Milwaukee Admirals (AHL)	Carolina Hurricanes (NHL); Charlotte Checkers (AHL)
Greenville Swamp Rabbits	Carolina Hurricanes (NHL); Charlotte Checkers (AHL)	Independent
Norfolk Admirals	Independent	Arizona Coyotes (NHL); Tucson Roadrunners (AHL)
Rapid City Rush	Arizona Coyotes (NHL); Tucson Roadrunners (AHL)	Independent

=== Annual Board of Governors meeting ===
The annual ECHL Board of Governors meeting was held at the New York-New York Hotel and Casino in Las Vegas from June 17 to 21, 2019. The Board approved of a rule change extending overtime from five minutes to seven minutes in the same three-on-three sudden death format used since the 2015–16 season. In addition, the Board approved a rule change for the 2020 Kelly Cup Playoffs regarding players on NHL or AHL contracts. Should such player have played 260 or more regular season games, they must have played a minimum of five games in the AHL that season in order to be eligible for the ECHL Kelly Cup Playoffs. The rule does not apply for players on ECHL contracts.

The league also added the AHL's fighting major counter rule, where a player is suspended one game for the 10th to 13th fighting major, and two games for the 14th and subsequent fighting majors (excluding when the opposing fighter is charged with an instigator penalty).

=== All-star game ===
The 2020 ECHL All-Star Game was held on January 22, 2020, at the Intrust Bank Arena in Wichita, Kansas. The All-Star Classic retained the four team, 3-on-3 player tournament style used the previous season, including two teams made from the Wichita Thunder (named Team Bolts and Team Hammers) and one team for each conference's All-Star players. In addition to the ECHL All-Star players, each team also had a player from the Professional Women's Hockey Players Association with Dani Cameranesi, Kali Flanagan, Gigi Marvin, and Annie Pankowski taking part in the festivities.

In the round-robin, the Team Bolts went 2–0–1, Team Hammers went 1–1–1, and both conferences went 1–2–0. The skills competition took place in between rounds of the tournament. The Tulsa Oilers' J.J. Piccinich won the fastest skater event, the Idaho Steelheads' Brady Norrish won the hardest shot event, and the Atlanta Gladiators' Tommy Marchin won the accuracy shooting event. The results of the skills competition re-seeded the teams for the semifinal round where the Eastern Conference tied Team Bolts 4–4 and the Western Conference defeated the Team Hammers 4–1. The Eastern Conference All-Star team then defeated the Western Conference 4–2. The Florida Everblades' Logan Roe was named the tournament's Most Valuable Player.

== Standings ==
Final standings

Eastern Conference

North Division	GP	W	L	OTL	SOL	GF	GA	PTS
x – Newfoundland Growlers (TOR)	60	42	17	0	1	240	177	85
x – Reading Royals (PHI)	60	37	17	5	1	218	176	80
Brampton Beast (OTT)	62	34	25	3	0	229	206	71
Maine Mariners (NYR)	62	32	26	3	1	182	186	68
Adirondack Thunder (NJD)	63	22	28	8	5	197	219	57
Worcester Railers (NYI)	61	21	36	4	0	161	230	46

South Division	GP	W	L	OTL	SOL	GF	GA	PTS
x – South Carolina Stingrays (WSH)	62	44	14	3	1	216	147	92
x – Florida Everblades (NSH)	62	43	13	4	2	227	156	92
Greenville Swamp Rabbits (CAR)	64	29	30	4	1	210	226	63
Atlanta Gladiators (BOS)	61	29	28	2	2	200	230	62
Orlando Solar Bears (TBL)	62	27	29	5	1	170	180	60
Jacksonville Icemen (WPG)	60	24	29	6	1	173	206	55
Norfolk Admirals (Ind.)	60	14	38	8	0	149	248	36

Western Conference

Central Division	GP	W	L	OTL	SOL	GF	GA	PTS
x – Cincinnati Cyclones (BUF)	63	38	17	7	1	196	161	84
Toledo Walleye (DET)	59	37	17	4	1	225	163	79
Fort Wayne Komets (VGK)	62	31	23	6	2	218	220	70
Indy Fuel (CHI)	60	30	26	2	2	195	175	64
Kalamazoo Wings (VAN)	61	23	30	7	1	194	241	54
Wheeling Nailers (PIT)	59	24	30	5	0	163	206	53

Mountain Division	GP	W	L	OTL	SOL	GF	GA	PTS
x – Allen Americans (MIN)	62	40	14	6	2	247	195	88
Idaho Steelheads (DAL)	61	36	18	3	4	168	155	79
Utah Grizzlies (COL)	62	34	17	7	4	207	164	79
Tulsa Oilers (STL)	63	29	26	7	1	199	196	66
Rapid City Rush (ARI)	60	29	25	5	1	181	200	64
Wichita Thunder (EDM)	62	24	30	8	0	181	233	56
Kansas City Mavericks (CGY)	61	24	32	4	1	167	217	53

x - clinched playoff spot, y - clinched regular season division title, z - Brabham Cup (regular season) champion

== Postseason ==
2020 Kelly Cup playoffs

At the end of the regular season, the top four teams in each division would have qualified for the 2020 Kelly Cup playoffs and be seeded one through four based on highest point total earned in the season. However, as the season was cancelled due to the coronavirus pandemic, the playoffs were not held. At the time of the cancellation, six teams had already clinched playoff berths: the Allen Americans, Cincinnati Cyclones, Florida Everblades, Newfoundland Growlers, Reading Royals, and South Carolina Stingrays.

== Awards ==
Due to the season being abbreviated, only individual regular season awards were given as the team-based awards from the regular season were not awarded, unlike the AHL (which awarded the regular season trophy).

Award	Winner
Patrick Kelly Cup:	Not awarded
Henry Brabham Cup:	Not awarded (Note: The Professional Hockey Players Association and the ECHL Collective Bargaining Agreement state that the team that finishes first in the regular season is paid a fee from the league's playoff pool based on ticket revenue from playoffs. The South Carolina Stingrays were statistically the league champions, (44-14-4, 38 regular seasons wins) over the Florida Everblades (43-13-6, 37 regular season wins). Both teams had a .742 winning percentage (92 points in 62 games). The league decided not to offer the regular season trophy as the regular season bonus money is paid from the league's playoff pool.)
Gingher Memorial Trophy:	Not awarded
Bruce Taylor Trophy:	Not awarded
John Brophy Award:	Steve Bergin, South Carolina
Most Valuable Player:	Josh Kestner, Toledo
Kelly Cup Playoffs Most Valuable Player:	Not awarded
Goaltender of the Year:	Tomas Sholl, Idaho
Rookie of the Year:	Tyler Sheehy, Allen
Defenseman of the Year:	Alex Breton, Allen
Leading Scorer:	Josh Kestner, Toledo
Plus Performer Award:	Ben Masella, Florida
Sportsmanship Award:	Spencer Watson, Indy
Community Service Award:	Connor Doherty, Worcester

=== All-ECHL teams ===
First Team

- Tomas Sholl (G) – Idaho Steelheads
- Alex Breton (D) – Allen Americans
- Logan Roe (D) – Florida Everblades
- Josh Kestner (F) – Toledo Walleye
- Tyler Sheehy (F) – Allen Americans
- David Vallorini (F) – Brampton Beast

Second Team

- Parker Milner (G) – South Carolina Stingrays
- Eric Knodel (D) – Reading Royals
- Miles Liberati (D) – Tulsa Oilers
- Brady Ferguson (F) – Newfoundland Growlers
- Tim McGauley (F) – Utah Grizzlies
- Jesse Schultz (F) – Cincinnati Cyclones

Rookie Team

- Billy Christopoulos (G) – Toledo Walleye
- Justin Baudry (D) – Cincinnati Cyclones
- Joseph Duszak (D) – Newfoundland Growlers
- Samuel Asselin (F) – Atlanta Gladiators
- Justin Brazeau (F) – Newfoundland Growlers
- Tyler Sheehy (F) – Allen Americans

== See also ==
- List of ECHL seasons
- 2019 in sports
- 2020 in sports
