= 2020–21 ECHL season =

Ice hockey league season

- League: ECHL
- Sport: Ice hockey
- Duration: December 11, 2020 – June 6, 2021

Regular season
- Brabham Cup: Florida Everblades
- Season MVP: Anthony Beauregard (Wichita)
- Top scorer: Aaron Luchuk (Orlando)

Playoffs
- Eastern champions: South Carolina Stingrays
- Eastern runners-up: Greenville Swamp Rabbits
- Western champions: Fort Wayne Komets
- Western runners-up: Allen Americans
- Playoffs MVP: Stephen Harper (Fort Wayne)

Kelly Cup
- Champions: Fort Wayne Komets
- Runners-up: South Carolina Stingrays

ECHL seasons
- 2019–20 2021–22

The 2020–21 ECHL season was the 33rd season of the ECHL. Due to the ongoing restrictions in the COVID-19 pandemic, the start of the regular season was pushed back to December 11, 2020.

The Fort Wayne Komets were the Kelly Cup champions, defeating the South Carolina Stingrays in four games.

== League business ==
Due to the uncertainty of being able to host games in some locations caused by the COVID-19 pandemic, several member teams had not been able to confirm participation in the 2020–21 season and the season start was postponed. In October 2020, thirteen teams confirmed plans to begin to play in December 2020 with others hoping to return in January 2021. All teams had a deadline to voluntarily opt out of the 2020–21 season by November 30, but two teams had been granted extensions: the Fort Wayne Komets and Toledo Walleye. The Komets and Walleye were then approved to postpone their start to February. The league announced its schedule through February 11, 2021.

By December 7, 2020, the other eleven teams had opted out from participating in the season and voluntarily suspended operations: the Adirondack Thunder, Atlanta Gladiators, Brampton Beast, Cincinnati Cyclones, Idaho Steelheads, Kalamazoo Wings, Maine Mariners, Newfoundland Growlers, Norfolk Admirals, Reading Royals, and Worcester Railers. On January 5, 2021, the league announced that Toledo had opted out of the season as well, but that Fort Wayne had finalized plans to start playing on February 12. The league announced a conference-based alignment and its schedule through April 4. The league announced a remainder of the schedule on February 10. Due to COVID-19 related postponements and teams' arenas availability, several games throughout the season were rescheduled or cancelled.

During the season, the Brampton Beast announced the team had ceased operations entirely on February 18, 2021.

=== Affiliation changes ===
ECHL team	New affiliates	Former affiliates
Fort Wayne Komets	Henderson Silver Knights (AHL)	Chicago Wolves (AHL)
Greenville Swamp Rabbits	Florida Panthers (NHL)	Carolina Hurricanes (NHL)
Tulsa Oilers	Anaheim Ducks (NHL); San Diego Gulls (AHL)	St. Louis Blues (NHL); Springfield Thunderbirds (AHL)

=== All-star game ===
During the previous season, the league had awarded the Jacksonville Icemen the 2021 All-Star Game, but the Jacksonville-hosted event was deferred to 2022.

== Standings ==
Due to the imbalanced schedule during the pandemic, teams are ranked on points percentage.

Final standings

Eastern Conference	GP	W	L	OTL	SOL	GF	GA	Pts	Pts%
z — Florida Everblades (NSH)	69	42	19	5	3	233	193	92	.667
x — Greenville Swamp Rabbits (FLA)	72	38	19	12	3	210	204	91	.632
x — Indy Fuel (CHI)	69	37	24	8	0	204	199	82	.594
x — South Carolina Stingrays (WSH)	70	34	23	10	3	216	212	81	.579
Orlando Solar Bears (TBL)	72	36	29	6	1	218	232	79	.549
Jacksonville Icemen (WPG)	71	34	30	3	4	205	212	75	.528
Wheeling Nailers (PIT)	68	22	39	6	1	196	241	51	.375

Western Conference	GP	W	L	OTL	SOL	GF	GA	Pts	Pts%
y — Allen Americans (MIN)	72	45	23	3	1	236	196	94	.653
x — Wichita Thunder (EDM)	71	41	22	6	2	218	190	90	.634
x — Fort Wayne Komets (VGK)	51	29	17	3	2	170	136	63	.618
x — Utah Grizzlies (COL)	72	35	26	5	6	207	219	81	.563
Tulsa Oilers (ANA)	72	30	28	11	3	180	203	74	.514
Kansas City Mavericks (CGY)	72	31	31	8	2	205	226	72	.500
Rapid City Rush (ARI)	71	32	35	3	1	197	232	68	.479

x – clinched playoff spot; y – clinched regular season conference title; z – Brabham Cup (regular season) champion

== Postseason ==
For the 2021 Kelly Cup playoffs, the top four teams from each conference at the end of the regular season qualified for the postseason. The playoff format is a three-round best-of-five tournament for each series. The postseason began on June 7.

=== Bracket ===
Final results.

Conference Semifinals
E1	Florida Everblades	2
E4	South Carolina Stingrays	3
Eastern Conference
E2	Greenville Swamp Rabbits	3
E3	Indy Fuel	1
W1	Allen Americans	3
W4	Utah Grizzlies	0
Western Conference
W2	Wichita Thunder	2
W3	Fort Wayne Komets	3

Conference Finals
E4	South Carolina Stingrays	3
E2	Greenville Swamp Rabbits	1
W1	Allen Americans	1
W3	Fort Wayne Komets	3

Kelly Cup Finals
E4	South Carolina Stingrays	1
W3	Fort Wayne Komets	3

== Awards ==
Award	Winner
Patrick Kelly Cup	Fort Wayne Komets
Henry Brabham Cup	Florida Everblades
Gingher Memorial Trophy	South Carolina Stingrays
Bruce Taylor Trophy	Fort Wayne Komets
John Brophy Award	Bruce Ramsay, Wichita
Most Valuable Player	Anthony Beauregard, Wichita
Kelly Cup Playoffs Most Valuable Player	Stephen Harper, Fort Wayne
Goaltender of the Year	Jake Hildebrand, Florida
Rookie of the Year	Matthew Boucher, Utah
Defenseman of the Year	Les Lancaster, Allen
Leading Scorer	Aaron Luchuk, Orlando
Plus Performer Award	John McCarron, Florida
Sportsmanship Award	Aaron Luchuk, Orlando
Community Service Award	

=== All-ECHL teams ===
==== First Team ====
- Jake Hildebrand (G) – Florida
- Samuel Jardine (D) – Greenville
- Les Lancaster (D) – Allen
- Anthony Beauregard (F) – Wichita
- Aaron Luchuk (F) – Orlando
- John McCarron (F) – Florida

==== Second Team ====
- Evan Buitenhuis (G) – Wichita
- Matt Register (D) – Allen
- Dean Stewart (D) – Wichita
- Tyler Coulter (F) – Rapid City
- Peter Quenneville (F) – Rapid City
- Cole Ully (F) – South Carolina

==== All-Rookie ====
- Evan Weninger (G) – Wichita
- Ben Finkelstein (D) – Greenville
- Dean Stewart (D) – Wichita
- Matthew Boucher (F) – Utah
- Jay Dickman (F) – Wichita
- Joseph Garreffa (F) – Orlando

== See also ==
- List of ECHL seasons
- 2020 in sports
- 2021 in sports
