= Ed Zawatsky =

Canadian ice hockey coach and general manager

- Born: Ed Zawatsky; June 18, 1968 (age 56); Langenburg, Saskatchewan, Canada
- Occupation(s): Former Head Coach and General Manager, Yorkton Terriers
- Years active: 2000-2010

Ed Zawatsky is the former head coach and general manager of the Yorkton Terriers Junior 'A' Hockey Team. He led the Terriers team to the SJHL championship, the Anavet Cup, in his rookie year, and was named SJHL Coach of the Year. He followed that up by taking the team to a second Anavet Cup, and into the final of the national championship, the RBC Cup.

Zawatsky began as an assistant coach in 2002-03 season. He manned the bench for three years as an understudy to Don Chesney. Zawatsky is a former Terrier himself and still holds the team’s single season scoring record.

He earned an NCAA Division 1 scholarship while playing junior hockey, and from Colorado College went to the American Hockey League, ECHL, and 9 seasons in Germany.
