= Ron Hansis =

American ice hockey player (born 1952)

- Born: November 12, 1952 (age 73) Brownsville, Texas, U.S.A.
- Height: 6 ft 2 in (188 cm)
- Weight: 195 lb (88 kg; 13 st 13 lb)
- Position: Right wing
- Shot: Right
- Played for: Houston Aeros
- Playing career: 1976–1986

Ronald Louis Hansis (born November 12, 1952) is a former professional ice hockey player who played 100 games in the World Hockey Association. He played for the Houston Aeros from 1976 to 1978.

Hansis was the long-time coach of the Erie Panthers of the East Coast Hockey League. He was named the inaugural recipient of the John Brophy Coach of the Year Award after the 1988–89 ECHL season, and was named to the league's 2nd All-Star Team after the next year. When the Panthers were moved to Baton Rouge, he was fired eleven games into the 1997–98 ECHL season.

His daughter, Taylor, pitches at Georgia Gwinnett College while his son, Donald, plays right field at Spartanburg Methodist College (as of 2019). Another daughter, Carly, played outfield at the College of Charleston from 2013 to 2016.

== Career statistics ==
=== Regular season and playoffs ===
			Regular season					Playoffs
Season	Team	League	GP	G	A	Pts	PIM	GP	G	A	Pts	PIM
1972–73	Loyola College	CIAU	Statistics Unavailable
1973–74	Concordia University	CIAU	35	11	17	28	40	––	––	––	––	––
1975–76	Concordia University	CIAU	Statistics Unavailable
1976–77	Oklahoma City Blazers	CHL	63	16	21	37	85	––	––	––	––	––
1976–77	Houston Aeros	WHA	22	4	3	7	6	8	1	1	2	4
1977–78	Houston Aeros	WHA	78	13	9	22	51	6	1	1	2	4
1978–79	Broome Dusters	AHL	13	1	1	2	0	––	––	––	––	––
1978–79	Erie Blades	NEHL	53	18	26	44	62	12	5	7	12	27
1979–80	Springfield Indians	AHL	1	0	1	1	0	––	––	––	––	––
1979–80	Erie Blades	EHL	56	22	39	61	52	9	5	8	13	32
1980–81	Rochester Americans	AHL	2	0	0	0	2	––	––	––	––	––
1980–81	Erie Blades	EHL	71	23	59	82	81	8	6	7	13	32
1981–82	Fort Wayne Komets	IHL	7	2	4	6	9	––	––	––	––	––
1981–82	Muskegon Mohawks	IHL	62	27	44	71	81	––	––	––	––	––
1981–82	Nashville South Stars	CHL	––	––	––	––	––	3	1	0	1	0
1982–83	Muskegon Mohawks	IHL	71	17	37	54	19	––	––	––	––	––
1982–83	Erie Golden Blades	ACHL	––	––	––	––	––	2	0	0	0	0
1983–84	Erie Golden Blades	ACHL	37	17	22	39	44	9	4	5	9	8
1984–85	Erie Golden Blades	ACHL	64	27	76	103	117	12	7	11	18	42
1985–86	Erie Golden Blades	ACHL	57	25	59	84	126	10	3	4	7	36
WHA totals			100	17	12	29	57	14	2	2	4	8
