= Toledo Storm =

- City: Toledo, Ohio
- League: ECHL
- Home arena: Toledo Sports Arena
- Colors: Red, White and Blue
- Media: Toledo Blade
- Affiliates: Detroit Red Wings (1991-1999, 2000-07); Nashville Predators (2002–04); San Jose Sharks (2005-07)

Franchise history
- 1991–2007: Toledo Storm
- 2009–present: Toledo Walleye

Championships
- Regular season titles: 2 (1991–92, 2002–03)
- Division titles: 6 (1991–92, 1992–93, 1993–94, 1995–96, 2002–03, 2005–06)
- Kelly Cups: 2 (1992–93, 1993–94)

The Toledo Storm were a minor league professional ice hockey team in the ECHL from 1991 to 2007. The Storm played their home games at the venerable Toledo Sports Arena along the eastern banks of the Maumee River in Toledo, Ohio. The team colors were red and white, similar to the Detroit Red Wings, their NHL affiliate for fourteen of their sixteen seasons. The Storm would win six division titles, two Henry Brabham Cups and two Jack Riley Cups as champion of the East Coast Hockey League. The franchise suspended operations following the 2006–07 season after they were sold to Toledo Arena Sports, Inc. The Storm returned to the ECHL for the 2009–10 season as the Toledo Walleye.

The Storm's logo was notorious for poor appearance, and was voted "Worst Logo" in The Hockey News annual survey of minor league hockey logos several times.

== History ==
=== McSorley era (1991–94) ===
The Toledo Storm were founded in 1991, joining the East Coast Hockey League for the 1991–92 season as an expansion franchise with two other Ohio franchises, the Columbus Chill and Dayton Bombers, and the Raleigh IceCaps of Raleigh, North Carolina. The Storm's first head coach was Chris McSorley, older brother of NHLer Marty McSorley, Chris McSorley had previously played for the Toledo Goaldiggers of the International Hockey League from 1984–86. One of McSorley's first actions as head coach would be to procure an affiliation agreement with the NHL's Detroit Red Wings, a team that was heavily supported by Toledo hockey fans as Detroit was within an hour drive of Toledo. In the first year under McSorley, the Storm would play to an impressive record of 46–15–3, winning the West Division title and the Brabham Cup as the team with the best overall record during the ECHL's regular season. Despite the regular season success, the Storm would fall in the first round of the ECHL playoffs, being upset by the Louisville Icehawks four games to one.

The following season, McSorley would once again ice a very competitive team, posting a regular season record of 36–17–11 and a second consecutive West Division title for the Storm and defenceman Derek Booth would become the first member of the team to win an ECHL award, as he was named the Defenseman of the Year for the 1992–93 season. The Storm's finish in the top three of the West Division granted them a bye to the West Division semifinals of the 1993 Riley Cup playoffs. The Storm would be matched with the West Division's fourth place team, the Erie Panthers, who had defeated the Greensboro Monarchs in the second round of the playoffs. The Storm took the first two games of the series at the Toledo Sports Arena 6–3 and 5–2, before Erie won Game Three 9–6 at Louis J. Tullio Arena in the highest scoring game of the 1992–93 Riley Cup playoffs. The Storm would close out the series in Game Four, defeating Erie 6–2 to move to the West Division Finals against the West Division's third place team the Nashville Knights who had swept the West Division's second seed the Dayton Bombers.

Toledo would once again take the first two games of the series defeating Nashville 3–1 in Game One and 7–4 in Game Two. When the series moved back to Nashville, the Knights would take Game Three with a 4–3 overtime victory and tie the series with a 3–2 victory in Game Four. Toledo would take Game Five in Toledo 8–2 and finish the series off with a 9–5 victory in Game Six in Nashville, to earn the first trip to the Riley Cup Finals in club history where they would play the Brabham Cup titleholder Wheeling Thunderbirds. Wheeling would take the first two games of the series 5–3 and 7–3, but the Storm would tie the series when it moved to Toledo, winning Game Three 4–3 and Game Four 7–5. Toledo would take control of the series with a 4–2 victory in Wheeling in Game Five and would clinch their first Riley Cup championship with a 7–6 overtime win in Game Six. Forward Rick Judson was named the Riley Cup Playoffs Most Valuable Player in Toledo's first league championship since the Toledo Goaldiggers won the IHL's Turner Cup during the 1982–83 season.

=== Later years ===
The Storm celebrated their 15th-anniversary during the 2005–06 season, adopting a new logo marking the occasion. The Storm's last season of operation was 2006–2007. The final game was played April 19, 2007, at U.S. Bank Arena against the Cincinnati Cyclones in the North Division Semifinals. The Cyclones won 3–0, sweeping the series in three games.

=== Women's hockey firsts ===
The Toledo Storm once featured a female goaltender, Erin Whitten, who on March 7, 1996 became the first woman ever to appear in a professional hockey game in a position other than goaltender; she played at forward for 18 seconds in a game against the Madison Monsters. She was the first U.S.-born woman to play professional hockey when she appeared for the East Coast Hockey League's Toledo Storm, and on October 30, 1993, became the first woman goaltender to record a professional victory.

=== List of NHL affiliates ===
- Detroit Red Wings (1991–99, 2000–07)
- Nashville Predators (2002–04)
- San Jose Sharks (2005–07)

== Season-by-season record ==
Riley Cup Champions †	League Leader in points *	Conference champions ^	Division Champions ¤

ECHL Season	Conference	Division	Regular season										Postseason					
ECHL Season	Conference	Division	Finish	GP	W	L	OTL	SOL	Pts	GF	GA	PIM	GP	W	L	GF	GA	Result
1991-92	—	West ¤	1st	64	46	15	3	0	95*	367	274	1984	5	1	4	16	23	Lost in First Round, 1-4 (Louisville)
1992-93	—	West ¤	1st	64	36	17	1	10	83	316	238	2211	16	11	5	83	63	Won in Quarterfinals, 3-1 (Erie); Won in Semifinals, 4-2 (Nashville); Won in Riley Cup Finals, 4-2 (Wheeling) †
1993-94	—	North ¤	1st	68	44	20	1	3	92	338	289	2277	14	12	2	75	41	Won in First Round, 2-1 (Dayton); Won in Quarterfinals, 3-0 (Columbus); Won in Semifinals, 3-0 (Wheeling); Won in Riley Cup Finals, 4-1 (Raleigh) †
1994-95	—	North	3rd	68	41	22	5	0	87	287	230	2301	4	1	3	10	12	Lost in First Round, 1-3 (Nashville)
1995-96	—	North ¤	1st	70	48	14	0	8	104	301	240	2353	11	8	3	39	33	Won in First Round, 3-0 (Dayton); Won in Quarterfinals, 3-0 (Knoxville); Lost in Semifinals, 2-3 (Jacksonville)
1996-97	—	North	5th	70	32	28	0	10	74	258	248	1940	5	2	3	12	17	Lost in First Round, 2-3 (Columbus)
1997-98	Northern	Northwest	2nd	70	41	21	0	8	90	251	210	1548	7	4	3	19	19	Won in Conference Quarterfinals, 3-0 (Chesapeake); Lost in Conference Semifinals, 1-3 (Wheeling)
1998-99	Northern	Northwest	3rd	70	39	26	0	5	83	256	246	1915	7	3	4	24	26	Won in Conference Quarterfinals, 3-1 (Peoria); Lost in Conference Semifinals, 0-3 (Richmond)
1999-00	Northern	Northwest	6th	70	22	41	0	7	51	214	306	2405	—	—	—	—	—	Did not qualify
2000-01	Northern	Northwest	3rd	72	37	27	0	8	82	262	259	2273	8	3	5	19	26	Won in Conference Quarterfinals, 3-2 (Roanoke); Lost in Conference Semifinals, 0-3 (Trenton)
2001-02	Northern	Northwest	6th	72	28	34	0	10	66	225	265	1944	—	—	—	—	—	Did not qualify
2002-03	Northern	Northwest ¤	1st	72	47	15	0	10	104*	247	196	2224	7	4	3	22	12	Won in Divisional Semifinals, 3-0 (Lexington); Lost in Divisional Finals, 1-3 (Cincinnati)
2003-04	Eastern	Northern	7th	72	23	38	0	11	57	183	258	1508	—	—	—	—	—	Did not qualify
2004-05	National	North	4th	72	41	26	0	5	87	203	194	1289	4	1	3	3	8	Lost in Division Semifinals, 1-3 (Reading)
2005-06	American	North ¤	1st	72	46	21	0	5	97	244	189	1627	13	7	6	39	36	Won in Division Semifinals, 3-0 (Johnstown); Won in Division Finals, 3-2 (Wheeling); Lost in Conference Finals, 1-4 (Gwinnett)
2006-07	American	North	2nd	72	39	30	0	3	81	211	220	1489	3	0	3	4	14	Lost in Divisional Semifinals, 0-3 (Cincinnati)
16 Seasons		6 Division Titles; 2 Brabham Cups		1,118	610	395	16	97	1,313 (.587)	4,163	3,828	31,288	104	57	47	365	330	13 Playoff Appearances; 2 Riley Cup Championships

== Franchise records ==
=== All-time leaders ===
Goals
1	Rick Judson	197			
2	Andrew Williamson	190			
3	Robert Thorpe	183			
4	Mark Deazeley	93			
5	Alexandre Jacques	85	6	Ron Badgley	84

Assists
1	Rick Judson	244			
2	Greg Puhalski	155			
3	Jason Gladney	153			
4	Robert Thorpe	145			
5	Rick Corriveau	144	6	Ron Badgley	140

Points
1	Rick Judson	441			
2	Andrew Williamson	328			
2	Robert Thorpe	328			
4	Greg Puhalski	225			
5	Rick Corriveau	207	6	Ron Badgley	224

== Head coaches ==
- Chris McSorley, 1991–94
- Greg Puhalski, 1994–98
- Murray Eaves, 1998–99
- Todd Gordon, 1999–00
- Dennis Holland, 2000–02
- Claude Noel, 2002–03
- Steve Harrison, 2003–04
- Nick Vitucci, 2003–07

== Awards and honors ==
Jack Riley Cup
ECHL playoff champion

- 1992–93, 1993–94

Henry Brabham Cup
ECHL regular season champion

- 1991–92, 2002–03

Riley Cup Playoffs Most Valuable Player

- Rick Judson: 1993
- Dave Gagnon: 1994

ECHL Most Valuable Player

- Andrew Williamson: 1999–00

John Brophy Award
ECHL Coach of the year

- Claude Noel: 2002–03
- Nick Vitucci: 2004–05

ECHL Defenseman of the Year

- Derek Booth: 1992–93

ECHL Goaltender of the Year

- Nick Vitucci: 1997–98

ECHL Rookie of the Year

- Sean Venedam: 1997–98

Preceded by Toledo Goaldiggers	Professional Hockey Team in Toledo, Ohio; 1991–2007	Succeeded by Toledo Walleye
Preceded by Knoxville Cherokees	Brabham Cup; Champions; 1991–92	Succeeded by Wheeling Thunderbirds
Preceded by Hampton Roads Admirals	Riley Cup; Champions; 1992–93, 1993–94	Succeeded by Richmond Renegades
Preceded by Louisiana IceGators	Brabham Cup; Champions; 2002–03	Succeeded by San Diego Gulls
