= Dayton Bombers =

- City: Dayton, Ohio
- League: ECHL
- Operated: 1991-2009
- Home arena: Nutter Center
- Colors: Navy blue, red, white
- Media: Dayton Daily News
- Affiliates: Independent

Franchise history
- 1991–2009: Dayton Bombers

Championships
- Regular season titles: None
- Division titles: 2 (2001–02, 2006–07)
- Conference titles: 2 (2001–02, 2006–07)
- Kelly Cups: None

The Dayton Bombers were an ECHL ice hockey team located in Dayton, Ohio. The team most recently was in the North Division of the ECHL's American Conference. The Bombers originally played at Hara Arena from 1991 to 1996. The team moved to the Ervin J. Nutter Center on the campus of Wright State University in Fairborn, Ohio, in 1996.

On March 30, 2009, it was announced that the Bombers would not be playing during the 2009–10 season. Despite the arrival of the International Hockey League's Dayton Gems, the Bombers had not folded nor planned to relocate at that time, and continued to aim towards securing additional investors and season ticket holders to play in Dayton again for 2010–11. However, on June 25 of that year, the Bombers' owner turned the team's membership back to the ECHL, citing lack of a suitable business partner or re-entry plan.

== Season records ==
Note: W = Wins, L = Losses, T = Ties, OTL = Overtime losses, SOL = Shootout losses, GF = Goals for, GA = Goals against, PIM = Penalties infraction minutes

Season	Conference	Division	GP	W	L	T	OTL	SOL	Pts	PCT	GF	GA	PIM	Coach	Attendance	Avg.	Playoff result
1991–92	—	West	64	32	26	0	6	0	70	0.547	305	300	1341	Claude Noel	132,699	4,147	Round 1
1992–93	—	West	64	35	23	0	6	0	76	0.594	282	270	2111	Claude Noel	137,929	4,310	Round 2
1993–94	—	North	68	29	31	0	8	0	66	0.485	316	308	1976	Jim Playfair	139,739	4,109	Round 1
1994–95	—	North	68	42	17	0	9	0	93	0.684	307	224	2235	Jim Playfair	146,239	4,301	Round 2
1995–96	—	North	70	35	28	0	0	7	77	0.55	247	237	2131	Jim Playfair	117,279	3,350	Round 1
1996–97	—	North	70	36	26	8	0	0	80	0.571	253	258	1359	Mark Kumpel	111,417	3,183	Round 1
1997–98	—	Northwest	70	36	26	8	0	0	80	0.571	255	256	2162	Mark Kumpel	146,531	4,186	Round 1
1998–99	Northern	Northwest	70	34	27	9	0	0	77	0.55	239	241	1984	Greg Ireland	158,492	4,528	Round 2
1999–00	Northern	Northwest	70	32	28	10	0	0	74	0.529	230	226	2496	Greg Ireland	147,081	4,202	Round 2
2000–01	Northern	Northwest	72	45	21	6	0	0	96	0.667	247	194	2352	Greg Ireland	145,845	4,051	Round 3
2001–02	Northern	Northwest	72	40	20	12	0	0	92	0.639	222	196	2339	Greg Ireland	153,877	4,274	Kelly Cup Finalist
2002–03	Northern	Northwest	72	24	38	10	0	0	58	0.403	191	247	2005	Greg Ireland	124,662	3,462	—
2003–04	National	North	72	26	41	5	0	0	57	0.396	187	271	1639	Jamie Ling	124,609	3,461	—
2004–05	National	North	72	23	40	9	0	0	55	0.382	175	225	1665	Don MacAdam	112,243	3,117	—
2005–06	American	North	72	20	46	6	0	0	46	0.319	193	275	1482	Don MacAdam	124,406	3,455	—
2006–07	American	North	72	37	26	0	2	7	83	0.576	213	191	1345	Don MacAdam	131,196	3,644	Kelly Cup Finalist
2007–08	American	North	72	29	31	0	6	6	70	0.479	201	229	1356	Bill McDonald	131,881	3,663	1st Rd
2008–09	American	North	72	32	33	0	4	3	71	0.493	229	246	1255	Bill McDonald	132,454	3,679	—
Team totals			1,190	567	500	83	32	21		0.534					2,315,374	3,865	

== Playoffs ==
- 1991–92: Lost to Cincinnati 3-0 in first round.
- 1992–93: Lost to Nashville 3-0 in quarterfinals.
- 1993–94: Lost to Toledo 2-1 in first round.
- 1994–95: Defeated Huntington 3-1 in first round; lost to Greensboro 3-2 in quarterfinals.
- 1995–96: Lost to Toledo 3-0 in first round.
- 1996–97: Lost to Richmond 3-1 in first round.
- 1997–98: Lost to Wheeling 3-2 in first round.
- 1998–99: Lost to Roanoke 3-1 in first round.
- 1999–00: Lost to Peoria 3-0 in first round.
- 2000–01: Defeated Charlotte 3-2 in first round; lost to Peoria 3-0 in quarterfinals.
- 2001–02: Defeated Cincinnati 3-0 in first round; defeated Johnstown 3-0 in quarterfinals; defeated Atlantic City 3-1 in semifinals; lost to Greenville 4-0 in finals.
- 2002–03: Did not qualify.
- 2003–04: Did not qualify.
- 2004–05: Did not qualify.
- 2005–06: Did not qualify.
- 2006–07: Defeated Trenton 3-0 in first round; defeated Cincinnati 4-3 in quarterfinals; defeated Florida 4-3 in semifinals; lost to Idaho 4-1 in finals.
- 2007–08: Lost to Johnstown 2-0 in first round.
- 2008–09: Did not qualify.

== All-time record vs. other clubs ==
Team	Won	Loss	Tie
Alaska	0	1	0
Augusta	1	2	1
Bakersfield	0	1	0
Charlotte	6	6	5
Cincinnati	29	30	10
Columbia	2	3	0
Elmira	3	6	1
Florida	1	0	0
Fresno	0	2	0
Gwinnett	1	1	1
Idaho	0	1	0
Johnstown	78	47	19
Las Vegas	0	0	0
Mississippi	6	2	2
Pensacola	0	0	1
Phoenix	0	0	0
Reading	21	27	5
South Carolina	4	4	0
Stockton	1	3	0
Texas	0	0	0
Trenton	23	38	5
Utah	0	0	0
Victoria	1	0	0
Wheeling	61	64	19

== Dayton Bombers club records ==
Players

- Most points, season - 119 Darren Colbourne (1991–92)
- Most points, game - 7 Tom Nemeth vs Toledo, Oct. 23, 1993 & Jamie Ling vs Roanoke, Jan. 15, 1999
- Most goals, season - 69 Darren Colbourne (1991–92)
- Most goals, game - 5 Jamie Ling vs Roanoke, Jan. 15, 1999 & Chanse Fitzpatrick vs Trenton, Nov. 3, 2007
- Most assists, season - 82 Tom Nemeth, 1993–94
- Most assists, game - 6 Tom Nemeth vs Toledo, Oct. 23, 1993
- Most PIM, season - 429 Darren Langdon, 1992–93
- Most PIM, game - 39 Derek Ernest vs Roanoke, Nov. 23, 2000

Goaltenders

- Most appearances: 51, Michael Ayers (2004–05)
- Most minutes: 2,937 min, Michael Ayers (2004–05)
- Most wins: 23, Adam Berkhoel (2006–07)
- Most losses: 28, Michael Ayers (2004–05)
- Most overtime Losses: 7, Alex Westlund (1999–00)
- Most shots- 1,627, Michael Ayers (2004–05)
- Most saves- 1,485, Michael Ayers (2005–06)
- Most shutouts- 5, Adam Berkhoel (2006–07)
- Lowest GAA- 2.22, Alex Westlund (2000–01)
- Best save percentage: .930, Alex Westlund (2000–01)

Team

- Most points- 96 (2000–01)
- Most wins- 45 (2000–01)
- Most losses- 46 (2005–06)
- Most goals scored- 316 (1993–94)
- Fewest points- 46 (2005–06)
- Fewest losses- 17 (1994–95)
- Fewest GAA- 191 (2006–07)
- Most PIM- 2,496 (1999–00)

Longest winning streak

- Overall- 8 Oct. 9 – Nov. 5, 1994
- Home- 13 Oct. 28 – Dec. 27, 2001
- Road- 5 Oct. 28 – Nov. 14, 2000

Longest winless streak

- Overall- 16 Feb. 24 – Apr. 1, 2006
- Home- 9 Jan. 4 – Feb. 8, 2005
- Road- 13 Jan. 18 – Mar. 26, 2003

Regular Season Game Attendance Record

- 10,057 vs Peoria, Jan. 23, 2004

Postseason Game Attendance Record

- 4,447 vs Idaho, May 27, 2007 Game 3 Kelly Cup Finals

Regular Season Attendance Record

- 158,492 (1998–99)

== All-time playoff record vs. other clubs ==
Team	Series	Won	Loss	GP	Won	Loss	GF	GA	Last Mtg	Rnd	Result
Atlantic City (Note: Atlantic City totals include Cincinnati (1990–92))	2	1	1	7	3	4	20	31	2002	CF	W 3-1
Charlotte	1	1	0	5	3	2	16	15	2001	CQF	W 3-2
Cincinnati	1	1	0	7	4	3	25	19	2007	DF	W 4-3
Florida	1	1	0	7	4	3	23	22	2007	CF	W 4-3
Greenville	1	0	1	4	0	4	7	18	2002	Finals	L 0-4
Johnstown	2	1	1	5	3	2	13	13	2008	1st	L 0-2
Idaho	1	0	1	5	1	4	8	16	2007	Finals	L 1-4
Pensacola (Note: Pensacola totals include Nashville (1989–96))	1	0	1	3	0	3	9	13	1993	1st	L 0-3
Peoria	2	0	2	6	0	6	13	23	2001	CSF	L 0-3
Texas (Note: Texas totals include Huntington (1993–2000))	1	1	0	4	3	1	15	12	1995	1st	W 3-1
Toledo	2	0	2	6	1	5	17	28	1996	1st	L 0-3
Trenton	1	1	0	3	3	0	8	3	2007	DSF	W 3-0
Wheeling	1	0	1	5	2	3	11	15	1998	CQF	L 2-3

== NHL alumni ==
The following is a list of players who have gone on to play in the NHL.

- Kaspars Astashenko
- Jean-Sebastien Aubin
- Eric Boguniecki
- Kevin Colley
- Riley Cote
- John Emmons
- Trevor Frischmon
- Mark Flood
- Sean Gagnon
- Steven Goertzen
- Erich Goldmann
- Greg Kuznik
- Darren Langdon
- Dan LaCosta
- Kent McDonell
- Mike Minard
- Brandon Smith
- Ole-Kristian Tollefsen
- Pascal Trepanier
- Stephen Valiquette
- Daryl Reaugh
- David Van Drunen
- Mark Lawrence
- Tyler Sloan
- Philippe Dupuis
