= 1988–89 ECHL season =

Ice hockey league season

The 1988–89 ECHL season was the inaugural season of the East Coast Hockey League (ECHL). The league's first season consisted of five teams in Erie, Pennsylvania, Johnstown, Pennsylvania, Knoxville, Tennessee, Vinton, Virginia and Winston-Salem, North Carolina. The five teams played 60 games each in the schedule. The Erie Panthers finished first overall in the regular season. The Carolina Thunderbirds won the first Riley Cup championship.

== Regular season ==
Note: GP = Games played; W = Wins; L= Losses; OTL = Overtime losses; GF = Goals for; GA = Goals against; Pts = Points; Green shade = Clinched playoff spot

East Coast Hockey League	GP	W	L	OTL	Pts	GF	GA
Erie Panthers	60	37	20	3	77	327	256
Johnstown Chiefs	60	32	22	6	70	295	251
Knoxville Cherokees	60	32	27	1	65	266	286
Carolina Thunderbirds	60	27	32	1	55	266	329
Virginia Lancers	60	22	30	8	52	266	298

== Riley Cup playoffs ==
Riley Cup Semifinals
1	Erie	0
4	Carolina	4
3	Knoxville	0
2	Johnstown	4

Riley Cup Finals
4	Carolina	4
2	Johnstown	3

=== 1989 Riley Cup Finals ===
==== Johnstown Chiefs vs. Carolina Thunderbirds ====
April 1	Johnstown Chiefs	8 – 1	Carolina Thunderbirds	Cambria County War Memorial Arena

April 2	Johnstown Chiefs	6 – 1	Carolina Thunderbirds	Cambria County War Memorial Arena

April 5	Carolina Thunderbirds	7 – 4	Johnstown Chiefs	Winston-Salem Memorial Coliseum

April 8	Johnstown Chiefs	3 – 5	Carolina Thunderbirds	Cambria County War Memorial Arena

April 9	Carolina Thunderbirds	7 – 1	Johnstown Chiefs	Winston-Salem Memorial Coliseum

April 10	Carolina Thunderbirds	4 – 7	Johnstown Chiefs	Winston-Salem Memorial Coliseum

April 12	Johnstown Chiefs	4 – 7	Carolina Thunderbirds	Cambria County War Memorial Arena

Carolina wins series 4 – 3

== ECHL awards ==
Jack Riley Cup:	Carolina Thunderbirds
Henry Brabham Cup:	Erie Panthers
John Brophy Award:	Ron Hansis (Erie)
ECHL Most Valuable Player:	Daryl Harpe (Erie)
Riley Cup Playoffs Most Valuable Player:	Nick Vitucci (Carolina)
ECHL Rookie of the Year:	Tom Sasso (Johnstown)
Defenseman of the Year:	Kelly Szauter (Erie)
Leading Scorer:	Daryl Harpe (Erie)

== See also ==
- ECHL All-Star Game
- Kelly Cup
- List of ECHL seasons
- 1988 in sports
- 1989 in sports
