= Pensacola Ice Pilots =

Defunct minor professional ice hockey team

- City: Pensacola, Florida
- League: ECHL
- Founded: 1989
- Home arena: Pensacola Civic Center
- Colors: Navy blue, gold
- Affiliates: New York Islanders

Franchise history
- 1989–1996: Nashville Knights
- 1996–2008: Pensacola Ice Pilots

Championships
- Regular season titles: 1 (2004–05)
- Division titles: 1 (2004–05)
- Conference titles: 1 (1997–98)
- Kelly Cups: None

The Pensacola Ice Pilots were a professional ice hockey team located in Pensacola, Florida. The team was previously affiliated with the Tampa Bay Lightning, Toronto Maple Leafs, New York Islanders (2006–07), and the Chicago Blackhawks. They have also had a working agreement with the Houston Aeros of the AHL for the 04–05 season. On June 23, 2008, the ECHL announced that it had terminated the Ice Pilots' membership, effective immediately.

The team's colors (navy blue and gold) and nickname were a tribute to the long history of Naval aviation in Pensacola (Naval Air Station Pensacola is home to the legendary Blue Angels and the National Museum of Naval Aviation).

The home of the Pensacola Ice Pilots was the Pensacola Civic Center, which was referred to as "The Hangar", and has a capacity of 8,150.

The Ice Pilots were formerly the Nashville Knights but moved to Pensacola following the 1995–96 season.

== Notable achievements and players ==
=== Team ===
- The 1997–98 Ice Pilots finished the season with a record of 36–24–10 and won the ECHL Southern Conference championship. The Ice Pilots advanced to their only Kelly Cup appearance against the Hampton Roads Admirals. The Ice Pilots took a 2–1 lead in the best-of-seven Kelly Cup Final. But a scheduling conflict at the Norfolk Scope, the Admirals' home arena, forced a delay of nine days between Games 3 and 4. The Ice Pilots elected to stay in Virginia, rather than return to Pensacola for the week. The Admirals won Games 4 and 5 at home, then clinched the series in Game 6, in Pensacola.
- The 2004–2005 Pensacola Ice Pilots won the Brabham Cup for the most points overall in the league during the regular season.

=== Players ===
- Glen Metropolit played 54 games for Pensacola in 1996-97 and scored 82 points. He would later join the Washington Capitals (1999–2001; 2001–03), Tampa Bay Lightning (2001), Atlanta Thrashers (2006–07), St. Louis Blues (2007), Boston Bruins (2007–08), Philadelphia Flyers (2008–09), and Montreal Canadiens (2009–10). Metropolit's NHL career spanned eight seasons and 407 games.
- Raitis Ivanans played 59 games for Pensacola in 1999–2000, scoring ten points and accumulating 146 penalty minutes. He would later join the Montreal Canadiens, Los Angeles Kings, and Calgary Flames as an enforcer, playing 282 games in the NHL from 2005 to 2012.
- Kevin Colley played 23 games with Pensacola during the 2000–01 season. He also played 16 games for the New York Islanders during the 2005–06 NHL season until a career ending neck injury forced Colley into retirement at the age of 27. In his lone season with the Islanders, Colley won the Bob Nystrom Award, an award given to the Islander "who best exemplifies leadership, hustle and dedication" as voted on by the fans. Colley was named assistant coach of the Utah Grizzlies for the 2007–08 season and later held the position of head coach with the team from 2008 to 2013.
- Ryan Craig played five games with the Ice Pilots during the 2003–04 season before going on to play for the Tampa Bay Lightning, Pittsburgh Penguins, and Columbus Blue Jackets. Craig retired as a player after the 2016–17 AHL season and later joined the Vegas Golden Knights as an assistant coach during their inaugural 2017–18 NHL season.
- Evgeny Artyukhin played six games for the Ice Pilots in 03–04 before playing 72 games for the Tampa Bay Lightning in 05–06, where he scored 17 points in 72 games. Artyukhin would later return the Lightning for the 2008-09 NHL season. He also split time between the Anaheim Ducks and Atlanta Thrashers for the 2009–10 NHL season.
- John Tripp played in 85 games for the Ice Pilots between 2000 and 2002. He appeared in 43 NHL games from 2002 to 2004; 9 games with the New York Rangers during the 2002–03 NHL season, and 34 games with the Los Angeles Kings during the 2003–04 NHL season. Tripp played the next ten seasons in the DEL from 2005 to 2015 and represented Team Germany in the 2010 Olympic Games.
- Evgeny Konstantinov had two separate stints with the Ice Pilots. He played 24 games with the team during the 2001–02 ECHL season and later rejoined the team in 2003–04 and played another 12 games. Konstantinov also had two very brief appearances in the NHL. On December 8, 2000, Konstantinov was played into a game vs the Colorado Avalanche for 24 seconds but did not record any saves. Konstantinov made his second appearance with the Lightning on November 21, 2002, a 6–1 loss to the New York Islanders. Konstantinov allowed a goal on six shots in 20 minutes of play.
- Brian Eklund played 81 games with the Ice Pilots from 2002 to 2004 and set league records during the 2003–04 ECHL season for minutes played (3,724), saves (2,194), saves in a single game (83, in a 2-1 double OT loss) and tied the league record for wins (38). Eklund played his only NHL game on November 5, 2005; a 3–2 loss versus the Montreal Canadiens. Eklund was also the #3 goalie with the 2003-04 Tampa Bay Lightning and received a Stanley Cup ring.
- Mike Brodeur played 26 games with the Ice Pilots during their final season (2007–08). He later appeared in seven NHL games with the Ottawa Senators from 2010 to 2012, going 3-1-0 with a shutout. Brodeur won his NHL debut on December 19, 2009, when the Ottawa Senators beat the Minnesota Wild 4–1.
- Patrick Bordeleau played 38 games with Pensacola during their final season. He later appeared in 129 games with the Colorado Avalanche from 2012 to 2015.

=== Staff ===
- John Marks broke the ECHL record for most career coaching wins during the 2007–08 season and completed his ECHL coaching career with 491 ECHL victories.

== Playoffs ==
=== Nashville Knights ===
- 1989–90: Lost to Winston-Salem 4–1 in first round.
- 1990–91: Did not qualify.
- 1991–92: Did not qualify.
- 1992–93: Defeated Dayton 3–0 in quarterfinals; lost to Toledo 4–2 in semifinals.
- 1993–94: Lost to Wheeling 2–0 in first round.
- 1994–95: Defeated Toledo 3–1 in first round; defeated South Carolina 3–1 in quarterfinals; lost to Greensboro 3–2 in semifinals.
- 1995–96: Lost to Knoxville 3–2 in first round.

=== Pensacola Ice Pilots ===
- 1996–97: Defeated Tallahassee 3–0 in first round; defeated Richmond 3–1 in quarterfinals; lost to South Carolina 3–2 in semifinals.
- 1997–98: Defeated New Orleans 3–1 in first round; defeated Charlotte 3–0 in quarterfinals; defeated Louisiana 4–2 in semifinals; lost to Hampton Roads 4–2 in finals.
- 1998–99: Did not qualify.
- 1999–00: Lost to Mississippi 2–1 in first round.
- 2000–01: Did not qualify.
- 2001–02: Lost to Mississippi 3–0 in first round.
- 2002–03: Lost to Jackson 1–0 in qualifying round.
- 2003–04: Lost to Louisiana 3–2 in first round.
- 2004–05: Lost to Greenville 3–1 in first round.
- 2005–06: Did not qualify.
- 2006–07: Did not qualify.
- 2007–08: Did not qualify.

== Future ==
=== Transfer to a new league ===
After the 2007–08 season, when the Ice Pilots had finished dead last for three consecutive years, team owner Mario Forgione announced he had no intention of fielding a team in Pensacola for the ECHL during the 2008–09 season. Forgione announced plans to keep a team in Pensacola, but one in an unnamed, lower-level league. The ECHL then stated that it would revoke the franchise if need be, and the ECHL made it official on Monday, June 23, 2008. On April 4, 2009, the SPHL announced discussions between potential investors, key government officials, local fans and business leaders in Pensacola, Florida relative to the award of a franchise for the 2009–10 SPHL season. However, the press release stopped short of explicitly stating that this expansion team would not be the Ice Pilots franchise owned by Mario Forgione. Instead the league formed a new team, the Pensacola Ice Flyers, owned by former NHL player Tim Kerr.

=== Hockey returns to Nashville in 1998 ===
Once the Nashville Knights had moved to their new location in 1996, Nashville was left with no ice hockey team to follow. However, this was changed in 1998 when the Knights' successors, the National Hockey League's Nashville Predators were founded in the 1998 NHL expansion. The Predators have stayed in Nashville since their inaugural season in 1998, spending 26 complete seasons in the city and league with their 27th season currently in progress. Despite being their successors, the Predators do not actually have any kind of affiliation or tribute to the Knights.

The Predators have yet to win a Stanley Cup title. They did, however, make an appearance in the 2017 Stanley Cup Finals, but ultimately lost to their opponent, the Pittsburgh Penguins in the span of six games. Despite having almost always first round exits since then, the Predators have had great consistency with making the playoffs, clinching eight times in a row between 2014-2022. Out of their 26 completed seasons, 16 of them ended with playoff appearances.

== Former Ice Pilots who have gone on to represent their country internationally ==
- Evgeny Artyukhin - Artyukhin represented Russia on the U17, U18, and U20 teams but has only played sparingly for the Russian National Team due to his size and style of play not fitting the typical European style of hockey.
- Gregor Baumgartner - Baumgartner returned to his native Austria and went on to be a star in the Erste Bank Eishockey Liga as well as make appearances for the Austrian National Team in World Championships and various tournaments.
- Greg Chambers ( (Canada) /) - Canadian-born Chambers first played in the United Kingdom during the 2005–2006 season after spending 2004–2005 in Italy. He has played there ever since and acquired British citizenship and is now a member of the British National Team.
- John Hecimovic ( (Canada) /) - Hecimovic is Canadian by birth but his family still very much identified with their Croatian heritage. Hecimovic spent the 09-10 and 10–11 seasons with KHL Medveščak and was eligible to compete for the Croatian National Team at the 2012 IIHF World Championship Division II Group A tournament but a shoulder injury forced him to sit out. Hecimovic finally got his chance to skate for Croatia at the Olympic Preliminary Qualification tournament for the 2014 Sochi Games held in September 2012 in Zagreb.
- Roger Holeczy ( (United States) /) - American-born to Hungarian parents, Holczy played most of his career in America before heading to his parents' native Hungary where he went on to play for the Hungarian National Team.
- Andreas Holmqvist - Holmqvist has represented Sweden both before and after his time in Pensacola. He played on the Swedish U20 team in the World Junior Championship as well as playing for the Swedish National Team in many tournaments and exhibition games.
- Raitis Ivanans - Ivanans represented Latvia in the Junior ranks before coming to the Ice Pilots. In 2008 (after his second full NHL season), he played for the Latvian National Team in the 2008 IIHF Elite Division World Championship despite being known widely as an enforcer.
- Aleksander Materukhin ( (Ukraine) /) - Materukhin played for the Ice Pilots in 2004-2005 and has played in the 2005 and 2006 Elite Division World Championships as well as the 2008 Division 1 World Championship for the Ukrainian National Team. In 2018, the IIHF approved a one-time nationality change for Materukhin after he requested to represent Belarus. He will make his IIHF debut for the Belarusian National Team at the 2018 Men's World Ice Hockey Championships.
- Glen Metropolit ( (Canada) ) - Metropolit played for the Ice Pilots in 1996-1997 before making it to the NHL 3 seasons later. Despite playing mostly a journeyman's career, Metropolit represented his home nation in the 2006 IIHF World Championship playing for the Canadian National Team.
- Corey Neilson (/) - Neilson is Canadian born and even represented Canada for two games in a non-IIHF event during the 1999–2000 season. He moved to the United Kingdom prior to the 2006–2007 season and has lived there ever since. He waited some time to get his British Citizenship but has done so and is now a member of the British National Team and will compete with them for the first time in the 2011 IIHF World Championship Division I Group B in Kyiv, Ukraine.
- John Tripp ( (Canada) / (Germany) ) - Canadian-born Tripp started his professional career in North America before signing with Adler Mannheim of the Deutsche Eishockey Liga. He acquired German citizenship and represented the German National Team in the 2010 Winter Olympics.

== Coaches ==
- Allen Pedersen (1996–2000)
- Wayne Cashman (2000–2001)
- Todd Gordon (2001–2004)
- Dave Farrish (2004–2005)
- Rick Adduono (2005–2006)
- George Dupont (2006; over two seasons)
- Joe Clark (2006–2007)
- Dwayne Hay and Greg Schuh (2006) ^
- John Marks (2007–2008)

^ - They coached four games while Clark was away tending to his ailing mother.

== See also ==
- Pensacola Ice Flyers
