= Knoxville Cherokees =

Defunct minor professional ice hockey team

- City: Knoxville, Tennessee
- League: ECHL
- Founded: 1988
- Operated: 1988–1997
- Home arena: James White Civic Coliseum
- Colors: Turquoise, black, silver

Franchise history
- 1988–1997: Knoxville Cherokees
- 1997– 2005: Pee Dee Pride

Championships
- Regular season titles: 1990–91, 1993–94
- Division titles: 1990–91, 1993–94

The Knoxville Cherokees were an East Coast Hockey League (ECHL) team based in Knoxville, Tennessee.

== History ==
The franchise was formed in 1988 along with the ECHL. The team moved to Florence, South Carolina in 1997 and was renamed the Pee Dee Pride.

Market previously served by: Knoxville Knights of the EHL (1961-68)
Franchise replaced by: Knoxville Speed of the UHL (1999-02)

== Season-by-Season record ==
Note: GP = Games played, W = Wins, L = Losses, T = Ties, OTL = Overtime losses/Shootout losses, Pts = Points, GF = Goals for, GA = Goals against, PIM = Penalties in minutes

Season	GP	W	L	T	OTL	Pts	GF	GA	PIM	Finish	Playoffs
1988–89	60	32	27	0	1	65	266	286	0	3rd, League	Lost in Round 1
1989–90	60	21	33	0	6	48	230	300	1777	8th, League	
1990–91	64	46	13	0	5	97	377	3230	1537	1st, West	Lost in Round 1
1991–92	64	20	36	0	8	48	265	355	1427	7th, East	
1992–93	64	19	39	0	6	44	212	323	1867	8th, West	
1993–94	68	44	18	0	6	97	325	246	1929	1st, West	Lost in Round 1
1994–95	68	30	30	0	8	68	241	267	1940	4th, West	Lost in Round 1
1995–96	70	37	29	0	4	78	323	303	2383	4th South	
1996–97	70	24	43	3	0	51	260	343	2213	7th, East	

== Playoffs ==
- 1988–89: Lost to Johnstown 4–0 in semifinals.
- 1989–90: Did not qualify.
- 1990–91: Lost to Louisville 3–1 in quarterfinals.
- 1991–92: Did not qualify.
- 1992–93: Did not qualify.
- 1993–94: Lost to Louisville 3–1 in first round.
- 1994–95: Lost to Roanoke 3–1 in first round.
- 1995–96: Defeated Nashville 3–2 in first round; lost to Toledo 3–0 in quarterfinals.

== Team records ==
Goals: 63 Stan Drulia (1990-91)
Assists: 93 Daniel Gauthier (1990-91)
Points: 140 Stan Drulia (1990-91)
Penalty Minutes: 443 Grant Chorney (1992-93)
GAA: 2.00 Steve Averill (1989-90)
SV%: .941 Rick Robus (1996-97)
Career Goals: 123 Mike Murray
Career Assists: 164 Mike Murray
Career Points: 287 Mike Murray
Career Penalty Minutes: 768 Greg Batters
Career Goaltending Wins: 66 Cory Cadden
Career Shutouts: 3 Dean Anderson
Career Games: 262 Mike Murray

== Notable NHL alumni ==
List of Knoxville Cherokees alumni who played more than 25 games in Knoxville and 25 or more games in the National Hockey League.

- Garrett Burnett
- Stan Drulia
- Sean Pronger
- David Williams
