= List of ECHL arenas =

The following is a list of ECHL arenas including past and present arenas:

== Eastern Conference ==
Eastern Conference
North Division
Team	Arena	Years used	Capacity	Opened	City
Adirondack Thunder Stockton Thunder (2005–2015) Atlantic City Boardwalk Bullies (2001–2005) Birmingham Bulls (1992–2001) Cincinnati Cyclones (1990–1992)	Harding Mazzotti Arena; Glens Falls Civic Center (1979–2017); Cool Insuring Arena (2017–2025)	2015–present	4,794	1979	Glens Falls, New York
Adirondack Thunder Stockton Thunder (2005–2015) Atlantic City Boardwalk Bullies (2001–2005) Birmingham Bulls (1992–2001) Cincinnati Cyclones (1990–1992)	Stockton Arena	2005–2015	9,737	2005	Stockton, California
Adirondack Thunder Stockton Thunder (2005–2015) Atlantic City Boardwalk Bullies (2001–2005) Birmingham Bulls (1992–2001) Cincinnati Cyclones (1990–1992)	Boardwalk Hall	2001–2005	10,500	1926	Atlantic City, New Jersey
Adirondack Thunder Stockton Thunder (2005–2015) Atlantic City Boardwalk Bullies (2001–2005) Birmingham Bulls (1992–2001) Cincinnati Cyclones (1990–1992)	Birmingham–Jefferson Convention Complex	1992–2001	17,654	1976	Birmingham, Alabama
Adirondack Thunder Stockton Thunder (2005–2015) Atlantic City Boardwalk Bullies (2001–2005) Birmingham Bulls (1992–2001) Cincinnati Cyclones (1990–1992)	Cincinnati Gardens	1990–1992	10,208	1949	Cincinnati, Ohio
Greensboro Gargoyles	First Horizon Coliseum	2025–Present	22,000	1959	Greensboro, North Carolina
Maine Mariners Alaska Aces (2003–2017)	Cross Insurance Arena	2018–present	6,733	1977	Portland, Maine
Maine Mariners Alaska Aces (2003–2017)	Sullivan Arena	1995–2017	6,290	1983	Anchorage, Alaska
Reading Royals Columbus Chill (1991–1999)	Santander Arena; Sovereign Center (2001–2013)	2001–present	7,083	2001	Reading, Pennsylvania
Reading Royals Columbus Chill (1991–1999)	Ohio Expo Center Coliseum	1991–1999	7,000	1918	Columbus, Ohio
Trois-Rivières Lions	Colisée Vidéotron	2021–present	4,390	2021	Trois-Rivières, Quebec
Wheeling Nailers Wheeling Thunderbirds (1992–1996) Carolina/Winston-Salem Thunderbirds (1988–1992)	WesBanco Arena; Wheeling Civic Center (1977–2003)	1992–present	5,406	1977	Wheeling, West Virginia
Wheeling Nailers Wheeling Thunderbirds (1992–1996) Carolina/Winston-Salem Thunderbirds (1988–1992)	Winston–Salem Memorial Coliseum	1988–1992	8,500	1955	Winston-Salem, North Carolina
Worcester Railers	DCU Center	2017–present	12,239	1982	Worcester, Massachusetts
South Division
Team	Arena	Years used	Capacity	Opened	City
Atlanta Gladiators Gwinnett Gladiators (2003–2015) Mobile Mysticks (1995–2002)	Gas South Arena; Infinite Energy Arena (2015–2021); Arena at Gwinnett Center (2004–2015); Gwinnett Civic Center Arena (2003–2004)	2003–present	11,355	2003	Duluth, Georgia
Atlanta Gladiators Gwinnett Gladiators (2003–2015) Mobile Mysticks (1995–2002)	Mobile Civic Center	1995–2002	10,112	1964	Mobile, Alabama
Florida Everblades	Hertz Arena; Germain Arena (2004–2018); TECO Arena (1998–2004); Everblades Arena (1998)	1998–present	7,181	1998	Estero, Florida
Greenville Swamp Rabbits Greenville Road Warriors (2010–2015) Johnstown Chiefs (1988–2010)	Bon Secours Wellness Arena; BI-LO Center (1998–2013)	2010–present	13,707	1998	Greenville, South Carolina
Greenville Swamp Rabbits Greenville Road Warriors (2010–2015) Johnstown Chiefs (1988–2010)	Cambria County War Memorial Arena	1988–2010	3,745	1950	Johnstown, Pennsylvania
Jacksonville Icemen Evansville IceMen (2012–2016)	VyStar Veterans Memorial Arena; Jacksonville Veterans Memorial Arena (2003–2019)	2017–present	13,141	2003	Jacksonville, Florida
Jacksonville Icemen Evansville IceMen (2012–2016)	Ford Center	2011–2016	9,437	2011	Evansville, Indiana
Norfolk Admirals Bakersfield Condors (2003–2015)	Norfolk Scope	2015–present	8,701	1971	Norfolk, Virginia
Norfolk Admirals Bakersfield Condors (2003–2015)	Rabobank Arena; Bakersfield Centennial Garden (1998–2005)	1998–2015	8,700	1998	Bakersfield, California
Orlando Solar Bears	Kia Center	2012–present	17,353	2010	Orlando, Florida
Savannah Ghost Pirates	Enmarket Arena	2022–present	7,300	2022	Savannah, Georgia
South Carolina Stingrays	North Charleston Coliseum	1993–present	10,537	1993	North Charleston, South Carolina

== Western Conference ==
Western Conference
Central Division
Team	Arena	Years used	Capacity	Opened	City
Bloomington Bison	Grossinger Motors Arena	2024-present	7,000	2006	Bloomington, Illinois
Cincinnati Cyclones Miami Matadors (1998–1999) Louisville RiverFrogs (1995–1998)	Heritage Bank Center; U.S. Bank Arena (2001–2019)	2001–present	14,453	1975	Cincinnati, Ohio
Cincinnati Cyclones Miami Matadors (1998–1999) Louisville RiverFrogs (1995–1998)	Miami Arena	1998–1999	14,823	1988	Miami, Florida
Cincinnati Cyclones Miami Matadors (1998–1999) Louisville RiverFrogs (1995–1998)	Broadbent Arena	1995–1998	6,600	1977	Louisville, Kentucky
Fort Wayne Komets	Allen County War Memorial Coliseum	1990–present	10,480	1952	Fort Wayne, Indiana
Indy Fuel	Fishers Event Center	2024-present	7,500	2024	Fishers, Indiana
Indy Fuel	Corteva Coliseum; Indiana Farmers Coliseum (2015–2024); Fairgrounds Coliseum (April 2014-December 2014)	2014–2024	6,300	1939	Indianapolis, Indiana
Iowa Heartlanders	Xtream Arena	2021–present	5,100	2021	Coralville, Iowa
Kalamazoo Wings	Wings Event Center; Wings Stadium (1974–2015)	2000–present	5,113	1974	Kalamazoo, Michigan
Toledo Walleye Toledo Storm (1991–2007)	Huntington Center; Lucas County Arena (2009–2010)	2009–present	7,389	2009	Toledo, Ohio
Toledo Walleye Toledo Storm (1991–2007)	Toledo Sports Arena	1991–2007	5,230	1947	Toledo, Ohio
Mountain Division
Team	Arena	Years used	Capacity	Opened	City
Allen Americans	Allen Event Center	2009–present	6,275	2009	Allen, Texas
Idaho Steelheads	Idaho Central Arena; CenturyLink Arena Boise (2011–2020); Qwest Arena (2005–2011); Bank of America Centre (1997–2005)	1997–present	5,002	1997	Boise, Idaho
Kansas City Mavericks Missouri Mavericks (2014–2017)	Cable Dahmer Arena; Silverstein Eye Centers Arena (2015–20); Independence Events Center (2009–15)	2009–present	5,800	2009	Independence, Missouri
Rapid City Rush	Rushmore Plaza Civic Center	2008–present	5,132	1977	Rapid City, South Dakota
Tahoe Knight Monsters	Tahoe Blue Event Center	2024-present	4,200	2023	Stateline, Nevada
Tulsa Oilers	BOK Center	2008–present	17,096	2008	Tulsa, Oklahoma
Utah Grizzlies Lexington Men O' War (2002–2003) Macon Whoopee (2001–2002) Tallahassee Tiger Sharks (1994–2001) Huntsville Blast (1993–1994) Roanoke Valley Rebels/Rampage (1990–1993) Virginia Lancers (1988–1990)	Maverik Center; E Center (1997–2010)	2005–present	10,100	1997	West Valley City, Utah
Utah Grizzlies Lexington Men O' War (2002–2003) Macon Whoopee (2001–2002) Tallahassee Tiger Sharks (1994–2001) Huntsville Blast (1993–1994) Roanoke Valley Rebels/Rampage (1990–1993) Virginia Lancers (1988–1990)	Rupp Arena	2002–2003	23,500	1976	Lexington, Kentucky
Utah Grizzlies Lexington Men O' War (2002–2003) Macon Whoopee (2001–2002) Tallahassee Tiger Sharks (1994–2001) Huntsville Blast (1993–1994) Roanoke Valley Rebels/Rampage (1990–1993) Virginia Lancers (1988–1990)	Macon Coliseum	2001–2002	7,182	1968	Macon, Georgia
Utah Grizzlies Lexington Men O' War (2002–2003) Macon Whoopee (2001–2002) Tallahassee Tiger Sharks (1994–2001) Huntsville Blast (1993–1994) Roanoke Valley Rebels/Rampage (1990–1993) Virginia Lancers (1988–1990)	Tallahassee–Leon County Civic Center	1994–2001	12,100	1981	Tallahassee, Florida
Utah Grizzlies Lexington Men O' War (2002–2003) Macon Whoopee (2001–2002) Tallahassee Tiger Sharks (1994–2001) Huntsville Blast (1993–1994) Roanoke Valley Rebels/Rampage (1990–1993) Virginia Lancers (1988–1990)	Von Braun Center	1993–1994	6,602	1975	Huntsville, Alabama
Utah Grizzlies Lexington Men O' War (2002–2003) Macon Whoopee (2001–2002) Tallahassee Tiger Sharks (1994–2001) Huntsville Blast (1993–1994) Roanoke Valley Rebels/Rampage (1990–1993) Virginia Lancers (1988–1990)	LancerLot	1988–1993	–	–	Vinton, Virginia
Wichita Thunder	Intrust Bank Arena	2010–present	13,450	2010	Wichita, Kansas

== Future teams ==
Future teams arenas
Team	Arena	Years used	Capacity	Opened	City
New Mexico Goatheads	Rio Rancho Events Center	Beginning in 2026	6,000	2006	Rio Rancho, New Mexico
Trenton Ironhawks (relocation of the Utah Grizzlies)	Cure Insurance Arena	1999-2015, 2018-2023	7,605 (for hockey)	1999	Trenton, New Jersey
Augusta Lynx	New Augusta Arena	Beginning in 2027	8,720	2027	Augusta, Georgia

== Defunct teams ==
Defunct teams arenas
Team (years in ECHL)	Arena	Years used	Capacity	Opened	City
Arkansas RiverBlades (1999–2003)	Alltel Arena	1999–2003	17,000	1999	N. Little Rock, Arkansas
Augusta Lynx (1998–2008) Raleigh IceCaps (1991–1998)	James Brown Arena; Augusta-Richmond County Civic Center (1974–2006)	1998–2008	9,167	1974	Augusta, Georgia
Augusta Lynx (1998–2008) Raleigh IceCaps (1991–1998)	Dorton Arena	1991–1998	7,610	1952	Raleigh, North Carolina
Brampton Beast (2014–2020)	CAA Centre; Powerade Centre (2005–2018)	2013–2020	5,000	1998	Brampton, Ontario
Charlotte Checkers (1993–2010)	Time Warner Cable Arena; Charlotte Bobcats Arena (2005–2008)	2005–2010	14,100	2005	Charlotte, North Carolina
Charlotte Checkers (1993–2010)	Cricket Arena; Independence Arena (1988–2001)	1993–2005	9,605	1955	Charlotte, North Carolina
Chicago Express (2011–2012)	Sears Centre	2011–2012	9,500	2006	Hoffman Estates, Illinois
Colorado Eagles (2011–2018)	Budweiser Events Center	2003–2018	5,289	2003	Loveland, Colorado
Columbia Inferno (2001–2008)	Carolina Coliseum	2001–2008	12,401	1968	Columbia, South Carolina
Columbus Cottonmouths (2001–2004) Hampton Roads Admirals (1989–2000)	Columbus Civic Center	2001–2004	7,509	1996	Columbus, Georgia
Columbus Cottonmouths (2001–2004) Hampton Roads Admirals (1989–2000)	Norfolk Scope	1989–2000	8,784	1971	Norfolk, Virginia
Dayton Bombers (1991–2009)	Nutter Center	1996–2009	12,000	1990	Fairborn, Ohio
Dayton Bombers (1991–2009)	Hara Arena	1991–1996	5,500	1964	Trotwood, Ohio
Elmira Jackals (2007–2017)	First Arena; Coach USA Center (2000–2004)	2000–2017	3,784	2000	Elmira, New York
Fresno Falcons (2003–2008)	Selland Arena	1995–2003, 2008	11,300	1966	Fresno, California
Fresno Falcons (2003–2008)	Save Mart Center	2003–2008	14,224	2003	Fresno, California
Greensboro Generals (1999–2004)	Greensboro Coliseum	1999–2004	21,273	1959	Greensboro, North Carolina
Greensboro Monarchs (1989–1995)	Greensboro Coliseum	1989–1995	21,273	1959	Greensboro, North Carolina
Greenville Grrrowl (1998–2006)	BI-LO Center	1998–2006	13,707	1998	Greenville, South Carolina
Jackson Bandits (1999–2003) Chesapeake Icebreakers (1997–1999)	Mississippi Coliseum	1999–2003	6,500	1962	Jackson, Mississippi
Jackson Bandits (1999–2003) Chesapeake Icebreakers (1997–1999)	The Show Place Arena	1997–1999	5,800	—	Upper Marlboro, Maryland
Jacksonville Lizard Kings (1995–2000) Louisville IceHawks (1990–1994)	Jacksonville Coliseum	1995–2000	11,000	1960	Jacksonville, Florida
Jacksonville Lizard Kings (1995–2000) Louisville IceHawks (1990–1994)	Broadbent Arena	1990–1994	6,600	1977	Louisville, Kentucky
Las Vegas Wranglers (2003–2014)	Orleans Arena	2003–2014	7,773	2003	Paradise, Nevada
Long Beach Ice Dogs (2003–2007)	Long Beach Convention and Entertainment Center	2003–2007	11,200	1962	Long Beach, California
Louisiana IceGators (1995–2005)	Cajundome	1995–2005	12,068	1985	Lafayette, Louisiana
Manchester Monarchs (2015–2019) Ontario Reign (2008–2015) Texas Wildcatters (2003–2008) Huntington Blizzard (1993–2000)	SNHU Arena; Verizon Wireless Arena (2001–2016)	2015–2019	9,852	2001	Manchester, New Hampshire
Manchester Monarchs (2015–2019) Ontario Reign (2008–2015) Texas Wildcatters (2003–2008) Huntington Blizzard (1993–2000)	Citizens Business Bank Arena	2008–2015	9,736	2008	Ontario, California
Manchester Monarchs (2015–2019) Ontario Reign (2008–2015) Texas Wildcatters (2003–2008) Huntington Blizzard (1993–2000)	Ford Arena	2003–2008	7,736	2003	Beaumont, Texas
Manchester Monarchs (2015–2019) Ontario Reign (2008–2015) Texas Wildcatters (2003–2008) Huntington Blizzard (1993–2000)	Huntington Civic Arena	1993–2000	9,000	1977	Huntington, West Virginia
Mississippi Sea Wolves (1996–2009)	Mississippi Coast Coliseum	1996–2009	9,150	1977	Biloxi, Mississippi
Newfoundland Growlers (2018-2024)	Mary Brown's Centre; Mile One Centre (2001–2021)	2018–2024	6,287	2001	St. John's, Newfoundland and Labrador
New Orleans Brass (1997–2002)	New Orleans Arena	1999–2002	16,500	1999	New Orleans, Louisiana
New Orleans Brass (1997–2002)	Municipal Auditorium	1997–1999	7,853	1930	New Orleans, Louisiana
Pee Dee Pride (1997–2005) Knoxville Cherokees (1988–1997)	Florence Civic Center	1997–2005	7,426	–	Florence, South Carolina
Pee Dee Pride (1997–2005) Knoxville Cherokees (1988–1997)	James White Civic Coliseum	1989–1997	7,141	1961	Knoxville, Tennessee
Pensacola Ice Pilots (1996–2008) Nashville Knights (1989–1996)	Pensacola Civic Center	1996–2008	8,150	1985	Pensacola, Florida
Pensacola Ice Pilots (1996–2008) Nashville Knights (1989–1996)	Nashville Municipal Auditorium	1989–1996	9,700	1962	Nashville, Tennessee
Peoria Rivermen (1996–2005)	Carver Arena	1996–2005	9,542	1982	Peoria, Illinois
Phoenix RoadRunners (2005–2009)	US Airways Center; America West Arena (1992–2005)	2005–2009	16,210	1992	Phoenix, Arizona
Quad City Mallards (2014–2018)	TaxSlayer Center iWireless Center (2007–2017)	2009–2018	9,200	1993	Moline, Illinois
Richmond Renegades (1990–2003)	Richmond Coliseum	1990–2003	11,008	1971	Richmond, Virginia
Roanoke Express (1993–2004)	Roanoke Civic Center	1993–2004	9,828	1971	Roanoke, Virginia
San Diego Gulls (2003–2006)	iPayOne Center; San Diego Sports Arena (1966–2004)	1995–2006	12,900	1966	San Diego, California
San Francisco Bulls(2012–2014)	Cow Palace	2012–2014	11,089	1941	Daly City, California
Trenton Titans (1999–2007, 2011–2013) Trenton Devils (2007–2011)	Sun National Bank Center; Sovereign Bank Arena (1999–2009)	1999–2013	8,100	1999	Trenton, New Jersey
Victoria Salmon Kings (2004–2011) Baton Rouge Kingfish (1996–2004) Erie Panthers (1988–1996)	Save-on-Foods Memorial Centre	2005–2011	7,400	2005	Victoria, British Columbia
Victoria Salmon Kings (2004–2011) Baton Rouge Kingfish (1996–2004) Erie Panthers (1988–1996)	Bear Mountain Arena	2004–2005	2,300	2004	Victoria, British Columbia
Victoria Salmon Kings (2004–2011) Baton Rouge Kingfish (1996–2004) Erie Panthers (1988–1996)	Riverside Centroplex	1996–2003	8,500	Late 1970s	Baton Rouge, Louisiana
Victoria Salmon Kings (2004–2011) Baton Rouge Kingfish (1996–2004) Erie Panthers (1988–1996)	Louis J. Tullio Arena	1988–1996	5,524	1983	Erie, Pennsylvania
