= Sports in Kentucky =

Sports in Kentucky refers to the athletic culture, events, and teams associated with the U.S. state of Kentucky. The state is best known for horse racing, particularly the Kentucky Derby, which is held annually in Louisville and is one of the most famous horse races in the world. Kentucky is also home to major college basketball programs, especially the University of Louisville Cardinals and their rivals the University of Kentucky Wildcats, both of which have strong fan followings and national success. Many successful athletes were born in the State of Kentucky and have gone on to achieve national success, including Muhammad Ali, Pee Wee Reese, Darrell Griffith, and Allan Houston. Many other athletes also started their careers at Kentucky universities, including Lamar Jackson, Ja Morant, Johnny Unitas, Donovan Mitchell, Kenneth Faried, Will Levis, Wes Unseld, and Teddy Bridgewater.

== High school sports ==
Despite the national stereotype that Kentucky is a diehard basketball state, at the high school level the state produces many times over more top nationally ranked football players than basketball. In the past ten years the state has produced many players ranked among the top 20 in their position, notably Tim Couch, Jacob Tamme, Chris Redman, Dennis Johnson, Eric Shelton, Michael Bush, Brian Brohm, Mario Urrutia, Earl Heyman, André Woodson, Micah Johnson, and DeVante Parker. An increasingly growing number of top baseball talent is also coming from Kentucky, such as Brandon Webb, Austin Kearns, Jo Adell, and Paul Byrd.

Louisville has had practically a monopoly on the state's top players since their recent success on the national stage. The football Cardinals have historically depended on the states of Florida and Georgia for a majority of their talent, and currently over 65% of the team's starters are from those two states.

As of 2012, there were six high school rugby teams in Kentucky.

== College sports ==
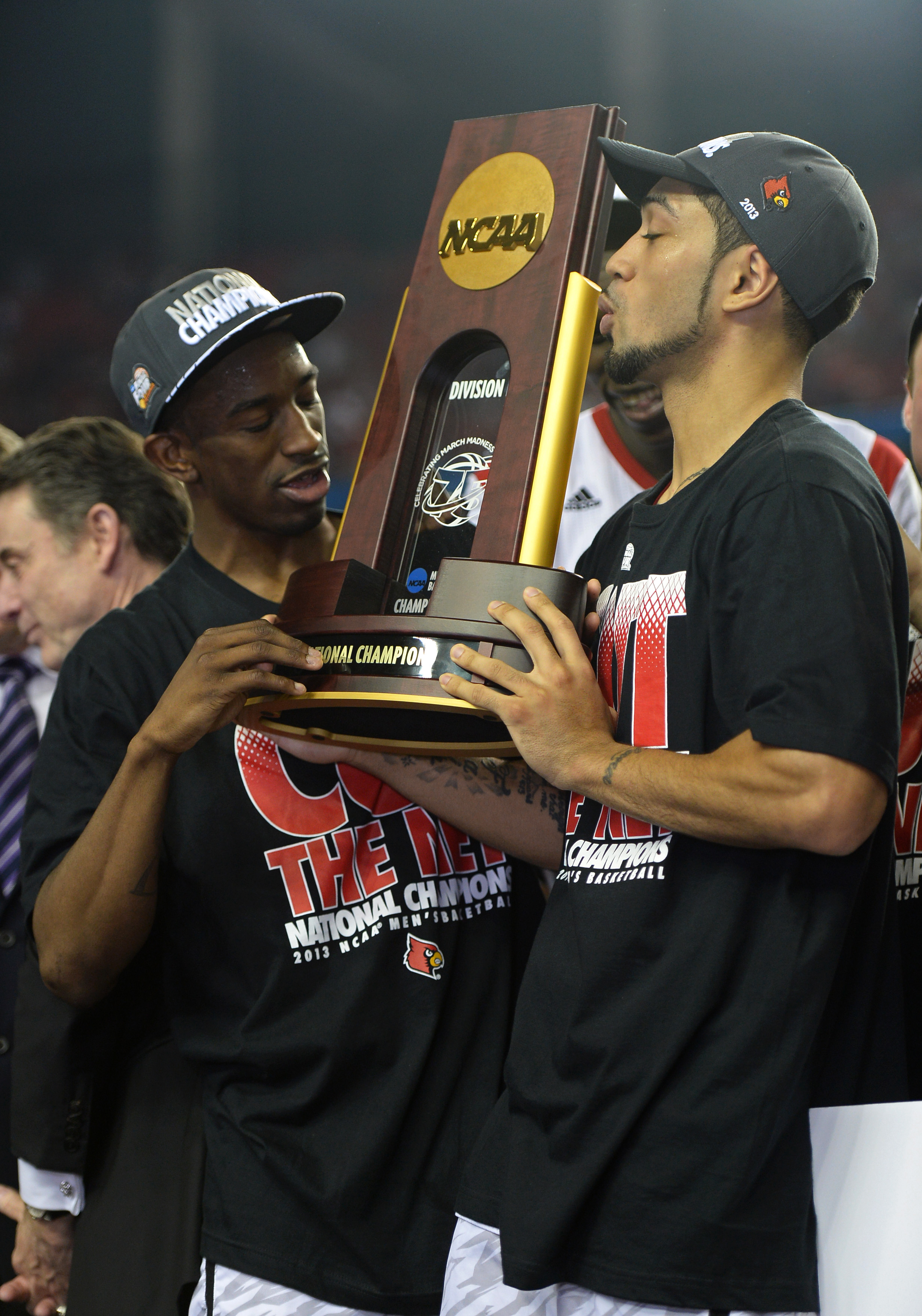

Despite a recent surge in the quality of the University of Louisville football team, and all UofL sports during the "year of the cardinal" or "Louisville slam", college basketball remains the sport of choice in most of Kentucky. Western Kentucky University's men's basketball program is one of the ten most winning in the history of the NCAA, and has one Final Four appearance (1971). Murray State University is a perennial threat to win the Ohio Valley Conference and appear in the NCAA Tournament, having done so 13 times. However, the question in Kentucky college athletics is most often "Red or Blue?" referring to the primary colors of its two flagship universities – the University of Kentucky (blue) and the University of Louisville (red).

In recent years, the Louisville Cardinals have further proven themselves, not only as one of the state's best organized college athletic programs, but elite on the national stage. The University of Louisville Cardinals are consistently the most profitable college sports franchise in the nation, ranking first in Kentucky with a basketball revenue of $42,434,684 during the 2012 fiscal year. Kentucky came in at 5th on the list making $21,598,681. The Cardinals' program has been deemed to have the most equitable fanbase of any school in the country, according to a study conducted by Emory Sports Marketing Analytics. The University of Kentucky is ranked 7th on the list.

=== The Battle for the Bluegrass ===
The rivalry between the North Carolina Tar Heels and the Duke Blue Devils is perhaps the only in-state basketball rivalry that compares on a national scale to the rivalry between the Kentucky Wildcats and Louisville Cardinals.

A 2006 Lexington Herald-Leader article stated that interest in UofL sports is surging across the state of Kentucky, especially in Hopkinsville and Owensboro. An October 21, 2006 Louisville Courier-Journal article also stated that the total sales of UofL merchandise has tripled since 2001 and that the school now ranks 32nd nationally in sales, up from 41st in 2001. UofL ranks 2nd in the Big East Conference and the 3rd highest among all urban universities (to Southern California and Miami) in merchandise sales. UK's merchandise sales have steadily remained around 14th in the nation, by far the best in the state. UofL now has more registered collegiate license plates than the University of Kentucky (18,300 to 17,000); a fourfold increase since 2004. In 1995 UK had a 15,000 plate lead on UofL. It is also important to note that in the last few years the Louisville Cardinals have been the most profitable college sports franchise in the nation and have been deemed to have the most equitable fanbase of any school in the country according to a few studies.

Fuel was added to the fire of this rivalry when Rick Pitino, the UK coach who led the Wildcats to their 1996 National Title before leaving to become coach of the NBA's Boston Celtics, returned to the Bluegrass State to coach the Cardinals in 2001. Many in the state compared the move to the treachery of Benedict Arnold. The situation was exacerbated by the transfer of underachieving Wildcat power forward/center Marvin Stone. Stone's best season with the Cats was his sophomore season, when the former McDonald's All-American averaged 6.0 points and 4.6 rebounds per game. Under Pitino, however, Stone averaged 10.7 points and 7.3 rebounds for the Cards, including a 16-point, 7-rebound, 2-block performance against the Wildcats in an 81–63 Louisville win on December 28.

=== College basketball ===
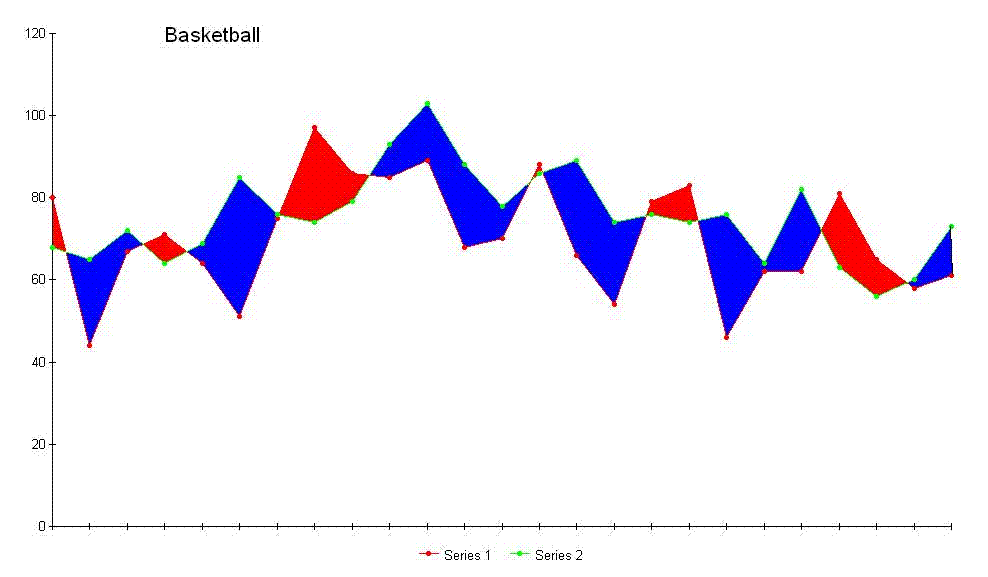

Basketball is the iconic sport in Kentucky today. However, the first organized team on campus is the women's basketball team. Because after the establishment of the sports department, girls often carry out sports activities in response, and female physical educators also take action quickly. Provide professional assistance to any student run sports club. In the past, the relationship between basketball and the Department of physical education was very bad. Florence Stout, director of women's physical education, tried to make this sport a very limited part of her whole teaching plan. There has been no similar project for female students for nearly 20 years. It was not until the end of 1901 that the school council voted to establish a sports department with both men and women.

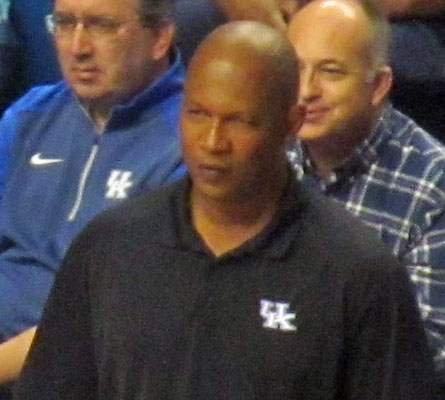
Kenny Payne, Coach for both University of Kentucky and University of Louisville

The origin of basketball is very humble. It took almost 20 years to establish itself as a viable sport and the main element of school. Basketball was invented in 1891. Its origin is similar to college football. Charles Eliota repeatedly called for the end of football and basketball when he was president of Harvard. And football, like basketball, is short of resources and often can't buy the necessary equipment. The famous coach Adolph Rupp held many positions in the university before basketball was slowly proved. It was many years later that the sports department let him focus on basketball training. Gradually, the basketball team developed from a trivial sport to a strong passion.

The modern series, which began in 1983, was started with a win by the Louisville Cardinals. However, in recent years the Kentucky Wildcats have dominated the series, winning 5 of the last 7 meetings. At least three college coaching legends have been associated with programs in the state of Kentucky: Adolph Rupp (UK), Denny Crum (UofL), and Rick Pitino (both UK and UofL). Also, several successful NBA players played in the state, including Pat Riley, Wes Unseld, and Dan Issel. Only the UCLA Bruins have won more NCAA championships than the Kentucky Wildcats, with the Wildcats ranking first in almost every other significant measure of a successful program. In addition to UK and UofL, the Western Kentucky Hilltoppers are also a historically successful basketball program.

In 2011, the University of Pikeville won the NAIA Men's Basketball National Championship, followed only days later by Bellarmine University, who won the 2011 NCAA Men's Basketball Division II National Championship in Springfield, Massachusetts. Both teams began their 2011–2012 seasons ranked #1 in the nation in their respective leagues. Bellarmine has since moved its athletic program to Division I, joining the ASUN Conference in 2020.

| Team | Kentucky Wildcats | Louisville Cardinals | Western Kentucky Hilltoppers |
| All-time win–loss record (rank) | 2,021-637 (1st) | 1,726-874 (12th) | 1,622–720 (14th) |
| All-time winning percentage (rank) | 76.0% (1st) | 66.1% (8th) | 66.5% (7th) |
| NCAA Tourney appearances | 55 (1st) | 41 (5th) | 21 |
| NCAA Tourney wins (rank) | 121 (1st) | 75 (6th) | 18 |
| NCAA Final Fours | 17 (T-2nd) | 10 (T-5th) | 1 |
| NCAA titles | 8 (2nd) | 3 (6th) | 0 |

==== Eras of dominance ====
The impressive history of college basketball in Kentucky has been punctuated by a few notable eras of dominance by the two flagship schools.

===== UK: Rupp's early years =====
Under Adolph Rupp, the Kentucky Wildcats were the most dominant team in the early history of the NCAA Tournament. From 1942 to 1958 the Wildcats won four NCAA titles (1948, 1949, 1951, 1958). They also won the 1942 National Invitation Tournament.

===== UofL: The Team of the 1980s =====
The Louisville Cardinals were dubbed "The Team of the 1980s", winning two national titles during that decade (1980 and 1986). (Only the Indiana Hoosiers equaled this number during the 1980s.) Under coach Denny Crum, UofL was the only team to go to four Final Fours during the decade, and had more wins than any other team over that span. Darrell Griffith won the John Wooden Award in 1980 and in 1986 "Never Nervous" Pervis Ellison became the first freshman to ever be named NCAA Final Four MVP, a feat equaled only by Syracuse's Carmelo Anthony.

===== UK: The Team of the 1990s =====
The Kentucky Wildcats were the most dominant team of the 1990s, winning two national titles (1996 and 1998), with three straight trips to the NCAA Championship game and four total trips to the Final Four. UK's 1996 National Championship team is considered to be the best NCAA team of all time, as evidenced by the nine players on the roster who played in the NBA.

=== Basketball and race ===
Apartheid also existed in sports for a long time. From the first season in 1930 to his retirement in 1972, Adolph Rupp signed only one black player throughout his career in Kentucky. It was not until the 1960s that African American athletes began to be recruited in most regions. Even in the south, where apartheid lasted longer, schools such as Louisville signed their first black players in the early 1960s.

=== College football ===
College football started late in Kentucky. Sports historian Ronald Smith pointed out that as early as the 1850s, football originated from the bullying and entrance ceremony of Freshmen in some schools in the eastern United States. Teachers at universities such as Harvard and Yale were so shocked that they voted to ban the ceremony. The sport was born in the late 19th century. In 1924, the University of Kentucky's school newspaper, the Kentucky Kernel, reported that a group of students from the University of Transylvania had football they had seen for the first time in the blue grass area. In 1880, with the efforts of this group of college students, they ordered a football and a rule book and organized an internal game. And in the following ten years, people knew little about these competitions, and sports "had no special management". The first student sports association was established in 1892. Although the team ushered in the first winning season in 1893, it was plagued by various financial problems in the following decades. In the same year, the school council was disturbed by the informal status of sports on the university playground and the violence of football. Raised objections to the existence of the team. In 1900, it was the only team to beat the powerful Louisville sports club. But with success, more and more accusations came out of thin air that a team in Lexington hired professional players to play at festivals. Then, in view of these dark statements, football became a valuable symbol of masculinity in America's best universities. As Buck became president, the uncertain status of college sports has changed. He said that football is a symbol of good qualities such as courage and perseverance.

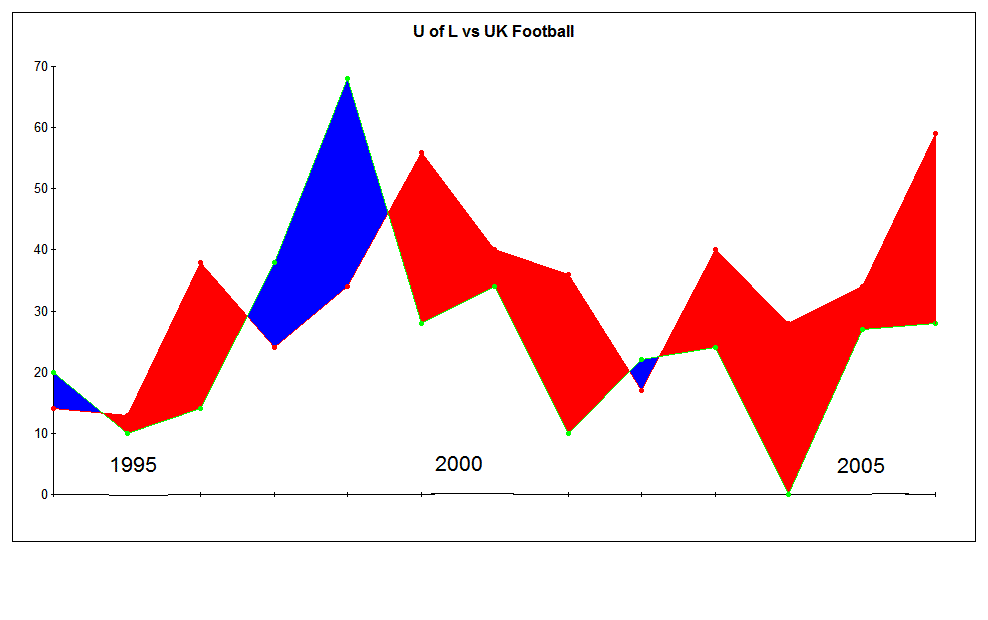
UofL has recently dominated the football rivalry, winning 70% of the games in the Modern Series which began in 1994. UK leads the all-time series, 10–8.

For all their success in basketball, the Kentucky Wildcats have been unable to remain consistently competitive in football. The last two Kentucky football seasons have resulted in an embarrassing 2–10 record. Playing in the brutally competitive Southeastern Conference, the Wildcats won an SEC title in 1950 under legendary coach Paul "Bear" Bryant and shared SEC titles in 1976 and 1977 under Fran Curci. Bryant left the school in 1953; some attribute the move to a conclusion that the football program's popularity would always remain a distant second to the basketball program, at that time coached by Adolph Rupp, a legend in his own right.

UofL hired legendary coach Howard Schnellenberger in 1984. The team has continued to rise under coaches John L. Smith, Bobby Petrino, and Charlie Strong. On November 2, 2006, the 5th-ranked UofL football team defeated the 3rd-ranked West Virginia Mountaineers in what was dubbed "The Dream Game", the second time in Big East history that two top-5 teams had ever met. The game was ranked as the most-viewed ESPN Thursday night football game ever. The game marked a new high in a program that had been on the rise for several years.

Only one week later the Cardinals were defeated by a third undefeated Big East team, the upstart and 15th-ranked Rutgers Scarlet Knights, in what was billed as the biggest college football game in the New York City Metro Area in 60 years; with the Empire State Building even being lit with the Rutgers team colors. The game was also one of the highest rated ESPN Thursday Night games ever as a record crowd in Piscataway, New Jersey stormed the field in celebration. The loss ended the Cardinals' national title hopes, but the team did receive a bid to the FedEx Orange Bowl. On January 2 the Cardinals defeated Wake Forest 24–13 in the Orange Bowl to claim the team's first BCS Bowl win.

More recently, the state has been at the forefront of coaching integration in Division I FBS football. Following the 2009 season, all three of the state's FBS programs filled their coaching vacancies with African Americans. The first to do so was Western Kentucky, who hired Willie Taggart to replace the fired David Elson. Louisville followed suit by hiring Charlie Strong to replace the fired Steve Kragthorpe. Finally, Joker Phillips, who had been the designated successor to Rich Brooks at Kentucky, took over after the latter announced his retirement. The first African American head coach at any of the Division I football programs in Kentucky was Ron Cooper, who coached at Louisville between 1995 and 1997.

The Division I Football Championship Subdivision (FCS) Eastern Kentucky Colonels have held a long tradition of football success. Until the 2009–2010 season, the Colonels were tied with Florida State University for the most consecutive winning seasons (32). In that season, EKU finished 5–6. Eastern returned to the FCS Playoffs in the 2011 season, in which it lost to #17 James Madison 20–17 in the opening round. The Colonels have won 20 Ohio Valley Conference (OVC) titles and two FCS (formerly I-AA) National Championships, in 1979 and 1982. Much of Eastern Kentucky's success came during the long tenure of head coach Roy Kidd, who led the team from 1964 through 2002. The program has continued its success under more recent coaches Danny Hope and Dean Hood.

In 2022, sprint football, a variant played under standard NCAA football rules but with a strictly enforced weight limit of 178 pounds (81 kg) (also with a minimum of 5% body fat), came to Kentucky with the establishment of the Midwest Sprint Football League. Two of the six charter MSFL members are the Bellarmine Knights and Midway Eagles.

=== List of NAIA teams ===
| School | Nickname | Conference |
|---|---|---|
| Alice Lloyd College | Eagles | River States Conference |
| Brescia University | Bearcats | River States Conference |
| Campbellsville University | Tigers | Mid-South Conference |
| University of the Cumberlands | Patriots | Mid-South Conference |
| Georgetown College | Tigers | Mid-South Conference |
| Lindsey Wilson College | Blue Raiders | Mid-South Conference |
| Midway University | Eagles | River States Conference |
| University of Pikeville | Bears | Mid-South Conference |
| Union Commonwealth University | Bulldogs | Mid-South Conference |

=== List of NJCAA Teams ===
| School | Nickname | Division |
|---|---|---|
| Elizabethtown Community and Technical College | Barons | III |
| Simmons College of Kentucky | Panthers | I |

== Professional sports teams ==
Professional football, baseball and basketball all at one time had teams in Kentucky. The National Football League and National League had early franchises in Louisville, and the Kentucky Colonels were a mainstay of the American Basketball Association that joined the National Basketball Association with the ABA-NBA merger in 1976; the Colonels were one of only two ABA teams that were kept out of the merger (the other was the Spirits of St. Louis).

In 2004, the New ABA added a Louisville-based team called the Kentucky Colonels, which was replaced by a team in Murray, Kentucky in 2007. That team was originally also named the Kentucky Colonels, but the name was changed to the Kentucky Retros in March 2007 in deference to the tradition of the Louisville-based teams. The team eventually announced that they would relocate to Louisville. The team folded during the 2007–08 season. Pikeville, Kentucky was also home to pro basketball in the 2007–2008 season, with the East Kentucky Miners joining the Continental Basketball Association. But they met the same fate and folded sometime between 2009 and 2010.

The state's first top-level professional team since the demise of the Colonels is Racing Louisville FC, an expansion team in the National Women's Soccer League that began play in 2021. The NWSL team is owned by Louisville City FC, which has played in the second-level men's league now known as the USL Championship (USLC) since 2015. A second top-level professional team, one of two women's teams operated by Lexington SC, started play in 2024 as one of the eight inaugural members of the USL Super League (USLS), which shares Division I status in the US women's soccer system with the NWSL.

The state is home to several minor league sports teams:

- In minor league baseball, the Louisville Bats of the International League are the AAA affiliate of the Cincinnati Reds. The state has one High-A team in the Bowling Green Hot Rods, which became a member of the South Atlantic League upon Major League Baseball's 2021 reorganization of the minor leagues. Kentucky has two teams that play in independent minor leagues that were designated as "MLB Partner Leagues" in the 2021 reorganization. The Florence Y'alls play in the Frontier League at Thomas More Stadium, and the Lexington Legends of the Atlantic League play at Legends Field in Lexington.
- The aforementioned Louisville City FC began play in the USLC in 2015, when the competition was known as the United Soccer League. They were the reserve team for Orlando City SC of Major League Soccer in that season, but the affiliation ended when Orlando City announced plans to field a team-operated reserve side, Orlando City B, in the USL starting in 2016. Since then, "LouCity" have won two USL Cups in 2017 and 2018, advanced to the Cup final in 2019 and 2022, and were Regular Season runners-up in 2015, 2016, and 2017.
- Lexington SC started play in 2023 with two sides—a men's team in USL League One, one of several third-tier men's leagues, and a women's team in the developmental USL W League. The men's team will move to the USLC in 2025. As noted above, the USLS women's team began play in 2024.
Minor League Baseball in Kentucky

=== Minor league baseball ===
- Louisville Bats (Triple-A affiliate of the Cincinnati Reds in the International League)
- Bowling Green Hot Rods (High-A affiliate of the Tampa Bay Rays in the South Atlantic League)
- Lexington Legends (Independent, Atlantic League)
- Florence Y'alls (Independent, Frontier League)

=== Football ===
==== Professional football ====
- Louisville Kings (United Football League)

==== Semi-pro football ====
- Kentucky Banditz (Impact Developmental Football League, Men's Outdoor)
- Kentucky Spartans (Impact Developmental Football League, Men's Outdoor)
- Western Kentucky Thoroughbreds (Impact Developmental Football League, Men's Outdoor)
- Kentuckiana Kurse (Impact Developmental Football League, Men's Indoor)
- Louisville Kings (Southern Developmental Football Association)

==== Women's football ====
- Derby-City Dynamite (Women's Football Alliance)

=== Basketball ===
- Owensboro Thoroughbreds (The Basketball League)

=== Soccer ===
- Louisville City FC (USL Championship)
- Lexington SC (USL Championship)
- Metro Louisville FC (National Premier Soccer League)
- Lexington Landsharks (Ohio Valley Premier League)
- Racing Louisville FC (National Women's Soccer League)
- Lexington SC (USL Super League)

=== Rugby ===
==== Men's Rugby ====
- Lexington Blackstones RFC (USA Rugby Midwest Men's Division III)
- Louisville Bulls RFC (USA Rugby Midwest Men's Division III)

==== Women's Rugby ====
- Lexington Black Widows
- Louisville Women's Rugby Club/Riversharks (USA Rugby Midwest Women's D2 East Green)

=== Former professional/semi-pro teams ===
- National Football League
  - Louisville Brecks/Colonels (defunct)
- American Basketball Association (original)
  - Kentucky Colonels
- arenafootball2
  - Lexington Horsemen
  - Louisville Fire
- Men's Professional Softball Leagues
  - Kentucky Bourbons
  - Lexington Stallions
- Indoor Football League
  - Louisville Xtreme (played five games in 2021)
- Continental Indoor Football League
  - Kentucky Xtreme (joined IFL for the 2021 season as Louisville Xtreme)
  - Kentucky Drillers
  - Owensboro Rage
  - Bluegrass Warhorses
  - Northern Kentucky River Monsters
- American Indoor Football
  - Northern Kentucky Nightmare
- Mid Continental Football League
  - Louisville Bulls
  - Northern Kentucky Xtreme
  - Hardin County Wolverines
  - Louisville Saints
  - Central Kentucky Chargers/Studs
- Kentucky Amateur Football Teams
  - Derby City Thunder (Kentucky Football League)
  - Kentucky Wolverines (Kentucky Football League)
  - Kentucky Storm (Kentucky Football League)
  - Owensboro Wildcats (Kentucky Football League)
  - Ohio Valley Night Owls (Kentucky Football League)
  - Kentucky Patriots (Alliance Football League)
  - Northern Kentucky Bulldogs (Heartland Football League)
  - Kentucky Warriors (Northern Frontier Football League)
  - Kentucky Coal (Northern Frontier Football League)
  - Kentucky Thoroughbreds (Gridiron Developmental Football League)
  - Lexington Red Dragons (Gridiron Developmental Football League)
  - Kentucky Trojans (Blue Collar Football League)
  - Louisville Piranhas (Blue Collar Football League)
  - Kentuckiana Cavalry (Blue Collar Football League)
- Women's Football Alliance
  - Kentucky Karma (defunct)
- South Atlantic League
  - Lexington Giants (defunct)
  - Lexington Indians (defunct)
  - Lexington Red Sox (defunct)
- Frontier League
  - Tri-State Tomahawks (defunct)
  - Kentucky Rifles (defunct)
- KITTY League
  - Bowling Green Barons (defunct)
  - Paducah Indians/Chiefs (defunct)
  - Hopkinsville Hoppers (defunct)
  - Henderson Hens (defunct)
  - Several Maysville-based teams (defunct)
- Atlantic League
  - Wild Health Genomes (defunct; effectively replaced by a Spire City Ghost Hounds in Frederick, Maryland)
- American Hockey League
  - Kentucky Thoroughblades (moved to Cleveland, Ohio and became the Cleveland Barons (2001-2006), would move to Worcester, Massachusetts as the Worcester Sharks, and since 2015 have played in San Jose, California as the San Jose Barracuda)
  - Louisville Panthers (moved to Des Moines, Iowa as the Iowa Stars and later known as the Iowa Chops; moved again to the Austin suburb of Cedar Park, Texas in 2009, where they are now the Texas Stars)
- ECHL
  - Lexington Men O' War (moved to the Salt Lake City area and became the Utah Grizzlies)
  - Louisville Icehawks (moved to Florida to become the Jacksonville Lizard Kings; defunct since 2000)
  - Louisville RiverFrogs (moved to Miami, Florida and became the Miami Matadors, was inactive for two years; moved to Ohio in 2001 to become the Cincinnati Cyclones)
- National Professional Soccer League
  - Louisville Thunder
- USISL
  - Lexington Bluegrass Bandits
  - Louisville Thoroughbreds
- Major Arena Soccer League/Premier Arena Soccer League
  - Louisville Lightning (original defunct 2010–11; revived early 2020, ceased operations early 2021)
- USL League Two (formerly Premier Development League)
  - Derby City Rovers (formerly known as River City Rovers; folded in July 2018)
- American Basketball Association (2000-)
  - Kentucky Retros (defunct)
  - Kentucky Colonels (defunct)
  - Kentucky Pro Cats (defunct)
  - Kentucky Mavericks (defunct)
  - Kentucky Bisons (folded in 2010)
  - Bluegrass Stallions (joined the PBL for the 2010–11 season; folded in 2011)
- Continental Basketball Association
  - East Kentucky Miners (defunct)
- American Ultimate Disc League
  - Bluegrass Revolution (moved to Cincinnati, Ohio in 2013 to become the Cincinnati Revolution; franchise folded in 2016)
- North American Lacrosse League
  - Kentucky Stickhorses (folded in 2013)
- NASCAR Busch Series race team Keith Coleman Racing, based in Eddyville (defunct)
- NASCAR Busch Series race team Brewco Motorsports, was based in Central City but now renamed Baker-Curb Racing and moved to Nashville (defunct)

== Motorsport ==
Indianapolis 500 winner Danny Sullivan was born in Louisville. Kentucky Motor Speedway opened in 1960 and was the home track of Owensboro natives Darrell Waltrip, Michael Waltrip and Jeremy Mayfield. MotoGP world champion Nicky Hayden and his brothers Tommy Hayden and Roger Lee Hayden were also born in Owensboro.

Louisville Motor Speedway hosted NASCAR Truck Series races from 1995 to 1999. Kentucky Speedway opened in 2000 to host IndyCar Series, NASCAR Truck Series, NASCAR Xfinity Series, and later NASCAR Cup Series races.

== Horse racing ==
Churchill Downs opened in 1875 and is home of the Kentucky Derby, part of the American Triple Crown of Thoroughbred Racing. The venue has also hosted several editions of the Breeders' Cup.

Keeneland opened in 1936 and hosts the Blue Grass Stakes and Shadwell Turf Mile Stakes. Other Thoroughbred racetracks include Kentucky Downs, Ellis Park and Turfway Park. In addition, The Red Mile is one of the major harness racing venues in the country, hosting the Kentucky Futurity.

== Venues ==
Venues with a minimum capacity of 5,000 are listed here.

| Venue | City | Capacity | Type | Tenant(s) | Opened |
|---|---|---|---|---|---|
| Kentucky Speedway | Sparta | 86,000 | Motorsports | No races; previously Quaker State 400 | 1998 |
| Kroger Field | Lexington | 61,000 | Football | Kentucky Wildcats | 1973 |
| L&N Federal Credit Union Stadium | Louisville | 60,800 | Football | Louisville Cardinals | 1998 |
| Churchill Downs | Louisville | 50,000 | Horse Racing | Multiple races, most notably Kentucky Derby and Kentucky Oaks | 1875 (Note: Date of track opening. The current grandstands were first built in 1895, and have been expanded and renovated many times since.) |
| Houchens Industries–L. T. Smith Stadium | Bowling Green | 22,113 | Football | Western Kentucky Hilltoppers | 1968 |
| KFC Yum! Center | Louisville | 22,090 | Basketball | Louisville Cardinals | 2010 |
| Rupp Arena | Lexington | 20,545 | Basketball | Kentucky Wildcats | 1976 |
| Roy Kidd Stadium | Richmond | 20,000 | Football | Eastern Kentucky Colonels | 1969 |
| Freedom Hall | Louisville | 18,252 | Multi-purpose | No current team; previously Louisville Cardinals and Bellarmine Knights basketball | 1956 |
| Roy Stewart Stadium | Murray | 16,800 | Football | Murray State Racers | 1973 |
| Louisville Slugger Field | Louisville | 13,131 | Baseball | Louisville Bats | 2000 |
| Lynn Family Stadium | Louisville | 11,700 (Note: Fixed capacity; 15,304 with standing room.) | Soccer | Louisville City FC, Racing Louisville FC | 2020 |
| Manual Memorial Stadium | Louisville | 11,463 | Football (high school) | Manual Crimsons | 1954 (Note: On-site replacement of a 1924 stadium of the same name.) |
| Jayne Stadium | Morehead | 10,000 | Football, soccer | Morehead State Eagles | 1964 |
| Truist Arena | Highland Heights | 9,400 | Basketball | Northern Kentucky Norse | 2008 |
| CFSB Center | Murray | 8,825 | Basketball | Murray State Racers | 1998 |
| Keeneland | Lexington | 8,799 | Horse Racing | Multiple races | 1936 |
| Memorial Stadium–McRight Field | Paducah | 8,500 | Football (high school) | Paducah Tilghman Blue Tornado | 1956 |
| T. T. Knight Stadium | Louisville | 8,500 | Football (high school) | Southern Trojans | |
| Maxwell Field | Louisville | 8,000 | Football (high school) | Male Bulldogs | |
| Lexington SC Stadium | Lexington | 7,500 | Soccer | Lexington SC (men and women) | 2024 |
| Reid Stadium | Owensboro | 7,500 | Football (high school) | Daviess County Panthers | 2019 |
| E. A. Diddle Arena | Bowling Green | 7,326 | Basketball | Western Kentucky Hilltoppers and Lady Toppers | 1963 |
| Clark Field | Somerset | 7,000 | Football (high school) | Somerset Briar Jumpers | |
| Legends Field | Lexington | 6,994 (Note: Fixed capacity; various picnic and grass seating areas bring the full capacity to over 9,000.) | Baseball | Lexington Legends, Wild Health Genomes (2022 only) | 2001 |
| Broadbent Arena | Louisville | 6,600 | Multi-purpose | | 1956 |
| Baptist Health Arena | Richmond | 6,500 | Basketball | Eastern Kentucky Colonels | 1963 |
| Eastern Field | Middletown (Note: Preferred mailing address is Louisville. Middletown is one of the 83 cities that retained their city limits following the 2003 merger of the governments of Louisville and surrounding Jefferson County.) | 6,500 | Football (high school) | Eastern Eagles | |
| Ellis Johnson Arena | Morehead | 6,500 | Basketball | Morehead State Eagles | 1981 |
| Memorial Coliseum | Lexington | 6,500 | Basketball | Kentucky Wildcats | 1950 |
| Brother Thomas More Page Stadium | Louisville | 6,200 | Football | St. Xavier Tigers (high school), Bellarmine Knights sprint football | 2007 |
| Harrison County Athletic Complex | Cynthiana | 6,000 | Football (high school) | Harrison County Thorobreds | |
| Louisville Gardens | Louisville | 6,000 | Multi-purpose | | 1905 |
| Reed Conder Memorial Gymnasium | Draffenville (Note: Physically located in Draffenville; mailing address in Benton.) | 6,000 | Basketball (high school) | Marshall County Marshals | |
| Viking Stadium | Morehead | 6,000 | Football (high school) | Rowan County Vikings | |
| Appalachian Wireless Arena | Pikeville | 5,700 (Note: Fixed capacity; concert capacity is up to 7,000.) | Basketball | Pikeville Bears | 2005 |
| Alltech Arena | Lexington | 5,517 | Equestrianism | | 2009 |
| El Donaldson Stadium | Bowling Green | 5,500 | Football (high school) | Bowling Green Purples | |
| Putnam Stadium | Ashland | 5,500 | Football (high school) | Ashland Tomcats | |
| Racer Arena | Murray | 5,500 | Volleyball (Note: Originally a basketball arena; reconfigured as volleyball-specific after the opening of CFSB Center.) | Murray State Racers | 1954 |
| Shawnee Alumni Stadium | Louisville | 5,500 | Football (high school) | Shawnee Golden Eagles | |
| Mason County Fieldhouse | Maysville | 5,400 | Basketball (high school) | Mason County Royals | |
| Roy L. Winchester Gymnasium | New Castle | 5,400 | Basketball (high school) | Henry County Wildcats | |
| Dr. Mark & Cindy Lynn Stadium | Louisville | 5,300 | Soccer | Louisville Cardinals | 2014 |
| Eagles' Nest | Mayfield | 5,200 | Basketball (high school) | Graves County Eagles | |
| Alumni Field | Frankfort | 5,000 | Football | Kentucky State Thorobreds | |
| Badgett Athletic Complex | Madisonville | 5,000 | Football (high school) | Madisonville–North Hopkins Maroons | |
| Baker Field | Morganfield | 5,000 | Football (high school) | Union County Braves | |
| Boyd County Middle School Gymnasium | Summit (Note: Physically located in Summit; mailing address in Ashland.) | 5,000 | Basketball (high school) | Boyd County Lions (HS) | |
| Bradner Stadium | Middlesboro | 5,000 | Football (high school) | Middlesboro Yellowjackets | |
| Colonel Stadium | Henderson | 5,000 | Football (high school) | Henderson County Colonels | |
| Cunningham Stadium | Mount Sterling | 5,000 | Football (high school) | Montgomery County Indians | |
| Davis Memorial Stadium | Rosspoint (Note: Physically located in Rosspoint; mailing address in Baxter.) | 5,000 | Football (high school) | Harlan County Black Bears | |
| Dr. Robert J. Bell Stadium | Lexington | 5,000 | Football (high school) | Henry Clay Blue Devils | |
| Fryar Stadium | Fort Campbell (Note: Physically located on the Tennessee side of the Fort Campbell Army post; all mailing addresses on the post are in Kentucky.) | 5,000 | Football (high school) | Fort Campbell Falcons (Note: Although Fort Campbell High School physically lies in Tennessee, it is a member of the Kentucky High School Athletic Association, presumably because the U.S. Department of Defense Education Activity administers schools on Fort Campbell and Fort Knox (the latter entirely within Kentucky) as parts of a single district.) | |
| Henry R. Evans/Ivan McGlone Stadium | Flatwoods (Note: The playing field is bisected by the Flatwoods/Russell city boundary, with the main grandstand in Flatwoods. The mailing address is in Russell.) | 5,000 | Football (high school) | Russell Red Devils | |
| Jack D. Rose Stadium | Murray | 5,000 | Football (high school) | Calloway County Lakers | |
| Jon R. Akers Stadium | Lexington | 5,000 | Football (high school) | Paul Laurence Dunbar Bulldogs | |
| Lions Stadium | Cannonsburg (Note: Physically located in Cannonsburg; mailing address in Ashland.) | 5,000 | Football (high school) | Boyd County Lions | |
| Morton Combs Athletic Complex | Hindman | 5,000 | Basketball (high school) | Knott County Central Patriots | |
| Owensboro Sportscenter | Owensboro | 5,000 | Basketball | Kentucky Wesleyan Panthers, Owensboro Thoroughbreds, Owensboro Catholic Aces (HS) | 1949 |
| Pat Crawford Stadium | Louisville | 5,000 | Football (high school) | Ballard Bruins | |
| Pike Central Stadium | Pikeville (Note: Physically located in an unincorporated area of Pike County with a Pikeville mailing address.) | 5,000 | Football (high school) | Pike County Central Hawks | |
| Preston Young Complex | Louisville | 5,000 | Football (high school) | Western Warriors | |
| Pulaski County High School Gym | Somerset | 5,000 | Basketball (high school) | Pulaski County Maroons | |
| Stadium of Champions | Hopkinsville | 5,000 (Note: The KHSAA lists both Christian County and Hopkinsville High Schools as tenants of the Stadium of Champions, but the two schools' entries disagree on the capacity. The Christian County entry gives 5,000 and the Hopkinsville entry 15,000. It is more likely that the Hopkinsville entry is in error.) | Football (high school) | Christian County Colonels, Hopkinsville Tigers | |
| Toyota Stadium | Georgetown | 5,000 | Football | Georgetown Tigers, Lexington SC | 1997 |
| War Memorial Stadium | Mayfield | 5,000 | Football (high school) | Mayfield Cardinals | |

== See also ==
- Sports in Louisville, Kentucky
