= Sheldon Gorski =

Canadian ice hockey player

- Born: October 16, 1965 (age 59); Grenfell, Saskatchewan, Canada
- Height: 5 ft 10 in (178 cm)
- Weight: 183 lb (83 kg; 13 st 1 lb)
- Position: Right wing
- Shot: Right
- Played for: Illinois–Chicago; Indianapolis Ice; Louisville Icehawks; San Antonio Iguanas; Louisville RiverFrogs; Miami Matadors; Pensacola Ice Pilots; Rockford IceHogs
- Playing career: 1986–2001

Sheldon Gorski is a Canadian ice hockey coach and former right wing who was an All-American for Illinois–Chicago.

== Career ==
Gorski's final season of junior hockey resulted in him leading the SJHL in goals and he signed an athletic scholarship with Illinois–Chicago. He joined the Flames as they were on the ascent and helped the team produce its first 20-win season as a sophomore. An injury limited Gorski in his junior season but he returned in force as a senior, scoring a program record 38 goals and becoming the all-time program leader with 86 markers. He was named as an All-American and led UIC to their best season in 1989, finishing 3rd in the CCHA standings and getting out of the conference quarterfinals for the only time in program history.

After graduating with a degree in Kinesiology and Exercise Science, Gorski took a year off before pursuing a professional career. He debuted for the Louisville Icehawks in the ECHL and was an instant success with the team, leading them in scoring for their inaugural season. Gorski was again the team's leader in 1992 and pushed the Icehawks all the way to the Riley Cup finals. After a third season of 50 goals, Gorski missed a large chunk of 1994 with an injury and then had to find a new home when the Icehawks suspended operations after the season. He landed with the San Antonio Iguanas, finishing 3rd in team scoring and helping the club reach the Ray Miron President's Cup final.

Gorski was back in both the ECHL and Louisville the following year when a new franchise, the Louisville RiverFrogs, began playing. He twice led the team in scoring but was forced to move once again when the team dissolved in 1998. He split his time between two ECHL teams in 1999 and then ended his playing career with the Rockford IceHogs in 2000.

Immediately after his retirement, Gorski began to work as a teacher at the FranCenter in Darien, Illinois. He also doubled as the lead instructor at the Northern Edge Hockey School for 14 years. In 2015, while remaining a teacher at the FranCenter, Gorski began working both with the Canadian Professional Hockey School and the Sabre Hockey Association as an instructor and coach, all three positions he continues to fulfil as of 2021.

Gorski was inducted into the UIC Athletic Hall of Fame in 2000 and the ECHL Hall of Fame in 2012.

== Statistics ==
=== Regular season and playoffs ===
			Regular Season					Playoffs
Season	Team	League	GP	G	A	Pts	PIM	GP	G	A	Pts	PIM
1984–85	Melville Millionaires	SJHL	62	79	49	128	105	—	—	—	—	—
1985–86	Illinois–Chicago	CCHA	37	18	11	29	48	—	—	—	—	—
1986–87	Illinois–Chicago	CCHA	39	18	20	38	50	—	—	—	—	—
1987–88	Illinois–Chicago	CCHA	24	12	15	27	42	—	—	—	—	—
1988–89	Illinois–Chicago	CCHA	41	38	22	60	68	—	—	—	—	—
1990–91	Indianapolis Ice	IHL	3	1	0	1	0	—	—	—	—	—
1990–91	Louisville Icehawks	ECHL	62	51	53	104	106	7	5	4	9	20
1991–92	Louisville Icehawks	ECHL	55	56	54	110	94	13	14	8	22	15
1992–93	Louisville Icehawks	ECHL	63	51	47	98	103	—	—	—	—	—
1993–94	Louisville Icehawks	ECHL	41	22	28	50	85	6	1	7	8	4
1994–95	San Antonio Iguanas	CHL	57	45	26	71	96	13	15	12	27	12
1995–96	Louisville RiverFrogs	ECHL	48	21	18	39	47	3	1	1	2	8
1996–97	Louisville RiverFrogs	ECHL	66	38	35	73	96	—	—	—	—	—
1997–98	Louisville RiverFrogs	ECHL	68	46	29	75	114	—	—	—	—	—
1998–99	Miami Matadors	ECHL	36	15	11	26	46	—	—	—	—	—
1998–99	Pensacola Ice Pilots	ECHL	32	16	17	33	24	—	—	—	—	—
1999–00	Rockford IceHogs	UHL	67	14	24	38	67	3	0	0	0	4
ECHL totals			471	316	292	608	715	29	21	20	41	47

== Awards and honors ==
Award	Year
All-CCHA First Team	1988–89
AHCA West Second-Team All-American	1988–89
CCHA All-Tournament Team	1989
ECHL Second–Team All–Star	1990–91
ECHL First–Team All–Star	1991–92
