= Kirk Daubenspeck =

American ice hockey player (born 1974)

- Born: July 21, 1974 (age 52) Madison, Wisconsin, USA
- Height: 6 ft 0 in (183 cm)
- Weight: 190 lb (86 kg; 13 st 8 lb)
- Position: Goaltender
- Caught: Left
- Played for: Indianapolis Ice; Jacksonville Lizard Kings; Chesapeake Icebreakers; Rochester Americans; South Carolina Stingrays; Orlando Solar Bears; Colorado Gold Kings; Worcester IceCats; Portland Pirates; Hershey Bears
- NHL draft: 151st overall, 1992; Philadelphia Flyers
- Playing career: 1993–2006

Kirk Daubenspeck (born July 21, 1974) is an American retired ice hockey goaltender who was an All-America for Wisconsin.

== Career ==
Daubenspeck was drafted by the Philadelphia Flyers in 1992 straight out of Culver Military Academy. He spent the following season playing in the USHL before beginning his college career with the Wisconsin Badgers. After playing just seven games in his freshman season, Daubenspeck's rights were traded along with Claude Boivin to the Ottawa Senators for Mark Lamb. Entering his sophomore season, Daubenspeck got into a competition to replace the departed Jim Carey as the Badger's primary starter. He won the job and remained as Wisconsin's top goalie for the rest of his time in Madison. In his first year as the starter, Daubenspeck won 23 games and helped Wisconsin win the WCHA championship for which he was named tournament MVP. Wisconsin declined after 1995 and fell in the standings. Despite the decline, Daubenspeck remained respected and was named an All-American in 1997 even though he possessed a losing record and less-than-stellar numbers.

After graduating, Daubenspeck signed a rookie contract with Ottawa and participated in their training camp that September. Just before the season began, he was traded to the Chicago Blackhawks for a 6th round draft pick. Daubenspeck began the year as a backup behind Jeff Hackett. He remained with the team for the first month of the season, not seeing any game action, and was then sent down to the Indianapolis Ice. He played a few games at the IHL level before ending up with the Jacksonville Lizard Kings. Daubenspeck spent most of the rest of his career playing AA hockey, making brief appearances with several AHL teams over a nine year span. In 2001, Daubenspeck helped the South Carolina Stingrays win the Kelly Cup, playing in 13 of the team's 18 playoff games. He retired as a player in 2006.

== Accident ==
On February 17, 2011, Daubenspeck was involved in a car accident on Route 18. While driving in heavy fog near Dodgeville, Wisconsin, Daubenspeck's car ran into a Semi-trailer truck. He suffered a severe brain injury and was in a coma for six days. While to took several months, Daubenspeck did eventually recover from the crash. A year to the day after the accident, he dropped the ceremonial puck before a game between Wisconsin and Denver.

== Statistics ==
=== Regular season and playoffs ===
			Regular season									Playoffs
Season	Team	League	GP	W	L	T	MIN	GA	SO	GAA	SV%	GP	W	L	MIN	GA	SO	GAA	SV%
1990–91	Culver Military Academy	US-Prep	—	—	—	—	—	—	—	—	—	—	—	—	—	—	—	—	—
1991–92	Culver Military Academy	US-Prep	—	—	—	—	—	—	—	2.88	.912	—	—	—	—	—	—	—	—
1992–93	Sioux City Musketeers	USHL	9	0	7	1	470	49	0	6.26	.837	—	—	—	—	—	—	—	—
1992–93	Wisconsin Capitols	USHL	28	5	20	1	1542	123	0	4.79	.886	—	—	—	—	—	—	—	—
1993–94	Wisconsin	WCHA	7	2	2	0	280	19	0	4.07	.880	—	—	—	—	—	—	—	—
1994–95	Wisconsin	WCHA	42	23	15	4	2503	146	0	3.50	.893	—	—	—	—	—	—	—	—
1995–96	Wisconsin	WCHA	39	17	20	2	2257	151	0	4.01	.885	—	—	—	—	—	—	—	—
1996–97	Wisconsin	WCHA	33	13	18	2	1925	124	1	3.86	.896	—	—	—	—	—	—	—	—
1997–98	Indianapolis Ice	IHL	18	6	9	0	953	58	0	3.65	.887	—	—	—	—	—	—	—	—
1997–98	Jacksonville Lizard Kings	ECHL	32	20	9	2	1865	92	1	2.96	.904	—	—	—	—	—	—	—	—
1998–99	Jacksonville Lizard Kings	ECHL	8	5	3	0	424	18	0	2.55	.908	—	—	—	—	—	—	—	—
1998–99	Indianapolis Ice	IHL	12	2	8	1	650	43	0	3.97	.879	—	—	—	—	—	—	—	—
1998–99	Chesapeake Icebreakers	ECHL	13	7	2	4	774	31	2	2.40	.920	7	—	—	—	—	—	—	—
1999–00	South Carolina Stingrays	ECHL	6	4	2	0	360	17	0	2.83	.902	—	—	—	—	—	—	—	—
1999–00	Rochester Americans	AHL	22	7	10	4	1235	53	1	2.57	.913	1	—	—	—	—	—	—	—
2000–01	Rochester Americans	AHL	1	0	1	0	60	6	0	6.00	.769	—	—	—	—	—	—	—	—
2000–01	Indianapolis Ice	IHL	2	0	1	0	77	3	0	2.34	.870	—	—	—	—	—	—	—	—
2000–01	South Carolina Stingrays	ECHL	45	26	13	3	2624	119	3	2.72	.915	13	—	—	—	—	—	—	—
2001–02	Colorado Gold Kings	WCHL	60	36	19	5	3539	164	4	2.78	.906	5	—	—	—	—	—	—	—
2002–03	South Carolina Stingrays	ECHL	58	36	16	6	3454	167	0	2.90	.915	4	—	—	—	—	—	—	—
2003–04	Worcester IceCats	AHL	1	0	1	0	59	2	0	2.04	.923	—	—	—	—	—	—	—	—
2003–04	South Carolina Stingrays	ECHL	47	29	15	2	2773	123	3	2.66	.920	7	—	—	—	—	—	—	—
2004–05	Portland Pirates	AHL	28	14	12	1	1507	58	4	2.31	.930	—	—	—	—	—	—	—	—
2004–05	South Carolina Stingrays	ECHL	25	12	10	3	1437	55	2	2.30	.934	1	—	—	—	—	—	—	—
2005–06	South Carolina Stingrays	ECHL	2	2	0	0	120	2	0	1.00	.958	—	—	—	—	—	—	—	—
2005–06	Hershey Bears	AHL	23	10	6	2	1115	58	2	3.12	.895	—	—	—	—	—	—	—	—
USHL totals			37	5	27	2	2,012	172	0	5.13	.875	—	—	—	—	—	—	—	—
NCAA totals			120	55	55	8	6,965	440	1	3.79	.891	—	—	—	—	—	—	—	—
ECHL totals			236	141	70	20	13,831	624	11	2.71	.917	32	—	—	—	—	—	—	—
IHL totals			32	8	18	1	1,680	104	0	3.71	.883	—	—	—	—	—	—	—	—
AHL totals			75	31	30	7	3,976	177	7	2.67	.913	1	—	—	—	—	—	—	—

== Awards and honors ==
Award	Year
WCHA All-Tournament Team	1995, 1996
All-WCHA Second Team	1996–97
AHCA West Second-Team All-American	1996–97

Awards and achievements
Preceded by Chris McAlpine	WCHA Most Valuable Player in Tournament; 1995	Succeeded by Brian Bonin
