= 1998–99 ECHL season =

Ice hockey league season

The 1998–99 ECHL season was the 11th season of the ECHL. Before the start of the season, the league saw the Louisville RiverFrogs move to Miami, FL and the Raleigh Icecaps move to Augusta, GA as well as welcoming two new franchises in Estero, FL and Greenville, SC. The Pee Dee Pride finished first overall in the regular season, winning the Brabham Cup and the Mississippi Sea Wolves won their first Kelly Cup defeating the Richmond Renegades four games to three.

== Regular season ==
=== Final standings ===
Note: GP = Games played; W = Wins; L= Losses; T = Ties; GF = Goals for; GA = Goals against; Pts = Points; Green shade = Clinched playoff spot; Blue shade = Clinched division; (z) = Clinched home-ice advantage

==== Northern Conference ====
Northeast Division	GP	W	L	T	Pts	GF	GA
Roanoke Express	70	38	22	10	86	224	201
Hampton Roads Admirals	70	38	24	8	84	215	213
Richmond Renegades	70	40	27	3	83	239	196
Chesapeake Icebreakers	70	34	25	11	79	229	206
Johnstown Chiefs	70	27	34	9	63	218	265

Northwest Division	GP	W	L	T	PTS	GF	GA
Columbus Chill	70	39	24	7	85	257	242
Peoria Rivermen	70	39	25	6	84	243	230
Toledo Storm	70	39	26	5	83	256	246
Dayton Bombers	70	34	27	9	77	239	241
Huntington Blizzard	70	31	33	6	68	221	253
Wheeling Nailers	70	27	37	6	60	206	249

==== Southern Conference ====
Southeast Division	GP	W	L	T	PTS	GF	GA
Pee Dee Pride	70	51	15	4	106	289	191
Florida Everblades	70	45	20	5	95	253	180
South Carolina Stingrays	70	40	20	10	90	235	216
Augusta Lynx	70	38	27	5	81	235	233
Jacksonville Lizard Kings	70	35	33	2	72	235	255
Charlotte Checkers	70	29	30	11	69	221	262
Miami Matadors	70	28	32	10	66	208	266
Greenville Grrrowl	70	26	33	11	63	208	241

Southwest Division	GP	W	L	T	PTS	GF	GA
Louisiana IceGators	70	46	18	6	98	297	205
Mississippi Sea Wolves	70	41	22	7	89	251	215
Birmingham Bulls	70	37	29	4	78	251	267
New Orleans Brass	70	30	27	13	73	244	261
Mobile Mysticks	70	31	31	8	70	231	259
Baton Rouge Kingfish	70	30	30	10	70	222	228
Tallahassee Tiger Sharks	70	27	34	9	63	212	250
Pensacola Ice Pilots	70	25	41	4	54	199	267

== Kelly Cup playoffs ==
Conference Wild Card
6	Augusta	0
11	Baton Rouge	2
8	New Orleans	2
9	Jacksonville	0
7	Birmingham	2
10	Mobile	0

Conference Quarterfinals
1	Roanoke	3
8	Dayton	1
2	Columbus	1
7	Chesapeake	3
3	Peoria	1
6	Toledo	3
4	Hampton Roads	1
5	Richmond	3
1	Pee Dee	3
11	Baton Rouge	1
2	Louisiana	2
8	New Orleans	3
3	Florida	3
7	Birmingham	0
4	South Carolina	0
5	Mississippi	3

Conference Semifinals
1	Roanoke	3
7	Chesapeake	1
Northern Conference
6	Toledo	0
5	Richmond	3
1	Pee Dee	3
8	New Orleans	1
Southern Conference
3	Florida	0
5	Mississippi	3

Conference Finals
1	Roanoke	0
5	Richmond	4
1	Pee Dee	1
5	Mississippi	4

Kelley Cup Finals
N5	Richmond	3
S5	Mississippi	4

=== Northern Conference ===
==== Quarterfinals ====
(1) Roanoke vs. (8) Dayton
Date	Away	Home
April 7	Dayton 3	Roanoke 5
April 9	Dayton 1	Roanoke 3
April 10	Roanoke 0	Dayton 5
April 12	Roanoke 4	Dayton 1
Roanoke wins series 3–1

(2) Columbus vs. (7) Chesapeake
Date	Away	Home	
April 7	Chesapeake 3	Columbus 5	
April 8	Chesapeake 3	Columbus 2	
April 9	Columbus 2	Chesapeake 5	
April 11	Columbus 1	Chesapeake 2	OT
Chesapeake wins series 3–1

(3) Peoria vs. (6) Toledo
Date	Away	Home
April 6	Toledo 2	Peoria 8
April 7	Toledo 5	Peoria 1
April 9	Peoria 3	Toledo 6
April 10	Peoria 1	Toledo 4
Toledo wins series 3–1

(4) Hampton Roads vs. (5) Richmond
Date	Away	Home
April 7	Richmond 1	Hampton Roads 6
April 9	Richmond 9	Hampton Roads 0
April 10	Hampton Roads 2	Richmond 5
April 13	Hampton Roads 3	Richmond 4
Richmond wins series 3–1

==== Semifinals ====
(1) Roanoke vs. (7) Chesapeake
Date	Away	Home
April 16	Chesapeake 1	Roanoke 2
April 17	Chesapeake 1	Roanoke 2
April 23	Roanoke 0	Chesapeake 2
April 24	Roanoke 1	Chesapeake 0
Roanoke wins series 3–1

(5) Richmond vs. (6) Toledo
Date	Away	Home
April 19	Toledo 3	Richmond 4
April 21	Toledo 3	Richmond 5
April 23	Richmond 4	Toledo 1
Richmond wins series 3–0

==== Finals ====
(1) Roanoke vs. (5) Richmond
Date	Away	Home	
April 30	Richmond 3	Roanoke 2	OT
May 1	Richmond 3	Roanoke 0	
May 5	Roanoke 0	Richmond 3	
May 7	Roanoke 2	Richmond 4	
Richmond wins series 4–0

=== Southern Conference ===
==== Wild Card ====
(6) Augusta vs. (11) Baton Rouge
Date	Away	Home
April 5	Baton Rouge 3	Augusta 0
April 6	Augusta 2	Baton Rouge 3
Baton Rouge wins series 2–0

(7) Birmingham vs. (10) Mobile
Date	Away	Home
April 5	Mobile 2	Birmingham 3
April 6	Birmingham 6	Mobile 3
Birmingham wins series 2–0

(8) New Orleans vs. (9) Jacksonville
Date	Away	Home
April 6	Jacksonville 3	New Orleans 5
April 7	New Orleans 5	Jacksonville 3
New Orleans wins series 2–0

==== Quarterfinals ====
(1) Pee Dee vs. (11) Baton Rouge
Date	Away	Home	
April 10	Baton Rouge 3	Pee Dee 6	
April 11	Baton Rouge 1	Pee Dee 6	
April 15	Pee Dee 1	Baton Rouge 2	OT
April 16	Pee Dee 4	Baton Rouge 1	
Pee Dee wins series 3–1

(2) Louisiana vs. (8) New Orleans
Date	Away	Home
April 11	New Orleans 2	Louisiana 4
April 13	Louisiana 1	New Orleans 3
April 14	New Orleans 2	Louisiana 3
April 16	Louisiana 0	New Orleans 3
April 18	New Orleans 3	Louisiana 2
New Orleans wins series 3–2

(3) Florida vs. (7) Birmingham
Date	Away	Home
April 10	Birmingham 0	Florida 3
April 11	Birmingham 3	Florida 4
April 14	Florida 9	Birmingham 2
Florida wins series 3–0

(4) South Carolina vs. (5) Mississippi
Date	Away	Home	
April 1	Mississippi 3	South Carolina 2	
April 3	Mississippi 4	South Carolina 1	
April 4	South Carolina 3	Mississippi 4	OT
Mississippi wins series 3–0

==== Semifinals ====
(1) Pee Dee vs. (8) New Orleans
Date	Away	Home
April 22	New Orleans 2	Pee Dee 5
April 23	New Orleans 3	Pee Dee 6
April 26	Pee Dee 0	New Orleans 6
April 27	Pee Dee 4	New Orleans 3
Pee Dee wins series 3–1

(3) Florida vs. (5) Mississippi
Date	Away	Home	
April 20	Mississippi 4	Florida 3	
April 22	Mississippi 5	Florida 4	OT
April 24	Florida 0	Mississippi 5	
Mississippi wins series 3–0

==== Finals ====
(1) Pee Dee vs. (5) Mississippi
Date	Away	Home	
May 1	Mississippi 1	Pee Dee 0	OT
May 2	Mississippi 3	Pee Dee 4	OT
May 5	Pee Dee 5	Mississippi 7	
May 7	Pee Dee 1	Mississippi 3	
May 8	Pee Dee 2	Mississippi 3	OT
Mississippi wins series 4–1

=== Kelly Cup finals ===
(S.5) Mississippi vs. (N.5) Richmond
Date	Away	Home	
May 15	Richmond 2	Mississippi 0	
May 16	Richmond 3	Mississippi 5	
May 19	Mississippi 3	Richmond 5	
May 23	Mississippi 0	Richmond 1	
May 24	Richmond 0	Mississippi 2	
May 28	Mississippi 7	Richmond 3	
May 30	Richmond 3	Mississippi 4	2 OT
Mississippi wins series 4–3

== ECHL awards ==
Patrick J. Kelly Cup:	Mississippi Sea Wolves
Henry Brabham Cup:	Pee Dee Pride
Northern Conference Champion:	Richmond Renegades
Southern Conference Champion:	Mississippi Sea Wolves
John Brophy Award:	Bob Ferguson (Florida)
ECHL Most Valuable Player:	Chris Valicevic (Louisiana)
Kelly Cup Playoffs Most Valuable Player:	Travis Scott (Mississippi)
ECHL Goaltender of the Year:	Maxime Gingras (Richmond)
ECHL Rookie of the Year:	Maxime Gingras (Richmond)
Defenseman of the Year:	Chris Valicevic (Louisiana)
Leading Scorer:	John Spoltore (Louisiana)
Sportsmanship Award:	Jamie Ling (Dayton)

== See also ==
- ECHL All-Star Game
- List of ECHL seasons
- 1998 in sports
- 1999 in sports
