= Kentucky Colonels (ABA 2000) =

Basketball team of the ABA 2000

Kentucky Colonels (ABA 2000) were a member of the ABA 2000, the second version of the American Basketball Association. The first American Basketball Association played from 1967 through the 1975–76 season and included a team called the Kentucky Colonels. Both versions of the Colonels played in Louisville, Kentucky.

Since the departure of the original Colonels in 1976, Louisville had hosted a handful of professional basketball teams including the Louisville Catbirds of the Continental Basketball Association in the 1980s and the Louisville Shooters of the United States Basketball League. Unsuccessful efforts were made to bring the NBA's relocating Charlotte Hornets and Vancouver Grizzlies to Louisville, along with the Houston Rockets at a time that they were demanding a new arena. Then, the ABA 2000 was formed and brought professional basketball back to Louisville.

In 2004, the New ABA brought back the Kentucky Colonels to Louisville during the 2004 season. The roster included such names as former Kentucky Wildcats Anthony Epps and Antwain Barbour, former University of Louisville standout Luke Whitehead and Syracuse University alum Jeremy McNeil. In the front office, former NBA veteran Tree Rollins was the general manager and all-time ABA great Lou Dampier was director of player personnel. Henry Bacon was initially named head coach, but after a 2–5 start to the season, he was replaced by assistant coach Kevin Keathley. Coach Keathley would guide the team to a 19−12 finish overall and a second round playoff loss to the eventual ABA champion Arkansas Rimrockers. Antwain Barbour was named All-ABA for the 2004–05 season and Coach Kevin Keathley was named an ABA Coach of the Year. The Colonels played three exhibition games in Ulaanbaatar, Mongolia in the summer of 2005. In 2006, the Colonels finished the season 2−14.

On January 4, 2007, the ABA announced that a team called the Kentucky Colonels was going to resume play in 2007–08, but they will be located in Murray, Kentucky. However, later the Murray team decided to change their name to the Kentucky Retros in deference to the tradition associated with the Colonels name.

== See also ==
- Sports in Louisville, Kentucky
