= List of professional sports teams in Kentucky =

Kentucky is the 26th most populated state in the United States and has a rich history of professional sports.

== Active teams ==
American football
League	Team	City	Arena	Capacity
UFL	Louisville Kings	Louisville	Lynn Family Stadium	11,700
Arena football
League	Team	City	Arena	Capacity
AF1	Kentucky Barrels	Highland Heights	Truist Arena	8,427
Baseball
League	Team	City	Stadium	Capacity
IL (AAA)	Louisville Bats	Louisville	Louisville Slugger Field	13,131
SAL (High-A)	Bowling Green Hot Rods	Bowling Green	Bowling Green Ballpark	4,559
ALPB (Ind.)	Lexington Legends	Lexington	Legends Field	9,994
FL (Ind.)	Florence Y'alls	Florence	Thomas More Stadium	4,500
Soccer
League	Team	City	Stadium	Capacity
USLC	Lexington SC	Lexington	Lexington SC Stadium	7,500
USLC	Louisville City FC	Louisville	Lynn Family Stadium	11,700
MLSNP	FC Cincinnati 2	Highland Heights	NKU Soccer Stadium	1,000
NWSL	Racing Louisville FC	Louisville	Lynn Family Stadium	11,700
USLS	Lexington SC	Lexington	Lexington SC Stadium	7,500

=== Map of cities with a professional sports team ===
Location with a professional sports team

== See also ==
- Sports in Kentucky
