= Birmingham Bulls (ECHL) =

Ice hockey team in Alabama, United States

- City: Birmingham, AL
- League: ECHL
- Founded: 1990
- Operated: 1992–2001
- Home arena: Birmingham–Jefferson Convention Complex

Franchise history
- 1990–1992: Cincinnati Cyclones
- 1992–2001: Birmingham Bulls
- 2001–2005: Atlantic City Boardwalk Bullies
- 2005–2015: Stockton Thunder
- 2015–present: Adirondack Thunder

Championships
- Regular season titles: none
- Division titles: none
- Conference titles: none
- Kelly Cups: none

The Birmingham Bulls were a minor professional ice hockey team in the East Coast Hockey League from 1992 to 2001. Their home arena was the Birmingham Jefferson Convention Center. The team moved to Atlantic City, New Jersey and was renamed the Atlantic City Boardwalk Bullies in 2001. After the 2005 season, the franchise was sold to a California investor group and became the Stockton Thunder, affiliated with the Edmonton Oilers of the NHL.

On February 20, 2017, former Bulls' owner Art Clarkson was approved by the Pelham City Council to bring another Bulls team back to play in the Southern Professional Hockey League (SPHL) for the 2017–18 season and were approved by the SPHL on April 25, 2017.

== History ==
In the early part of 1991, Art Clarkson flirted with the idea of bringing professional hockey back to Birmingham. Clarkson, who owned the Birmingham Barons, knew of the popularity of the Bulls from the World Hockey Association days. In the summer of 1992, the first Cincinnati Cyclones of the East Coast Hockey League relocated to Birmingham and were renamed the Bulls.

The New Jersey Devils were the Bulls' NHL affiliated club from 1992 to 1993. The Florida Panthers then became the Bulls NHL affiliate from 1993 to 1995. The St. Louis Blues were then the Bulls NHL affiliate from 1995-1996. Bruce Garber was the team's first coach. The Bulls finished 30–34, just missing the playoffs. After the inaugural season, Phil Roberto was named coach. He was familiar with Birmingham from his playing days with the earlier team. The club affiliated with the Florida Panthers. Roberto stayed with the team through the 1994–95 season. The Bulls made it through the second round of the playoffs each season. During the 1995–96 season, the Bulls changed coaches three times. Roberto was replaced by player-coach Jerome Bechard, and Dennis Desrosiers finished the season as head coach.

Prior to the 1997–98 season, Clarkson sold his interest in the team. Charles Felix became the primary owner. Dennis Desrosiers was let go after the 1999–2000 season. They lost 18 of their last 20. The Bulls were forced to forfeit games, due to using ineligible players. Following the 2000–01 season, dwindling attendance and poor performance, owner Charles Felix sold the team to NBA owner George Shinn of the Charlotte Hornets. He relocated the team to Atlantic City, NJ, naming them the Boardwalk Bullies. The team won the Kelly Cup in their third season. They franchise would eventually relocate again to Stockton, California in 2005 and then Glens Falls, New York in 2015.

== Playoffs ==
- 1992–93: Did not qualify.
- 1993–94: Defeated Huntsville 2–1 in first round; defeated Louisville 3–0 in quarterfinals; lost to Raleigh 3–1 in semifinals.
- 1994–95: Defeated Wheeling 3–0 in first round; lost to Tallahassee 3–1 in quarterfinals.
- 1995–96: Did not qualify.
- 1996–97: Defeated Mississippi 3–1 in first round; lost to Louisiana 3–2 in quarterfinals.
- 1997–98: Lost to South Carolina 3–1 in first round.
- 1998–99: Defeated Mobile 2–0 in first round; lost to Florida 3–0 in second round.
- 1999–00: Did not qualify.
- 2000–01: Did not qualify.
