= Sports in Louisville, Kentucky =

Sport in the United States

Sports in Louisville, Kentucky include amateur and professional sports in baseball, football, basketball, horse racing, horse shows, ice hockey, soccer and lacrosse. The city of Louisville and the Louisville metropolitan area have a sporting history from the mid-19th century to the present day.

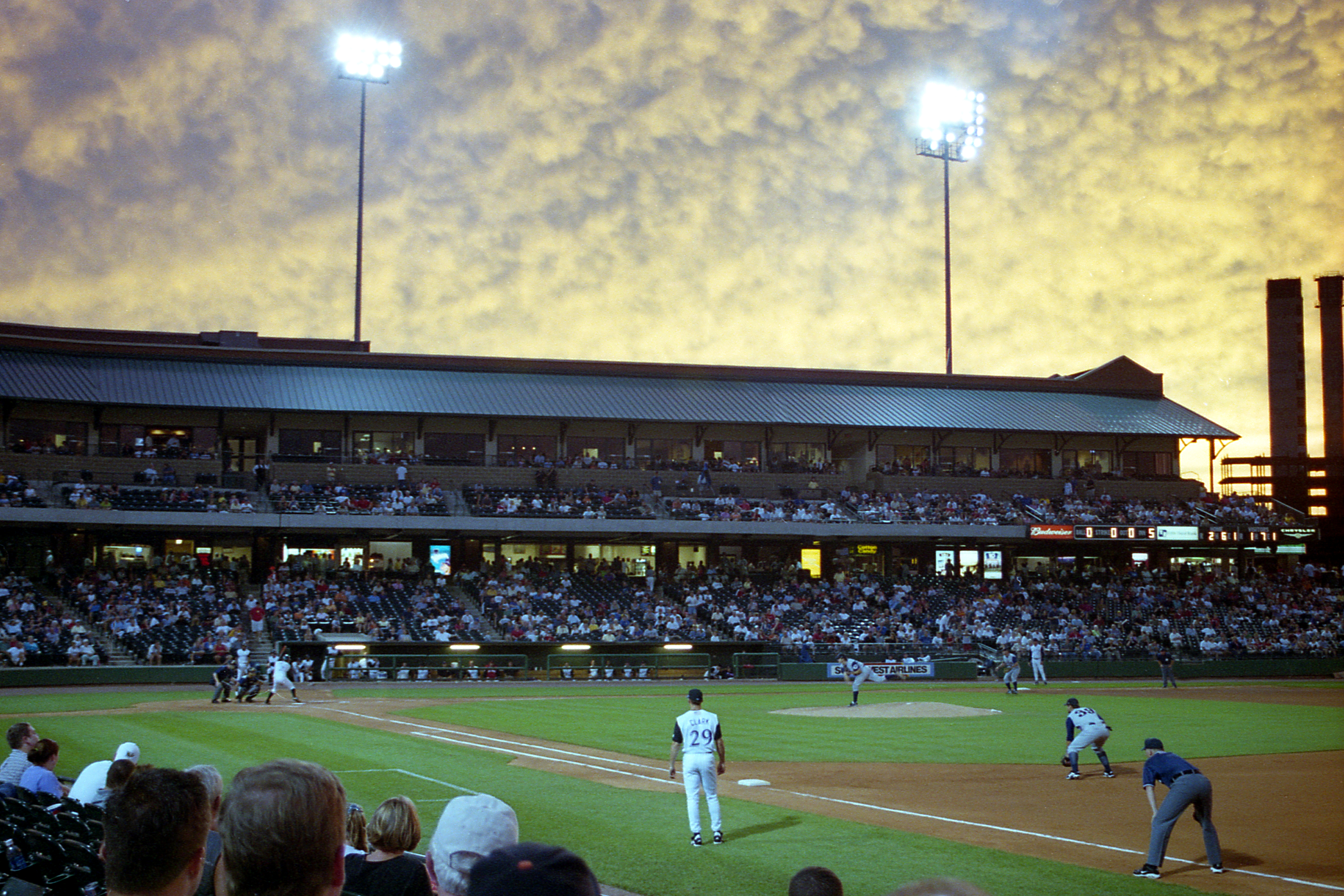
Louisville Slugger Field, where the Louisville Bats play

== Professional sports ==
Louisville is home to one major league professional women's team, and two minor league professional men's teams. The Louisville Bats are a baseball team playing in the International League as the Class AAA affiliate of the Cincinnati Reds. The team plays at Louisville Slugger Field at the edge of the city's downtown.

Louisville hosts two soccer teams. Louisville City FC began play in the United Soccer League in 2015, sharing Louisville Slugger Field with the Bats. Louisville City was the reserve side for Major League Soccer's Orlando City SC in 2015, but no longer fills that role after Orlando City launched a team-owned reserve side for the 2016 season.

In October 2019, the National Women's Soccer League announced that it would award an expansion franchise to Louisville that would begin play at Lynn Family Stadium in 2021.

In October 2025, the United Football League announced expansion to Louisville among other cities, with the Louisville Kings beginning play in 2026. The Kings won the 2026 United Bowl by a score of 27–20 to achieve their first title. The Kings became the first team in league history to win a title in its inaugural season.

Louisville is also the home of Valhalla Golf Club, which hosted the 1996, 2000, 2014, and 2024 PGA Championships, the 2004 Senior PGA Championship and the 2008 Ryder Cup.

Women's Major League Teams
Club	Sport	Began Play	League	Venue	Titles
Racing Louisville FC	Soccer	2021	National Women's Soccer League	Lynn Family Stadium	0

Minor League Professional Sports Teams
Club	Sport	Began Play	League	Venue	Titles
Louisville Bats	Baseball	1982	International League	Louisville Slugger Field	4
Louisville City FC	Soccer	2015	USL Championship	Lynn Family Stadium	2
Louisville Kings	Football	2026	United Football League	Lynn Family Stadium	1

== College sports ==
College basketball and college football are popular in Louisville, which prides itself on being one of the best college sports towns in America.

The city is home to the University of Louisville Cardinals, who compete in the NCAA's Division I and are a member of the Atlantic Coast Conference. The UofL men's basketball team won the NCAA Division I basketball championship in 1980 and 1986 under head coach Denny Crum, and recently achieved the NCAA Final Four in 2005, 2012, and 2013 under head coach Rick Pitino, and winning the National Championship in 2013 which would later be vacated. The women's basketball team, under head coach Jeff Walz, reached the final of the NCAA women's tournament in 2009 and 2013, losing both times to Connecticut. The 2008–09 team featured 2009 WNBA draft #1 pick Angel McCoughtry. Both basketball teams ended their tenure at Freedom Hall in 2010 and moved to the new KFC Yum! Center in downtown Louisville for the 2010–11 season.

The UofL football team, with coach Bobby Petrino, finished No. 7 in the nation for the 2006 season, 19th in the final BCS rankings of 2005 and 10th in 2004. After winning the Orange Bowl—the school's first Bowl Championship Series game—in January 2007, Petrino left the Cardinals to be the head coach of the Atlanta Falcons. Steve Kragthorpe was hired to replace Petrino less than two days later. Kragthorpe was fired after three years and replaced by University of Florida defensive coordinator Charlie Strong. Petrino returned for a second stint with the Cardinals in 2014, after Strong left for the head coaching vacancy at Texas. The UofL football team plays on campus at Cardinal Stadium. UofL won the Allstate Sugar Bowl in 2013, upsetting the Florida Gators.

The UofL baseball team advanced to the 2007 and 2013 College World Series in Omaha, where eight teams competed for the national championship. In 2012–13, UofL became the first school ever to appear in a BCS bowl game, the men's and women's Final Fours in basketball, and the College World Series in the same school year.

Bellarmine University, home of the Knights, moved all sports up to the NCAA Division I level in the 2019–2020 academic year. Spalding University, home of the Golden Eagles, plays in NCAA Division III as members of the St. Louis Intercollegiate Athletic Conference.

Louisville Universities
University	Nickname	League	Division
University of Louisville	Louisville Cardinals	Atlantic Coast Conference	NCAA Division I
Bellarmine University	Bellarmine Knights	ASUN Conference	NCAA Division I
Spalding University	Spalding Golden Eagles	St. Louis Intercollegiate Athletic Conference	NCAA Division III

== Horse racing and equestrian events ==
Churchill Downs is home to the Kentucky Derby, the largest sports event in the state, as well as the Kentucky Oaks, which together cap the two-week-long Kentucky Derby Festival. Churchill Downs has also hosted the renowned Breeders' Cup on eight occasions, in 2011, and most recently in 2018.

Besides racing there is the World's Championship Horse show. This show is mostly for Saddlebred horses and is held in conjunction with the Kentucky State Fair. This is the premier event of the year for Saddle seat Pleasure and Equitation.

== Professional wrestling ==
Louisville is the home of Ohio Valley Wrestling, a professional wrestling promotion that at different times served as the official developmental territory for WWE (2000–2008) and TNA Wrestling (2011–2013). Many notable WWE performers trained in OVW, such as Jillian Hall, Randy Orton, John Cena, Batista, CM Punk, and The Spirit Squad (which included the wrestler now known as Dolph Ziggler).

== High school ==
High school sports are also very popular in the city, especially football and basketball.

Louisville area high schools have been dominant in football in recent years. Trinity (1994, 2001–2003, 2005–2008, 2010–2013), Male (1993, 1998, 2000, 2015) and St. Xavier (1992, 1995, 1997, 1999, 2004, 2009) high schools have won 22 of the 24 football titles in Kentucky's largest enrollment class (4A through 2006, 6A since 2007) since 1992. Central has won five 3A titles since Kentucky's move to a six-class system (2007, 2008, 2010–2012). Manual also has a storied history, collecting 5 state titles (1925, 1938, 1948, 1959, 1966) and 2 national titles (1925 and 1938). Manual and Male are the oldest high schools in Louisville, and the 1st football game in the state was played between these two in 1893. Also, Trinity and St. Xavier have one of the fiercest rivalries in high school football. Every year, the Trinity-St. Xavier game draws an average of 35,000 fans to Cardinal Stadium, and is promoted by the schools as the largest attended regular-season high school football game in the country. Currently, St. Xavier leads this storied rivalry with 31 wins, 26 losses and 2 ties.

The 2002 Kentucky state 4A Football Championship between Male and Trinity, a showdown between future UofL teammates Brian Brohm (Trinity) and Michael Bush (Male) that ended with a 59–56 Trinity win, is listed as one of the top 50 sporting events of all time by many critics. The "Old Rivalry" between Male and Manual high schools is one of the nation's oldest, dating back to 1893, and was played on Thanksgiving Day through 1980, with Manual winning the final T-Day game by a score of 6–0 in overtime.

== Annual competitions ==
From 2007 to 2019, Louisville was host to the annual Ironman Louisville triathlon, in August until 2014 then in October afterwards. In 2019, 2,366 participants finished the course.

In early 2012, Louisville became the first American city to ever host the UCI Masters Cyclocross World Championships, and the following year became the first American city to host the Masters, Juniors, U23, and Professional Elite Women's and Men's UCI Cyclo-cross World Championships, the biggest races of the fastest growing form of bicycle racing. The event was held at a new permanent cyclocross course at Eva Bandman Park.

== Historical sports and teams ==
Louisville long ago hosted teams in the National Football League and Major League Baseball and fielded a strong franchise, the Kentucky Colonels, in the American Basketball Association before the ABA–NBA merger in June 1976. The Colonels won the penultimate ABA championship in 1975, defeating their archrival, the Indiana Pacers, in the 1975 ABA Finals.

The Kentucky Colonels were the winningest team in the history of the American Basketball Association, but the Colonels were not included in the ABA–NBA merger in June 1976. A later team with the same name played in Louisville in the ABA 2000 league but moved to Murray, Kentucky, in 2007 before folding. Louisville and the corporate community had also attempted to pursue the Vancouver Grizzlies franchise before their ultimate move to Memphis in 2001, as well as the Charlotte Hornets franchise, which ultimately moved to New Orleans in 2002 but was revived in 2004 as the Charlotte Bobcats, regaining the Hornets name and the team's pre-relocation history in 2014.

NASCAR-sanctioned stock car racing was held at the Louisville Motor Speedway, which hosted the Busch Series' Granger Select 200 in 1988 and 1989, the Truck Series' Kroger 225 from 1995 to 1999, and some ARCA races. The track was closed down and demolished shortly after Kentucky Speedway opened in Sparta.

Another soccer team, the Louisville Lightning, played indoor soccer in the Professional Arena Soccer League from 2009 to 2012 before folding. The city was home to two professional ice hockey teams in the East Coast Hockey League, from 1990 to 1994 the Louisville Icehawks, followed by the Louisville RiverFrogs from 1995 to 1998. The city also had an American Hockey League team from 1999 to 2001, the Louisville Panthers.

Club	Sport	Played	League	Venue
Louisville Grays	Baseball	1876–1878	National League	Various
Louisville Lacrosse Club	Lacrosse	1882–	United States Amateur Lacrosse Association	
Louisville Eclipse	Baseball	1882–1884	American Association	Eclipse Park
Louisville Colonels	Baseball	1884–1891	American Association	Various
Louisville African Americans	Baseball	1887	League of Colored Baseball Players	Various
Louisville Colonels	Baseball	1891–1899	National League	Eclipse Park
Louisville Colonels	Baseball	1901	Western Association	Various
Louisville Colonels	Baseball	1901–1962	American Association	Eclipse Park and Parkway Field
Louisville Brecks	Football	1921–1923	National Football League	Various
Louisville Colonels	Football	1926	National Football League	Various
Louisville Black Caps	Baseball	1930–1932	Negro National League, Negro Southern League	Parkway Field
Louisville Bourbons	Football	1931–1936	American Football League (1934)	
Louisville Tanks	Football	1935–1939	Midwest Football League, Midwest Professional Football League, American Professional Football League	Parkway Field
Louisville Colonels	Basketball	1947–1948	Professional Basketball League of America	unknown
Louisville Blades	Ice hockey	1948–1950	International Hockey League; United States Hockey League	Louisville Gardens
Louisville Buckeyes	Baseball	1949–1950	Negro leagues	Various
Louisville Alumnites	Basketball	1950–1951	National Professional Basketball League	Louisville Male High Gym
Louisville Shooting Stars	Ice hockey	1953–1954	International Hockey League	Louisville Gardens
Louisville Rebels	Ice hockey	1957–1960	International Hockey League	Louisville Gardens; Freedom Hall
Louisville Raiders	Football	1960–1962	United Football League	Cardinal Stadium
Kentucky Colonels	Basketball	1967–1976	American Basketball Association	Convention Center and Freedom Hall
Louisville Colonels	Baseball	1968–1972	International League	Cardinal Stadium
Kentucky Bourbons	Softball	1977–1982	American Professional Slow Pitch League, North American Softball League, United Professional Softball League	Bishop David Stadium
Kentucky Trackers	Football	1979–1980	American Football Association	Cardinal Stadium
Louisville Redbirds	Baseball	1982–1998	American Association	Cardinal Stadium
Louisville Catbirds	Basketball	1983–1985	Continental Basketball Association	Louisville Gardens
Louisville Thunder	Soccer	1984–1987	American Indoor Soccer Association	Broadbent Arena
Louisville Bulls	Football	1988–2011	Hearts of Ohio Football League, Mid-Continental Football League, Elite Mid-Continental Football League	Various
Louisville Icehawks	Ice hockey	1990–1995	East Coast Hockey League	Broadbent Arena
Louisville Shooters	Basketball	1991–1993	Global Basketball Association	Louisville Gardens
Louisville Thoroughbreds	Soccer	1994–1995	USISL / USISL Pro League	
Louisville RiverFrogs	Ice hockey	1995–1998	East Coast Hockey League	Broadbent Arena
Louisville RiverBats	Baseball	1998–2002	International League	Louisville Slugger Field
Louisville Panthers	Ice hockey	1999–2001	American Hockey League	Freedom Hall
Louisville Fire	Arena football	2001–2008	af2	Freedom Hall
Kentucky Colonels	Basketball	2004–2006	American Basketball Association	Louisville Gardens
Kentucky Retros	Basketball	2007	American Basketball Association	Freedom Hall
Louisville Lightning	Indoor soccer	2009–2012	PASL-Pro	Mockingbird Valley Soccer Club
Kentucky Stickhorses	Lacrosse	2012–2013	North American Lacrosse League	Freedom Hall
Kentucky Xtreme	Indoor football	2013	Continental Indoor Football League	Freedom Hall
Derby City Rovers	Soccer	2011–2018	Premier Development League	Centurion Soccer Fields, Woehrle Athletic Complex, and King Louie's Sports Complex

== See also ==
- Sports in Kentucky
