= 1997–98 ECHL season =

Ice hockey league season

The 1997–98 ECHL season was the tenth season of the ECHL. Before the start of the season, the league saw the Knoxville Cherokees move to Florence, SC and welcomed expansion teams in New Orleans, LA and Upper Marlboro, MD. The Louisiana IceGators finished the regular season first overall and the Hampton Roads Admirals won their record setting third overall ECHL championship (1st Kelly Cup), defeating the Pensacola Ice Pilots 4 games to 2.

== League realignment ==
With the league expanding to 25 teams, the Board of Governors decided to divide the league into two conference (Northern and Southern), with two divisions each. With the realignment the Board of Governors also created two new trophies, one each for the playoff champion of each conference.

=== Northern Conference ===
==== Northeast Division ====
- Chesapeake Icebreakers
- Hampton Roads Admirals
- Johnstown Chiefs
- Richmond Renegades
- Roanoke Express
- Wheeling Nailers

==== Northwest Division ====
- Columbus Chill
- Dayton Bombers
- Huntington Blizzard
- Louisville RiverFrogs
- Peoria Rivermen
- Toledo Storm

=== Southern Conference ===
==== Southeast Division ====
- Charlotte Checkers
- Jacksonville Lizard Kings
- Pee Dee Pride
- Raleigh Icecaps
- South Carolina Stingrays
- Tallahassee Tiger Sharks

==== Southwest Division ====
- Baton Rouge Kingfish
- Birmingham Bulls
- Louisiana IceGators
- Mississippi Sea Wolves
- Mobile Mysticks
- New Orleans Brass
- Pensacola Ice Pilots

== Regular season ==
=== Final standings ===
Note: GP = Games played; W = Wins; L= Losses; T = Ties; GF = Goals for; GA = Goals against; PTS = Points; Green shade = Clinched playoff spot; Blue shade = Clinched division; (z) = Clinched home-ice advantage

==== Northern Conference ====
Northeast Division	GP	W	L	T	PTS	GF	GA
Roanoke Express	70	42	21	7	91	235	208
Wheeling Nailers	70	37	24	9	83	255	255
Chesapeake Icebreakers	70	34	28	8	76	252	239
Hampton Roads Admirals	70	32	28	10	74	222	225
Richmond Renegades	70	30	33	7	67	218	277
Johnstown Chiefs	70	23	41	6	52	219	297

Northwest Division	GP	W	L	T	PTS	GF	GA
Peoria Rivermen	70	44	19	7	95	296	213
Toledo Storm	70	41	21	8	90	251	210
Dayton Bombers	70	36	26	8	80	255	256
Huntington Blizzard	70	34	29	7	75	230	259
Columbus Chill	70	33	30	7	73	221	220
Louisville RiverFrogs	70	32	31	7	71	228	257

==== Southern Conference ====
Southeast Division	GP	W	L	T	PTS	GF	GA
South Carolina Stingrays	70	41	23	6	88	246	218
Charlotte Checkers	70	35	24	11	81	251	237
Pee Dee Pride	70	34	25	11	79	214	215
Jacksonville Lizard Kings	70	35	29	6	76	243	239
Raleigh Icecaps	70	32	33	5	69	236	254
Tallahassee Tiger Sharks	70	24	44	2	50	210	320

Southwest Division	GP	W	L	T	PTS	GF	GA
Louisiana IceGators	70	43	17	10	96	298	232
Birmingham Bulls	70	39	23	8	86	293	257
Pensacola Ice Pilots	70	36	24	10	82	276	262
New Orleans Brass	70	36	24	10	82	278	263
Mobile Mysticks	70	35	27	8	78	236	233
Mississippi Sea Wolves	70	34	27	9	77	225	224
Baton Rouge Kingfish	70	33	27	10	76	220	238

== Kelly Cup playoffs ==
=== Bracket ===
Conference Quarterfinals (Best of 5)	Conference Semifinals (Best of 5)
1	Peoria	0
8	Hampton Roads	3
3	Toledo	1
4	Wheeling	3
4	Wheeling	3
5	Dayton	2
Northern Conference
3	Toledo	3
6	Chesapeake	0
2	Roanoke	2
8	Hampton Roads	3
2	Roanoke	3
7	Huntington	1
1	Louisiana	3
8	Mobile	0
1	Louisiana	3
7	Pee Dee	0
4	Pensacola	3
5	New Orleans	1
Southern Conference
3	Birmingham	1
6	Charlotte	3
4	Pensacola	3
6	Charlotte	0
2	South Carolina	2
7	Pee Dee	3

Conference Finals (Best of 7)
4	Wheeling	2
8	Hampton Roads	4
1	Louisiana	2
4	Pensacola	4

Kelly Cup Finals (Best of 7)
8	Hampton Roads	4
4	Pensacola	2

=== Northern Conference ===
==== Quarterfinals ====
(1) Peoria vs. (8) Hampton Roads
Date	Away	Home	
March 31	Hampton Roads 7	Peoria 3	
April 3	Peoria 0	Hampton Roads 2	
April 4	Peoria 3	Hampton Roads 4	OT
Hampton Roads wins series 3–0

(2) Roanoke vs. (7) Huntington
Date	Away	Home
March 31	Huntington 1	Roanoke 4
April 3	Roanoke 2	Huntington 3
April 4	Huntington 2	Roanoke 5
April 6	Roanoke 3	Huntington 2
Roanoke wins series 3–1

(3) Toledo vs. (6) Chesapeake
Date	Away	Home	
April 1	Chesapeake 2	Toledo 4	
April 3	Chesapeake 1	Toledo 4	
April 4	Toledo 3	Chesapeake 2	OT
Toledo wins series 3–0

(4) Wheeling vs. (5) Dayton
Date	Away	Home	
April 1	Dayton 1	Wheeling 4	
April 3	Dayton 2	Wheeling 1	
April 4	Wheeling 3	Dayton 4	OT
April 7	Wheeling 3	Dayton 2	OT
April 8	Dayton 2	Wheeling 4	
Wheeling wins series 3–2

==== Semifinals ====
(2) Roanoke vs. (8) Hampton Roads
Date	Away	Home	
April 9	Hampton Roads 0	Roanoke 3	
April 11	Hampton Roads 2	Roanoke 3	OT
April 15	Roanoke 3	Hampton Roads 4	
April 17	Roanoke 1	Hampton Roads 2	
April 20	Hampton Roads 3	Roanoke 2	OT
Hampton Roads wins series 3–2

(3) Toledo vs. (4) Wheeling
Date	Away	Home	
April 10	Wheeling 3	Toledo 0	
April 11	Wheeling 5	Toledo 6	
April 15	Toledo 2	Wheeling 3	OT
April 17	Toledo 0	Wheeling 3	
Wheeling wins series 3–1

==== Finals ====
(4) Wheeling vs. (8) Hampton Roads
Date	Away	Home	
April 22	Hampton Roads 4	Wheeling 3	OT
April 24	Hampton Roads 1	Wheeling 2	
April 25	Hampton Roads 3	Wheeling 4	OT
April 30	Wheeling 1	Hampton Roads 3	
May 2	Wheeling 1	Hampton Roads 2	OT
May 3	Wheeling 1	Hampton Roads 5	
Hampton Roads wins series 4–2

=== Southern Conference ===
==== Quarterfinals ====
(1) Louisiana vs. (8) Mobile
Date	Away	Home	
March 31	Mobile 2	Louisiana 4	
April 4	Louisiana 8	Mobile 7	OT
April 6	Mobile 4	Louisiana 6	
Louisiana wins series 3–0

(2) South Carolina vs. (7) Pee Dee
Date	Away	Home	
April 30	Pee Dee 6	South Carolina 3	
April 1	South Carolina 0	Pee Dee 3	
April 3	Pee Dee 1	South Carolina 5	
April 4	South Carolina 3	Pee Dee 0	
April 8	Pee Dee 4	South Carolina 3	OT
Pee Dee wins series 3–2

(3) Birmingham vs. (6) Charlotte
Date	Away	Home	
April 1	Charlotte 4	Birmingham 2	
April 2	Charlotte 3	Birmingham 4	
April 4	Birmingham 4	Charlotte 5	OT
April 5	Birmingham 2	Charlotte 5	
Charlotte wins series 3–1

(4) Pensacola vs. (5) New Orleans
Date	Away	Home	
April 2	New Orleans 2	Pensacola 3	
April 3	New Orleans 4	Pensacola 2	
April 4	Pensacola 6	New Orleans 5	OT
April 7	Pensacola 6	New Orleans 4	
Pensacola wins series 3–1

==== Semifinals ====
(1) Louisiana vs. (7) Pee Dee
Date	Away	Home
April 10	Pee Dee 3	Louisiana 6
April 11	Pee Dee 3	Louisiana 7
April 16	Louisiana 3	Pee Dee 0
Louisiana wins series 3–0

(4) Pensacola vs. (6) Charlotte
Date	Away	Home	
April 10	Charlotte 2	Pensacola 3	
April 11	Charlotte 3	Pensacola 4	OT
April 16	Pensacola 2	Charlotte 1	
Pensacola wins series 3–0

==== Finals ====
(1) Louisiana vs. (4) Pensacola
Date	Away	Home	
April 22	Pensacola 1	Louisiana 3	
April 25	Pensacola 1	Louisiana 3	
April 26	Louisiana 4	Pensacola 9	
April 28	Louisiana 4	Pensacola 6	
April 30	Pensacola 8	Louisiana 2	
May 3	Louisiana 4	Pensacola 5	OT
Pensacola wins series 4–2

=== Kelly Cup finals ===
Kelly Cup Finals (4) Pensacola vs. (8) Hampton Roads
Date	Away	Home	
May 8	Hampton Roads 4	Pensacola 7	
May 9	Hampton Roads 3	Pensacola 1	
May 12	Pensacola 1	Hampton Roads 0	OT
May 13	Pensacola 2	Hampton Roads 4	
May 18	Pensacola 3	Hampton Roads 7	
May 20	Hampton Roads 4	Pensacola 1	
Hampton Roads wins series 4–2

== ECHL awards ==
Patrick J. Kelly Cup:	Hampton Roads Admirals
Henry Brabham Cup:	Louisiana IceGators
Northern Conference Champion:	Hampton Roads Admirals
Southern Conference Champion:	Pensacola Ice Pilots
John Brophy Award:	Chris Nilan (Chesapeake)
ECHL Most Valuable Player:	Jamey Hicks (Birmingham)
Kelly Cup Playoffs Most Valuable Player:	Sebastien Charpentier (Hampton Roads)
ECHL Goaltender of the Year:	Nick Vitucci (Toledo)
ECHL Rookie of the Year:	Sean Venedam (Toledo)
Defenseman of the Year:	Chris Valicevic (Louisiana)
Leading Scorer:	Jamey Hicks (Birmingham)
Sportsmanship Award:	Cal Ingraham (Tallahassee)

== See also ==
- ECHL All-Star Game
- List of ECHL seasons
- 1997 in sports
- 1998 in sports
