= 1990–91 ECHL season =

Ice hockey league season

The 1990–91 ECHL season was the third season of the ECHL. In 1990, the league welcomed three new franchises: Cincinnati Cyclones, Louisville Icehawks, and Richmond Renegades. The Virginia Lancers franchise was renamed the Roanoke Valley Rebels. The eleven teams played 64 games in the schedule. The Knoxville Cherokees finished first overall in the regular season. The Hampton Roads Admirals won their first Riley Cup championship.

== Regular season ==
Note: GP = Games played, W = Wins, L = Losses, T = Ties, Pts = Points, GF = Goals for, GA = Goals against, Green shade = Clinched playoff spot, Blue shade = Clinched division

East Division	GP	W	L	OTL	Pts	GF	GA
Hampton Roads Admirals	64	38	20	6	82	300	248
Johnstown Chiefs	64	32	29	3	67	324	287
Erie Panthers	64	31	30	3	65	302	302
Richmond Renegades	64	29	29	6	64	300	307
Roanoke Valley Rebels	64	26	31	7	59	218	295

West Division	GP	W	L	OTL	Pts	GF	GA
Knoxville Cherokees	64	46	13	5	97	377	230
Cincinnati Cyclones	64	37	24	3	77	285	281
Greensboro Monarchs	64	34	27	3	71	275	268
Louisville Icehawks	64	31	29	4	66	251	309
Nashville Knights	64	29	31	4	62	307	317
Winston-Salem Thunderbirds	64	20	41	3	43	228	323

== Riley Cup playoffs ==
Divisional Semifinals; March 14–20
E1	Hampton Roads	3
E4	Richmond	1
E2	Johnstown	3
E3	Erie	2
W2	Cincinnati	1
W3	Greensboro	3
W4	Louisville	3
W1	Knoxville	0

Division Finals; March 22–29
E1	Hampton Roads	4
E2	Johnstown	1
W3	Greensboro	4
W4	Louisville	0

Riley Cup Finals; April 3–11
E1	Hampton Roads	4
W3	Greensboro	1

- E is short for East Division
- W is short for West Division

== ECHL awards ==
Jack Riley Cup:	Hampton Roads Admirals
Henry Brabham Cup:	Knoxville Cherokees
John Brophy Award:	Don Jackson (Knoxville)
ECHL Most Valuable Player:	Stan Drulia (Knoxville)
Riley Cup Playoffs Most Valuable Player:	Dave Flanagan / Dave Gagnon (Hampton Roads)
ECHL Rookie of the Year:	Dan Gauthier (Knoxville)
Defenseman of the Year:	Brett McDonald (Nashville)
Top Goaltender:	Dean Anderson (Knoxville)
Leading Scorer:	Stan Drulia (Knoxville)

== All-Star teams ==
The 1991 ECHL All-Star Team was announced on March 9, 1991. At this time, the ECHL did not hold an All-Star Game and would not hold their first such game until 1993.

=== First Team ===
Goalie:	Dean Anderson, Knoxville Cherokees
Defenseman:	Jeff Lindsay, Knoxville Cherokees
Defenseman:	Brett MacDonald, Nashville Knights
Left Wing:	Brian Martin, Hampton Roads Admirals
Center:	Dan Gauthier, Knoxville Cherokees
Right Wing:	Stan Drulia, Knoxville Cherokees

=== Second Team ===
Goalie:	Wayne Cowley, Cincinnati Cyclones
Defenseman:	Ryan Kummu, Erie Panthers
Defenseman:	Tom Searle, Richmond Renegades
Left Wing:	Troy Mick, Knoxville Cherokees
Center:	Murray Hood, Hampton Roads Admirals
Right Wing:	Sheldon Gorski, Louisville Icehawks

== See also ==
- ECHL All-Star Game
- Kelly Cup
- List of ECHL seasons
- 1990 in sports
- 1991 in sports
