= Louisville Panthers =

- City: Louisville, Kentucky
- League: American Hockey League
- Operated: 1999–2001
- Home arena: Freedom Hall
- Colors: Red, navy blue, gold
- Affiliates: Florida Panthers

Franchise history
- 1999–2001: Louisville Panthers
- 2005–2008: Iowa Stars
- 2008–2009: Iowa Chops
- 2009–present: Texas Stars

The Louisville Panthers were an ice hockey team in the American Hockey League. They played in Louisville, Kentucky. Their home venue was Freedom Hall at the Kentucky Exposition Center. The mascot was a light brown "panther" named Paws. They were affiliates of the Florida Panthers. The team became dormant following the 2000–01 season, until it was resurrected in 2005 as the Iowa Stars. Today, the franchise is known as the Texas Stars.

== Notable players ==
- Roberto Luongo
- Dan Boyle
- Rocky Thompson
- Eric Godard

== Career leaders ==
- Goals: 48 (Paul Brousseau, 1999–01)
- Assists: 63 (Paul Brousseau, 1999–01)
- Points: 111 (Paul Brousseau, 1999–01)
- PIM: 481 (Brent Thompson, 1999–01)

== Season-by-season results ==
Regular season

Season	Games	Won	Lost	Tied	OTL	Points	Goals for	Goals against	Standing
1999–00	80	42	30	7	1	92	278	254	4th, Mid-Atlantic
2000–01	80	21	51	5	3	50	200	285	4th, South

Playoffs

Season	1st round	2nd round	3rd round	Finals
1999–00	L, 1–3, Kentucky	—	—	—
2000–01	did not qualify.			

== See also ==
- Sports in Louisville, Kentucky
