= Louisville Catbirds =

- League: CBA 1983–1985
- Founded: 1983
- Folded: 1985
- History: Louisville Catbirds; 1983–1985; La Crosse Catbirds 1985–1994; Pittsburgh Piranhas 1994–1995
- Arena: Louisville Gardens (1983–84), Broadbent Arena (1985)
- Location: Louisville, Kentucky
- Team colors: orange, black, white, gray
- Head coach: Ron Ekker
- Championships: 0

The Louisville Catbirds were a basketball team of the U.S. Continental Basketball Association (CBA) who played in the mid-1980s.

== History ==
The Catbirds played two seasons in 1983–85 in Kentucky before moving to La Crosse, Wisconsin, in which the team would reach the CBA finals three times, winning twice (1990 and 1992). Head coach Flip Saunders led to the defeating Eric Musselman's Rapid City Thrillers team both times. Vincent Hamilton, Andre Turner, Tony White, Dwayne McClain, Carlos Clark, and Bill Martin helped the Catbirds achieve their franchise's first title in 1990. Two years later, Vincent Hamilton, David Rivers, Mark Davis, Kenny Battle, Derrick Gervin, and Brian Rahilly took La Crosse to a second championship. The team defected following the 1993–94 season.

== Team profile ==
=== Statistics ===
Season(s)	GP	W	L	Pct.	Name
1983–1985	48	19	29	.396	Louisville Catbirds

== Notable players ==
One of the notable Catbird players was Tom Payne, the first African-American basketball player at the University of Kentucky. A New York Times article told a story of this player: "Tom Payne, a 7-foot-1-inch former professional basketball player who spent 11 years in a Kentucky prison after a rape conviction, is scheduled to make his boxing debut at Los Angeles on June 14 in a four-round bout against Nick DeLong of Long Beach, Calif. After his parole late last year, he played with the Louisville Catbirds of the Continental Basketball Association.

Another Louisville Catbirds player was Wiley Brown, a player (and later assistant coach) at the University of Louisville who played tight end for the Philadelphia Eagles for two seasons.

Former University of Kentucky player Dirk Minniefield played for the Louisville Catbirds after being cut by the NBA's New Jersey Nets.

== See also ==
- Sports in Louisville, Kentucky

== Sources ==
- "Louisville Catbirds". History of Continental Basketball Association. Archived from the original on February 17, 2006.
- "Catbird's statistics". USBasket.com. Archived from the original on May 22, 2006.
- "SPORTS PEOPLE; 7-Foot-1-Inch Boxer". The New York Times. June 8, 1984.
