= Miami Matadors =

- City: Miami, Florida
- League: ECHL
- Division: Southeast
- Founded: 1995
- Operated: 1998–99
- Home arena: Miami Arena
- Colors: Black, gold, white
- Owners: Davis-Snyder Sports Management, Inc.
- General manager: Robert M. Snyder
- Head coach: Terry Christensen
- Captain: Wes Swinson
- Affiliates: Florida Panthers (NHL)

Franchise history
- 1995–98: Louisville RiverFrogs
- 1998–99: Miami Matadors
- 1999–2001: inactive
- 2001–present: Cincinnati Cyclones

The Miami Matadors were an ice hockey team in the East Coast Hockey League. They played in Miami, Florida, at the Miami Arena for one season before folding. The Matadors franchise would resurface two years later as the Cincinnati Cyclones.

== History ==
The franchise began as the Louisville RiverFrogs in 1995. Robert Snyder bought the team in February 1998 with intentions of moving the team to South Florida. Upon buying the team, he made the team a family business of sorts. His wife Michelle Dannin was named Vice President Of Communications, and his father Richard Snyder handled the team's legal matters. On May 12, 1998, Snyder signed a five-year agreement with Miami Arena that would allow the arena to host 35 games from October until April 4. Former Tallahassee Tiger Sharks head coach Terry Christensen became the team's first head coach on May 16, 1998. Prior to the start of the 1998–99 ECHL season, the Matadors affiliated with the NHL's Florida Panthers.

On October 16, 1998, the Matadors made their ECHL debut against the South Carolina Stingrays, Fans that attended the opening night game received a Miami Matadors cape. with an opening night crowd of 3,368 fans, and lost 5–2.

In their only season, the Matadors finished with a 28–32–10 record, finishing seventh in the ECHL's Southeast Division. The team's leading scorer was former Brown University center Michael Flynn, with 20 goals and 50 assists. Center Greg Clancy was the leading goal scorer with 28. Among other notable Matadors were veteran minor leaguer Sheldon Gorski and goaltender Brent Belecki.

=== Attendance ===
One of the Matadors' prime selling points were the inexpensive ticket prices. Snyder claimed a family of four could see a Matadors game for $50, compared to $223 to see the NBA's Miami Heat and $273 to see the Matadors' NHL affiliate, the Florida Panthers.

The team played in the 14,823-seat Miami Arena, whose capacity for Matadors games was cut to 6,351 by closing the upper bowl. Even with the reduced capacity, the Matadors never were able to sell out a single home game, averaging just 1,553 fans per contest, well short of the ECHL average attendance of about 4,800.

The attendance woes quickly took a financial hit on the team. When the Matadors could not afford the rent at the Arena, owner Robert Snyder moved the games to a local public skating rink. The lowest point was on March 3, 1999, when all tickets to a game against the Pee Dee Pride were given away for free, and only about eighty fans showed up to watch the game.

Finally, the last two games were moved out of the Miami market altogether and played in Estero, Florida, at Germain Arena, home of the ECHL rival Florida Everblades. Matadors season ticket holders were given free and additional tickets to the games there, though most chose not to make the two-hour drive.

=== Aftermath ===
After months of poor attendance and mounting debt in their inaugural season, the Matadors were folded in 1999. During the sale of the team, a lawsuit was filed by Robert Alterman accusing the team's general partners (Robert Snyder and Robert Davis) of fraud. Alterman, a limited partner who had a 20% ownership share of the team, accused both Snyder and Davis of selling the team for well below the value that was represented to Alterman. Davis and Snyder had listed the team as being for sale for $1.2 million. Alterman argued in his lawsuit that Davis and Snyder informed him that no team could be sold for less than $2 million.

The team was eventually sold to a Birmingham, Alabama, ownership group. Upon the folding of the IHL, the ownership relocated the Matadors' franchise and bought the rights to the Cincinnati Cyclones name that had been used since 1992. On July 16, 2001, it was confirmed that the new Cyclones franchise would start play as an ECHL team during the 2001–02 season.

== Transactions ==
- 05/19/98 - Matadors name Terry Christensen head coach.
- 10/21/98 - Matadors transfer defenseman Thom Cullen from the 10-day to the 14-day injured reserve; Matadors place forward Jan Jas on the 10-day injured reserve.
- 10/25/98 - Matadors sign defenseman Dennis Wood to PTO contract </ref> sun-sentinel.com/transactions.
- 11/05/98 - Matadors activate Thom Cullen from 14-day injured reserve
- 11/15/98 - Matadors suspend center/left wing Mike Sancimino
- 12/08/98 - Matadors trade defenseman Wes Swinson and forward Mike Sancimino to Tallahassee Tiger Sharks for the rights to forward Dan Lupo
- 12/12/98 - Matadors waive forward Kevin Powell
- 01/16/99 - Matadors suspend defenseman Kelly Hultgren
- 02/05/99 - Matadors sign defenseman Eon MacFarlane; Matadors place center Jon Finstrom on waivers
- 02/11/99 - Matadors place center Andrew Long on 10-day injured reserve.
- 03/10/99 - Matadors sign Jed Fiebelkorn
- 03/14/99 - Matadors activate John Badduke from injured reserve
- 03/24/99 - Matadors sign forward Jason Carriere
- 03/29/99 - Matadors sign forward Matt Redmond

== Notable personnel ==
- Reijo Ruotsalainen - Former defenseman who was a two-time Stanley Cup winner with the Edmonton Oilers prior to his arrival to the Matadors. Ruotsalainen was the Matadors' assistant coach.
- Wes Swinson - Former Hartford Whalers draft pick, Swinson was named the first captain in Matadors' history on October 16, 1998
- Brent Belecki - Starting goaltender of the Matadors. Belecki was named ECHL Rookie Of The Week once and Goaltender Of The Week on back to back weeks. Belecki had a 50 save victory in Miami's final home game.
- Terry Lindgren - Only player in Matadors' history to be named to the ECHL All-Star game.
- Lance Ward - former first round draft pick of the Florida Panthers, Ward would play 6 games with the Matadors. Ward would later go on to play over 200 games with the Panthers and the Mighty Ducks of Anaheim of the NHL.
