= Broadbent Arena =

Indoor arena in Louisville, Kentucky, U.S.

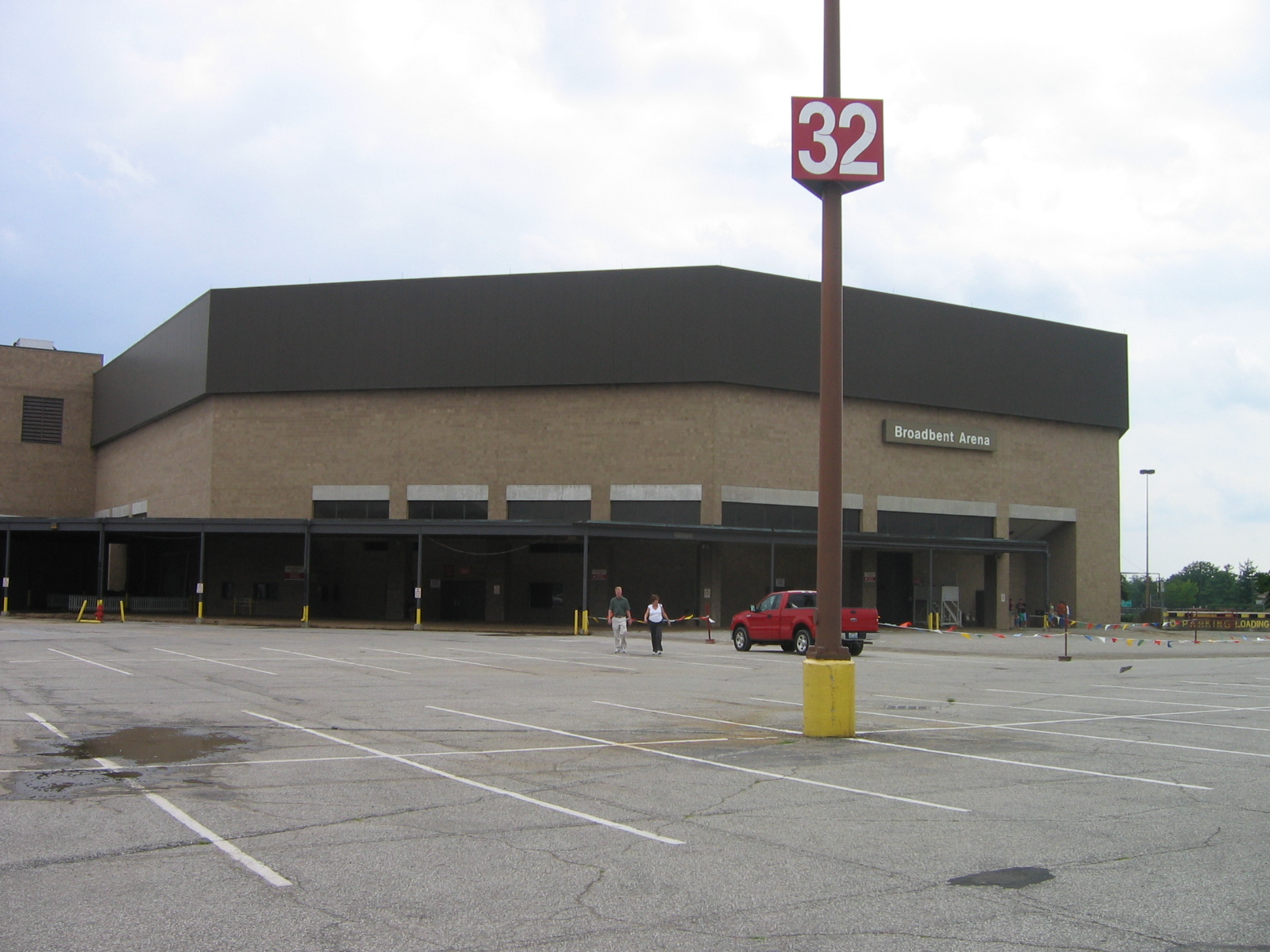
- Exterior, 2008
- Interactive map of Broadbent Arena
- Location: 937 Phillips Lane; Louisville, Kentucky
- Coordinates: 38°12′2″N 85°44′44″W
- Owner: Kentucky Exposition Center
- Capacity: 6,600

Tenants
- Louisville Catbirds (CBA) (1984–1985); Louisville Thunder (AISA) (1984–1987); Louisville Icehawks (ECHL) (1990–1994); Louisville RiverFrogs (ECHL) (1995–1998)

Website
- http://www.kyfairexpo.org

Broadbent Arena is a 6,600 seat multi-purpose arena in Louisville, Kentucky. It was home to the Louisville Icehawks and Louisville RiverFrogs ECHL teams. The arena, along with Cardinal Stadium and Freedom Hall, is located on the grounds of the Kentucky Exposition Center in Louisville. The arena is used for equestrian events, and other fairground type activities. In January 2021, the arena was used as a major distribution site for COVID-19 vaccines.

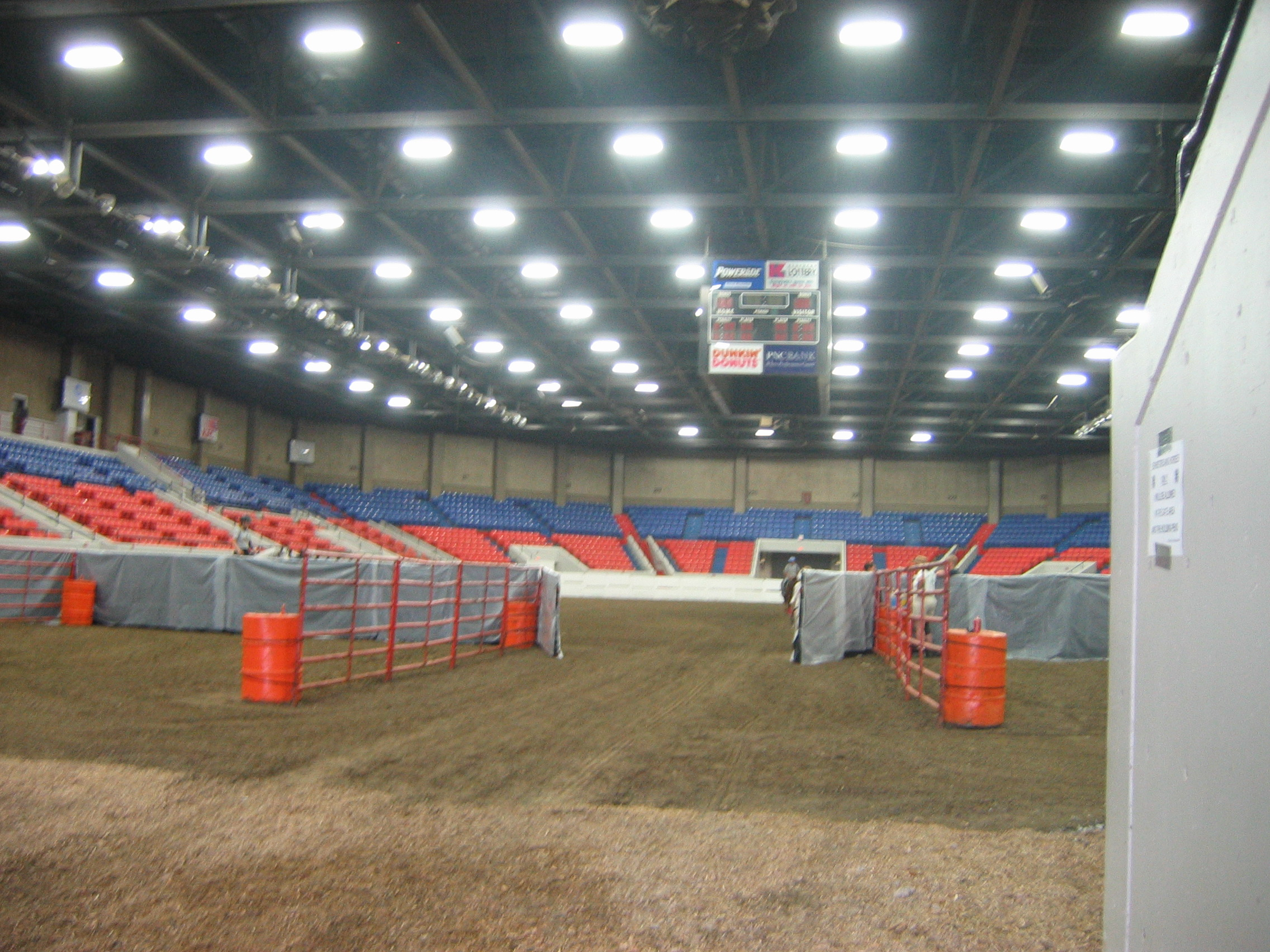
Interior 2008

== See also ==
- Sports in Louisville, Kentucky
