= Kentucky Retros =

- League: ABA 2007–08
- Founded: 2007
- Folded: 2008
- History: Kentucky Colonels; 2007; Kentucky Retros; 2007–08
- Location: Louisville, Kentucky
- Team colors: Red, white, blue, gold
- Head coach: Ron Greene
- Ownership: Steve Van Waes

The Kentucky Retros was a professional basketball team based in Louisville, Kentucky that was scheduled to begin play in the American Basketball Association (ABA) in 2007.

The team was originally located in Murray, Kentucky and named the Kentucky Colonels after the Louisville-based teams that had played in the ABA previously, but the name was changed in March 2007 in deference to the tradition of those teams. The original Kentucky Colonels were a part of the ABA from 1967 to 1976. On July 17, 1976, owner of the Colonels, John Y. Brown Jr., agreed to a deal worth $3,000,000 that saw the end of the team just ahead of the 1976 ABA–NBA merger.

Unlike their predecessors, the Retros did not stay around for a complete season. The team folded during the 2007–08 season.

== 2007–08 season ==
Before the team was set to play in the 2007-08 ABA season, they played in basketball tournaments all around the United States.

In June 2007, the team was set to participate in the 2007 Hoops Kentucky Pro Am. There is no record available to know how the team fared in the tournament.

== Notable players ==
- Marco Killingsworth - played college basketball 2001–2006; played for Auburn University in his freshman through junior seasons; after the 2004 season, transferred to Indiana University, where he averaged 17.1 points per game.

== Logo ==
The Retros' logo was designed by graphic design student DeWayne Esson while he was still a student at Murray State University. The colors were derived from those of the original Kentucky Colonels.

== See also ==
- Sports in Louisville, Kentucky
