= Pee Dee Pride =

Defunct minor-league professional hockey team

- City: Florence, South Carolina
- League: ECHL
- Founded: 1997
- Home arena: Florence Civic Center

Championships
- Regular season titles: 1998–99
- Division titles: 1998–99

The Pee Dee Pride, known as the Florence Pride for the 2003–04 ECHL season, were a professional minor-league hockey team that was based in Florence, South Carolina, where they played in the East Coast Hockey League (ECHL) from 1997 until 2005. The team came to Florence as a relocation of the Knoxville Cherokees, one of the five charter members of the ECHL which was originally housed in Knoxville, Tennessee.

The Pride played at the Florence Civic Center, which seats 7,426 fans. The name of the organization came from the Pee Dee region of South Carolina in which Florence is located. The team's mascot was Paws the Lion. The organization never won the Kelly Cup, the ECHL championship trophy. However, the Pride were previous winners of the Palmetto Cup for best team in South Carolina, and the Brabham Cup for best regular season record. In-state rivals of the Pride included the South Carolina Stingrays, the Greenville Grrrowl, and the Columbia Inferno.

After the 2004–05 season, the team moved to Myrtle Beach as the Myrtle Beach Thunderboltz. However, construction on a planned 7,000-seat arena on the campus of Coastal Carolina University stalled. Finally, at the ECHL league meetings in June 2009, the franchise was returned to the league, ending its lineage.

== Playoffs ==
- 1997–98: Defeated South Carolina 3–2 in first round; lost to Louisiana 3–0 in quarterfinals.
- 1998–99: Defeated Baton Rouge 3–1 in first round; defeated New Orleans 3–1 in quarterfinals; lost to Mississippi 4–1 in semifinals.
- 1999–00: Lost to South Carolina 3–2 in first round.
- 2000–01: Defeated Florida 3–2 in first round; lost to Louisiana 3–2 in quarterfinals.
- 2001–02: Defeated Columbia 3–2 in first round; lost to Greenville 3–1 in quarterfinals.
- 2002–03: Defeated South Carolina 3–1 in first round; lost to Columbia 3–0 in quarterfinals.
- 2003–04: Did not qualify.
- 2004–05: Did not qualify.
