= Chesapeake Icebreakers =

- City: Upper Marlboro, Maryland
- League: East Coast Hockey League
- Founded: 1997
- Operated: 1997–1999
- Home arena: The Show Place Arena

Franchise history
- 1997–1999: Chesapeake Icebreakers
- 1999–2003: Jackson Bandits

The Chesapeake Icebreakers were a minor league ice hockey team that played in the East Coast Hockey League (ECHL) from 1997 to 1999. The Icebreakers were an expansion team that was granted to Upper Marlboro, Maryland for the start of the 1997–98 ECHL season. They were coached by noted NHL enforcer Chris Nilan for both of their seasons.

The Icebreakers 34-28-8 record was good for 76 points and third place in the Northeast Division, 15 points behind the division leading Roanoke Express. Seeded 6th in the playoffs and matched up against the #3 ranked Toledo Storm, they would be swept three games to none. Chris Nilan would win the John Brophy Award as the league's top coach. Derek Clancey would lead the team in assists with 77, and in points with 105. John Cardwell would score 40 goals while Brad Domonsky led the team with 244 penalty minutes. Mike Tamburro played 25 games in net, and managed a 16-6-1 record with a 2.68 GAA and two shutouts. The team drew an average of 2,650 fans, third-worst in the league.

For their second season, they improved their point total by three points. Their record was 34-25-11, however they would drop to fourth place in the tough Northeast Division. Seeded 7th, they played the 2nd-seeded Columbus Chill (who won the Northwest Division) in the first round of the playoffs. Their first playoff win in team history took place on April 8, which evened the series at one game apiece. They defeated the Chill 3–2 in overtime of Game 4 to take the series 3–1. Their next opponents were the top ranked Roanoke Express, who took the series against the Icebreakers in four games. The final game in franchise history was played April 24, 1999. Derek Clancey had another season finishing with a team high of 79 points, while Denny Felsner paced the team with 29 goals. L.P Charbonneau had 271 PIM. Mike Tamburro finished with a 19-11-2 record with a 2.45 GAA average. Attendance would slip to 2,347 fans, once again third-worst.

Home games were played at a converted equestrian facility known as The Show Place Arena in Upper Marlboro, Maryland. Despite occasional sellouts and a playoff run, the franchise was plagued by a severe lack of publicity in the community and a near total lack of coverage by area newspapers. The team moved to become the Jackson Bandits after their second season.
