= Louisville Icehawks =

Defunct professional ice hockey team

- City: Louisville, Kentucky
- League: ECHL
- Division: Southern Division
- Founded: 1990
- Operated: 1990–1994
- Home arena: Broadbent Arena (6,600)

The Louisville Icehawks were a professional ice hockey team competing in the East Coast Hockey League. The team, based in Louisville, Kentucky, played from 1990 to 1994. Their home venue was Broadbent Arena at the Kentucky Exposition Center. The mascot was called Tommy Hawk, a play on tomahawk, and resembled The San Diego Chicken, but with coloration and costume matching the team's. Tommy Hawk was "banned" from the inside portion of the arena for a period of time, due to an altercation with a visiting player who was in the penalty box. In the 1995–96 season, the team was renamed and moved to Florida to become the Jacksonville Lizard Kings.

For a period of time the Louisville Icehawks' parent team/NHL Affiliate were the Pittsburgh Penguins.

Trevor Buchanan was a player for the Icehawks that spent a great deal of time in the penalty box, thus spawning his own fan club.

== Playoffs ==
- 1990–91: Defeated Knoxville 3–0 in quarterfinals; lost to Greensboro 4–0 in semifinals.
- 1991–92: Defeated Toledo 4–1 in first round; received quarterfinals bye; defeated Cincinnati 3–1 in semifinals; lost to Hampton Roads 4–0 in finals.
- 1992–93: Did not qualify.
- 1993–94: Defeated Knoxville 2–1 in first round; lost to Birmingham 3–0 in quarterfinals.
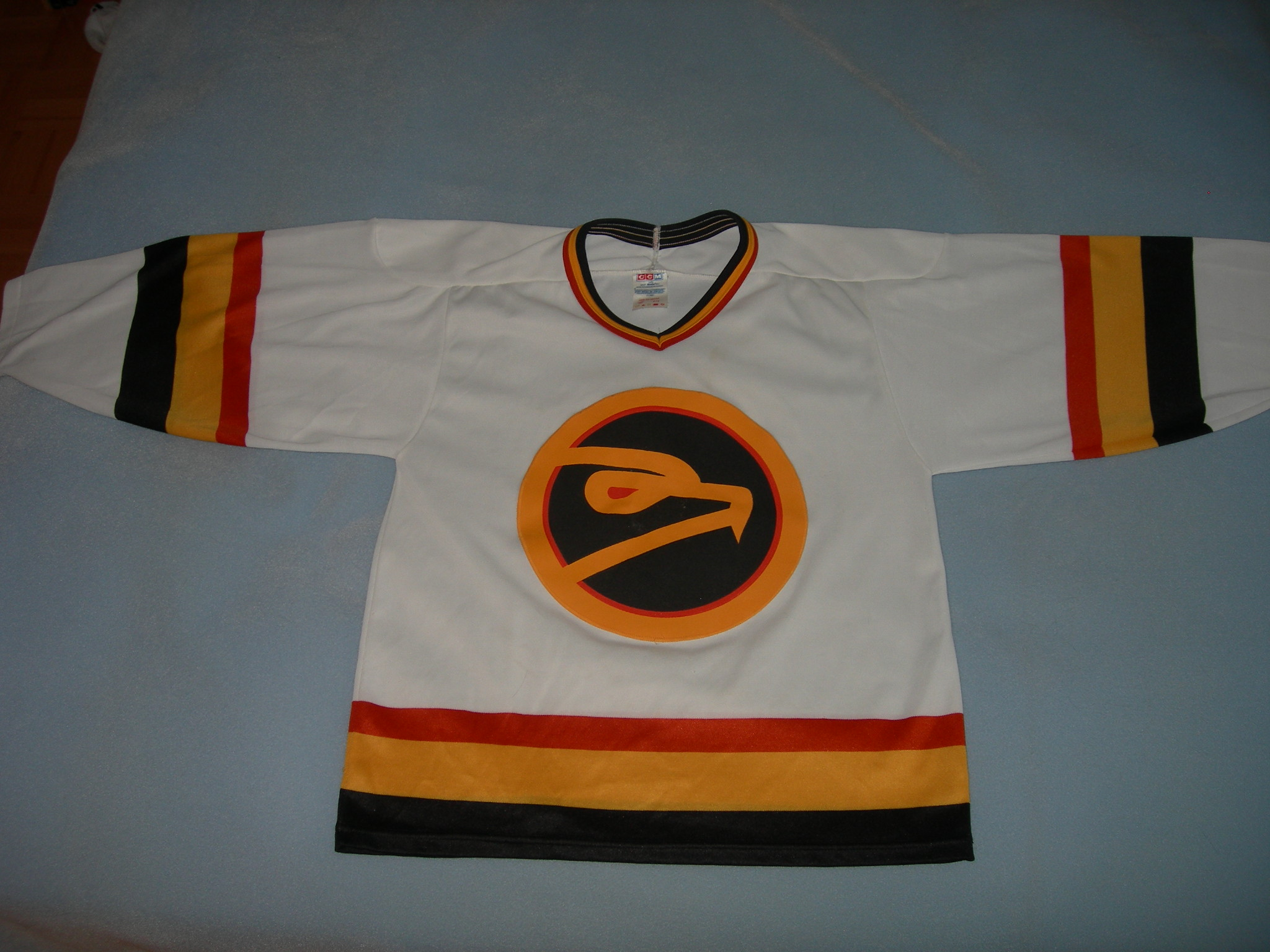
Icehawks replica jersey

== See also ==
- Sports in Louisville, Kentucky
