= Louisville RiverFrogs =

- City: Louisville, Kentucky
- League: ECHL
- Division: Southeast
- Founded: 1995
- Operated: 1995–1998
- Home arena: Broadbent Arena
- Affiliates: San Jose Sharks; New York Islanders (NHL)

Franchise history
- 1995–98: Louisville RiverFrogs
- 1998–99: Miami Matadors
- 1999–2001: inactive
- 2001–present: Cincinnati Cyclones

The Louisville RiverFrogs were a professional ice hockey team competing in the East Coast Hockey League (ECHL), which was a mid-level professional American hockey league with teams from all over the United States as well as one franchise from Canada. The team was based in Louisville, Kentucky and played from 1995 to 1998. Their home venue was Broadbent Arena (nicknamed "The Swamp" for their duration; capacity 6,600) at the Kentucky Exposition Center.

At the conclusion of the 1997–1998 season, the franchise was sold and moved to Florida to become the Miami Matadors for a year before moving to Ohio as the Cincinnati Cyclones in 2001. The Cyclones are still currently playing in the ECHL. They started out playing their games in Cincinnati Gardens, but they now play at the Heritage Bank Center. The Cyclones are also the minor league affiliate to the Rochester Americans of the American Hockey League (AHL), as well as the Buffalo Sabres of the National Hockey League (NHL).

The team's mascot was Rowdy River Frog. The RiverFrogs games were locally known for the amount of non-hockey-related entertainment at shows, including a giant frog blimp, hot tubs, and concession booths.

== See also ==
- Sports in Louisville, Kentucky
