= Jacksonville Lizard Kings =

Defunct minor professional ice hockey team

- City: Jacksonville, Florida
- League: ECHL
- Conference: American Conference
- Division: Southeast Division
- Founded: 1995
- Folded: 2000
- Home arena: Jacksonville Coliseum
- Colors: Black, Green, Purple
- Affiliates: Chicago Blackhawks (NHL)

Franchise history
- 1990–1994: Louisville Icehawks
- 1995–2000: Jacksonville Lizard Kings

Championships
- Regular season titles: None
- Division titles: None
- Kelly Cups: None (Runner up, 1995)

The Jacksonville Lizard Kings were a professional ice hockey team based in Jacksonville, Florida. Formerly known as the Louisville Icehawks, they played in the East Coast Hockey League (ECHL) from 1995–2000. They played their home games in the Jacksonville Coliseum.

== History ==
The Lizard Kings began play in the East Coast Hockey League as the Louisville Icehawks, based in Louisville, Kentucky. They played in Louisville from 1990 until 1994, but suspended operations after the 1993–94 season, and the organization decided to relocate to Jacksonville, Florida.

The team, now rebranded as the Jacksonville Lizard Kings, promoted themselves in their new city with a substantial marketing campaign, including television ads featuring a goalie catching a puck with a lizard tongue. They faced some competition from another local hockey team, the Jacksonville Bullets, but were able to secure a lease to the Jacksonville Coliseum, and became Jacksonville's only professional hockey team when the Bullets folded in 1996. Despite their advertising the Lizard Kings were not able to cover their operating costs, and lost $2.2 million over four years. The management determined they would not be viable in the aging Jacksonville Coliseum, and decided to suspend operations in 2000 in anticipation of the construction of the new Jacksonville Veterans Memorial Arena. The team eventually ceased operations.

In 2002 a new team, the Jacksonville Barracudas, began play in the Coliseum and secured a contract for the new arena, completed in 2003.
