= Notre Dame Fighting Irish men's ice hockey statistical leaders =

The Notre Dame Fighting Irish men's ice hockey statistical leaders are individual statistical leaders of the Notre Dame Fighting Irish men's ice hockey program in various categories, including goals, assists, points, and saves. Within those areas, the lists identify single-game, single-season, and career leaders. The Fighting Irish represent the University of Notre Dame in the NCAA's Big Ten.

Notre Dame began competing in intercollegiate ice hockey in 1911. These lists are updated through the end of the 2020–21 season.

== Goals ==
Career
Rk	Player	Goals	Seasons
1	Greg Meredith	104	1976–77 1977–78 1978–79 1979–80
2	Eddie Bumbacco	103	1970–71 1971–72 1972–73 1973–74
3	Ian Williams	92	1970–71 1971–72 1972–73 1973–74
4	Brent Chapman	90	1981–82 1982–83 1983–84 1984–85 1985–86
5	Paul Regan	89	1969–70 1970–71 1971–72 1972–73
	Brian Walsh	89	1973–74 1974–75 1975–76 1976–77
	Dave Poulin	89	1978–79 1979–80 1980–81 1981–82
8	Mike McNeill	83	1984–85 1985–86 1986–87 1987–88
9	John Noble	81	1969–70 1970–71 1971–72 1972–73
10	Kirt Bjork	76	1979–80 1980–81 1981–82 1982–83

Season
Rk	Player	Goals	Season
1	Eddie Bumbacco	43	1972–73
2	Greg Meredith	40	1979–80
3	Brent Chapman	36	1984–85
4	Ian Williams	34	1972–73
5	Phil Wittliff	31	1968–69
6	Paul Regan	30	1971–72
	Brian Walsh	30	1976–77
8	Phil Wittliff	29	1969–70
	Dave Poulin	29	1981–82
	Kirt Bjork	29	1982–83

Single Game
Rk	Player	Goals	Season	Opponent
1	Phil Wittliff	5	1969–70	Purdue
	Ian Williams	5	1971–72	Dartmouth
	Mike McNeill	5	1987–88	Army

== Assists ==
Career
Rk	Player	Assists	Seasons
1	John Noble	145	1969–70 1970–71 1971–72 1972–73
	Brian Walsh	145	1973–74 1974–75 1975–76 1976–77
3	Ian Williams	119	1970–71 1971–72 1972–73 1973–74
4	Eddie Bumbacco	117	1970–71 1971–72 1972–73 1973–74
5	Mike McNeill	115	1984–85 1985–86 1986–87 1987–88
6	Clark Hamilton	113	1973–74 1974–75 1975–76 1976–77
7	Erik Condra	110	2005–06 2006–07 2007–08 2008–09
8	David Bankoske	109	1988–89 1989–90 1990–91 1991–92 1992–93
9	Dave Poulin	107	1978–79 1979–80 1980–81 1981–82
	T. J. Tynan	107	2010–11 2011–12 2012–13 2013–14

Season
Rk	Player	Assists	Season
1	Eddie Bumbacco	47	1972–73
	Brian Walsh	47	1975–76
	Brian Walsh	47	1976–77
4	Tom Michalek	44	1979–80
	Mike McNeill	44	1987–88
6	John Noble	42	1971–72
7	John Noble	41	1972–73
8	Tim Reilly	39	1984–85
9	Clark Hamilton	38	1975–76
	Curtis Janicke	38	1991–92

Single Game
Rk	Player	Assists	Season	Opponent
1	Steve Curry	5	1973–74	Michigan State
	Jack Brownschidle	5	1976–77	Michigan State
	Tom Michalek	5	1978–79	Colorado College
	Brent Chapman	5	1985–86	Colgate
	Jamie Ling	5	1994–95	Waterloo

== Points ==
Career
Rk	Player	Points	Seasons
1	Brian Walsh	234	1973–74 1974–75 1975–76 1976–77
2	John Noble	226	1969–70 1970–71 1971–72 1972–73
3	Eddie Bumbacco	220	1970–71 1971–72 1972–73 1973–74
4	Ian Williams	211	1970–71 1971–72 1972–73 1973–74
5	Mike McNeill	198	1984–85 1985–86 1986–87 1987–88
6	Dave Poulin	196	1978–79 1979–80 1980–81 1981–82
7	Greg Meredith	192	1976–77 1977–78 1978–79 1979–80
8	Paul Regan	186	1969–70 1970–71 1971–72 1972–73
9	Clark Hamilton	183	1973–74 1974–75 1975–76 1976–77
10	David Bankoske	182	1988–89 1989–90 1990–91 1991–92 1992–93

Season
Rk	Player	Points	Season
1	Eddie Bumbacco	90	1972–73
2	Brian Walsh	77	1976–77
3	Mike McNeill	72	1987–88
4	Greg Meredith	71	1979–80
5	Ian Williams	69	1972–73
6	Brian Walsh	65	1975–76
7	John Noble	63	1972–73
	Kirt Bjork	63	1982–83
	Brent Chapman	63	1984–85
10	John Noble	61	1971–72
	Tim Reilly	61	1984–85

Single Game
Rk	Player	Points	Season	Opponent
1	Phil Wittliff	7	1968–69	Illinois
	Jamie Ling	7	1994–95	Waterloo

== Saves ==
Career
Rk	Player	Saves	Seasons
1	Lance Madson	3,519	1986–87 1987–88 1988–89 1989–90
2	Morgan Cey	3,146	2001–02 2002–03 2003–04 2004–05
3	Cale Morris	3,081	2016–17 2017–18 2018–19 2019–20
4	Cal Petersen	3,042	2014–15 2015–16 2016–17
5	Ryan Bischel	2,998	2019–20 2020–21 2021–22 2022–23 2023–24
6	Matt Eisler	2,892	1994–95 1995–96 1996–97 1997–98
7	Dick Tomasoni	2,756	1968–69 1969–70 1970–71 1971–72
8	Len Moher	2,730	1974–75 1975–76 1976–77 1977–78
9	David Brown	2,662	2003–04 2004–05 2005–06 2006–07
10	Dave Laurion	2,600	1978–79 1979–80 1980–81 1981–82

Season
Rk	Player	Saves	Season
1	Lance Madson	1,288	1988–89
2	Ryan Bischel	1,183	2022–23
3	Cale Morris	1,169	2017–18
4	Mark Kronholm	1,113	1973–74
5	Ryan Bischel	1,112	2023–24
6	Cal Petersen	1,101	2016–17
7	Morgan Cey	1,054	2002–03
8	Cal Petersen	1,049	2015–16
9	Cale Morris	1,011	2018–19
10	Mark Kronholm	980	1972–73
	Nick Kempf	980	2025–26

Single Game
Rk	Player	Saves	Season	Opponent
1	Cal Petersen	87	2014–15	Massachusetts
