= Anders Bjork (ice hockey) =

American ice hockey player (born 1996)

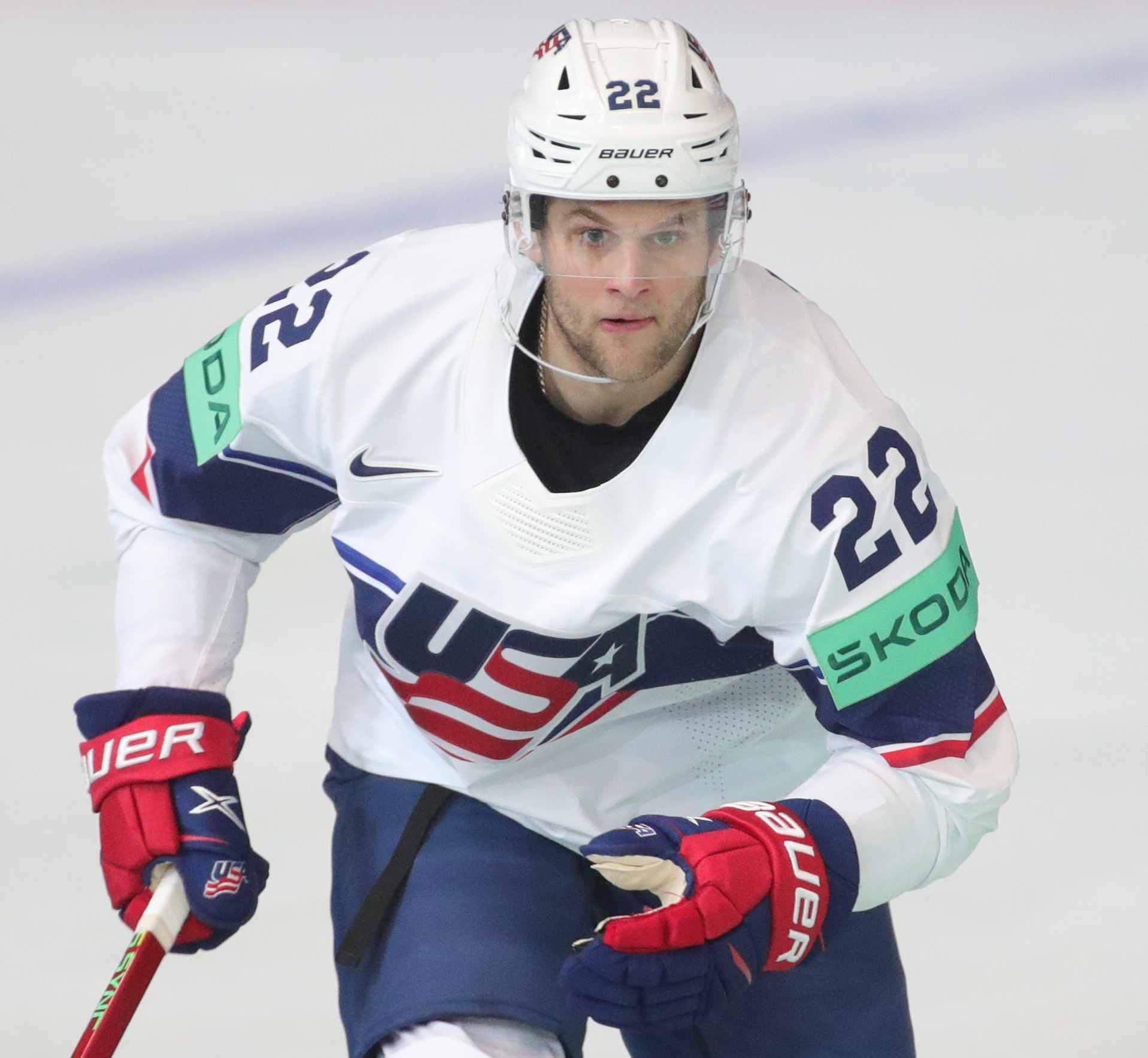
- Bjork with Team USA in 2023
- Born: August 5, 1996 (age 30) Mequon, Wisconsin, U.S.
- Height: 6 ft 0 in (183 cm)
- Weight: 190 lb (86 kg; 13 st 8 lb)
- Position: Left wing
- Shoots: Left
- team Former teams: Free agent Boston Bruins; Buffalo Sabres; Chicago Blackhawks
- National team: United States
- NHL draft: 146th overall, 2014; Boston Bruins
- Playing career: 2017–present

Anderson Patrick Bjork (born August 5, 1996) is an American professional ice hockey left winger who is currently an unrestricted free agent. He most recently played for the Milwaukee Admirals of the American Hockey League (AHL). Bjork was selected 146th overall by the Boston Bruins in the 2014 NHL entry draft.

== Playing career ==
=== Collegiate ===
Bjork played college hockey at Notre Dame in the Hockey East from 2014 to 2017. In 2016–17, Bjork was a finalist for the Hobey Baker Award, marking him as one of the ten best players in men's college hockey; he was also named a Hockey East First-Team All-Star, and was a co-winner of the Hockey East Three-Stars Award.

=== Professional ===
==== Boston Bruins ====
At the completion of his junior season with the Fighting Irish, Bjork concluded his collegiate career in signing a three-year, entry-level contract with the Boston Bruins on May 30, 2017.

Bjork's NHL career started with the 2017–18 Bruins season opener, a 4–3 home ice victory over the Nashville Predators, when he scored an assist on fellow Bruins rookie Jake DeBrusk's first-ever NHL goal, for his first point as an NHL player. Bjork's first NHL goal came in the fourth game of the season on the road against the Arizona Coyotes, as the final goal of a 6–2 road win for the Bruins.

On January 30, 2018, during a home-ice game against the visiting Anaheim Ducks, Bjork suffered a season-ending left shoulder injury – he underwent a successful arthroscopy and labral repair three weeks later, and was expected to take six months to fully heal from the surgical repair.

==== Buffalo Sabres ====
In the pandemic delayed 2020–21 season, Bjork collected 2 goals and 5 points through 30 regular season games before he was dealt by the Bruins on the eve of the trade deadline along with a 2021 second-round draft pick to the Buffalo Sabres in exchange for Taylor Hall and Curtis Lazar on April 11, 2021.

==== Chicago Blackhawks ====
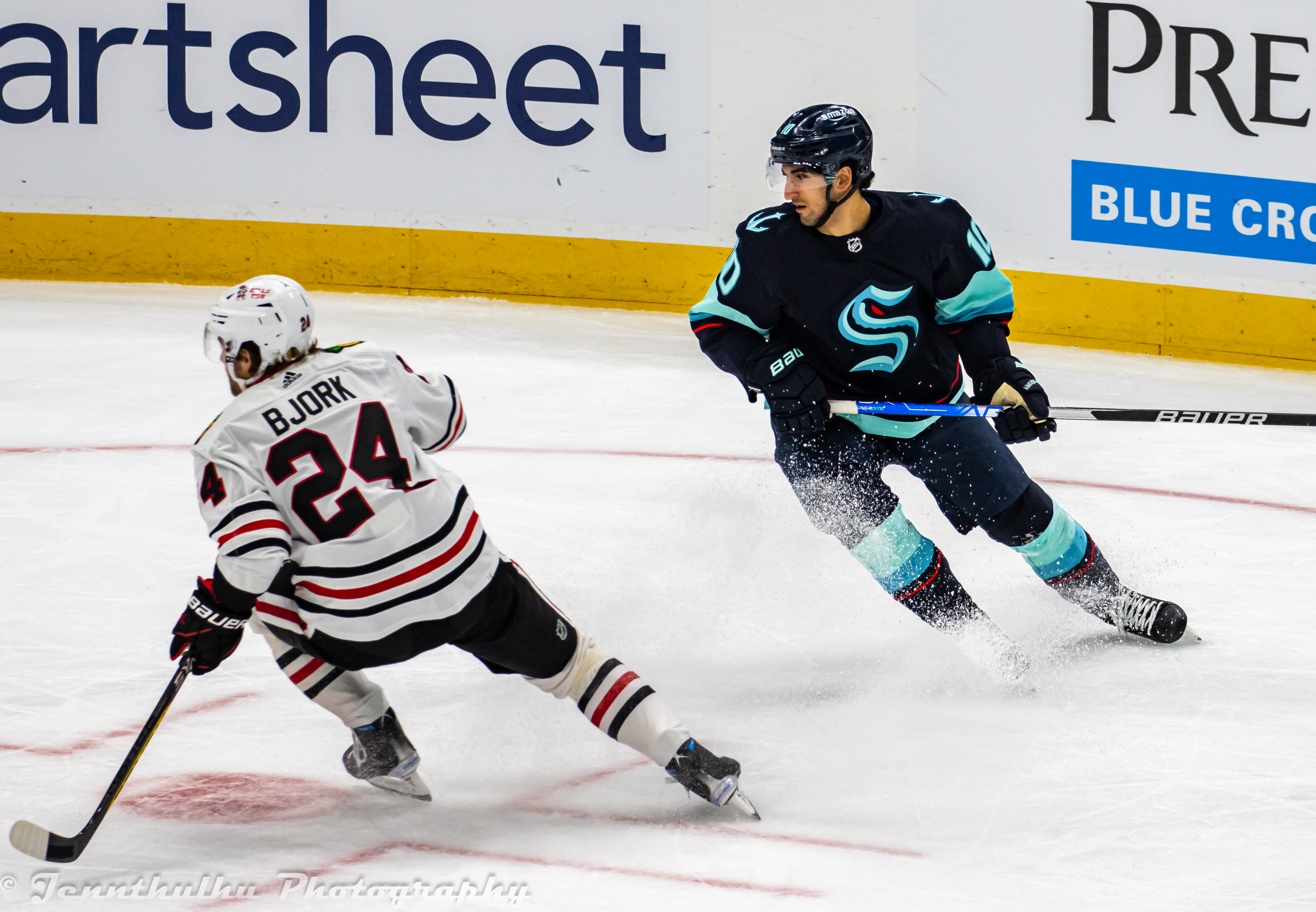
Bjork with the Blackhawks in 2023

In the final year of his contract, on March 2, 2023, on the eve of that season's trade deadline, Bjork was traded to the Chicago Blackhawks in exchange for future considerations. At the time of the trade, Bjork had spent the entire season with Buffalo's AHL affiliate, the Rochester Americans, save for one game with the Sabres on November 16, 2022. Bjork was recalled from the minors by the Blackhawks and played out the remainder of the season with the team in posting 2 goals and 8 points through 13 appearances.

As a free agent from the Blackhawks, and unable to earn an NHL contract on the open market, Bjork opted to continue his tenure within the Blackhawks organization in signing a one-year AHL contract with affiliate, the Rockford IceHogs, on August 10, 2023.

==== Later years ====
Leading into the 2024–25 season, Bjork remained an un-signed free agent following his tenure with the IceHogs. At the mid-point of the season, Bjork agreed to a PTO to join the Milwaukee Admirals of the AHL, the primary affiliate to the Nashville Predators, on January 12, 2025.

== Personal life ==
Before Notre Dame, Bjork went to high school at Pioneer High School in Ann Arbor, when he moved there to play for the USA Hockey National Team Development Program. Bjork's family includes several Notre Dame alumni. His parents, Kirt and Patricia, both of whom are of Swedish descent, his sisters Brinya and Keali, and cousin Erik Condra all attended the school. Kirt Bjork also played hockey for Notre Dame. During college, Anders was enrolled in the Mendoza College of Business. He has a younger brother, Brady, who has committed to play hockey at University of Notre Dame.

== Career statistics ==
Medal record

Representing United States

Ice hockey

World Junior Championships
Bronze medal – third place	2016 Finland	

IIHF World U18 Championship
Gold medal – first place	2014 Finland	

World U-17 Hockey Challenge
Bronze medal – third place	2013 Quebec	

=== Regular season and playoffs ===
			Regular season					Playoffs
Season	Team	League	GP	G	A	Pts	PIM	GP	G	A	Pts	PIM
2012–13	U.S. NTDP Juniors	USHL	38	8	7	15	28	—	—	—	—	—
2012–13	U.S. NTDP U17	USDP	56	12	12	24	48	—	—	—	—	—
2013–14	U.S. NTDP Juniors	USHL	26	9	12	21	0	—	—	—	—	—
2013–14	U.S. NTDP U18	USDP	61	21	20	41	10	—	—	—	—	—
2014–15	University of Notre Dame	HE	41	7	15	22	14	—	—	—	—	—
2015–16	University of Notre Dame	HE	35	12	23	35	8	—	—	—	—	—
2016–17	University of Notre Dame	HE	39	21	31	52	16	—	—	—	—	—
2017–18	Boston Bruins	NHL	30	4	8	12	6	—	—	—	—	—
2017–18	Providence Bruins	AHL	9	2	2	4	2	—	—	—	—	—
2018–19	Boston Bruins	NHL	20	1	2	3	2	—	—	—	—	—
2018–19	Providence Bruins	AHL	13	1	9	10	2	—	—	—	—	—
2019–20	Providence Bruins	AHL	7	3	5	8	4	—	—	—	—	—
2019–20	Boston Bruins	NHL	58	9	10	19	10	10	0	1	1	6
2020–21	Boston Bruins	NHL	30	2	3	5	10	—	—	—	—	—
2020–21	Buffalo Sabres	NHL	15	3	3	6	4	—	—	—	—	—
2021–22	Buffalo Sabres	NHL	58	5	3	8	10	—	—	—	—	—
2022–23	Rochester Americans	AHL	42	8	17	25	16	—	—	—	—	—
2022–23	Buffalo Sabres	NHL	1	0	0	0	0	—	—	—	—	—
2022–23	Chicago Blackhawks	NHL	13	2	6	8	2	—	—	—	—	—
2023–24	Rockford IceHogs	AHL	40	10	17	27	10	—	—	—	—	—
2024–25	Milwaukee Admirals	AHL	31	4	8	12	8	—	—	—	—	—
NHL totals			225	26	35	61	44	10	0	1	1	6

=== International ===
Year	Team	Event	Result	GP	G	A	Pts	PIM
2013	United States	U17	3rd place, bronze medalist(s)	6	0	1	1	8
2014	United States	U18	1st place, gold medalist(s)	7	2	0	2	4
2016	United States	WJC	3rd place, bronze medalist(s)	7	3	0	3	0
2017	United States	WC	5th	5	0	0	0	0
2023	United States	WC	4th	10	0	2	2	2
Junior totals				20	5	1	6	12
Senior totals				15	0	2	2	2

== Awards and honors ==
Award	Year	Source
College
HE Second All-Star Team	2016	
HE First All-Star Team	2017	
AHCA East Second-Team All-American	2017	
Hobey Baker Award (finalist)	2017	

Awards and achievements
Preceded by Kevin Boyle	Hockey East Three-Stars Award; 2017; With: Clayton Keller and Tyler Kelleher	Succeeded by Adam Gaudette
