= Kirt Bjork =

American ice hockey player (born 1961)

- Born: March 5, 1961 (age 65) Trenton, Michigan, USA
- Height: 5 ft 8 in (173 cm)
- Weight: 173 lb (78 kg; 12 st 5 lb)
- Position: Left wing
- Shot: Left
- Played for: Notre Dame; Alleghe; Adirondack Red Wings
- Playing career: 1979–1984

Kirt Bjork is an American retired ice hockey left wing who was an All-American for Notre Dame.

== Career ==
Bjork was recruited to Notre Dame straight out of high school, beginning his college career in the fall of 1979. He put up pedestrian numbers as a freshman but saw a vast improvement in his second season. Bjork more than tripled his goal production despite the Fighting Irish finishing near the bottom of the WCHA. Bjork's continued improvement, as well as a move to the CCHA, helped ND produce one of its best seasons as they tied a program record for wins with 23. Notre Dame reached the first championship game in program history and were looking to become a major player in their new conference.

As a senior Bjork led the team in just about every offensive category. For the fourth consecutive year he increased his goals, assists and points but Notre Dame couldn't keep the puck out of the net. The team allowed 51 more goals than they scored in 36 games and dropped to 8th in the conference. Despite the team's decline, Bjork was named as an All-American and was the last bright spot for the program before a funding crisis caused a severe decline that lasted for over a decade.

After graduating, Bjork played for Alleghe in the Italian Hockey League, averaging nearly 4 points a game. He finished out the year with a brief appearance for the Adirondack Red Wings and then retired as a player.

== Personal life ==
Kirt's son Anders also played hockey at Notre Dame, spending three years with the program before embarking on an NHL career. A second son, Brady, began attending Notre Dame in 2020 but sat out the 2021 season due to the COVID-19 pandemic. Kirt also had a nephew, Erik Condra, play at Notre Dame before pursuing a professional career that included several years in the NHL.

== Statistics ==
=== Regular season and playoffs ===
			Regular Season					Playoffs
Season	Team	League	GP	G	A	Pts	PIM	GP	G	A	Pts	PIM
1977–78	Paddock Pool Saints	GLJHL	—	—	—	—	—	—	—	—	—	—
1979–80	Notre Dame	WCHA	35	6	13	19	22	—	—	—	—	—
1980–81	Notre Dame	WCHA	36	19	16	35	38	—	—	—	—	—
1981–82	Notre Dame	CCHA	35	22	22	44	26	—	—	—	—	—
1982–83	Notre Dame	CCHA	35	29	34	63	26	—	—	—	—	—
1983–84	HC Alleghe	Italy	28	45	52	97	39	—	—	—	—	—
1983–84	Adirondack Red Wings	AHL	7	1	3	4	4	7	2	3	5	4
NCAA totals			141	76	85	161	112	—	—	—	—	—

== Awards and honors ==
Award	Year	Source
All-CCHA Second team	1982–83	
AHCA West All-American	1982–83	
