= Notre Dame Fighting Irish men's ice hockey =

College ice hockey team

- Current season
- University: University of Notre Dame
- Conference: Big Ten
- First season: 1911–12
- Athletic director: Pete Bevacqua
- Head coach: Brock Sheahan; 2nd season, 9–23–5 (.311)
- Assistant coaches: Andy Slaggert; Mike Garman; Andrew Oglevie
- Arena: Compton Family Ice Arena; Notre Dame, Indiana
- Colors: Blue and gold

NCAA tournament runner-up
- 2008, 2018

NCAA tournament Frozen Four
- 2008, 2011, 2017, 2018

NCAA tournament appearances
- 2004, 2007, 2008, 2009, 2011, 2013, 2014, 2016, 2017, 2018, 2019, 2021, 2022

Conference tournament champions
- ACHA: 1988; CCHA: 2007, 2009, 2013; Big Ten: 2018, 2019

Conference regular season champions
- CCHA: 2007, 2009; Big Ten: 2018

Current uniform

The Notre Dame Fighting Irish men's ice hockey team is the college ice hockey team of the University of Notre Dame, competing at the NCAA Division I level as an associate member of the Big Ten Conference. The Irish play their home games at Compton Family Ice Arena. The head coach of the Fighting Irish is Brock Sheahan.

== Conference history ==
Prior to the 2013–14 season, the team competed in the Central Collegiate Hockey Association, and also won its last ever conference championship. In the 2013–2014 season, the team began to play in the Hockey East conference, where it played until the conclusion of the 2016–2017 season. Beginning in the 2017–2018 season, the team joined the Big Ten Conference.

== History ==
Ice hockey has existed on and off as both a club and varsity sport at Notre Dame since 1912. The modern era of Notre Dame hockey began in 1968, when the Fighting Irish began to play as a Division I independent. In 1971, the team joined its first conference, the Western Collegiate Hockey Association (WCHA). The team continued playing in the WCHA for a decade until moving to the Central Collegiate Hockey Association (CCHA) with the conference's three Michigan schools in 1981.

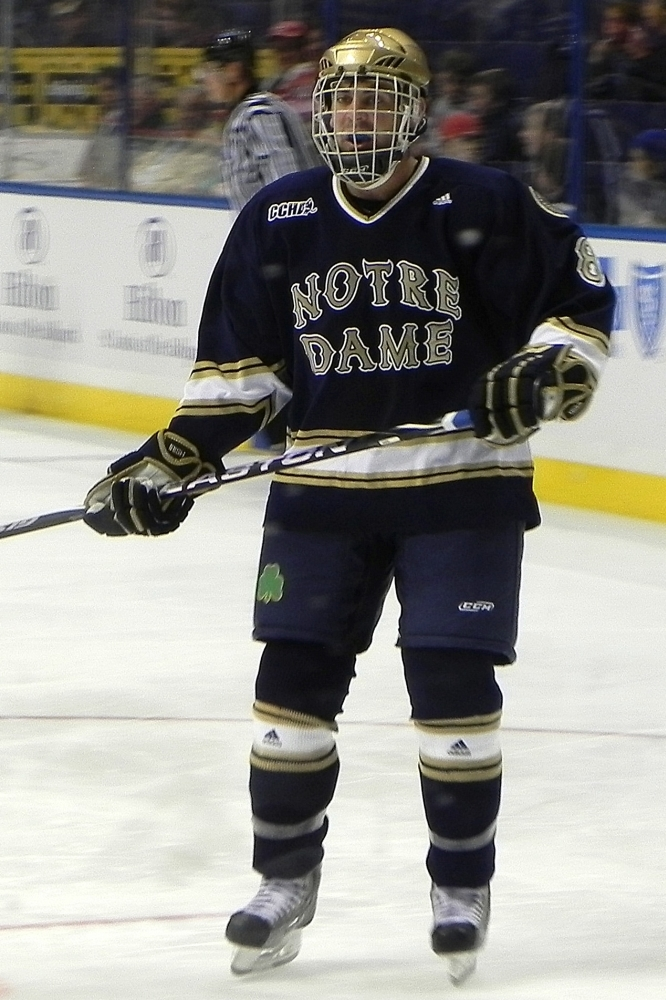
Notre Dame hockey player in an away uniform (2010).

The Fighting Irish spent two years in the new CCHA but were downgraded to a club sport for the 1983–1984 season due to financial concerns and Title IX compliance. Competing at the club level allowed players to transfer without having to sit out a year under NCAA rules. During that season, the Fighting Irish played in the Central States Collegiate Hockey League (CSCHL). Notre Dame finished that season second in the CSCHL with a record of 13–2–0. In 1984–1985 Notre Dame Hockey was once again elevated to varsity status with the team playing as a Division I independent. In 1992 Notre Dame rejoined the CCHA. The Irish struggled to remain competitive in the CCHA, but began to improve under head coach Dave Poulin. In 2004, Poulin led the team to its first ever NCAA Tournament. However, the following season was dramatically different. They only won five games, the worst season in school history. Poulin resigned after the season.

=== Jeff Jackson era ===
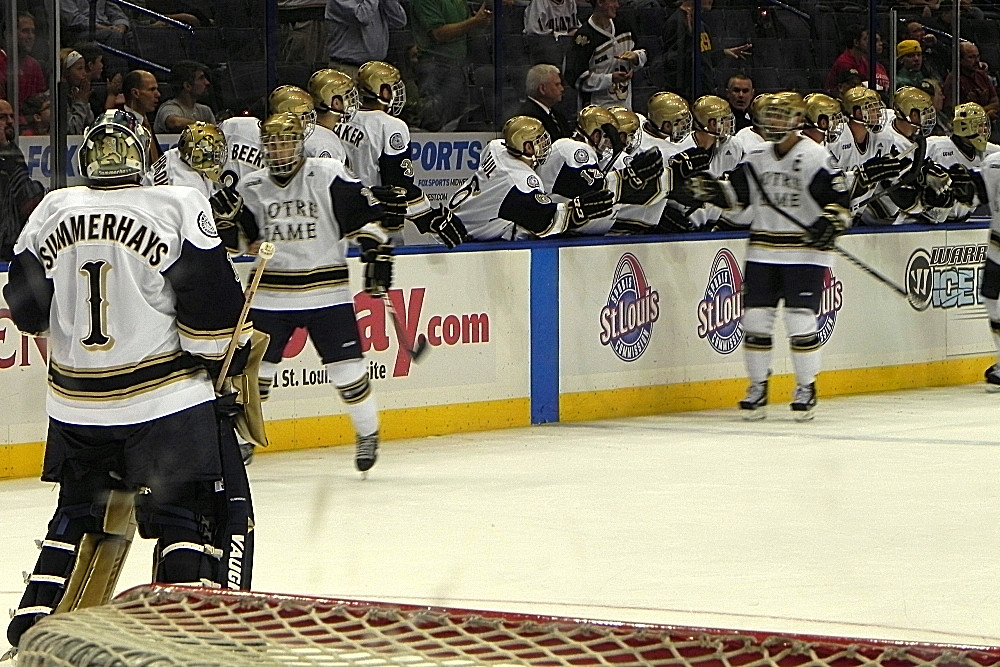
Jeff Jackson and coaching staff look on as Notre Dame celebrates a goal (2010).

In 2005, Jeff Jackson took over as head coach. Jackson, who had already won two national championships at Lake Superior State University, had an immediate impact at Notre Dame. In his first season with the Irish, the team greatly improved upon the five-win season, boosting its record to 13–19–5. 2007 was even more successful. The Irish achieved their first ever number one ranking in both the Uscho.com and USA Today Polls and their first number one seeding for the NCAA Tournament. The following year, the Irish finished fourth in both the CCHA's regular season and playoffs, and again made the NCAA Tournament. Once there, the Irish went on to beat top-seeded New Hampshire 7–3 and third-seeded Michigan State 3–1 to advance to the Frozen Four for the first time in school history. From there, they defeated first-seeded Michigan in overtime to advance to the national title game, ultimately losing to Boston College 4–1. Notre Dame also became the first four-seed to advance to the national semi-finals, and eventually to the national title game since the new 16-team format was introduced in 2003. In the 2008–2009 season, the Irish added another CCHA regular season title and a CCHA Tournament title, defeating Michigan 5–2 in the title game. Notre Dame advanced to the 2009 NCAA Tournament where the Irish was upset by 16th seeded Bemidji State 1–5.

The following season, Notre Dame finished with a record of 13–17–8 and ended the season after being swept by Ohio State two games to none in the three game opening round series of the CCHA Playoffs. The Irish rebounded in the 2010–11 regular season at 23–13–5, and clinched their second trip to the Frozen Four in program history by defeating New Hampshire 2–1 in the Northeast Regional Final. The Fighting Irish faced the East Regional Champion Minnesota-Duluth in the national semi-finals. The Irish fell to the eventual national champion 3–4.

In October 2011, Notre Dame announced the team will join Hockey East starting in the 2013–14 season, in response to the conference realignment. The university also announced an expanded television broadcast deal with NBC. The Fighting Irish Hockey began the 2011–12 season in the Edmund P. Joyce Center and played the last hockey game at the Joyce Center on October 15, 2011, against Ohio State. The team opened the university's new 5,000-seat Compton Family Ice Arena on October 21, 2011, against Rensselaer. Following the move into the new arena the Irish improved to a 7–3 home record in the new facility that included wins over future Hockey East rivals, Boston University, ranked 3rd in the NCAA, Boston College, ranked 4th, and 8th ranked Western Michigan. On January 4, 2012, former coach and long-time Notre Dame Athletic Department employee, Charles "Lefty" Smith died. Smith coached the team from 1968 to 1987 as the first varsity ice hockey after helping the program transition from club to varsity status. Following his coaching career, he continued at Notre Dame in the athletic department until retiring just three days before his death. The Fighting Irish finished the regular season with an overall record of 17–16–3 and a conference record of 12–13–3. The team defeated Ohio State in the opening round of the 2012 CCHA Tournament, sweeping the Buckeyes in two games by scores of 2–0 and 4–2. In the second round of the CCHA Tournament, the team was defeated by the Michigan Wolverines in two games in a series that saw the first game go into a double overtime. The team was defeated in the first round of the NCAA regional playoffs in 2013 and 2014, both times by the St. Cloud State Huskies.

On June 24, 2024, Jackson announced he would step down as head coach following the 2024–25 season, after 20 seasons at Notre Dame. On March 7, 2025, during the first quarterfinals game of the 2025 Big Ten men's ice hockey tournament against Minnesota, Jackson earned his 600th career victory.

=== Brock Sheahan era ===
On March 17, 2025, Brock Sheahan was named the head coach for Notre Dame.

== Season-by-season results ==
Source:

== Head coaches ==
=== All-time coaching records ===
As of completion of 2024–25 season

Tenure	Coach	Years	Record	Pct.
1911–1912	No Coach	1	1–0–0	1.000
1912–1913	G.R. Walsh	1	1–2–0	.333
1919–1923	Paul Castner	4	19–5–1	.780
1923–1926	Tom Lieb	3	3–9–3	.300
1926–1927	Benjamin Dubois	1	3–7–1	.318
1968–1987	Lefty Smith	18†	285–314–30	.477
1987–1995	Ric Schafer	8	112–152–15	.428
1995–2005	Dave Poulin	10	139–197–50	.425
2005–2025	Jeff Jackson	20	419–291–74	.575
2025–present	Brock Sheahan	0	0–0–0	–
Totals	9 coaches	66 Seasons	982–977–174	.501

† The Program was dropped to club status for the 1983–84 season.

== Postseason ==
=== NCAA Tournament Results ===
The Fighting Irish have appeared in the NCAA Tournament 13 times.

Year	Seed	Round	Opponent	Results
2004	No. 4	Midwest Regional semifinal	#1 Minnesota	L 2–5
2007	No. 1	Midwest Regional semifinal Midwest Regional Final	#4 Alabama-Huntsville #3 Michigan State	W 3–2; L 1–2
2008	No. 4	West Regional semifinal West Regional Final; Frozen Four; National Championship	#1 New Hampshire #3 Michigan State #1 Michigan #2 Boston College	W 7–3; W 3–1; W 5–4; L 1–4
2009	No. 1	Midwest Regional semifinal	#4 Bemidji State	L 1–5
2011	No. 3	Northeast Regional semifinal Northeast Regional Final; Frozen Four	#2 Merrimack #4 New Hampshire #3 Minnesota-Duluth	W 4–3; W 2–1; L 3–4
2013	No. 1	Midwest Regional semifinal	#4 St. Cloud State	L 1–5
2014	No. 2	West Regional semifinal	#3 St. Cloud State	L 3–4
2016	No. 3	Midwest Regional semifinal	#2 Michigan	L 2–3
2017	No. 4	Northeast Regional semifinal Northeast Regional Final; Frozen Four	#1 Minnesota #2 UMass-Lowell #1 Denver	W 3–2; W 3–2; L 1–6
2018	No. 1	East Regional semifinal East Regional Final; Frozen Four; National Championship	#4 Michigan Tech #2 Providence #2 Michigan #3 Minnesota-Duluth	W 4–3; W 2–1; W 4–3; L 1–2
2019	No. 3	Northeast Regional semifinal Northeast Regional Final	#2 Clarkson #1 UMass	W 3–2; L 0–4
2021	No. 4	East Regional semifinal	#1 Boston College	No Contest – Covid Cancellation
2022	No. 3	East Regional semifinal East Regional Final	#2 North Dakota #1 Minnesota St.	W 2–1 OT; L 0–1

== Statistical leaders ==
=== Career points leaders ===
Player	Years	GP	G	A	Pts	PIM
Brian Walsh	1973–1977	140	89	145	234	273
John Noble	1969–1973	123	81	145	226	159
Eddie Bumbacco	1970–1974	133	103	117	220	71
Ian Williams	1970–1974	126	92	119	211	239
Mike McNeill	1984–1988	124	83	115	198	80
Dave Poulin	1978–1982	135	89	107	196	175
Greg Meredith	1976–1980	149	104	88	192	72
Paul Regan	1969–1973	125	89	97	186	272
Clark Hamilton	1973–1977	145	70	113	183	231
Dave Bankoske	1988–1993	141	73	109	182	86

=== Career goaltending leaders ===
GP = Games played; Min = Minutes played; W = Wins; L = Losses; T = Ties; GA = Goals against; SO = Shutouts; SV% = Save percentage; GAA = Goals against average

minimum 30 games played

Player	Years	GP	Min	W	L	T	GA	SO	SV%	GAA
Jordan Pearce	2005–2009	94	5506	59	26	7	182	12	.918	1.98
Cale Morris	2016–2020	73	4299	46	21	4	148	8	.938	2.07
Steve Summerhays	2010–2014	106	5909	57	38	5	216	13	.914	2.19
Cal Petersen	2014–2017	110	6499	55	39	15	249	11	.924	2.31
David Brown	2003–2007	111	6326	55	38	11	245	8	.916	2.32

Statistics current through the end of the 2023–24 season.

== Players ==
=== Current roster ===
As of August 16, 2025.

No.	Nat.	Player	Class	Pos	Height	Weight	DoB	Hometown	Previous team	NHL rights
2	(United States)	Jimmy Jurcev	Sophomore	D	6' 5" (1.96 m)	200 lb (91 kg)	2003-05-05	Palos Heights, Illinois	Lincoln Stars (USHL)	—
4	(Canada)	Michael Mastrodomenico	Senior	D	6' 0" (1.83 m)	210 lb (95 kg)	2004-04-19	Kirkland, Quebec	Lincoln Stars (USHL)	—
5	(Sweden)	Axel Kumlin	Senior	D	6' 1" (1.85 m)	196 lb (89 kg)	2002-02-23	Stockholm, Sweden	Miami (NCHC)	—
6	(United States)	Drew Mackie	Freshman	D	6' 0" (1.83 m)	187 lb (85 kg)	2005-06-17	Anchorage, Alaska	Brooks Bandits (BCHL)	—
8	(United States)	Will Belle	Freshman	F	6' 4" (1.93 m)	225 lb (102 kg)	2007-01-14	Minnetonka, Minnesota	USNTDP (USHL)	TOR, 137th overall 2025
9	(Canada)	Cole Brown	Freshman	F	6' 3" (1.91 m)	190 lb (86 kg)	2005-04-27	Aurora, Ontario	Brantford Bulldogs (OHL)	NJD, 164th overall 2023
11	(United States)	Danny Nelson	Junior	F	6' 2" (1.88 m)	215 lb (98 kg)	2005-08-03	Maple Grove, Minnesota	USNTDP (USHL)	NYI, 49th overall 2023
12	(United States)	Henry Nelson	Junior	D	6' 1" (1.85 m)	197 lb (89 kg)	2003-03-25	Maple Grove, Minnesota	Lincoln Stars (USHL)	—
13	(United States)	Brennan Ali	Junior	F	6' 0" (1.83 m)	194 lb (88 kg)	2004-02-09	Glencoe, Illinois	Lincoln Stars (USHL)	DET, 212th overall 2023
14	(United States)	Maddox Fleming	Junior	F	5' 11" (1.8 m)	198 lb (90 kg)	2004-02-13	Rochester, Minnesota	Sioux Falls Stampede (USHL)	—
15	(Canada)	Jayden Davis	Junior	F	5' 10" (1.78 m)	190 lb (86 kg)	2003-03-02	Calgary, Alberta	Green Bay Gamblers (USHL)	—
16	(United States)	Paul Fischer	Junior	D	6' 0" (1.83 m)	203 lb (92 kg)	2005-01-30	River Forest, Illinois	USNTDP (USHL)	EDM, 138th overall 2023
17	(Canada)	Pano Fimis	Freshman	F	5' 11" (1.8 m)	183 lb (83 kg)	2004-06-17	Richmond Hill, Ontario	Erie Otters (OHL)	—
18	(United States)	Jack Larrigan	Sophomore	F	5' 10" (1.78 m)	178 lb (81 kg)	2004-04-09	St. Louis, Missouri	Cedar Rapids RoughRiders (USHL)	—
19	(United States)	Evan Werner	Sophomore	F	5' 8" (1.73 m)	175 lb (79 kg)	2003-02-13	Flower Mound, Texas	Michigan (Big Ten)	—
20	(Canada)	Niko Jovanovic	Senior	F	6' 3" (1.91 m)	223 lb (101 kg)	2002-06-13	West Vancouver, British Columbia	Spruce Grove Saints (AJHL)	—
21	(United States)	Jaedon Kerr	Sophomore	D	6' 4" (1.93 m)	218 lb (99 kg)	2003-09-13	Elk River, Minnesota	Waterloo Black Hawks (USHL)	—
22	(United States)	Cole Knuble	Junior	F	5' 10" (1.78 m)	191 lb (87 kg)	2004-07-01	Grand Rapids, Michigan	Fargo Force (USHL)	PHI, 103rd overall 2023
23	(United States)	Michael Schermerhorn	Sophomore	F	6' 0" (1.83 m)	216 lb (98 kg)	2003-10-14	Traverse City, Michigan	New Mexico Ice Wolves (NAHL)	—
24	(United States)	Dashel Oliver	Freshman	F	5' 10" (1.78 m)	185 lb (84 kg)	2005-02-24	Bloomington, Indiana	Lincoln Stars (USHL)	—
25	(United States)	Carter Slaggert	Junior	F	5' 9" (1.75 m)	175 lb (79 kg)	2005-03-04	South Bend, Indiana	USNTDP (USHL)	—
27	(Canada)	Caeden Carlisle	Freshman	D	6' 1" (1.85 m)	196 lb (89 kg)	2004-01-31	Mississauga, Ontario	Soo Greyhounds (OHL)	—
28	(United States)	Sutter Muzzatti	Graduate	F	6' 6" (1.98 m)	240 lb (109 kg)	2003-06-28	Okemos, Michigan	Renssealer (ECAC)	NSH, 143rd overall 2023
29	(United States)	Jack Williams	Senior	G	6' 3" (1.91 m)	190 lb (86 kg)	2001-06-21	St. Louis, Missouri	Waterloo Black Hawks (USHL)	—
30	(Canada)	Luke Pearson	Graduate	G	6' 2" (1.88 m)	185 lb (84 kg)	2001-01-29	Whitby, Ontario	Yale (ECAC)	—
31	(United States)	Nicholas Kempf	Sophomore	G	6' 2" (1.88 m)	192 lb (87 kg)	2006-03-01	Morton Grove, Illinois	USNTDP (USHL)	WSH, 114th overall 2024

== Awards and honors ==
=== United States Hockey Hall of Fame ===
- Bill Nyrop (1997)

=== NCAA ===
==== Individual awards ====
Spencer Penrose Award

- Jeff Jackson: 2007, 2018

Tim Taylor Award

- T. J. Tynan: 2011

Mike Richter Award

- Cale Morris: 2018

==== All-Americans ====
AHCA First Team All-Americans

- 1972–73: Bill Nyrop, D; Eddie Bumbacco, F
- 1975–76: Jack Brownschidle, D
- 1976–77: Jack Brownschidle, D; Brian Walsh, F
- 1979–80: Greg Meredith, F
- 1982–83: Kirt Bjork, F
- 2006–07: David Brown, G
- 2008–09: Ian Cole, D
- 2017–18: Cale Morris, G

AHCA Second Team All-Americans

- 1998–99: Benoit Cotnoir, D
- 2008–09: Erik Condra, F
- 2013–14: Anders Lee, F
- 2014–15: Robbie Russo, D
- 2016–17: Anders Bjork, F
- 2018–19: Bobby Nardella, D
- 2022–23: Ryan Bischel, G

=== WCHA ===
==== Individual awards ====
Most Valuable Player

- Brian Walsh: 1977

Freshman of the Year

- Brian Walsh: 1974

Coach of the Year

- Lefty Smith: 1973

==== All-Conference Teams ====
First Team All-WCHA

- 1972–73: Eddie Bumbacco, F
- 1975–76: Jack Brownschidle, D
- 1976–77: Jack Brownschidle, D; Brian Walsh, F
- 1979–80: Greg Meredith, F

Second Team All-WCHA

- 1972–73: Bill Nyrop, D; Ian Williams, F
- 1973–74: Ray Delorenzi, F
- 1976–77: John Peterson, G

=== CCHA ===
==== Individual awards ====
Player of the Year

- David Brown: 2007

Rookie of the Year

- Mark Eaton: 1998
- T. J. Tynan: 2011

Best Defensive Defenseman

- Kyle Lawson: 2009
- Sean Lorenz: 2011

Best Goaltender

- David Brown: 2007

Coach of the Year

- Jeff Jackson: 2007, 2011

Scholar-Athlete of the Year

- Cory McLean: 2005
- Jordan Pearce: 2009

Terry Flanagan Memorial Award

- Steve Noble: 1997
- Dan VeNard: 2008
- Erik Condra: 2009
- Joe Rogers: 2013

Ilitch Humanitarian Award

- Neil Komadoski: 2004

Tournament Most Valuable Player

- David Brown: 2007
- Jordan Pearce: 2009
- T. J. Tynan: 2013

==== All-Conference Teams ====
First Team All-CCHA

- 1998–99: Benoit Cotnoir, D
- 2006–07: David Brown, G
- 2008–09: Ian Cole, D
- 2011–12: T. J. Tynan, F
- 2011–12: Anders Lee, F

Second Team All-CCHA

- 1981–82: John Schmidt, D; Dave Poulin, F
- 1982–83: Kirt Bjork, F
- 1998–99: Ben Simon, F
- 2003–04: Brett Lebda, D; Aaron Gill, F; Rob Globke, F
- 2008–09: Kyle Lawson, D; Erik Condra, F; Christian Hanson, F
- 2010–11: T. J. Tynan, F; Anders Lee, F

CCHA All-Rookie Team

- 1992–93: Jamie Ling, F
- 1996–97: Joe Dusbabek, F
- 1997–98: Mark Eaton, D
- 1998–99: David Inman, F
- 2000–01: Brett Lebda, D
- 2005–06: Erik Condra, F
- 2006–07: Kyle Lawson, D; Kevin Deeth, F; Ryan Thang, F
- 2008–09: Billy Maday, F
- 2009–10: Mike Johnson, G
- 2010–11: T. J. Tynan, F; Anders Lee, F
- 2011–12: Robbie Russo, D
- 2012–13: Mario Lucia, F

=== Hockey East ===
==== Individual awards ====
Best Defensive Forward

- Sam Herr: 2016

Best Defensive Defenseman

- Dennis Gilbert: 2017

Three-Stars Award

- Anders Bjork: 2017

==== All-Conference Teams ====
First Team All-Hockey East

- 2014–15: Robbie Russo, D; Vinnie Hinostroza, F
- 2016–17: Cal Petersen, G; Anders Bjork, F

Second Team All-Hockey East

- 2013–14: Stephen Johns, D
- 2015–16: Jordan Gross, D; Anders Bjork, F

Third Team All-Hockey East

- 2016–17: Dennis Gilbert, D

Hockey East All-Rookie Team

- 2013–14: Vinnie Hinostroza, F
- 2014–15: Cal Petersen, G
- 2015–16: Bobby Nardella, D
- 2016–17: Andrew Peeke, F

=== Big Ten ===
==== Individual awards ====
Player of the Year

- Cale Morris: 2018

Goaltender of the Year

- Cale Morris: 2018
- Ryan Bischel: 2023

Tournament Most Outstanding Player

- Cale Morris: 2018, 2019

==== All-Conference Teams ====
First Team All-Big Ten

- 2017–18: Cale Morris, G; Jordan Gross, D; Jake Evans, F
- 2018–19: Bobby Nardella, D
- 2022–23: Ryan Bischel, G

Second Team All-Big Ten

- 2018–19: Cale Morris, G
- 2020–21: Spencer Stastney, D; Alex Steeves, F
- 2021–22: Max Ellis, F
- 2023–24: Landon Slaggert, F
- 2024–25: Cole Knuble, F

Big Ten All-Freshman Team

- 2018–19: Michael Graham, F

== Fighting Irish in the NHL ==
As of July 1, 2025.

= NHL All-Star team	= NHL All-Star	= NHL All-Star and NHL All-Star team	= Hall of Famers

Player	Position	Team(s)	Years	Games	Stanley Cups
Anders Bjork	Left Wing	BOS, BUF, CHI	2017–2023	225	0
Jim Brown	Defenseman	LAK	1982–1983	3	0
Jack Brownschidle	Defenseman	STL, HFD	1977–1986	494	0
Jeff Brownschidle	Defenseman	HFD	1981–1983	7	0
Callahan Burke	Right Wing	COL, CAR, VGK	2022–Present	10	0
Nathan Clurman	Defenseman	PIT	2024–Present	1	0
Ian Cole	Defenseman	STL, PIT, CBJ, COL, MIN, CAR, TBL, VAN, UTA	2010–Present	908	2
Erik Condra	Right Wing	OTT, TBL, DAL	2010–2019	372	0
Thomas Di Pauli	Forward	PIT	2019–2020	2	0
Mark Eaton	Defenseman	PHI, NSH, PIT, NYI	1999–2013	650	1
Jake Evans	Center	MTL	2019–Present	350	0
Steven Fogarty	Center	NYR, BUF, BOS, MIN	2017–2023	31	0
Dennis Gilbert	Defenseman	CHI, COL, CGY, BUF, OTT	2018–Present	111	0
Rob Globke	Right Wing	FLA	2005–2008	46	0
Jordan Gross	Defenseman	ARI, COL, NSH	2019–2023	25	0
Christian Hanson	Center	TOR	2008–2011	42	0
Vinnie Hinostroza	Center	CHI, ARI, FLA, BUF, PIT, NSH, MIN	2015–Present	412	0
Don Jackson	Defenseman	MNS, EDM, NYR	1977–1987	315	2
Stephen Johns	Defenseman	DAL	2015–2020	167	0
Brett Lebda	Defenseman	DET, TOR, CBJ	2005–2012	397	1
Anders Lee	Left Wing	NYI	2012–Present	841	0
Mike McNeill	Left Wing	CHI, QUE	1990–1992	63	0

Player	Position	Team(s)	Years	Games	Stanley Cups
Greg Meredith	Forward	CGY	1980–1983	38	0
Bill Nyrop	Defenseman	MTL, MNS	1975–1982	207	3
Wes O'Neill	Defenseman	COL	2008–2010	5	0
Victor Oreskovich	Right Wing	FLA, VAN	2009–2012	67	0
Kyle Palmieri	Right Wing	ANA, NJD, NYI	2010–Present	900	0
Andrew Peeke	Defenseman	CBJ, BOS	2019–Present	309	0
Cal Petersen	Goaltender	LAK, PHI	2018–2024	106	0
Alex Pirus	Center	MNS, DET	1976–1980	159	0
Dave Poulin	Center	PHI, BOS, WSH	1982–1995	724	0
Robbie Russo	Defenseman	DET	2016–2017	19	0
Bryan Rust	Right Wing	PIT	2014–Present	638	2
Riley Sheahan	Center	DET, PIT, FLA, EDM, BUF, SEA	2011–2023	637	0
Ben Simon	Center	ATL, CBJ	2001–2006	81	0
Landon Slaggert	Left Wing	CHI	2023–Present	49	0
Spencer Stastney	Defenseman	NSH	2022–Present	51	0
Yan Stastny	Center	EDM, BOS, STL	2005–2010	91	0
Alex Steeves	Center	TOR	2021–Present	14	0
Ryan Thang	Right Wing	NSH	2011–2012	1	0
T. J. Tynan	Right Wing	CBJ, COL, LAK	2016–2022	30	0
Mark Van Guilder	Center	NSH	2013–2014	1	0
Tim Wallace	Forward	PIT, NYI, TBL, CAR	2008–2013	101	0

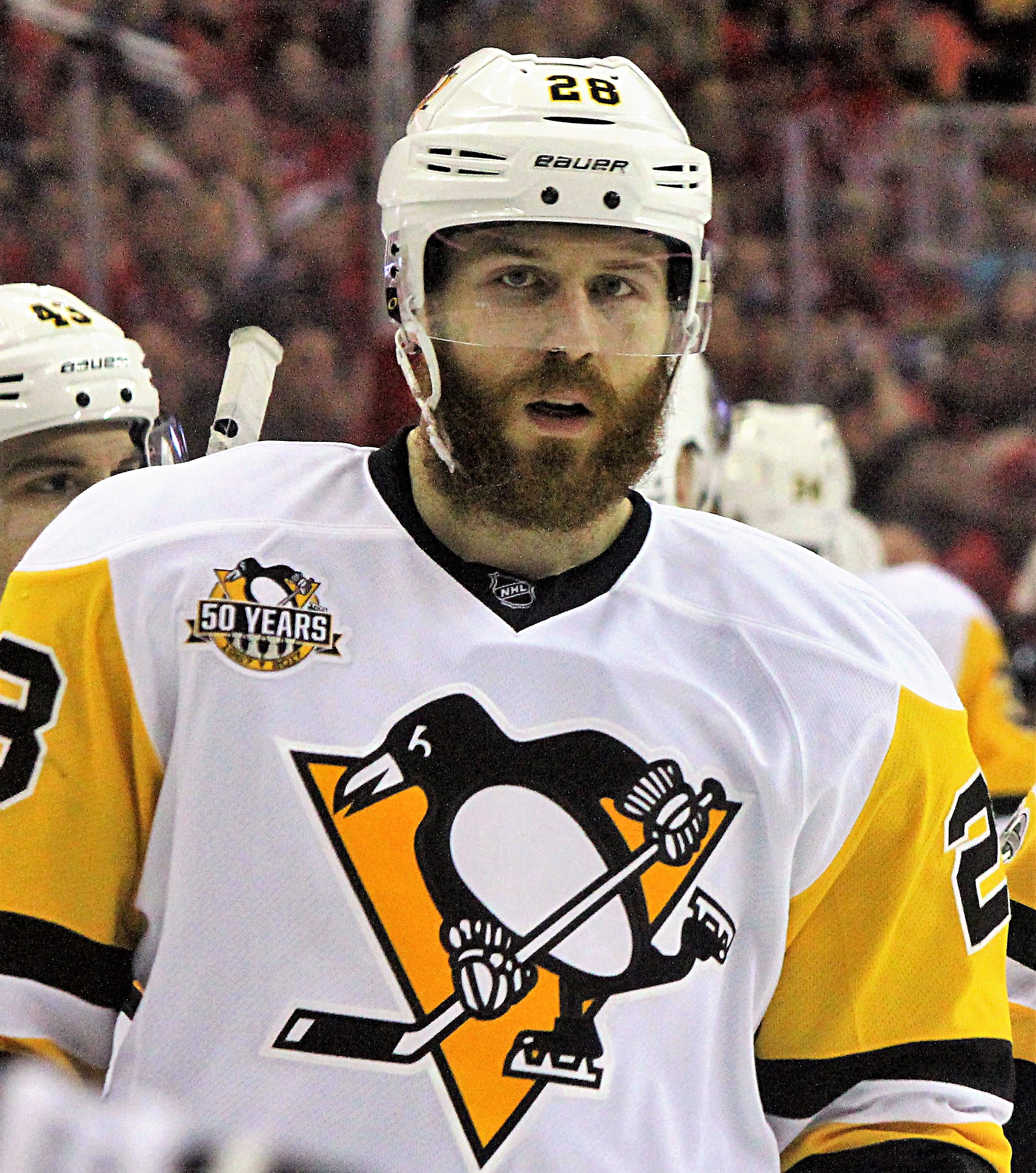
Ian Cole

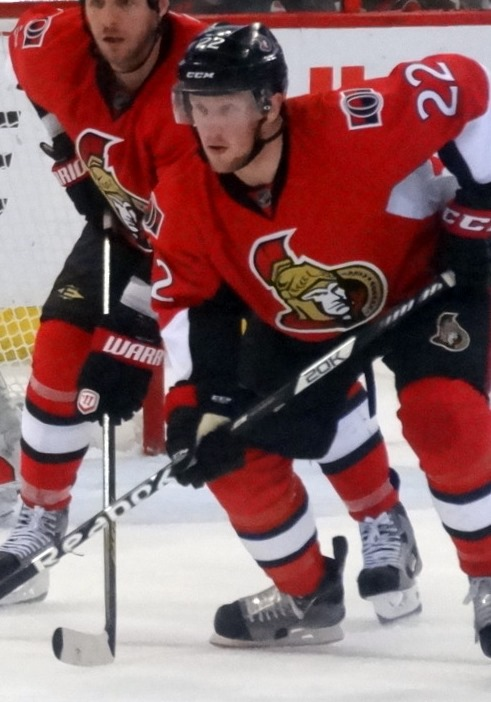
Erik Condra

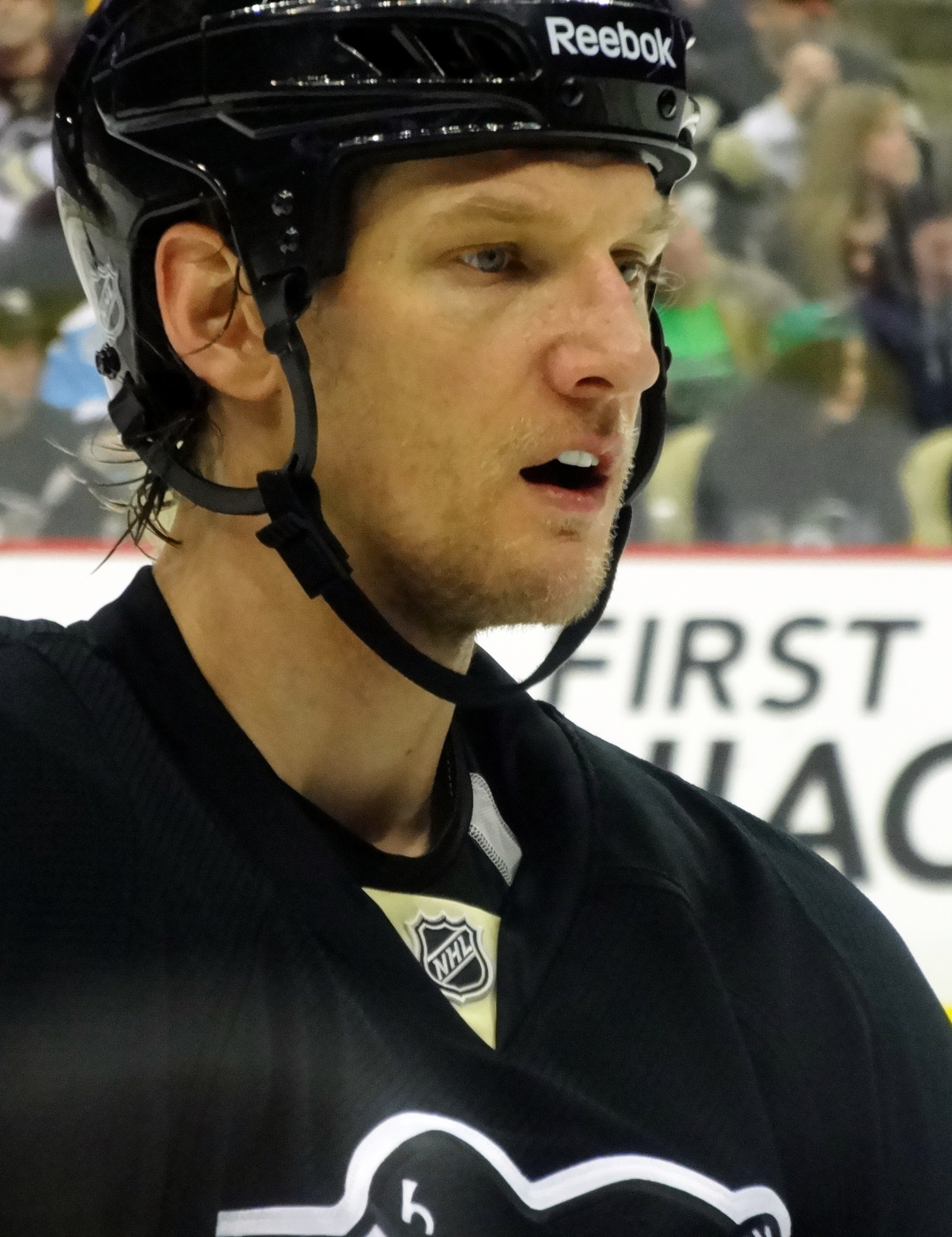
Mark Eaton

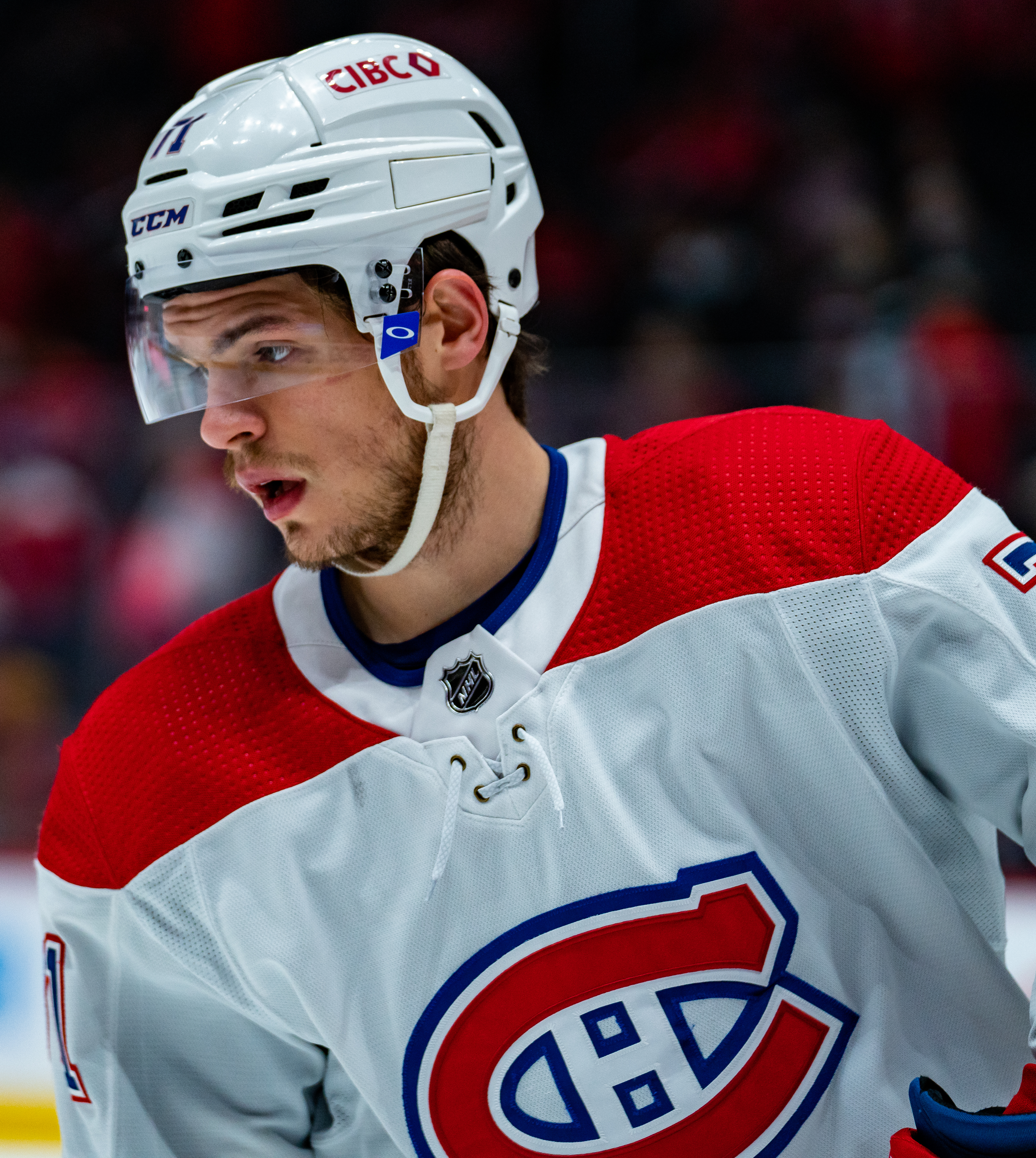
Jake Evans

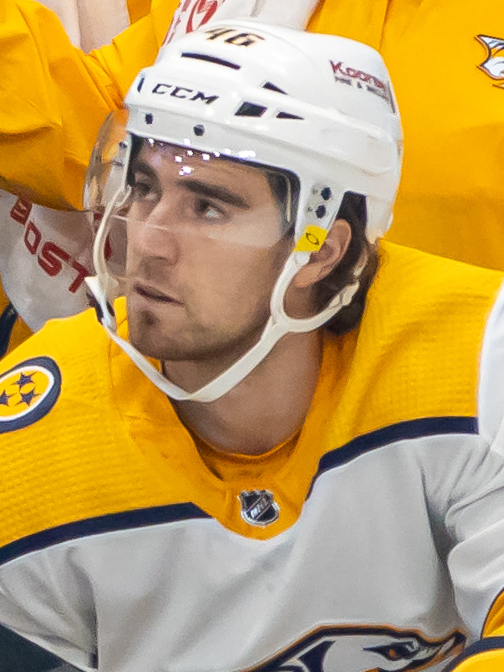
Jordan Gross

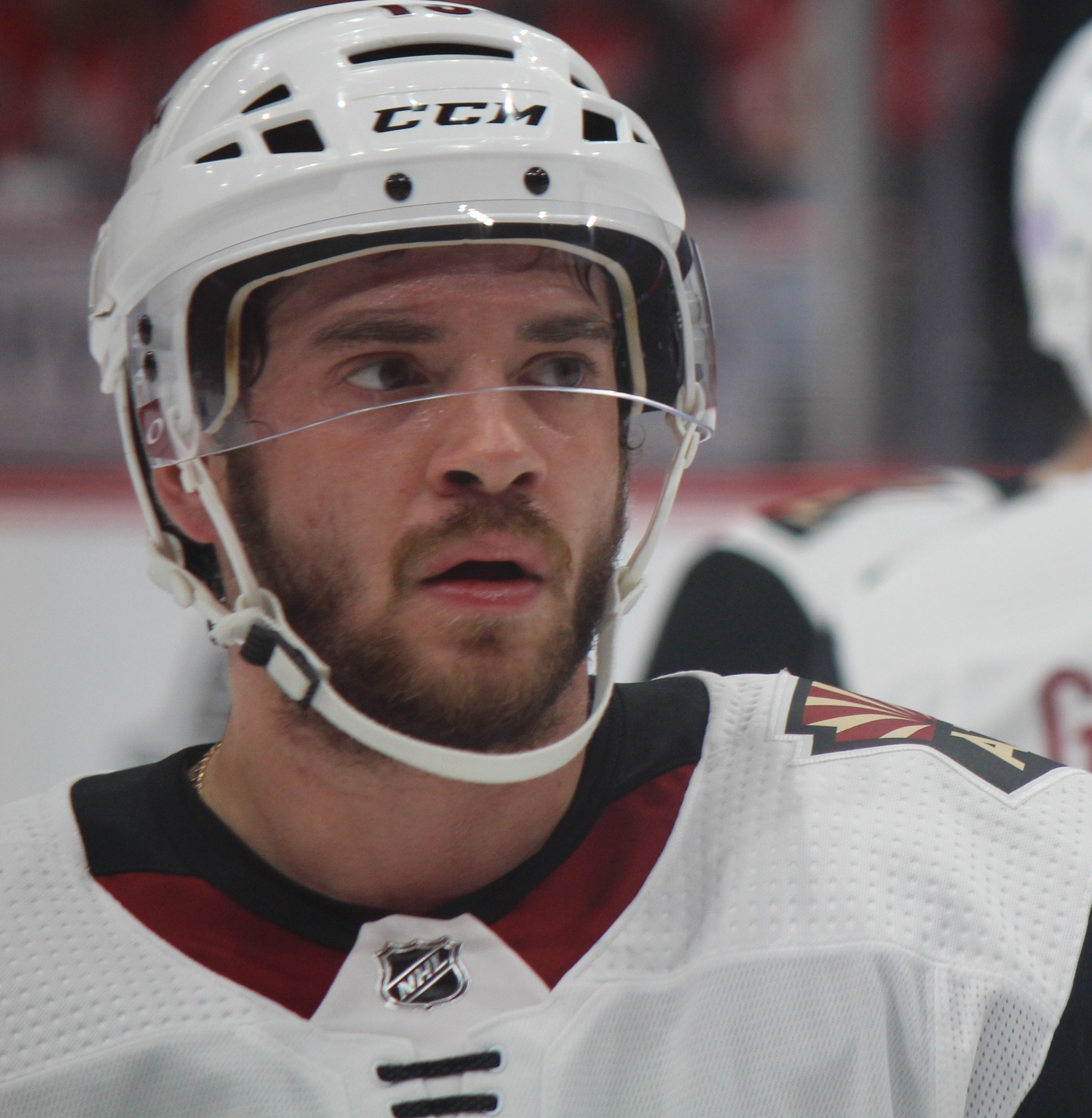
Vinnie Hinostroza

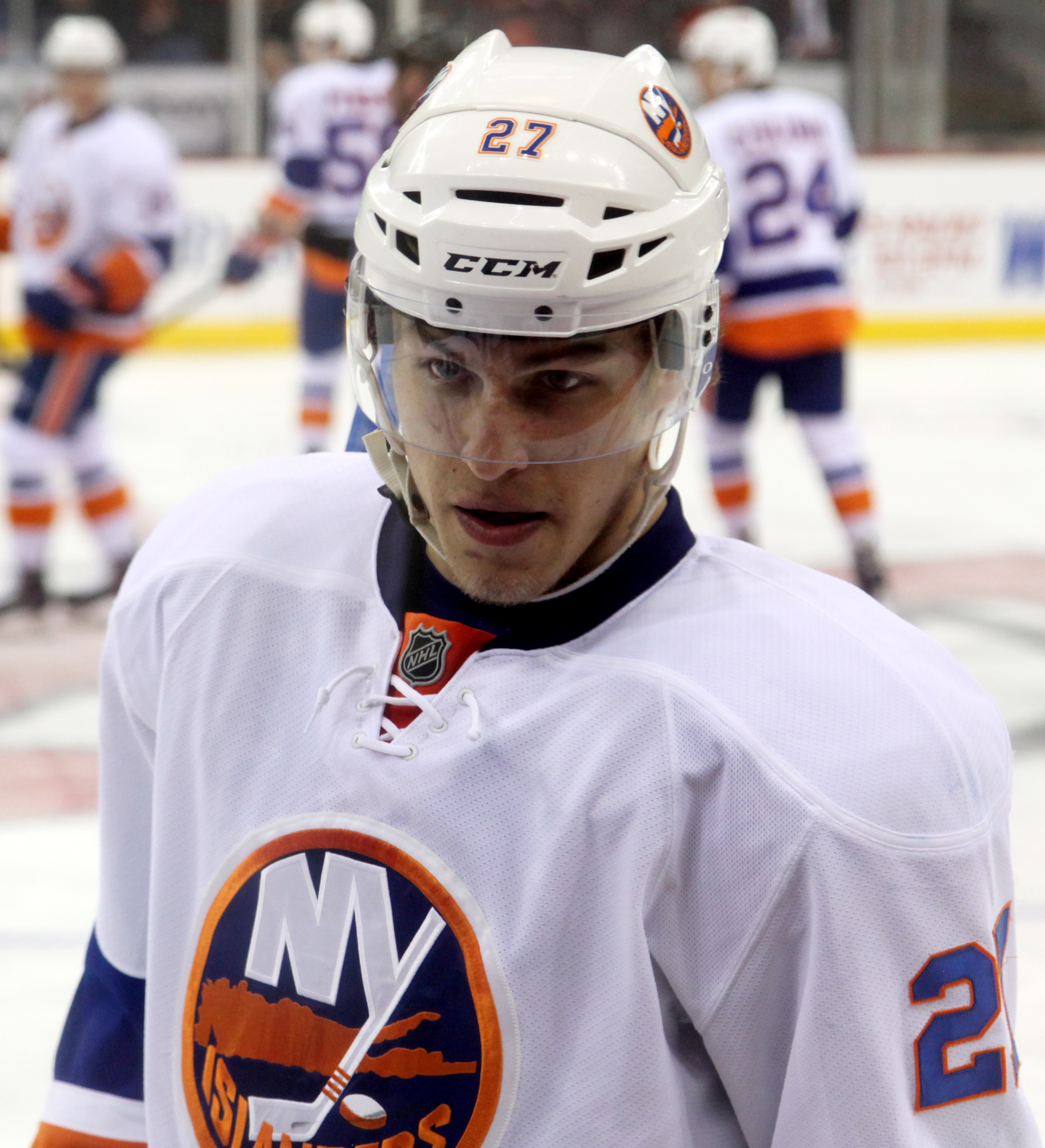
Anders Lee

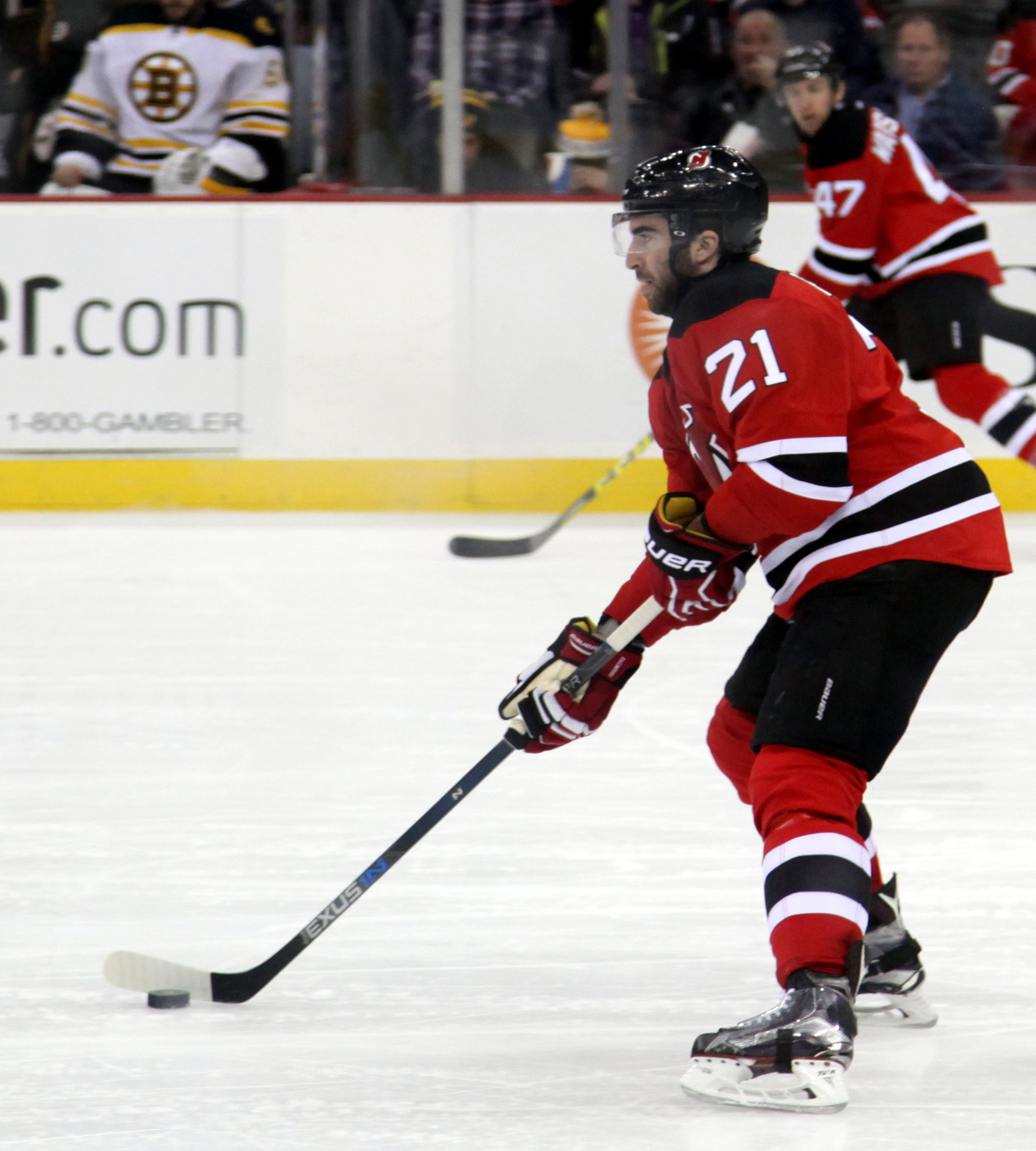
Kyle Palmieri

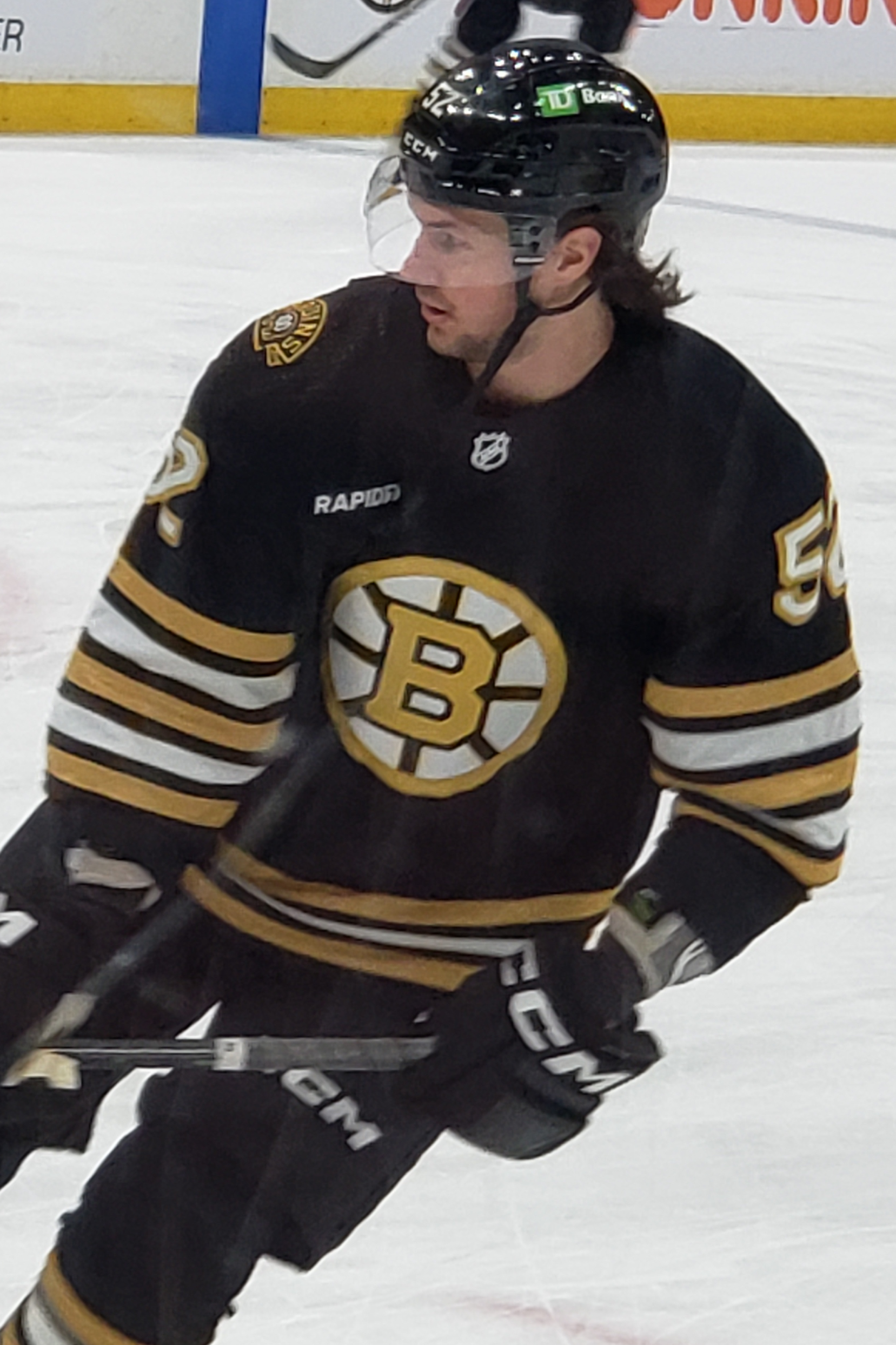
Andrew Peeke

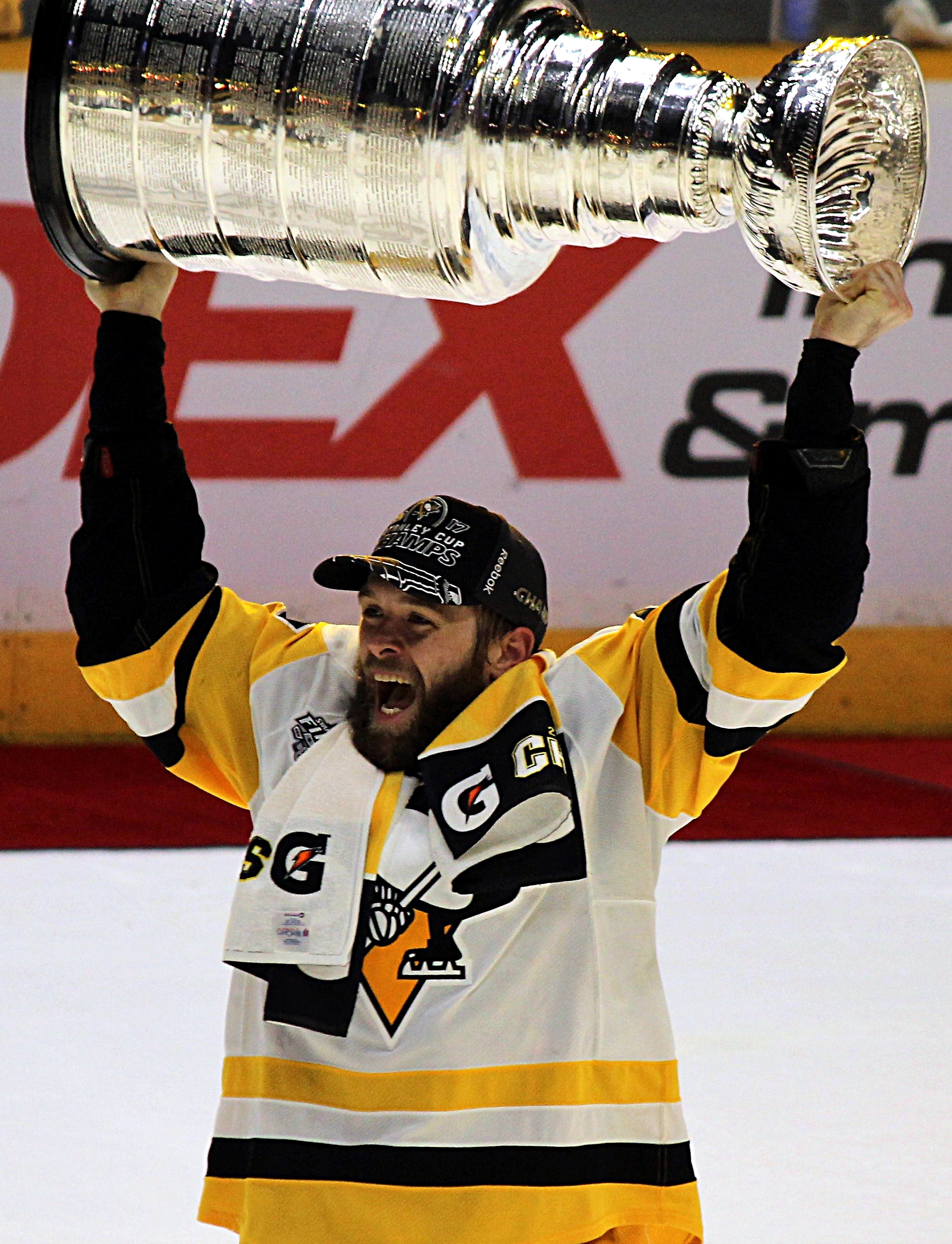
Bryan Rust

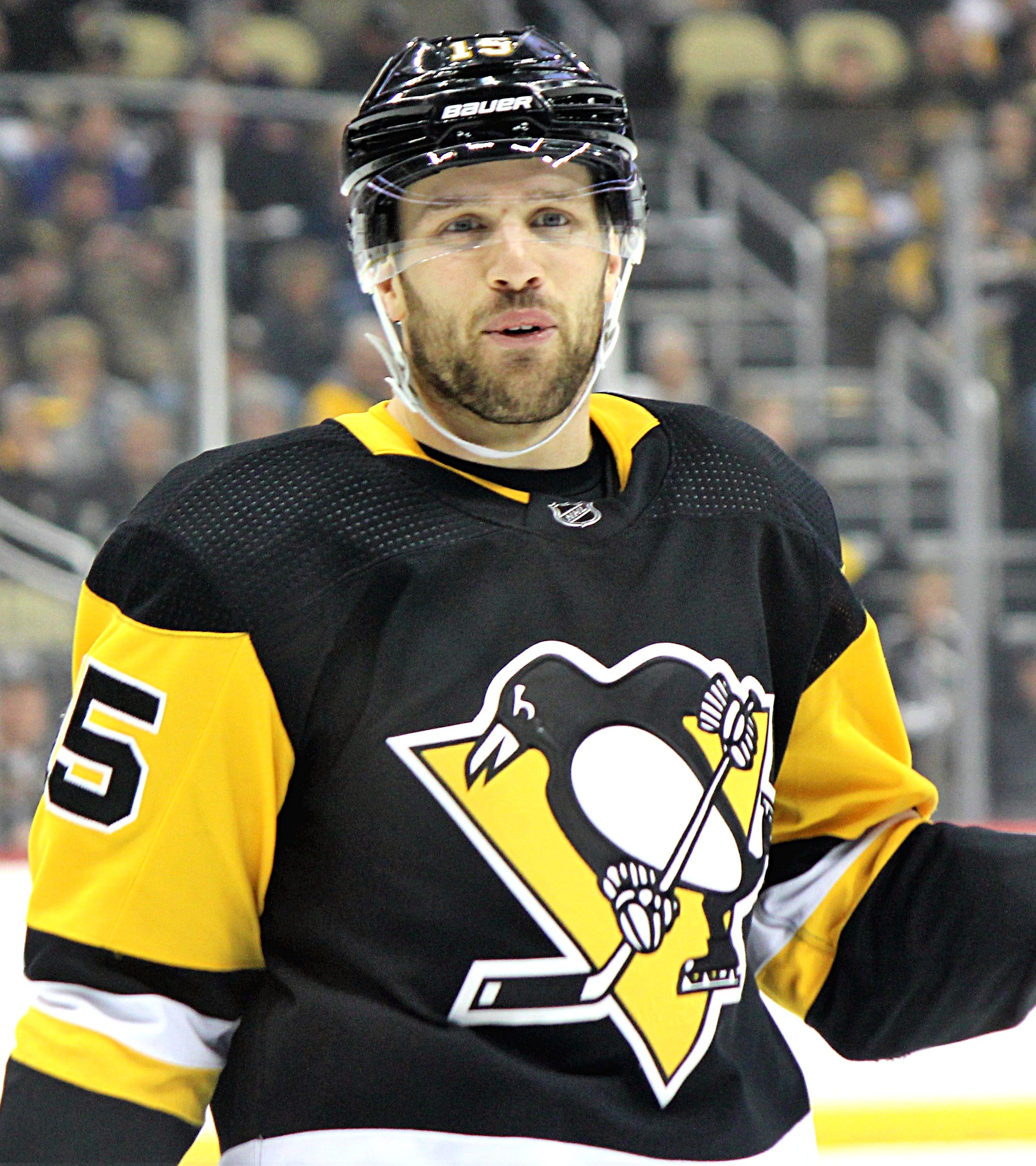
Riley Sheahan

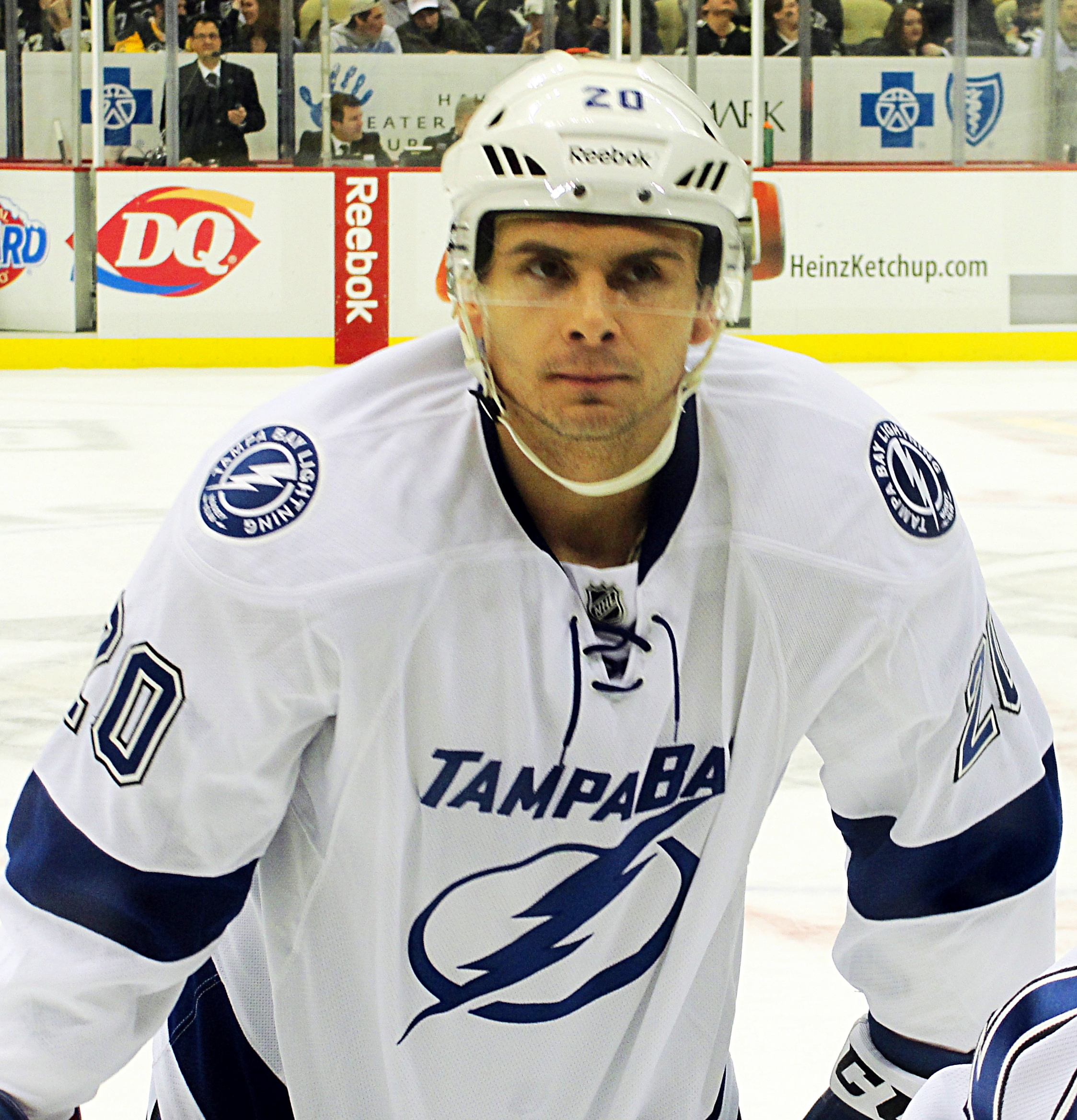
Tim Wallace

=== WHA ===
Several players also were members of WHA teams.

Player	Position	Team(s)	Years	Avco Cups
Ray Delorenzi	Wing	VNC, CAC	1974–1976	0
Larry Israelson	Wing	VNC, CAC	1974–1977	0
Kevin Nugent	Wing	IND	1978–1979	0
Brian Walsh	Right Wing	CAC	1976–1977	0

== Team captains ==
- Terry Lorenz & Steve Noble, 1996–97
- Steve Noble, 1997–98
- Brian Urick, 1998–99
- Ben Simon, 1999–2000
- Ryan Dolder, 2000–01
- Evan Nielsen, 2001–03
- Aaron Gill, 2003–04
- Cory McLean, 2004–05
- T. J. Jindra, 2005–07
- Mark Van Guilder, 2007–08
- Erik Condra, 2008–09
- Ryan Thang, 2009–10
- Joe Lavin, 2010–11
- Sean Lorenz & Billy Maday, 2011–12
- Anders Lee, 2012–13
- Jeff Costello, 2013–14
- Steven Fogarty, 2014–15
- Steven Fogarty & Robbie Russo, 2015
- Steven Fogarty, 2015–16
- Cal Petersen, 2016–17
- Jake Evans, 2017–18
- Andrew Peeke, 2018–19

== Compton Family Ice Arena ==
In February 2009, The University of Notre Dame announced it will begin construction on a new, freestanding, on-campus ice arena designed to meet the needs of both the Irish hockey team and the local community. Construction on the 5,022-seat arena began on March 15, 2010, with the venue opening in the Fall of 2011. The arena held its first Notre Dame hockey game on October 21, 2011, when a sellout crowd saw Notre Dame defeat Rensselaer 5–2.

The new ice arena is located south of the Joyce Center, just north of Edison Road, and just west of where the new Irish track and field facility is being constructed. The majority of the general public arena seating is of the chair-back variety with bleacher seating in the student section. The Compton Family Center replaced the rink inside the Edmund P. Joyce Center. During the time that the Irish played at the Joyce Center, the facility was the second smallest home rink in the CCHA with a hockey capacity of 2,857. All seats were benchers, and most of the seating consisted of temporary bleachers. In 2007, the Irish compiled an impressive 14–2–2 home record at the Joyce Center.
