= Andrew Peeke =

American ice hockey player (born 1998)

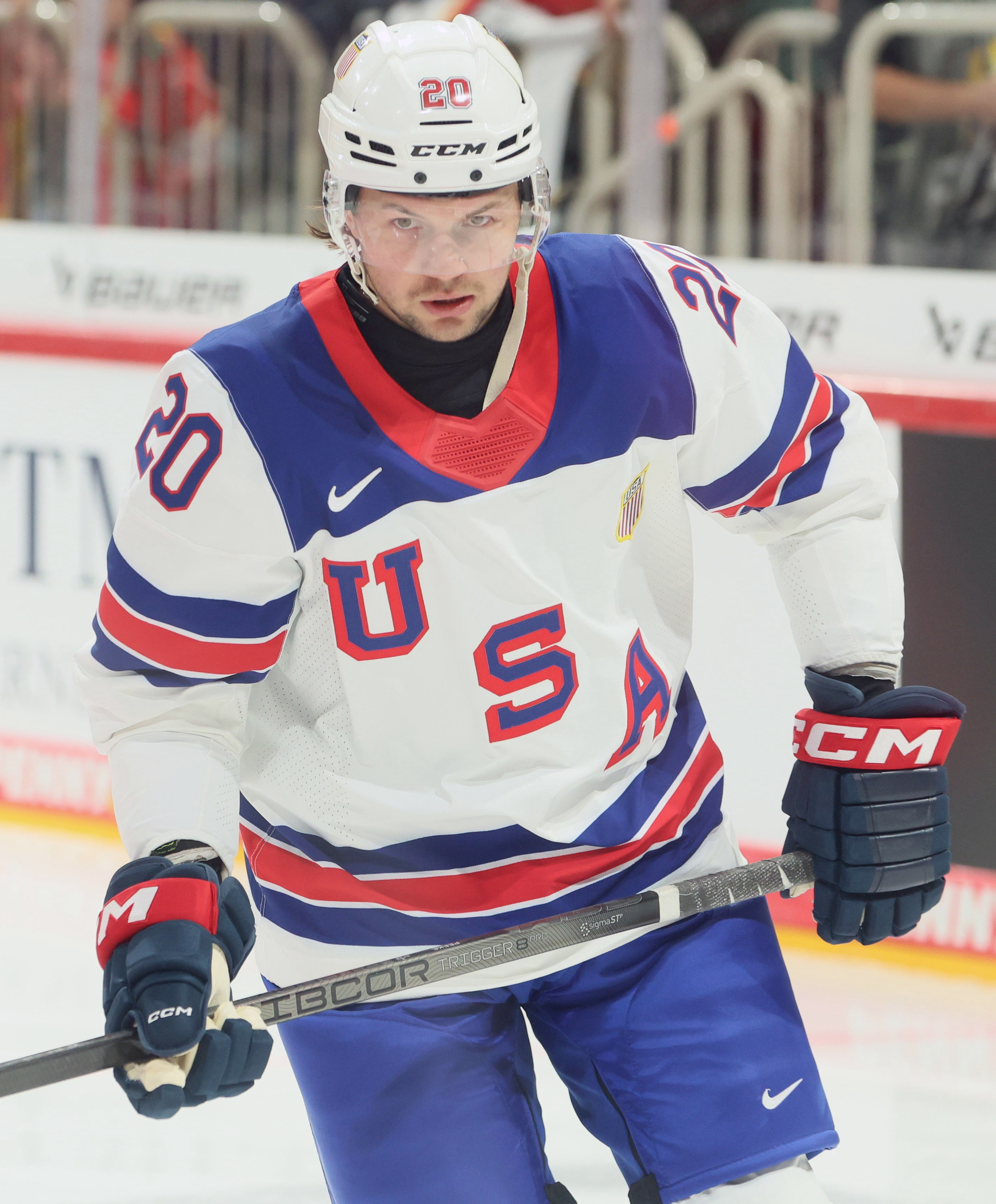
- Peeke with the United States in 2025
- Born: March 17, 1998 (age 28) Parkland, Florida, U.S.
- Height: 6 ft 3 in (191 cm)
- Weight: 214 lb (97 kg; 15 st 4 lb)
- Position: Defense
- Shoots: Right
- NHL team Former teams: Utah Mammoth; Columbus Blue Jackets; Boston Bruins
- National team: United States
- NHL draft: 34th overall, 2016; Columbus Blue Jackets
- Playing career: 2019–present

Andrew Phillip Peeke (born March 17, 1998) is an American professional ice hockey player who is a defenseman for the Utah Mammoth of the National Hockey League (NHL). Peeke was selected 34th overall by the Columbus Blue Jackets in the 2016 NHL entry draft.

== Early life ==
Peeke was born on March 17, 1998, in Parkland, Florida, to parents Mary Ruth and Cliff. He began skating by the age of three and played ice hockey in the Junior Panthers program alongside baseball. Growing up, he was a fan of the Florida Panthers but favored Shea Weber. While playing with the Florida Panthers Alliance program, he helped their Major AAA team win the 2010 Early Bird Tournament Bantam A championship. However, due to the lack of ice hockey opportunities in Florida, Peeke moved to South Kent, Connecticut, when he was 14 to skate with the Selects Hockey Academy.

== Playing career ==
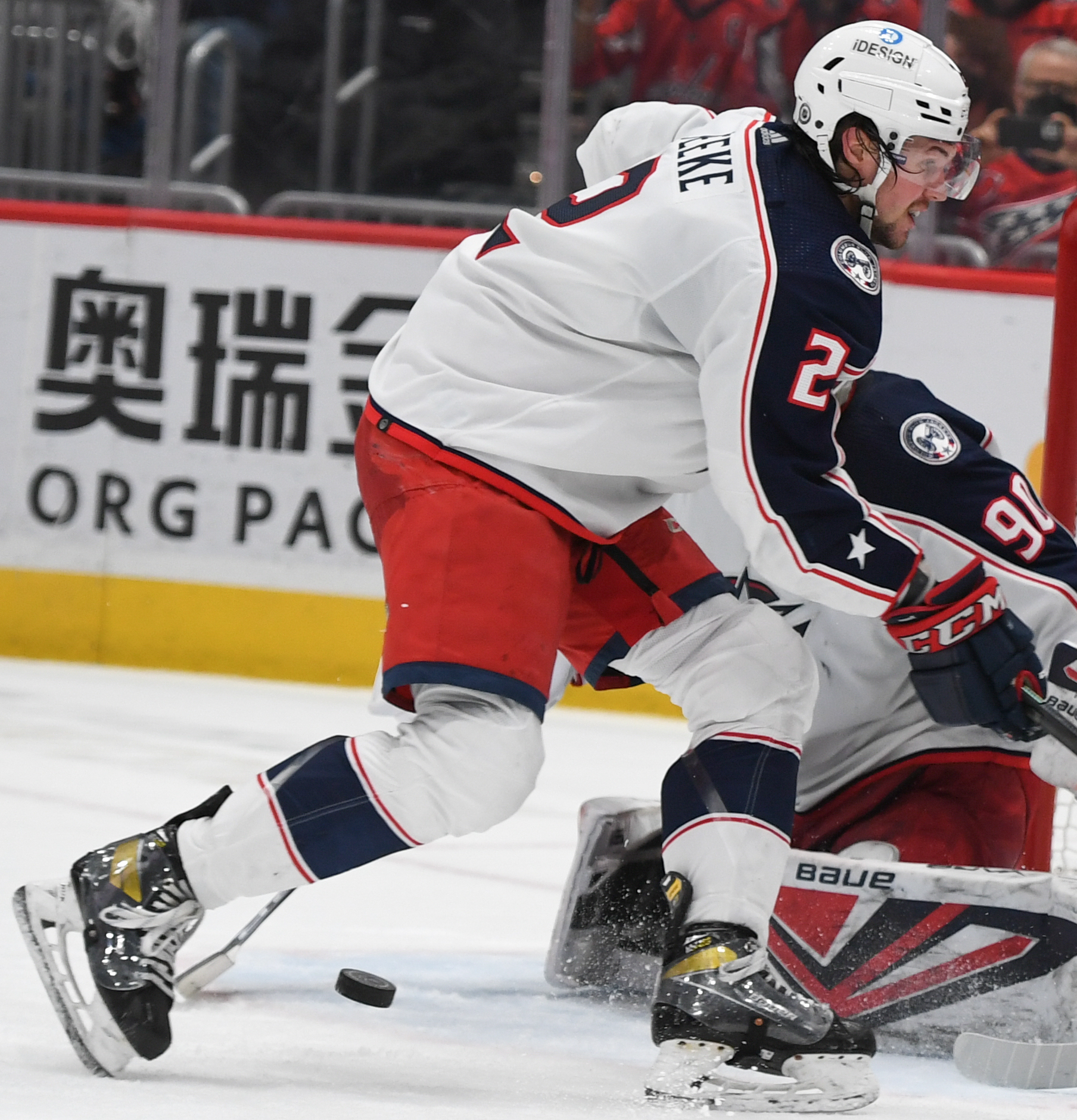
Peeke with the Blue Jackets in 2022.

Peeke played three seasons with the South Kent Prep School (USPHL) before being drafted by the Green Bay Gamblers of the United States Hockey League (USHL) and finishing his schooling at Ashwaubenon High School. During his time in the USPHL, he was named their Defensive Player of the Year and committed to play NCAA Division I ice hockey with the Notre Dame Fighting Irish men's ice hockey team. Upon joining the Gamblers for their 2015–16 season, he became their youngest defenseman on the roster at the age of 17. Peeke played one season with the Gamblers, during which he recorded four goals and 26 assists for 30 points through 56 games. He also finished the season being named to the 2016 recipient of the USHL Scholar-Athlete Award and USHL All-Academic Team.

=== Collegiate ===
Peeke played for the Notre Dame Fighting Irish men's ice hockey team for three seasons while majoring in management consulting. Prior to joining the team, he was drafted 34th overall by the Columbus Blue Jackets in the 2016 NHL entry draft, becoming the 13th American selected in the draft. Upon joining the Fighting Irish for the 2016–17 season, Peeke recorded 14 points in 40 games as the program transitioned from the Hockey East to Big Ten Conference. Before and during his rookie season, Peeke was encouraged by Blue Jackets management to work on his skating, shot, and release. Following his rookie season, he earned praise from the Jackets development coach Chris Clark for exceeding their expectations.

He returned to the Fighting Irish the following season for his sophomore campaign, where he set a new career-high in goals scored with five. Peeke served as captain for the Notre Dame Fighting Irish men's ice hockey team during the 2018–19 season.

=== Professional ===
Following his junior season with Notre Dame, Peeke was signed to a three-year, entry-level contract with the Columbus Blue Jackets on April 1, 2019. He scored his first career goal on February 16, 2020, against the New Jersey Devils. On August 9, 2021, Peeke signed a two-year, $1.575 million contract extension to remain with the Blue Jackets.

On March 8, 2024, the Blue Jackets traded Peeke to the Boston Bruins in exchange for Jakub Zbořil and a 2027 third-round pick.

Peeke provided a stable force on Boston's blue line with his physicality. Peeke scored his first point as a Bruin in his second game with the team, an assist on a John Beecher goal against the Philadelphia Flyers on March 16, 2024. Peeke was injured in Game 2 of the first round of the 2024 Stanley Cup playoffs against the Toronto Maple Leafs. Peeke would end up missing the rest of the series, but the Bruins beat the Leafs in seven games, and Peeke would return to the Boston lineup in Game 3 of their second round matchup against the Florida Panthers.

Peeke entered the 2024–25 season on the Bruins opening night roster, and provided a steady defensive force on Boston's third line pairing. On November 5, 2024 Peeke left a game against the Toronto Maple Leafs early after suffering an upper-body injury after a hit from Max Pacioretty. The injury would keep him out for two weeks, before he returned to the lineup on November 18. On January 14, 2025, Peeke scored his first goal as a Bruin, an empty net goal against the Tampa Bay Lightning. With Bruins top defensemen Charlie McAvoy and Hampus Lindholm out due to injury, Peeke stepped into a bigger role on the Bruins blue line, providing solid a defensive presence while holding his own offensively. This role would only expand after the flailing Bruins traded Brandon Carlo at the trade deadline, making Peeke a top-pairing defensemen for most of the rest of the season. Although the Bruins season did not turn out as hoped, as they missed the playoffs, Peeke scored a career high 16 assists, and with his one goal, scored a career high 17 points.

On July 3, 2026, Peeke, as a free agent from the Bruins, signed a one-year, $1 million contract with the Utah Mammoth for the 2026–27 season.

== International play ==
Medal record

Representing United States

Ice hockey

World Championships
Gold medal – first place	2025 Sweden/Denmark	

World Junior Championships
Bronze medal – third place	2018 United States	

Peeke has represented the United States on multiple occasions, both at the junior and senior level.

Peeke was part of the U.S. men's junior team that won a bronze medal at the 2018 World Junior Ice Hockey Championships. He scored a goal and an assist in the tournament, both in a 9-0 rout of Denmark.

Peeke made his senior national team debut for the United States at the 2022 IIHF World Championship, where they would lose in the bronze medal game. He again represented the United States at the 2025 IIHF World Championship, where he recorded one goal and two assists in ten games and helped Team USA win their first gold medal since 1933.

== Career statistics ==
=== Regular season and playoffs ===
			Regular season					Playoffs
Season	Team	League	GP	G	A	Pts	PIM	GP	G	A	Pts	PIM
2014–15	Selects Academy 18U AAA	USPHL	28	8	12	20	8	4	1	1	2	2
2015–16	Green Bay Gamblers	USHL	56	4	26	30	30	4	1	1	2	2
2016–17	University of Notre Dame	HE	40	4	10	14	16	—	—	—	—	—
2017–18	University of Notre Dame	B1G	39	5	9	14	22	—	—	—	—	—
2018–19	University of Notre Dame	B1G	40	3	21	24	24	—	—	—	—	—
2019–20	Cleveland Monsters	AHL	29	5	11	16	6	—	—	—	—	—
2019–20	Columbus Blue Jackets	NHL	22	1	2	3	4	—	—	—	—	—
2020–21	Columbus Blue Jackets	NHL	11	0	3	3	4	—	—	—	—	—
2020–21	Cleveland Monsters	AHL	7	0	4	4	2	—	—	—	—	—
2021–22	Columbus Blue Jackets	NHL	82	2	13	15	60	—	—	—	—	—
2022–23	Columbus Blue Jackets	NHL	80	6	7	13	22	—	—	—	—	—
2023–24	Columbus Blue Jackets	NHL	23	1	7	8	6	—	—	—	—	—
2023–24	Boston Bruins	NHL	15	0	2	2	8	6	0	0	0	2
2024–25	Boston Bruins	NHL	76	1	16	17	15	—	—	—	—	—
2025–26	Boston Bruins	NHL	77	5	9	14	22	6	0	1	1	14
NHL totals			386	16	59	75	141	12	0	1	1	16

=== International ===
Year	Team	Event	Result	GP	G	A	Pts	PIM
2015	United States	IH18	5th	4	0	1	1	4
2018	United States	WJC	3rd place, bronze medalist(s)	7	1	1	2	2
2022	United States	WC	4th	10	0	6	6	8
2025	United States	WC	1st place, gold medalist(s)	10	1	2	3	4
Junior totals				11	1	2	3	6
Senior totals				20	1	8	9	12

== Awards and honours ==
Award	Year	Ref
USHL
All-Rookie Team	2016	
Scholar-Athlete Award	2016	
College
Hockey East All-Rookie Team	2017	
Big Ten All-Tournament Team	2019	
