= Jamie Ling =

Canadian ice hockey player

- Born: February 22, 1973 (age 53) Charlottetown, PEI, Canada
- Height: 5 ft 11 in (180 cm)
- Weight: 190 lb (86 kg; 13 st 8 lb)
- Position: Centre
- Shot: Left
- Played for: AHL; Hershey Bears; Cleveland Barons; IHL; Milwaukee Admirals; Cincinnati Cyclones; Indianapolis Ice; Kansas City Blades; ECHL; Mobile Mysticks; Baton Rouge Kingfish; Chesapeake Icebreakers; Dayton Bombers
- NHL draft: Undrafted
- Playing career: 1996–2008

Jamie Ling (born February 22, 1973) is a Canadian former professional ice hockey player.

Prior to turning professional, Ling attended the University of Notre Dame where he played four seasons of NCAA Division I college hockey with the Notre Dame Fighting Irish men's ice hockey team. As a freshman, Ling led the 1992–93 Fighting Irish team in scoring with 40 points in his rookie season.

== Career statistics ==
			Regular season					Playoffs
Season	Team	League	GP	G	A	Pts	PIM	GP	G	A	Pts	PIM
1990–91	Notre Dame Hounds	SJHL	1	0	0	0	2	—	—	—	—	—
1991–92	Notre Dame Hounds	SJHL	61	35	56	91	94	—	—	—	—	—
1992–93	University of Notre Dame	NCAA	36	14	26	40	30	—	—	—	—	—
1993–94	University of Notre Dame	NCAA	38	13	26	39	51	—	—	—	—	—
1994–95	University of Notre Dame	NCAA	36	12	30	42	49	—	—	—	—	—
1995–96	University of Notre Dame	NCAA	32	12	19	31	32	—	—	—	—	—
1996–97	Milwaukee Admirals	IHL	3	0	0	0	0	—	—	—	—	—
1996–97	Mobile Mysticks	ECHL	66	19	61	80	51	3	0	0	0	2
1996–97	Hershey Bears	AHL	2	0	2	2	2	—	—	—	—	—
1997–98	Baton Rouge Kingfish	ECHL	24	4	12	16	10	—	—	—	—	—
1997–98	Chesapeake Icebreakers	ECHL	47	14	28	42	36	3	0	1	1	0
1998–99	Cincinnati Cyclones	IHL	2	1	2	3	0	—	—	—	—	—
1998–99	Dayton Bombers	ECHL	70	39	56	95	32	4	1	4	5	4
1998–99	Indianapolis Ice	IHL	1	0	1	1	0	—	—	—	—	—
1999–00	Dayton Bombers	ECHL	63	29	57	86	63	3	0	1	1	2
1999–00	Milwaukee Admirals	IHL	1	0	0	0	0	—	—	—	—	—
1999–00	Cincinnati Cyclones	IHL	2	0	0	0	2	—	—	—	—	—
1999–00	Kansas City Blades	IHL	18	3	10	13	10	—	—	—	—	—
2000–01	Dayton Bombers	ECHL	72	26	67	93	40	8	3	5	8	0
2001–02	Dayton Bombers	ECHL	69	19	40	59	34	14	2	8	10	12
2002–03	Dayton Bombers	ECHL	69	19	31	50	73	—	—	—	—	—
2002–03	Cleveland Barons	AHL	4	1	3	4	0	—	—	—	—	—
AHL totals			6	1	5	6	2	—	—	—	—	—
ECHL totals			480	169	352	521	339	35	6	19	25	20
IHL totals			27	4	13	17	12	—	—	—	—	—

== Awards and honours ==
Award	Year
All-CCHA Rookie Team	1992-93
ECHL Sportsmanship Award	1998–99; 1999–2000; 2000–01
ECHL Second All-Star Team	1999–2000
