= Eddie Bumbacco =

Canadian ice hockey player (born 1952)

- Born: January 10, 1952 (age 74) Sault Ste. Marie, Ontario, Canada
- Height: 5 ft 11 in (180 cm)
- Weight: 175 lb (79 kg; 12 st 7 lb)
- Position: Left wing
- Played for: Notre Dame
- NHL draft: 142nd overall, 1972; Montreal Canadiens
- Playing career: 1970–1974

Edward M. Bumbacco is a Canadian retired ice hockey left wing who was an All-American for Notre Dame.

== Career ==
Bumbacco was a hot commodity as a junior player, being selected by the Toronto Marlboros in the 1969 OHA Priority Selection. He decided to remain with his junior-B club, the Sault Ste. Marie Greyhounds and produced a fantastic season, scoring at a nearly 3-point-per-game pace. Bumbacco led the Greyhounds to a league championship and was named as the playoff MVP. In the 1970 Memorial Cup Sault Ste. Marie received a bye into the quarterfinal round but were defeated by eventual champion Montreal Junior Canadiens four games to one.

After the season Bumbacco began attending the University of Notre Dame and played four seasons with the varsity hockey team. Bumbacco missed part of his freshman season due to a bout of mononucleosis and then had surgery to repair a separated shoulder in the offseason. Prior to his sophomore season the Fighting Irish joined the WCHA and the team was predictably near the bottom of league standings. Bumbacco did, however, acquit himself well enough to be selected by the Montreal Canadiens in the NHL Draft.

The next year it appeared that Montreal may have made a very shrewd pick when Bumbacco went on a scoring rampage, posting the best offensive season for any Notre Dame player in history. Bumbacco's 90-point season placed him second in the nation and helped Notre Dame finish second in the WCHA. Bumbacco was one of Notre Dame's first two All-Americans (the other being Bill Nyrop) and the Fighting Irish came within a goal of making their first NCAA Tournament appearance. There were high hopes that Notre Dame could contend in Bumbacco's senior season but the winger's point totals were nearly halved and the Irish dropped back to 8th place in the conference.

Bumbacco chose to end his playing career after graduating and he returned to Sault Ste. Marie to work as an executive in the steel industry.

== Personal life ==
Bumbacco's father, Angelo, became the general manager for the Sault Ste. Marie Greyhounds when Eddie was in college. Angelo was instrumental in bringing Wayne Gretzky onto the team and also suggested that the teenage phenom wear the number '99'. Angelo died on October 27, 2020.

== Career statistics ==
=== Regular season and playoffs ===
			Regular Season					Playoffs
Season	Team	League	GP	G	A	Pts	PIM	GP	G	A	Pts	PIM
1967–68	Sault Ste. Marie Greyhounds	NOJHL	17	2	9	11	12	—	—	—	—	—
1968–69	Sault Ste. Marie Greyhounds	NOJHL	48	32	25	57	18	13	4	11	15	2
1969–70	Sault Ste. Marie Greyhounds	NOJHL	44	65	54	119	44	12	19	17	36	8
1970–71	Notre Dame	NCAA	25	15	15	30	10	—	—	—	—	—
1971–72	Notre Dame	WCHA	34	23	27	50	8	—	—	—	—	—
1972–73	Notre Dame	WCHA	38	43	47	90	38	—	—	—	—	—
1973–74	Notre Dame	WCHA	36	22	28	50	15	—	—	—	—	—
NOJHL Totals			109	99	88	187	74	25	23	28	51	10
NCAA Totals			133	103	117	220	71	—	—	—	—	—

== Awards and honors ==
Award	Year
All-WCHA First Team	1972–73
AHCA West All-American	1972–73
