= Brian Walsh (ice hockey) =

American ice hockey player (born 1954)

- Born: November 6, 1954 (age 71) Cambridge, Massachusetts, U.S.
- Height: 5 ft 8 in (173 cm)
- Weight: 175 lb (79 kg; 12 st 7 lb)
- Position: Center
- Shot: Right
- Played for: Calgary Cowboys
- NHL draft: Undrafted
- WHA draft: 102nd overall, 1974; New England Whalers
- Playing career: 1976–1979

Brian Walsh (Born November 6, 1954) is an American retired professional ice hockey player.

== Early life ==
Walsh was born in Cambridge, Massachusetts. He played hockey at Matignon High School and became a star on the Notre Dame Fighting Irish men's ice hockey team, where he is the all-time leading scorer. Walsh also was a first-team All-American.

== Career ==
After leaving the University of Notre Dame, Walsh played five games in the World Hockey Association with the Calgary Cowboys during the 1976–77 WHA season. Walsh later played for the San Francisco Shamrocks and Cape Cod Freedoms before retiring.

== Career statistics ==
=== Regular season and playoffs ===
			Regular season					Playoffs
Season	Team	League	GP	G	A	Pts	PIM	GP	G	A	Pts	PIM
1973–74	Notre Dame	WCHA	29	17	16	33	40	—	—	—	—	—
1974–75	Notre Dame	WCHA	37	24	34	58	91	—	—	—	—	—
1975–76	Notre Dame	WCHA	36	18	47	65	72	—	—	—	—	—
1976–77	Notre Dame	WCHA	34	28	41	69	58	—	—	—	—	—
1976–77	Calgary Cowboys	WHA	5	0	2	2	12	—	—	—	—	—
1978–79	San Francisco Shamrocks	PHL	20	8	10	18	19	—	—	—	—	—
1978–79	New Hampshire/Cape Cod Freedoms	NEHL	15	8	12	20	12	—	—	—	—	—
WHA totals			5	0	2	2	12	—	—	—	—	—

== Awards and honors ==
Award	Year
All-WCHA First Team	1976–77
AHCA West All-American	1976–77

Awards and achievements
Preceded by Mike Zuke	WCHA Freshman of the Year; 1973–74	Succeeded by Jim Warner
Preceded by Mike Zuke	WCHA Most Valuable Player; 1976–77	Succeeded by Mike Eaves
