= Phil Wittliff =

American ice hockey player, coach, and executive

- Born: May 1, 1948 (age 77); Port Huron, Michigan, US
- Height: 6 ft 2 in (188 cm)
- Weight: 194 lb (88 kg; 13 st 12 lb)
- Position: Centre
- Shot: Left
- Played for: Jersey Devils (EHL); Port Huron Wings (IHL); Milwaukee Admirals (USHL)
- NHL draft: Undrafted
- Playing career: 1971–1977

Phil Wittliff (born May 1, 1948) is an American former ice hockey player, coach, and executive. Known affectionately as "Mr. Admiral", Wittlifff was involved with the Milwaukee Admirals from his days as a player starting with the 1972–73 season, until his retirement in July 2006 when he stepped away from his role as General Manager and Executive Vice President of Hockey Operations.

== Early life ==
Wittliff was born on May 1, 1948, in Port Huron, Michigan. While he was born in the United States, Wittliff's mother is of Canadian descent. Wittliff was raised alongside five siblings and played football, baseball, and ice hockey growing up. Both Wittliff and his brother Frank played within the Port Huron Hockey Association as youth. By the age of 12, Wittliff was playing bantam hockey, Tight end for his junior high football team, and shortstop for his Little League team.

== High school and collegiate career ==
Wittliff joined the Port Huron Catholic High School's varsity football team as a quarterback in his sophomore year. He helped lead the Warriors to back-to-back St. Clair Area League Championships and led the Blue Water Area in scoring with 19 touchdowns and one extra point as a senior. As such, he was also named to The Times Herald All-Blue Water Area Class B Football Team in his senior year. Outside of school, Wittliff competed with the C. Jerry Beefeaters in the Shamrock Junior "C" Hockey League.

Wittliff received a football scholarship to compete with the Notre Dame Fighting Irish football team under head coach Ara Parseghian. He played linebacker as a freshman but required knee surgery in his sophomore season. His football career continued to be limited by injuries over two seasons before he requested a switch to Notre Dame's fledgling Division I independent ice hockey team. Due to his injuries, Wittliff was granted an extra year of collegiate eligibility.

== Professional career ==
After graduating from Notre Dame in 1971, Wittliff attended the Philadelphia Flyers training camp. He spent three weeks with the Flyers and played in three exhibition games for their American Hockey League (AHL) affiliate, the Richmond Robins. However, he wished to gain more playing time and received permission from the Flyers to sign with the Port Huron Wings of the International Hockey League (IHL). He began the 1971–72 season with the Wings but was demoted to the Eastern Hockey League (EHL) due to his poor skating abilities. He scored a hat-trick in his first game with the EHL's Jersey Devils and recorded eight points over his next 12 contests. However, he was cut from the Devils due to money issues and returned to the Wings.

Wittliff signed a professional contract with the Chicago Cougars of the World Hockey Association on September 22, 1972, but failed to make their 1972–73 season roster. After being cut from the Cougars, Wittliff joined the Milwaukee Admirals in the United States Hockey League (USHL). By December 1973, Wittliff led the team with 10 goals and 21 points. He finished the season setting franchise records in goals, assists, and points and was named the USHL Rookie of the Year. He signed a contract extension to remain with the Admirals in September 1973.

== Coaching and executive career ==
Wittliff retired from professional hockey in 1977 and accepted a full-time position as a publicist for the Admirals. He remained in this role for one year before being promoted to assistant general manager. He succeeded Richard Jamieson as head coach of the Admirals on December 12, 1979, and led the team to its first win in six games. Nelson Leclair was subsequently named head coach for the 1980–81 season but was replaced by Wittliff in February 1981 for the remainder of the IHL season. At the time, the Admirals held a losing 18–27-9 record and had just snapped a seven-game losing streak.

In January 1988, Wittliff suffered severe injuries after colliding with a truck on U.S. Route 8 and U.S. Route 51. Wittliff suffered a ruptured aorta, a punctured lung, crushed ribs and a broken clavicle, among other injuries.

Wittliff resigned as the Admirals' executive vice-president and general manager on July 20, 2006.

== Personal life ==
Wittliff and his wife have two children together.
