= Greg Meredith =

Canadian ice hockey player

- Born: February 23, 1958 (age 68) Toronto, Ontario, Canada
- Height: 6 ft 1 in (185 cm)
- Weight: 210 lb (95 kg; 15 st 0 lb)
- Position: Right wing
- Shot: Right
- Played for: Calgary Flames
- NHL draft: 97th overall, 1978; Atlanta Flames
- Playing career: 1980–1984

Gregory Paul Meredith (born February 23, 1958) is a Canadian former professional ice hockey player. He played 38 games in the National Hockey League with the Calgary Flames during the 1980–81 and 1982–83 seasons.

== Biography ==
As a youth, Meredith played in the 1971 Quebec International Pee-Wee Hockey Tournament with a minor ice hockey team from Toronto.

A finalist for the Rhodes Scholarship, Meredith attended the University of Notre Dame, where he set the Notre Dame all-time goals record, with 104.

Meredith was a sixth-round selection, 97th overall by the Atlanta Flames in the 1978 NHL entry draft. He then played 43 games in the National Hockey League for the Calgary Flames in 1980–81 and 1982–83, recording six goals and four assists in the regular season, and three goals and one assist in five playoff games. He retired following the 1983–84 season.

After a knee injury ended his hockey career, Meredith attended business school at Harvard University, where he was a volunteer assistant ice hockey coach. Meredith won the NCAA Silver Anniversary Award in 2005 for prominence as a student-athlete and success in business. He was the tenth Notre Dame graduate to win the award. In 2004, Meredith worked as the managing director for Putnam Lovell NBF Securities Inc.

== Career statistics ==
=== Regular season and playoffs ===
			Regular season					Playoffs
Season	Team	League	GP	G	A	Pts	PIM	GP	G	A	Pts	PIM
1975–76	Toronto Marlboros	OMJHL	5	0	0	0	0	—	—	—	—	—
1975–76	Upper Canada College	CISAA	—	—	—	—	—	—	—	—	—	—
1976–77	University of Notre Dame	WCHA	38	23	22	45	20	—	—	—	—	—
1977–78	University of Notre Dame	WCHA	38	13	13	26	24	—	—	—	—	—
1978–79	University of Notre Dame	WCHA	35	28	22	50	14	—	—	—	—	—
1979–80	University of Notre Dame	WCHA	40	40	31	71	14	—	—	—	—	—
1980–81	Calgary Flames	NHL	3	1	0	1	0	—	—	—	—	—
1980–81	Birmingham Bullds	CHL	39	17	10	27	36	—	—	—	—	—
1980–81	Tulsa Oilers	CHL	10	6	4	10	12	—	—	—	—	—
1981–82	Oklahoma City Stars	CHL	80	10	23	33	64	4	2	0	2	6
1982–83	Calgary Flames	NHL	35	5	4	9	8	5	3	1	4	4
1982–83	Colorado Flames	CHL	36	16	10	26	14	—	—	—	—	—
1983–84	Colorado Flames	CHL	54	23	20	43	39	6	1	2	3	9
CHL totals			219	72	67	139	165	10	3	2	5	15
NHL totals			38	6	4	10	8	5	3	1	4	4

== Awards and honours ==
Award	Year
All-WCHA First Team	1979–80
AHCA West All-American	1979–80
