= Clark Hamilton (ice hockey) =

Canadian ice hockey player (1955–2022)

Clark Ian Hamilton
- Born: January 12, 1955 (age 70); Los Angeles, California, U.S.
- Died: August 19, 2022 (aged 67); Plano, Texas, U.S.
- Height: 6 ft 3 in (191 cm)
- Weight: 190 lb (86 kg; 13 st 8 lb)
- Position: Centre
- Shot: Left
- Played for: Kansas City Red Wings (CHL); Cincinnati Stingers (CHL); Erie Blades (EHL)
- National team: United States
- NHL draft: 50th overall, 1975; Detroit Red Wings
- WHA draft: 32nd overall, 1975; Indianapolis Racers
- Playing career: 1977–1980

Clark Hamilton (January 12, 1955 – August 19, 2022) was a Canadian-American former professional ice hockey player.

== Early life ==
Hamilton was born in Los Angeles and raised in Etobicoke, Ontario. Prior to becoming a professional hockey player, Hamilton played four seasons with the Notre Dame Fighting Irish men's ice hockey team.

== Career ==
Hamilton was selected in the third round by the Detroit Red Wings in the 1975 NHL Amateur Draft and the third round by the Indianapolis Racers in the 1975 WHA Amateur Draft.

As a professional, Hamilton played 97 games in the CHL with the Kansas City Red Wings (1977–79) and Cincinnati Stingers (1979–80). Hamilton also played 40 games in the EHL with the Erie Blades during the 1979–80 season.

== Personal life ==
Hamilton died in Plano, Texas, on August 19, 2022.
