= Mike McNeill (ice hockey) =

American ice hockey player

- Born: July 22, 1966 (age 60) Winona, Minnesota, U.S.
- Height: 6 ft 1 in (185 cm)
- Weight: 185 lb (84 kg; 13 st 3 lb)
- Position: Left wing
- Shot: Right
- Played for: Chicago Blackhawks; Quebec Nordiques; Revier Löwen Oberhausen
- National team: United States
- NHL draft: 1988 NHL Supplemental Draft; St. Louis Blues
- Playing career: 1988–2000

Michael McNeill (born July 22, 1966) is an American former professional ice hockey player who played 63 games in the National Hockey League (NHL) with the Chicago Blackhawks and Quebec Nordiques between 1990 and 1992. The rest of his career, which lasted from 1988 to 2000, was mainly spent in the minor leagues. Internationally McNeill played for the American national team at the 1991 World Championships.

== Biography ==
McNeil was born in Winona, Minnesota and raised in South Bend, Indiana.

McNeil played football, hockey and baseball in high school from 1980 to 1984 before joining the Notre Dame Fighting Irish for four years. While playing for Notre Dame, he served as team captain.

In 2000, McNeill suffered a career-ending eye injury while playing for the Revier Löwen Oberhausen in Germany.

In 2008, McNeill served as a volunteer assistant coach for the University of Notre Dame. Since 2011, McNeill has served as the programming and instruction program manager for the Notre Dame's Compton Family Ice Arena.

== Personal life ==
McNeill's father Tim worked as an assistant coach for Notre Dame's hockey program. He grew up playing in the local IYHL (Irish Youth Hockey League), and he played at the local high school Saint Joseph, playing football, baseball, and of course hockey. He previously coached the Irish Rovers 14u AA team and the Saint Joseph high school hockey team (2023–2026).

== Career statistics ==
=== Regular season and playoffs ===
| | | | Regular season | | | | | Playoffs |
| Season | Team | League | GP | G | A | Pts | PIM | GP | G | A | Pts | PIM |
|---|---|---|---|---|---|---|---|---|---|---|---|---|
| 1980–84 | South Bend, IN | | — | — | — | — | — | — | — | — | — | — |
| 1984–85 | University of Notre Dame | NCAA | 28 | 16 | 26 | 42 | 12 | — | — | — | — | — |
| 1985–86 | University of Notre Dame | NCAA | 34 | 18 | 29 | 47 | 32 | — | — | — | — | — |
| 1986–87 | University of Notre Dame | NCAA | 30 | 21 | 16 | 37 | 24 | — | — | — | — | — |
| 1987–88 | University of Notre Dame | NCAA | 32 | 28 | 44 | 72 | 12 | — | — | — | — | — |
| 1988–89 | Moncton Hawks | AHL | 1 | 0 | 0 | 0 | 0 | — | — | — | — | — |
| 1988–89 | Fort Wayne Komets | IHL | 75 | 27 | 35 | 62 | 12 | 11 | 1 | 5 | 6 | 2 |
| 1989–90 | Indianapolis Ice | IHL | 74 | 17 | 24 | 41 | 10 | 14 | 6 | 4 | 10 | 21 |
| 1990–91 | Chicago Blackhawks | NHL | 23 | 2 | 2 | 4 | 6 | — | — | — | — | — |
| 1990–91 | Quebec Nordiques | NHL | 14 | 2 | 5 | 7 | 4 | — | — | — | — | — |
| 1990–91 | Indianapolis Ice | IHL | 33 | 16 | 9 | 25 | 19 | — | — | — | — | — |
| 1991–92 | Quebec Nordiques | NHL | 26 | 1 | 4 | 5 | 8 | — | — | — | — | — |
| 1991–92 | Halifax Citadels | AHL | 30 | 10 | 8 | 18 | 20 | — | — | — | — | — |
| 1992–93 | Milwaukee Admirals | IHL | 75 | 17 | 17 | 34 | 34 | 6 | 2 | 0 | 2 | 0 |
| 1993–94 | Milwaukee Admirals | IHL | 78 | 21 | 25 | 46 | 40 | 4 | 0 | 1 | 1 | 6 |
| 1994–95 | Milwaukee Admirals | IHL | 80 | 23 | 15 | 38 | 30 | 15 | 2 | 2 | 4 | 14 |
| 1995–96 | Milwaukee Admirals | IHL | 64 | 8 | 9 | 17 | 32 | 5 | 2 | 0 | 2 | 2 |
| 1996–97 | Milwaukee Admirals | IHL | 74 | 18 | 26 | 44 | 24 | 3 | 0 | 1 | 1 | 0 |
| 1997–98 | Milwaukee Admirals | IHL | 81 | 10 | 18 | 28 | 58 | 10 | 2 | 1 | 3 | 12 |
| 1998–99 | Revier Löwen Oberhausen | DEL | 47 | 8 | 16 | 24 | 10 | — | — | — | — | — |
| 1999–00 | Revier Löwen Oberhausen | DEL | 22 | 1 | 7 | 8 | 6 | — | — | — | — | — |
| IHL totals | | | 634 | 157 | 178 | 335 | 259 | 68 | 15 | 14 | 29 | 57 |
| NHL totals | | | 63 | 5 | 11 | 16 | 18 | — | — | — | — | — |

=== International ===
| Year | Team | Event | GP | G | A | Pts | PIM |
|---|---|---|---|---|---|---|---|
| 1991 | United States | WC | 10 | 1 | 0 | 1 | 4 |
| Senior totals | | | 10 | 1 | 0 | 1 | 4 |
