= Jordan Gross (ice hockey) =

American ice hockey player (born 1995)

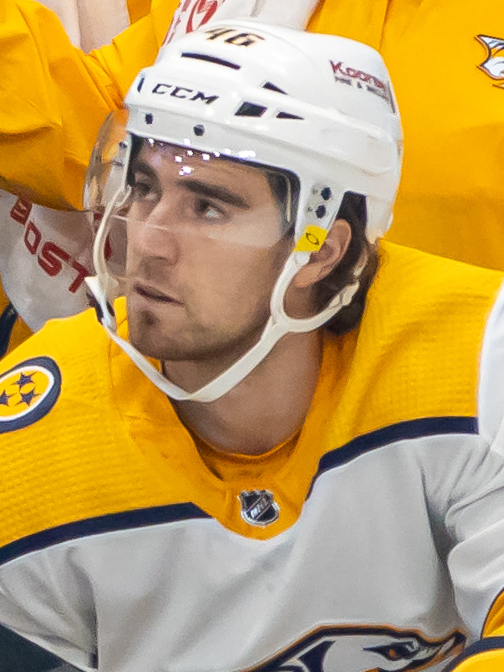
- Gross playing with the Nashville Predators in 2022
- Born: May 9, 1995 (age 31) Maple Grove, Minnesota, U.S.
- Height: 5 ft 10 in (178 cm)
- Weight: 190 lb (86 kg; 13 st 8 lb)
- Position: Defense
- Shoots: Right
- KHL team Former teams: Avtomobilist Yekaterinburg; Arizona Coyotes; Colorado Avalanche; Nashville Predators; Dinamo Minsk; Traktor Chelyabinsk
- NHL draft: Undrafted
- Playing career: 2018–present

Jordan Hunter Gross (born May 9, 1995) is an American professional ice hockey defenseman who is currently playing for Avtomobilist Yekaterinburg in the Kontinental Hockey League (KHL). He has formerly played with the Arizona Coyotes, Colorado Avalanche and the Nashville Predators in the National Hockey League (NHL).

== Playing career ==
=== Amateur ===
Gross played school hockey in Minnesota with Maple Grove High School before playing junior in the United States Hockey League (USHL) with the Green Bay Gamblers. Undrafted, Gross committed to collegiate hockey with the University of Notre Dame, beginning as a freshman in the 2014–15 season.

In his senior season with the Fighting Irish and although under-sized Gross developed into one of the top defenseman in the NCAA. In the 2017–18 season, Gross registered 10 goals and 30 points in 40 games, ranking third on Notre Dame in scoring and led all Fighting Irish defensemen in points. Gross helped the Fighting Irish advance to the Frozen Four championship game where he was named to the NCAA (Championship) All-Tournament Team and later the Big Ten Conference First All-Star Team.

=== Professional ===
==== Arizona Coyotes ====
As a free agent, Gross attracted NHL interest, opting to sign a two-year, entry-level contract with the Arizona Coyotes on April 12, 2018. He immediately joined the Coyotes' AHL affiliate, the Tucson Roadrunners, on an amateur try-out, making his professional debut in a solitary appearance and registering 2 assists to end the regular season, in a 6-3 victory over the San Diego Gulls on April 14, 2018.

In the following 2019–20 season, Gross was assigned to continue his development with the Roadrunners in the AHL, before he was recalled by the Coyotes on December 22, 2019, and made his NHL debut for the Coyotes against the Detroit Red Wings and scored his first NHL point with an assist on the Coyotes' fifth goal. Returning to the Roadrunners following two games, Gross tied for first among Tucson defensemen with 10 goals and finished second with 27 points while appearing in 56 contests.

On October 10, 2020, as a restricted free agent, Gross was signed to a one-year, two-way contract extension with the Arizona Coyotes. In the pandemic delayed 2020–21 season, Gross spent the majority of the season on the Coyotes extended taxi squad. On April 2, 2021, Gross registered a career-high 3 assists against the Anaheim Ducks, the most tallied by a Coyotes rookie defenseman in a single game since Keith Ballard in 2006. Gross finished with 3 points through 7 games before missing the final 14 games of the shortened season due to a lower body injury.

==== Colorado Avalanche ====
As a free agent from the Coyotes, due to lack of games played at the NHL level, Gross was signed to a one-year, two-way contract with the Colorado Avalanche for the 2021–22 season on July 31, 2021. Assigned to AHL affiliate, the Colorado Eagles following training camp with the Avalanche, Gross was a staple on the blueline, leading all defenseman and tied for the team lead in scoring with 18 points through 21 games before earning his first recall to the Avalanche on December 15, 2021. He made his Avalanche debut the following day, taking two minor penalties in a 5-2 defeat to the Nashville Predators. He was returned to the Eagles following the game, as the Avalanche took a hiatus due to COVID-19. In continuing his break out season with the Eagles, Gross finished the regular season leading the league in scoring on the blueline with 10 goals and 55 assists for 65 points over 61 games, earning selection to the AHL's First All-Star Team. He was awarded the Eddie Shore Award in recognition of his season as the AHL's outstanding defenseman.

==== Nashville Predators ====
As a free agent from the Avalanche, Gross capitalised on his successful season by agreeing to a two-year, $1.525 million contract with the Nashville Predators on July 13, 2022.

==== KHL ====
At the conclusion of his contract with the Predators, Gross as a pending free agent opted to pursue a career abroad, securing a one-year contract with Belarusian outfit, HC Dinamo Minsk of the KHL, on June 28, 2024. In his first season in the Russian based KHL in 2024–25 season, Gross established himself as the top scoring blueliner on Minsk, posting a franchise best 40 points through 66 regular season games. In helping Minsk qualify for the playoffs, Gross added 2 assists through 11 appearances.

As a free agent, Gross capitalized on his successful season in signing a lucrative one-year contract with Gagarin Cup finalists, Traktor Chelyabinsk, for the 2025–26 season on June 6, 2025. Gross replicated his offensive output with Traktor, posting 8 goals and 35 points through 64 regular season games.

Gross left Traktor at the conclusion of his contract, and joined his third KHL club in as many seasons after agreeing to a two-year deal with Avtomobilist Yekaterinburg on June 5, 2026.

== Career statistics ==
			Regular season					Playoffs
Season	Team	League	GP	G	A	Pts	PIM	GP	G	A	Pts	PIM
2010–11	Maple Grove High	USHS	25	6	18	24	8	3	2	4	6	4
2011–12	Maple Grove High	USHS	25	15	24	39	27	3	2	5	7	2
2011–12	Green Bay Gamblers	USHL	6	2	0	2	0	—	—	—	—	—
2012–13	Green Bay Gamblers	USHL	64	7	24	31	12	4	0	1	1	2
2013–14	Green Bay Gamblers	USHL	50	2	23	25	31	4	0	2	2	6
2014–15	Notre Dame	HE	42	7	21	28	14	—	—	—	—	—
2015–16	Notre Dame	HE	37	9	22	31	30	—	—	—	—	—
2016–17	Notre Dame	HE	40	10	22	32	12	—	—	—	—	—
2017–18	Notre Dame	B1G	40	10	20	30	26	—	—	—	—	—
2017–18	Tucson Roadrunners	AHL	1	0	2	2	0	—	—	—	—	—
2018–19	Tucson Roadrunners	AHL	61	5	20	25	28	—	—	—	—	—
2019–20	Tucson Roadrunners	AHL	56	10	17	27	14	—	—	—	—	—
2019–20	Arizona Coyotes	NHL	2	0	1	1	0	—	—	—	—	—
2020–21	Arizona Coyotes	NHL	7	0	3	3	2	—	—	—	—	—
2021–22	Colorado Eagles	AHL	61	10	55	65	44	9	1	9	10	6
2021–22	Colorado Avalanche	NHL	1	0	0	0	4	—	—	—	—	—
2022–23	Milwaukee Admirals	AHL	53	10	28	38	36	11	2	9	11	6
2022–23	Nashville Predators	NHL	15	3	0	3	2	—	—	—	—	—
2023–24	Milwaukee Admirals	AHL	42	6	16	22	24	12	0	1	1	2
2024–25	Dinamo Minsk	KHL	66	7	33	40	8	11	0	2	2	0
2025–26	Traktor Chelyabinsk	KHL	64	8	27	35	20	5	0	2	2	0
NHL totals			25	3	4	7	8	—	—	—	—	—
KHL totals			130	15	60	75	28	16	0	4	4	0

== Awards and honors ==
Award	Year
USHL
USHL/NHL Top Prospects Game	2013
College
HE Second All-Star Team	2016
HE Honorable Mention All-Star Team	2017
Big Ten All-Tournament Team	2018
All-Big Ten First Team	2018
NCAA East Regional MVP/Tournament Team	2018
NCAA Frozen Four All Tournament Team	2018
AHL
First All-Star Team	2022
Eddie Shore Award	2022
