= Erik Condra =

American professional ice hockey forward

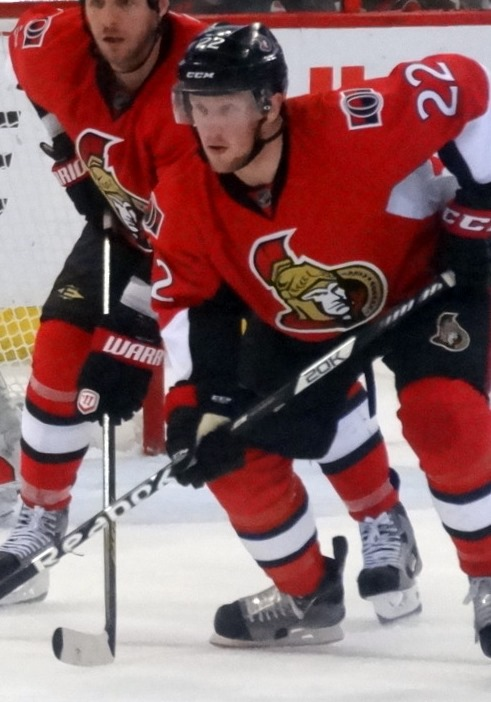
- Condra (right) with the Ottawa Senators during the 2013 Stanley Cup playoffs
- Born: August 6, 1986 (age 40) Trenton, Michigan, U.S.
- Height: 6 ft 0 in (183 cm)
- Weight: 188 lb (85 kg; 13 st 6 lb)
- Position: Right wing
- Shot: Right
- Played for: Ottawa Senators; SC Riessersee; Tampa Bay Lightning; Dallas Stars
- NHL draft: 211th overall, 2006; Ottawa Senators
- Playing career: 2009–2020

Erik Paul Condra (born August 6, 1986) is an American former professional ice hockey forward who played in 372 National Hockey League (NHL) games with the Ottawa Senators, Tampa Bay Lightning, and Dallas Stars. He is currently a player development coach with the Chicago Blackhawks. Condra played for the University of Notre Dame in the CCHA. Condra was born in Trenton, Michigan, but grew up in Livonia, Michigan.

== Playing career ==
=== Amateur ===
As a youth, Condra played in the 2000 Quebec International Pee-Wee Hockey Tournament with the Detroit Honeybaked minor ice hockey team.

Condra played junior hockey with the Texarkana Bandits of the NAHL in 2003–04, where in 56 games, he scored 20 goals and 44 points to lead the club in points. He moved to the Lincoln Stars of the USHL for the 2004–05 season. In 60 games with Lincoln, Condra tied for the team high with 30 goals, while finishing second on the club with 60 points, helping the Stars to a playoff berth. In four post-season games, Condra had two assists.

Condra joined the Notre Dame Fighting Irish of the CCHA for the 2005–06 season. As a freshman, Condra had six goals, and a team high 34 points in 36 games with Notre Dame, and placed him on the All-Rookie team of the CCHA. After the season, the Ottawa Senators drafted Condra with the 211th overall pick in the 2006 NHL entry draft. While at Notre Dame, Condra studied pre-med in psychology.

His offensive numbers improved in the 2006–07, as Condra once again led the Fighting Irish in points, as he scored 14 goals and 48 points in 42 games. In 2007–08, Condra led the team in scoring once again, scoring 15 goals and 38 points in 41 games played. Condra finished his collegiate career in 2008–09, leading Notre Dame in scoring for the fourth consecutive season, as he scored 13 goals and 38 points in 40 games.

=== Professional ===
==== Ottawa Senators ====
After a very successful college career, the Ottawa Senators assigned Condra to their AHL affiliate, the Binghamton Senators for the 2009–10 season. In his first professional season, Condra had 11 goals and 38 points while appearing in all 80 games for the Senators. However, Binghamton failed to reach the playoffs.

Condra began the 2010–11 season with Binghamton, scoring 17 goals and 47 points in 55 games before being called up by the Ottawa Senators. He made his NHL debut on February 15, 2011, recording an assist in a 4–3 shootout loss to the New York Islanders. Condra scored his first NHL goal on February 26, 2011, scoring twice against goaltender Brian Boucher in a 4–1 win over the Philadelphia Flyers. He had another two goal game on March 8, 2011, against Martin Brodeur as Ottawa defeated the New Jersey Devils 2–1. In total, Condra registered six goals and 11 points in 26 games with Ottawa. After Ottawa's season concluded, Condra was sent back to Binghamton for their playoff run, where he scored five goals and 17 points in 23 games, as the Senators won the 2011 Calder Cup.

In his first full NHL season, Condra earned a regular roster spot in Ottawa. Though he struggled offensively at times, he established himself as a dependable defensive forward and recorded 8 goals and 25 points in 81 games.

During the 2012 NHL Lockout, Condra spent time with the Fussen Leopards, a third division club in Germany. After dominating at that level, he moved up to the second-tier league Eishockey-Bundesliga, joining fellow NHLers Matt D'Agostini and Rick DiPietro with SC Riessersee.

==== Tampa Bay Lightning ====
On July 1, 2015, Condra signed a three-year deal with the Tampa Bay Lightning, which has a $1.25 million annual average. Condra had previous ties to Lightning head coach Jon Cooper, who he played for while Cooper was coach of Texarkana of the NAHL. On October 8, 2015, Condra played in his 300th career NHL game in a 3–2 OT Lightning victory over the visiting Philadelphia Flyers. Condra also took part in the first-ever three-on-three regular season overtime game under the new overtime format during that same game.

On March 17, 2017, Condra was named the captain of the Syracuse Crunch. Condra became the 16th full-time captain in Crunch franchise history and the third since Syracuse became the affiliate of the Tampa Bay Lightning in 2012.

==== Dallas Stars ====
After three seasons within the Lightning organization, Condra left as a free agent and agreed to a one-year, two-way contract with the Dallas Stars on July 1, 2018. After attending Dallas' training camp, Condra was placed on waivers and reassigned to AHL affiliate, the Texas Stars to begin the 2018–19 season. As an alternate captain with Texas, Condra added a top-line veteran scoring presence. On January 4, 2019, Condra was recalled by Dallas and appeared in his first NHL game since 2017, in a 2–1 overtime victory over the Washington Capitals. He notched his first goal, providing the Stars only goal in a 3–1 defeat to the St. Louis Blues on January 12, 2019. After 6 games and with the Stars returning to health, Condra was returned for the remainder of the season to Texas. He led the team in regular season scoring with 20 goals and 54 points in 71 games.

==== Colorado Eagles ====
As a free agent from the Stars, Condra agreed to continue his career in the AHL, signing a one-year contract with the Colorado Eagles, affiliate to the Colorado Avalanche, on July 22, 2019. In his final professional season, Condra added a veteran presence to the Eagles while continued his scoring output in registering 16 goals and 35 points in 53 regular season games before the season was cancelled due to the COVID-19 pandemic.

== Coaching career ==
On November 23, 2020, Condra was hired by the Chicago Blackhawks as a player development coach.

== Personal life ==
Condra spent three years at Detroit Catholic Central High School before graduating from Texas High School in Texarkana, Texas.

Condra comes from a family of Notre Dame alumnus; his cousin Anders Bjork, along with his uncle Kirt, played hockey there. Anders was drafted 146th overall by the Boston Bruins in the 2014 NHL entry draft and currently plays for the Buffalo Sabres in the NHL.

== Career statistics ==
			Regular season					Playoffs
Season	Team	League	GP	G	A	Pts	PIM	GP	G	A	Pts	PIM
2002–03	Honeybaked 18U AAA	18U AAA	74	20	64	84	56	—	—	—	—	—
2003–04	Texarkana Bandits	NAHL	56	20	24	44	71	—	—	—	—	—
2004–05	Lincoln Stars	USHL	60	30	30	60	56	4	0	2	2	4
2005–06	Notre Dame University	CCHA	36	6	28	34	32	—	—	—	—	—
2006–07	Notre Dame University	CCHA	42	14	34	48	18	—	—	—	—	—
2007–08	Notre Dame University	CCHA	41	15	23	38	26	—	—	—	—	—
2008–09	Notre Dame University	CCHA	40	13	25	38	34	—	—	—	—	—
2009–10	Binghamton Senators	AHL	80	11	27	38	61	—	—	—	—	—
2010–11	Binghamton Senators	AHL	55	17	30	47	28	23	5	12	17	8
2010–11	Ottawa Senators	NHL	26	6	5	11	12	—	—	—	—	—
2011–12	Ottawa Senators	NHL	81	8	17	25	30	7	1	0	1	0
2012–13	EV Füssen	GER.3	7	8	11	19	2	—	—	—	—	—
2012–13	SC Riessersee	GER.2	10	10	5	15	8	—	—	—	—	—
2012–13	Ottawa Senators	NHL	48	4	8	12	34	10	1	6	7	2
2013–14	Ottawa Senators	NHL	76	6	10	16	30	—	—	—	—	—
2014–15	Ottawa Senators	NHL	68	9	14	23	30	6	1	0	1	0
2015–16	Tampa Bay Lightning	NHL	54	6	5	11	34	3	0	0	0	0
2016–17	Syracuse Crunch	AHL	55	15	33	48	37	18	5	11	16	22
2016–17	Tampa Bay Lightning	NHL	13	0	0	0	4	—	—	—	—	—
2017–18	Syracuse Crunch	AHL	48	9	16	25	57	7	0	5	5	6
2018–19	Texas Stars	AHL	71	20	34	54	64	—	—	—	—	—
2018–19	Dallas Stars	NHL	6	1	0	1	2	—	—	—	—	—
2019–20	Colorado Eagles	AHL	53	16	19	35	56	—	—	—	—	—
NHL totals			372	40	59	99	176	26	3	6	9	2

== Awards and honors ==
Award	Year
College
All-CCHA Rookie Team	2005–06
CCHA All-Tournament Team	2007
All-CCHA Second team	2008–09
AHCA West Second-Team All-American	2008–09
AHL
Calder Cup (Binghamton Senators)	2011

Awards and achievements
Preceded by Dan VeNard	Terry Flanagan Memorial Award; 2008–09	Succeeded by Aaron Lewicki
