= Louisville shooting =

Louisville shooting may refer to:

- Standard Gravure shooting, 1989
- Killing of Breonna Taylor, 2020
  - Breonna Taylor protest shootings, shortly thereafter
- 2023 Louisville bank shooting

== See also ==
- Crime in Louisville, Kentucky
- Louisville Shooters, a basketball team, 1991–1992
- Louisville Shooting Stars, an ice hockey team, 1953–1954
- List of mass shootings in the United States
