= Southern Farm Show =

Trade show in Raleigh, North Carolina, US

- Genre: Agricultural trade show
- Frequency: Annual
- Venue: North Carolina State Fairgrounds
- Coordinates: 35.7960°N 78.7119°W
- Country: United States
- Inaugurated: 1967
- Previous event: 4-6 February 2026
- Next event: 3-5 February 2027
- Attendance: 30,000+
- President: David Zimmerman
- Organiser: Southern Shows Inc.
- Website: southernshows.com

The Southern Farm Show is an annual trade show and exhibition for farmers and related manufacturers that is held annually in Raleigh, North Carolina. The event was established in 1967 in Macon, Georgia, and has been held in February at the North Carolina State Fairgrounds since 1978. It draws an audience of more than 30,000 annually.

== History ==
The Southern Farm Show is an annual agricultural trade show and exhibition that was first held October 25–28, 1967 at the Atlanta Civic Center in Atlanta, Georgia. It was managed by Robert E. Zimmerman of Southeastern Shows Inc. of Charlotte, North Carolina and was sponsored by The Progressive Farmer. Its keynote address was given by Herman Talmadge, United States Senator.

The second annual Southern Farm Show was held in Atlanta on November 12–15, 1968. In November 1969, the trade show was held at the Mid-South Colesium and Fairgrounds in Memphis, Tennessee. The fourth annual Southern Farm Show rotated back to Atlanta in November 1970, and returned to Memphis in November 1971.

In 1971, the Southern Farm Show was held in Macon, Georgia on November 4–6, and in Memphis on November 16–18. Georgia's Governor Jimmy Carter proclaimed that November 1–7, 1971, was Farm Show Week in Georgia. 1971 also marked the introduction of a championship tractor pull to the farm show.

The farm show was held at the Macon Colisium and Exhibit Grounds in Macon on October 19–21, 1972, overlapping with the Georgia State Fair. In December 1972, the Southern Farm Show was a founding member of the national Farm Show Council. The trade show continued to rotate between Macon and Memphis trom 1973 to 1977.

On February 2–4, 1978, the Southern Farm Show moved to the North Carolina State Fairgrounds in Raleigh, North Carolina, where it has remained since. That year, entertainment was provided by farmer and singer Marty Robbins. In 1981, Governor Jim Hunt proclaimed February 1–7 as Farm Show Week, in honor of the trade show.

Initially, the Southern Farm Show only used a portion of the North Carolina State Fairgrounds' buildings. In 1985, it was centered around the Jim Graham Building. Over time, it expanded to include Dorton Arena, the Holshouser Building, the Martin Building, and the Hunt Horse Arena. The event grew from just a few outside exhibits to more than 110 outside exhibits in 2024. In 1996, large tents were added to house some of these exhibits. The fairground's new Exposition Building was added to the event in 2005. The farm show was cancelled in 2021 due to the COVID-19 pandemic.

As of 2024, the Southern Farm Show draws an audience of more than 30,000 people annually, mostly from North Carolina, South Carolina, and Virginia. The Southern Farm Show is organized by Southern Shows Inc., formerly called Southeastern Shows, of Charlotte, North Carolina. David Zimmerman is the president of the Southern Farm Show, joining the event in 1983.

The next Southern Farm Show is scheduled for 3-5 February 2027.

== Exhibits and programming ==
The Southern Farm Show focuses on current and future developments in agriculture. The event includes exhibitions, educational seminars, meetings, and networking opportunities for farmers. The event also includes the Future Farmers of America Tractor and Truck Driving Competition, the Coon Mule Jump, a lumberjack show presented by the South Atlantic Woodsmen's Association, and the Southern National Draft Horse Pull.

The Southern Farm Show features exhibits of farm equipment and supplies from more than 400 suppliers and manufacturers related to agriculture and farming. The products and services covered include agricultural machinery, animal health products, chemicals, fertilizers, filtration systems, forestry equipment, irrigation and drainage systems, land cleaning equipment, landscape equipment, outdoor power equipment, precision agriculture technologies, ventilation systems, and specialized equipment for cotton, peanuts, poultry, and tobacco.

Some years, related organizations hold their annual meetings in conjunction with the Southern Farm Show. For example, the 2025 Southern Farm Show included the North Carolina Growers Association annual meeting, the Tobacco Growers Association of North Carolina annual meeting, the North Carolina Department of Agriculture and Consumer Services' Ag Development Forum, and the "State of North Carolina Agriculture" address by Steve Troxler, North Carolina Commissioner of Agriculture.

== Venue ==
The Southern Farm Show is held at the North Carolina State Fairgrounds on 4285 Trinity Road in Raleigh, North Carolina. The event includes the seven permanent fairground buildings, along with temporary structures and outdoor exhibitions.
