= Raleigh Bullfrogs =

The Raleigh Bullfrogs were a Global Basketball Association franchise for only one season (1991–92). The Bullfrogs played their home games at Dorton Arena at the North Carolina State Fairgrounds. Monte Towe from NC State University was their head coach and general manager. The team finished last in the Eastern Division with a record of 28-35.

Lorenzo Charles, Chuck Nevitt, Mike Morrison, and Chris Corchiani had stints on the Bullfrogs.
