= Charlotte Regional Farmers Market =

North Carolina farmers' market

Coordinates: 35.187°N 80.910°W

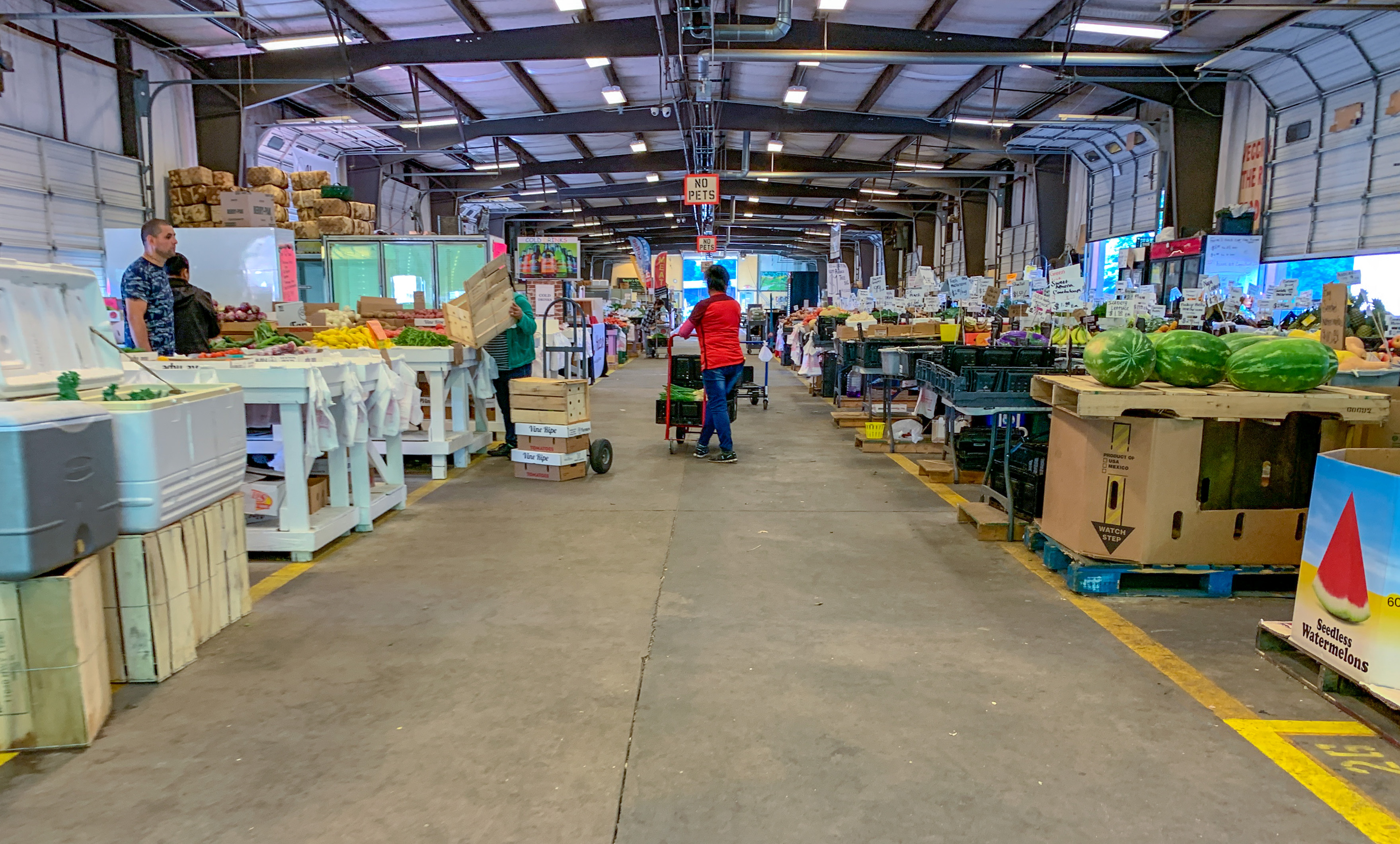
Charlotte Regional Farmers Market, 2021

Charlotte Regional Farmers Market is a farmers' market in Charlotte, North Carolina. It is also called Yorkmont Farmers Market because it is located on Yorkmont Road. The market sits on a 22-acre site. It opened in 1984, and it has expanded several times with the addition of a craft building in 2005. When it first opened, there were few local farmers market in the city. It is currently the largest farmers market in the county. It is operated by the North Carolina Department of Agriculture and Consumer Services. It is one of four state-operated farmers' markets, the other ones being in Asheville, Greensboro, and Raleigh.

The farmers' market has two retail produce buildings, one wholesale produce building, a craft building, and a greenery shed. The market is divided into five sheds, designed A through E. The three primary sheds are Building A, B, and C, whereas building D is empty wholesale space and building E is for nursery plants and food concessions. Building A contains goods from North Carolina. Many local growers have organized together and congregate on Saturdays in Building B. This is the most heavily trafficked building. Nevertheless, non-local and international goods can be found at the market. Building C has local products from South Carolina, crafts, and overflow from Building A. Overall, there are more than one hundred vendors that sell a variety of goods, such as meats, cheeses, produce, preserves, and baked goods. It is open Wednesday through Sunday. It operates all year round.

In 2023, Charlotte Regional Farmers Market celebrated its first Harvest Festival.
