= NCGA =

NCGA may refer to:

- National Collegiate Gymnastics Association
- National Cooperative Grocers Association
- National Corn Growers Association
- North Carolina General Assembly
- North Carolina Growers Association
- Northern California Golf Association
- National Council on Governmental Accounting, predecessor of the Governmental Accounting Standards Board (GASB)
