= Louisville Gardens =

Arena in Kentucky, United States

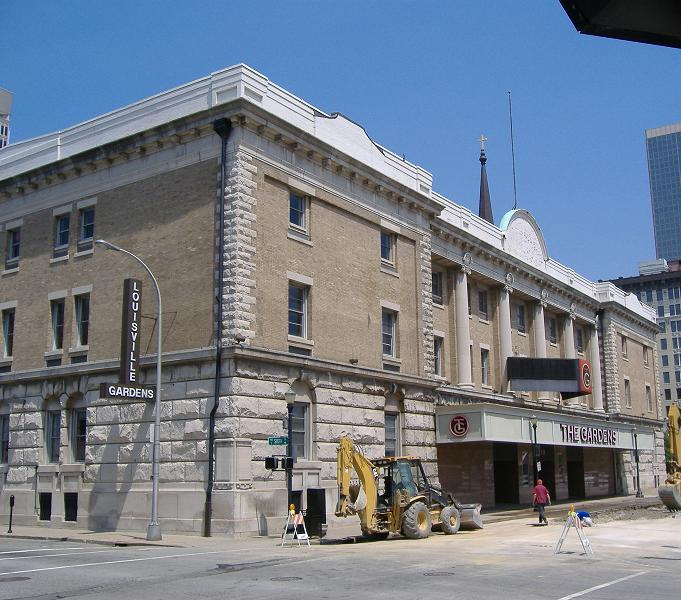
- Interactive map of Louisville Gardens
- Former names: Jefferson County Armory; Louisville Convention Center
- Location: Louisville, Kentucky
- Owner: City of Louisville
- Capacity: 6,000
- Public transit
- Jefferson County Armory
- U.S. National Register of Historic Places
- Coordinates: 38°15′5.06″N 85°45′37.26″W
- Built: 1905
- Built by: Caldwell & Drake
- Architect: Davis, Brinton B.
- Architectural style: Beaux Arts
- NRHP reference No.: 80001606
- Added to NRHP: March 24, 1980

Construction
- Opened: 1905

Tenants
- Louisville Cardinals (NCAA) (1945–1956); Louisville Blades (USHL/IHL) (1949–1951); Louisville Shooting Stars (IHL) (1953–1954); Kentucky Colonels (ABA) (1967–1970); Louisville Catbirds (CBA) (1983–1984); Louisville Shooters (GBA) (1991–1992); Kentucky Colonels (ABA) (2004–2006)

Louisville Gardens, also referred to as the Mary Helen Byck Arena, is a multi-purpose, 6,000-seat arena, in Louisville, Kentucky, that opened in 1905, as the Jefferson County Armory. It celebrated its 100th anniversary as former city mayor Jerry Abramson's official "Family-Friendly New Years Eve" celebration location. It was added to the National Register of Historic Places in 1980.

== History ==
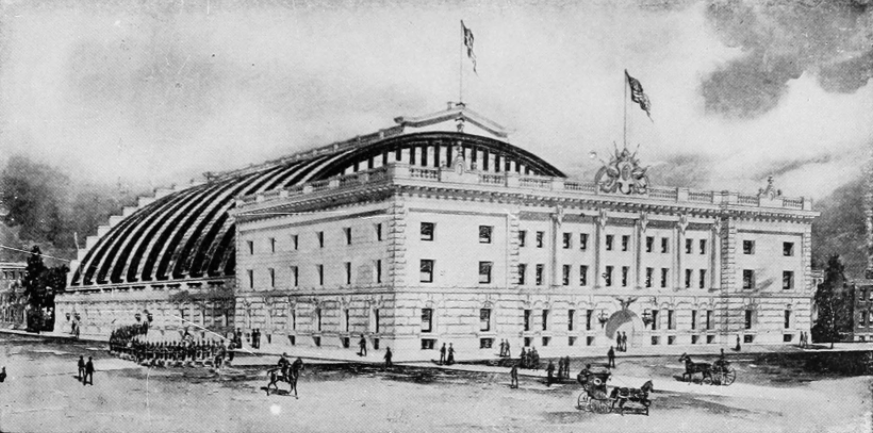
Jefferson County Armory c. 1916

The facility has served the city of Louisville and Jefferson County in a variety of ways during the past century, from utilization as an actual armory to American Basketball Association's Kentucky Colonels basketball games, to various wrestling events, concerts, political rallies, and the staging of Hurricane Katrina flood relief. Elvis Presley performed before a capacity crowd on November 25, 1956. In addition, the pop sensation band Jackson 5—known as "The Jacksons" during this era—performed on October 7, 1979, as part of the band's 4th leg from their Destiny World Tour. More recently, WWE used the 3,000-person capacity arena as a training ground for future stars in a minor-league promotion known as Ohio Valley Wrestling, until the organization moved to the Davis Arena. WWE also staged two pay-per-view events while the venue was known as Louisville Gardens: (In Your House 6 and In Your House 17: Ground Zero). TNA Wrestling held an event at the venue in 2007. Freedom Hall replaced the small, aging facility in 1956, as a more popular venue for city events. Martin Luther King Jr. (Tuesday, August 23, 1960) and Harry Truman both spoke at the arena.

== Use as a sports arena ==
Primary home of Louisville Cardinals men's basketball starting in 1945 when Bernard "Peck" Hickman was head coach until 1956 when they moved to Freedom Hall. They played occasional games there each season until their last on November 30, 1972. The Louisville Cardinals were 153–23 all time at the armory. The Kentucky Wildcats when led by Adolph Rupp played 72 games at the armory going 61–11 there from 1937 to 1956. Included in that was games played in the SEC men's basketball tournament which was held at the armory from 1941 to 1952. Additionally, the Ohio Valley Conference men's basketball tournament was held there from 1949 to 1955 and again from 1964 to 1967.

The Kentucky Colonels, of the American Basketball Association, played their home games at the facility, then known as the Louisville Convention Center, from 1967 through 1970. Louie Dampier was the team's best player in the era. On November 24, 1968, Penny Ann Early became the first female to appear in a men's professional league, playing briefly in a home game for the Colonels.

The Louisville Catbirds, of the Continental Basketball Association (1983–1984), the Louisville Shooters, of the Global Basketball Association (1991–1992) and the Kentucky Colonels, of the ABA 2000 (2004–2006), all played their home basketball games at the Louisville Gardens. The University of Louisville women's basketball team used the Gardens for six home games in the 1997–98 season. Ice hockey teams to use the Gardens as home ice include the Louisville Blades and the Louisville Shooting Stars.

== Other names ==
The building was also known as the Convention Center or Louisville Convention Center, mostly in the 1960s and 1970s. It was renamed Louisville Gardens in 1975 when the Commonwealth Convention Center (now called Kentucky International Convention Center) was being built.

== Current status ==
In 2007, the Cordish Company, manager of the nearby Fourth Street Live! entertainment complex, agreed to take over operation of "The Gardens" from the Metro Louisville Government as part of a $250 million development in downtown Louisville. In 2012, Cordish was released from its obligations to the Gardens. In 2022, plans have been announced for the venue to be turned into a soundstage.

== See also ==
- Sports in Louisville, Kentucky
