= Jerome Harmon (basketball) =

American basketball player (born 1969)

Personal information
- Born: February 6, 1969 (age 57) Gary, Indiana, U.S.
- Listed height: 6 ft 4 in (1.93 m)
- Listed weight: 199 lb (90 kg)

Career information
- High school: Lew Wallace (Gary, Indiana)
- College: Louisville (1989–1990)
- NBA draft: 1991: undrafted
- Position: Shooting guard
- Number: 40

Career history
- 1992: Louisville Shooters
- 1992–1993: Rochester Renegade
- 1993–1994: Columbus Horizon
- 1994–1995: Fort Wayne Fury
- 1995: Philadelphia 76ers
- 1996: Grand Rapids Mackers
- 1997–1998: Yakima Sun Kings

Career highlights
- Second-team Parade All-American (1987); McDonald's All-American (1987)
- Stats at NBA.com
- Stats at Basketball Reference

Jerome Harmon (born February 6, 1969, in Gary, Indiana) is an American former professional basketball shooting guard who spent one season in the National Basketball Association (NBA) as a member of the Philadelphia 76ers. He attended the University of Louisville. He sat out three of his four college seasons due to academic and injury reasons. He went undrafted in the 1991 NBA draft but played for the Seattle SuperSonics in the Los Angeles Summer Pro League. He later signed with the Washington Bullets but was waived before the start of the exhibition season. He started his professional career with the Louisville Shooters in Global Basketball Association In February 1995, he signed a 10-day contract with the Philadelphia 76ers. In his first three games, he averaged 10.7 points and 4.0 rebounds per game. He was rewarded with another 10-day contract but was released from the club at its conclusion.
