= Dorton Arena =

Arena in Raleigh, North Carolina, US

- Paraboleum
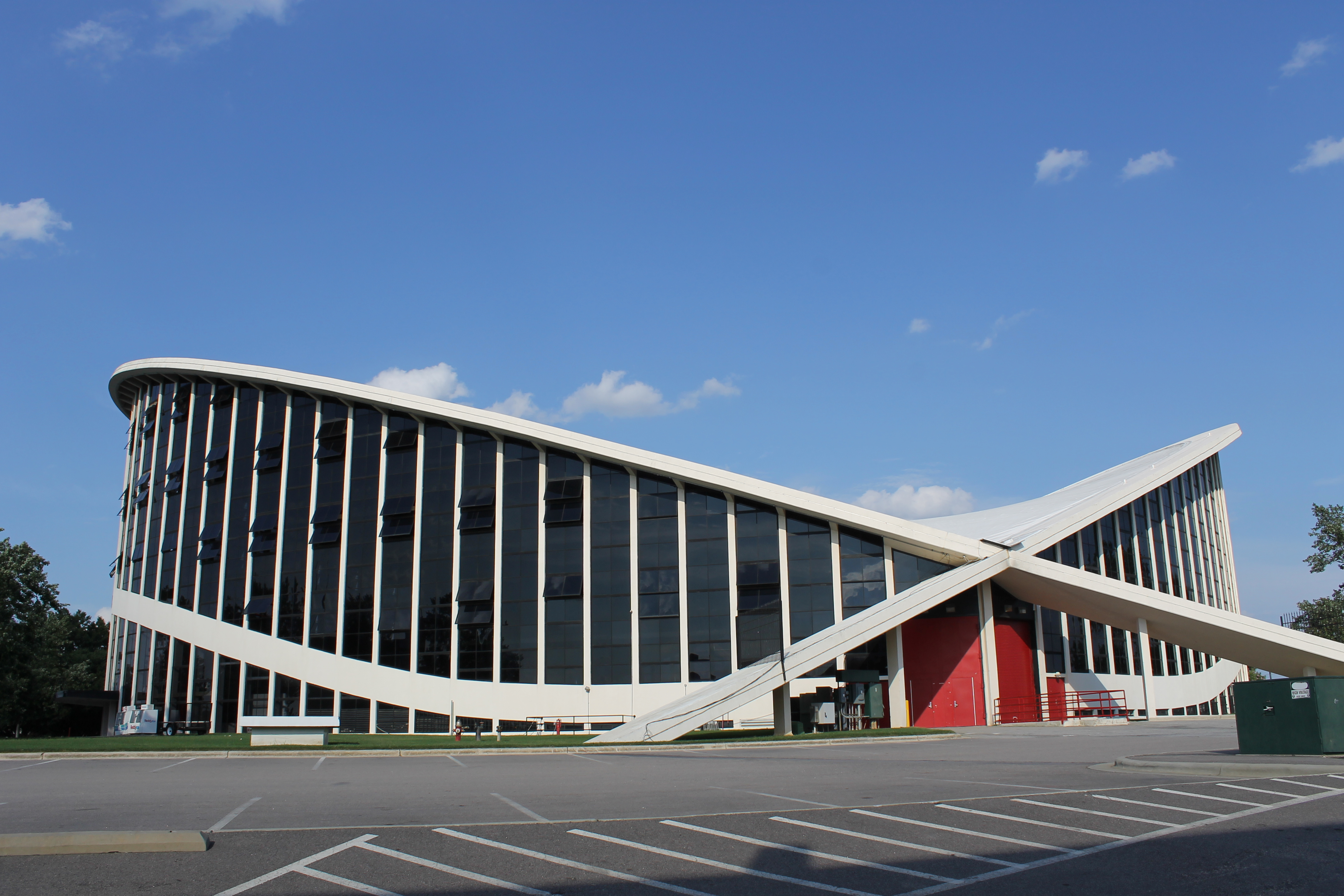
- Interactive map of Dorton Arena
- Former names: State Fair Arena (1952–1961)
- Location: North Carolina State Fairgrounds; 1025 Blue Ridge Road; Raleigh, North Carolina
- Owner: State of North Carolina
- Operator: State of North Carolina
- Capacity: 5,110 – Arena Football and Hockey; 7,610 – Basketball
- Surface: Ice, Concrete, Hardwood

Construction
- Opened: 1952
- Architects: Maciej Nowicki, William Henley Dietrick

Tenants
- Carolina Cougars (ABA) (1969–1974); Raleigh Bullfrogs (GBA) (1991–1992); Raleigh IceCaps (ECHL) (1991–1998); Raleigh Cougars (USBL) (1997–1999); Shaw University (NCAA Division II Basketball) (2002–2003); Raleigh Rebels (AIFL) (2005–2006); Carolina Roller Derby (WFTDA) (2006–present); Triangle Torch (AIF/SIF) (2016–2017)
- J. S. Dorton Arena
- U.S. National Register of Historic Places
- Location within North Carolina Location within the United States
- Location: North Carolina State Fairgrounds, W. Hillsborough St., Raleigh, North Carolina
- Coordinates: 35°47′37″N 78°42′36″W
- Built: 1953
- Architect: Nowicki, Matthew, et al.; Muirhead, William, Construction
- NRHP reference No.: 73001375
- Added to NRHP: April 11, 1973

J. S. Dorton Arena is a 7,610-seat multi-purpose arena located in Raleigh, North Carolina, on the grounds of the North Carolina State Fair. It opened in 1952 as State Fair Arena. It has hosted many sporting events, concerts, political rallies, and circuses.

Dorton Arena was the first structure in the world to use a cable-supported roof. It was listed in the National Register of Historic Places on April 11, 1973. It was designated as a National Historic Civil Engineering Landmark by the American Society of Civil Engineers in 2002.

== History ==
Dorton Arena was originally named the State Fair Arena when it opened in 1952 on the North Carolina State Fairgrounds in Raleigh, North Carolina. The building was designed by architect Maciej Nowicki of the North Carolina State University Department of Architecture, who was killed in an airplane crash before the construction phase. Local architect William Henley Dietrick supervised the completion of the arena using Nowicki's innovative design. It was dedicated to Dr. J. S. Dorton, former North Carolina State Fair manager, in 1961.

Dorton Arena was one of only two new building in the United States given a 1953 National Honor Award by the American Institute of Architects. Dorton Arena was listed in the National Register of Historic Places on April 11, 1973. It was designated as a National Historic Civil Engineering Landmark by the American Society of Civil Engineers in 2002.

== Architecture ==
Dorton Arena was the first structure in the world to use a cable-supported roof. Its design features a steel cable supported saddle-shaped roof in tension, held up by parabolic concrete arches in compression. The arches cross about 26 feet above ground level and continue underground, where their ends are held together by more steel cables in tension. The outer walls of the arena support next to no weight at all.

The arena served as an inspiration to many architects and civil engineers, both at home and abroad. This led to a boom in lightweight constructions such as the Europe 1-Broadcasting House (1954) in Überherrn, the auditorium Paul-Emile Janson (1956) in Bruxelles, the Ingalls Rink (1958) in New Haven, the Športová hala Pasienky (1958) in Bratislava, the Yoyogi National Gymnasium (1964) in Tokyo, the Ice Aréna (1965) in Prešov and the Sporthal Beverwijk (1971) in Beverwijk.

== Events ==
=== Sports ===
Dorton Arena has hosted numerous sporting events and teams throughout the decades. The longest-running tenant was the Raleigh IceCaps (ECHL) ice hockey team from 1991–1998. The American Basketball Association's Carolina Cougars also played some games in the arena from 1969–74. It was also the home of the Carolina Rollergirls (WFTDA).

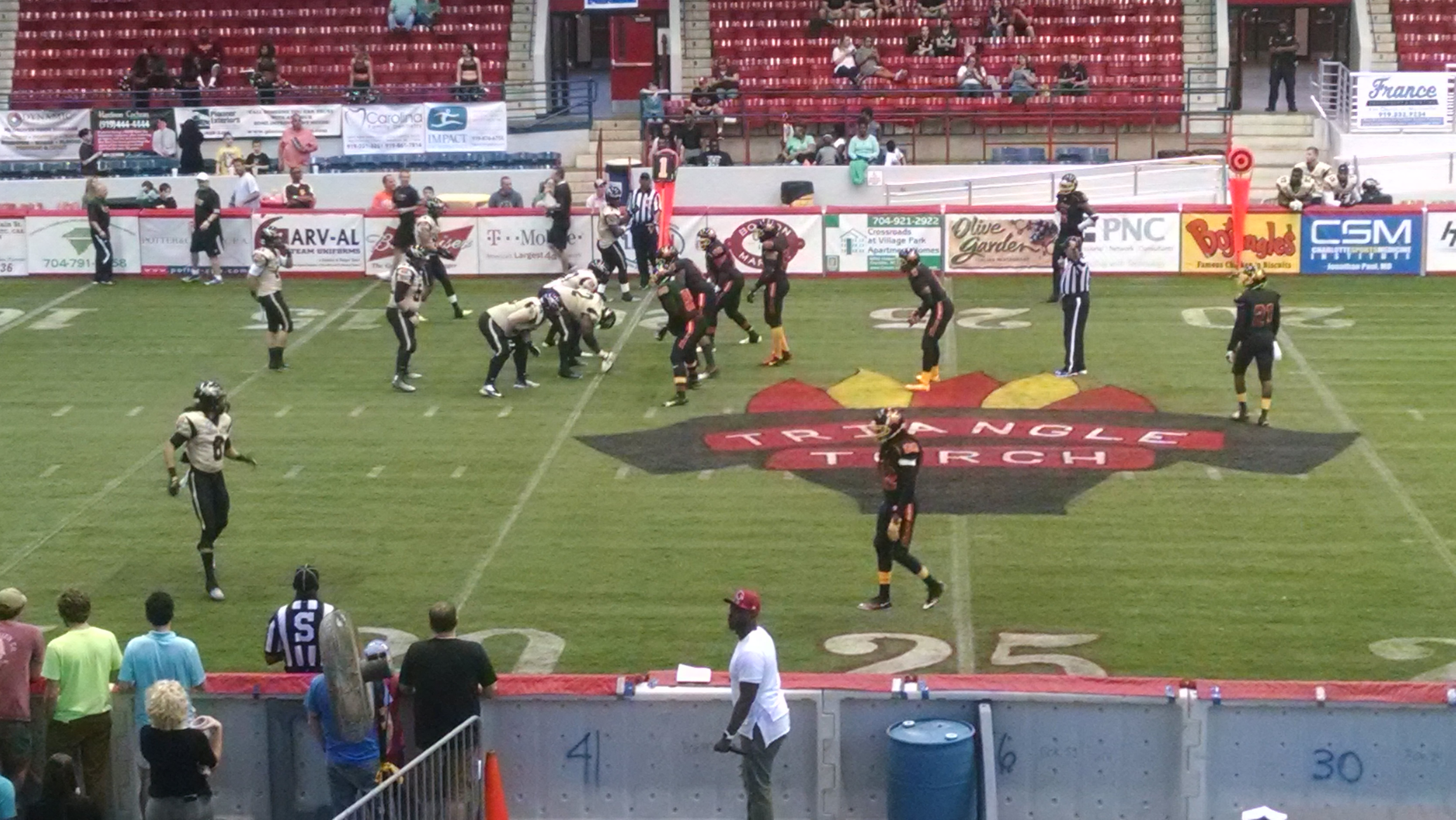
Triangle Torch vs. Lehigh Valley Steelhawks at Dorton Arena, March 25, 2016

The Cougars became tenants after the Houston Mavericks moved to North Carolina in 1969. The Cougars were a "regional franchise", playing "home" games in Charlotte (Bojangles' Coliseum), Greensboro (Greensboro Coliseum), Winston-Salem Memorial Coliseum and Raleigh (Dorton Arena). Hall of Fame Coach Larry Brown began his coaching career with the Cougars in 1972. Billy Cunningham was the ABA MVP for Brown and the Cougars in the 1972–73 season. Despite a strong fan base, the Cougars were sold and moved to St. Louis in 1974.

Dorton Arena was a popular venue for professional wrestling in the 70s and 80s, with sometimes weekly matches. Wrestler Rowdy Roddy Piper defeated "Nature Boy" Ric Flair for the National Wrestling Alliance U.S. Heavyweight championship in Dorton Arena on Jan. 27, 1981.

Beginning in 2016, it became the home of the Triangle Torch in American Indoor Football. The Torch have since played as members of Supreme Indoor Football but left Dorton Arena before the 2018 season in the American Arena League.

=== Other events ===
Besides hosting sporting events, the arena is also used for concerts during the North Carolina State Fair. Various conventions and fairs also use the floorspace of the arena as an exhibition space, often in conjunction with the neighboring Jim Graham building. One such event is the annual Southern Farm Show.

The arena has hosted the FIRST Robotics Competition (FRC) regional robotics competition and was the first space to hold a regional in the state.

Both Shaw University and Meredith College use Dorton Arena as a site for graduation, and the North Carolina School of Science and Mathematics uses the facility as a rain site for their commencement exercises.

=== Concerts (non-fair) ===
Dorton Arena and Reynolds Coliseum were the only concert venues in the Capital City for many decades before Coastal Credit Union Music Park and Lenovo Center were built. The building was originally designed for livestock shows, and before popular music concerts began to be regularly hosted in arenas, so while there are unobstructed views of the stage, the sound tends to bounce off the glass. Fair officials have made significant changes to improve the acoustics of the building in recent years. Many of the biggest names in entertainment have played in this arena.

Performer	Date	Reference
Ray Charles and his Augmented Orchestra	October 8, 1962	
Johnny Cash	September 8, 1963	
The Original Hootenanny: The Journeymen, The Halifax 111, The Geezinslaw Brothers, Jo Mapes, Glenn Yarbrough	November 1, 1963	
Caravan of Record Stars: The Shirelles, The Supremes, The Coasters	July 22, 1964	
The Four Seasons	May 4, 1964	
The Beach Boys, The Embers, The Unknown 4, Inmates	July 12, 1965	
Warner Mack, the Wilburn Brothers, Harold Morrison	November 26, 1965	
The Righteous Brothers	October 28, 1966	
Wilson Pickett Show, Jr. Walker and the All Stars, Sam & Dave, Billy Stewart, James Carr, TV Mama, King Coleman and Al "TNT" Braggs and his orchestra	November 14, 1966	
Otis Redding, the Marvelettes, James & Bobby Purify, The Drifters	January 30, 1967	
The Supremes	February 5, 1967	
Lou Rawls	February 18, 1967	
The Temptations	March 12, 1967	
The Beach Boys, Davy Jones	April 23, 1968 (rescheduled from April 6)	
The Four Seasons	May 4, 1968	
Jimi Hendrix Experience, Fat Mattress	April 11, 1969	
Led Zeppelin	April 8, 1970	
Jerry Lee Lewis, Linda Gail Lewis	August 29, 1970	
The Grand Funk Railroad	April 23, 1971	
The Jackson 5	August 1, 1971	
Jerry Lee Lewis, Dolly Parton, Porter Wagoner	May 28, 1971	
James Taylor, Carole King	March 4, 1971	
The Jackson 5	August 1, 1971	
Black Sabbath	March 6, 1972	
King Crimson	March 29, 1972	
Jethro Tull, Captain Beefheart and His Magic Band	April 20, 1972	
Chicago	April 26, 1972	
The Guess Who	August 10, 1972	
The Sylvers	November 16, 1973	
Blood Sweat and Tears with the North Carolina Symphony	January 12, 1974	
Kris Kristofferson, Waylon Jennings	February 15, 1974	
Todd Rundgren's Utopia	March 8, 1974	
Marvin Gaye, The Independents	November 16, 1974	
KISS Rock & Roll Over tour	November 27, 1976	
Climax Blues Band	November 27, 1976	
The Outlaws, Rick Derringer, Foghat	January 22, 1977	
Rick James, Prince	March 15, 1980	
Kool and the Gang, The Gap Band, Skyy, Yarbrough and Peoples	March 27, 1981	
PKM	March 1, 1982	
Loverboy	September 1982	
Prince	March 12, 1982	
Maxwell House Give 'em A Hand Concert: Waylon Jennings, Jessi Colter, Jerry Reed, Lee Greenwood, Cabin Fever	July 2, 1983	
Heart	August 31, 1985	
Ratt, Bon Jovi	November 1, 1985	
George Thorogood	November 30, 1986	
Stevie Ray Vaughan and Double Trouble	February 11, 1987	
Petra	November 2, 1990	
Third Day	May 18, 2012	
Thompson Square / Lainey Wilson	September 23, 2018	

== See also ==
- Tensile architecture
- Tensile and membrane structures
- Thin-shell structure
- List of thin shell structures
- List of Registered Historic Places in North Carolina
- List of historic civil engineering landmarks
