= Johnny Neumann =

American basketball player and coach (1950–2019)

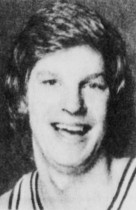
- Neumann, in 1974.

Personal information
- Born: September 11, 1951 Memphis, Tennessee, U.S.
- Died: April 23, 2019 (aged 68) Oxford, Mississippi, U.S.
- Listed height: 6 ft 6 in (1.98 m)
- Listed weight: 200 lb (91 kg)

Career information
- High school: Overton (Memphis, Tennessee)
- College: Ole Miss (1970–1971)
- NBA draft: 1973: 6th round, 98th overall pick
- Drafted by: Chicago Bulls
- Playing career: 1971–1982
- Position: Small forward / shooting guard
- Number: 14, 22, 44, 4, 31, 21
- Coaching career: 1982–2017

Career history

Playing
- 1971–1974: Memphis Pros / Tams
- 1974: Utah Stars
- 1974: Virginia Squires
- 1974–1975: Indiana Pacers
- 1975: Virginia Squires
- 1975–1976: Kentucky Colonels
- 1976: Buffalo Braves
- 1976–1977: Los Angeles Lakers
- 1977: Indiana Pacers
- 1978–1979: Gabetti Cantù
- 1980–1982: Saturn Köln

Coaching
- 1982–1984: Maine Lumberjacks / Bay State Bombardiers
- 1986–1987: RBC Pepinster
- 1987–1989: PAOK Thessaloniki
- 1989–1990: Pagrati Athens
- 1991–1992: Louisville Shooters
- 1992–1993: Iraklis Thessaloniki
- 1993–1994: Pezoporikos
- 1994–1995: AEK Larnaca
- 1997–1998: APOEL
- 1998: Hapoel Tel Aviv
- 1999–2000: Youngstown Hawks
- 2000: Kazma Sport Club
- 2001–2002: Lebanon
- 2003–2004: Al-Hilal Riyadh
- 2005: Al Ittihad
- 2006–2007: Zhejiang Lions
- 2007–2009: Rizing Fukuoka
- 2009–2010: Takamatsu Five Arrows
- 2010–2012: Romania
- 2016–2017: South Panola HS (assistant)

Career highlights
- As player: ABA All-Rookie First Team (1972); FIBA Saporta Cup Finals Top Scorer (1979); 2× German League champion (1981, 1982); German Cup winner (1981); Consensus second-team All-American (1971); NCAA scoring champion (1971); SEC Player of the Year (1971); As head coach: Cypriot League champion (1994); 2× Cypriot League Coach of the Year (1994, 1995)

Career ABA and NBA statistics
- Points: 6,022 (13.2 ppg)
- Rebounds: 1,234 (2.7 rpg)
- Assists: 1,345 (3.0 apg)
- Stats at NBA.com
- Stats at Basketball Reference

Carl John Neumann (September 11, 1951 – April 23, 2019), nicknamed "Johnny Reb", was an American professional basketball player and coach. At 6'6" and 200 pounds, he played at the shooting guard and small forward positions.

== High school and college ==
Following a standout career at Overton High School in Memphis, Neumann took his game to the University of Mississippi, where he played from 1969 to 1971. During his sophomore season, he drew comparisons to Pete Maravich, after averaging an NCAA-high of 40.1 points per game. His strongest performances included a 63-point game against Louisiana State University and a 60-point game against Baylor University. Neumann earned All-America and SEC Player of the Year honors at the end of the season.

Johnny Neumann returned to Ole Miss and completed his undergraduate degree, in 2016. After earning his degree, he returned to coaching. He was named to the 2016 SEC Legends class. Neumann continues to hold the Ole Miss single-season scoring record of 923 points.

== Professional career ==
=== Memphis Pros and Memphis Tams ===
After his sophomore season at Ole Miss, Neumann became the first player in basketball history to sign a hardship clause as he signed a five-year, $2 million contract with the Memphis Pros of the American Basketball Association. Neumann was later drafted by the Chicago Bulls, in the 6th round of the 1973 NBA draft.

Neumann's professional career started strong, with averages of 18.3 points per game and 19.6 points per game in his first two full seasons with Memphis. He was named to the ABA All-Rookie Team in 1972. However, Neumann gradually fell out of favor with the team's head coach and management, who thought he was not passing the ball enough, and he was traded by the Memphis Tams to the Utah Stars, in exchange for Glen Combs, Ronnie Robinson, Mike Jackson and cash, in January 1974.

The exploits of Neumann were briefly detailed in Terry Pluto's book Loose Balls, which had varuous players note his talent in scoring along with his immaturity that never quite ended in his playing days.

=== Utah Stars ===
In Neumann's first year with the Utah Stars, his team won the ABA Western Division and defeated the San Diego Conquistadors, in the Western Division Semifinals and the Indiana Pacers in the Western Division Finals, to make it to the ABA Championship series, where they lost the 1974 ABA Finals to the New York Nets. Despite the team's success, Neumann struggled to regain his scoring average after being traded to Utah. He averaged just 10.1 points per game, in 44 games played with the Stars.

=== Virginia Squires and Indiana Pacers ===
In August 1974 the Stars traded Neumann and a draft choice, to the Virginia Squires, in exchange for Jim Eakins and Larry Miller. After just four games with the Squires, the Indiana Pacers bought Neumann's rights from the Squires, in November 1974. He averaged 8.3 points per game with Indiana. Neumann finished out the 1974–75 season as a Pacer, and in March 1975, the Virginia Squires bought Neumann's rights back from the Pacers.

Neumann averaged 16.6 points per game for Virginia during the 1975–76 season, but in January 1976, he was traded by the Squires.

=== Kentucky Colonels ===
In January 1976, Neumann was traded along with Jan van Breda Kolff, to the Kentucky Colonels, in exchange for Marv Roberts. He averaged 10.1 points per game as the Colonels defeated the Indiana Pacers in the ABA Quarterfinals and lost a 4–3 seven-game series to the Denver Nuggets, in the 1976 ABA Semifinals.

=== NBA ===
After the ABA–NBA merger took place in June 1976, Neumann ended up with the Buffalo Braves. From 1976 to 1978, Neumann played 83 games in the NBA, as a member of the Braves, Los Angeles Lakers, and once again with the Pacers. His 1977–78 campaign with the Pacers, during which he averaged just 4.2 points per game, would be his last in the United States.

=== Europe ===
After leaving the NBA, Neumann took his game to Europe, where he competed in the Italian A League with Gabetti Cantù, in the 1978–79 season, and in the German Federal League, with Saturn Köln, from 1980 to 1982.

== Coaching career ==
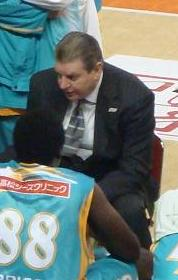
Neumann coaching Takamatsu Five Arrows in 2010

Neumann became an assistant coach while playing in Germany, a position that would prove to be his first of many basketball coaching jobs. Neumann also coached in Belgium, Greece, Cyprus, Israel, Kuwait, Lebanon, Saudi Arabia, China, and Japan, as well as in the American minor-league Continental Basketball Association with the Maine Lumberjacks. Neumann also coached the Louisville Shooters of the Global Basketball Association, in 1991 and 1992. While in Cyprus, he discovered Darrell Armstrong, a little-known American point guard from Fayetteville State University, who later found success in the NBA.

On June 23, 2010, Neumann was appointed as the new head coach of the Romanian national team. After graduation from Ole Miss with a bachelor's degree in general studies, he hoped to obtain a position as a professional sports analyst and broadcaster, but those opportunities did not materialize. In an attempt to reenter coaching while waiting for the next professional opportunity, he served as an assistant coach at South Panola High School, in Batesville, Mississippi.

== Death ==
Neumann had suffered from several health issues for many years. By 2018, Johnny's health had declined significantly and it was discovered he had developed a brain tumor. In spite of surgery, Neumann died in Oxford, Mississippi, on April 23, 2019, after struggling against brain cancer. His ashes were deposited in an undisclosed location, but close to some of his most significant basketball achievements.

== Head coaching record ==
Legend
Regular season	G	Games coached	W	Games won	L	Games lost	W–L %	Win–loss %
Playoffs	PG	Playoff games	PW	Playoff wins	PL	Playoff losses	PW–L %	Playoff win–loss %

Team	Year	G	W	L	W–L%	Finish	PG	PW	PL	PW–L%	Result
Rizing Fukuoka	2007–08	44	20	24	.455	3rd in Western	1	0	1	.000	Lost in playoff semifinals
Rizing Fukuoka	2008–09	52	22	30	.423	4th in Western	2	0	2	.000	Lost in 1st round
Takamatsu Five Arrows	2009–10	52	13	39	.250	7th in Western	-	-	-	–	-

== See also ==
- List of NCAA Division I men's basketball players with 60 or more points in a game
- List of NCAA Division I men's basketball season scoring leaders
