= Monte Towe =

American basketball player and coach (born 1953)

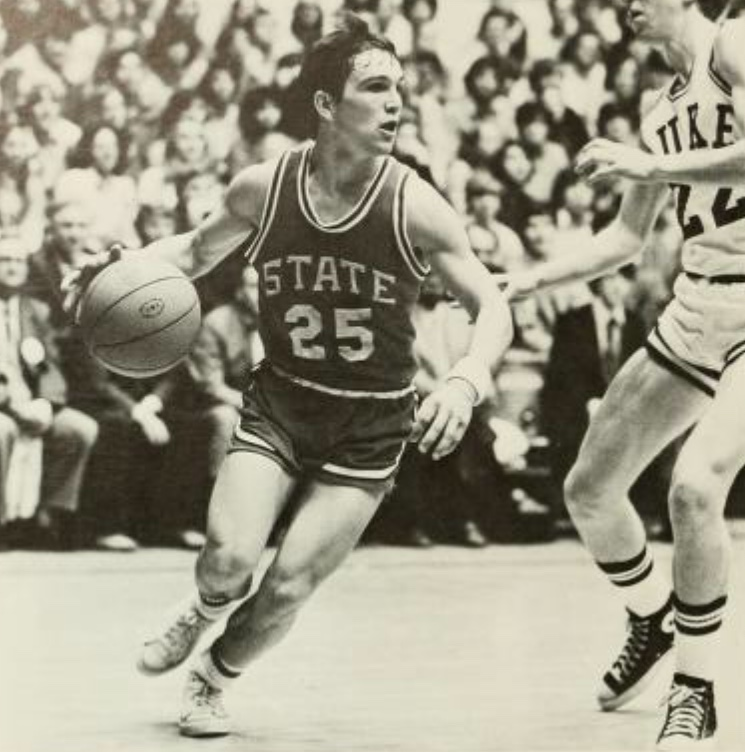
- Towe from the 1974 Agromeck

Personal information
- Born: September 27, 1953 (age 73) Marion, Indiana, U.S.
- Listed height: 5 ft 7 in (1.70 m)
- Listed weight: 150 lb (68 kg)

Career information
- High school: Oak Hill (Converse, Indiana)
- College: NC State (1972–1975)
- NBA draft: 1975: 4th round, 57th overall pick
- Drafted by: Atlanta Hawks
- Playing career: 1975–1977
- Position: Point guard
- Number: 13

Career history

Playing
- 1975–1977: Denver Nuggets

Coaching
- 1978–1980: NC State (assistant)
- 1980–1989: Florida (assistant)
- 1991–1992: Raleigh Bullfrogs
- 1992–1993: Fayetteville Flyers
- 1993–1993: Marinos Oriente
- 1994–1995: Sioux Falls Skyforce (assistant)
- 1995–1996: Chipola College
- 1996–1999: UNC Asheville (assistant)
- 1999–2001: Santa Fe Community College
- 2001–2006: New Orleans
- 2006–2010: NC State (assistant)
- 2011–2014: Middle Tennessee (assistant)

Career highlights
- ABA All-Star (1976); NCAA champion (1974); Frances Pomeroy Naismith Award (1975); First-team All-ACC (1974); No. 25 jersey honored by NC State Wolfpack
- Stats at NBA.com
- Stats at Basketball Reference

Monte Corwin Towe (born September 27, 1953) is an American former basketball coach and professional player. He was a starting point guard on the 1973–74 North Carolina State Wolfpack men's basketball team which won the NCAA Division I Men's Basketball Championship. At five feet seven inches, Towe is also one of the ten shortest players in NBA history.

== Early life ==
Towe was born in Marion, Indiana. His hometown is Converse, Indiana.

Towe attended Oak Hill High School in Converse, graduating in 1971. There, he played golf, shooting in the eighties. He also starred on the basketball team, baseball team, and football team—earning All-Area honors for the latter two. As a quarterback, he led the Oak Hill football team to two undefeated seasons, for a total of eighteen consecutive victories.

He attended North Carolina State University, graduating with a B.A. in 1975. At NC State, he played varsity basketball from 1972 through 1975 and varsity baseball from 1972 through 1974. His roommate was Tommy Burleson.

== College basketball ==
When he first arrived on campus at North Carolina State University to play varsity basketball, Towe was considered "a novelty, or another publicity gimmick, much like a midget in Barnum & Bailey's" because of his the five feet seven inches (1.70 m) height. At the time, Towe said, "I've never thought a small man couldn't play sports. I just figure what I lack physically I can make up for mentally—with mental toughness."

Towe played much of his sophomore season with a broken wrist and a broken nose. Towe, along with David Thompson, is credited with inventing the long pass or alley-oop. Because dunking was illegal at the time, Towe would throw the basketball to Thompson while he was in the air and Thompson would gently drop the ball in the basket. As a result, the UPI selected Towe for its small-American team after his sophomore year.

In his junior year, Towe was the starting point guard on 1973–74 NC State Wolfpack men's basketball team which won the 1974 NCAA Division I Men's Basketball Championship. He was the team's assist leader with five or more assists in ten games. He had eleven assists in the game against Furman University. Towe was recognized by his selection for the All-ACC team and the all-NCAA Finals team.

His senior year, Towe received the 1975 Frances Pomeroy Naismith Award as the year's best college player under 6 feet (1.8 m) tall.

In 2016, the 1974 Men's Basketball Team was inducted into the NC State Athletic Hall of Fame.

== College baseball ==
At NC State, Towe also played varsity baseball, covering second base for his first five games in the spring of 1972. However, he got a late start to the season because he was still playing basketball. Coach Sam Esposito said, "He came in cold and has been playing second base like he's been here all his life. He's alert, aggressive, and just does things excessively well. Monte's something else, something we've been needing on this team. He keeps us alive, he's a winner and he'll be my second baseman the rest of the year. I'd bet anybody right now that he'll be starting in basketball next year too."

True to his word, Esposito played Towe for the remaining games of the season and he helped the team win seven of its remaining eight games.

His sophomore year, Towe was one of the featured players in the team's media guide However, his broken wrist was expected to hamper a starting position. With Towe, NC State won the 1973 Atlantic Coast Conference baseball tournament. In his junior year, Towe was also a member of the baseball team which won 1974 Atlantic Coast Conference baseball tournament.

== Pro basketball career ==
Towe was drafted by the Denver Nuggets in the third round of the 1975 ABA Draft and by the Atlanta Hawks in the fourth round (3rd pick, 57th overall) of the 1975 NBA draft. Towe joined NC State teammate David Thompson in signing with Denver under coach Larry Brown on June 17, 1975. He played for the Nuggets 1976, the final year of the American Basketball Association, and in the 1976–1977 season when Denver joined the National Basketball Association.

He played in the 1976 ABA All-Star Game when the game format was Denver vs. All-Stars. The Denver Nuggets waived Towe on September 29, 1977.

== Coaching career ==
After his retirement as a player, Towe returned to NC State and became an assistant under his former college coach, Norm Sloan, from 1978 to 1980. He then followed Sloan to the University of Florida from 1980 to 1989. In 1990, Towe did television analyst work for the Charlotte Hornets.

He coached professional teams associated with the Global Basketball Association in the 1990s, including being the head coach of the Raleigh Bullfrogs from 1991 to 1992 and head coach of the Fayetteville Flyers from 1992 to 1993. In 1993, he was coach of the Marinos B.B.C. in Venezuela, leading them to the Venezuelan Professional League Championship. He returned to the United States and was an assistant for the Sioux Falls Skyforce of the Continental Basketball Association under head coach Flip Saunders from 1994 to 1995.

From 1995 to 1996, he was the head coach and athletic director at Chipola College, a junior college in Florida. Next, he was an assistant coach at the University of North Carolina at Asheville from 1996 to 1999 under former NC State assistant coach Eddie Biedenbach. He was also head coach of the Santa Fe Community College for two years, from 1999 through 2001.

In 2001, Towe became the head basketball coach at the University of New Orleans. He compiled a 70–78 record over five seasons. In May 2006, he left the University of New Orleans to become associate head coach at North Carolina State under head coach and fellow NC State alumnus Sidney Lowe. Although NC State went to two National Invitation Tournaments under Lowe and Towe, the team did not go to the NCAA tournament in five seasons. Lowe, Towe and the other coaching staff were let go in 2011.

On April 14, 2011, he was named an assistant coach at Middle Tennessee State University under Kermit Davis, staying there through 2014. In 2017, Towe became the head coach at Oak Hall School.

== Awards and honors ==
- NC State Athletic Hall of Fame as part of the 1974 Men's Basketball Team, 2016
- Indiana Basketball Hall of Fame, 2002
- Frances Pomeroy Naismith Award, 1975
