= Global Basketball Association =

Global Basketball Association (GBA)
- Sport: Basketball
- Founded: March 1991
- Folded: December 1992
- Owner: Ted Stepien
- Commissioner: Mike Storen (1991–92); Ted Stepien (1992)
- No. of teams: 8–11
- Country: United States
- Most titles: Music City Jammers (1992)

The Global Basketball Association (GBA) was a professional basketball minor league based in the United States. The majority of the league's franchises were based in the Southern United States, with the remaining teams located in the Midwest. The league announced plans for franchises in European cities that never materialized. The league began play in 1991 and lasted one and a half seasons before folding in December 1992.

== History ==
When the league was announced in 1991, league officials said there would be franchises around the world, hence the name "Global Basketball Association" (GBA). The league was owned and founded by Ted Stepien, the owner of the Cleveland Cavaliers from 1980 to 1983. Two international teams were announced: Tallinn, Soviet Union (now Estonia) and San Marino. The team from the Soviet Union was KK Kalev, which was a professional basketball team founded in 1920. The four American teams announced were Greensboro, North Carolina; Raleigh, North Carolina; Nashville, Tennessee and Greenville, South Carolina. Vilvoorde, Belgium and Évry, France were later awarded GBA franchises.

Mike Storen, who served as commissioner of the American Basketball Association from 1973 to 1975, was named commissioner of the GBA. The league announced a 64-game schedule in from November 1991 to March 1992, followed by a playoff for the league championship. To distinguish itself from other basketball leagues, the GBA used a white basketball, which was manufactured by MacGregor.

In May 1991, the GBA awarded a charter franchise to Huntsville, Alabama. The GBA merged Pro Basketball USA, another fledgling basketball minor league, in August 1991. The GBA adopted six of Pro Basketball USA's franchises: the Albany Sharp Shooters, the Louisville Shooters, the Memphis HotShots, the Fayetteville Flyers, the Mid-Michigan Great Lakers and the Wichita Outlaws.

The GBA draft was held on August 3, 1991 in Atlanta, Georgia. It was broken-up into three rounds. The first round was the territorial round where teams were limited to selecting players within a 100-mile radius of their home arena. In the second round, teams could only draft free agents. The third and final round was the collegiate draft, where teams could pick players from colleges across the United States. The Greensboro City Gaters selected Keith Gatlin with the first overall pick in the draft.

By the start of the 1991–92 season in November 1991, the GBA only had franchises based in the United States. League officials said the international teams would begin play in the 1992–93 season. The Mid-Michigan Great Lakers let people attend the first few games for free, which attracted around 3,000 attendees per game. When the Great Lakers started charging for tickets, the team averaged 200 attendees. The Music City Jammers were last in attendance, averaging 300 people per game. They played a game on February 2, 1992 at the 11,000 seat Nashville Municipal Auditorium, which had a total attendance (including the players, referees and statisticians) of 136.

The Louisville Shooters in October 1991 announced plans for a $125,000 to $175,000 marketing campaign to advertise the GBA's inaugural season. The firm Bridgemon, James & Shawver Advertising Inc.—who also worked on marketing for the Louisville Redbirds professional baseball team—was contracted to run the campaign which consisted of newspaper ads, television and radio ads and a 30-minute infomercial on WAVE (TV). By February 1992, team owner Jim Tilton told Business First-Louisville the Shooters were facing "a pretty heavy loss" and he was seeking a new line of credit to keep the team afloat. The team had sold 150 season tickets and were averaging 2,250 attendees per game. A deal to sell the Shooters to an ownership group led by David Gleason fell through. By mid-March 1992, the Shooters had their telephone service shut off for failed payment. On March 31, 1992, the office furniture at the team's headquarters was repossessed. The team also had to forfeit their first round playoff series against the Mid-Michigan Great Lakers due to failure to pay rent on their home venue, Louisville Gardens. As of April 1992, the Shooters owed $23,000 in back rent to the Louisville Gardens owners.

After the 1991–92 season, GBA commissioner Mike Storen announced he was stepping away from the league to focus on his sports marketing business.

David Gleason, who attempted to purchase the Louisville Shooters in February 1992, eventually purchased the franchise from Jim Tilton. Gleason said the purchase did not include the legal obligation for $300,000 in outstanding debts owed by Tilton, however, Gleason still had to pay the debts as he wanted his debtors services. He had to settle his account with Bridgemon, James & Shawver Advertising Inc. before they would agree to continue working for the team. When they did settle the debt, the advertising firm only agreed to work on an hourly rate and would no longer let debts accrue. Gleason came to an agreement that let him continue to use Louisville Gardens as the team's home venue. The Shooters folded after three games into the 1992–93 season. The league itself disbanded in December 1992.

== Teams ==
Locations of Global Basketball Association teams

→ denotes that a team was relocated and/or renamed, (YEAR)^{§} denotes team never played

- Albany Sharp Shooters (1991–92) → SouthGA Blues (1992)
- Cedar Rapids Sharpshooters (1992)
- Évry, France (1991)^{§}
- Fayetteville Flyers (1991–92)
- Greensboro Triad (1991)^{§} → Greensboro City Gaters (1991–92)
- Greenville Spinners (1991–92)
- Huntsville Lasers (1991–92)
- Kalev Tallinn (1991)^{§}
- Louisville Shooters (1991–92)
- Memphis HotShots (1991–92) → Pensacola HotShots (1992)
- Mid-Michigan Great Lakers (1991–92)
- Mississippi Coast Sharks (1992)
- Music City Jammers (1991–92) → Jackson Jammers (1992)
- Raleigh Bullfrogs (1991–92)
- San Marino (1991)^{§}
- Vilvoorde, Belgium (1992)^{§}
- Wichita Outlaws (1991–92)

== Venues and locations ==
Venue	Location	Team	Ref
Albany Civic Center	Albany, Georgia	Albany Sharp Shooters (1991–92); SouthGA Blues (1992–93)	
Century II Convention Hall	Wichita, Kansas	Wichita Outlaws	
Cumberland County Civic Center	Fayetteville, North Carolina	Fayetteville Flyers	
Dorton Arena	Raleigh, North Carolina	Raleigh Bullfrogs	
Five Seasons Center	Cedar Rapids, Iowa	Cedar Rapids Sharpshooters	
Greensboro Coliseum Complex	Greensboro, North Carolina	Greensboro City Gaters	
Greenville Memorial Auditorium	Greenville, South Carolina	Greenville Spinners	
Louisville Gardens	Louisville, Kentucky	Louisville Shooters	
Mid-South Coliseum	Memphis, Tennessee	Memphis HotShots	
Mississippi Coast Coliseum	Biloxi, Mississippi	Mississippi Coast Sharks	
Nashville Municipal Auditorium	Nashville, Tennessee	Music City Jammers	
Oman Arena	Jackson, Tennessee	Jackson Jammers	
Pensacola Civic Center	Pensacola, Florida	Pensacola HotShots	
Von Braun Civic Center	Huntsville, Alabama	Huntsville Lasers	
Wendler Arena	Saginaw, Michigan	Mid-Michigan Great Lakers	

== Season standings ==
=== 1991–92 season ===
Team	Wins	L	W	GB	Head coach	Ref
Eastern Division
Fayetteville Flyers	41	23	.641	—	Kevin Mackey	
Greenville Spinners	36	28	.562	5	Joe Williams	
Albany Sharp Shooters	35	29	.547	6	Mauro Panaggio	
Greensboro City Gaters	30	33	.476	10.5	Ed McLean	
Raleigh Bullfrogs	28	35	.444	12.5	Monte Towe	
Western Division
Mid-Michigan Great Lakers	42	22	.656	—	Cazzie Russell	
Louisville Shooters	35	29	.547	7	Johnny Neumann	
Huntsville Lasers	33	31	.516	9	Jim Sleeper	
Music City Jammers	24	40	.375	18	Tommy Smith	
Pensacola HotShots	24	40	.375	18	Dana Kirk	
Wichita Outlaws	23	41	.359	19	Keith Fowler	

=== 1991–92 playoffs ===
Bracket

GBA First Round
1	Fayetteville Flyers	1
7	Greensboro City Gaters	0
3	Greenville Spinners	0
4	Albany Sharpshooters	0
2	Michigan Great Lakers	0
4	Louisville Shooters	0
6	Huntsville Lasers	1
8	Music City Jammers	2

GBA Semifinals
1	Fayetteville Flyers
3	Greenville Spinners
2	Michigan Great Lakers	3
8	Music City Jammers	4

GBA Finals
3	Greenville Spinners	2
8	Music City Jammers	4

Finals game-by-game results

- Greenville 128, Music City 126
- Music City 100, Greenville 94
- Greenville 114, Music City 103
- Music City 103, Greenville 101
- Music City 103, Greenville 100
- Music City 106, Greenville 104

=== 1992–93 season ===
Team	Wins	L	W	GB	Head coach	Ref
Cedar Rapids Sharpshooters	12	4	.750	—	Rick Barry	
Greenville Spinners	9	5	.643	2		
Fayetteville Flyers	10	7	.588	2.5		
SouthGA Blues	8	8	.500	4		
Mid-Michigan Great Lakers	6	9	.400	5.5		
Mississippi Coast Sharks	6	9	.400	5.5		
Jackson Jammers	6	12	.333	7		
Louisville Shooters	0	3	.000	—		

Note: Louisville disbanded after three games, the GBA disbanded in December 1992

== Award winners ==
- GBA All-Star Game Most Valuable Player
  - Lloyd Daniels, Greensboro City Gaters
- GBA All-League Team, 1991–92
  - John Crotty, Greenville Spinners
  - Reggie Fox, Mid-Michigan Great Lakers
  - Willie McDuffie, Greenville Spinners
  - Danny Pearson, Greenville Spinners
  - Lloyd Daniels, Greensboro City Gaters
  - Mike Ratliff, Huntsville Lasers
  - Joey Wright, Memphis/Pensacola HotShots
  - Alfredrick Hughes, Louisville Shooters
  - Jerome Harmon, Louisville Shooters
- GBA All-Defensive Team, 1991–92
  - David Harris, Huntsville Lasers
  - Sean Gay, Greensboro City Gaters
  - James Martin, Fayetteville Flyers
  - Paris McCurdy, Mid-Michigan Great Lakers
  - Lorenzo Williams, Fayetteville Flyers

== Notable players ==
=== International players ===
- James Blackwell, USA National team (1999) - 5 appearances
- Chris Corchiani, USA National team (1989) - FIBA AmeriCup
- Eldridge Recasner, USA National team (1993) - FIBA AmeriCup
