= North Carolina Department of Agriculture and Consumer Services =

State agency in the United States

- Seal of the North Carolina Department of Agriculture and Consumer Services

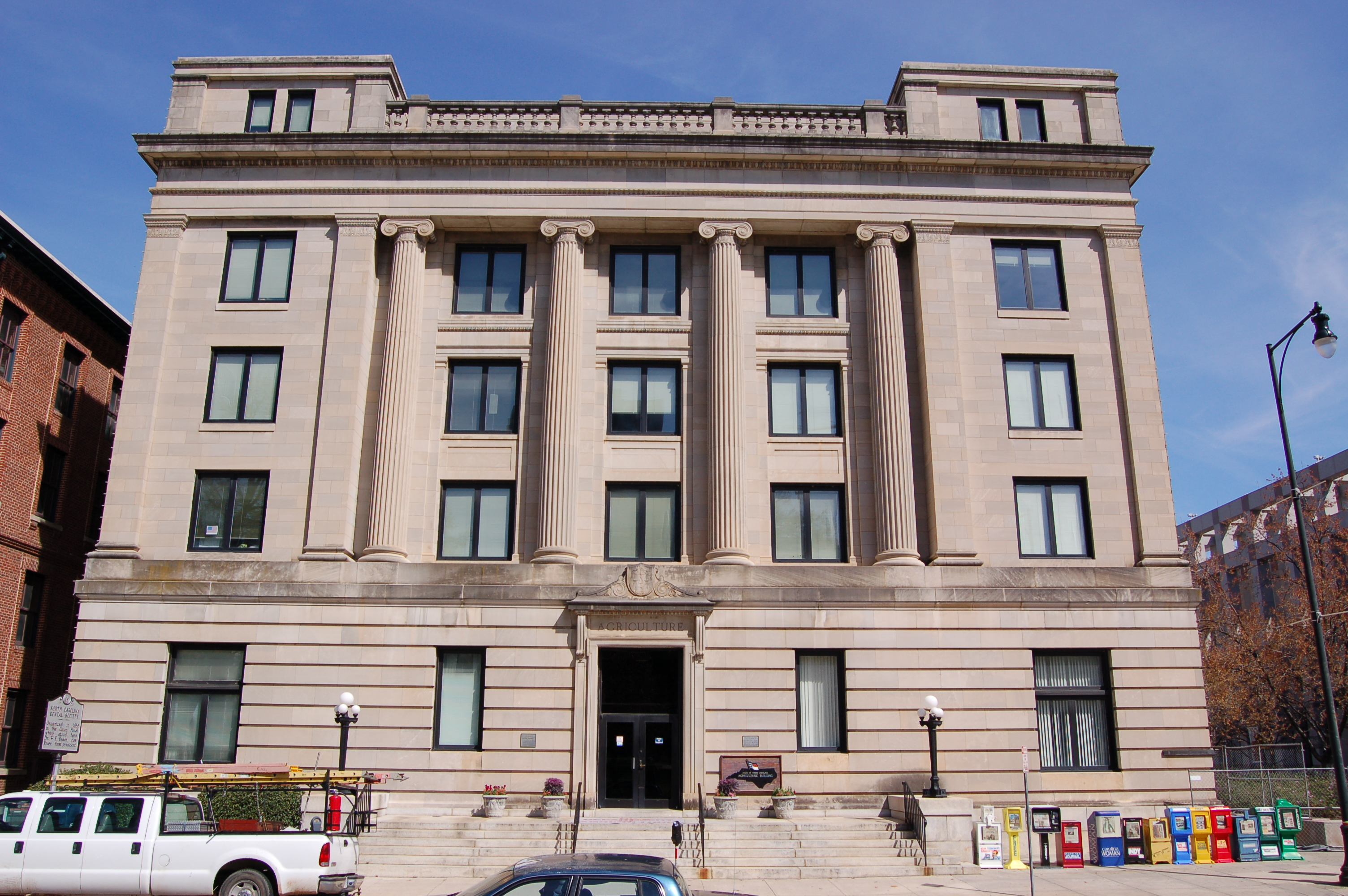
- North Carolina Department of Agriculture Building in Raleigh

Agency overview
- Jurisdiction: State of North Carolina
- Headquarters: Downtown Raleigh
- Agency executive: Steve Troxler, Commissioner of Agriculture
- Website: www.ncagr.gov

The North Carolina Department of Agriculture & Consumer Services (NCDA&CS) is a state agency of North Carolina headed by the Commissioner of Agriculture. It is headquartered in the Agriculture Building in Raleigh.

== History ==
In 1860, North Carolina Governor John W. Ellis encouraged the establishment of a board of agriculture in the state, but the North Carolina General Assembly—concerned about the possible outbreak of civil war—ignored his request. In 1868 North Carolina ratified a new constitution which provided for a Bureau of Statistics, Agriculture, and Immigration within the Office of the Secretary of State. Farmers continued to desire an independent agriculture department, and in 1875 the constitution was amended to allow the General Assembly to create an independent Department of Agriculture, Immigration, and Statistics "under such regulations as may best promote the agricultural interests of the State and shall enact laws for the adequate protection and encouragement of sheep husbandry." The assembly created the department in March 1877 under the supervision of a Board of Agriculture and a Commissioner of Agriculture, who was appointed in April. The commissioner was made an elective office in 1899.

The department expanded over the following decades. In 1936, W. Kerr Scott ran for the office of commissioner. During his campaign he pledged to bring the North Carolina State Fair under the full control of the Department of Agriculture, deriding the contemporary practice of leasing the management of the event to a third party. Scott won the election and, following his assumption of office in 1937, he successfully lobbied the state legislature to place the fair under the control of the department.

By the 21st century the department consisted of 15 divisions, including Agricultural Statistics, Agronomic Services, Aquaculture and Natural Resources, Food Distribution, Food and Drug Protection, Human Resources, Livestock Marketing, Structural Pest Control, and Veterinary Services. In recognition of the diminished importance of individual farmers in the state's economy, in 2001 the agency changed its name to the Department of Agriculture and Consumer Services.

== Responsibilities ==
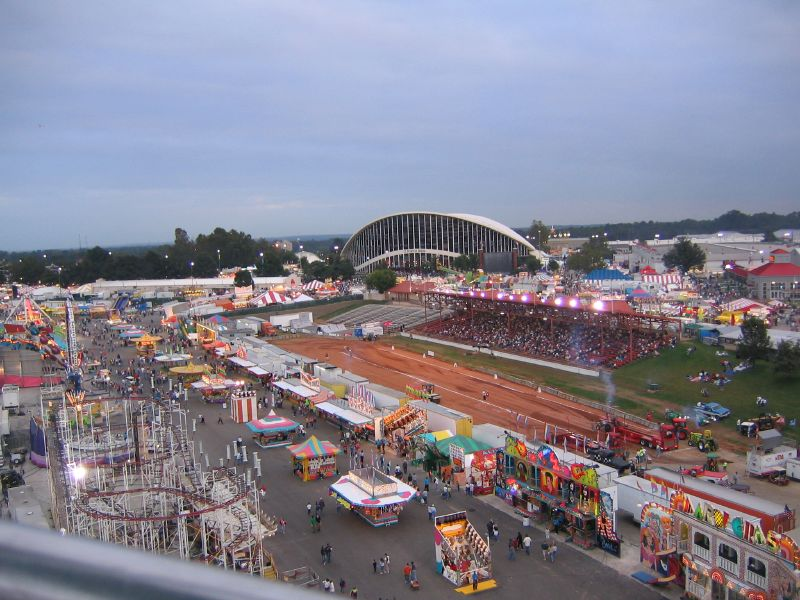
The department hosts the annual North Carolina State Fair.

The Department of Agriculture and Consumer Services is responsible for promoting agriculture in the state and enforcing various health and safety regulations through the implementation of over 75 laws and programs. It hosts the annual North Carolina State Fair and North Carolina Mountain State Fair and operates four farmers' markets and several agricultural research stations.

=== Police ===
The North Carolina Department of Agriculture and Consumer Services Police, also known as the North Carolina State Fair Police, are responsible for public safety at the State Fair. A full-time Chief of Police supervises 6 full-time Public Safety Officers, alongside part-time Public Safety Officers and part-time sworn Special Police Officers. The Department is authorised by law to appoint law enforcement officers to "enforce any violation of the laws within the authority of the Department or which occur on Department property", who have the power to arrest without warrant for crimes committed in their presence, and may obtain warrants. The Chief of Police has supervisory power over all sworn officers from any state, city or county law enforcement agency employed temporarily at the State Fair (in 2025, 54 different agencies supported the operation), and there is also an annual recruitment process for around 100 law enforcement officers to work with the Department's police force during the month of October each year. In 2022, security at the State Fair was increased, including metal detectors and bag checks.

== Structure ==
The Commissioner of Agriculture serves as head of the Department of Agriculture and Consumer Services. The North Carolina Board of Agriculture, which the commissioner chairs, is a statutory agency with its members appointed by the Governor of North Carolina. It creates rules and policies for the department. Under the commissioner are a chief deputy commissioner responsible for administration and assistant commissioners responsible for consumer protection, agricultural services, Western North Carolina agriculture programs, and the North Carolina Forest Service. The department is split into 20 divisions. As of December 2022, the department has 1,753 employees who are subject to employment terms under the State Human Resources Act. It his headquartered in the Agriculture Building in Raleigh, North Carolina.

== Gallery ==
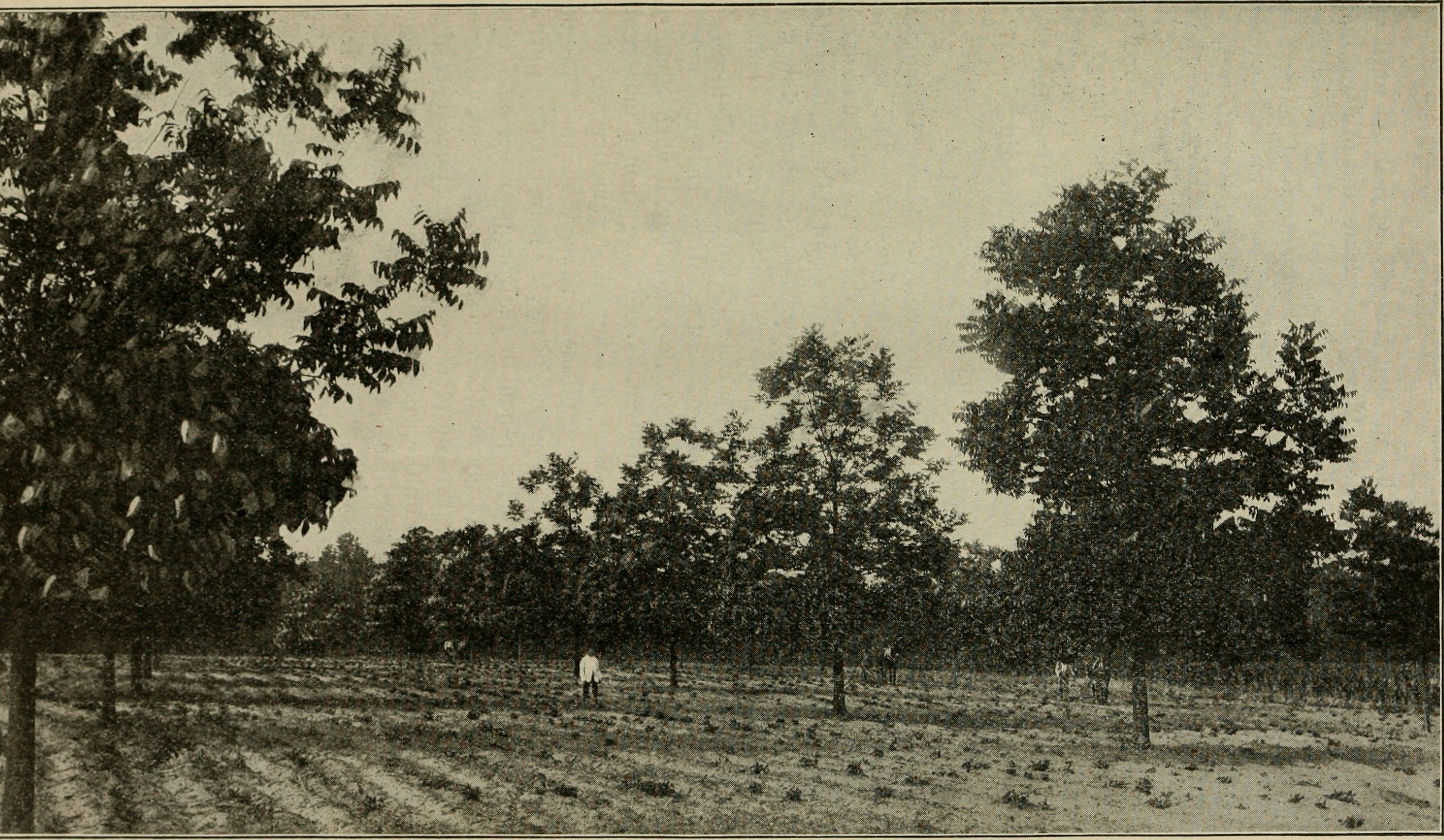
Bulletin of the North Carolina Department of Agriculture (1907-)

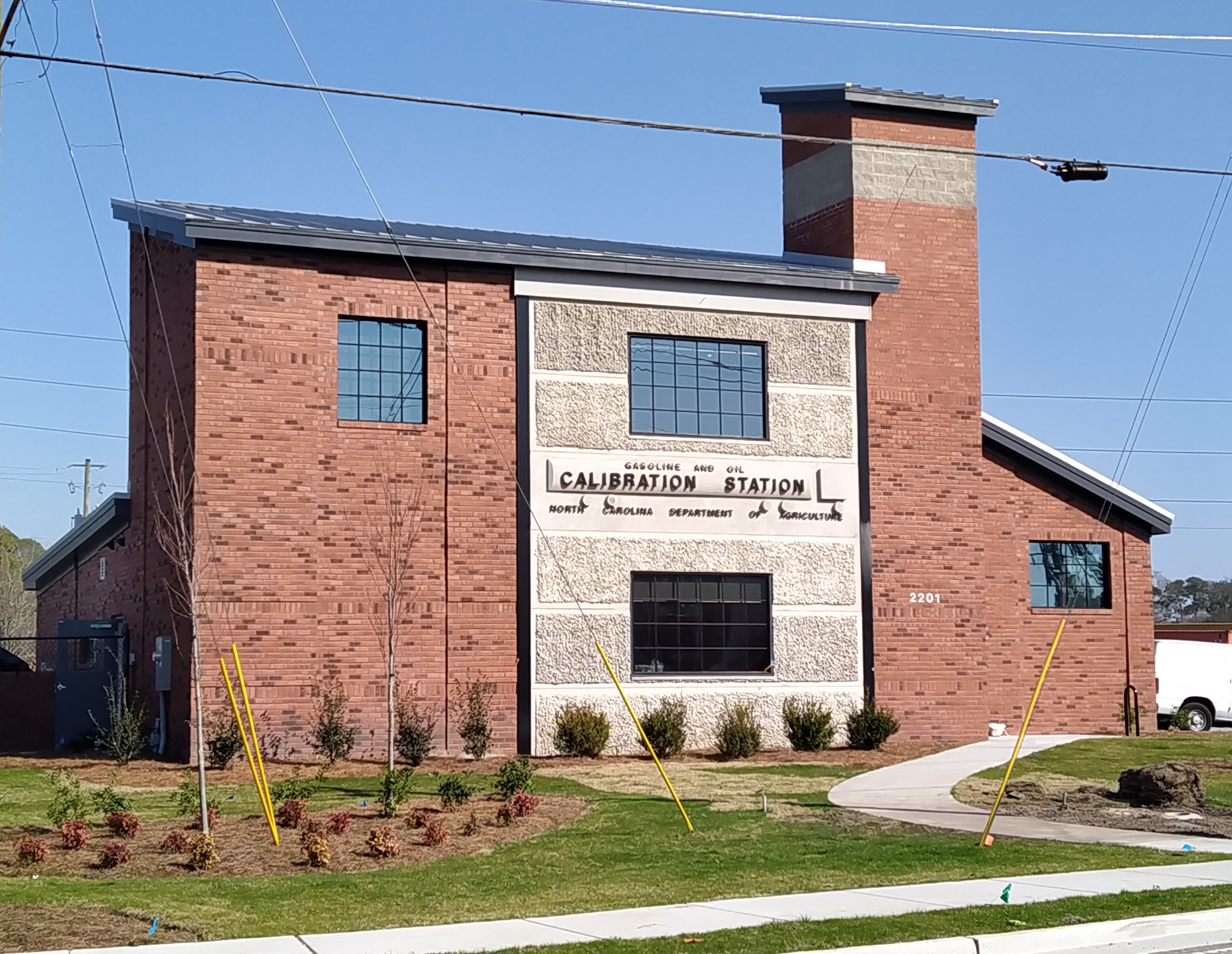
Gasoline and Oil Calibration Station, Wilmington

== See also ==
- Government of North Carolina
- Southern Farm Show

== Works cited ==
- McLaurin, Melton A. (2003). The North Carolina State Fair : The First 150 Years. Raleigh: North Carolina Office of Archives and History. ISBN 978-0-8652-6307-9.
