= North Carolina Growers Association =

Growers' cooperative based in North Carolina

The North Carolina Growers Association (NCGA) is a growers' cooperative based in the United States state of North Carolina that coordinates seasonal farm workers by utilizing the guest worker program.

== History ==
NCGA was founded by Craig Stanford "Stan" Eury, Jr in 1989. Eury was familiar with the H-2A guest worker program, formalized in 1986, from his previous work as a former state labor department official, a job he lost due to illicit cannabis cultivation. Eury has been described as the largest importer of H-2 guest workers, with other companies copying NCGA's model.

In 1990, NCGA facilitated their first cohort of 400 visa holders, which more than doubled the previous year's number of guest workers in North Carolina. By 1990, they received approval for more than 10,000 workers.

In 2001, investigations of 24 NCGA members found workplace safety violations affecting 215 workers. More than 90 workers died at Walker Farms between 2005-2015.

In 2004, the NCGA signed its first union contract covering 8,500 guest workers from Mexico. A Department of Labor audit found that NCGA had requested more visas than the number of workers requested by growers, and that the whereabouts of almost 30% visa holders was unknown.

== Reception and controversy ==
=== Reception as a stakeholder in liberalizing agricultural guest worker programs ===
The NCGA has often been quoted in news media articles on the claimed need for foreign temporary agricultural labor in the United States, and the importance of expanding the H-2A visa, with farm worker unions such as United Farm Workers cited for counterpoint. The H-2A program, and the way the NCGA uses it, have also been critiqued in publications such as Mother Jones.

Economist Michael Clemens at the Center for Global Development cited data from the NCGA, and also spoke with the association, while doing research on the H-2A visa for a policy paper. In a blog post, Clemens cited NCGA numbers: 250 Americans applied for the 7000 agricultural job openings of the NCGA, of whom 70 showed up for work and five completed the season. Clemens' paper was released by the Partnership for a New American Economy and blogged about by Michael Bloomberg and separately by Dylan Matthews for the Washington Post. The study was critiqued by North Carolina Policy Watch, that claimed that the reason the NCGA failed to hire Americans was because the state agencies they went through were apathetic to the process, rather than due to a genuine shortage of American workers.

=== Clashes with labor unions and migrant rights groups ===
The NCGA has had an acrimonious relationships with labor unions as well as some migrant rights and worker rights organizations, including Human Rights Watch and Legal Services Corporation. In the 1990's, the Farm Labor Organizing Committee criticized clauses in the NCGA contract restricting worker access to legal advocacy and making it possible for farm ownership to restrict visitors from worker housing. Workers reported being told in a NCGA orientation that Legal Services were "the enemy" and discard the 'Know your rights' booklet, with threats of retaliation if Legal Services materials were found in a worker's possession.

A 2024 investigation by The Guardian found that NCGA contracts include vague guidelines around kitchen access, with H-2A workers often required to pay for "forced meal plans" with substandard food at excessive prices following their placement at a farm.

== Media coverage ==
NCGA has been covered in the New York Times, Wall Street Journal, Forbes, and Time Magazine.

== See also ==
- Western Growers Association
- Southern Farm Show
