= North Carolina State Fair =

US state fair

Coordinates: 35.7960°N 78.7119°W

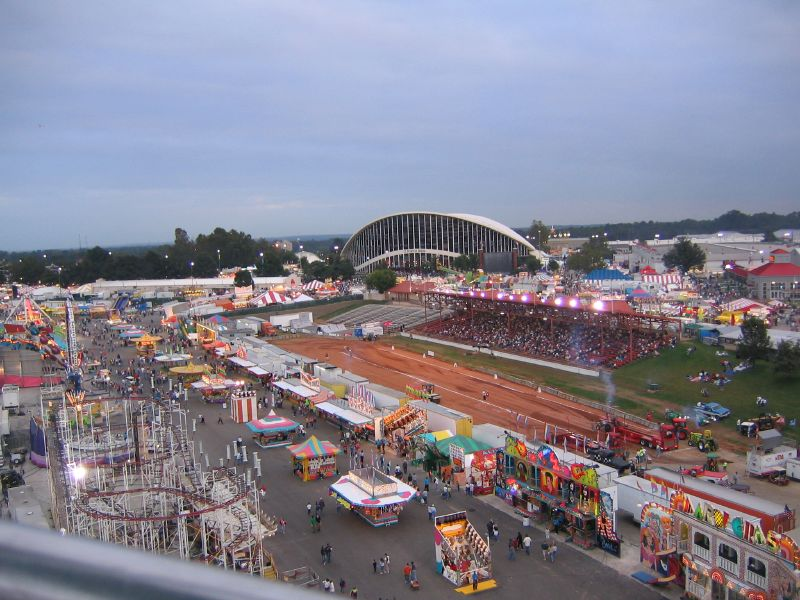
- A view from the Midway with Dorton Arena in the background.
- Genre: State fair
- Dates: 15-25 October 2026
- Frequency: annual
- Locations: 4285 Trinity Road; Raleigh, North Carolina 27607
- Country: United States
- Years active: 1853–60, 1869–1925, 1928–41, 1946–2019, 2021–
- Inaugurated: 1853
- Founders: North Carolina State Agricultural Society
- Attendance: 998,926 (2024)
- Area: 344 acres (139 ha)
- Organizer: North Carolina Department of Agriculture and Consumer Services
- Website: www.ncstatefair.org

- North Carolina State Fair Commercial & Education Buildings
- U.S. National Register of Historic Places
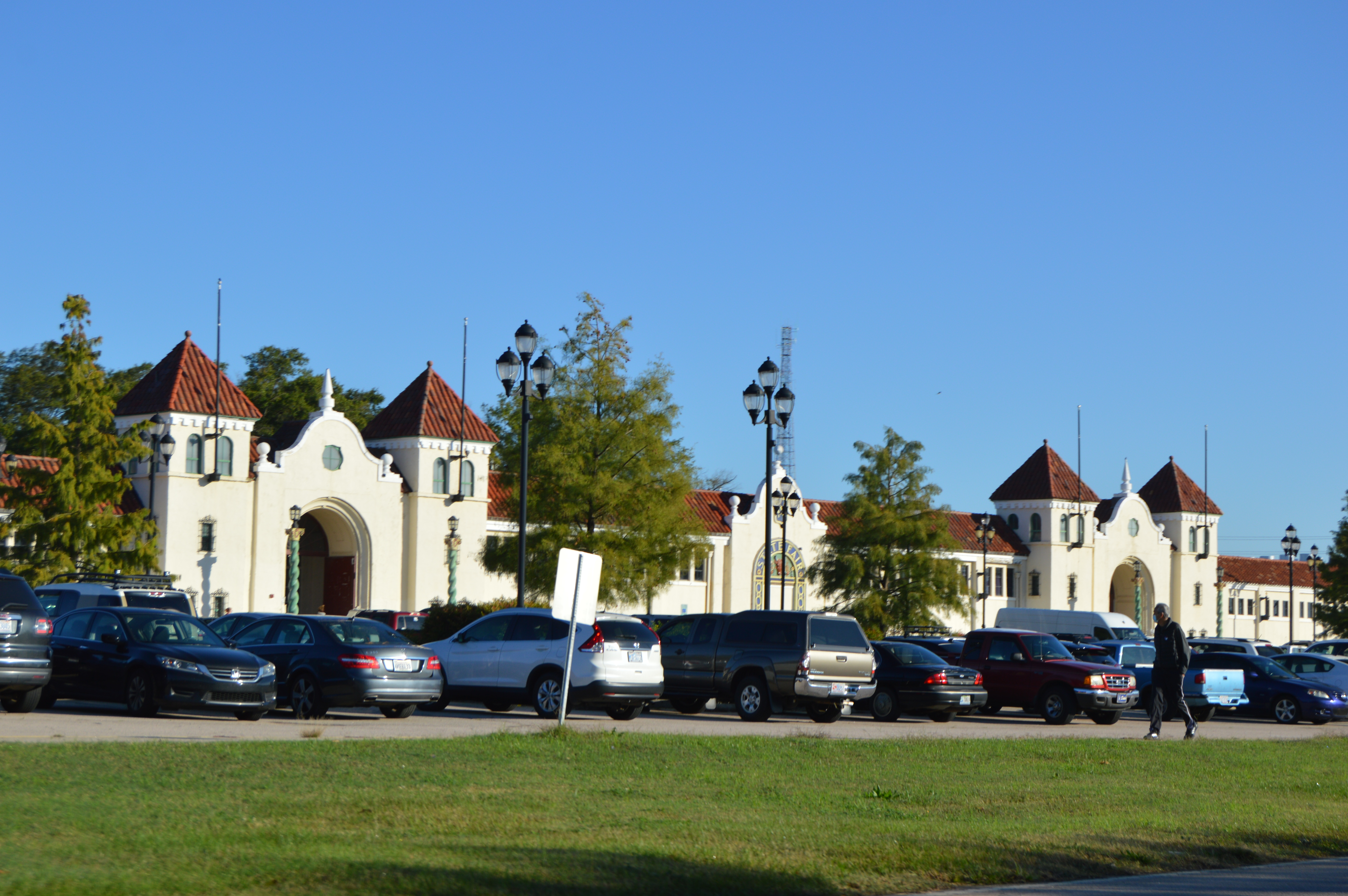
- Commercial and education buildings

- Location within North Carolina Location within the United States
- Location: NC State Fairgrounds Raleigh, North Carolina
- Built: 1928
- Architects: Atwood & Weeks; John W. Hudson
- Architectural style: Mediterranean Revival
- NRHP reference No.: 87000855
- Added to NRHP: June 5, 1987

The North Carolina State Fair is a U.S. state fair and agricultural exposition held annually in Raleigh, North Carolina. Founded in 1853, the fair is organized by the North Carolina Department of Agriculture and Consumer Services. It attracts around a million visitors over eleven days in mid-October.

The fair consists of carnival rides, agricultural exhibitions and competitions, food, music, demonstrations, and garden and craft displays. The North Carolina State Fair is one of the largest and oldest state fairs in the United States.

== History ==
The North Carolina State Agricultural Society organized the first North Carolina State Fair in 1853 at a 16 acres (6.5 ha) site east of Raleigh. This organization included some of the most influential men in North Carolina. In addition to promoting North Carolina's farmers and agricultural produce, the Agricultural Society also wanted to create an event to "attract and encourage interaction among people from all sections of the state." In this era, the fair included horse races, political oration, marching bands, and military units on parade.

In 1855, the State issued $1,500 a year to the Agricultural Society for the fair's operating expenses. Thomas Ruffin, president of the society, managed the fair from 1853 to 1859. It ceased operations from 1861 to 1868 during the Civil War and Reconstruction.

The fair reopened in 1869 under the leadership of Kemp P. Battle. In 1873, the fair moved to a new location west of Raleigh on Hillsborough Street. The City of Raleigh helped acquire the 55 acres (22 ha) site near the North Carolina Railroad. In the 1870s and 1880s, the mills in Winston-Salem would close so workers could attend the state fair in Raleigh. By the start of the 20th century, the fair featured a midway with various attractions, human and animal freak shows, hoochie coochie shows, car and horse races, and thrill shows. The fair promoted agricultural reforms, new technologies, and scientific methods to the state's farmers. In 1900, the fair's attendance was 50,000.

In 1917, a Woman's Building was added to the fairgrounds to recognize the contributions of North Carolina's women during World War I. Its dedication included an invocation by Sallie Cotton who founded the North Carolina Woman's Clubs. Other women spoke, including Jeannette Rankin, the first woman elected to the United States Congress.

Katherine Smith Reynolds was the first female executive committee member of the North Carolina State Agricultural Society, serving from 1918 to 1921. Edith Vanderbilt was the society's president from 1921 to 1924, serving as de fact fair chair and presiding over six men such as Josephus Daniels. Although adding women to the fair's board was progressive, it was also practical. Reynolds and Vanderbilt were two of the wealthiest individuals in the state. At the time, the cost of hosting the fair was increasing, and managing the mix of educational exhibits and commercial spectacles was expanding beyond the reach of a volunteer board. Vanderbilt got the fair back on a sound financial footing, "accomplishing what any number of men have failed to do."

Following her success, Vanderbilt pressed the state for more financial support, speaking to the legislature from its floor. In return, she promised new buildings, better exhibits, and more attendees. One journalist wrote, "Mrs. Vanderbilt has given time, energy, and contagious enthusiasm, and men have found pleasure in helping her see her ambitions for North Carolina realized."

Without Vanderbilt at its helm in 1925, the fair returned to shaky finances, complicated by a site that was too small. The North Carolina State Agricultural Society did not hold the fair in 1926. When the society disbanded, the State took over the fair. In 1927, the North Carolina Legislature designated 200 acres (81 ha) for new fairgrounds at the Blue Ridge Road and Hillsborough Street intersection on the west side of Raleigh. This site is still used for the North Carolina State Fair but has expanded to 344 acres (139 ha).

There was no fair in 1927 while the State developed the new fairgrounds. Wake County contributed funds for new fairgrounds buildings, supplementing the proceeds from selling the former Agricultural Society's property. The fair returned in 1928 with record crowds. New structures include livestock barns and commercial and educational buildings.

The State assigned the fair's operation to the State Board of Agriculture in 1930. That year, circus promoter George A. Hamid Sr. secured a lease to operate the fair. Hamid owned Atlantic City's Million Dollar Pier and a circus. Under his leadership, the fair's grandstand featured circus-type acts, a trend that continued through the 1960s. The fair was also a popular oratory stop for presidential candidates, including William Jennings Bryan, Franklin D. Roosevelt, and President Theodore Roosevelt.

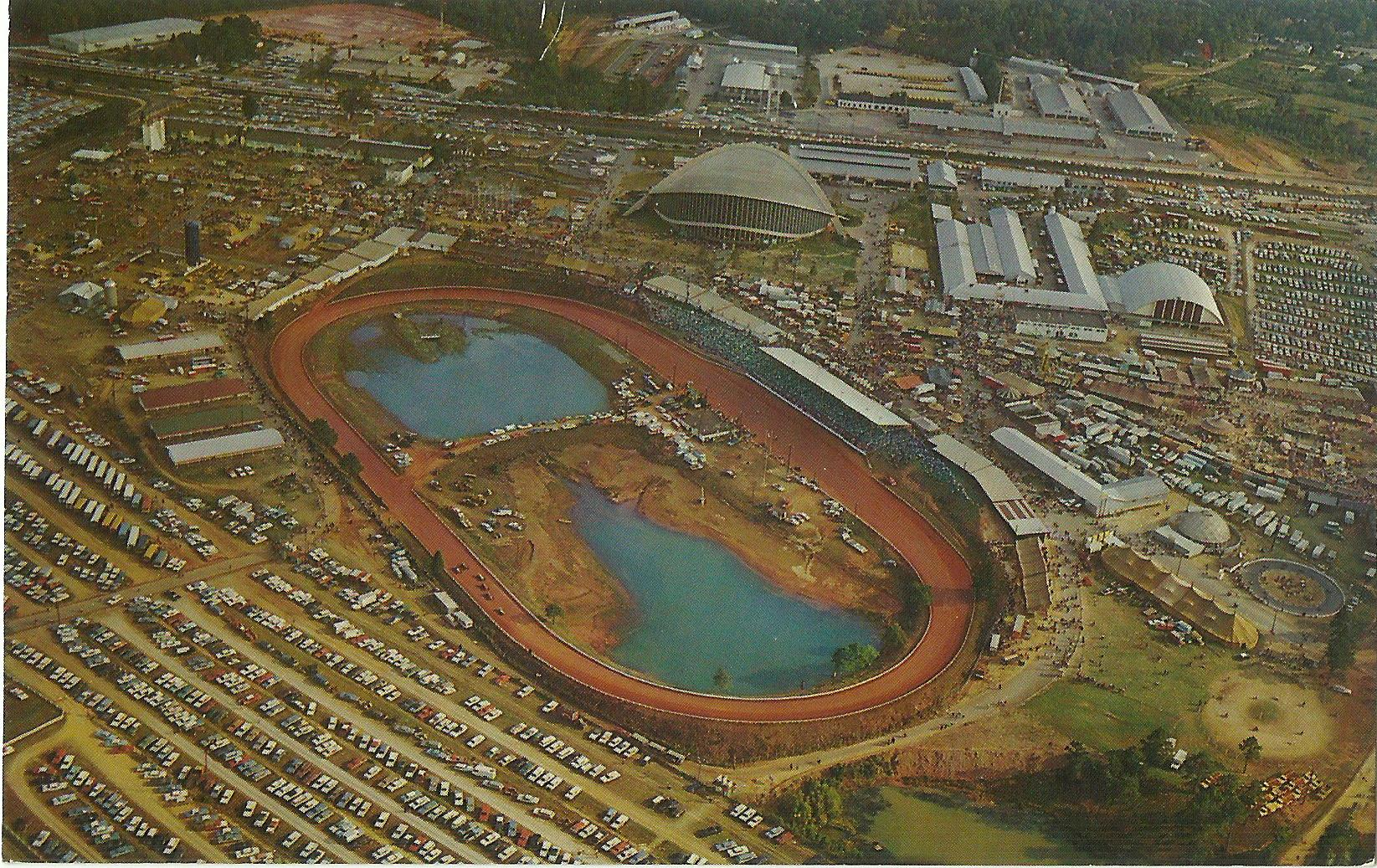
Aerial view of North Carolina State Fair, 1974

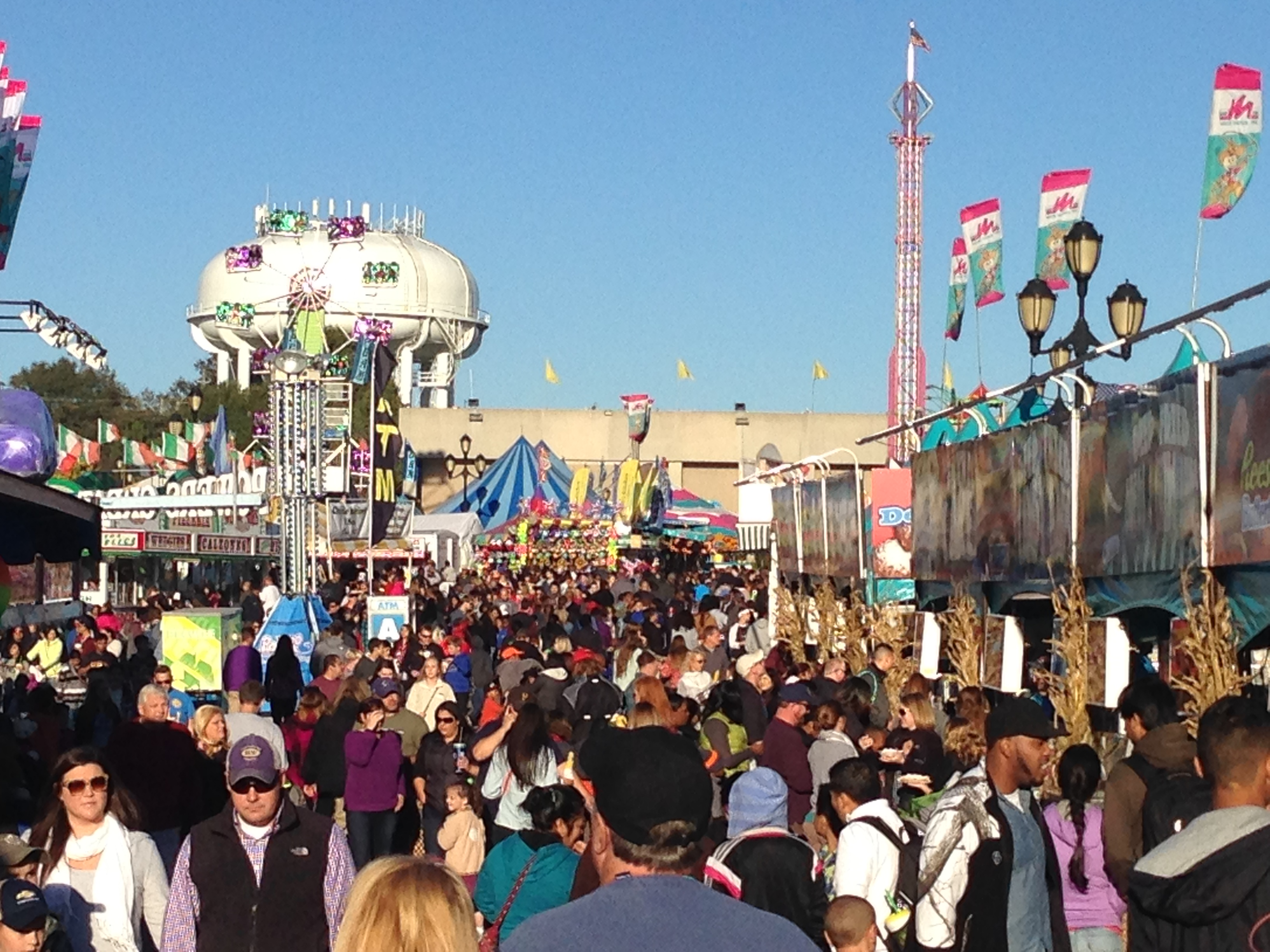
The fair midway, 2015

Hamid ran the fair until 1937, when W. Kerr Scott, the new state commissioner of agriculture, convinced the legislature to make the fair a division of the North Carolina Department of Agriculture. When Kerr ran for office, part of his platform was to return the fair to state oversight. Since 1937, the fair is part of the Department of Agriculture, now the North Carolina Department of Agriculture and Consumer Services.

The fair ceased operations between 1942 and 1945 because of World War II. Beginning in 1948, the fair contracted with the James E. Strates Shows to provide the midway rides and shows. The fair continued to be a popular stop for presidents seeking reelection, including Presidents Harry S. Truman, Gerald Ford, and George H. W. Bush.

Today, the fair is self-supporting and does not receive state funding. Its profits are reinvested in the fairgrounds. In 2010, the fair broke an attendance record with 1,091,887 visitors.

In response to the COVID-19 pandemic, the State canceled the 2020 fair. It resumed in 2021.

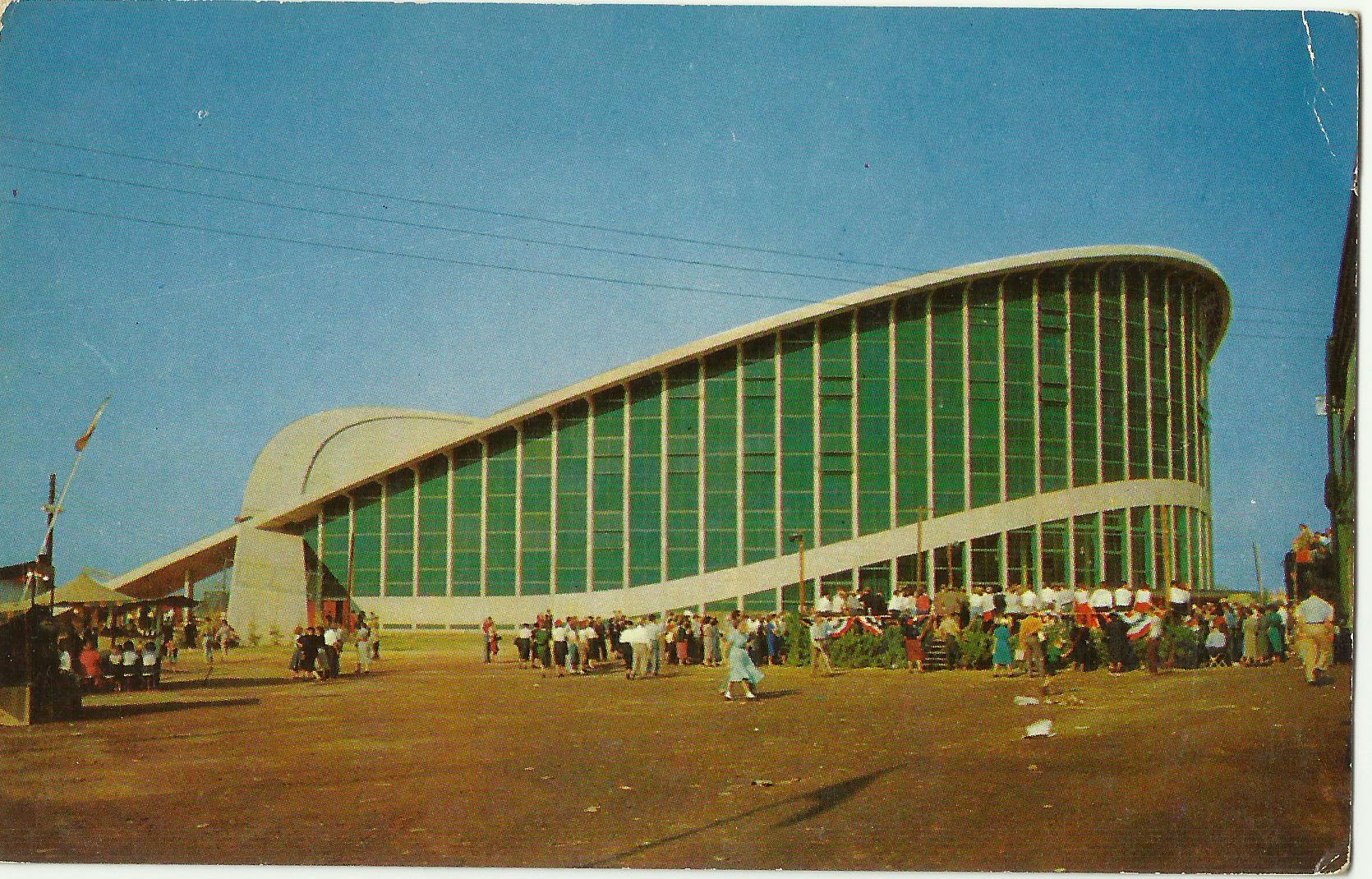
Dorton Arena during the fair, 1960s

== Buildings ==
The fairground's most significant structure is J. S. Dorton Arena, a 7,500-seat stadium designed by architects Matthew Nowicki and William Henry Deitrick in 1949. Completed in 1953 as a livestock-judging pavilion, it features a large suspended roof and was the first indoor arena designed without any columns, becoming a model for future superdome structures. Opening for the centennial of the fair's founding, Dorton Arena "became the symbol of the modern fair." In 1957, the American Institute of Architects selected it as one of ten 20th-century buildings that would shape American architecture. Dorton Arena was listed on the National Register of Historic Places in 1972 and is a Raleigh Historic Landmark and a National Historic Civil Engineering Landmark.

The North Carolina State Commercial & Education Buildings are the fairgrounds' oldest permanent buildings. Built in 1928, this pair of rectangular exhibition halls are in Spanish Mission Revival style or Mediterranean Revival style. Atwood and Weeks, an architectural firm from Durham, designed the stucco-covered buildings. The twin buildings appear as a single structure because of their unified façade with tower-flanked entrances and glazed terra cotta ornamentation. Together, this building complex is 504 feet (154 m) in length and 80 feet (24 m) in depth. It was listed on the National Register of Historic Places in 1987 and is a Raleigh Historic Landmark.

The 100,000 square feet (9,300 m^{2}) Jim Graham Building, the Governor James E. Holshouser Building, and the Governor W. Kerr Scott Building became part of the fairgrounds in the 1970s. Newer additions include the 50,000 square feet (4,600 m^{2}) Agri-Supply Exposition Center, the Sam G. Rand Grandstand (formerly the State Fairgrounds Speedway), the 30 acres (12 ha) Governor James B. Hunt Jr. Horse Complex, and the new James Robert "Bob" Stanfield Natural Resources Center. The fairgrounds also contain the Pitzer Heritage Circle and the Heritage Tobacco Pavilion.

Safety and security are provided year-round by the North Carolina Department of Agriculture and Consumer Services Police, also known as the North Carolina State Fair Police, with an increase in officers at the time of the fair.

== Exhibits ==
The fair includes many exhibits, including the Antique Farm Machinery exhibit, the Flower and Garden Show, the North Carolina Forest Service and North Carolina Soil and Water Conservation exhibit, and the North Carolina Wildlife Resources Commission exhibit. The Field of Dreams is a mini-farm where children can see how food is grown, taste produce, and watch a rabbit race. Got to Be NC Agriculture features cooking demonstrations, pop-up cooking contests, and free food samples.

The Heritage Circle consists of historic buildings, blacksmith and gristmill demonstrations, and samples of apple cider and hush puppies. The Village of Yesteryear features artists and crafters creating, displaying, and selling handmade crafts. The State Fair Ark has more than fifty animals on display, including cattle, goats, sheep, and swine.

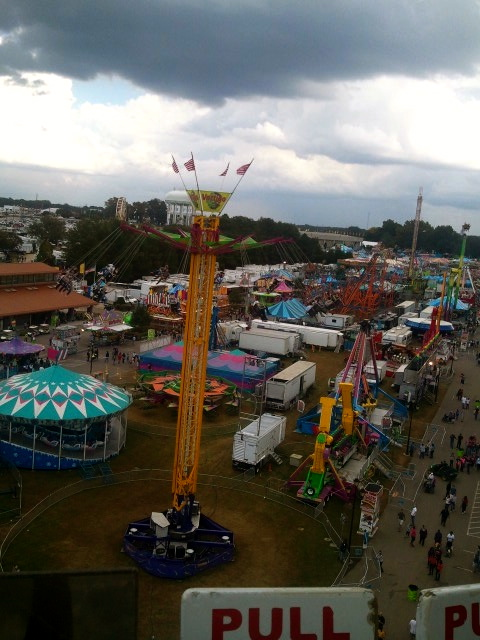
Midway view from Ferris wheel

== Competitions ==
The state fair provides ample opportunities for North Carolinians to enter competitions, with some 36,000 entries in 2021. The fair awards prizes for artwork, cake decorating, canned food, floral arrangements, cut flowers, garden design, handicrafts, home furnishings, quilting, shoe decorating, and terrarium building. In addition, judges review honey, produce, livestock, poultry, and rabbits. There is also a Heritage Tobacco Harvest Competition.

Newer competitive categories include Christmas tree decorations, graphic design, and robotics. There is also a Home Chef Challenge and competitions for apprentices in carpentry, cosmetology, electrical, HVAC, masonry, and plumbing. Winners receive cash prizes.

The North Carolina State Fair Horse Show and Hunter Jumper Show takes place before, during, and after the fair at the Governor James B. Hunt Horse Complex.

The Folk Festival was first held at the fair in 1948 to showcase North Carolina's traditional music and dance. More than 1,500 people participate yearly for the coveted Bascom Lamar Lunsford Trophy, named after the festival's founder.

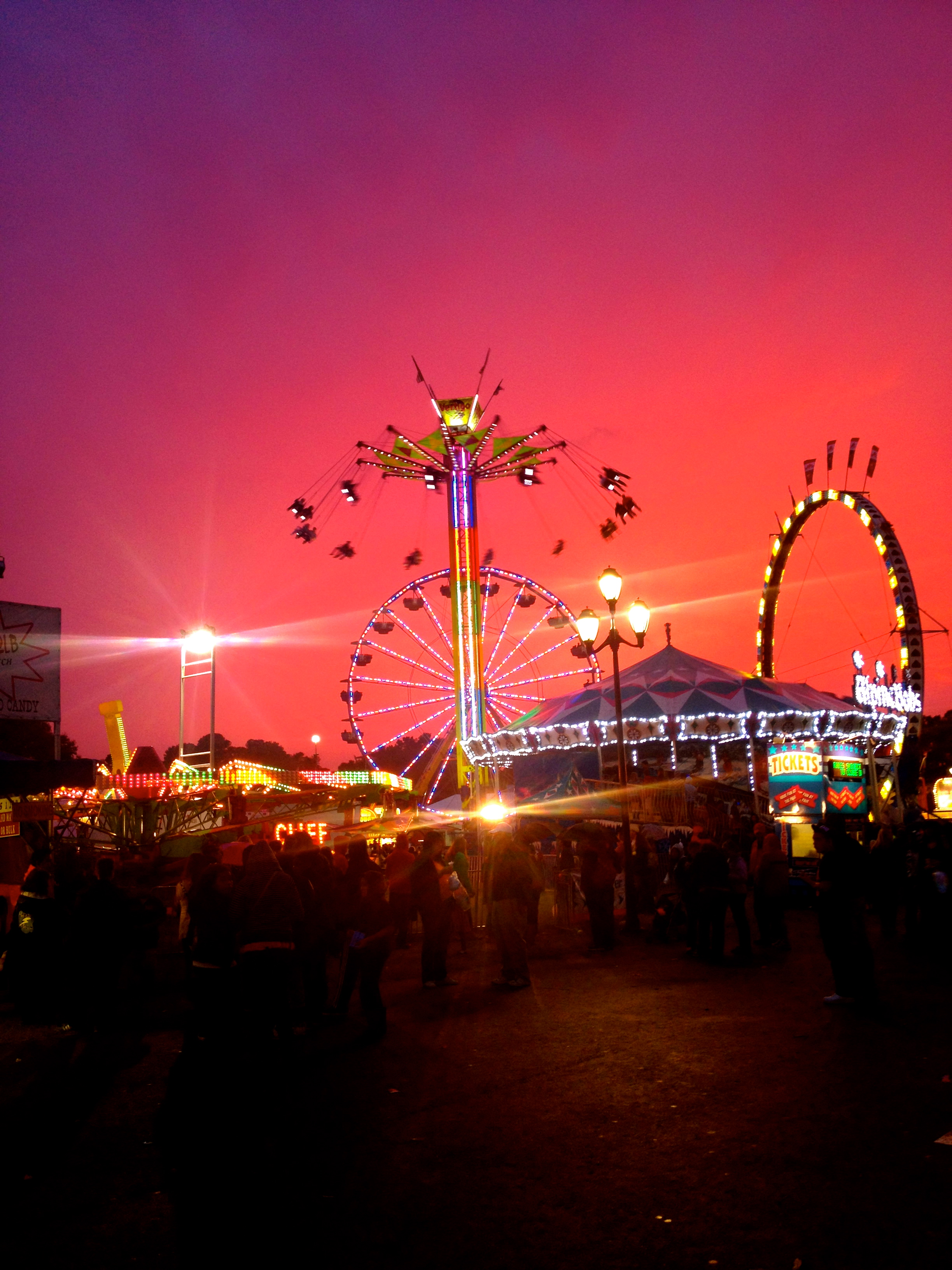
Midway at sunset

== Entertainment ==
=== Carnival rides ===
In 2004, Powers Great American Midways, based out of Burgaw, North Carolina, won the midway contract for the fair. Powers Great American Midways and Wade Shows provide more than 100 rides, carnival games, and concessions on the midway. One of the rides is the SkyGazer, the largest traveling Ferris wheel in the United States; it seats 200 people and is 150 feet (46 m) tall.

=== Live Music ===
Traditionally, Dorton Arena has nightly concerts, showcasing country, rock, and R&B music. Past acts include American Aquarium, Clay Aiken, The Carolina Chocolate Drops, Dillon Fence, Florida Georgia Line, Hot Chelle Rae, Joan Jett and the Blackhearts, Kansas, Chris Lane, Kimberly Locke, Toby Mac, Pure Prairie League, Sister Hazel, Skillet, and Superchunk. For 2022, the fair decided to use Dorton Arena for non-music events.

The Homegrown Music Festival features more than 100 concerts by local musical acts on two stages throughout the day.

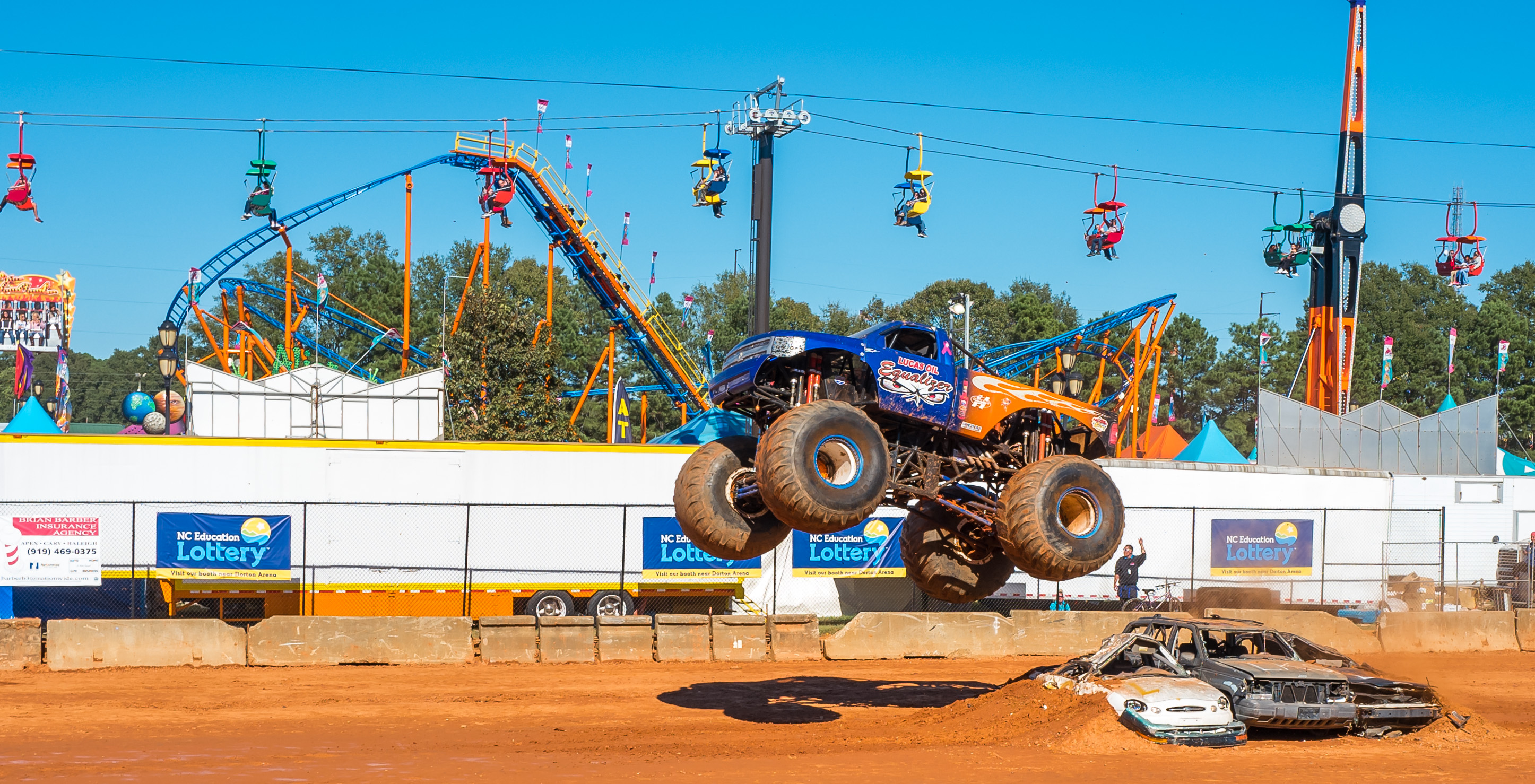
Monster Truck Destruction Derby at the fair, 2016

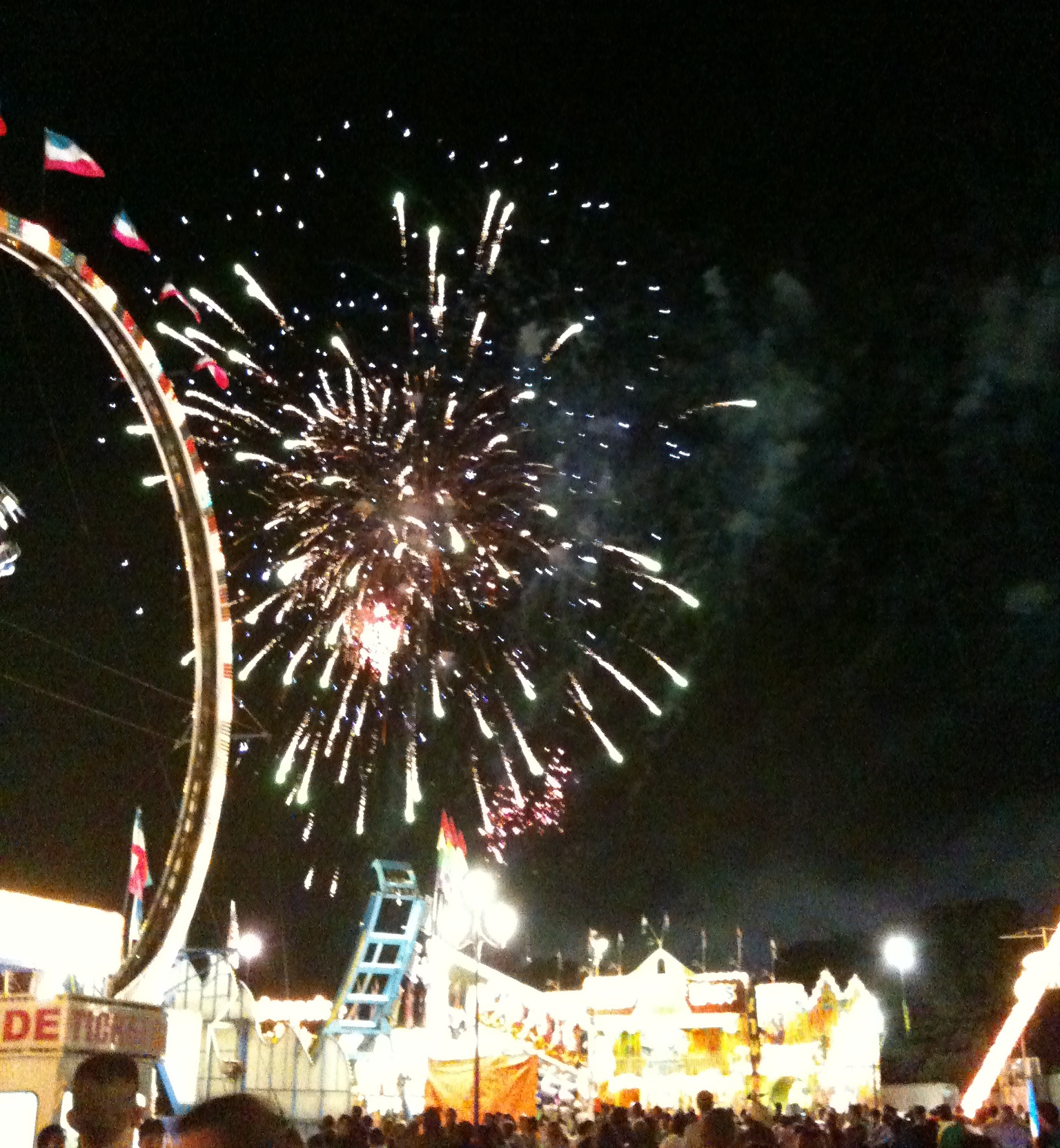
Fireworks at the fair, 2009

=== Shows and events ===
The Sam Rand Grandstand hosts special events, including the Tractor Pull, the Demolition Derby, the Canine Stars, and the King Action Sports Stunt Show. Other popular acts include the Paul Bunyan Lumberjack Show, racing pigs at Hogway Speedway, and various roaming acts. The Kiddieland Fun Park caters to children with stage shows and attractions. There are also nightly fireworks displays.

=== The State Fair Flyer ===
Introduced in 2016, the State Fair Flyer is a 40 feet (12 m) high sky chairlift ride with 126 seats that hang from a cable stretching more than 1,400 feet (430 m) across the fairgrounds. The ride moves 2 miles per hour (3.2 km/h) and lasts ten minutes. American Sky Lifts, based in Sanford, owns and built the massive machine for one million dollars. The fair has a ten-year lease for the lift with an option for a ten-year renewal.

== Amtrak station ==
During the fair, NC By Train establishes a temporary train station adjoining the fair grounds, which is served by Amtrak's Carolinian and Piedmont.

== Accidents and incidents ==
On October 24, 2013, five people received injuries when the Vortex ride restarted as they exited the ride, operated by Powers Great American Midways. The injured ranged in age between 14 and 39 and were all hospitalized—some with serious injuries. On October 29, 2013, the operator of the ride, Timothy Dwayne Tutterow, was charged with three felony counts of assault with a deadly weapon for inflicting serious bodily injury in connection with the accident. In June 2015, Tutterow pled guilty but was not sentenced as part of a plea arrangement to testify against the ride owner, Joshua Gene Macaroni. On February 19, 2016, Macaroni served thirty days in jail.

== Other resources ==
- McLaurin, Melton Alonza. The North Carolina State Fair: The First 150 Years. Raleigh: Office of Archives and History, N.C. Department of Cultural Resources, 2003. ISBN 9780865263079
