= Louisville Shooting Stars =

American ice hockey team

The Louisville Shooting Stars were a minor league professional ice hockey team that played in the International Hockey League during the 1953–54 season. The Shooting Stars were based in Louisville, Kentucky and played at the Louisville Gardens.

== Season-by-season results ==
Season	Games	Won	Lost	Tied	Points	Winning %	Goals for	Goals against	Standing
1953–54	64	18	42	4	40	0.312	202	331	8th of 9 teams

== See also ==
- Sports in Louisville, Kentucky
