= Davis Arena =

Davis Arena may refer to

- Hotpoint Davis Arena, a professional wrestling arena in Louisville, Kentucky owned by Ohio Valley Wrestling
- The ArenA, a professional wrestling arena in Jeffersonville, Indiana owned by Anthony Borcherding formerly known as the Davis Arena
