= Maciej Nowicki (architect) =

Polish architect (1910–1950)

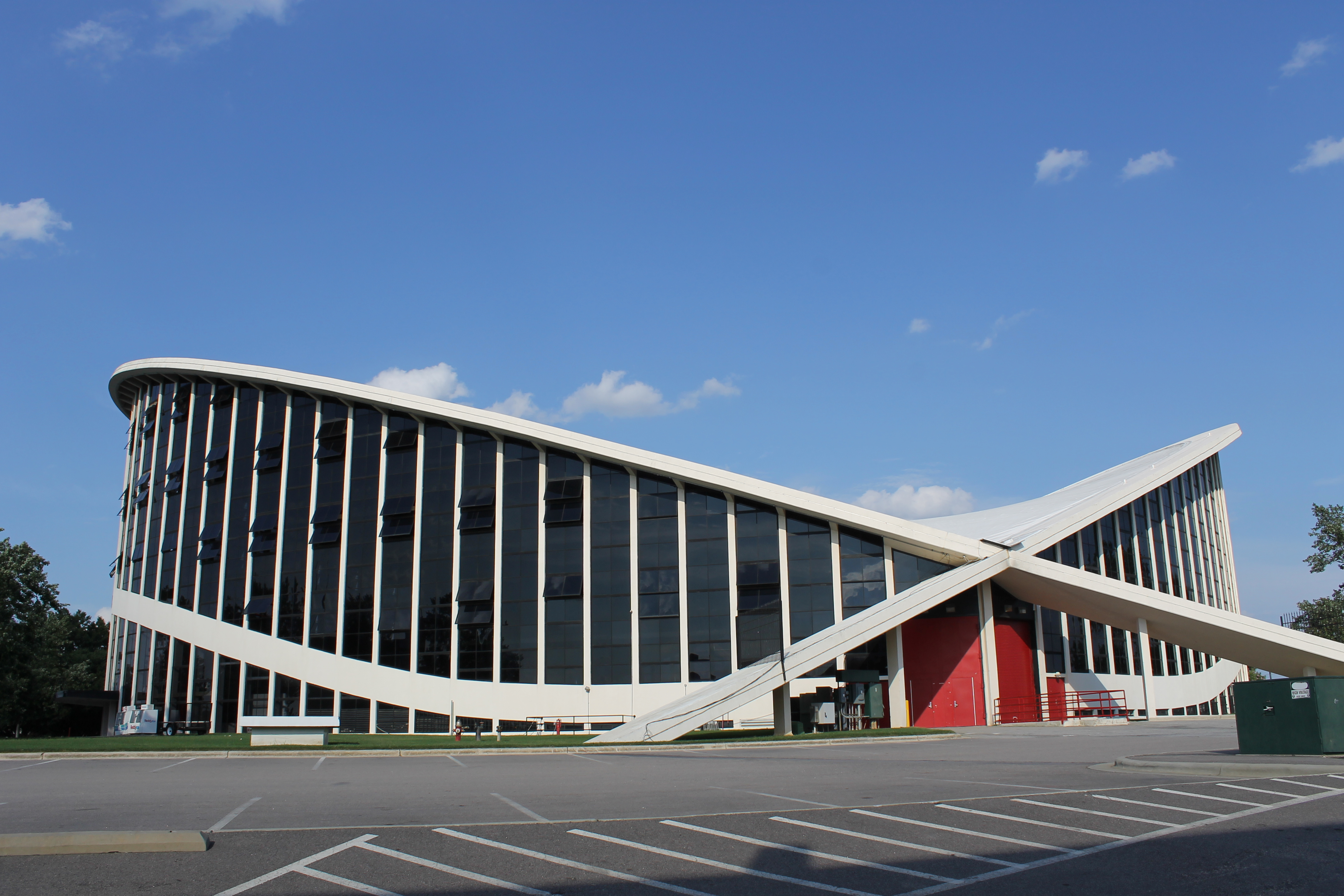
Dorton Arena in Raleigh designed by Nowicki

Matthew Nowicki (in Poland known as Maciej Nowicki; 26 June 1910 – 1 September 1950) was a Polish architect. He was the chief architect of the new Indian city of Chandigarh.

== Career ==
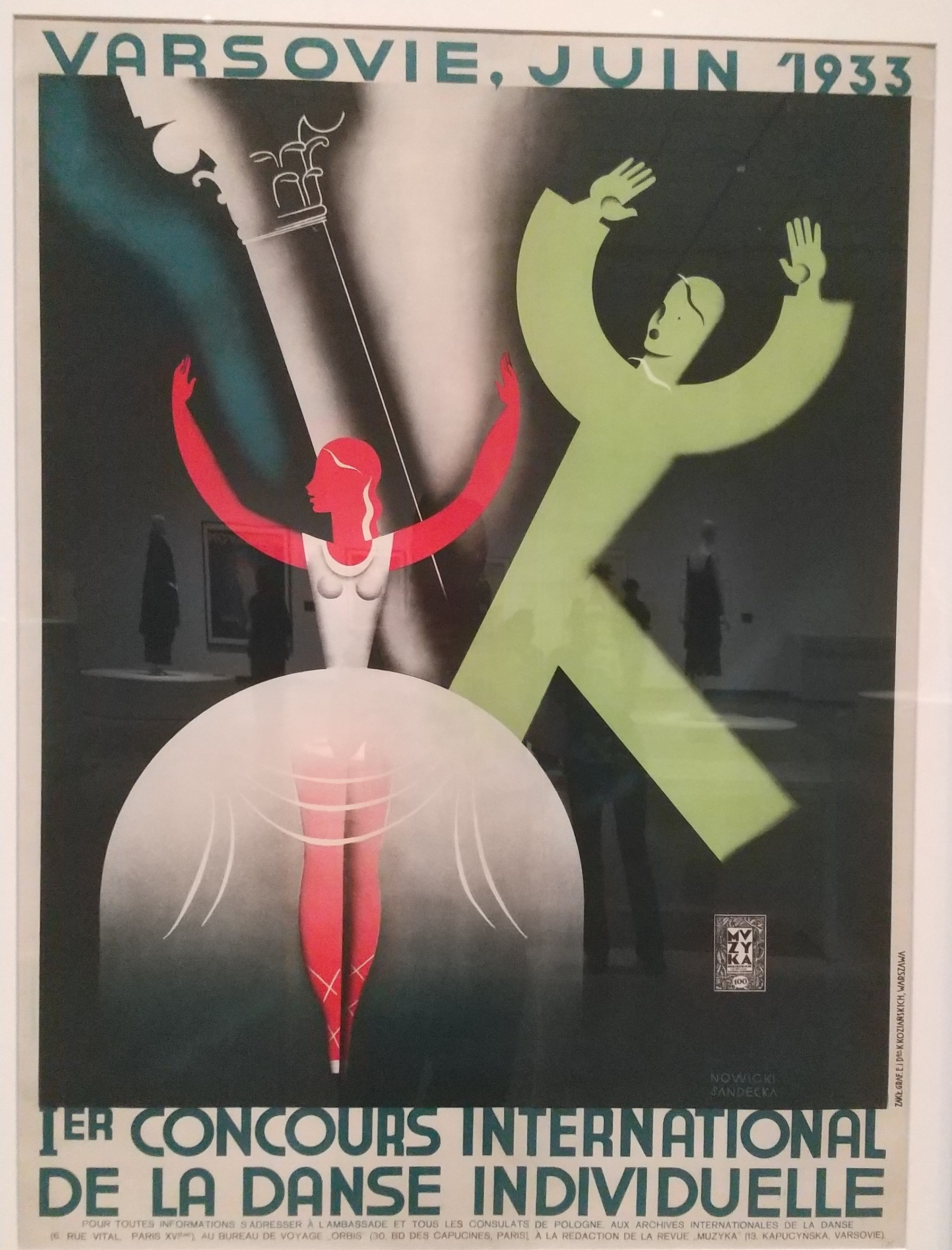
Maciej Nowicki, IER International Dance Competition, 1933

Nowicki was born in Chita in Siberia. After the Second World War he received a commission to work on plans for the reconstruction of Poland's capital city, Warsaw. In December 1945 he was posted to New York City as an official delegate of the Polish state, to advertise the rebuilding of Poland.

Nowicki was the architect of the J. S. Dorton Arena in Raleigh built in 1952 after his death. He was a member of the 'Workshop of Peace' team working on the United Nations Headquarters. He was a chair of the Faculty of Architecture at North Carolina State University.

His wife, Stanislawa Nowicki (Polish: Nowicka), was also an architect who taught from 1951 to 1977 at the University of Pennsylvania.

== Death ==
Nowicki died around midnight on 31 August/1 September 1950, in the crash of Trans World Airlines Flight 903 near Wadi Natrun in the Western Desert of Egypt. He had been returning from India where he was chief architect designing the new city of Chandigarh.
