= Louisville Shooters =

- League: GBA
- Founded: 1991
- Folded: 1992
- History: Louisville Shooters 1991–1992
- Location: Louisville, Kentucky
- Team colors: red and gold
- Head coach: Johnny Neumann
- Championships: 0

Louisville Shooters was a team from Louisville, Kentucky that competed in the Global Basketball Association during its inaugural 1991–1992 season and folded three games into its second season.

The Louisville Shooters played their home games in the Louisville Gardens and their team colors were red and gold.

The Shooters played through the GBA's first season and ended with a record of 35-29 (.547) which put them in second place in the Western Division, 7 games behind the Mid-Michigan Great Lakers. The Shooters advanced to the playoffs but forfeited to the Mid-Michigan Great Lakers in the first round due to financial problems. Louisville's Alfredrick Hughes made the All GBA team. Former Ole Miss and American Basketball Association star Johnny Neumann was the head coach.

The Shooters began the 1992–1993 season with three straight losses before disbanding in midseason (the only GBA team to fold before the league itself folded in December 1992). They had previously signed Sean Woods. The Shooters never returned to league play.

== See also ==
- Sports in Louisville, Kentucky
