= Ron Carter (ice hockey) =

Canadian ice hockey player (born 1958)

- Born: March 14, 1958 (age 68) Montreal, Quebec, Canada
- Height: 6 ft 1 in (185 cm)
- Weight: 205 lb (93 kg; 14 st 9 lb)
- Position: Right wing
- Shot: Left
- Played for: Edmonton Oilers
- NHL draft: 36th overall, 1978; Montreal Canadiens
- Playing career: 1978–1986

Ronald Carter (born March 14, 1958) is a Canadian former professional ice hockey right winger.

== Early life ==
Carter was born in Montreal. He played junior ice hockey for the Sherbrooke Castors of the Quebec Major Junior Hockey League.

== Career ==
Carter was drafted by the Montreal Canadiens in the second round of the 1978 NHL entry draft. His rights were acquired by the expansion Edmonton Oilers, and he played two games for the Oilers in the 1979–80 season. Carter played only two games in the National Hockey League and went on to have a long career in minor professional leagues.

== Career statistics ==
=== Regular season and playoffs ===
			Regular season					Playoffs
Season	Team	League	GP	G	A	Pts	PIM	GP	G	A	Pts	PIM
1975–76	Sherbrooke Castors	QMJHL	65	34	36	70	12	9	2	2	4	7
1976–77	Sherbrooke Castors	QMJHL	72	77	50	127	16	18	12	18	30	21
1976–77	Sherbrooke Castors	MC	—	—	—	—	—	4	1	1	2	0
1977–78	Sherbrooke Castors	QMJHL	71	88	86	174	28	10	10	7	17	2
1978–79	Dallas Black Hawks	CHL	54	22	16	38	8	7	2	2	4	6
1978–79	Springfield Indians	AHL	1	0	0	0	0	—	—	—	—	—
1979–80	Edmonton Oilers	NHL	2	0	0	0	0	—	—	—	—	—
1979–80	Houston Apollos	CHL	76	40	30	70	17	4	2	1	3	0
1980–81	Erie Blades	EHL	38	23	21	44	6	—	—	—	—	—
1980–81	Rochester Americans	AHL	38	31	19	50	8	—	—	—	—	—
1981–82	Rochester Americans	AHL	12	6	4	10	0	—	—	—	—	—
1981–82	Flint Spirits	IHL	49	29	23	52	2	4	0	0	0	5
1982–83	Nashville South Stars	ACHL	58	47	49	96	21	—	—	—	—	—
1983–84	Nashville South Stars	ACHL	62	51	59	110	20	4	1	2	3	10
1984–85	Virginia Lancers	ACHL	57	56	48	104	10	4	1	2	3	2
1985–86	Virginia Lancers	ACHL	20	14	13	27	2	—	—	—	—	—
1985–86	Mohawk Valley Comets	ACHL	32	34	18	52	4	6	2	5	7	0
CHL totals			130	62	46	108	25	11	4	3	7	5
AHL totals			51	37	23	60	8	—	—	—	—	—
ACHL totals			229	202	187	389	57	14	4	9	13	12

=== International ===
Year	Team	Event	GP	G	A	Pts	PIM
1976	Canada	WJC	4	0	0	0	0
