= Jeff Eatough =

Canadian ice hockey player (born 1963)

- Born: June 2, 1963 (age 62) Toronto, Ontario, Canada
- Height: 5 ft 9 in (175 cm)
- Weight: 170 lb (77 kg; 12 st 2 lb)
- Position: Right Wing
- Shot: Left
- Played for: Buffalo Sabres
- NHL draft: 80th overall, 1981; Buffalo Sabres
- Playing career: 1982–1988

Jeffrey Eatough (born June 2, 1963) is a Canadian former professional ice hockey right winger. He played one game in the National Hockey League with the Buffalo Sabres, on March 25, 1982 against the Boston Bruins. The rest of his career, which lasted from 1982 to 1988, was spent in various minor leagues. Internationally he played for the Canadian national junior team at the 1981 World Junior Championships.

== Biography ==
As a youth, Eatough played in the 1976 Quebec International Pee-Wee Hockey Tournament with a minor ice hockey team from Toronto.

Eatough was a star in the Ontario Hockey League, finishing seventh in the league with 53 goals in the 1981–82 season while playing for the Cornwall Royals.

He was drafted in the fourth round, 80th overall, by the Buffalo Sabres in the 1981 NHL entry draft. He played just one game in the National Hockey League with the Sabres as an 18-year-old during the 1981–82 season. He did not register a point.

Later in his career, he finished sixth in the Atlantic Coast Hockey League in scoring during the 1986–87 season, tallying 43 goals and 42 assists for the Mohawk Valley Comets.

== Career statistics ==
=== Regular season and playoffs ===
			Regular season					Playoffs
Season	Team	League	GP	G	A	Pts	PIM	GP	G	A	Pts	PIM
1979–80	Aurora Tigers	OPJAHL	40	16	25	41	186	—	—	—	—	—
1979–80	Niagara Falls Flyers	OMJHL	6	0	1	1	4	—	—	—	—	—
1980–81	Cornwall Royals	QMJHL	68	30	42	72	147	18	5	7	12	52
1980–81	Cornwall Royals	M-Cup	—	—	—	—	—	5	0	3	3	12
1981–82	Cornwall Royals	OHL	66	53	37	90	180	5	0	5	5	21
1981–82	Buffalo Sabres	NHL	1	0	0	0	0	—	—	—	—	—
1982–83	Cornwall Royals	OHL	9	5	3	8	18	—	—	—	—	—
1982–83	North Bay Centennials	OHL	50	25	24	49	73	8	2	5	7	12
1983–84	Rochester Americans	AHL	24	1	5	6	5	—	—	—	—	—
1983–84	Flint Generals	IHL	5	4	1	5	6	—	—	—	—	—
1984–85	Flint Generals	IHL	4	0	1	1	0	—	—	—	—	—
1984–85	Mohawk Valley Stars	ACHL	42	27	33	60	37	—	—	—	—	—
1984–85	Pinebridge Bucks	ACHL	12	4	8	12	31	—	—	—	—	—
1985–86	Flint Generals	IHL	4	1	0	1	2	—	—	—	—	—
1985–86	Mohawk Valley Comets	ACHL	27	18	19	37	43	6	5	8	13	4
1986–87	Mohawk Valley Comets	ACHL	53	43	42	85	93	13	5	7	12	46
1987–88	Carolina Thunderbirds	AAHL	9	3	8	11	16	—	—	—	—	—
ACHL totals			134	92	102	194	204	19	10	15	25	50
NHL totals			1	0	0	0	0	—	—	—	—	—

=== International ===
Year	Team	Event	GP	G	A	Pts	PIM
1981	Canada	WJC	5	1	2	3	4
Junior totals			5	1	2	3	4

== See also ==
- List of players who played only one game in the NHL
