= Chris Pusey =

Canadian ice hockey player (born 1965)

- Born: July 20, 1965 (age 60) Brantford, Ontario, Canada
- Height: 6 ft 0 in (183 cm)
- Weight: 180 lb (82 kg; 12 st 12 lb)
- Position: Goaltender
- Caught: Left
- Played for: Detroit Red Wings
- NHL draft: 106th overall, 1983; Detroit Red Wings
- Playing career: 1985–2004

Chris Pusey (born July 20, 1965) is a Canadian former professional ice hockey goaltender. He is notable for returning after retiring from professional ice hockey, with the Dundas Real McCoys, an OHA senior team, and the club made the final four in the Allan Cup tournament. Chris, however, was playing not as a goaltender, but as a defenceman. As a child, Chris was known to friends and family as "Gigger".

Chris was called up by the Detroit Red Wings in October 1985, after starter Eddie Mio went down with a knee injury. He made his only NHL appearance on October 19, 1985, against Chicago. Starter Corrado Micalef allowed three goals in the first period. Pusey entered the game and Detroit pulled to within one goal after two periods; however, three Chicago goals in the third (including the first NHL goal by defenceman Marc Bergevin) would end the Red Wing comeback bid.

== Career statistics ==
=== Regular season and playoffs ===
			Regular season									Playoffs
Season	Team	League	GP	W	L	T	MIN	GA	SO	GAA	SV%	GP	W	L	MIN	GA	SO	GAA	SV%
1982–83	London Knights	OHL	1	0	1	0	60	7	0	7.00	—	—	—	—	—	—	—	—	—
1982–83	Brantford Alexanders	OHL	20	5	11	0	991	85	0	5.15	—	—	—	—	—	—	—	—	—
1983–84	Brantford Alexanders	OHL	50	26	18	2	2858	158	2	3.32	—	5	0	1	300	17	0	3.40	—
1984–85	Hamilton Steelhawks	OHL	49	17	19	2	2450	179	1	4.38	—	15	7	6	824	73	0	5.32	—
1985–86	Adirondack Red Wings	AHL	22	7	12	1	1171	76	1	3.89	.860	1	0	0	27	4	0	8.89	—
1985–86	Detroit Red Wings	NHL	1	0	0	0	40	3	0	4.50	.750	—	—	—	—	—	—	—	—
1986–87	Adirondack Red Wings	AHL	11	4	5	0	617	40	0	3.89	.866	—	—	—	—	—	—	—	—
1986–87	Indianapolis Checkers	IHL	6	1	4	0	330	36	0	6.55	.804	—	—	—	—	—	—	—	—
1986–87	Carolina Thunderbirds	ACHL	4	—	—	—	238	20	0	5.04	—	—	—	—	—	—	—	—	—
1989–90	Winston-Salem Thunderbirds	ECHL	3	2	1	0	180	13	0	4.33	.863	—	—	—	—	—	—	—	—
1991–92	Brantford Smoke	CoHL	2	0	2	0	100	11	0	6.60	—	—	—	—	—	—	—	—	—
NHL totals			1	0	0	0	40	3	0	4.50	.750	—	—	—	—	—	—	—	—

== See also ==
- List of players who played only one game in the NHL
