= New York Slapshots =

Defunct minor league ice hockey team

- City: Staten Island, New York
- League: Atlantic Coast Hockey League
- Founded: 1985
- Operated: 1985–86
- Colors: Gold, green, white
- Owner: Rudy Slucker
- General manager: Dave Schultz
- Head coach: Dave Schultz (1985-86); Joe Selenski (1986)

Franchise history
- 1985–86: New York Slapshots
- 1986: Troy Slapshots

The New York Slapshots were a professional ice hockey team and a member of the Atlantic Coast Hockey League in the 1985–86 season. Although the team was based on Staten Island, New York, the Slapshots' planned arena in Travis was never built and the team ended up having to play its 'home' games elsewhere, functioning as a traveling team. In May 1986, the franchise relocated to Troy, New York, and was renamed the Troy Slapshots.

== History ==
=== Background ===
On August 28, 1985, a press conference was held to formally announce the establishment of the New York Slapshots, a new team in the Atlantic Coast Hockey League (ACHL) that would begin play in the 1985–86 season at the planned Phil Esposito Sports and Entertainment Center in the Travis neighborhood of Staten Island. The team was the borough's first professional sports franchise since the Staten Island Staples played in the 1930s. The Slapshots were owned by Rudy Slucker, the president of a hardware company in Long Island City, who got the idea to purchase a professional sports franchise from his optician Lee Blowstein; Blowstein and Sportsworld Marketing were the team's minority owners.

The league had some concerns about the team's name and its relationship to the 1977 film Slap Shot, which depicted a minor league ice hockey team that resorted to violent play to gain popularity. ACHL Commissioner Ray Miron said, "This is not a 'Slapshot' league at all. There's none of that stickwork here." ACHL President Rick Dudley added, "When people see the quality and the speed of the ACHL, they'll see we're not in the same world as 'Slapshot.'" The following month, Dave Schultz, a former NHL veteran who spent the majority of his career with the Philadelphia Flyers during their Broad Street Bullies days, was announced as the team's general manager and coach. Schultz also served as the Slapshots' bus driver. The team opened an office on Staten Island, which was located at 42 Richmond Terrace in St. George, and began selling season tickets.

Site of the planned Phil Esposito Sports and Entertainment Center in Travis, Staten Island

Development of the Phil Esposito Sports and Entertainment Center in Travis had been announced earlier that year, which was backed by former New York Rangers player Phil Esposito. The proposed 5,000-seat arena was to be located at 4320 Victory Boulevard on a site near the West Shore Expressway and Courts of Appeal Racquetball and Tennis Club. A groundbreaking ceremony for the venue was held on April 26, 1985, and attended by Esposito and Deputy Borough President Nicholas LaPorte. The new facility was being developed by King Ice Enterprises and was scheduled to be opened in October.

=== 1985–86 season ===
At the beginning of October, the Slapshots didn't have an arena or players, and Schultz was working out of a sparsely furnished office with unpainted walls. The team acquired their first six players on October 17, 1985, when the ACHL held a dispersal draft to allocate the rights to the players from the Pinebridge Bucks, a team that disbanded after the 1984–85 season. As an expansion team, the Slapshots had the first overall pick in the draft, and used it to select goaltender Ray LeBlanc. Less than 30 minutes later, Schultz traded LeBlanc to the Carolina Thunderbirds for forward Dan Potter and three other players to be named later. The Slapshots also selected two more forwards with the team's other picks in the dispersal draft. On November 1, 1985, the Slapshots began their training camp at the Ocean Ice Arena in Bricktown, New Jersey. The first day of camp included open tryouts for the team, which included about 50 players, 10 of which were drafted at the ACHL rookie camp that had been held earlier that week in Erie, Pennsylvania. Schultz trimmed his roster down to 19 players by November 5th and needed get down to 16 skaters prior to the team's opening game.

On November 8, 1985, the Slapshots opened their season on the road against the Erie Golden Blades; the team was scheduled to begin the season with eight consecutive road games to allow for completion of the Phil Esposito Sports and Entertainment Center. The Slapshots lost their debut by a score of 8–4 and were thrown off their game by the intimidating play of the Golden Blades in a first period that included 88 minutes in penalties, many of which were for slashing, high sticking and fighting. Schultz said, "Most of the guys here have never played where they get punched in the face or speared and the referee doesn't call anything. If cheap shots win games in this league, we'll go to that. Right now, we have terrific athletes that are skilled hockey players."

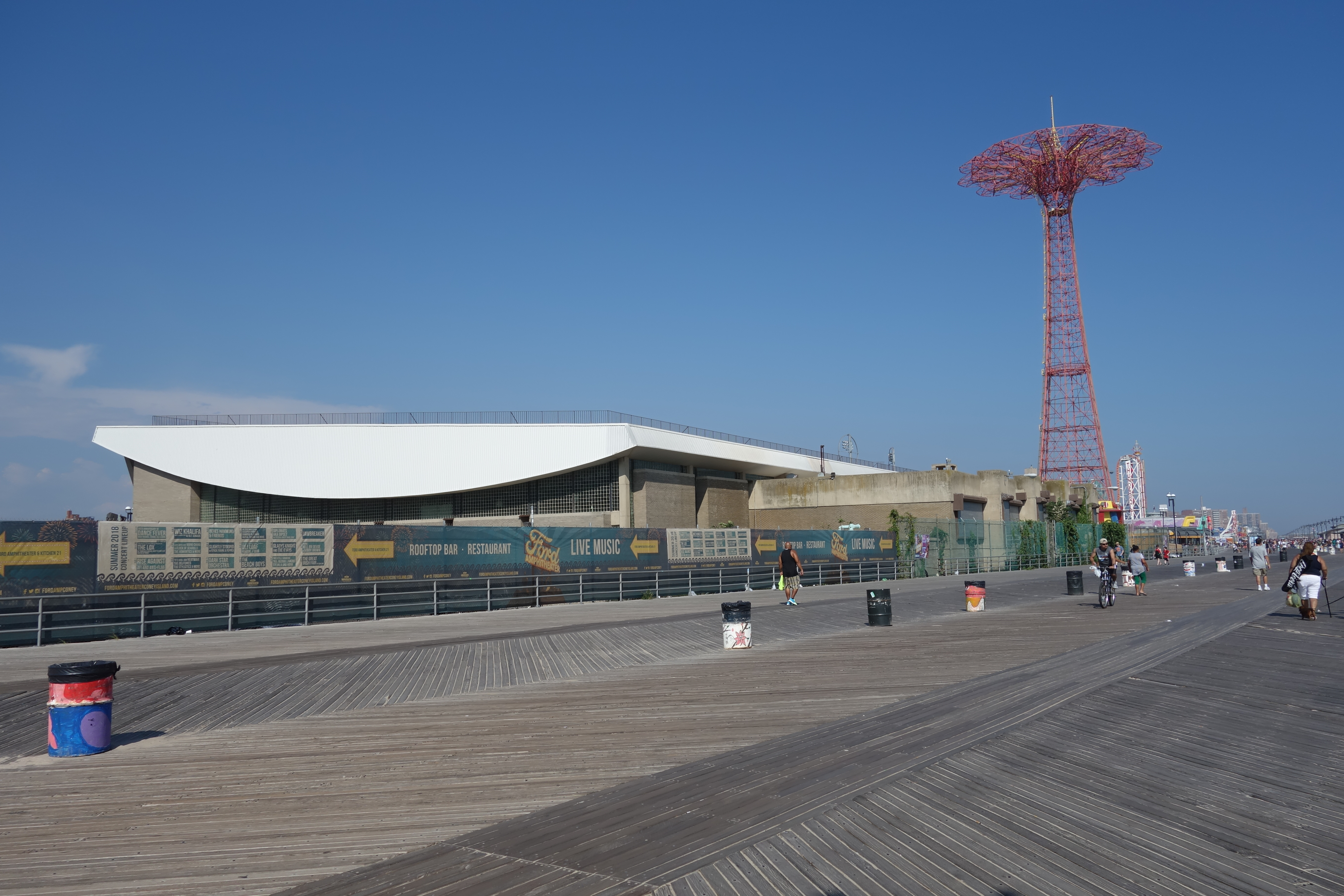
The Abe Stark Sports Center, viewed from the Coney Island Boardwalk

Site preparation work for the Slapshots' new arena did not begin until November 12, 1985. The foundation work was expected to begin the following week, after which it would take three months of construction for the rink to be ready. Before the opening game of the season, the team's ownership learned that there would be a fifty percent chance if the Slapshots would play on Staten Island during their first season and they would need to find another venue as an alternative. The team attempted to play its initial home games at the Abe Stark Arena in the Coney Island neighborhood of Brooklyn, but these plans did not pan out and the team instead looked at a city-owned facility in Newark, New Jersey as another option.

By the time the team was scheduled to open at home on December 7, 1985, construction of the Phil Esposito Sports and Entertainment Center had still yet to begin, and the Slapshots postponed their first three home games and announced their intention to play the balance of their home schedule in The Ironbound neighborhood of Newark. The city of Newark, which goaltender Ward Komonosky called "the dirtiest, dingiest, grungiest city I've ever seen," forced the Slapshots to spend about $20,000 in making improvements to the Ironbound Recreation Center before allowing them to play. The team's first 'home' game in Newark was held on December 30, 1985, when the Mohawk Valley Comets beat the Slapshots 4–3 in front of an estimated crowd of 400 fans.

The team experienced attendance problems in Newark—only drawing about 75 to 100 fans per game—and later relocated to Vinton, Virginia to cut its losses, with the intention to return to Staten Island the following season. Schultz elected not make the move to Virginia so he could remain with his family in New Jersey and relinquished his position as head coach to Joe Selenski, who had been serving as the team's assistant general manager. Schultz kept his position as general manager and ran the team from Staten Island. Slapshots forward Kevin Foster, a native of Glen Ridge, New Jersey, also stayed home after the team's move to Virginia and worked as a substitute teacher.

Ironically, the Slapshots' first 'home' game at the LancerLot in Vinton, the home rink of the Virginia Lancers, was scheduled to be played against the Lancers on February 5, 1986. That game had to be postponed because some of the Slapshots' players were stranded at an airport and the bus carrying the team's equipment broke down on its way to Virginia. When the game was played on February 11, 1986, the Slapshots defeated the Lancers in overtime by a score of 3–2. One week later, the Slapshots were missing five players due to the flu and ended up dressing head coach Selenski and assistant trainer Paul Litz as players in a 14–2 loss to the Thunderbirds. The Slapshots failed to qualify for the playoffs and their final 'home' game in Vinton against the Lancers was canceled. Lancers' team owner Henry Brabham remarked, "It was their home game, so we didn't care."

Bobby Williams of the Slapshots was named the ACHL Rookie of the Year for the 1985–86 season. The center—who was the son of Tommy Williams—scored 45 goals and added 18 assists despite appearing in only 40 games, having missed part of the season due to a wrist injury. Williams earned a weekly salary of $150, with a $35 bonus for each game the team won. When describing his time spent with the Slapshots, Williams said, "We liked to think of ourselves as a finesse team, because we really didn't have a big, tough team. But Schultz made sure we didn't back away from anything... I remember one game... Schultz took a stick and went out on the ice and banged one of the Carolina guys over the head with it." The game that Williams was referring to was likely the one played at the Winston-Salem War Memorial Coliseum on January 31, 1986, when Schultz hit Thunderbirds winger Brian Johnson on the head with a hockey stick, resulting in a bench-clearing brawl, with Schultz and three other players being ejected from the game.

The Slapshots were the final landing spot in the professional hockey career of Howie Young, who at 48 years old was the oldest player on the team's roster. The Toronto native played in the National Hockey League from 1960 to 1971 and had hung up his skates in 1979 after several stints with minor league teams. He made a brief comeback in 1985, appearing in four games with Flint Spirits before being released and was offered a job by Schultz. Young played in seven games for the Slapshots before he was cut and stuck around for another week to help drive the team bus for road trips before he left to return home for Christmas.

=== Relocation to Troy ===
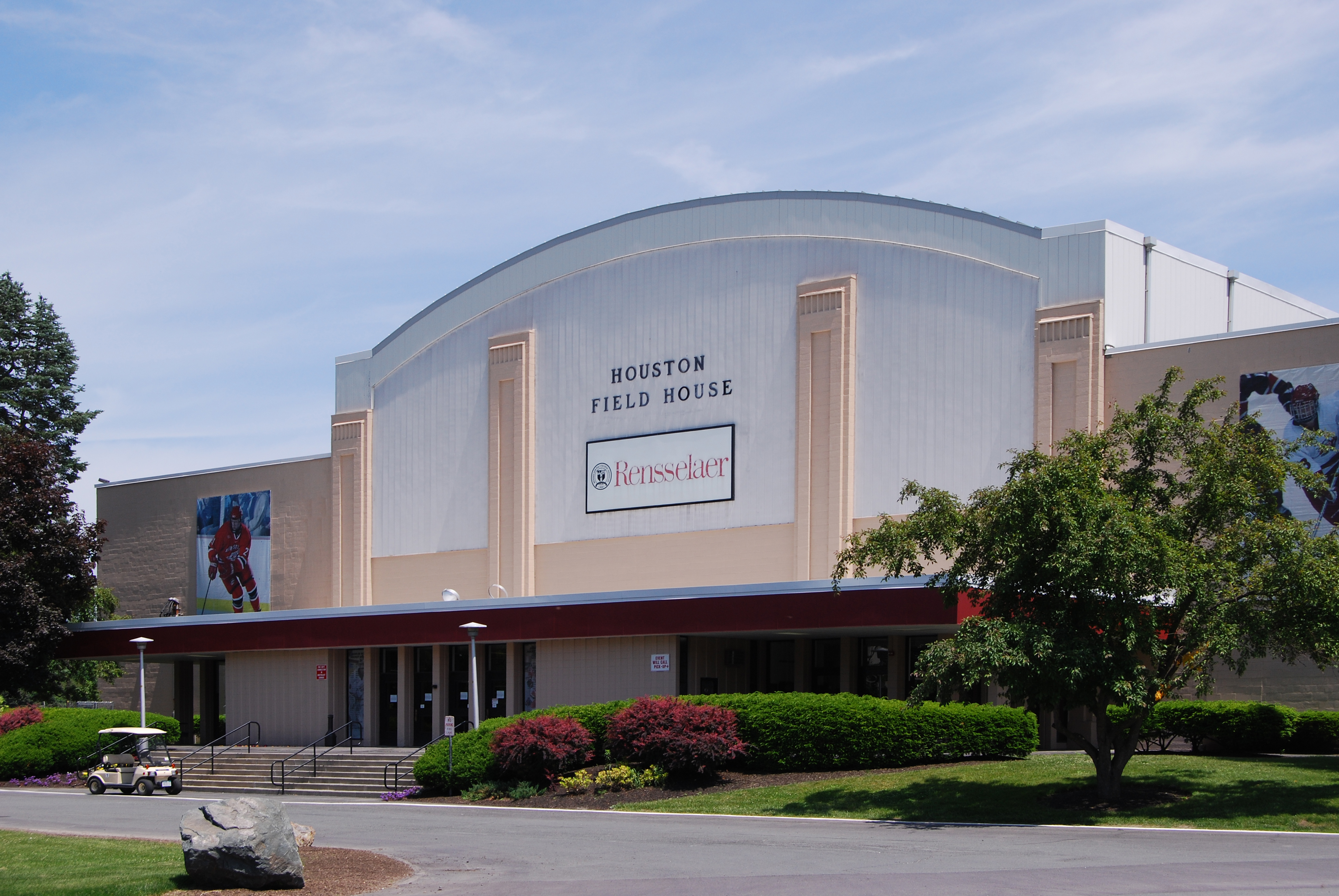
The Houston Field House in Troy

Slucker originally planned to move the Slapshots to the Mennen Sports Arena in Morristown, New Jersey for the 1986–87 season and had even made a deposit to host playoff games at the arena in April 1986, if his team qualified for the playoffs the prior season. However, in May 1986, the team and league announced that the Slapshots would instead be moving upstate to Troy and playing their games at the Houston Field House, a 5,367-seat arena located on the campus of Rensselaer Polytechnic Institute.

The Troy Slapshots ended up folding in November 1986, only six games into the season. "We should have known a team with that name would never make it," said ACHL Commissioner Miron after the team's removal from the league. He added, "If the history of the Slapshots is ever written, it would make a good sequel to the movie of the same name."

The Slapshots left Staten Island businesses with unpaid bills and ignored requests for refunds from fans that had purchased tickets. The Troy Slapshots claimed that they weren't responsible for the financial obligations of the New York Slapshots, which filed a lawsuit against King Ice Enterprises for "breaching an oral agreement by failing to provide facilities for home games for the 1985–86 season" because the original team had "suspended operations" and the new team was established as "a new entity". The arena that the Slapshots were supposed to play in on Staten Island was never built. The 5.4-acre (2.2 ha) tract of land in Travis remained vacant and was scheduled to be auctioned off in December 1992 as a mortgage foreclosure.

== Season-by-season results ==
Season	Games	Won	Lost	Tied	Points	GF	GA	Playoffs
1985–86	59	21	38	0	42	260	367	Did not qualify
