= Howie Young =

Canadian ice hockey player, actor (1937–1999)

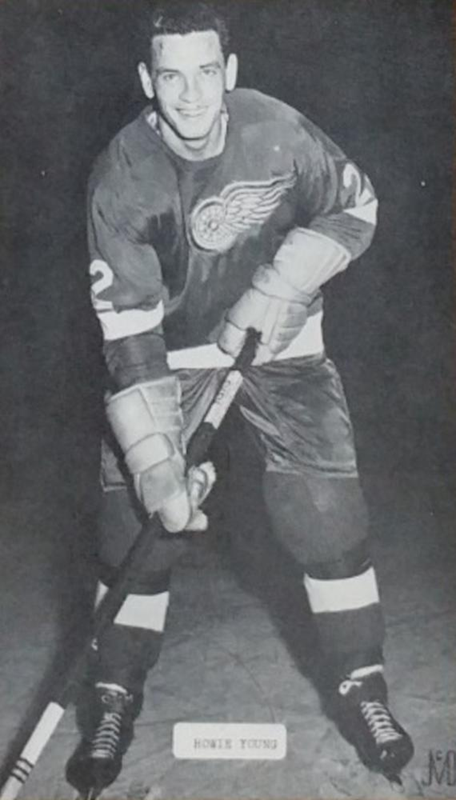
- Young in 1960s postcard
- Born: August 2, 1937 Scarborough, [Ontario, Canada
- Died: November 24, 1999 (aged 62) Albuquerque, New Mexico, U.S.
- Height: 5 ft 11 in (180 cm)
- Weight: 175 lb (79 kg; 12 st 7 lb)
- Position: Defence/Right wing
- Shot: Right
- Played for: Detroit Red Wings; Chicago Black Hawks; Vancouver Canucks; Phoenix Roadrunners; Winnipeg Jets
- Playing career: 1954–1979

Howard John Edward "Cowboy" Young (August 2, 1937 – November 24, 1999) was a Canadian professional ice hockey player and actor, best known for his time in the National Hockey League with the Detroit Red Wings in the 1960s.

== Playing career ==
=== Early years in Detroit ===
Young joined the Red Wings in the 1960–61 season. In his rookie season, Young recorded 8 assists and led the Wings with 108 penalty minutes in 29 games. In the playoffs, he appeared in all eleven games and scored two goals to help the Red Wings reach the Stanley Cup Finals.

He split another season between the NHL and the minors before establishing himself as a regular in 1962–63. That year he recorded nine points in 62 games and set the league record for penalty minutes, recording 273 to break Lou Fontinato's record of 202. His pugilistic exploits earned him a place on the cover of Sports Illustrated in January 1963.

However, his drinking had by this point reached full-blown alcoholism, and despite his popularity in Detroit the team shipped him to the Chicago Black Hawks in the summer of 1963.

=== Los Angeles ===
Young's problems followed him to Chicago, and the Black Hawks' patience ran out even quicker than Detroit's did. Midway through the 1963–64 season, the team sold him to the Los Angeles Blades of the Western Hockey League. There he was one of the league's most feared defenders; he led the league in penalty minutes in both his full seasons there while contributing offensively from the blueline. Young played a minor role in the film None But The Brave.

In 1965, Young entered Alcoholics Anonymous.

=== Return to the NHL ===
Young started the 1966–67 season dominating the WHL, with 22 points in his first 29 games. More impressively, the once-volatile defender spent just 43 minutes in the penalty box. Impressed with his sobriety and improved play, the Red Wings traded three players to Los Angeles to reacquire him.

Back in the NHL for the first time in three years, Young played the best hockey of his career. In 44 games for the Red Wings, he recorded 3 goals and 14 assists for 17 points along with 100 penalty minutes. In 1967–68, he would spend another full season in Detroit, setting career highs with 17 assists and 19 points.

He was then dealt to Oakland before being re-acquired by Chicago for the 1968–69 season, where he began to show his age. Now 32, he slumped to just 10 points in 57 games and seemed to have lost his physical edge. He spent most of the following two seasons in the minors, with an 11-game stint with the Vancouver Canucks in 1970–71, before retiring.

=== Comeback, WHA years and retirement ===
After a year away from the sport, Young signed on with the WHL Phoenix Roadrunners. Despite being 35 and having played defense for most of his career, he returned as a forward, and was surprisingly successful. In 1972–73, he scored 20 goals and 38 assists for 58 points for the Roadrunners. In 1973–74, he was better yet, scoring 37 goals (sixth in the league) and 68 points, and was named a WHL First-Team All-Star.

In the 1974–75 season, the Roadrunners became a member of the World Hockey Association, and Young stayed with the team through the move. Now 37 and playing top-level pro hockey for the first time in five years, he recorded 15 points in 30 games before being sold mid-season to the Winnipeg Jets. In Winnipeg he was reunited with his former Chicago teammate Bobby Hull, and delivered 13 goals in 42 games. He finished the year with 16 goals and 22 assists for 38 points in 72 games.

Young retired again in 1975, but returned to Phoenix late in the 1976–77 season. Nearly 40, he scored just one goal and four points in 26 games. He played low-level minor pro hockey for another two seasons in Phoenix and Los Angeles before retiring again in 1979. He made yet another comeback in the 1985–86 season with the Flint Spirits of the IHL, picking up an assist in 4 games, an impressive feat at the age of nearly 50 in a league just a notch below the NHL. After being cut by the Spirits, Young was offered a roster spot on the New York Slapshots of the ACHL by head coach-general manager Dave Schultz. Young appeared in 7 games for the Slapshots before he was released in December.

== Later life ==
After retirement, Young moved to New Mexico where he owned a ranch and drove a school bus. He also worked as an actor; in 1989, he played an outlaw on the television mini-series Lonesome Dove, in 1990 he portrayed Poe Possey in the movie Young Guns II, and in 1997 he appeared with Tom Selleck in the 1997 television film Last Stand at Saber River.

Young died November 24, 1999, at age 62, from pancreatic cancer.

== Career statistics ==
=== Regular season and playoffs ===
			Regular season					Playoffs
Season	Team	League	GP	G	A	Pts	PIM	GP	G	A	Pts	PIM
1953–54	St. Michael's Midget Majors	THL	—	—	—	—	—	—	—	—	—	—
1953–54	Scarborough Scouts	OHA-B	—	—	—	—	—	—	—	—	—	—
1954–55	Kitchener Canucks	OHA	49	6	7	13	155	—	—	—	—	—
1955–56	Kitchener Canucks	OHA	28	2	5	7	40	—	—	—	—	—
1956–57	Hamilton Tiger Cubs	OHA	52	5	15	20	228	4	0	1	1	28
1957–58	Hamilton Tiger Cubs	OHA	40	3	7	10	163	—	—	—	—	—
1958–59	New Westminster Royals	WHL	4	0	1	1	26	—	—	—	—	—
1958–59	Chicoutimi Sagueneens	QHL	50	4	16	20	180	—	—	—	—	—
1959–60	Rochester Americans	AHL	68	7	7	14	170	—	—	—	—	—
1960–61	Hershey Bears	AHL	33	1	5	6	160	—	—	—	—	—
1960–61	Detroit Red Wings	NHL	29	0	8	8	108	11	2	2	4	30
1961–62	Detroit Red Wings	NHL	30	0	2	2	67	—	—	—	—	—
1961–62	Edmonton Flyers	WHL	24	3	15	18	97	12	3	10	13	49
1962–63	Detroit Red Wings	NHL	64	4	5	9	273	8	0	2	2	16
1963–64	Chicago Black Hawks	NHL	39	0	7	7	99	—	—	—	—	—
1963–64	Los Angeles Blades	WHL	13	2	4	6	40	4	0	2	2	21
1964–65	Los Angeles Blades	WHL	65	10	20	30	227	—	—	—	—	—
1965–66	Los Angeles Blades	WHL	44	5	11	16	170	—	—	—	—	—
1966–67	Los Angeles Blades	WHL	29	5	17	22	43	—	—	—	—	—
1966–67	Detroit Red Wings	NHL	44	3	14	17	100	—	—	—	—	—
1967–68	Detroit Red Wings	NHL	62	2	17	19	112	—	—	—	—	—
1967–68	Fort Worth Wings	CPHL	5	1	2	3	12	—	—	—	—	—
1968–69	Chicago Black Hawks	NHL	57	3	7	10	67	—	—	—	—	—
1969–70	Rochester Americans	AHL	56	17	20	37	75	—	—	—	—	—
1969–70	Vancouver Canucks	WHL	16	0	3	3	44	—	—	—	—	—
1970–71	Vancouver Canucks	NHL	11	0	2	2	25	—	—	—	—	—
1970–71	Phoenix Roadrunners	WHL	57	11	32	43	136	10	0	3	3	21
1972–73	Phoenix Roadrunners	WHL	71	20	38	58	223	10	1	5	6	31
1973–74	Phoenix Roadrunners	WHL	71	37	32	69	124	9	3	3	6	6
1974–75	Phoenix Roadrunners	WHA	30	3	12	15	44	—	—	—	—	—
1974–75	Winnipeg Jets	WHA	42	13	10	23	42	—	—	—	—	—
1976–77	Phoenix Roadrunners	WHA	26	1	3	4	23	—	—	—	—	—
1976–77	Oklahoma City Blazers	CHL	4	0	0	0	8	—	—	—	—	—
1977–78	Phoenix Roadrunners	PHL	39	4	11	15	63	—	—	—	—	—
1978–79	Los Angeles Blades	PHL	14	0	2	2	22	—	—	—	—	—
1985–86	Flint Spirits	IHL	4	0	1	1	2	—	—	—	—	—
1985–86	New York Slapshots	ACHL	7	0	1	1	18	—	—	—	—	—
NHL totals			336	12	62	74	851	19	2	4	6	46
WHA totals			98	17	25	42	109	—	—	—	—	—
WHL totals			394	93	173	266	1130	45	7	23	30	128
AHL totals			157	25	32	57	405	—	—	—	—	—
