= Paul O'Neil =

American ice hockey player (born 1953)

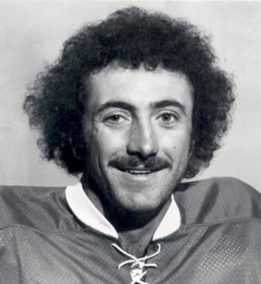
- O'Neil in 1978 photo
- Born: August 24, 1953 (age 72) Charlestown, Massachusetts, U.S.
- Height: 6 ft 1 in (185 cm)
- Weight: 185 lb (84 kg; 13 st 3 lb)
- Position: Center/Right Wing
- Shot: Right
- Played for: NHL; Vancouver Canucks; Boston Bruins; WHA; Birmingham Bulls
- National team: United States
- NHL draft: 67th overall, 1973; Vancouver Canucks
- WHA draft: 61st overall, 1973; Houston Aeros
- Playing career: 1973–1986

Paul Joseph O'Neil (born August 24, 1953) is an American former professional ice hockey center. He was drafted by the Vancouver Canucks in the fifth round, 67th overall, of the 1973 NHL Amateur Draft. He was also drafted by the Houston Aeros in the fifth round, 61st overall, of the 1973 WHA Amateur Draft. O'Neil played six National Hockey League games in his career (five with Vancouver and one with the Boston Bruins) and one World Hockey Association game (with the Birmingham Bulls), spending the bulk of his career in the minor leagues. Internationally he played for the United States at the 1973 World Championship Group B.

== Career statistics ==
=== Regular season and playoffs ===
| | | | Regular season | | | | | Playoffs |
| Season | Team | League | GP | G | A | Pts | PIM | GP | G | A | Pts | PIM |
|---|---|---|---|---|---|---|---|---|---|---|---|---|
| 1971–72 | Boston University | ECAC | 17 | 13 | 14 | 27 | 6 | — | — | — | — | — |
| 1972–73 | Boston University | ECAC | 28 | 35 | 19 | 54 | 8 | — | — | — | — | — |
| 1973–74 | Vancouver Canucks | NHL | 5 | 0 | 0 | 0 | 0 | — | — | — | — | — |
| 1973–74 | Seattle Totems | WHL | 66 | 29 | 17 | 46 | 14 | — | — | — | — | — |
| 1974–75 | Seattle Totems | CHL | 49 | 16 | 19 | 35 | 7 | — | — | — | — | — |
| 1975–76 | Boston Bruins | NHL | 1 | 0 | 0 | 0 | 0 | — | — | — | — | — |
| 1975–76 | Rochester Americans | AHL | 49 | 35 | 16 | 51 | 17 | 6 | 4 | 3 | 7 | 4 |
| 1976–77 | Hampton Gulls | SHL | 48 | 21 | 34 | 55 | 0 | — | — | — | — | — |
| 1977–78 | Hampton Gulls | AHL | 36 | 17 | 27 | 44 | 9 | — | — | — | — | — |
| 1977–78 | San Diego Mariners | PHL | 17 | 11 | 9 | 20 | 0 | — | — | — | — | — |
| 1978–79 | Birmingham Bulls | WHA | 1 | 0 | 0 | 0 | 0 | — | — | — | — | — |
| 1978–79 | Binghamton Dusters | AHL | 5 | 0 | 3 | 3 | 0 | — | — | — | — | — |
| 1978–79 | San Diego Hawks | PHL | 39 | 30 | 14 | 44 | 14 | — | — | — | — | — |
| 1979–80 | HC Salzburg | AUT | 34 | 55 | 43 | 98 | 28 | — | — | — | — | — |
| 1980–81 | HC Salzburg | AUT | 9 | 7 | 3 | 10 | 0 | — | — | — | — | — |
| 1980–81 | Hampton Aces | EHL | 33 | 21 | 16 | 37 | 9 | — | — | — | — | — |
| 1981–82 | HC Salzburg | AUT | — | — | — | — | — | — | — | — | — | — |
| 1982–83 | Virginia Raiders | ACHL | 55 | 38 | 41 | 79 | 20 | 1 | 0 | 1 | 1 | 0 |
| 1983–84 | Birmingham Bulls | ACHL | 70 | 51 | 72 | 123 | 8 | 4 | 1 | 0 | 1 | 0 |
| 1984–85 | Virginia Lancers | ACHL | 47 | 28 | 41 | 69 | 20 | — | — | — | — | — |
| 1985–86 | Virginia Lancers | ACHL | 57 | 34 | 38 | 72 | 18 | 5 | 2 | 2 | 4 | 2 |
| WHA totals | | | 1 | 0 | 0 | 0 | 0 | — | — | — | — | — |
| NHL totals | | | 6 | 0 | 0 | 0 | 0 | — | — | — | — | — |

=== International ===
| Year | Team | Event | GP | G | A | Pts | PIM |
|---|---|---|---|---|---|---|---|
| 1973 | United States | WC-B | 7 | 0 | 3 | 3 | 0 |
| Senior totals | | | 7 | 0 | 3 | 3 | 0 |
