= Joe Selenski =

- Born: 1955 or 1956 (age 70–71)
- Coached for: ACHL; New York Slapshots; Troy Slapshots; Mohawk Valley Comets; PNHL; Bellingham Bulls; AAHL; Johnstown Chiefs; ECHL; Carolina Thunderbirds
- Coaching career: 1986–1989

Joe Selenski (born c. 1955) is a former minor league hockey coach and general manager. Following his coaching career, he became a minister in the North Country of Upstate New York.

== Early life ==
The son of Joseph P. and Glenda Selenski, Joe Selenski grew up in Marlton, New Jersey and attended Lenape High School in Medford. He later went to Trenton State College, where he majored in psychology. Selenski played amateur hockey with the South Jersey Hockey Association through the 1970s. He also served as a coach of the midget and junior programs in the Gladiator Youth Hockey Club in Voorhees Township; one of his team's players was the son of Philadelphia Flyers' captain Bobby Clarke. Selenski later spent three years serving as the director of coaching with the Gladiator Youth Hockey Club, where he crossed paths with Dave Schultz, a former player for the Philadelphia Flyers, when Schultz took over as the coach of his son's team in January 1985.

== Coaching career ==
=== Atlantic Coast Hockey League (1985–1987) ===
Selenski got his start as a head coach midway through the inaugural season (1985–86) of the New York Slapshots of the Atlantic Coast Hockey League (ACHL). He was serving as the team's assistant general manager and took over the coaching duties from head coach and general manager Dave Schultz after the team's unexpected move to Virginia so Schultz could remain with his family in South Jersey. The team had been facing financial difficulties prior to the move and was operating on a $25,000 security bond posted by its owner. On January 24, 1986, Selenski had to step in and take the place behind the bench for Schultz during the second period of a 5–3 loss to the Carolina Thunderbirds after the Slapshots' coach was ejected from the game. On February 18, 1986, coach Selenski and assistant trainer Paul Litz ended up having to play in a game against the Thunderbirds in Virginia when five of the Slapshots' players were out with the flu; Selenski was assessed a minor penalty for cross-checking in the second period of the game, which the Slapshots lost by a score of 14–2.

Selenski then served as the coach and general manager with the Troy Slapshots following the team's relocation to Troy, New York. However, the Slapshots would see limited action in the 1986–87 ACHL season, playing only six games. Shortly after the ACHL voted to drop the Slapshots and not have a dispersal draft, instead giving the Mohawk Valley Comets the rights to all the players on the Slapshots roster for a period of ten days, the Comets would fire their coach (Bill Horton) and replace him with Selenski, who assumed the dual role of coach and general manager. The Comets would go 22-22-3 under Selenski and make the playoffs. However, the Comets would eventually lose to the Virginia Lancers four games to three in the Payne Trophy Finals. After the completion of the 1986–87 ACHL season, the Comets transferred to the AHL and were later rebranded as the Utica Devils, to be coached by Tom McVie, and the ACHL was folded by Commissioner Ray Miron.

=== Pacific Northwest Hockey League (1987) ===
In July 1987, Selenski was hired as the coach and general manager of the Bellingham Bulls, a franchise based in Bellingham, Washington that was to play in the Pacific Northwest Hockey League. However, the league suspended operations the week before the season was supposed to start and the Bulls left behind at least $40,000 in unpaid bills, including about $30,000 in making improvements to the Bellingham Arena—the former Bakerview Ice Arena that was located near the Bellingham airport. Selenski estimated that he incurred between $5,000 and $6,000 of debt since he had moved to the area over the summer, much of which was associated with helping the players he had recruited that were stuck in Whatcom County after the league shut down. At the time, he was living in a one-bedroom apartment at the arena and said, "I have $7, my dog, and a '77 Chevy Nova. I have no job, no place to live."

=== All-American Hockey League (1987–1988) ===
Without a team to coach at the start of the 1987–88 season, Selenski headed to Johnstown, Pennsylvania to negotiate the foundation of a hockey team in the newly formed All-American Hockey League. On December 27, 1987, Selenski - along with future team owner Henry Brabham - walked into Dennis Grenell's office at the Cambria County War Memorial Arena and inquired about potentially putting a new franchise in the city. Selenski expected to be able to field team by the start of the following season, but Grenell said he wanted a team "right now". Within two weeks, Selenski was able to find uniforms from a Canadian vendor and field a team based on old players who he had coached while in the ACHL and players from his Bellingham Bulls team.

Playing their home games in the same arena where the movie Slap Shot was filmed, the Johnstown Chiefs were named after the hockey team featured in the film and often played the same style of hockey. The Chiefs went 13-13-0 in the regular season, but were eliminated in a three-team round-robin tournament that determined the two teams that would advance to a best-of-seven playoff for the league championship. Selenski was named the league's coach of the year, but was not re-signed after the post-season. He was replaced by Steve Carlson, who had been an assistant coach with the Baltimore Skipjacks for the previous two seasons and also appeared in the movie Slap Shot as one of the three Hanson Brothers.

=== East Coast Hockey League (1988–1989) ===
During the 1988–89 season, Selenski was brought in as a midseason replacement after the Carolina Thunderbirds fired head coach Brian Carroll on Christmas Eve. Selenski took over coaching duties at the end of December and submitted his resignation on February 17, 1989, indicating that burnout was his reason for leaving and that he would not coach again.

Selenski was credited with launching the professional hockey career of Nick Vitucci and called him the night he was hired inviting him to join the Thunderbirds because he had been impressed by the goaltender's play at the Johnstown Chiefs training camp. Ten seasons later, Vitucci's favorite story remained his first road trip for Carolina with Selenski. Before the team played at Virginia on January 4, 1989, Brabham (who also owned the Lancers) joked that he would be holding a funeral for Selenski and his last-place team as payback for a comment Selenski had made during the playoffs the prior season when he told the Lancers, "Tell 'em to bring the pine boxes. They are going to need them before my team gets through with them." Selenski agreed to the challenge with Brabham, and after his team was defeated 8–4 by Lancers he was rolled off the ice on a coffin. Later that night Vitucci recalled the team bus hit a deer and said, "I thought, 'Oh my God, what have I gotten myself into.' My first game and I watch my coach rolled out of the rink in a coffin, and then I experience my first dead deer."

While in Carolina, Selenski also coached several players who would reach the National Hockey League (NHL) in various capacities. Forward Bill Huard would later go on to play over 200 games in the NHL with five different teams. Scott Allen would later coach in the East Coast Hockey League and American Hockey League for 13 years before assuming the position of Assistant Coach for the New York Islanders at the start of the 2010-11 NHL season. Goaltender Toby O'Brien would later become a scout supervisor for the New York Islanders' affiliates in Bridgeport and Utah. Allen and O'Brien would also go on to coach the Johnstown Chiefs, a team that Selenski coached during the team's inaugural 1987–88 season.

== Post-hockey career ==
Selenski was ordained as an American Baptist Churches pastor in 1996. He served as pastor of the First Baptist Church in Malone, New York before becoming pastor of Lifeway Community Church in nearby North Bangor. He also founded the Barnabas House Homeless Shelter in Malone and served as its director for ten years.

Prior to becoming a pastor, Selenski served as the coordinator of the gleaning program for the Community Action Agency of Franklin County. Selenski and other employees of the agency were recognized by the Secretary of State of New York for delivering emergency food supplies to victims of the Microburst of 1995, particularly those in the community of Star Lake in St. Lawrence County.

Preceded by Franchise created	Head coaches of the Johnstown Chiefs; 1987-88	Succeeded by Steve Carlson
