= Alan May =

Canadian ice hockey player (born 1965)

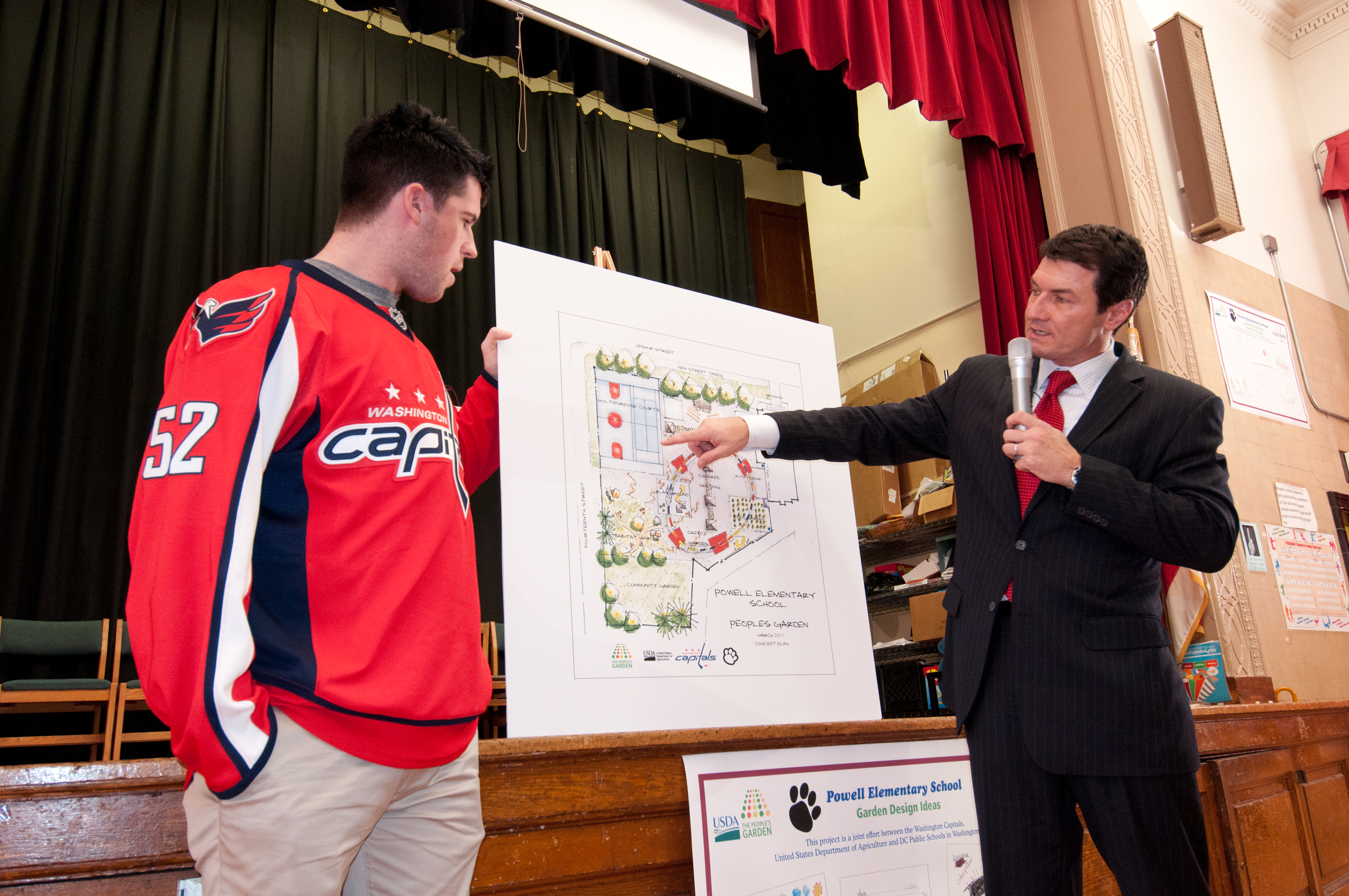
- Born: January 14, 1965 (age 61) Barrhead, Alberta, Canada
- Height: 6 ft 1 in (185 cm)
- Weight: 200 lb (91 kg; 14 st 4 lb)
- Position: Right wing
- Shot: Right
- Played for: Boston Bruins; Edmonton Oilers; Washington Capitals; Dallas Stars; Calgary Flames
- NHL draft: Undrafted
- Playing career: 1986–1999

Alan Randy May (born January 14, 1965) is a Canadian-American former NHL player, most known for his time playing for Washington Capitals from 1989 to 1994. Since 2009, he has been a studio host and analyst at Monumental Sports Network, formerly known as NBC Sports Washington and also performs rinkside analyst duties for all home games.

== Career ==
While growing up in Alberta, May played juniors with the Medicine Hat Tigers and the New Westminster Bruins. After scoring 23 goals for the Carolina Thunderbirds of the Atlantic Coast League in 1986-87, the young forward was signed by the Boston Bruins as a free agent, although he would spend most of his time in the minors. May was the first member of the Carolina Thunderbirds to reach the NHL without prior professional experience. He later moved on to the Edmonton Oilers; again, he spent most of his time in the minors.

In 1989, May became more known after his trade to the Washington Capitals. During his almost five seasons with the Capitals, his gritty, hard-nosed style of play made him a fan favorite, and helped the team reach the semifinals for the first time, in 1990. May remains the Capitals' single season leader in penalty minutes with 339, which he set during the 1989-90 season. May also played for the Dallas Stars and Calgary Flames before finishing his NHL career. In 393 NHL games, he scored 31 goals and 45 assists, and amassed 1,348 penalty minutes. May was traded at the NHL trade deadline four times in his career. This record was equaled by Thomas Vanek in 2018.

In 1999, he coached the short-lived Dallas Stallions roller-hockey team. He went on to briefly coach the Lubbock Cotton Kings.

== Personal life ==
May was married to Sherayne Ayres. Their first son, Devin, was born 27 August 1992. Their daughter, Kaylee, was born 16 December 1999. Their youngest child, Brendan, was born 18 June 2004.

May and Ayres divorced in 2017. His family resides in Denton County, Texas. He currently resides in Washington, D.C.

On 27 March 2020, May's oldest son Devin died in North Dallas. Devin left behind two sons and a daughter.

== Career statistics ==
=== Regular season and playoffs ===
			Regular season					Playoffs
Season	Team	League	GP	G	A	Pts	PIM	GP	G	A	Pts	PIM
1982–83	Estevan Bruins	SJHL	—	—	—	—	—	—	—	—	—	—
1982–83	Brandon Wheat Kings	WHL	1	0	0	0	2	—	—	—	—	—
1983–84	Estevan Bruins	SJHL	63	29	29	58	—	—	—	—	—	—
1984–85	Estevan Bruins	SJHL	64	51	47	98	409	—	—	—	—	—
1985–86	Medicine Hat Tigers	WHL	6	1	0	1	25	—	—	—	—	—
1985–86	New Westminster Bruins	WHL	32	8	9	17	81	—	—	—	—	—
1986–87	Springfield Indians	AHL	4	0	2	2	11	—	—	—	—	—
1986–87	Carolina Thunderbirds	ACHL	42	23	14	37	310	5	2	2	4	57
1987–88	Boston Bruins	NHL	3	0	0	0	15	—	—	—	—	—
1987–88	Maine Mariners	AHL	61	14	11	25	257	—	—	—	—	—
1987–88	Nova Scotia Oilers	AHL	13	4	1	5	54	4	0	0	0	51
1988–89	Edmonton Oilers	NHL	3	1	0	1	7	—	—	—	—	—
1988–89	Cape Breton Oilers	AHL	50	12	13	25	214	—	—	—	—	—
1988–89	New Haven Nighthawks	AHL	12	2	8	10	99	16	6	3	9	105
1989–90	Washington Capitals	NHL	77	7	10	17	339	15	0	0	0	37
1990–91	Washington Capitals	NHL	67	4	6	10	264	11	1	1	2	37
1991–92	Washington Capitals	NHL	75	6	9	15	221	7	0	0	0	0
1992–93	Washington Capitals	NHL	83	6	10	16	268	6	0	1	1	6
1993–94	Washington Capitals	NHL	43	4	7	11	97	—	—	—	—	—
1993–94	Dallas Stars	NHL	8	1	0	1	18	1	0	0	0	0
1994–95	Dallas Stars	NHL	27	1	1	2	106	—	—	—	—	—
1994–95	Calgary Flames	NHL	7	1	2	3	13	—	—	—	—	—
1995–96	Orlando Solar Bears	IHL	4	0	0	0	11	—	—	—	—	—
1995–96	Detroit Vipers	IHL	17	2	5	7	49	—	—	—	—	—
1995–96	Denver Grizzlies	IHL	53	13	12	25	108	14	1	2	3	14
1996–97	Houston Aeros	IHL	82	7	11	18	270	13	1	2	3	28
1998–99	Abilene Aviators	WPHL	22	6	10	16	48	3	1	0	1	9
NHL totals			393	31	45	76	1348	40	1	2	3	80
