= Jay Miller (ice hockey) =

American ice hockey player (born 1960)

- Born: July 16, 1960 (age 66) Wellesley, Massachusetts, U.S.
- Height: 6 ft 2 in (188 cm)
- Weight: 210 lb (95 kg; 15 st 0 lb)
- Position: Left wing
- Shot: Left
- Played for: Boston Bruins; Los Angeles Kings
- NHL draft: 66th overall, 1980; Quebec Nordiques
- Playing career: 1982–1992

Jay Miller (born July 16, 1960) is an American former ice hockey player. He played for the Boston Bruins and Los Angeles Kings of the National Hockey League (NHL) between 1985 and 1992.

== Early life ==
Raised in Natick, Massachusetts, Miller played college hockey with the New Hampshire Wildcats.

== Career ==
Miller was selected by the Quebec Nordiques in the fourth round, 66th overall in the 1980 NHL entry draft. Miller never got a chance to show his skills with the Nordiques; however, he spent a few seasons with a handful of minor league teams. In 1985, the 6'2 left winger signed as a free agent with the Boston Bruins and made the team that year as their enforcer. In the 1985–86 season, he played in 46 games and collected 178 penalty minutes. During his stint with the Boston Bruins, Miller was known for his many fights with John Kordic.

His role continued to expand with the Boston Bruins, playing in 78 games during the 1987–88 regular season and racking up 304 penalty minutes - both career highs. That year in the playoffs, Miller was a regular on the Bruins' squad, playing in 12 games and picking up 124 minutes in penalties. In January 1989, he was traded from the Boston Bruins to the Los Angeles Kings for future considerations. Miller played four more seasons with the Kings, in the role of enforcer on a team that included Wayne Gretzky. He retired from professional hockey in 1992, having played 446 career NHL regular-season games with 1723 penalty minutes.

== Personal life ==
Miller has three children. His daughter Brooke was born in 1989 and played college hockey on defense for the Holy Cross Crusaders. His son, also named Jay, was born in 1991 and went on to play football at Worcester Polytechnic Institute, while his youngest daughter, Taylor, played basketball as a forward for Saint Michael's College in Burlington, Vermont.

Miller and his wife Paula Miller (née Perini) have operated The Courtyard Restaurant & Pub in Bourne, Massachusetts since 1992.

Paula's great uncle Lou Perini, owned the Boston Braves from 1945 until 1962, gaining wealth from his family's construction business, Perini Corporation (now called Tutor Perini), which at one point in time was the third largest general contractor in the world.

== Career statistics ==
=== Regular season and playoffs ===
			Regular season					Playoffs
Season	Team	League	GP	G	A	Pts	PIM	GP	G	A	Pts	PIM
1978–79	Northwood School	HS-NY	—	—	—	—	—	—	—	—	—	—
1979–80	University of New Hampshire	ECAC	28	7	12	19	53	—	—	—	—	—
1980–81	University of New Hampshire	ECAC	10	4	8	12	14	—	—	—	—	—
1981–82	University of New Hampshire	ECAC	24	6	4	10	34	—	—	—	—	—
1982–83	University of New Hampshire	ECAC	28	6	4	10	28	—	—	—	—	—
1982–83	Fredericton Express	AHL	3	1	2	3	0	—	—	—	—	—
1983–84	Mohawk Valley Stars	ACHL	48	15	36	51	167	5	0	1	1	2
1983–84	Toledo Goaldiggers	IHL	2	0	0	0	2	—	—	—	—	—
1983–84	Maine Mariners	AHL	15	1	1	2	27	—	—	—	—	—
1984–85	Muskegon Lumberjacks	IHL	56	5	29	34	177	17	1	1	2	56
1985–86	Moncton Golden Flames	AHL	18	4	6	10	113	—	—	—	—	—
1985–86	Boston Bruins	NHL	46	3	0	3	178	2	0	0	0	17
1986–87	Boston Bruins	NHL	55	1	4	5	208	—	—	—	—	—
1987–88	Boston Bruins	NHL	78	7	12	19	304	12	0	0	0	124
1988–89	Boston Bruins	NHL	37	2	4	6	168	—	—	—	—	—
1988–89	Los Angeles Kings	NHL	29	5	3	8	133	11	0	1	1	63
1989–90	Los Angeles Kings	NHL	68	10	2	12	224	10	1	1	2	10
1990–91	Los Angeles Kings	NHL	66	8	12	20	259	8	0	0	0	17
1991–92	Los Angeles Kings	NHL	67	4	7	11	249	5	1	1	2	12
NHL totals			446	40	44	84	1723	48	2	3	5	243
