= Ray LeBlanc =

American ice hockey player (born 1964)

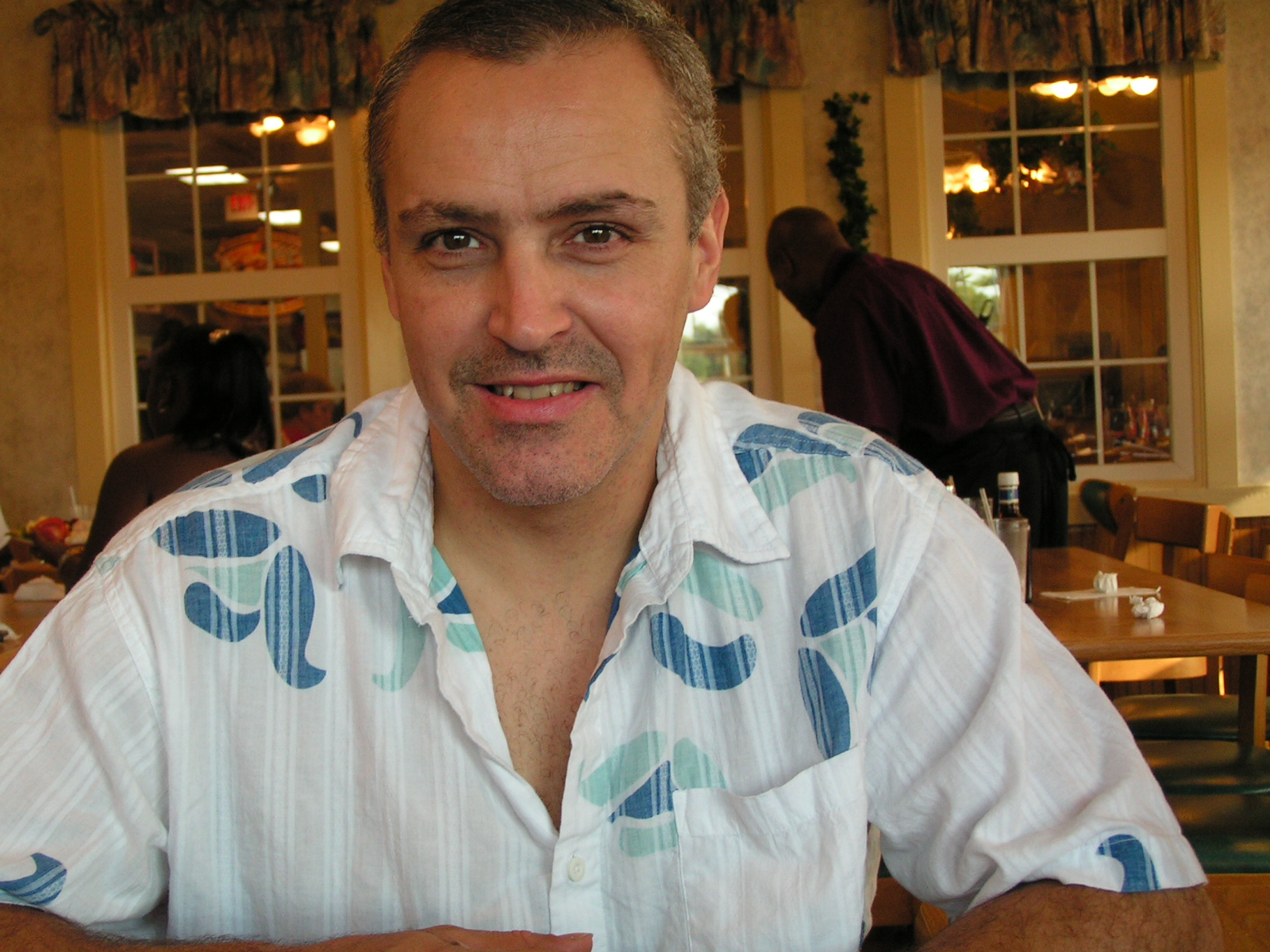
- Born: October 24, 1964 (age 61) Fitchburg, Massachusetts, U.S.
- Height: 5 ft 10 in (178 cm)
- Weight: 170 lb (77 kg; 12 st 2 lb)
- Position: Goaltender
- Caught: Right
- Played for: Chicago Blackhawks
- National team: United States
- NHL draft: Undrafted
- Playing career: 1986–2000

Raymond Jude LeBlanc (born October 24, 1964) is an American former professional ice hockey goaltender. He played one game in the National Hockey League, with the Chicago Blackhawks during the 1991–92 season. The rest of his career, which lasted from 1984 to 2000, was spent in the minor leagues. Internationally LeBlanc played for the American national team at the 1992 Winter Olympics, and at the 1992 World Championships.

== Biography ==
LeBlanc was born in Fitchburg, Massachusetts. After playing two seasons of junior hockey in Ontario, LeBlanc turned professional and joined the Pineridge Bucks of the Atlantic Coast Hockey League (ACHL) for the 1984–85 season. After the team disbanded, LeBlanc was selected first overall by the New York Slapshots in the ACHL's dispersal draft, but was traded less than 30 minutes later to the Carolina Thunderbirds by general manager Dave Schultz. He then played one season for the Thunderbirds before moving on to the International Hockey League, where he would spend the majority of his career. In his rookie season in 1986–87 with the Flint Spirits, LeBlanc appeared in 63 games and was awarded the Ken McKenzie Trophy as the top American-born rookie in the league.

LeBlanc played for the IHL's Flint Spirits, Saginaw Hawks, Indianapolis Ice, Fort Wayne Komets, Cincinnati Cyclones and Chicago Wolves during his career. LeBlanc spent the final two seasons of his career with the Jacksonville Lizard Kings of the ECHL and retired after the 1999–2000 season.

LeBlanc appeared in one National Hockey League game in his career, playing for the Chicago Blackhawks during the 1991–92 season. His appearance came to allow the Blackhawks to exploit a loophole in the NHL's rules for the 1992 NHL Expansion Draft, where each team had to expose a goaltender who had appeared in at least one game during 1991–92. LeBlanc was activated and placed into his only game on March 10, 1992, therefore meaning the Blackhawks would not have to expose any of their top three goaltenders: Ed Belfour, Dominik Hašek and Jimmy Waite. LeBlanc allowed only one goal, earning the victory as the Blackhawks defeated the San Jose Sharks, 5–1.

== International play ==
At the 1992 Winter Olympics, LeBlanc appeared in all eight games for the United States, compiling a record of 5–2–1 with two shutouts. The Americans finished out of the medals, however, as they lost 6–1 to Czechoslovakia in the bronze medal game. He also played at the 1992 World Championships.

== Career statistics ==
=== Regular season and playoffs ===
			Regular season									Playoffs
Season	Team	League	GP	W	L	T	MIN	GA	SO	GAA	SV%	GP	W	L	MIN	GA	SO	GAA	SV%
1981–82	Markham Waxers	OJHL	39	17	16	5	2236	188	0	4.99	—	—	—	—	—	—	—	—	—
1982–83	Markham Waxers	OJHL	6	2	2	1	305	28	0	5.55	—	—	—	—	—	—	—	—	—
1982–83	Dixie Beehives	OJHL	29	16	8	3	1722	111	0	3.90	—	—	—	—	—	—	—	—	—
1983–84	Kitchener Rangers	OHL	54	39	7	1	2965	185	1	3.74	—	—	—	—	—	—	—	—	—
1983–84	Kitchener Rangers	M-Cup	—	—	—	—	—	—	—	—	—	4	3	1	240	18	0	4.50	—
1984–85	Pinebridge Bucks	ACHL	40	—	—	—	2178	150	0	4.13	—	—	—	—	—	—	—	—	—
1985–86	Carolina Thunderbirds	ACHL	42	—	—	—	2505	133	3	3.19	—	11	8	3	669	42	0	3.77	—
1986–87	Flint Spirits	IHL	64	33	23	1	3417	222	0	3.90	—	4	1	3	233	17	0	4.38	—
1987–88	Flint Spirits	IHL	62	27	19	8	3269	239	1	4.39	—	16	10	6	925	55	1	3.57	—
1988–89	Flint Spirits	IHL	15	5	9	0	852	67	0	4.72	—	—	—	—	—	—	—	—	—
1988–89	New Haven Nighthawks	AHL	1	0	0	0	20	3	0	9.00	.769	—	—	—	—	—	—	—	—
1988–89	Saginaw Hawks	IHL	29	19	7	2	1655	99	0	3.59	—	1	0	1	59	3	0	3.05	—
1989–90	Indianapolis Ice	IHL	23	15	6	2	1334	71	2	3.19	—	—	—	—	—	—	—	—	—
1989–90	Fort Wayne Komets	IHL	15	3	3	3	680	44	0	3.88	—	3	0	2	139	11	0	4.75	—
1990–91	Fort Wayne Komets	IHL	21	10	8	0	1072	69	0	3.86	—	—	—	—	—	—	—	—	—
1990–91	Indianapolis Ice	IHL	3	2	0	0	145	7	0	2.90	—	1	0	0	19	1	0	3.20	—
1991–92	Chicago Blackhawks	NHL	1	1	0	0	60	1	0	1.00	.955	—	—	—	—	—	—	—	—
1991–92	American National Team	Intl	17	5	10	1	891	54	0	3.63	—	—	—	—	—	—	—	—	—
1991–92	Indianapolis Ice	IHL	25	14	9	2	1468	84	2	3.43	—	—	—	—	—	—	—	—	—
1992–93	Indianapolis Ice	IHL	56	23	22	7	3201	206	0	3.86	—	5	1	4	276	23	0	5.00	—
1993–94	Indianapolis Ice	IHL	2	0	1	0	112	8	0	4.25	—	—	—	—	—	—	—	—	—
1993–94	Cincinnati Cyclones	IHL	34	17	9	3	1779	104	1	3.51	—	5	0	3	159	9	0	3.39	—
1994–95	Chicago Wolves	IHL	44	19	14	6	2375	129	1	3.26	.909	3	0	3	177	14	0	4.73	—
1995–96	Chicago Wolves	IHL	31	10	14	2	1614	97	0	3.61	.900	—	—	—	—	—	—	—	—
1996–97	Chicago Wolves	IHL	38	15	14	2	1911	103	2	3.23	.893	—	—	—	—	—	—	—	—
1997–98	Chicago Wolves	IHL	14	9	3	0	728	34	0	2.80	.900	—	—	—	—	—	—	—	—
1997–98	Flint Generals	UHL	29	12	4	5	1303	79	2	3.64	.885	—	—	—	—	—	—	—	—
1998–99	Jacksonville Lizard Kings	ECHL	53	29	19	1	2982	163	1	3.28	.900	2	0	2	118	8	0	4.07	.867
1999–00	Jacksonville Lizard Kings	ECHL	56	22	25	8	3030	183	0	3.62	.908	—	—	—	—	—	—	—	—
IHL totals			476	221	361	38	25,609	1586	9	3.72	—	38	12	22	1987	133	1	4.01	—
NHL totals			2	1	0	0	70	5	0	4.35	.815	—	—	—	—	—	—	—	—

=== International ===
Year	Team	Event	GP	W	L	T	MIN	GA	SO	GAA	SV%
1992	United States	OLY	8	5	2	1	463	17	2	2.20	.943
1992	United States	WC	5	—	—	—	—	—	—	3.79	.877
Senior totals			13	—	—	—	—	—	—	—	—

== Awards ==
- Ken McKenzie Trophy (best American-born rookie in the IHL): 1986–87 season

== See also ==
- List of players who played only one game in the NHL
