= Wayne Van Dorp =

Canadian ice hockey player

- Born: May 19, 1961 (age 63); Vancouver, British Columbia, Canada
- Height: 6 ft 4 in (193 cm)
- Weight: 225 lb (102 kg; 16 st 1 lb)
- Position: Left wing
- Shot: Left
- Played for: Edmonton Oilers; Pittsburgh Penguins; Chicago Blackhawks; Quebec Nordiques; Feenstra Flyers Heerenveen; GIJS Groningen
- National team: Netherlands
- NHL draft: Undrafted
- Playing career: 1983–1995

Wayne Van Dorp (born May 19, 1961) is a Canadian former professional ice hockey player. He played for the Edmonton Oilers, Pittsburgh Penguins, Chicago Blackhawks and Quebec Nordiques. In The Netherlands he played for Feenstra Flyers Heerenveen and Gijs Groningen. He has a Stanley Cup ring with Edmonton for playing three regular season games and three playoff games in 1987. However, Van Dorp did not play enough regular season games (40) or a game in the finals to get his name on the Stanley Cup. Van Dorp played for the Netherlands national ice hockey team in the 1986 World Ice Hockey Championships, Pool B.

== Career statistics ==
			Regular season					Playoffs
Season	Team	League	GP	G	A	Pts	PIM	GP	G	A	Pts	PIM
1978–79	Bellingham Blazers	BCJHL	26	12	10	22	106	—	—	—	—	—
1979–80	Seattle Breakers	WHL	68	8	13	21	195	12	3	1	4	33
1980–81	Seattle Breakers	WHL	63	22	30	52	242	5	1	0	1	10
1983–84	Erie Golden Blades	ACHL	45	19	18	37	202	8	1	2	3	46
1984–85	GIJS Groningen	Netherlands	29	38	46	84	112	—	—	—	—	—
1984–85	Erie Golden Blades	ACHL	7	9	8	17	21	10	0	2	2	62
1985–86	GIJS Groningen	Netherlands	29	19	24	43	81	—	—	—	—	—
1986–87	Nova Scotia Oilers	AHL	11	2	3	5	37	5	0	0	0	56
1986–87	Rochester Americans	AHL	47	7	3	10	192	—	—	—	—	—
1986–87	Edmonton Oilers	NHL	3	0	0	0	25	3	0	0	0	2
1987–88	Nova Scotia Oilers	AHL	12	2	2	4	87	—	—	—	—	—
1987–88	Pittsburgh Penguins	NHL	25	1	3	4	75	—	—	—	—	—
1988–89	Saginaw Hawks	IHL	11	4	3	7	60	—	—	—	—	—
1988–89	Rochester Americans	AHL	28	3	6	9	202	—	—	—	—	—
1988–89	Chicago Blackhawks	NHL	8	0	0	0	23	16	0	1	1	17
1989–90	Chicago Blackhawks	NHL	61	7	4	11	303	8	0	0	0	23
1990–91	Quebec Nordiques	NHL	4	1	0	1	30	—	—	—	—	—
1991–92	Halifax Citadels	AHL	15	5	5	10	54	—	—	—	—	—
1991–92	Quebec Nordiques	NHL	24	3	5	8	109	—	—	—	—	—
1992–93	Milwaukee Admirals	IHL	19	1	4	5	57	—	—	—	—	—
1992–93	HC Fiemme Cavalese	Italy	9	1	4	5	57	—	—	—	—	—
NHL totals			125	12	12	24	565	27	0	1	1	42
