= Pierre Hamel =

Canadian ice hockey player

- Born: September 16, 1952 (age 73) Montreal, Quebec, Canada
- Height: 5 ft 9 in (175 cm)
- Weight: 170 lb (77 kg; 12 st 2 lb)
- Position: Goaltender
- Caught: Right
- Played for: Toronto Maple Leafs; Winnipeg Jets
- NHL draft: Undrafted
- Playing career: 1974–1985

Pierre Hamel (born September 16, 1952) is a Canadian former professional ice hockey goaltender who played 69 games in the National Hockey League. He played for the Toronto Maple Leafs and Winnipeg Jets between 1974 and 1981.

== Career statistics ==
=== Regular season and playoffs ===
			Regular season									Playoffs
Season	Team	League	GP	W	L	T	MIN	GA	SO	GAA	SV%	GP	W	L	MIN	GA	SO	GAA	SV%
1969–70	Verdun Maple Leafs	QMJHL	12	—	—	—	680	79	0	6.97	—	1	0	0	6	1	0	10.00	—
1970–71	Verdun Maple Leafs	QMJHL	43	—	—	—	2580	200	0	2.65	—	1	0	1	30	7	0	14.00	—
1971–72	Laval National	QMJHL	15	—	—	—	870	86	0	5.93	—	—	—	—	—	—	—	—	—
1971–72	Drummondville Rangers	QMJHL	34	—	—	—	2000	120	1	3.60	—	8	—	—	450	28	0	3.73	—
1973–74	Trail Smoke Eaters	WIHL	—	—	—	—	—	—	—	—	—	—	—	—	—	—	—	—	—
1973–74	Salt Lake Golden Eagles	WHL	1	0	1	0	60	4	0	4.00	.857	—	—	—	—	—	—	—	—
1974–75	Toronto Maple Leafs	NHL	4	1	2	0	195	18	0	5.55	.855	—	—	—	—	—	—	—	—
1974–75	Oklahoma City Blazers	CHL	44	22	12	6	2349	125	3	3.19	—	1	0	0	22	2	0	5.45	—
1975–76	Oklahoma City Blazers	CHL	39	14	12	6	2038	107	2	3.15	—	2	0	2	82	8	0	5.85	—
1976–77	Oklahoma City Blazers	CHL	33	5	19	4	1696	162	0	5.73	.851	—	—	—	—	—	—	—	—
1977–78	Dallas Black Hawks	CHL	36	15	16	1	1982	126	0	3.81	.881	1	0	0	20	2	0	6.00	—
1978–79	Toronto Maple Leafs	NHL	1	0	0	0	1	0	0	0.00	1.000	—	—	—	—	—	—	—	—
1978–79	New Brunswick Hawks	AHL	37	18	12	5	2068	119	0	2.45	.893	3	1	2	187	13	0	4.17	—
1979–80	Winnipeg Jets	NHL	35	9	19	3	1939	130	0	4.02	.877	—	—	—	—	—	—	—	—
1980–81	Winnipeg Jets	NHL	29	3	20	4	1620	128	0	4.74	.861	—	—	—	—	—	—	—	—
1980–81	Tulsa Oilers	CHL	9	2	5	1	478	33	0	4.14	.872	—	—	—	—	—	—	—	—
1981–82	Tulsa Oilers	CHL	5	3	1	0	247	14	0	3.40	.880	—	—	—	—	—	—	—	—
1981–82	Fredericton Express	AHL	29	5	15	3	1571	114	1	4.35	—	—	—	—	—	—	—	—	—
1982–83	Sherbrooke Jets	AHL	2	1	1	0	119	6	0	3.02	.930	—	—	—	—	—	—	—	—
1982–83	Düsseldorfer EG	GER	—	—	—	—	—	—	—	—	—	—	—	—	—	—	—	—	—
1983–84	Carolina Thunderbirds	ACHL	38	25	10	2	2192	151	0	4.13	.863	8	—	—	500	26	0	3.12	—
1984–85	Carolina Thunderbirds	ACHL	36	28	3	0	1909	109	1	3.42	.853	8	—	—	452	27	0	3.58	—
NHL totals			69	13	41	7	3755	276	0	4.41	.869	—	—	—	—	—	—	—	—
