= Bill Coffey =

American businessman and sports entrepreneur

Bill Coffey is a businessman and minor league sports entrepreneur. He is one of the founders of the ECHL (formerly known as the East Coast Hockey League).

Coffey is also the founder of the Atlantic Coast Hockey League (ACHL). He served as the league's president, and he is the director of hockey operations for the Southern Professional Hockey League (SPHL). Coffey has been the owner of several minor league ice hockey teams.

== Teams owned by Bill Coffey ==
- Fayetteville Force (CHL)
- Knoxville Cherokees (ECHL)
- St. Petersburg Parrots (ACHL)
- Tallahassee Tide (ACHL)
- Greensboro Monarchs (ECHL)
- Winston-Salem Thunderbirds (ECHL)
