= Bill Huard =

Canadian ice hockey player

- Born: June 24, 1967 (age 59) Welland, Ontario, Canada
- Height: 6 ft 1 in (185 cm)
- Weight: 215 lb (98 kg; 15 st 5 lb)
- Position: Left wing
- Shot: Left
- Played for: Boston Bruins; Ottawa Senators; Quebec Nordiques; Dallas Stars; Edmonton Oilers; Los Angeles Kings
- NHL draft: Undrafted
- Playing career: 1988–2000

William John Huard (born June 24, 1967) is a Canadian former professional ice hockey player. He played in the National Hockey League between 1992 and 1999 with six teams. The rest of his career, which lasted from 1988 to 2000, was spent in different minor leagues.

== Career ==
Huard had a professional career of over 600 games, including parts of seven seasons at the National Hockey League (NHL) with the Boston Bruins, Ottawa Senators, Quebec Nordiques, Dallas Stars, Edmonton Oilers and Los Angeles Kings.

Huard moved to the United Kingdom in 2000 to play in the British Ice Hockey Superleague for the London Knights but left the team after playing just one game to return to Canada to be with his girlfriend who was seven months pregnant at the time.

== Personal life ==
In Huard's hometown of Welland, the local hockey arena has a tribute to his playing career.

One of Huard's sons, Colton, played junior hockey for the Aberdeen Wings in the North American Hockey League.

== Career statistics ==
=== Regular season and playoffs ===
			Regular season					Playoffs
Season	Team	League	GP	G	A	Pts	PIM	GP	G	A	Pts	PIM
1984–85	Fort Erie Meteors	GHJHL	41	4	9	13	114	—	—	—	—	—
1985–86	Welland Cougars	GHJHL	28	8	17	25	123	—	—	—	—	—
1985–86	Peterborough Petes	OHL	7	1	1	2	2	—	—	—	—	—
1986–87	Peterborough Petes	OHL	61	14	11	25	61	12	5	2	7	19
1987–88	Peterborough Petes	OHL	66	28	33	61	132	12	7	8	15	33
1988–89	Carolina Thunderbirds	ECHL	40	27	21	48	177	10	7	2	9	70
1988–89	Flint Spirits	IHL	1	0	0	0	2	—	—	—	—	—
1989–90	Utica Devils	AHL	27	1	7	8	67	5	0	1	1	33
1989–90	Nashville Knights	ECHL	34	24	27	51	212	—	—	—	—	—
1990–91	Utica Devils	AHL	72	11	16	27	359	—	—	—	—	—
1991–92	Utica Devils	AHL	62	9	11	20	233	4	1	1	2	4
1992–93	Boston Bruins	NHL	2	0	0	0	0	—	—	—	—	—
1992–93	Providence Bruins	AHL	72	18	19	37	302	6	3	0	3	9
1993–94	Ottawa Senators	NHL	63	2	2	4	162	—	—	—	—	—
1994–95	Ottawa Senators	NHL	26	1	1	2	64	—	—	—	—	—
1994–95	Quebec Nordiques	NHL	7	2	2	4	13	1	0	0	0	0
1995–96	Dallas Stars	NHL	51	6	6	12	176	—	—	—	—	—
1995–96	Michigan K-Wings	IHL	12	1	1	2	74	—	—	—	—	—
1996–97	Dallas Stars	NHL	40	5	6	11	105	—	—	—	—	—
1997–98	Edmonton Oilers	NHL	30	0	1	1	72	4	0	0	0	2
1998–99	Edmonton Oilers	NHL	3	0	0	0	0	—	—	—	—	—
1998–99	Houston Aeros	IHL	38	9	5	14	201	10	0	0	0	8
1999–00	Los Angeles Kings	NHL	1	0	0	0	2	—	—	—	—	—
1999–00	Lowell Lock Monsters	AHL	13	2	2	4	65	—	—	—	—	—
1999–00	Orlando Solar Bears	IHL	19	4	2	6	85	3	0	0	0	10
2000–01	London Knights	BISL	1	1	0	1	4	—	—	—	—	—
NHL totals			223	16	18	34	594	5	0	0	0	2
