= 1982–83 ACHL season =

The 1982–83 Atlantic Coast Hockey League season was the second season of the Atlantic Coast Hockey League, a North American minor professional league. Six teams participated in the regular season. The Salem Raiders, under new ownership from Henry Brabham, re-branded and changed their name to the Virginia Raiders before the season. The Hampton Roads Gulls folded mid-season. The Carolina Thunderbirds were the league champions.

== Regular season ==
	GP	W	L	T	GF	GA	Pts
Carolina Thunderbirds	68	51	10	7	376	208	111
Erie Golden Blades	64	39	21	4	345	276	83
Mohawk Valley Stars	65	30	33	2	311	306	64
Virginia Raiders	65	20	36	9	257	306	51
Hampton Roads Gulls	42	16	24	2	170	213	35
Nashville South Stars	58	11	43	4	239	389	28

== Playoffs ==
Semifinals
1	Carolina Thunderbirds	4
4	Virginia Raiders	0
2	Erie Golden Blades	3
3	Mohawk Valley Stars	4

Final
1	Carolina Thunderbirds	4
3	Mohawk Valley Stars	0
