= 1986–87 ACHL season =

Hockey season

The 1986–87 Atlantic Coast Hockey League season was the sixth season of the Atlantic Coast Hockey League, a North American minor professional league. Five teams participated in the regular season. The New York Slapshots moved to Troy, New York to be re-named the Troy Slapshots before they folded after only six games and merged the player roster with the league’s Mohawk Valley Comets franchise. The Virginia Lancers were the league champions.

== Regular season ==
	GP	W	L	T	GF	GA	Pts
Virginia Lancers	58	36	19	3	288	218	75
Erie Golden Blades	57	28	27	2	250	246	58
Mohawk Valley Comets	57	23	31	3	260	292	49
Carolina Thunderbirds	56	23	31	2	252	278	48
Troy Slapshots	6	2	4	0	20	36	4

== Playoffs ==
Semifinal
1	Virginia Lancers	4
4	Carolina Thunderbirds	1
2	Erie Golden Blades	2
3	Mohawk Valley Comets	4

Final
1	Virginia Lancers	4
3	Mohawk Valley Comets	3
