= 1985–86 ACHL season =

The 1985–86 Atlantic Coast Hockey League season was the fifth season of the Atlantic Coast Hockey League, a North American minor professional league. Five teams participated in the regular season. The new expansion franchise, the New York Slapshots, ran into construction problems on their new arena and with no place to play they became a travel team, playing all of their games on the road until late in the season when they found a temporary home ice in Virginia. The Carolina Thunderbirds were the league champions.

== Regular season ==
	GP	W	L	T	GF	GA	Pts
Carolina Thunderbirds	63	49	14	0	397	227	104
Erie Golden Blades	64	34	30	0	369	321	76
Virginia Lancers	62	28	34	0	299	340	61
Mohawk Valley Comets	62	23	39	0	259	332	49
New York Slapshots	59	21	38	0	260	367	43

== Playoffs ==
Semifinals
1	Carolina Thunderbirds	4
4	Mohawk Valley Comets	2
2	Erie Golden Blades	4
3	Virginia Lancers	1

Final
1	Carolina Thunderbirds	4
2	Erie Golden Blades	1
