= Joe Ferras =

Canadian ice hockey player

- Born: May 1, 1966 (age 60) Brantford, Ontario, Canada
- Height: 5 ft 10 in (178 cm)
- Weight: 183 lb (83 kg; 13 st 1 lb)
- Position: Centre
- Shot: Left
- Played for: AHL; Adirondack Red Wings; Halifax Citadels; ECHL; Winston-Salem Thunderbirds; Trenton Titans; BHL/BIHS; Streatham Redskins; Bracknell Bees; Italy; HC Fassa; HC Milano Saima; HC Devils Milano; WPHL; New Mexico Scorpions
- NHL draft: Undrafted
- Playing career: 1988–2000

Joe Ferras, also known as Joe Ferraccioli, (born May 1, 1966) is a Canadian former professional ice hockey player. Ferras is currently the general manager for the Rapid City Rush of the ECHL.

Ferras began his professional playing career in 1988, signing as a free agent with the Adirondack Red Wings of the American Hockey League (AHL). He went on to play 12 seasons of professional hockey in the North American minor leagues and Europe. An eye injury, while playing with the New Mexico Scorpions of the Western Professional Hockey League during the 1999–2000 season, ended his playing career, and Ferras began his coaching career as an assistant with the Scorpions.

From 2001 to 2006, Ferras served as the head coach of the Amarillo Rattlers in the Central Hockey League (CHL), and he was an assistant coach with the 2006-07 Bridgeport Sound Tigers of the AHL.

In 2007, Ferras was selected to be the inaugural head coach for the CHL expansion franchise, the Rapid City Rush, and in September 2013, following the resignation of the Rush's general manager Tim Hill, he assumed the dual role of head coach and general manager for the team. On February 18, 2016, he stepped down as head coach of the Rush but retained his position as general manager.
