= Carolina Thunderbirds =

Defunct professional ice hockey team

- City: Winston-Salem, North Carolina
- League: Atlantic Coast Hockey League; 1981–1987; All-American Hockey League; 1987–1988; East Coast Hockey League; 1988–1992
- Founded: 1981
- Home arena: Winston-Salem Memorial Coliseum; Winston-Salem Fairgrounds Annex
- Colors: Black, red, white, gold
- Owners: Dave Gusky (1981-82); Rick Dudley (1982–84); Bill Coffey (1984–88); John Baker, Phil Barber, and David Redmond (1986–90); Ed Broyhill (1989–98); Jamie Koufman (1991); John Redmond

Franchise history
- 1981–1982: Winston-Salem Thunderbirds
- 1982–1989: Carolina Thunderbirds
- 1989–1992: Winston-Salem Thunderbirds
- 1992–1996: Wheeling Thunderbirds
- 1996–present: Wheeling Nailers

Championships
- Regular season titles: 5 (1982–83, 1983–84, 1984–85, 1985–86, 1989–90)
- Playoff championships: 4 (1983, 1985, 1986, 1989)

The Carolina Thunderbirds were a professional ice hockey team located in Winston-Salem, North Carolina, United States. The Thunderbirds played their home games at the old Winston-Salem Memorial Coliseum before the arena was demolished in 1989. The team played in the Atlantic Coast Hockey League from 1981 to 1987, the All-American Hockey League during 1987–88 and finally moved into the newly created East Coast Hockey League in 1988.

The Carolina Thunderbirds were one of five teams that played during the inaugural season of East Coast Hockey League (ECHL). The Thunderbirds won the first ever ECHL championship and were awarded the Riley Cup for the 1988–89 ECHL season.

The team changed its name to the Winston-Salem Thunderbirds before the start of 1989–90 season and the team remained in the ECHL until the end of the 1991–92 season when it was announced by co-owner Ed Broyhill that Winston-Salem would move to West Virginia to play as the Wheeling Thunderbirds.

== Team history ==
The new franchise in Winston-Salem was awarded to a Cincinnati group headed by businessman Dave Gusky in 1981. The team was named the Winston-Salem Thunderbirds and were the second professional hockey team to be based in Winston-Salem, North Carolina, after the Winston-Salem Polar Twins, who played in the Southern Hockey League from 1973 to 1977. The Thunderbirds began in the inaugural 1981–82 season of the Atlantic Coast Hockey League (ACHL) and played their home games at the old Winston-Salem Memorial Coliseum, with capacity of 5,500 for hockey games. During the season, Gusky called recently retired former Buffalo Sabres' player Rick Dudley and asked for help with the struggling team. Dudley originally planned on staying for a few weeks to evaluate the team but realized the team would fold if he left. Dudley proposed that he would stay with the team and try to sell the franchise for Gusky and if that did not work, he would buy the team himself. After three of the seven teams had folded during the season, the league decided to end early and set the playoffs with the four remaining teams by geographical area to save on travel expenses. In their inaugural season, the team would finished 14–33–3 under head coach Curry Whittaker. The Salem Raiders defeated the Thunderbirds in five games in the playoffs.

After the first season, Dudley bought the team from Gusky and replaced Whittaker as the head coach. Dudley then rebranded the team as the Carolina Thunderbirds. Former Colorado Rockies player Dave Watson also joined the team and led the league in scoring with 102 points, 53 goals, and 49 assists. Starting in 1982 the team won four consecutive ACHL regular-season championships. The team improved to finish with a league-best 51–10–7 record in their second season. The team allowed only 208 goals (3.06 per game), the lowest per game average in team history, while also leading the league in scoring. Defenseman Rory Cava led the league with 60 assists during the season and was awarded with the ACHL Most Valuable Player (MVP) after the season. Watson and Michel Lanouette earned first team selections to the ACHL All-Star team, while Brian Carroll and Randy Irving had second team selections for their performances. Watson continued to lead the team in the postseason, leading the league in scoring with 14 points. They won their first Bob Payne Trophy, awarded to the playoff champion, in 1983 after defeating the Mohawk Valley Stars in four games, going 8–0 through the playoffs.

The following season, Watson was limited to 29 games during the regular season, but he was healthy again for the playoffs. Goaltender Pierre Hamel and Irving became first team selections to the ACHL All-Star team following the regular season. The Thunderbirds beat the Mohawk Valley Stars in the playoffs to return to the finals. In the finals, against the Erie Golden Blades, the Thunderbirds lost the championship in five games. Bill Coffey assumed team ownership from Rick Dudley in 1984. The team had their best regular season during the 1984–85 season with a 53–10–1 record with Watson again leading the team with 85 points. John Torchetti began his professional hockey career with the Thunderbirds, while Irving and Bob Hagan were named first team ACHL All-Stars for the season. After defeating the Virginia Lancers, they met the Blades again in the 1985 finals with the Thunderbirds defeating them in six games to win their second league championship. Watson led the league in assists during the playoffs with 14 while Brian Carroll was awarded the ACHL Playoff MVP award for his 11 goals and 9 assists. In the 1985–86 season, the team had a 49–14–0 record. Center Joe Curran, scored 42 goals and league best 82 assists for a total of 124 points, was awarded the team's second ACHL MVP after the season. Goaltender Ray LeBlanc was a first team selection to the ACHL All-Star team and Irving was a second team selection. Dave Watson, who only played in nine games during the season, played in his last playoffs as he would retire after the season. In the 1986 finals, the Thunderbirds and Blades faced off for the third time, with the Thunderbirds winning in five games to become the only team to win consecutive ACHL championships. Bob Doré was awarded the ACHL Playoff MVP award.

After winning three championships in four years, Dudley moved up to become the head coach of the Flint Spirits in the International Hockey League and former Thunderbird player Mark Huglen was hired as the new coach. Huglen was unable to get the same results and after a poor 12–16 record to start the season, including 11 straight losses, he was replaced by another former Thunderbird player, Pierre Hamel. The team finished the season 23–31–2 with 48 points, enough for the fourth seed in the playoffs. The team lost in the semifinals to the Virginia Lancers in five games. Despite the team's down year, the Thunderbird's Doug McCarthy led the league in both assists and points and Scott Knutson was awarded with the ACHL Rookie Of The Year.

In 1987, the ACHL merged into the All-American Hockey League (AAHL). Hamel started the season as head coach but was replaced by another former Thunderbird player, Brian Carroll, mid-season. The Thunderbirds went on to finish second in the standings with a 34–15–0 record, 68 points, and seven points behind the first place Virginia Lancers. John Torchetti set season records with 63 goals scored and 134 points and was a first team AAHL All-Star. Torchetti also was named the AAHL MVP after the season. In the AAHL playoffs, the Thunderbirds were beaten by Virginia in the championship series to finish their only season in the AAHL.

The team was one of the founding five teams to form the East Coast Hockey League (ECHL) in the 1988. Bill Coffey sold the team to minority owner John Baker during the season. On October 28, 1988, the Thunderbirds played at the Johnstown Chiefs in the first game in ECHL history. The team's 1988–89 regular season was mediocre and the team went through four different head coaches. Incumbent head coach Brian Carroll was replaced early in the season by Joe Selenski. Keith McAdams then filled in as head coach for one game before the team hired Brendon Watson as head coach on February 19 with only 13 games left in the season. Watson coached the team to 8 wins in the final 13 games before the playoffs. The team struggled on defense during the regular season, with a 5.48 goals against average (GAA) per game. With a 27–32–1 record, the team finished in fourth place in the five team league. As the fourth seed, the Thunderbirds swept the regular season champion Erie Panthers in four games. In the inaugural ECHL championships, the Thunderbirds faced the Johnstown Chiefs. The Thunderbirds lost game one at the Chiefs 8–1 as the Chiefs scored four power play goals during the game. After losing the first two games by a combined score of 14–2 in Johnstown, the Thunderbirds won the next three games to take a series lead 3–2, putting the Thunderbirds one win away from the title. Game two had a combined 186 penalty minutes between the teams. During the series, the ice at Winston-Salem Coliseum melted prior to game four because a compressor shut down during the night. The originally scheduled game five in Johnstown became game four and the Thunderbirds hosted game five back at home. The Chiefs' Tom Sasso scored two shorthand goals to help his team even the series in game six by defeating the Thunderbirds 7–4, a game that included several fights. After the game, in an effort to protect the league's image, ECHL commissioner Pat Kelly suspended three (Steve Plakson, Bill Huard and Michael Lanouette) of the Thunderbirds' players. As a result, the Thunderbirds were forced to face the Chiefs in the seventh and deciding game with just 11 skaters. Coach Watson used a plan of changing personal on every whistle during game seven to slow down the pace of the game and buy as much rest for the few players he had available as possible. In spite of this set back, in the final game of the series, The Thunderbirds beat the Chiefs 7–4 to win the first ECHL Championship, and were awarded the Riley Cup for the season. Goaltender Nick Vitucci was named the Most Valuable Player for the playoffs. In the series, John Devereaux and E.J. Sauer lead the Thunderbirds in goals with five each, Bob Wensley lead the team with eight assists, and Randy Irving lead the team with nine points from three goals and six assists. As of 2018, three Thunderbirds' players still held the top three spots for the ECHL record for the most penalty minutes in a finals series from that year; Steve Plaskon with 95, Michel Lanouette with 68 and Bill Huard with 58. Six Thunderbirds scored one power play goal each and Sauer scored the team's only short–handed goal, during game three, of the series.

In 1989, the team name changed back to the Winston-Salem Thunderbirds. The team also began playing at the new Winston-Salem Fairgrounds Annex after the old Winston-Salem Memorial Coliseum was demolished. Chris McSorley was hired to replace Brendon Watson as head coach before the season, McSorley's first experience as head coach. McSorley led the Thunderbirds to the top of the ECHL standings before a power struggle between him and general manager Jay Fraser led to Fraser replacing McSorley as head coach for the remainder of the season. Len Soccio, Joe Ferras and Trent Kaese all finished in the top four of the league scoring, while goaltenders Paul Cohen and Kenton Rein both finished the season in the top five for goals against average (GAA) in the league. The team finished as regular season champions with a 38–16–7 record and 82 points. The team was awarded the Henry Brabham Cup trophy, given regular season champions. The team defeated the Nashville Knights in five games to reach the finals. In the finals, the team faced their in-state rival Greensboro Monarchs. The teams split the first two games in Winston-Salem, with a 5–3 Greensboro win in game one and a 6–3 win for the Thunderbirds in game two. Game two had a combined 226 penalty minutes between the teams breaking the record from the year before. Greensboro won 5–1 at home in game three. Game four, also in Greensboro, went into double overtime time with the Monarchs winning. Game four was the longest game in ECHL finals history up to that point, but has since been surpassed. Each team had 67 shots on goal in the game for a 134 total, all of which are ECHL finals records as of 2018. Monarchs' goaltender, Wade Flaherty, made 64 saves as the Thunderbird's goaltender, Kenton Rein, had 63 saves. The series returned to Winston-Salem, but the Thunderbirds lost game five and the championship four-games-to-one. During the finals series, the Thunderbirds were led by Troy Vollhoffer with four goals, Dave Doucette and Len Soccio with five assists each, while Soccio also lead the team with seven points. John Torchetti scored the team's only power play goal (during game four) and Vollhoffer had two of the team's three short-handed goals. Soccio was the ECHL playoffs scoring leader with 17 points. Irving retired after the season as the team leader in seasons with the team, all-time games played and all-time postseason assists, and as one of the only two players with the Thunderbirds to play in all five playoffs championships.

The following 1990–91 season, the league was aligned to include two separate divisions, East and West. The Thunderbirds were placed in the West Division, posted a record of 20–41–3 and failed to make the playoffs for the first time. Fraser stepped down as head coach mid-season to return to only general manager duties and Marcel Comeau, previously the head coach of the New Haven Nighthawks of the American Hockey League before being let go earlier in the season, was named as his replacement. The team placed in the East Division the following season. Doug Sauter was hired as the new head coach before the 1991–92 season and improved the team to a third-place finish in the East Division with a 36–24–4 record, winning the ECHL Coach of the Year award. Goaltender Frédéric Chabot led the league with the best goals against average (GAA) during the season at 2.94 per game. In the playoffs, the Thunderbirds lost to the Richmond Renegades in the first round in five games.

After the end of the 1991–92 season, it was announced by co-owner Ed Broyhill that Winston-Salem would move to West Virginia to play as the Wheeling Thunderbirds.

== Season-by-season results ==
Regular Season											Playoffs				
Season	League	GP	W	L	T	OTL	Pts	GF	GA	Standing	Year	1st round	Quarterfinals	Semifinals	Finals
Winston-Salem Thunderbirds
1981–82	ACHL	50	14	33	3	—	31	179	265	5th	1982	—	—	L, 1–4, SAL	—
Carolina Thunderbirds
1982–83	ACHL	68	51	10	7	—	111	376	208	1st	1983	—	—	W, 4–0, VIR	W, 4–0, MV
1983–84	ACHL	72	43	24	5	—	92	381	300	1st	1984	—	—	W, 4–1, MV	L, 1–4, ERI
1984–85	ACHL	64	53	10	1	—	107	374	220	1st	1985	—	—	W, 4–0, VIR	W, 4–2, ERI
1985–86	ACHL	63	49	14	0	—	104	397	227	1st	1986	—	—	W, 4–2, MV	W, 4–1, ERI
1986–87	ACHL	56	23	31	2	—	48	252	278	4th	1987	—	—	L, 1–4, VIR	—
1987–88	AAHL	49	34	15	0	—	68	355	182	2nd	1988	Lost championship vs. Virginia Lancers			
1988–89	ECHL	60	27	32	—	1	55	266	329	4th	1989	—	—	W, 4–0, ERI	W, 4–3, JOH
Winston-Salem Thunderbirds
1989–90	ECHL	60	38	16	—	7	82	312	257	1st	1990	—	W, 4–1, NAS	BYE	L, 1–4, GRE
1990–91	ECHL	64	20	41	—	3	43	228	323	6th, West	1991	Did not qualify			
1991–92	ECHL	64	36	24	—	4	76	270	245	3rd, East	1992	L, 2–3, RIC	—	—	—

== Head coaches ==
- Curry Whittaker 1981–82
- Rick Dudley 1982–86
- Mark Huglen 1986–87
- Pierre Hamel 1986–88 (midseason replacement of Huglen)
- Brian Carroll 1987–89 (midseason replacement of Hamel)
- Joe Selenski 1988–89 (midseason replacement of Carroll)
- Keith McAdams 1988–89 (midseason one game replacement of Selenski)
- Brendon Watson 1988–89 (midseason replacement of McAdams)
- Chris McSorley 1989–90
- Jay Fraser 1989–91 (midseason replacement of McSorley)
- Marcel Comeau 1990–91 (midseason replacement of Fraser)
- Doug Sauter 1991–92

== Championships ==
- 1982–83: ACHL regular season champions
- 1982–83: ACHL playoff champions
- 1983–84: ACHL regular season champions
- 1984–85: ACHL regular season champions
- 1984–85: ACHL playoff champions
- 1985–86: ACHL regular season champions
- 1985–86: ACHL playoff champions
- 1988–89: ECHL playoff champions (Riley Cup)
- 1989–90: ECHL regular season champions

== Awards ==
=== All-Stars ===
ACHL All-Stars

- 1982–83: Dave Watson (1st team)
- 1982–83: Michel Lanouette, Forward (1st team)
- 1982–83: Brian Carroll, Forward (2nd team)
- 1982–83: Randy Irving, Defense (2nd team)
- 1983–84: Pierre Hamel, Goaltender (1st team)
- 1983–84: Randy Irving, Defense (1st team)
- 1984–85: Bob Hagan (1st team)
- 1984–85: Randy Irving, Defense (1st team)
- 1985–86: Ray LeBlanc, Goaltender (1st team)
- 1985–86: Randy Irving, Defense (2nd team)

AAHL All-Stars

- 1987-88: John Torchetti (1st team)

ECHL All-Stars

- 1988-89: Frank Lattuca, Defense
- 1989–90: Trent Kaese, Forward (1st team)
- 1989–90: Len Soccio, Forward (1st team)
- 1989–90: Dave Doucette, Defense (1st team)
- 1989–90: Joe Ferras, Forward (2nd team)
- 1991–92: Marc Laniel, Defense (2nd team)

=== MVP ===
ACHL MVP

- 1982–83: Rory Cava
- 1985–86: Joe Curran

AAHL MVP

- 1987-88: John Torchetti

ACHL Playoff MVP

- 1984–85: Brian Carroll
- 1985–86: Bob Doré

Riley Cup Playoffs MVP

- 1989: Nick Vitucci, Goaltender

=== Rookie Of The Year ===
ACHL Rookie Of The Year

- 1986–87: Scott Knutson

=== Coach of the Year ===
ECHL John Brophy Award

- 1991–92: Doug Sauter

=== ECHL Player of the Week ===
1988–89

- 11/16–11/22: John Devereaux
- 11/29-12/6: Brian Hannon
- 3/1–3/7: Bill Huard
- 3/15–3/21: Nick Vitucci
- 3/15–3/21: Steve Plaskon
- 3/15–3/21: Scott Rettew
- 3/15–3/21: John Torchetti
- 3/22–3/27: Nick Vitucci
- 3/22–3/27: John Torchetti
- 4/5–4/14: Nick Vitucci

=== Regular season champions ===
- 1982–1983: Carolina Thunderbirds
- 1983–1984: Carolina Thunderbirds
- 1984–1985: Carolina Thunderbirds
- 1985–1986: Carolina Thunderbirds
- 1989–1990: Winston-Salem Thunderbirds

=== Bob Payne Trophy winners ===
- 1982–83: Carolina Thunderbirds
- 1984–85: Carolina Thunderbirds
- 1985–86: Carolina Thunderbirds

=== Jack Riley Cup winners ===
- 1989: Carolina Thunderbirds

=== Henry Brabham Cup winners ===
- 1989–90: Winston-Salem Thunderbirds

== Notable NHL alumni ==
List of Carolina Thunderbirds/Winston-Salem Thunderbirds alumni who played more than 25 games in Carolina and 25 or more games in the National Hockey League.

- Frederic Chabot
- Kevin Dahl
- Bill Huard

== Franchise leaders ==
All-time and season leaders:

=== All-time regular season ===
- Games played: Randy Irving, 357
- Goals scored: John Torchetti, 237
- Assists: John Torchetti, 254
- Points: John Torchetti, 491
- Penalty minutes: Michel Lanouette, 945
- Seasons played: Randy Irving, 9 (1981–82 season to 1989–90 season)

=== All-time postseason ===
- Games played: Randy Irving, 71
- Goals scored: Brian Carroll, 27
- Assists: Randy Irving, 45
- Points: Brian Carroll, 59
- Penalty minutes: Michel Lanouette, 235
- Playoff seasons played: Randy Irving, 8 (1982–1986, 1988–1990 playoffs)
- Consecutive playoff seasons: Brian Carroll, 5 (1982–1986 playoffs); Randy Irving, 5 (1982–1986 playoffs); and John Torchetti, 5 (1985–1990 playoffs)
- Postseason Championships as a player: Randy Irving and Michel Lanouette, 5 (1983, 1985, and 1986 ACHL champions; 1988 AAHL champions; 1989 ECHL champions)
- Postseason Championships as head coach: Rick Dudley, 3 (1983, 1985, and 1986 ACHL champions)

=== All-time (including regular season & postseason) ===
- Games played: Randy Irving, 428
- Goals scored: John Torchetti, 261
- Assists: John Torchetti, 284
- Points: John Torchetti, 545
- Penalty minutes: Michel Lanouette, 1,180

=== Season records ===
- Goals scored: John Torchetti, 63 (1987–88)
- Assists: Joe Curran, 82 (1985–86)
- Points: John Torchetti, 134 (1987–88)
- Penalty minutes: Brian Gustafson, 354 (1983–84)

=== Postseason records ===
- Goals scored: Joe Curran, 12 (1986)
- Assists: Dave Watson, 14 (1985)
- Points: Andy Cozzi, 21 (1986)
- Penalty minutes: Steve Plaskon, 132 (1989)

== Attendance ==
Average per game:

- 1981–82: 1,973
- 1989–90: 2,620
- 1990–91: 1,837
- 1991–92: 2,114

Preceded by Inaugural	ECHL Riley Cup Champions; 1988–89	Succeeded by Greensboro Monarchs
