= Greensboro Monarchs =

Defunct minor professional ice hockey team

- City: Greensboro, North Carolina
- League: ECHL
- Division: West (1990–1991); East (1991–1995)
- Founded: 1989
- Operated: 1989–1995
- Home arena: Greensboro Coliseum
- Colors: Red, White, Blue
- Head coach: Jeff Brubaker (1989–1995)

Franchise history
- 1989–1995: Greensboro Monarchs
- 1995–1997: Carolina Monarchs
- 1997–1999: Beast of New Haven

The Greensboro Monarchs were a professional ice hockey team based in Greensboro, North Carolina. The Monarchs joined the East Coast Hockey League (ECHL) as an expansion franchise prior to the start of the 1989–90 season and surrendered the franchise back to the league when the Monarchs ownership obtained an expansion franchise in the American Hockey League (AHL) at the conclusion of the 1994–95 ECHL season.

== History ==
The Monarchs played in the ECHL from 1989 until 1995, reaching the playoffs in every season. They won the Riley Cup league championship in their inaugural season, beating the Winston-Salem Thunderbirds four games to one. Goalie Wade Flaherty was named playoff MVP. The Monarchs also reached the Riley Cup Finals in 1991 and 1995.

With some of the owners voting to enter the higher level American Hockey League, the franchise was canceled by the ECHL. The ownership renamed the new franchise the Carolina Monarchs and played in the AHL for the 1995–96 season before their lease was revoked by the Greensboro Coliseum when the Hartford Whalers of the National Hockey League (NHL) moved temporarily to Greensboro and became the Carolina Hurricanes. The Hurricanes then moved into their new arena and permanent home in Raleigh, North Carolina.

== Season-by-season results ==
Note: GP = Games played, W = Wins, L = Losses, OTL = Overtime losses, SOL = Shootout losses, Pts = Points, GF = Goals for, GA = Goals against, PIM = Penalties in minutes.

Regular Season											Playoffs				
Season	GP	W	L	OTL	SOL	Pts	GF	GA	PIM	Standing	Year	1st round	2nd round	3rd round	Riley Cup
1989–90	60	29	27	4	0	62	263	283	1875	4th of 8, ECHL	1990	—	W, 3–1, VIR	W, 2–0, ERI	W, 4–1, W-S
1990–91	64	34	27	3	0	71	275	268	2148	3rd of 6, West Div.	1991	—	W, 3–1, CIN	W, 4–0, LOU	L, 1–4, H-R
1991–92	64	43	17	4	0	90	297	252	2436	1st of 7, East Div.	1992	W, 4–3, RNK	BYE	L, 1–3, HAM	—
1992–93	64	33	29	2	0	68	256	261	2704	6th of 7, East Div.	1993	L, 0–1, ERI	—	—	—
1993–94	68	41	21	2	4	88	319	262	2181	3rd of 7, East Div.	1994	W, 2–1, CHR	L, 2–3, RAL	—	—
1994–95	68	31	28	9	0	71	277	293	2664	5th of 6. East Div.	1995	W, 3–0, CHR	W, 3–2, DAY	W, 3–2, NVL	L, 1–4, RMD

Preceded by Carolina Thunderbirds	Riley Cup Champions; 1989–90	Succeeded by Hampton Roads Admirals
