= Wade Flaherty =

Canadian ice hockey player (born 1968)

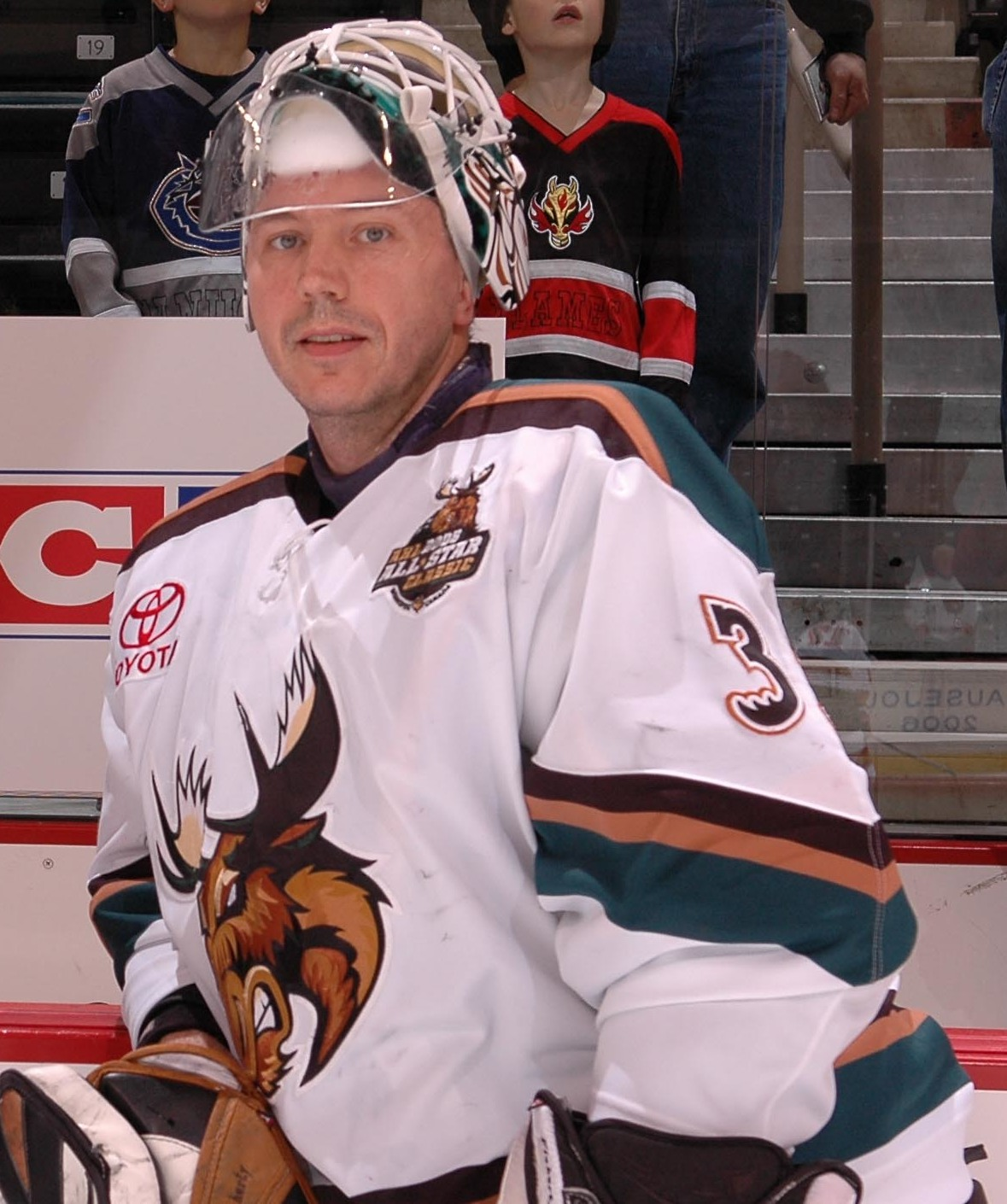
- Flaherty with the Manitoba Moose in 2006
- Born: January 11, 1968 (age 58) Terrace, British Columbia, Canada
- Height: 6 ft 0 in (183 cm)
- Weight: 190 lb (86 kg; 13 st 8 lb)
- Position: Goaltender
- Caught: Left
- Played for: San Jose Sharks; New York Islanders; Tampa Bay Lightning; Florida Panthers; Nashville Predators; China Sharks
- NHL draft: 181st overall, 1988; Buffalo Sabres
- Playing career: 1989–2009

Wade Flaherty (born January 11, 1968) is a Canadian former professional ice hockey goaltender who has played in the National Hockey League for the San Jose Sharks, New York Islanders, Tampa Bay Lightning, Florida Panthers, and the Nashville Predators, as well as several teams in the American Hockey League and ECHL. He last played professionally for the China Sharks of the Asia League Ice Hockey, before being named the developmental goaltending coach for the Chicago Blackhawks.

Flaherty was drafted 181st overall by the Buffalo Sabres in the 1988 NHL entry draft. While playing with the Islanders, Flaherty was the last NHL goalie to give up a goal to Wayne Gretzky.

Flaherty backed up Curtis Joseph for Team Canada in the 2007 Spengler Cup. In 2008, he signed with the China Sharks of the Asia League Ice Hockey, being named the starting goaltender and goaltender coach. Flaherty also assisted the Chinese national team in the same capacity. In January 2009, Flaherty was named goaltending coach for the Chicago Blackhawks.

Since the 2011–12 season, Flaherty has served as the goaltending coach for the Winnipeg Jets of the NHL.

== Career statistics ==
| | | | Regular season | | | | | | | | | Playoffs |
| Season | Team | League | GP | W | L | T/OT | MIN | GA | SO | GAA | SV% | GP | W | L | MIN | GA | SO | GAA | SV% |
|---|---|---|---|---|---|---|---|---|---|---|---|---|---|---|---|---|---|---|---|
| 1984–85 | Kelowna Wings | WHL | 1 | 0 | 1 | 0 | 55 | 5 | 0 | 5.45 | .808 | — | — | — | — | — | — | — | — |
| 1985–86 | Seattle Thunderbirds | WHL | 9 | 1 | 3 | 0 | 271 | 36 | 0 | 7.97 | — | — | — | — | — | — | — | — | — |
| 1985–86 | Spokane Chiefs | WHL | 5 | 0 | 3 | 0 | 161 | 21 | 0 | 7.83 | — | — | — | — | — | — | — | — | — |
| 1986–87 | Nanaimo Clippers | BCHL | 15 | — | — | — | — | — | — | 3.83 | — | — | — | — | — | — | — | — | — |
| 1986–87 | Victoria Cougars | WHL | 3 | 0 | 2 | 0 | 127 | 16 | 0 | 7.56 | — | — | — | — | — | — | — | — | — |
| 1987–88 | Victoria Cougars | WHL | 36 | 20 | 15 | 0 | 2052 | 135 | 0 | 3.95 | — | 5 | 2 | 3 | 300 | 18 | 0 | 3.60 | — |
| 1988–89 | Victoria Cougars | WHL | 42 | 21 | 19 | 0 | 2408 | 180 | 0 | 4.49 | .877 | 8 | — | — | — | — | — | — | — |
| 1989–90 | Greensboro Monarchs | ECHL | 27 | 12 | 9 | 1 | 1308 | 96 | 0 | 4.40 | .891 | 9 | — | — | — | — | — | — | — |
| 1989–90 | Kalamazoo Wings | IHL | 1 | 0 | 0 | 0 | 13 | 0 | 0 | 0.00 | 1.000 | — | — | — | — | — | — | — | — |
| 1990–91 | Kansas City Blades | IHL | 56 | 16 | 31 | 4 | 2990 | 224 | 0 | 4.49 | — | — | — | — | — | — | — | — | — |
| 1991–92 | Kansas City Blades | IHL | 43 | 26 | 14 | 3 | 2603 | 140 | 1 | 3.23 | .893 | 1 | 0 | 0 | 1 | 0 | 0 | 0.00 | 1.000 |
| 1991–92 | San Jose Sharks | NHL | 3 | 0 | 3 | 0 | 178 | 13 | 0 | 4.38 | .892 | — | — | — | — | — | — | — | — |
| 1992–93 | Kansas City Blades | IHL | 61 | 34 | 19 | 7 | 3642 | 195 | 2 | 3.21 | .888 | 12 | 6 | 6 | 733 | 34 | 1 | 2.78 | .903 |
| 1992–93 | San Jose Sharks | NHL | 1 | 0 | 1 | 0 | 60 | 5 | 0 | 5.02 | .891 | — | — | — | — | — | — | — | — |
| 1993–94 | Kansas City Blades | IHL | 60 | 32 | 19 | 9 | 3564 | 202 | 0 | 3.40 | .896 | — | — | — | — | — | — | — | — |
| 1994–95 | San Jose Sharks | NHL | 18 | 5 | 6 | 1 | 852 | 44 | 1 | 3.10 | .903 | 7 | 2 | 3 | 377 | 31 | 0 | 4.93 | .860 |
| 1995–96 | San Jose Sharks | NHL | 24 | 3 | 12 | 1 | 1137 | 92 | 0 | 4.85 | .866 | — | — | — | — | — | — | — | — |
| 1996–97 | San Jose Sharks | NHL | 7 | 2 | 4 | 0 | 359 | 31 | 0 | 5.18 | .847 | — | — | — | — | — | — | — | — |
| 1996–97 | Kentucky Thoroughblades | AHL | 19 | 8 | 6 | 2 | 1032 | 54 | 1 | 3.14 | .910 | 3 | 1 | 2 | 200 | 11 | 0 | 3.30 | .884 |
| 1997–98 | Utah Grizzlies | IHL | 24 | 16 | 5 | 3 | 1341 | 40 | 3 | 1.79 | .936 | — | — | — | — | — | — | — | — |
| 1997–98 | New York Islanders | NHL | 16 | 4 | 4 | 3 | 694 | 23 | 3 | 1.99 | .926 | — | — | — | — | — | — | — | — |
| 1998–99 | New York Islanders | NHL | 20 | 5 | 11 | 2 | 1048 | 53 | 0 | 3.03 | .892 | — | — | — | — | — | — | — | — |
| 1998–99 | Lowell Lock Monsters | AHL | 5 | 1 | 3 | 1 | 305 | 16 | 0 | 3.15 | .903 | — | — | — | — | — | — | — | — |
| 1999–00 | New York Islanders | NHL | 4 | 0 | 1 | 1 | 182 | 7 | 0 | 2.31 | .914 | — | — | — | — | — | — | — | — |
| 2000–01 | New York Islanders | NHL | 20 | 6 | 10 | 0 | 1017 | 56 | 1 | 3.30 | .881 | — | — | — | — | — | — | — | — |
| 2000–01 | Tampa Bay Lightning | NHL | 2 | 0 | 2 | 0 | 118 | 8 | 0 | 4.07 | .855 | — | — | — | — | — | — | — | — |
| 2001–02 | Utah Grizzlies | AHL | 45 | 22 | 13 | 5 | 2351 | 92 | 2 | 2.35 | .928 | 5 | 2 | 3 | 312 | 11 | 0 | 2.12 | .935 |
| 2001–02 | Florida Panthers | NHL | 4 | 2 | 1 | 1 | 245 | 12 | 0 | 2.94 | .919 | — | — | — | — | — | — | — | — |
| 2002–03 | San Antonio Rampage | AHL | 30 | 11 | 13 | 5 | 1791 | 86 | 1 | 2.88 | .914 | — | — | — | — | — | — | — | — |
| 2002–03 | Nashville Predators | NHL | 1 | 0 | 1 | 0 | 51 | 4 | 0 | 4.71 | .852 | — | — | — | — | — | — | — | — |
| 2003–04 | Milwaukee Admirals | AHL | 36 | 21 | 12 | 3 | 2146 | 78 | 3 | 2.18 | .922 | 21 | 16 | 5 | 1371 | 44 | 1 | 1.93 | .932 |
| 2004–05 | Manitoba Moose | AHL | 36 | 19 | 10 | 3 | 2009 | 78 | 4 | 2.33 | .918 | 12 | 8 | 4 | 720 | 29 | 2 | 2.42 | .912 |
| 2005–06 | Manitoba Moose | AHL | 49 | 26 | 17 | 4 | 2822 | 113 | 6 | 2.40 | .919 | 12 | 7 | 5 | 675 | 23 | 0 | 2.04 | .923 |
| 2006–07 | Manitoba Moose | AHL | 32 | 17 | 9 | 2 | 1735 | 70 | 2 | 2.42 | .909 | 3 | 2 | 1 | 166 | 5 | 0 | 1.81 | .924 |
| 2007–08 | Rockford IceHogs | AHL | 31 | 13 | 8 | 1 | 1486 | 63 | 2 | 2.54 | .917 | — | — | — | — | — | — | — | — |
| 2008–09 | China Sharks | AL | 36 | — | — | — | — | 118 | — | 3.29 | .917 | — | — | — | — | — | — | — | — |
| NHL totals | | | 120 | 27 | 56 | 11 | 5941 | 348 | 5 | 3.51 | .887 | 7 | 2 | 3 | 377 | 31 | 0 | 4.93 | .860 |

== Transactions ==
- June 11, 1988 - Drafted by Buffalo Sabres in the 9th round, 181st overall.
- September 3, 1991 - Signed by the San Jose Sharks as a free agent.
- July 22, 1996 - Signed by the New York Islanders as a free agent.
- February 16, 2001 - Traded to the Tampa Bay Lightning for future considerations.
- August 2, 2001 - Signed by the Florida Panthers as a free agent.
- March 9, 2003 - Traded to the Nashville Predators for Pascal Trepanier.
- July 7, 2004 - Signed by the Vancouver Canucks as a free agent.
- July 11, 2007 - Signed by the Chicago Blackhawks as a free agent.

| Preceded by Johan Holmqvist | Winner of the Jack A. Butterfield Trophy; 2003–04 | Succeeded by Antero Niittymäki |
