= 1989–90 ECHL season =

Ice hockey league season

The 1989–90 ECHL season was the second season of the ECHL. The league brought back all five teams from the inaugural season and added three more franchises in Greensboro, North Carolina, Nashville, Tennessee, and Norfolk, Virginia. Before the season began, the Carolina Thunderbirds changed their name to the Winston-Salem Thunderbirds. The eight teams played sixty games in the schedule, unchanged from the total games played in the inaugural 1988–89 ECHL season. The Winston-Salem Thunderbirds finished first overall in the regular season. The Greensboro Monarchs won their first Riley Cup championship.

== Regular season ==
Note: GP = Games played; W = Wins; L= Losses; OTL = Overtime losses; GF = Goals for; GA = Goals against; Pts = Points; Green shade = Clinched playoff spot

East Coast Hockey League	GP	W	L	OTL	Pts	GF	GA
Winston-Salem Thunderbirds	60	38	16	6	82	312	257
Erie Panthers	60	38	16	6	82	357	251
Virginia Lancers	60	36	18	6	78	261	218
Greensboro Monarchs	60	29	27	4	62	263	283
Hampton Roads Admirals	60	29	29	2	60	252	267
Nashville Knights	60	26	30	4	56	248	289
Johnstown Chiefs	60	23	31	6	52	233	291
Knoxville Cherokees	60	21	33	6	48	230	300

== Riley Cup playoffs ==
=== Bracket ===
Quarterfinals
2	Erie	3
5	Hampton Roads	2
3	Greensboro	3
4	Virginia	1

Semifinals
1	Winston-Salem	4
6	Nashville	1
2	Erie	0
3	Greensboro	2

Finals
1	Winston-Salem	1
3	Greensboro	4

=== 1st round ===
Winston-Salem vs. Nashville
Away	Home
Nashville 3	Winston-Salem 6
Winston-Salem 2	Nashville 6
Winston-Salem 5	Nashville 1
Nashville 2	Winston-Salem 7
Nashville 3	Winston-Salem 6
Winston-Salem wins series 4-1 and earns bye to Riley Cup Finals

Erie vs. Hampton Roads
Away	Home	
Hampton Roads 2	Erie 4	
Hampton Roads 5	Erie 4	OT
Erie 5	Hampton Roads 9	
Erie 4	Hampton Roads 3	
Hampton Roads 3	Erie 7	
Erie wins series 3-2

Greensboro vs. Virginia
Away	Home	
Greensboro 3	Virginia 2	
Greensboro 4	Virginia 5	OT
Virginia 1	Greensboro 3	
Virginia 3	Greensboro 4	
Greensboro wins series 3-1

=== 2nd round ===
Greensboro vs. Erie
Away	Home
Greensboro 4	Erie 3
Erie 2	Greensboro 3
Greensboro wins series 2-0

=== Riley Cup Finals ===
Winston-Salem vs. Greensboro
Away	Home	
Greensboro 5	Winston-Salem 3	
Greensboro 3	Winston-Salem 6	
Winston-Salem 1	Greensboro 5	
Winston-Salem 3	Greensboro 4	OT
Greensboro 4	Winston-Salem 1	
Greensboro wins series and Riley Cup 4-1

== ECHL awards ==
Jack Riley Cup:	Greensboro Monarchs
Henry Brabham Cup:	Winston-Salem Thunderbirds
ECHL Most Valuable Player:	Bill McDougall (Erie)
Riley Cup Playoffs Most Valuable Player:	Wade Flaherty (Greensboro)
ECHL Rookie of the Year:	Bill McDougall (Erie)
Defenseman of the Year:	Bill Whitfield (Virginia)
Leading Scorer:	Bill McDougall (Erie)

== All-Star teams ==
=== First All-Star Team ===
Forward: Bill McDougalli, Erie Panthers
Forward: Trent Kaese, Winston-Salem Thunderbirds
Forward: Len Soccio, Winston-Salem Thunderbirds
Defense: Dave Doucette, Winston-Salem Thunderbirds
Defense: Bill Whitfield, Virginia Lancers
Defense: Andre Brassard, Nashville Knights
Goaltender: Alain Raymond, Hampton Roads Admirals
Head coach: Dave Allison, Virginia Lancers

=== Second All-Star Team ===
Forward: Joe Ferras, Winston-Salem Thunderbirds
Forward: Glen Engevik, Nashville Knights
Forward: Trevor Jobe, Hampton Roads Admirals
Forward: Brian Martin, Hampton Roads Admirals
Defense: Scott Drevich, Virginia Lancers
Goaltender: Craig Barnett, Erie Panthers
Head coach: Ron Hansis, Erie Panthers

Note: The East Coast Hockey League did not hold an official All-Star game until the 1992–93 season. All-Star Teams were announced at the conclusion of the season.

== See also ==
- ECHL All-Star Game
- Kelly Cup
- List of ECHL seasons
- 1989 in sports
- 1990 in sports
