= 1983–84 ACHL season =

The 1983–84 Atlantic Coast Hockey League season was the third season of the Atlantic Coast Hockey League, a North American minor professional league. The Virginia Raiders folded in August 1983. Six teams participated in the regular season. The Birmingham Bulls folded after only three games. Henry Brabham bought the Nashville South Stars mid-season and moved the franchise to Salem, Virginia and renamed them as the Virginia Lancers. The Erie Golden Blades were the league champions.

== Regular season ==
	GP	W	L	T	GF	GA	Pts
Carolina Thunderbirds	72	43	24	5	381	300	92
Erie Golden Blades	72	42	26	4	377	310	91
Nashville South Stars/Virginia Lancers	73	34	37	2	384	400	71
Mohawk Valley Stars	74	28	39	7	322	370	68
Pinebridge Bucks	72	25	47	0	329	422	52
Birmingham Bulls	3	2	1	0	17	8	4

== Playoffs ==
Semifinals
1	Carolina Thunderbirds	4
4	Mohawk Valley Stars	1
2	Erie Golden Blades	4
3	Nashville South Stars/Virginia Lancers	0

Final
2	Erie Golden Blades	4
1	Carolina Thunderbirds	1
