= Virginia Lancers =

Defunct minor league ice hockey team

- City: Vinton, Virginia
- League: ACHL, AAHL, ECHL
- Founded: 1981 (In the CHL)
- Operated: 1983–1990
- Home arena: Vinton Sports Complex
- Colors: Blue, red, white

Franchise history
- 1981–1983: Nashville South Stars
- 1983–1990: Virginia Lancers
- 1990–1992: Roanoke Valley Rebels
- 1992–1993: Roanoke Valley Rampage
- 1993–1994: Huntsville Blast
- 1994–2001: Tallahassee Tiger Sharks
- 2001–2002: Macon Whoopee
- 2002–2003: Lexington Men O' War
- 2005–2026: Utah Grizzlies
- 2026-present: Trenton Ironhawks

Championships
- Regular season titles: 2 (1986–87, 1987–88)
- Playoff championships: 2 (1987, 1988)

The Virginia Lancers were a minor league hockey team that played in several leagues from 1983 until 1990. Their home ice was the Vinton Sports Complex, which held 3400 people.

== Atlantic Coast Hockey League (1983–1987) ==
The Virginia Lancers were founded as the result of the Nashville South Stars relocating in December 1983, halfway into the 1982–83 season of the ACHL. They continued to play in the ACHL from 1983 until 1987. John Tortorella, a former Lancer forward, stepped behind the bench in the 1986–87 season, leading the team to the league's best record and the Bob Payne Trophy, which is given to the team who wins the league championship.

== All-American Hockey League (1987–1988) ==
The Lancers transferred to the All-American Hockey League (AAHL) for the 1987-88 season. Coach Tortorella led the team to a 37-5-0-1 record, the best record in the league and won the league championship against the Carolina Thunderbirds. After the season, both Virginia and Carolina left the league to form the East Coast Hockey League (ECHL), along with the newly-formed Johnstown Chiefs and the AAHL folded a season later.

== East Coast Hockey League (1988–1990) ==
With a new coach and a new league, the Lancers found themselves outside of the postseason in their initial ECHL season. Finishing 22-30-8 put them in fifth place out of five teams. The Lancers found a replacement coach in Dave Allison for the 1989 season, and the team responded by finishing 36-18-6 with 76 points. The Lancers finished in third place out of four teams and faced fourth place Greensboro Monarchs in the playoffs. The Lancers lost the best-of-five series three games to one, which included back to back losses at Greensboro in Games 3 and 4.

== Name changes and relocation (1990–present) ==
Prior to the 1990–1991 season, the name was changed to the Roanoke Valley Rebels. They used this name for two seasons, and then became the Roanoke Valley Rampage for the 1992–93 season. Despite the name changes, the franchise remained in the same location throughout.

After the 1992–93 season, the franchise was moved to Alabama and became the Huntsville Blast. The Blast remained in Huntsville for one season before transferring to Tallahassee and being renamed the Tallahassee Tiger Sharks, where they played until the 2000–01 season. The Tiger Sharks ceased operations in 2001 but leased the team to the Macon Sports Group in Macon, Georgia and played as the Macon Whoopee for one season. Poor attendance and lack of corporate sponsorship caused the Whoopee to fold and the rights to the franchise were transferred to what eventually became the Lexington Men O' War. Attendance was also a problem in Lexington and the franchise went dormant in 2003. In 2005, the franchise was transferred and played as the Utah Grizzlies until 2026.

== Playoffs ==
- 1983–84: Lost to Erie 4-1 in semifinals.
- 1984–85: Lost to Carolina 4-0 in semifinals.
- 1985–86: Lost to Erie 4-1 in semifinals.
- 1986–87: Defeated Carolina 4-1 in semifinals; defeated Mohawk Valley 4-3 to win championship.
- 1987–88: Defeated Johnstown in round robin; defeated Carolina 4-1 to win championship.
- 1988–89: Did not qualify.
- 1989–90: Lost to Greensboro 3-1 in quarterfinals.

== Notable personnel ==
- Pierre Lagace – former Quebec Nordiques and Montreal Canadiens draft pick. Played 38 games for the Nordiques in the World Hockey Association over two seasons.
- Paul O'Neil – former player-coach who coached the Lancers from 1983–85. Played for the Vancouver Canucks and Boston Bruins of the National Hockey League and played one game for the Birmingham Bulls of the World Hockey Association.
- Mario Roberge – former Lancers forward who went on to play 112 games with the Montreal Canadiens of the National Hockey League from 1991–1995. Roberge was a member of the 1993 Stanley Cup-winning Canadiens team.
- John Torchetti – former Lancers forward who has coached in the QMJHL and NHL. He also served as an assistant coach with the Tampa Bay Lightning, interim head coach for the Florida Panthers, interim head coach of the Los Angeles Kings, and as an assistant coach of the Atlanta Thrashers.
- John Tortorella – former player who coached the team from 1986 to 1988, finishing both seasons with the best record in the league. After leaving the Lancers, he later coached the Rochester Americans of the American Hockey League and Tampa Bay Lightning, where he led his teams to their respective championships. He has also coached the New York Rangers, Vancouver Canucks and Columbus Blue Jackets of the National Hockey League.
