= Flint Spirits =

Ice hockey team

- City: Flint
- League: International Hockey League
- Operated: 1985–1990
- Home arena: IMA Sports Arena

Franchise history
- 1985–1990: Flint Spirits
- 1990–present: Fort Wayne Komets

The Flint Spirits logo used for the 1989-90 season, when they were an affiliate of the New York Rangers.

The Flint Spirits were a professional hockey team in Flint, Michigan from 1985 to 1990, and played their home games at the IMA Sports Arena. They were a part of the International Hockey League and replaced the recently departed Flint Generals team. They compiled an overall record of 162–220–28. Prior to the 1990–91 season, the original Fort Wayne Komets were moved to Albany, New York, and a group from Fort Wayne, Indiana, purchased the Spirits and relocated them to Fort Wayne in time to begin the season.

For the 1989-90 season, the Spirits were the top farm club of the New York Rangers.

== Season-by-season results ==
Year	GP	W	L	T	PTS	GF	GA	Pct	Standings	Playoffs
1985–86	82	16	66	0	38	271	497	.232	10th of 10	Out of playoffs
1986–87	82	42	33	7	91	343	361	.550	4th of 9	Lost Quarterfinals, 2–4 vs. Saginaw Generals
1987–88	82	42	31	9	93	395	389	.567	4th of 9	Won Quarterfinals, 4–2 vs. Muskegon Lumberjacks; Won Semifinals, 4–0 vs. Saginaw Hawks; Lost Turner Cup Finals, 2–4 vs. Salt Lake Golden Eagles
1988–89	82	22	54	6	50	287	428	.305	10th of 10	Out of playoffs
1989–90	82	40	36	6	86	326	345	.518	4th of 9	Lost Quarterfinals, 0-4 vs. Kalamazoo Wings
Totals	410	162	220	28	358	1622	2020	.437		

== Notable NHL alumni ==
The Flint Spirits sent numerous players to the NHL in their five years of existence. The biggest names include:

John Cullen, co-winner of the 1987–88 Gary F. Longman Memorial Trophy with Saginaw's Ed Belfour.
Ronnie Stern
Darcy Wakaluk
Rob Zamuner
Mike Richter
Paul Broten
Peter Laviolette
Jayson More
Kevin Miller
