= Atlantic Coast Hockey League =

American minor league hockey organization

- Sport: Ice hockey
- Founded: 1981
- Folded: 1987
- CEO: Ray Miron
- President: Bill Coffey
- Country: United States
- Last champion: Virginia Lancers
- Most titles: Carolina Thunderbirds (3)

The Atlantic Coast Hockey League (ACHL) was a minor league hockey organization that operated between 1981 and 1987. The league was founded by Bill Coffey. The Bob Payne Trophy was awarded to the team who won the league playoff championship.

According to a 1985 Montreal Gazette article, rookies were paid "$150 a week plus $35 for a victory" and veterans were paid "as much as $300 a week." League regulations also said that half the roster (eight out of fifteen players) must be rookie Americans.

== Formation ==
The ACHL's roots can be traced back to the former Eastern Hockey League (EHL) of the late 1970s and early 1980s. With a meeting of several EHL owners, the league decided to fold on July 19, 1981, and reorganize as the Atlantic Coast Hockey League. Teams and cities that were previous members of the Eastern Hockey League were interested in rejoining the league. Because the Mohawk Valley team being the most northern, the league was interested in inviting a sixth team to bridge the gap. Johnstown previously had an EHL team affiliated with the Red Wings and were the intended sixth team but due to the owner being ill, they were removed from the list. Richmond expressed interest, but due to questions about the financial stability of the league, they also dropped out. The Boston Bruins, along with several investors, were approached about putting a team in nearby Cape Cod. After an investor dropped out, Cape Cod Coliseum and WWF owner Vince McMahon purchased the rights to the franchise for $15,000.

== Inaugural season ==
The ACHL opened with seven teams:

- Salem Raiders
- Winston-Salem Thunderbirds
- Mohawk Valley Stars
- Baltimore Skipjacks
- Cape Cod Buccaneers
- Fitchburg Trappers
- Schenectady Chiefs.

From the opening night of the season, McMahon was not happy with how the league was run. Schenectady and Fitchburg were owned by the same person. Fitchburg was placed under a league suspension and would fold after 6 games. Schenectady would fold after 9 games. In January 1982, McMahon tried to borrow $15,000 from the league, citing "slow cash flow". When the league denied his loan, McMahon folded his franchise. With the league now down to 4 teams, the league decided to end the season early and set the playoffs by geographical area to save on expenses. Coincidentally, the matchups did end up having the first and fourth place teams meet, along with the second vs third place teams. The Salem Raiders defeated the Winston-Salem Thunderbirds, and the Mohawk Valley Stars defeated the Baltimore Skipjacks. The Raiders and Stars played in the league final, with the Mohawk Valley Stars defeating the Raiders for the Bob Payne Trophy.

In July 1982, Dave Schultz, a former National Hockey League player who spent the majority of his career with the Philadelphia Flyers during their Broad Street Bullies days, was appointed as the league's commissioner. He resigned from the position in February 1983.

On July 24, 1987, Commissioner Ray Miron announced that the league would be suspending operations for the 1987–88 season. The Troy Slapshots had folded earlier in the previous season, and the Mohawk Valley Comets in Utica, NY had been replaced with an American Hockey League team. This left the league with only three teams—Erie, Virginia, and Carolina—not enough for it to make sense to operate. Erie would cease operations, but the Lancers and Thunderbirds would transfer to the All-American Hockey League.

== ACHL to ECHL ==
Two teams from the current ECHL have roots tracing back to the Atlantic Coast Hockey League

Wheeling Nailers:

- 1981–82: Winston-Salem Thunderbirds (ACHL)
- 1982–87: Carolina Thunderbirds (ACHL)
- 1987–88: Carolina Thunderbirds (AAHL)
- 1988–89: Carolina Thunderbirds (ECHL)
- 1989–92: Winston-Salem Thunderbirds (ECHL)
- 1992–96: Wheeling Thunderbirds (ECHL)
- 1996–present: Wheeling Nailers (ECHL)

Trenton Ironhawks:

- 1981–1983: Nashville South Stars (CHL/ACHL)
- 1983–1990: Virginia Lancers (ACHL/AAHL/ECHL)
- 1990–1992: Roanoke Valley Rebels (ECHL)
- 1992–1993: Roanoke Valley Rampage (ECHL)
- 1993–1994: Huntsville Blast (ECHL)
- 1994–2001: Tallahassee Tiger Sharks (ECHL)
- 2001–2002: Macon Whoopee (ECHL)
- 2002–2003: Lexington Men O' War (ECHL)
- 2005–2026: Utah Grizzlies (ECHL)
- 2026–present: Trenton Ironhawks (ECHL)

== Teams ==
- Salem Raiders (1981–1982)
- Mohawk Valley Stars (1981–1985)
- Baltimore Skipjacks (1981–1982)
- Cape Cod Buccaneers (1981–1982)
- Winston-Salem/Carolina Thunderbirds (1981–82, 1982–87)
- Schenectady Chiefs (1981–1982)
- Fitchburg Trappers (1981–1982)
- Erie Golden Blades (1982–1987)
- Virginia Raiders (1982–1983)
- Hampton Roads Gulls (1982–1983)
- Nashville South Stars (1982–1983)
- Virginia Lancers (1983–1987)
- Pinebridge Bucks (1983–1985)
- Birmingham Bulls (1983–1984), folded after 3 games
- Mohawk Valley Comets (1985–1987)
- New York Slapshots (1985–1986)
- Troy Slapshots (1986–1987), folded after 6 games

=== Unnamed team ===
In December 1985, Recreational Ice of North Carolina (RINC) was granted an ACHL franchise. RINC general manager Bob Ohrablo had planned to put the franchise in Asheville, North Carolina. The team was to play in a newly built arena, the 3200-seat Asheville Ice Garden. The arena was to be completed in October 1986 and the team was supposed to start play during the 1986–87 season.

A name the team contest was to be held in February 1986, with the winner to be announced in March. It is unknown if a winner was ever announced.

== Awards ==
=== Bob Payne Trophy ===
The Bob Payne Trophy was awarded to the playoff champion at the end of each season. The trophy is named after Bob Payne, an executive with several teams in the Southern Hockey League and Eastern Hockey League. The trophy was loaned to the winning team for one year and was returned at the start of the following year's playoffs. The Carolina Thunderbirds were the only multiple winners of the trophy, having won it three of the six years, including back-to-back wins in 1984–85 and 1985–86.

- 1981–82: Mohawk Valley Stars
- 1982–83: Carolina Thunderbirds
- 1983–84: Erie Golden Blades
- 1984–85: Carolina Thunderbirds
- 1985–86: Carolina Thunderbirds
- 1986–87: Virginia Lancers

=== Regular season champions ===
- 1981–82: Salem Raiders
- 1982–83: Carolina Thunderbirds
- 1983–84: Carolina Thunderbirds
- 1984–85: Carolina Thunderbirds
- 1985–86: Carolina Thunderbirds
- 1986–87: Virginia Lancers

=== ACHL All-Stars ===
- 1981–82: Jim Stewart, G, Baltimore (1st team)
- 1982–83: Dave Watson, W, Carolina (1st team); Michel Lanouette, W, Carolina (1st team); Ron Carter, RW, Nashville/Virginia (2nd team); Brian Carroll, W, Carolina (2nd team); Randy Irving, D, Carolina (2nd team)
- 1983–84: Pierre Hamel, G, Carolina (1st team); Randy Irving, D, Carolina (1st team); Darrell May, G, Erie (2nd team); Paul O'Neil, C, Virginia (2nd team); Frank Perkins, Head Coach, Pinebridge (1st team); Barry Tabobondung, D/LW, Erie (2nd team)
- 1984–85: Ray LeBlanc, G, Pinebridge (1st team); Bob Hagan, Carolina (1st team); Randy Irving, D, Carolina (1st team); Paul Mancini, LW, Erie (1st team); Barry Tabobondung, D/LW, Erie (1st team)
- 1985–86: Ray LeBlanc, G, Carolina (1st team); Paul Mancini, LW, Erie (1st team); Jim Cowell, Erie (2nd team); John Hill, Virginia (2nd team); Randy Irving, D, Carolina (2nd team)
- 1986–87: Pete DeArmas, RW, Virginia (1st team); Jeff Eatough, RW, Mohawk Valley (2nd team)

=== ACHL MVP ===
- 1981–82: Dave MacQueen, Salem Raiders
- 1982–83: Rory Cava, Carolina Thunderbirds
- 1983–84: Paul O'Neil, Virginia Lancers
- 1984–85: Barry Tabobondung, Erie Golden Blades
- 1985–86: Joe Curran, Carolina Thunderbirds
- 1986–87: Pete DeArmas, Virginia Lancers

=== ACHL Playoff MVP ===
- 1984–85: Brian Carroll, Carolina Thunderbirds
- 1985–86: Bob Doré, Carolina Thunderbirds

=== ACHL Rookie Of The Year ===
- 1984–85: Todd Bjorkstrand, Pinebridge Bucks; Kurt Rugenius, Mohawk Valley Stars (tie)
- 1985–86: Bobby Williams, New York Slapshots
- 1986–87: Scott Knutson, Carolina Thunderbirds; Scott Curwin, Virginia Lancers

== Seasons ==
- 1981–82 ACHL season
- 1982–83 ACHL season
- 1983–84 ACHL season
- 1984–85 ACHL season
- 1985–86 ACHL season
- 1986–87 ACHL season

== See also ==
- List of ice hockey leagues
- Minor league
