= Mohawk Valley Comets (ACHL) =

- City: Utica, NY
- League: Atlantic Coast Hockey League
- Founded: 1985
- Operated: 1985-87
- Home arena: Utica Memorial Auditorium
- Colors: Red, White
- General manager: Joe Selenski (1986-87)
- Head coach: Bill Horton (1985-86); Joe Selenski (1986-87)

Franchise history
- 1981-85: Mohawk Valley Stars
- 1985-87: Mohawk Valley Comets

The Mohawk Valley Comets were a professional ice hockey team based in Utica, New York. They were a member of the Atlantic Coast Hockey League from 1985 until the league suspended operations until 1987.

== History ==
The Mohawk Valley Comets competed as the Mohawk Valley Stars in the Atlantic Coast Hockey League from 1981 to 1985. The Stars would win the inaugural Bob Payne Trophy, which was awarded to the ACHL playoff champions.

By the time the 1982-83 ACHL season started, all but two teams from the previous season either left the league or folded due to financial difficulty. The Winston-Salem Thunderbirds rebranded themselves as the Carolina Thunderbirds, leaving the Stars as the only "original" ACHL team. The Stars would struggle over the next few years, including a season of 14 wins in 1984-1985.

== 1986-87 season ==
The Comets started the season struggling, winning one game in their first nine. With the nearby Troy Slapshots failing to bring fans to the game (including one game that had an estimated 120 fans) and the inability for the team to pay several bills, the league decided to revoke the Slapshots' franchise on November 18, 1986. As a result, the league decided not have a dispersal draft for the league. Instead, they decided to give the Comets the rights to the former Slapshots players for ten days. Twelve players who had skated with the Slapshots saw ice time with the Comets throughout the season. The Comets also fired coach Bill Horton. In his place, the Comets hired Joe Selenski as their new coach and general manager. The Comets went 22-22-3 under Selenski and make the playoffs, and eventually lost to the Virginia Lancers four games to three in the Payne Trophy Finals.

== Transfer ==
After the 1986-87 season, the Mohawk Valley franchise announced that they would be leaving the ACHL to make room for an incoming American Hockey League franchise. The Maine Mariners AHL franchise would be relocated and named the Utica Devils the following season.

With the transfer of the Mohawk Valley market to the AHL and the announcements that the Carolina Thunderbirds and Virginia Lancers would be leaving for the newly formed All-American Hockey League, Commissioner Ray Miron announced that the league would be suspending operations indefinitely on July 25, 1987.
