= Erie Golden Blades =

- City: Erie, Pennsylvania
- League: ACHL
- Founded: 1982
- Folded: 1987
- Home arena: Erie County Field House (1982); Louis J. Tullio Arena (1983–87)
- Colors: yellow, blue, white
- Owner: Steve Stroul

Franchise history
- 1982 to 1987: Erie Golden Blades (ACHL)

Championships
- Playoff championships: 1984

The Erie Golden Blades were a minor league hockey team in Erie, Pennsylvania, which played in the Atlantic Coast Hockey League. The team's inaugural season was the Erie County Field House, which closed in 1983. The team relocated to Louis J. Tullio Arena in 1983, and played its home games for the remainder of the team's existence. The Golden Blades were owned by Steve Stroul from 1983–87 During the 82-83 season, the head trainer for the Blades was Marty Ward. Ward is a member of the Iroquois Nation (Onondaga) and went on to become the head trainer for the Iroquois Nationals lacrosse team from 2006-2014. Prior to training for the Blades, Ward trained for the Philadelphia Firebirds during the mid to late 70's and with the Syracuse Firebirds during their one season before they folded.

The Golden Blades played five seasons in the ACHL, reaching the playoffs each season. They would reach the final round of the playoffs in each of their first four seasons, winning the Bob Payne Trophy as league champion in 1983–84.

The Golden Blades would lose in the opening around of the 1986–87 ACHL playoffs. With several teams moving to the upstart All-American Hockey League, the Golden Blades (along with the league) folded.

== Notable personnel ==
- Ron Hansis: player-coach would later become the only coach of the Erie Panthers. Hansis also coached the Baton Rouge Kingfish after the Panthers moved from Erie to Baton Rouge before being replaced by Dave Schultz.
- Pierre Lagace: former draft pick of the Montreal Canadiens (round 3, 46th overall in 1977 NHL Entry Draft) and the Quebec Nordiques (round 8, 77th overall in the 1977 WHA amateur draft).
- Barry Tabobondung: former draft pick of the Philadelphia Flyers (round 3, 47th overall in the 1981 NHL Entry Draft). Would be named to the league's all star team in 1983–84 and 1984–85, and was named league MVP for the 1984–85 season.
- John Tortorella: played parts of two seasons (1982–83 and 1983–84) with the Golden Blades. In 1996 he became the Calder Cup winning head coach of the Rochester Americans, and in 2004 the Stanley Cup winning head coach with the Tampa Bay Lightning.
- Wayne Van Dorp: scored 54 points in 52 games with the Golden Blades. Would go on to play 128 games with the Edmonton Oilers, Pittsburgh Penguins, Chicago Blackhawks, and Quebec Nordiques of the National Hockey League.
