= ECHL Hall of Fame =

Hall of fame for the ECHL ice hockey league

The ECHL Hall of Fame is an ice hockey museum dedicated to honoring members who have played in the ECHL (formerly known as the East Coast Hockey League). It was created by the league in 2008. The ECHL Board of Governors created the ECHL Hall of Fame to recognize the achievements of players, coaches, and personnel who dedicated their careers to the league. Hall of Fame members are selected in four categories: Player, Developmental Player, Builder, and Referee/Linesman. Players must have concluded their career as an active player for a minimum of three playing seasons, though not continuous or full seasons. Developmental Players must have begun their career in the ECHL and went on to a distinguished career in the NHL, playing a minimum of 260 regular season games in the NHL, AHL and ECHL. Builders may be active or inactive whereas Referees and Linesmen must have concluded their active officiating career for a minimum of three playing seasons.

No more than five candidates are elected to the Hall of Fame each year with no more than three Players, one Developmental Player, two Builders and one Referee/Linesman. The Builder and the Referee/Linesman categories are dependent upon the number of candidates in the Player category.

The nomination and subsequent selection of candidates is determined by the ECHL Hall of Fame Selection Committee which is appointed by the ECHL.

The ECHL Hall of Fame inaugural class was inducted during the 2008 ECHL All-Star Game festivities at Stockton Arena in Stockton, California, and included ECHL founder Henry Brabham, the ECHL's first commissioner Patrick J. Kelly, and former players Nick Vitucci and Chris Valicevic.

== Hall of famers ==
Year	Name	Position or role	ECHL teams
2008	Henry Brabham	ECHL founder	League executive
2008	Patrick J. Kelly	Commissioner (1988–1996)	League executive
2008	Chris Valicevic	Defenseman	Greensboro Monarchs, Louisiana IceGators
2008	Nick Vitucci	Goaltender	Carolina / Winston-Salem Thunderbirds, Greensboro Monarchs, Hampton Roads Admirals, Toledo Storm, Charlotte Checkers, Greenville Grrrowl
2009	John Brophy	Head coach	Hampton Roads Admirals, Wheeling Nailers
2009	Blake Cullen	Owner	Hampton Roads Admirals
2009	Tom Nemeth	Defenseman	Dayton Bombers, South Carolina Stingrays, Toledo Storm
2009	Rod Taylor	Left winger	Hampton Roads Admirals, Richmond Renegades, Roanoke Express, South Carolina Stingrays, Peoria Rivermen, Toledo Storm
2010	Cam Brown	Left winger	Columbus Chill, Erie Panthers, Baton Rouge Kingfish, Gwinnett Gladiators
2010	E.A. "Bud" Gingher	Owner; chairman	Board of Governors Chairman (1992–95); Dayton Bombers owner
2010	Olaf Kolzig	Goaltender	Hampton Roads Admirals
2010	Darryl Noren	Center	Greensboro Monarchs, Charlotte Checkers
2011	Phil Berger	Right winger	Greensboro Monarchs, Charlotte Checkers, Raleigh IceCaps, Hampton Roads Admirals
2011	Richard Adams	President/CEO (1995–02)	League executive
2011	Luke Curtin	Left winger	Baton Rouge Kingfish, Atlantic City Boardwalk Bullies, Fresno Falcons
2011	Joe Ernst	Referee	League official
2012	Bob Woods	Defenseman	Johnstown Chiefs, Hampton Roads Admirals, Mobile Mysticks, Tallahassee Tiger Sharks, Mississippi Sea Wolves
2012	Bill Coffey	Founder	League executive
2012	Sheldon Gorski	Right winger	Louisville Icehawks, Louisville RiverFrogs, Miami Matadors, Pensacola Ice Pilots
2012	John Marks	Coach	Charlotte Checkers, Greenville Grrrowl, Pensacola Ice Pilots, Augusta Lynx
2012	Dave Seitz	Center	South Carolina Stingrays
2013	Dave Craievich	Defenseman	Cincinnati Cyclones, Birmingham Bulls, Mobile Mysticks
2013	Marc Magliarditi	Goaltender	Columbus Chill, Florida Everblades, Louisiana IceGators, Richmond Renegades, Las Vegas Wranglers
2013	Steve Poapst	Defenseman	Hampton Roads Admirals
2013	Darren Schwartz	Left winger	Johnstown Chiefs, Winston-Salem Thunderbirds, Tallahassee Tiger Sharks, Wheeling Thunderbirds/Nailers
2014	James Edwards	President; chairman	Johnstown Chiefs president, Chairman of the ECHL Board of Governors (1999–2003)
2014	Wes Goldie	Right winger	Pee Dee Pride, Victoria Salmon Kings, and Alaska Aces
2014	Al MacIsaac	Defense; GM/coach	Hampton Roads Admirals
2014	John Spoltore	Center	Louisiana IceGators
2015	Darren Colbourne	Right winger	Dayton Bombers, Richmond Renegades, Raleigh IceCaps, Augusta Lynx
2015	Louis Dumont	Center	Tallahassee Tiger Sharks, Wheeling Thunderbirds, Louisiana IceGators, Augusta Lynx, Pensacola Ice Pilots, Mississippi Sea Wolves, and Utah Grizzlies
2015	Scott Sabatino	Executive vice president; COO	League executive
2015	Carl Scheer	Owner; chairman	Charlotte Checkers owner, Chairman of the ECHL Board of Governors, Greenville Grrrowl owner
2016	Daniel Berthiaume	Goaltender	Wheeling Thunderbirds, Roanoke Express and Greensboro Generals
2016	Craig Brush	General manager	Florida Everblades
2016	Allan Sirois	Left winger	Baton Rouge Kingfish, Jacksonville Lizard Kings, Pee Dee Pride, Greenville Grrrowl, Texas Wildcatters
2017	T. Paul Hendrick	ECHL general counsel	League executive
2017	Rick Kowalsky	Right winger; head coach	As player: Hampton Roads Admirals, Trenton Titans, Roanoke Express; as head coach: Trenton Titans/Devils
2017	Brad Phillips	Linesman	League official
2018	Steve Chapman	General manager; chairman	League executive; Chairman of the ECHL Board of Governors (2006–2015); president and general manager of Mobile Mysticks (1995–2001) and Gwinnett Gladiators (2002–2015); assistant general manager of Birmingham Bulls (1992–1995)
2018	Sam Ftorek	Defenseman	Augusta Lynx, Mobile Mysticks, Greensboro Generals, Gwinnett Gladiators, Fresno Falcons, Cincinnati Cyclones, Kalamazoo Wings
2018	Jason Saal	Goaltender	South Carolina Stingrays, Peoria Rivermen, Hampton Roads Admirals, Dayton Bombers, Louisiana IceGators, Arkansas RiverBlades, Augusta Lynx
2019	Jim Bermingham	Center	Toledo Storm, Wheeling Thunderbirds, Huntington Blizzard, Jackson Bandits, Pensacola Ice Pilots
2019	Alex Hicks	Left winger	Toledo Storm
2019	Rick Judson	Left winger	Toledo Storm, Greenville Grrrowl
2019	Brian McKenna	Commissioner (2002–2018); general manager	League executive; general manager of the Trenton Titans
2020	Jared Bednar	Defenseman; coach	As player: Huntington Blizzard, South Carolina Stingrays; as coach: South Carolina Stingrays (assistant from 2002 to 2007, head coach from 2007 to 2009)
2020	Dany Bousquet	Left winger	Hampton Roads Admirals, Birmingham Bulls, Pee Dee Pride
2020	Derek Clancey	Center; coach	As player: Erie Panthers, Toledo Storm, Winston-Salem Thunderbirds, Columbus Chill, Chesapeake Icebreakers; as coach: Chesapeake Icebreakers, Jackson Bandits, Reading Royals, Dayton Bombers
2020	Glen Metropolit	Center	Nashville Knights, Pensacola Ice Pilots
2022	Ray Harris	Owner	Cincinnati Cyclones
2022	Brett Marietti	Player	South Carolina Stingrays
2022	Joel Martin	Goaltender	Columbus Cottonmouths, Trenton Titans, Elmira Jackals, Augusta Lynx
2022	Tim Novak	Official	ECHL
2023	Mark Bernard	Goaltender	Hampton Roads Admirals
2023	Scott Bertoli	Player	Trenton Titans
2023	Victor Gervais	Player	Hampton Roads Admirals, Florence Pride
2023	Dana Heinze	Equipment manager	Johnstown Chiefs
2024	Scott Burfoot	Center	Erie Panthers, Roanoke Valley Rampage, Huntsville Blast, Richmond Renegades
2024	Brad Dexter	Defenseman	Raleigh IceCaps, South Carolina Stingrays, Pensacola Ice Pilots, Victoria Salmon Kings
2024	Jason Fitzsimmons	Goalie/Coach	South Carolina Stingrays, Columbus Chill (player); South Carolina Stingrays (coach)
2024	June Kelly	ECHL	League executive
2024	Shawn Wheeler	Left wing	Greensboro Monarchs, Hampton Roads Admirals, Charlotte Checkers
2025	Alex Burrows	Left winger	Greenville Grrrowl
2025	Dave Gagnon	Goaltender	Hampton Roads Admirals, Toledo Storm and Roanoke Valley Rampage
2025	Glen Thornborough	League officer	
2025	Jamey Hicks	Center; head coach; director	Birmingham Bulls and Arkansas River Blades
2026	Jeff Campbell	Right wing	Gwinnett Gladiators
2026	Jason Christie	Right wing; coach	As player: Columbus Chill, Charlotte Checkers, Peoria Rivermen; As coach: Peoria Rivermen, Utah Grizzlies, Ontario Reign, Tulsa Oilers, Jacksonville Icemen
2026	Riley Gill	Goaltender	Kalamazoo Wings, Victoria Salmon Kings, Reading Royals, Allen Americans
2026	Mark Turner	Center	Columbus Chill, New Orleans Brass, Mobile Mysticks, Greensboro Generals, Toledo Storm

== Inductees by team ==
- 16: Hampton Roads Admirals (includes one owner and two coaches)
- 9: League executives, Toledo Storm
- 8 South Carolina Stingrays (includes two inductees who have both played and coached for team)
- 7: Charlotte Checkers (includes one owner and one coach)
- 6: Mobile Mysticks (includes one manager),Pensacola Ice Pilots (includes one coach)
- 5: Augusta Lynx, Columbus Chill, Dayton Bombers (includes one owner and one coach), Greensboro Monarchs, Louisiana IceGators, Greenville Grrrowl (includes owner and one coach), Johnstown Chiefs (including one president), Richmond Renegades, Trenton Titans/Devils (includes one player/coach and manager), Wheeling Nailers/Thunderbirds (includes one coach)
- 4: Birmingham Bulls (including one manager and one player who became a coach), Gwinnett Gladiators (including one manager)
- 3: Erie Panthers, Peoria Rivermen, Raleigh Icecaps, Tallahassee Tiger Sharks, Victoria Salmon Kings, Winston-Salem Thunderbirds
- 2: Baton Rouge Kingfish, Cincinnati Cyclones, Fresno Falcons, Greensboro Generals, Huntington Blizzard, Jackson Bandits (includes one coach), Kalamazoo Wings, Mississippi Sea Wolves, Pee Dee Pride, Reading Royals (including one coach), Roanoke Express, Arkansas RiverBlades, Roanoke Valley Rampage, Utah Grizzlies (including one manager)
- 1: Alaska Aces, Allen Americans, Atlantic City Boardwalk Bullies, Chesapeake Icebreakers, Florence Pride, Huntsville Blast, Jacksonville Icemen (coach), Jacksonville Lizard Kings, Las Vegas Wranglers, Louisville Icehawks, Louisville RiverFrogs, Miami Matadors, New Orleans Brass, Ontario Reign (coach), Tulsa Oilers (coach)

== See also ==
- Hockey Hall of Fame
- AHL Hall of Fame
