= List of defunct ECHL teams =

This is a list of teams that once played in the ECHL but no longer exist. This includes franchises which have relocated to different cities. The years of operation only reflect the time in which the team was in the ECHL; it does not take into account any time in which the franchise operated in another league (such as the Central Hockey League, International Hockey League, United Hockey League or West Coast Hockey League).

== Defunct and relocated teams prior to the ECHL's absorption of the WCHL ==
Team	Seasons	Outcome
Carolina/Winston-Salem Thunderbirds	1988–1992	Moved to Wheeling, West Virginia.
Cincinnati Cyclones	1990–1992	Moved to Birmingham, Alabama, and replaced by the Cincinnati Cyclones of the IHL.
Virginia Lancers; Roanoke Valley Rebels; Roanoke Valley Rampage	1988–1993	Moved to Huntsville, Alabama.
Louisville Icehawks	1990–1994	Moved to Jacksonville, Florida.
Huntsville Blast	1993–1994	Moved to Tallahassee, Florida.
Greensboro Monarchs	1989–1995	Ceased operations and replaced by the Carolina Monarchs of the AHL.
Erie Panthers	1988–1996	Moved to Baton Rouge, Louisiana
Nashville Knights	1989–1996	Moved to Pensacola, Florida, and replaced by the Nashville Predators of the NHL.
Knoxville Cherokees	1988–1997	Moved to Florence, South Carolina.
Raleigh IceCaps	1991–1998	Moved to Augusta, Georgia, and replaced by the Carolina Hurricanes of the NHL.
Louisville RiverFrogs	1995–1998	Moved to Miami, Florida.
Columbus Chill	1991–1999	Moved to Reading, Pennsylvania, and replaced by the Columbus Blue Jackets of the NHL.
Chesapeake Icebreakers	1997–1999	Moved to Jackson, Mississippi.
Miami Matadors	1998–1999	Moved to Cincinnati, Ohio.
Hampton Roads Admirals	1989–2000	Ceased operations and replaced by the Norfolk Admirals of the AHL. The franchise was purchased in 2001 and became the Columbus Cottonmouths. A new ECHL Admirals team returned in 2015.
Huntington Blizzard	1993–2000	Moved to Beaumont, Texas.
Jacksonville Lizard Kings	1995–2000	Ceased operations.
Tallahassee Tiger Sharks	1994–2001	Moved to Macon, Georgia.
Birmingham Bulls	1992–2001	Moved to Atlantic City, New Jersey.
Mobile Mysticks	1995–2002	Moved to Duluth, Georgia.
New Orleans Brass	1997–2002	Ceased operations.
Macon Whoopee	2001–2002	Moved to Lexington, Kentucky.
Richmond Renegades	1990–2003	Ceased operations and replaced by the Richmond RiverDogs of the United Hockey League from 2003 to 2006. Another Renegades team then joined the Southern Professional Hockey League in 2006.
Baton Rouge Kingfish	1996–2003	Moved to Victoria, British Columbia.
Arkansas RiverBlades	1999–2003	Ceased operations.
Jackson Bandits	1999–2003	Ceased operations.
Lexington Men O' War	2002–2003	Moved to West Valley City, Utah

== Defunct and relocated teams after the ECHL's absorption of the WCHL ==
Team	Seasons	Outcome
Roanoke Express	1993–2004	Franchise rights revoked by the ECHL.
Greensboro Generals	1999–2004	Franchise rights revoked by the ECHL.
Columbus Cottonmouths	2001–2004	Ceased operations and replaced by the Columbus Cottonmouths of the Southern Professional Hockey League (SPHL).
Louisiana IceGators	1995–2005	Franchise rights revoked by the ECHL.
Peoria Rivermen	1996–2005	Ceased operations and replaced by the Peoria Rivermen of the AHL.
Pee Dee Pride	1996–2005	Returned franchise rights to the ECHL after a failed attempt to move to Myrtle Beach, South Carolina, between 2005 and 2008.
Atlantic City Boardwalk Bullies	2001–2005	Moved to Stockton, California.
Greenville Grrrowl	1998–2006	Franchise revoked by the ECHL.
San Diego Gulls	2003–2006	Franchise revoked by the ECHL.
Long Beach Ice Dogs	2003–2007	Franchise revoked by the ECHL.
Toledo Storm	2003–2007	Suspended operations after the 2006–07 ECHL season. Returned in 2009 as the Toledo Walleye.
Pensacola Ice Pilots	1996–2008	Franchise revoked by the ECHL. Replaced by the Pensacola Ice Flyers of the SPHL.
Columbia Inferno	2001–2008	Ceased operations following the 2007–08 ECHL season.
Texas Wildcatters	2003–2008	Moved to Ontario, California.
Augusta Lynx	1998–2008	Ceased operations on December 2, 2008, becoming the first team to fold during the season.
Fresno Falcons	2003–2008	Ceased operations on December 22, 2008, becoming the second team to fold during the season.
Dayton Bombers	1991–2009	Relinquished membership to the ECHL following a failed drive for season tickets and managing partnership to resume play for the 2010–11 season. Replaced by the Dayton Gems of the International Hockey League.
Mississippi Sea Wolves	1996–2009	Ceased operations and replaced by the Mississippi Surge of the SPHL.
Phoenix RoadRunners	2005–2009	Ceased operations.
Johnstown Chiefs	1988–2010	Moved to Greenville, South Carolina. Last remaining member of the five founding teams of the East Coast Hockey League to relocate.
Charlotte Checkers	1993–2010	Ceased operations and replaced by the Charlotte Checkers of the AHL.
Victoria Salmon Kings	2004–2011	Ceased operations following the 2010–11 ECHL season. Concluded a franchise history that began with the Erie Panthers, one of the ECHL's charter teams. Replaced in market by the WHL's Victoria Royals.
Chicago Express	2011–2012	Ceased operations following the 2011–12 ECHL season.
Trenton Titans/Devils	1999–2013	Ceased operations following the 2012–13 ECHL season.
San Francisco Bulls	2012–2014	Ceased operations on January 27, 2014, becoming the third team to fold during the season.
Las Vegas Wranglers	2003–2014	Relinquished membership to the ECHL following failure to find another suitable arena to resume play for the 2015–16 season.

== Defunct and relocated teams after the ECHL's absorption of the CHL ==
Team	Seasons	Outcome
Bakersfield Condors	2003–2015	Moved to Norfolk, Virginia, and replaced by the Bakersfield Condors of the AHL.
Ontario Reign	2008–2015	Moved to Manchester, New Hampshire, and replaced by the Ontario Reign of the AHL.
Stockton Thunder	2005–2015	Moved to Glens Falls, New York, and replaced by the Stockton Heat of the AHL.
Evansville IceMen	2012–2016	Suspended operations following the 2015–16 ECHL season. Relocated to Jacksonville, Florida, after a one-year hiatus as the Jacksonville Icemen. Replaced by the Evansville Thunderbolts of the SPHL.
Alaska Aces	2003–2017	Ceased operations due to Alaskan economy, increased travel expenses, and decreased ticket sales. Franchise was sold and relocated to Portland, Maine.
Elmira Jackals	2007–2017	Ceased operations due to no ownership. The team and the arena had been operated by the county and when the county finally had an agreement to sell the arena, the Jackals folded when the potential new owner did not want to operate the team. The sale fell through and a new potential owner of the arena also bought a franchise in the Federal Hockey League for the 2018–19 season called the Elmira Enforcers.
Colorado Eagles	2011–2018	Organization obtained an expansion franchise in the American Hockey League for the 2018–19 season.
Quad City Mallards	2014–2018	Ceased operations due to financial losses. First former Central Hockey League (CHL) franchise that was added from the 2014 merger to cease operations. Replaced by the Quad City Storm of the SPHL.
Manchester Monarchs	2015–2019	Folded after failing to find new ownership.
Brampton Beast	2014–2020	Ceased operations due to financial losses and not being able to play during the COVID-19 pandemic. Second former CHL franchise from the 2014 merger to cease operations.
Newfoundland Growlers	2018–2024	Ceased operations on April 2, 2024 due to failure to fulfill obligations under ECHL bylaws, becoming the fourth team to fold during the season.
Utah Grizzlies	2005–2026	Moved to Trenton, New Jersey.
