= Nick Vitucci =

Canadian ice hockey player and coach

- Born: June 16, 1967 (age 59) Welland, Ontario, Canada
- Height: 5 ft 9 in (175 cm)
- Weight: 175 lb (79 kg; 12 st 7 lb)
- Position: Goaltender
- Caught: Left
- Played for: Maine Mariners; Hershey Bears; Peoria Rivermen; Binghamton Rangers
- NHL draft: Undrafted
- Playing career: 1988–2001

Nick Vitucci (born June 16, 1967) is a former professional ice hockey goaltender. He was the head coach of the ECHL's Toledo Walleye from 2009 to 2014. In 2008, Vitucci was inducted into the ECHL Hall of Fame.

== Playing career ==
Vitucci began his professional playing career with the Carolina Thunderbirds of the ECHL, and was invited to sign with the team by head coach Joe Selenski, who had been impressed by the goaltender's play at the Johnstown Chiefs training camp the prior season. During his playing career, Vitucci spent most of his time in the ECHL, but had numerous call ups including stints in the IHL with the Peoria Rivermen and in the AHL with the Maine Mariners, Hershey Bears, and Binghamton Rangers. Vitucci also spent several summers in the RHI, with the Buffalo Stampede, Empire State Cobras, Buffalo Wings, and the New Jersey Rockin' Rollers. During his career in the ECHL, Vitucci won four Riley Cups in 1989, 1990, 1994 and 1996 and was named the Finals Most Valuable Player on two occasions (1989 and 1996), one of only two players in the league's history to do so, and Goaltender of the Year in 1998. Vitucci spent at least some time in all of his 13 years of professional hockey in the ECHL and when he retired in 2001 Vitucci left as the league's career record holder in games played, minutes played, wins, most 20 win seasons, most 30 win seasons, and most losses.

Vitucci is the only goaltender in the history of professional hockey to be credited with a goal against a guarded net. In the 1996 season, while playing for the Charlotte Checkers, Vitucci shot the puck up the ice toward opposing goaltender Alain Morissette of the Louisville RiverFrogs. Morissette stopped the puck outside the goal, but spun and shot it into his own net while attempting a pass. As the most recent Checkers player to touch the puck, Vitucci was awarded a point scored against an opposing goalie—a unique feat in hockey history for any goaltender.

In 2008, Vitucci was inducted into the ECHL Hall of Fame. Vitucci was joined by ECHL founder Henry Brabham, the league's first commissioner Patrick J. Kelly, and defenceman Chris Valicevic as members of the Hall of Fame's inaugural class.

== Career statistics ==
Season	Team	League	GP	W	L	T	MIN	GA	SO	GAA	SV%
1985–86	Toronto Marlboros	OHL	20	–	–	–	1203	108	0	5.39	–
1986–87	Toronto Marlboros	OHL	40	–	–	–	2456	213	0	5.20	–
1988–89	Carolina Thunderbirds	ECHL	22	11	9	0	1238	96	1	4.65	.873
1989–90	Winston-Salem Thunderbirds	ECHL	6	4	2	0	360	28	0	4.67	.856
1989–90	Greensboro Monarchs	ECHL	28	10	9	5	1496	114	0	4.57	.891
1990–91	Greensboro Monarchs	ECHL	41	22	16	2	2225	142	1	3.83	.898
1991–92	Greensboro Monarchs	ECHL	42	28	8	2	2358	136	0	3.46	.903
1991–92	Maine Mariners	AHL	1	0	0	1	65	3	0	2.77	.880
1991–92	Hershey Bears	AHL	4	2	1	0	191	15	0	4.71	.848
1992–93	Hampton Roads Admirals	ECHL	29	17	7	3	1669	85	1	3.06	.911
1992–93	Peoria Rivermen	IHL	8	3	4	1	279	27	0	3.38	.895
1993–94	Toledo Storm	ECHL	27	15	6	4	1532	93	0	3.64	.892
1993–94	Peoria Rivermen	IHL	11	3	4	1	422	35	0	4.98	.850
1994–95	Toledo Storm	ECHL	56	35	16	3	3273	176	3	3.23	.906
1995–96	Charlotte Checkers	ECHL	48	32	13	3	2793	164	0	3.52	.891
1996–97	Charlotte Checkers	ECHL	36	20	10	4	2028	117	0	3.46	.902
1996–97	Binghamton Rangers	AHL	2	0	0	2	129	9	0	4.18	.875
1997–98	Toledo Storm	ECHL	49	27	16	5	2826	130	2	2.76	.918
1998–99	Greenville Grrrowl	ECHL	32	9	17	4	1855	103	0	3.33	.896
1999–00	Greenville Grrrowl	ECHL	34	21	9	2	1916	79	1	2.47	.915
2000–01	Greenville Grrrowl	ECHL	29	14	12	2	1719	91	1	3.18	.895
AHL totals			6	2	1	3	385	27	0	4.21	–
IHL totals			19	6	8	2	701	62	0	5.31	–
ECHL totals			479	265	150	41	27288	1554	10	3.42	–
OHL totals			60	–	–	–	3659	321	0	5.26	–

== Coaching career ==
Vitucci began his career as a coach during the 1994–95 season when he took up assistant coaching duties while playing for the Toledo Storm. Vitucci would have a second stint as a player/assistant coach during his final year as a player with the Greenville Grrrowl.

In 2002, Vitucci returned to Greenville to be their assistant coach and would leave to fill the assistant coach vacancy in Toledo after the season. Two months into the 2003–04 season, Toledo Storm head coach Steve Harrison was fired and Vitucci, who was his assistant at the time, was tabbed to be the interim head coach for the remainder of the season. At the end of the season, the Storm signed Vitucci to be their permanent replacement for Harrison and has remained the team's coach through the team suspending operations in 2007 in order to construct the new arena.

In February 2008 it was announced he would be retained as the head coach for the Walleye, which will be his fifth season in Toledo. The Storm saw success under Vitucci's tenure as the team made the playoffs in all three years with Vitucci, including a division title in 2006 and reaching the American Conference Finals in the same year. Vitucci would go on to coach the team through the middle of 2014, where he then stepped down to focus on his role as the Director of Hockey Operations. In February 2016, Vitucci left the Walleye organization and returned to the bench as an assistant coach for the Portland Pirates. Since the start of the 2016/2017 season, Vitucci has been a professional scout for the New Jersey Devils.

== Coaching record ==
Team	Year	Regular season						Postseason			
Team	Year	G	W	L	T	Pts	Finish	W	L	Win %	Result
Toledo Storm
Toledo Storm	2003–04	49	14	27	8	36	7th in Northern	–	–	–	Missed playoffs
Toledo Storm	2004–05	72	41	26	5	87	4th in North	1	3	.200	Lost in Division Semifinals
Toledo Storm	2005–06	72	46	21	5	97	1st in North	7	6	.539	Lost in Conference Finals
Toledo Storm	2006–07	72	39	30	3	81	2nd in North	0	3	.000	Lost in Division Semifinals
Toledo Walleye	2009–10	72	35	30	7	77	3rd in North	1	3	.250	Lost in Conference Quarterfinals
Total		335	175	132	28	.564		9	15	.375	
