= ECHL All-Star Game =

Ice hockey league all star game

The ECHL All-Star Game is an exhibition ice hockey game that traditionally marks the midway point of the ECHL's regular season, with many of the league's star players playing against each other. The starting lineup for the teams, including the starting goaltender, is voted on by the coaches, players, and other league representatives. The coaches for the All-Star Game teams are typically the head coaches of the teams that, at the time of the All-Star Game roster announcements, are leading their respective conferences in point percentage (i.e. fraction of points obtained out of total possible points). The All-Star Game festivities also includes an ECHL All-Star Skills Competition, a competition showing the various talents of the all-stars.

In August 2011, the ECHL Board of Governors announced its intent not to hold an All-Star Game for the 2011–12 season, citing a desire to explore other options in preparation for celebrating the league's 25th anniversary during the 2012–13 season. This marked the first season since the All-Star Game's inception in 1993 that one was not held. Since then, the ECHL also did not schedule an All-Star game in 2014, 2016 and 2025. The 2021 event was cancelled due to the COVID-19 pandemic, with 2021 host Jacksonville hosting the 2022 event.

As of 2018, the ECHL has adopted a four-team, 3-on-3 player format and began calling the event the All-Star Classic. In 2020, the All-Star Game added players from the Professional Women's Hockey Player Association with Dani Cameranesi, Kali Flanagan, Gigi Marvin, and Annie Pankowski each being assigned to one of the four teams.

== All-Star Game results ==
Year	Winner	Score	Loser	MVP	Host	Host arena	Attendance
1993	East All-Stars	7–3	West All-Stars	Darren Schwartz, Wheeling (East)	Wheeling Thunderbirds	Wheeling Civic Center	4,854
1994	West All-Stars	7–6	East All-Stars	Joe Cook, Columbus (West); Cory Cadden, Knoxville (West)	Hampton Roads Admirals	Norfolk Scope	6,361
1995	West All-Stars	6–5	East All-Stars	Jay Neal, Toledo (West)	Greensboro Monarchs	Greensboro Coliseum	5,662
1996	Northern Conference	10–7	Southern Conference	Don Parsons, Johnstown (North)	Tallahassee Tiger Sharks	Tallahassee-Leon County Civic Center	5,576
1997	Charlotte Checkers	7–6	ECHL All-Stars	Andrei Bashkirov, Huntington (ECHL); David Brosseau, Charlotte	Charlotte Checkers	Independence Arena	7,087
1998	Canada All-Stars	11–7	USA/World All-Stars	Thomas Braun, Jacksonville (Canada)	Louisiana IceGators	Cajundome	11,493
1999	Southern Conference	7–4	Northern Conference	Jason Elders, Mobile (South)	Mississippi Sea Wolves	Mississippi Coast Coliseum	7,566
2000	Northern Conference	8–6	Southern Conference	Jeff Mitchell, Dayton (North)	Greenville Grrrowl	BI-LO Center	9,444
2001	Southern Conference	9–5	Northern Conference	Jonas Soling, Augusta (South)	Arkansas RiverBlades	ALLTEL Arena	7,029
2002	Southern Conference	7–6	Northern Conference	Allan Sirois, Augusta (South)	Trenton Titans	Sovereign Bank Arena	7,165
2003	Northern Conference	8–2	Southern Conference	Scott Stirling, Atlantic City (North)	Florida Everblades	Germain Arena	6,442
2004	Eastern Conference	7–6	Western Conference	Randy Rowe, Peoria (East)	Peoria Rivermen	Carver Arena	7,242
2005	National Conference	6–2	American Conference	Frank Doyle, Idaho (National)	Reading Royals	Sovereign Center	6,746
2006	National Conference	7–6	American Conference	Luke Curtin, Fresno (National)	Fresno Falcons	Save Mart Center	7,667
2007	American Conference	6–3	National Conference	Adam Berkhoel, Dayton (American)	Idaho Steelheads	Qwest Arena	4,371
2008	National Conference	10–7	American Conference	Ash Goldie, Victoria (National)	Stockton Thunder	Stockton Arena	7,455
2009	American Conference	11–5	National Conference	Matt Ford, Charlotte (American)	Reading Royals	Sovereign Center	5,693
2010	National Conference	10–9	American Conference	Evan Barlow, Idaho (National)	Ontario Reign	Citizens Business Bank Arena	7,615
2011	ECHL All Stars	9–3	Bakersfield Condors	Mark Arcobello, Stockton (ECHL All Stars)	Bakersfield Condors	Rabobank Arena	7,397
2012	No All-Star Game scheduled						
2013	ECHL All Stars	7–3	Colorado Eagles	Ryan Zapolski, South Carolina (ECHL All Stars)	Colorado Eagles	Budweiser Events Center	5,289
2014	No All-Star Game scheduled						
2015	ECHL All Stars	8–4	Orlando Solar Bears	Myles Bell, Evansville (ECHL All Stars)	Orlando Solar Bears	Amway Center	9,288
2016	No All-Star Game scheduled						
2017	ECHL All Stars	8–7	Adirondack Thunder	Matt Garbowsky, Colorado (ECHL All Stars)	Adirondack Thunder	Glens Falls Civic Center	3,767
2018	Mountain Division	6–5 (SO)	South Division	Taylor Cammarata, South Carolina (South Div.)	Indy Fuel	Indiana Farmers Coliseum	4,795
2019	Eastern Conference	2–1 (SO)	Team Fins	David Pacan, Brampton (Eastern Conf.)	Toledo Walleye	Huntington Center	7,736
2020	Eastern Conference	4–2	Western Conference	Logan Roe, Florida (Eastern Conf.)	Wichita Thunder	Intrust Bank Arena	5,572
2021	ECHL All-Star Game not held due to COVID-19 pandemic, 2021 host awarded the 2022 event				~~Jacksonville Icemen~~	~~VyStar Veterans Memorial Arena~~	
2022	ECHL All-Stars	14–7	Jacksonville Icemen	Marcus Crawford, Kansas City (All-Stars)	Jacksonville Icemen	VyStar Veterans Memorial Arena	7,687
2023	Destroyers	2-0	Norfolk Admirals		Norfolk Admirals	Norfolk Scope	5,067
2024	ECHL All-Stars	18-11	Savannah Ghost Pirates		Savannah Ghost Pirates	Enmarket Arena	6,795
2025	No All-Star Game scheduled (replaced by 2025 Heritage Classic, Toledo at Kalamazoo, January 18, 2025)						
2026	Stripes	17-12	Stars	Brannon McManus, Adirondack, Stripes	Allen Americans	Credit Union of Texas Event Center	4,890

== See also ==
- List of ECHL seasons
