= Darren Schwartz =

Canadian ice hockey player (born 1968)

- Born: March 28, 1968 (age 58) Kamsack, Saskatchewan, Canada
- Height: 5 ft 11 in (180 cm)
- Weight: 210 lb (95 kg; 15 st 0 lb)
- Position: Left wing
- Shot: Left
- Played for: Baltimore Skipjacks; Denver Grizzlies; Johnstown Chiefs; Nottingham Panthers; Tallahassee Tiger Sharks; Wheeling Nailers; Wheeling Thunderbirds; Winston-Salem IceHawks; Winston-Salem Thunderbirds
- NHL draft: undrafted
- Playing career: 1989–1999

Darren Schwartz (born March 28, 1968) is a Canadian former professional ice hockey player who played 490 games in the East Coast Hockey League. He was inducted into the ECHL Hall of Fame on January 23, 2013.

== Career ==
Schwartz's career spanned ten years, nine of which were in the East Coast Hockey League (now ECHL). He entered the league with the Johnstown Chiefs, scoring 120 points and accumulating 524 PIM from 1989 until 1991. He joined the Winston-Salem Thunderbirds in 1991 and led the team with 345 PIM, which was also the second highest total in the league.

Schwartz remained with the Thunderbirds as the franchise transferred from Winston-Salem to Wheeling and scored a career-high 62 goals in 62 games. Schwartz's 62 goals set a team record (which remains unbroken as of the completion of the 2012–13 ECHL season) and was second in the league to Trevor Jobe's ECHL record-setting 85 goals. Both Schwartz and Jobe are two of eight players in ECHL history that have broken the 60 goal barrier. Along with setting a career-high with 114 points, Schwartz was named to the All-ECHL First Team for the first time in his career. Schwartz also set several ECHL records during the season. He scored the fastest hat trick in ECHL history, scoring three goals on December 20, 1992, against the Roanoke Valley Rampage. Schwartz scored his goals at the 17:51, twelve seconds later at 18:03, and completed the hat trick eighteen seconds later at 18:21 of the third period. He also set a consecutive games with a goal scored record, scoring 25 goals in 16 games, spanning from January 14, 1993, until February 21, 1993. Schwartz also tied Jobe's league-leading mark with ten game-winning goals during the 1992–93 season.

Schwartz returned to the Thunderbirds for a third season in 1993, scoring 92 points in 67 games. He was named to All-ECHL First Team for a second time.

Schwartz joined the Tallahassee Tiger Sharks for the 1994–95 ECHL season, leading the team with 47 goals and 82 points. Schwartz was also named to the ECHL All-Star Game for a third consecutive season. During this game, Schwartz set an ECHL record by scoring his sixth career All-Star Game goal (including a hat trick in a span of 8:28 from the start of the game) and accumulating his ninth career All-Star Game point. Schwartz and the Tiger Sharks reached the Riley Cup semi-final, but lost to eventual champion Richmond Renegades three games to two. He returned to the Tiger Sharks for a second season, scoring 61 points in 20 games.

After seven seasons in the ECHL, Schwartz returned to the Winston-Salem area, joining the Winston-Salem IceHawks of the United Hockey League. Despite leading the team in goals (42), assists (35), and points (77), the IceHawks did not make the playoffs.

Schwartz returned to the ECHL and Wheeling for the 1998–99 ECHL season as a member of the Wheeling Nailers. Once again, Schwartz led his team in goals (27), assists (29), and points (56).

== Retirement ==
Schwartz retired at the end of the 1998–99 season at age 30. At the time of his retirement, Schwartz held the ECHL career record with 490 games played. and remains the Nailers all-time leading scorer. Despite being retired for over a decade, Schwartz's 313 goals (7th all-time), 571 points (13th all-time), and 1739 PIM (8th all-time) remain some of the highest career numbers in ECHL history.

Schwartz, along with Wheeling Amateur Hockey Association founder Bob Otten, were both inducted into the Wheeling Hockey Hall Of Fame during a pregame ceremony on November 26, 2008, vs the Elmira Jackals. The first 2500 fans through the gate received limited edition Darren Schwartz bobbleheads. Schwartz was a part of the group that was inducted into the ECHL Hall of Fame on January 23, 2013, in Loveland, Colorado

== Records ==
=== ECHL ===
- 1989–99: Games played, career (490) (ECHL record, since broken by several players)
- 1992–93: Quickest hat trick (December 20, 1992)
- 1992–93: Consecutive games with a goal scored (16) (January 14, 1993 - February 21, 1993)
- 1992–93: Most game-winning goals (season) (10, tied with Trevor Jobe)
- 1992–93: Points scored, postseason (31)
- 1993–95: Most goals, ECHL All-Star Game (career) (6)
- 1993–95: Most points, ECHL All-Star Game (career) (9)
- 1994–95: Fastest two goals, one player, start of game, ECHL All-Star Game (5 minutes, 52 seconds)
- 1994–95: Fastest hat trick, one player, ECHL All-Star Game (8 minutes, 28 seconds)

=== Wheeling Thunderbirds/Nailers ===
- 1991–99: Goals scored, career (166)
- 1992–93: Goals scored, single season (62)

== Awards and accomplishments ==
- 1992–93: ECHL All-Star Game MVP
- 1992–93: All-ECHL First Team (left wing)
- 1993–94: All-ECHL First Team (left wing)
- 1994–95: All-ECHL First Team (left wing)
- 2002–03: ECHL 15th Anniversary Team (left wing, 2nd team)
- 2008–09: Inducted into the Wheeling Hockey Hall Of Fame
- 2012–13: Inducted into ECHL Hall of Fame
