= Dave Craievich =

Canadian ice hockey player (born 1971)

- Born: May 3, 1971 (age 55) Chatham, Ontario, Canada
- Height: 6 ft 1 in (185 cm)
- Weight: 181 lb (82 kg; 12 st 13 lb)
- Position: Defence
- Shot: Right
- Played for: AHL; Utica Devils; Hershey Bears; IHL; Cincinnati Cyclones; Minnesota Moose; Chicago Wolves; ECHL; Cincinnati Cyclones; Birmingham Bulls; Mobile Mysticks; Italy; HC Asiago
- NHL draft: 143rd overall, 1991; New Jersey Devils
- Playing career: 1991–2001

Dave Craievich (born May 3, 1971) is a Canadian former professional ice hockey defenceman. Craievich was selected by the New Jersey Devils in the seventh round (143rd overall) of the 1991 NHL entry draft.

Craievich played major junior hockey in the Ontario Hockey League (OHL) with the Oshawa Generals. He went on to play ten seasons of professional hockey, including nine seasons in the ECHL where between 1991 and 2000 he played in 516 ECHL games and finished his career with 467 points to rank as the third all-time points leader among ECHL defencemen.

In 2013 Craievich was inducted into the ECHL Hall of Fame.

== Career statistics ==
			Regular season					Playoffs
Season	Team	League	GP	G	A	Pts	PIM	GP	G	A	Pts	PIM
1988–89	Oshawa Generals	OHL	62	2	23	25	78	6	0	0	0	11
1989–90	Oshawa Generals	OHL	59	6	18	24	127	17	0	6	6	28
1990–91	Oshawa Generals	OHL	66	12	30	42	118	16	4	5	9	21
1991–92	Cincinnati Cyclones	ECHL	50	11	29	40	166	8	1	8	9	15
1991–92	Utica Devils	AHL	9	0	0	0	4	1	0	0	0	4
1992–93	Cincinnati Cyclones	IHL	21	0	3	3	33	—	—	—	—	—
1992–93	Birmingham Bulls	ECHL	56	10	35	45	139	—	—	—	—	—
1993–94	Cincinnati Cyclones	IHL	3	0	0	0	0	—	—	—	—	—
1993–94	Birmingham Bulls	ECHL	64	18	58	76	218	10	5	10	15	14
1994–95	Birmingham Bulls	ECHL	59	20	46	66	140	7	4	4	8	10
1994–95	Minnesota Moose	IHL	2	0	0	0	0	—	—	—	—	—
1995–96	Mobile Mysticks	ECHL	65	23	51	74	157	—	—	—	—	—
1996–97	Mobile Mysticks	ECHL	65	13	25	38	125	3	0	1	1	0
1996–97	Hershey Bears	AHL	2	0	0	0	2	—	—	—	—	—
1997–98	Mobile Mysticks	ECHL	70	17	48	65	116	3	0	1	1	8
1997–98	Chicago Wolves	IHL	3	0	0	0	2	17	0	1	1	6
1998–99	Mobile Mysticks	ECHL	60	10	38	48	90	—	—	—	—	—
1998–99	Chicago Wolves	IHL	1	0	0	0	0	—	—	—	—	—
1999–00	Mobile Mysticks	ECHL	27	1	14	15	20	—	—	—	—	—
2000–01	HC Asiago	Italy	38	3	7	10	72	2	2	0	2	6
AHL totals			11	0	0	0	6	1	0	0	0	4
ECHL totals			516	123	344	467	1171	31	10	24	34	47
