= Rod Taylor (ice hockey) =

American ice hockey player (born 1966)

- Born: December 1, 1966 (age 58) Lake Orion, Michigan, U.S
- Height: 5 ft 10 in (178 cm)
- Weight: 185 lb (84 kg; 13 st 3 lb)
- Position: Left wing
- Shot: Left
- Played for: Hampton Roads Admirals; Peoria Rivermen; Richmond Renegades; Roanoke Express; South Carolina Stingrays; Toledo Storm
- NHL draft: Undrafted
- Playing career: 1992–2006

Rod Taylor (born December 1, 1966) is an American former professional ice hockey player. Taylor played twelve years in the East Coast Hockey League, scoring 689 points in 678 games. He is the second all-time career scorer in the ECHL and was inducted to the ECHL Hall of Fame in 2009. In 2019, he became head coach of the Norfolk Admirals in the ECHL.

== Career ==
After four years at Ferris State University, Taylor joined the Hampton Roads Admirals of the East Coast Hockey League on December 14, 1991. With the exception of a recall to the AHL's Baltimore Skipjacks during the 1992-93 AHL season, Taylor spent nine seasons with the Admirals, leading the team in scoring five times, and winning two ECHL championships (Riley Cup, 1992; Kelly Cup, 1998.) He remaining with the team until the Admirals until the team suspended operations after the 1999-2000 ECHL season. Taylor holds several Admirals' franchise records, including career goals scored, points scored, and games played.

Taylor joined the nearby Richmond Renegades for the 2000-01 ECHL season, scoring 56 points in 61 games. On December 29, 2000 Taylor scored his 326th ECHL goal, surpassing the career mark set by former Renagades' forward Trevor Jobe. Taylor returned to the Renagades for the 2001-02 ECHL season. Despite scoring near a point-per-game pace during the first fifteen games of the season, Taylor was benched with rumors starting that Taylor might be traded for the first time in his professional career.

Taylor joined the South Carolina Stingrays for the 2002-03 ECHL season. As a member of the Stingrays, Taylor set another career ECHL record. On January 29, 2003 Taylor assisted on a goal scored by Ryan Brindley, giving Taylor his 686th career point, passing the career mark previously set by Darryl Noren. Following the game, Taylor's game-worn jersey was immediately shipped to the Hockey Hall Of Fame in Toronto. Several weeks after setting the ECHL's all-time scoring record, the Stingrays place Taylor on waivers. After being waived by the Stingrays, Taylor joined the Peoria Rivermen on March 7, 2003. After scoring one assist in two games, Taylor was waived by the Rivermen due to the team not being able to guarantee him a spot on the playoff roster. Taylor joined the Toledo Storm on March 22, 2003, signing as a free agent. He played two games with the team but did not score any points. After twelve years in the ECHL, Taylor retired after the 2002-03 season.

Taylor's points scoring record lasted for ten months, with then-Mississippi Sea Wolves forward Louis Dumont breaking the record on November 20, 2003 after he knocked in a rebound for his 690th career point.

Taylor briefly came out of retirement to play for the Richmond Riverdogs of the United Hockey League in 2005. The 39-year-old Taylor played one game and scored two goals.

After his retirement, Taylor returned to the Hampton Roads area. He was named to the ECHL Hall of Fame in 2009. Joining the Hall of Fame with Taylor was former coach John Brophy, who coached Taylor during his tenure with the Hampton Roads Admirals.

Many of Taylor's ECHL records remained unbroken for several years. Taylor held the ECHL goal-scoring record for twelve years until Alaska Aces forward Wes Goldie scored his 369th ECHL goal against the Ontario Reign on March 24, 2012.

== Awards and accomplishments ==
| Award | Year |
|---|---|
| All-CCHA Second team | 1990-91 |

- 1991-92: Riley Cup champion (Hampton Roads Admirals)
- 1993-94: Leading scorer, Hampton Roads Admirals (88 points)
- 1994-95: ECHL Second All-Star Team (left wing)
- 1997-98: Kelly Cup champion (Hampton Roads Admirals)
- 2002-03: ECHL 15th Anniversary First Team (left wing)
- 2007-08: Inducted into the Admirals Hall Of Fame
- 2009: Inducted into ECHL Hall of Fame

== Records ==
=== ECHL ===
- Most goals scored (368) (since broken by Wes Goldie on March 24, 2012)
- Most points scored (689) (since broken by Louis Dumont on November 20, 2003)
- 30 goal seasons (8)
- Consecutive 30 goal seasons (6, 1993–98)

=== Hampton Roads Admirals ===
- Games Played (528)
- Goals scored (312)
- Points scored (565)
- Penalty minutes (856)
- Seasons Played (9)

== See also ==
- ECHL Hall of Fame
