= Valicevic =

Valicevic is a surname. Notable people with the surname include:

- Chris Valicevic (born 1968), American ice hockey player
- Rob Valicevic (born 1971), American ice hockey player

== See also ==
- Vulićević
