= Sam Ftorek =

American ice hockey player

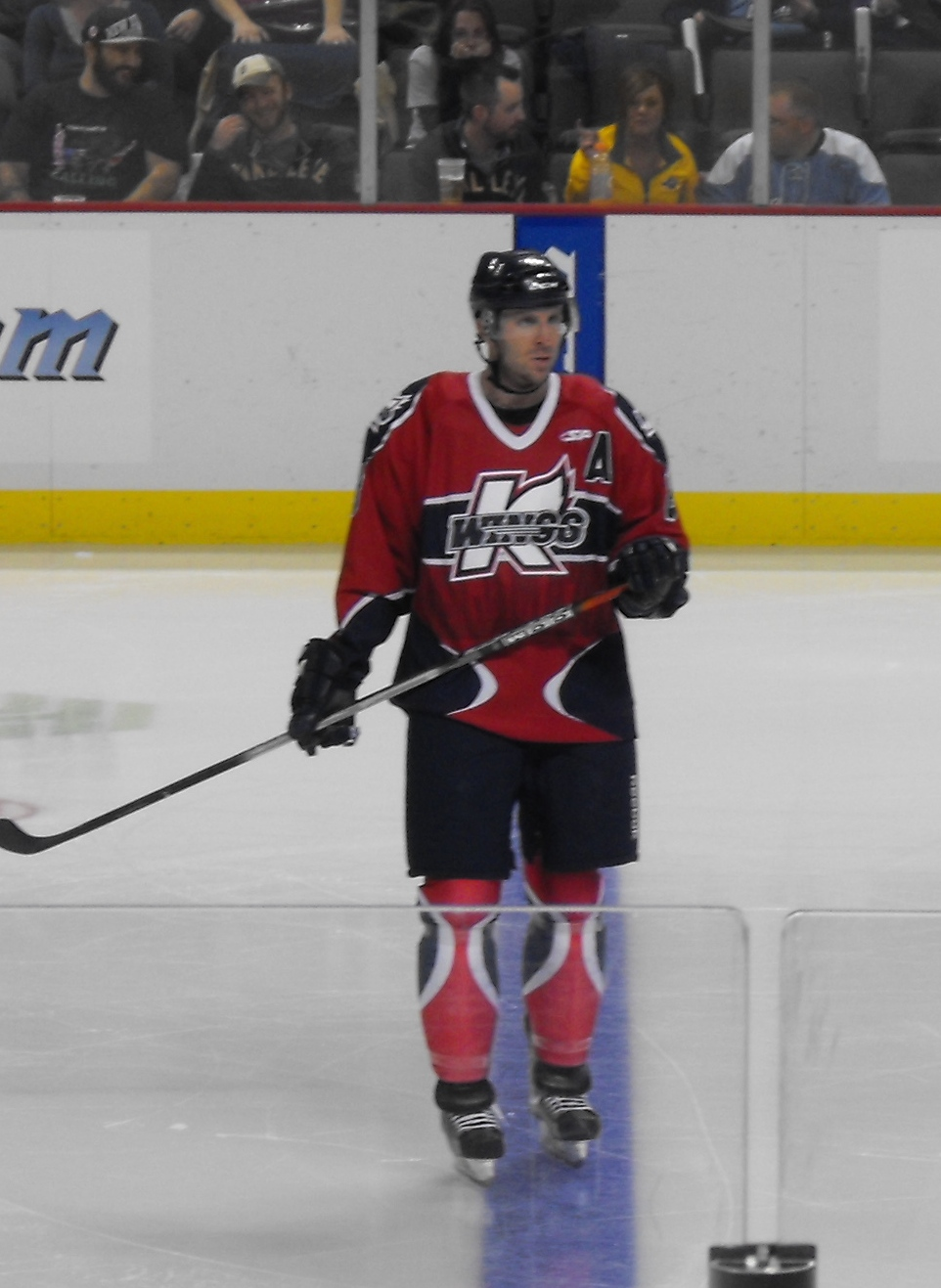
- Born: November 30, 1974 (age 51) Phoenix, Arizona, U.S.
- Height: 6 ft 1 in (185 cm)
- Weight: 192 lb (87 kg; 13 st 10 lb)
- Position: Defense
- Shot: Right
- Played for: AHL; Manchester Monarchs; ECHL; Augusta Lynx; Mobile Mysticks; Greensboro Generals; Gwinnett Gladiators; Fresno Falcons; Cincinnati Cyclones; Kalamazoo Wings; Norfolk Admirals; NLA; Kloten Flyers; BISL; Bracknell Bees
- NHL draft: Undrafted
- Playing career: 1998–2015; 2017—2018

Sam Ftorek (fit-TORE-eck; born November 30, 1974) is an American former professional ice hockey defenseman, who last played with the Norfolk Admirals of the ECHL. He is the son of former NHL player and coach Robbie Ftorek. Currently, he serves as head coach of the Saint Anselm Hawks women's ice hockey team; he was hired in 2024.

He played with the Kalamazoo Wings of the ECHL from 2009 to 2015. On June 18, 2015, Ftorek announced his retirement from professional hockey after 17 seasons and was announced as an assistant coach with the Kalamazoo Wings.

On April 29, 2016, after one season as an assistant coach in Kalamazoo, he was named the first head coach of the Southern Professional Hockey League's Roanoke Rail Yard Dawgs.

In December 2017, Ftorek was elected to the ECHL Hall of Fame. 11 days later, on December 18, 2017, Ftorek was relieved of his coaching duties in Roanoke, in favor of Dan Bremner. Over 74 games in the Rail Yard Dawgs' two seasons, Ftorek's team finished with a record of 22–41–11. He would return to the Norfolk Admirals as a player for 22 games, before retiring again at the end of the '17-'18 season.

== Awards and honors ==
Award	Year
All-ECHL First Team	2013–14
ECHL Hall of Fame	2018
