= Al MacIsaac =

Canadian ice hockey player and executive

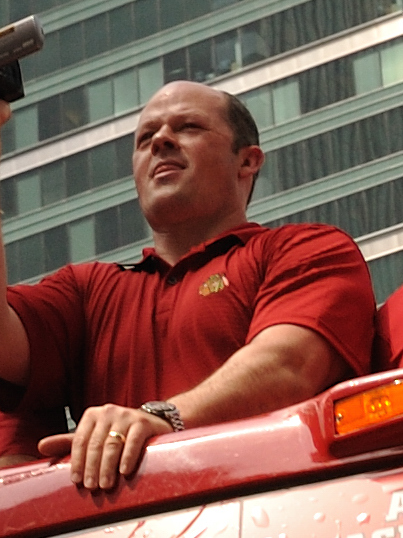
- MacIssaac in 2010
- Born: October 10, 1967 (age 58) Antigonish, Nova Scotia, Canada
- Height: 6 ft 1 in (185 cm)
- Weight: 202 lb (92 kg; 14 st 6 lb)
- Position: Defence
- Shot: Left
- Played for: Baltimore Skipjacks; Cape Breton Oilers
- NHL draft: 232nd overall, 1987; Buffalo Sabres
- Playing career: 1991–1993

Al MacIsaac (born October 10, 1967) is a Canadian former professional ice hockey executive and player. He is the former Senior Vice President of Hockey Operations of the Chicago Blackhawks of the National Hockey League. He was employed by the Chicago Blackhawks from 2000-2021 and previously served as Senior Director of Hockey Administration/Assistant to the President. He resigned in 2021, in the wake of the 2010 Chicago Blackhawks sexual assault scandal.

A native of Antigonish, Nova Scotia, he attended St. Francis Xavier University where he graduated in 1991. He was awarded the STFXU Student/Athlete of the Year award for his senior year and was inducted into the St. Francis Xavier University Sports Hall of Fame in 2016.

MacIsaac was the Buffalo Sabres' 12th-round selection in the 1987 NHL entry draft. He played for the ECHL's Hampton Roads Admirals as a defenseman in 1991–92. In 1993, MacIsaac joined the Admirals as assistant general manager, and in 1996, he was named general manager.

MacIsaac has won seven titles in his career, including the 2010, 2013, and 2015 Stanley Cups with the Chicago Blackhawks and the Calder Cup Championship with the Cape Breton Oilers in 1993. He won the 1986 Memorial Cup with the Guelph Platers (OHL), the 1992 Riley Cup with Hampton Roads, and the 1998 Kelly Cup with Hampton Roads (as General Manager).

He is a member of the Guelph City Sports Hall of Fame with the 1986 Guelph Platers team, and was also selected as a member of the Norfolk Admirals Hall of Fame in 2008. In 2014, MacIsaac was inducted into the ECHL Hall of Fame.
