= Chris Valicevic =

American ice hockey player

- Born: April 25, 1968 (age 56); Mt. Clemens, MI, USA
- Height: 6 ft 0 in (183 cm)
- Weight: 200 lb (91 kg; 14 st 4 lb)
- Position: Defense
- Shot: Right
- Played for: AHL; Cornwall Aces; Worcester IceCats; IHL; Houston Aeros; ECHL; Greensboro Monarchs; Louisiana IceGators; RHI; Portland Rage; New Jersey Rockin' Rollers; Sacramento River Rats
- NHL draft: Undrafted
- Playing career: 1993–2002

Chris Valicevic (born April 25, 1968) is an American former professional ice hockey defenseman of Croatian ancestry. who spent the majority of his career with the ECHL's Louisiana IceGators. He is the fifth all-time career scorer in the ECHL with 611 points.

== ECHL ==
Valicevic spent seven seasons with the Louisiana IceGators, and was named to the ECHL All-Star Game seven times, an ECHL record. Of those seven times he was named to the All-Star team, he was named to the First Team All-ECHL team five time, also an ECHL record. Valicevic was also named ECHL Most Valuable Player for the 1998-1999 season. Valicevic retired with 460 assists and 611 points, which made him the career regular season and postseason leader among defensemen in assists and points. His 102 postseason games are also an ECHL record.

In 2008, Valievic was inducted into the ECHL Hall of Fame. Valicevic was joined by ECHL founder Henry Brabham, the league's first commissioner Patrick J. Kelly, and goaltender Nick Vitucci as members of the Hall of Fame's inaugural class.

== Awards ==
- 1993–94: ECHL All-Star
- 1995–96: ECHL All-Star
- 1995–96: ECHL Defenseman Of The Year
- 1996–97: ECHL All-Star
- 1996–97: ECHL Defenseman Of The Year
- 1997–98: ECHL All-Star
- 1997–98: ECHL Defenseman Of The Year
- 1998–99: ECHL All-Star
- 1998–99: ECHL Defenseman Of The Year
- 1998–99: ECHL Most Valuable Player
- 1999–2000: ECHL All-Star
- 2000–01: ECHL All-Star
- 2007–08: Named to the ECHL Hall of Fame
