= Roanoke Valley Rampage =

- City: Vinton, Virginia
- League: ECHL
- Division: East
- Founded: 1981 (In the CHL)
- Operated: 1992–93
- Home arena: LancerLot Sports Complex
- Colors: Blue, red, white
- Owner: Larry Revo
- Head coach: Steve Gatzos

Franchise history
- 1981-1983: Nashville South Stars
- 1983–1990: Virginia Lancers
- 1990–1992: Roanoke Valley Rebels
- 1992–1993: Roanoke Valley Rampage
- 1993–1994: Huntsville Blast
- 1994–2001: Tallahassee Tiger Sharks
- 2001–2002: Macon Whoopee
- 2002–2003: Lexington Men O' War
- 2005–2026: Utah Grizzlies
- 2026-present: Trenton Ironhawks

The Roanoke Valley Rampage were a minor league hockey franchise in the ECHL during the 1992–93 season. The Rampage played their games at the LancerLot in Vinton, Virginia. The Rampage had played from 1983 to 1990 as the Virginia Lancers, played as the Roanoke Valley Rebels between 1990 and 1992, and were rebranded as the Rampage.

== History ==
The Rampage were owned by New York businessman Larry Revo, who bought the team from ECHL founder Henry Brabham for $250,000 in the summer of 1992

The 1992–93 Rampage put together what is considered to be one of the worst seasons in ECHL history. The Rampage would start out with moderate success, which included a four-game winning streak at home, and a 6–6 record, which had the team two points out of second place after the first month of the season. From that point forward, however, the team's level of play deteriorated greatly.

The Rampage set several records that season, including fewest wins in a season (14), lowest winning percentage (.227), fewest points (29), most consecutive road losses (26), fewest road wins (2), and most road losses (29 of a possible 31), all records that are still standing in the present-day ECHL. The Rampage would also set a record for lowest average attendance in a season with an average of 1,483 fans per game.

The Rampage would also allow a league-worst 6.05 GAA and 387 goals against in 64 games. Both were records until the Huntington Blizzard eclipsed the marks with a 6.07 GAA and 413 goals against in 68 games.

== Arena collapse ==
Weather eventually played a factor into the Rampage only lasting one season. On March 13, 1993, the Rampage were trailing the Richmond Renegades 6–2 with 6:03 left in the second period. Officials decided to call the game due to structural damage to the LancerLot Arena. A beam supporting the arena started to buckle due to the 16 inches (40 cm) of snow on the roof and 40 mph (65 kmph) winds outside. All 63 fans (believed to also be an ECHL record for lowest paid attendance) were told to leave the arena, along with officials, players, coaches, and arena employees. This decision was fully vindicated when later that night the roof of the arena collapsed completely under the weight of the snow.

== Season finale ==
The Rampage would finish their season without equipment, all of it still buried in the rubble of the LancerLot Arena and with a roster of 11 players: nine skaters and two goalies. They would make the trip to the Norfolk Scope and play their final game as the Rampage on March 16, 1993, a game that would be delayed twice due to weather and the Rampage being unwilling to abandon their equipment. The Rampage would end up borrowing jerseys (red and black with no logo, formerly owned by the Winston-Salem Thunderbirds) from a local recreation league team. The Rampage would also use two players, Ed Dearborn and Dave Silver, from a local Virginia Beach recreation league to fill out their roster. Dearborn was an employee at the nearby Iceland Skating Rink in Virginia Beach, and Silver was a car salesman. They would lose to the Hampton Roads Admirals 9–4. Three Admirals players (Kurt Kabat, Victor Gervais and Brian Martin) would score hat tricks in this game. At the completion of the game, the Admirals fans would give the Rampage a standing ovation.

== Relocation of team ==
After the collapse of the LancerLot Arena, owner Larry Revo considered both selling and relocating the team. Initially, Revo has discussions of selling the team to Baltimore Skipjacks owner Tom Ebright, but later said that it was "unlikely I'd sell it, period. But it's not something I haven't done in the past." Revo also considered the option of relocating to Huntsville.

Revo would later move the team to Huntsville, but would sell the team to Huntsville Hockey Inc., a local ownership group, less than a month into the 1993–94 ECHL season.

== Season-by-season results ==
| Season | Games | Won | Lost | Tied | Points | GF | GA | PIM | Playoffs |
|---|---|---|---|---|---|---|---|---|---|
| 1992-93 | 64 | 14 | 49 | 1 | 29 | 227 | 387 | 1265 | Did not qualify |

== League records ==
| Season | Record | Number | Team |
|---|---|---|---|
| 1992-93 | Fewest Points | 29 | Roanoke Valley Rebels |
| | Fastest 2 goals (both teams) | 3 seconds | aRoanoke Valley Rebels vs Hampton Roads Admirals |
| | Fewest Road Wins | 2 | Roanoke Valley Rebels |
| | Fewest Ties | 1(tie)b | Roanoke Valley Rebels |
| | Fewest Wins | 14 (tie)c | Roanoke Valley Rebels |
| | Longest Road Winless Streak | 26 | Roanoke Valley Rebels |
| | Lowest Winning % | .227 | Roanoke Valley Rebels |
| | Most Road Losses | 29 (tie)d | Roanoke Valley Rebels |

a - 1-22-93, Scott Burfoot of Roanoke Valley scored at 10:35 1st period. Kelly Sorensen of Hampton Roads would score three seconds later at 10:38
b - tied with Carolina Thunderbirds, Knoxville Cherokees (1993-94)
c - tied with Knoxville Cherokees (1996-97)
d - tied with Huntington Blizzard (1993-94)
