= Steve Chapman (ice hockey) =

Steve Chapman is an ice hockey executive. From 2002 to 2015, he served as the president and general manager of the Gwinnett Gladiators of the ECHL after serving in the same capacity with the Mobile Mysticks from 1995 to 2001. He also served nine terms as the ECHL's Chairman of the Board of Governors from 2006 until 2015. In 2015, he was hired by the St. Louis Blues of the National Hockey League as group vice president of brand, community and partnership development.

Chapman was the first person to be named the ECHL Executive of the Year twice, receiving the award for both the 2004–05 and 2005–06 ECHL seasons. He was elected into the ECHL Hall of Fame in 2018.
