= Shawn Wheeler =

American ice hockey player and coach

- Born: June 8, 1966 (age 59) Mount Vernon, New York, U.S.
- Height: 6 ft 1 in (185 cm)
- Weight: 205 lb (93 kg; 14 st 9 lb)
- Position: Left wing
- Shot: Left
- Played for: Maine Mariners; Peoria Rivermen; Hershey Bears; Providence Bruins
- Playing career: 1990–1997

Shawn Wheeler (born June 8, 1966) is a retired professional ice hockey forward and coach. He was born in Mount Vernon, New York.

Wheeler played college hockey at the University of Wisconsin-Stevens Point, where he helped lead the Pointers in back-to-back National Championships in 1989 and 1990. Wheeler led the team in penalty minutes in all four of his seasons and averaged over a point a game, compiling 76 goals and 78 assists in 136 games. His professional playing career consisted of time in the East Coast Hockey League with the Hampton Roads Admirals, Greensboro Monarchs and Charlotte Checkers; the American Hockey League with the Providence Bruins and Hershey Bears; and as a noted power forward for the Peoria Rivermen of the International Hockey League. He scored 30 goals in four different seasons in the ECHL, despite high totals in penalty minutes each season. In 1991-92, his 301 penalty minutes were the fifth-highest total in the league, while he scored a career-high 36 goals. Wheeler was notable as the most prominent African-American player in the ECHL at the time; this, combined with his rough playing style, made him an occasional target of hostility from opposing fans.

In 1995, Wheeler signed as a free agent, moving from the Hampton Roads Admirals to their rival the Charlotte Checkers, where he began his coaching career as a player/assistant coach under head coach John Marks. The following season, he played a key role in the Checkers' championship title. Following his retirement from playing in 1996-97, he took on the role of the Checkers' assistant coach. He was named head coach in 1998 after Marks accepted the same role with the Greenville Grrowl.

== Coaching career ==
Wheeler became the first African American head coach in league history, but his tenure lasted only a season and a half. Wheeler guided the Checkers to a record of 43–48–14; midway through the 1999–2000 season, he was reassigned as Assistant General Manager and replaced as head coach by Don McAdam. Wheeler then accepted a position with WFNZ radio in Charlotte, where he co-hosted and hosted mid-day and weekend shows.
