= Utah Grizzlies =

Professional minor league ice hockey team in Salt Lake City, Utah

- City: West Valley City, Utah
- League: ECHL
- Conference: Western
- Division: Mountain
- Founded: 1981 (in the CHL)
- Home arena: Maverik Center
- Colors: Green, black, copper, white
- Owners: Pro Hockey Partners, LLC
- General manager: Erik Hudson
- Head coach: John Becanic
- Media: KSOP; FloTv
- Affiliates: Colorado Avalanche (NHL); Colorado Eagles (AHL)
- Website: utahgrizzlies.com

Franchise history
- 1981–1983: Nashville South Stars
- 1983–1990: Virginia Lancers
- 1990–1992: Roanoke Valley Rebels
- 1992–1993: Roanoke Valley Rampage
- 1993–1994: Huntsville Blast
- 1994–2001: Tallahassee Tiger Sharks
- 2001–2002: Macon Whoopee
- 2002–2003: Lexington Men O' War
- 2005–2026: Utah Grizzlies
- 2026: Trenton Ironhawks

Championships
- Division titles: 1 (2021–22)

The Utah Grizzlies were a professional ice hockey team in the ECHL. They played their home games at Maverik Center in West Valley City, Utah.

== History ==
=== Pre-history ===
The current Utah Grizzlies franchise started in 1981 as the Nashville South Stars in Nashville, Tennessee, in the Central Hockey League. Henry Brabham then took over the team in 1983 and relocated them to Vinton, Virginia mid-season, to become the Virginia Lancers. Brabham and the Lancers were then one of the founding members of the East Coast Hockey League (ECHL) in 1988.

The franchise was sold and relocated several times until it went dormant after the 2002–03 season. After the American Hockey League (AHL) incarnation of the Grizzlies suspended operations in 2005, David Elmore and Donna Tuttle of the Elmore Sports Group bought the rights to the dormant ECHL franchise and moved the team to the E Center to replace the previous Grizzlies franchise.

=== ECHL Grizzlies ===
Prior to the 2013–14 season, their NHL affiliate Calgary Flames changed their affiliation to the Alaska Aces. Incoming head coach and general manager Tim Branham announced a three-year agreement with the Anaheim Ducks on August 7, 2013. After the Grizzlies made the post-season in every season within the Ducks organization, the Grizzlies and Ducks agreed to a multi-year extension during the 2015–16 season.

Following the 2017–18 season, the Grizzlies missed the post-season for the first time in 11 years. At that time, their ECHL rival, the Colorado Eagles, joined the American Hockey League as an affiliate of the Colorado Avalanche after previously serving as the Avalanche affiliate in the ECHL. The Grizzlies ended their agreement with the Ducks and affiliated with the Avalanche, their then-closest geographical NHL club.

Despite the arrival of the NHL in Utah in 2024, with the Utah Mammoth, the Grizzlies and Mammoth were never affiliated.

=== Relocation to Trenton, New Jersey ===
On July 23, 2025, West Valley City officials announced that they had agreed to a deal to sell the team to Delaware-based Pro Hockey Partners, LLC who will relocate the team to a different market for the 2026–27 season. Longtime owner David Elmore had died, and his widow Donna was in poor health, leading the family to sell. However, city council approval was required because the city owned a large minority stake in the team. The former ECHL market Trenton, New Jersey, was the rumored destination for the Grizzlies. The team was reported be playing at the CURE Insurance Arena which is the former home of the Trenton Titans/Trenton Devils. On September 9, 2025, the Grizzlies confirmed the sale to Pro Hockey Partners, LLC and the relocation to Trenton. The Grizzlies will be rebranded to the Trenton Ironhawks.

== Season-by-season record ==
Note: GP = Games played, W = Wins, L = Losses, OTL = Overtime losses, SOL= Shootout losses, Pts = Points, GF = Goals for, GA = Goals against, PIM = Penalty infraction minutes

Regular season											Playoffs				
Season	GP	W	L	OTL	SOL	Pts	GF	GA	PIM	Standing	Year	1st round	2nd round	3rd round	Kelly Cup
2005–06	72	36	30	5	1	78	235	236	1712	4th of 6, West	2006	L, 0–4, AK	—	—	—
2006–07	72	22	42	4	4	52	184	294	1953	5th of 5, West	2007	did not qualify			
2007–08	72	32	30	2	8	74	239	259	1595	4th of 5, West	2008	W, 4–2, FRE	W, 4–1, VIC	L, 0–4, LV	—
2008–09	72	28	28	6	10	72	220	246	1372	4th of 6, West	2009	L, 1–4, AK	—	—	—
2009–10	72	34	29	4	5	77	260	253	1292	3rd of 4, West	2010	W, 3–2, LV	L, 0–4, IDH	—	—
2010–11	72	33	32	4	3	73	189	227	1674	3rd of 4, Mountain	2011	W, 3–1, STK	L, 0–4, VIC	—	—
2011–12	72	33	33	0	6	72	183	223	1573	3rd of 4, Mountain	2012	L, 0–3, LV	—	—	—
2012–13	72	29	30	4	9	71	217	277	1741	4th of 4, Mountain	2013	L, 0–4, ONT	—	—	—
2013–14	71	38	24	3	6	85	187	173	1329	3rd of 4, Mountain	2014	L, 1–4, BAK	—	—	—
2014–15	72	37	27	5	3	82	213	219	1170	4th of 7, Pacific	2015	W, 4–2, IDH	L, 1–4, ONT	—	—
2015–16	72	39	27	3	3	84	223	206	942	3rd of 5, West	2016	W, 4–2, COL	L, 0–4, FW	—	—
2016–17	72	36	29	5	2	79	225	240	1312	4th of 7, Mountain	2017	L, 1–4, ALN	—	—	—
2017–18	72	28	29	9	6	71	230	256	1212	6th of 7, Mountain	2018	did not qualify			
2018–19	72	37	26	4	5	83	232	218	1264	3rd of 7, Mountain	2019	L, 1–4, IDH	—	—	—
2019–20	62	34	17	7	4	79	207	164	884	3rd of 7, Mountain	2020	Season cancelled due to the COVID-19 pandemic			
2020–21	72	35	26	5	6	81	207	219	1037	4th of 7, Western	2021	—	L, 0–3, ALN	—	—
2021–22	72	42	27	2	1	87	240	225	959	1st of 7, Mountain	2022	W, 4–3, TUL	W, 4–2, RC	L, 1–4, TOL	—
2022–23	72	35	33	4	0	74	230	259	1316	4th of 7, Mountain	2023	L, 2–4, IDH	—	—	—
2023–24	72	31	36	5	0	67	227	264	750	5th of 7, Mountain	2024	did not qualify			
2024–25	72	25	39	6	2	58	226	292	741	7th of 8, Mountain	2025	did not qualify			
2025–26	72	30	32	9	1	70	237	255	727	5th of 8, Mountain	2026	did not qualify			
