= Trenton Ironhawks =

Professional minor league ice hockey team in Trenton, New Jersey

- City: Trenton, New Jersey
- League: ECHL
- Founded: 1981 (in the CHL)
- Home arena: CURE Insurance Arena
- Colors: Blue, grey, red, white
- Owners: Pro Hockey Partners, LLC
- General manager: Erik Hudson
- Head coach: Chuck Weber
- Affiliates: New York Islanders (NHL); Hamilton Hammers (AHL)
- Website: trentonironhawks.com

Franchise history
- 1981–1983: Nashville South Stars
- 1983–1990: Virginia Lancers
- 1990–1992: Roanoke Valley Rebels
- 1992–1993: Roanoke Valley Rampage
- 1993–1994: Huntsville Blast
- 1994–2001: Tallahassee Tiger Sharks
- 2001–2002: Macon Whoopee
- 2002–2003: Lexington Men O' War
- 2005–2026: Utah Grizzlies
- 2026–present: Trenton Ironhawks

The Trenton Ironhawks are a professional ice hockey team in the ECHL. The team began play in the 2026–27 ECHL season following the relocation of the Utah Grizzlies to Trenton, New Jersey. The Ironhawks are affiliated with the New York Islanders of the National Hockey League (NHL) and play their home games at CURE Insurance Arena.

== History ==
=== Pre-history ===
The former Utah Grizzlies franchise started in 1981 as the Nashville South Stars in Nashville, Tennessee, in the Central Hockey League. Henry Brabham then took over the team in 1983 and relocated them to Vinton, Virginia mid-season, to become the Virginia Lancers. Brabham and the Lancers were then one of the founding members of the East Coast Hockey League (ECHL) in 1988.

The franchise was sold and relocated several times until it went dormant after the 2002–03 season. After the American Hockey League (AHL) incarnation of the Grizzlies suspended operations in 2005, David Elmore (Elmore Sports Group) and his wife, Donna Tuttle bought the rights to the dormant ECHL franchise and moved the team to the E Center to replace the previous Grizzlies franchise.

=== Relocation to Trenton, New Jersey ===
On July 23, 2025, West Valley City officials announced that they had agreed to a deal to sell the team to Delaware-based Pro Hockey Partners, LLC who will relocate the team to a different market for the 2026–27 season. The former ECHL market Trenton, New Jersey, was the rumored destination for the Grizzlies. The team was reported be playing at the CURE Insurance Arena which is the former home of the Trenton Titans/Trenton Devils. On September 9, 2025, the Grizzlies confirmed the sale to Pro Hockey Partners, LLC and the relocation to Trenton. On January 13, 2026, it was announced that the Grizzlies would be rebranded to the Trenton Ironhawks.

On May 20, 2026, the Ironhawks announced their first affiliation in their Trenton era, being with the New York Islanders of the NHL and the Hamilton Hammers of the AHL.
