= Mark Bernard =

Canadian ice hockey player and coach

- Born: February 1, 1969 (age 56); Hamilton, Ontario, Canada
- Height: 5 ft 7 in (170 cm)
- Weight: 181 lb (82 kg; 12 st 13 lb)
- Position: Goaltender
- Caught: Right
- Played for: AHL; Rochester Americans; Baltimore Skipjacks; ECHL; Johnstown Chiefs; Hampton Roads Admirals; Erie Panthers; Toledo Storm; CHL; San Antonio Iguanas
- NHL draft: Undrafted
- Playing career: 1990–2006

Mark Bernard (born February 1, 1969) is a Canadian former professional ice hockey goaltender and coach.

Bernard is the current General Manager of the American Hockey League's Rockford IceHogs, a position he has held since the 2010–11 AHL season.
