= Lexington Men O' War =

- City: Lexington, Kentucky
- League: East Coast Hockey League
- Conference: Northern
- Division: Northwest
- Founded: 1981 (In the CHL)
- Operated: 2002–03
- Home arena: Rupp Arena
- Head coach: Jim Wiley

Franchise history
- 1981-1983: Nashville South Stars
- 1983–1990: Virginia Lancers
- 1990–1992: Roanoke Valley Rebels
- 1992–1993: Roanoke Valley Rampage
- 1993–1994: Huntsville Blast
- 1994–2001: Tallahassee Tiger Sharks
- 2001–2002: Macon Whoopee
- 2002–2003: Lexington Men O' War
- 2005–2026: Utah Grizzlies
- 2026-present: Trenton Ironhawks

The Lexington Men O' War were a minor league professional ice hockey team and member of the ECHL. The name Man o' War is from a thoroughbred race horse that was bred in Lexington, and also the name of a highly traveled road in Lexington. The Men O' War played at Rupp Arena in Lexington, Kentucky from 2002 to 2003 and were owned by Elmore Sports Group.

They finished with a record of 34-31-7 and 75 points, which placed them fourth in the Northwest Division. However, they only brought in an average of 2,368 fans per game, the fourth-fewest in the league. The team drew the Toledo Storm in the first round of the playoffs that year, and were swept in three games (1–9, 0–3, 1–5). Van Burgess led the team in points with 55, while Mark Smith paced the team with 22 goals. Jay Banach paced the team with 191 penalty minutes. Dan Murphy played a team high 43 games in net, and won 21.

The team folded following the 2002–03 season, and would later be revived as the Utah Grizzlies beginning in the 2005–06 season.

== Season-by-season results ==
Season	GP	W	L	T	Pts	GF	GA	Playoffs
2002–03	72	34	31	7	75	188	212	Lost Div. Semifinals, 0–3 vs. Toledo Storm
