= Vulićević =

Vulićević (Serbian Cyrillic: Вулићевић) is a surname. Notable people with the surname include:

- Đuša Vulićević (1771–1805), Serbian noble and revolutionary
- Miroslav Vulićević (born 1985), Serbian footballer
- Vujica Vulićević (1773–1828), Serbian noble and revolutionary
