= Nashville South Stars =

- City: Nashville
- League: Central Hockey League; Atlantic Coast Hockey League
- Operated: 1981–1983
- Home arena: Nashville Municipal Auditorium
- Colors: Green, gold, black, white
- Affiliates: Minnesota North Stars

Franchise history
- 1981–1983: Nashville South Stars
- 1983–1990: Virginia Lancers
- 1990–1992: Roanoke Valley Rebels
- 1992–1993: Roanoke Valley Rampage
- 1993–1994: Huntsville Blast
- 1994–2001: Tallahassee Tiger Sharks
- 2001–2002: Macon Whoopee
- 2002–2003: Lexington Men O' War
- 2005–2026: Utah Grizzlies
- 2026-present: Trenton Ironhawks

The Nashville South Stars were a professional ice hockey team in the Central Hockey League (CHL) for the 1981–82 season. They then played in the Atlantic Coast Hockey League (ACHL) for the 1982–83 season and part of the 1983–84 season before the franchise relocated to become the Virginia Lancers.

It had been 10 years since Nashville's last hockey team, the Nashville Dixie Flyers, played as part of the Eastern Hockey League.

The South Stars were founded by Larry Schmittou, who was a principal owner of the Nashville Sounds minor-league baseball team. The team played at Nashville Municipal Auditorium, where the hockey seating configuration was such that spectators seated more than a row back in the seats that were above and behind the goal lines could not see the nets.

The team was the top affiliate of the Minnesota North Stars of the National Hockey League and was coached by Gene Ubriaco, who would later coach the Pittsburgh Penguins of the NHL.

The South Stars reached the CHL playoffs, but lost in the first round to the Wichita Wind.

The Nashville South Stars played only for one season in the CHL before joining the Atlantic Coast Hockey League for the 1982–83 season. The franchise would relocate to Vinton, Virginia during the next season in December 1983.

== Notable personnel ==
- Mike Antonovich, a former Minnesota high school hero who starred in the World Hockey Association. He went on the play in the NHL with both the Minnesota North Stars and the New Jersey Devils.
- Goaltender Don Beaupre played in five games for the South Stars during an injury rehab posting.
- Bob Suter, a defenseman on the Miracle on Ice U.S. gold-medal team in the 1980 Olympic Winter Games. His son, Ryan Suter, was the first-round draft choice of the NHL's Nashville Predators in 2003.
- John Tortorella, right wing, played with the South Stars during the 1983-84 ACHL season. In 1996 he became the Calder Cup winning head coach of the Rochester Americans, and in 2004 the Stanley Cup winning head coach with the Tampa Bay Lightning.
- Gene Ubriaco, head coach, went on coach the Pittsburgh Penguins of the NHL.
- Warren Young, a regular member of the 1981–82 team, wound up with Ubriaco and the Penguins and benefited one season from the assist-making of Mario Lemieux. But after one 40-goal season, Young quickly faded into obscurity.

== Season-by-season record ==
Note: GP = Games played, W = Wins, L = Losses, T = Ties, Pts = Points, GF = Goals for, GA = Goals against, PIM = Penalties in minutes

Central Hockey League
Season	GP	W	L	T	Pts	GF	GA	PIM	Finish	Playoffs
1981–82	78	41	35	4	86	313	319	2057	4th	Lost Quarterfinals

Playoffs	GP	W	L	GF	GA	Finish
1981–82	3	0	3	55	11	Lost Quarterfinals
