= Patrick J. Kelly (ice hockey) =

Canadian ice hockey player (born 1935)

Pat Kelly
- Born: Patrick J. Kelly; September 8, 1935 (age 90); Sioux Lookout, Ontario, Canada
- Known for: Co-founder of the East Coast Hockey League; Head coach of the Colorado Rockies
- Honours: Member of the ECHL Hall of Fame

Patrick J. "Pat" Kelly (born September 8, 1935) is an American retired ice hockey coach who co-founded and served as the first commissioner of the East Coast Hockey League. He is the namesake of the Kelly Cup. Kelly also coached the Colorado Rockies for two years and the Birmingham Bulls in the late-1970s.

== Early life ==
Kelly was born in Sioux Lookout, Ontario. He played junior hockey with the St. Catharines Teepees of the Ontario Junior Hockey League in 1952.

== Career ==
He played professionally for the Springfield Indians of the American Hockey League, the Trois-Rivières Lions in the Quebec Hockey League, Troy Bruins of the International Hockey League and the Greensboro Generals of the Eastern Hockey League. He helped Crowland capture the 1948–1949 Bantam B Championship of Ontario, beating Peterborough in the finals.

=== Coaching and management ===
Kelly began his coaching career in the Eastern Hockey League with the Jersey Devils and later the Clinton Comets. Clinton was 151–39–28 and won three straight regular season and postseason titles from 1967 to 1970. In the 1967–1968 season, the Comets finished with a 57–5–10 record, making them the only professional team in history to lose only five games or less in a season. In the 1969–1970 season, Kelly was named Minor League Coach of the Year by The Hockey News. Kelly served as head coach and general manager for Charlotte in the Southern Hockey League from 1973–76 guiding the Checkers to a 136–68–12 record, two regular season titles and two postseason titles while earning Coach of the Year honors in the SHL twice.

He coached the Colorado Rockies in the National Hockey League in 1977–78 and is the only coach in history to lead the Rockies into the Stanley Cup Playoffs. Following coaching stops in the AHL, Kelly went to Peoria in the IHL where he led the Rivermen to the Turner Cup in his first season behind the bench in 1984–85. He recorded his 800th career win on January 4, 1987 and was inducted into the Peoria Sports Hall of Fame in February 1990. Kelly was inducted into the Roanoke Hall of Fame and the Sports Hall of Fame in his hometown of Welland, Ontario in 1998, and in March 2002 he became the first inductee into the Greensboro Hockey Hall of Fame when the Generals retired his uniform number (5).

Kelly was named commissioner emeritus of the ECHL following the 1995–1996 season, after serving as commissioner for the first eight seasons of the ECHL. He celebrated his 50th season in hockey in 2002–2003.

In 2008, he was inducted into the ECHL Hall of Fame.

== Coaching record ==
=== National Hockey League ===
Team	Year	Regular season						Postseason
Team	Year	G	W	L	T	Pts	Finish	Result
Colorado Rockies	1977–78	80	19	40	21	59	2nd in Smythe	Lost in preliminary round (0-2 vs. PHI)
Colorado Rockies	1978–79	21	3	14	4	10	4th in Smythe	Fired.
NHL totals	1977-1979	101	22	54	25	69		0-2 (0.000)

=== World Hockey Association ===
Team	Year	Regular season						Postseason
Team	Year	G	W	L	T	Pts	Finish	Result
Birmingham Bulls	1976–77	57	24	30	3	(66)	5th in Eastern	Did not qualify.
WHA totals	1976-1977	57	24	30	3	51		0-0 (0.000)

=== Eastern Hockey League (1954-1973) ===
Team	Year	Regular season						Postseason
Team	Year	G	W	L	T	Pts	Finish	Result
Jersey Devils	1964–65	72	34	34	4	72	4th in Northern	Lost in division semi-finals (1-3 vs. LI)
Clinton Comets	1965–66	72	41	28	3	85	2nd in Northern	Won in division semi-finals (3-0 vs. JON); Lost in division finals (1-4 vs. LI)
Clinton Comets	1966–67	72	44	26	2	90	1st in Northern	Won in division semi-finals (3-0 vs. LI); Lost in division finals (2-4 vs. JER)
Clinton Comets	1967–68	72	57	5	10	114	1st in Northern	Won in division semi-finals (3-0 vs. LI); Won in division finals (4-3 vs. NH); Won Walker Cup (4-0 vs. CHA)
Clinton Comets	1968–69	72	44	18	10	98	1st in Northern	Won in division semi-finals (3-0 vs. LI); Won in division finals (4-3 vs. NH); Won Walker Cup (4-0 vs. NSH)
Clinton Comets	1969–70	74	50	16	8	108	1st in Northern	Won in division semi-finals (4-0 vs. SYR); Won in division finals (4-3 vs. NH); Won Walker Cup (4-2 vs. GBO)
Clinton Comets	1970–71	74	31	32	11	73	4th in Northern	Lost in division semi-finals (1-4 vs. NH)
Clinton Comets	1971–72	75	30	32	13	73	3rd in Northern	Lost in division semi-finals (1-4 vs. JON)
Clinton Comets	1972–73	76	18	51	7	43	3rd in Northern	Did not qualify.
EHL totals	1964-1973	659	349	242	68	766	4 division titles	46-30 (0.605 - 3 Walker Cups)

=== Southern Hockey League ===
Team	Year	Regular season						Postseason
Team	Year	G	W	L	T	Pts	Finish	Result
Charlotte Checkers	1973-74	72	44	27	1	89	2nd in SHL	Won in league semi-finals (4-2 vs. GRE); Lost in James Crockett Cup finals (3-4 vs. RV)
Charlotte Checkers	1974-75	72	50	21	1	101	1st in SHL	Won in league semi-finals (4-0 vs. RV); Won James Crockett Cup (4-2 vs. HAM)
Charlotte Checkers	1975-76	72	42	20	10	94	1st in SHL	Won in league semi-finals (4-2 vs. RV); Won James Crockett Cup (4-1 vs. HAM)
Charlotte Checkers	1976-77	17	10	7	0	20	3rd in SHL	Promoted to Head Coach of Birmingham Bulls
SHL totals	1973-1977	233	146	75	12	294	2 titles	23-11 (0.676 - 2 James Crockett Cups)

=== American Hockey League ===
Team	Year	Regular season						Postseason
Team	Year	G	W	L	T	Pts	Finish	Result
Rochester Americans	1978-79	52	16	27	9	(64)	4th in South	Did not qualify.
Binghamton Dusters	1979-80	30	8	19	3	19	5th in South	Fired.
AHL totals	1978-1980	82	24	46	12	62		0-0 (0.000)

=== Eastern Hockey League (1978-1981) ===
Team	Year	Regular season						Postseason
Team	Year	G	W	L	T	Pts	Finish	Result
Salem Raiders	1980-81	72	32	31	9	73	3rd in EHL	Lost in league semi-finals (2-4 vs. RIC)
EHL totals	1980-1981	72	32	31	9	73		2-4 (0.333)

=== Atlantic Coast Hockey League ===
Team	Year	Regular season						Postseason
Team	Year	G	W	L	T	Pts	Finish	Result
Salem Raiders	1981-82	47	32	15	0	64	1st in ACHL	Won in league semi-finals (4-1 vs. WS); Lost in Payne Trophy finals (2-4 vs. MV)
Virginia Raiders	1982-83	65	20	36	9	49	4th in ACHL	Lost in league semi-finals (0-4 vs. CAR)
ACHL totals	1981-1983	112	52	51	9	113		6-9 (0.400)

=== International Hockey League ===
Team	Year	Regular season							Postseason
Team	Year	G	W	L	T	OTL	Pts	Finish	Result
Peoria Prancers	1983-84	82	29	48	5	-	63	6th in IHL	Did not qualify.
Peoria Rivermen	1984-85	82	48	29	5	-	105	1st in East	Won in league quarter-finals (4-3 vs. IND); Won in league semi-finals (4-2 vs. FW); Won Turner Cup (4-3 vs. MUS)
Peoria Rivermen	1985-86	82	46	31	-	5	97	3rd in West	Won in league quarter-finals (4-1 vs. MIL; Lost in league semi-finals (3-4 vs. FW)
Peoria Rivermen	1986-87	82	31	42	-	9	71	5th in West	Did not qualify.
Peoria Rivermen	1987-88	82	34	41	-	7	75	4th in West	Lost in league quarter-finals (3-4 vs. SL)
IHL totals	1983-1988	410	188	191	10	21	407	1 division title	21-17 (0.553 - 1 Turner Cup)

Preceded by Johnny Wilson	Head coach of the Colorado Rockies; 1977-78	Succeeded by Aldo Guidolin
