= 1992–93 ECHL season =

Ice hockey league season

The 1992–93 ECHL season was the fifth season of the ECHL. In 1992, the league saw numerous changes in team membership. The Winston-Salem Thunderbirds move to Wheeling, WV, becoming the first franchise to make a major relocation, the Roanoke Valley Rebels announced that they were changing their name to the Roanoke Valley Rampage, and the Cincinnati Cyclones announced that they were moving to the International Hockey League and were being replaced with a franchise in Birmingham, AL. The fifteen teams played 64 games in the schedule. The Wheeling Thunderbirds finished first overall in the regular season. The Toledo Storm won their first Riley Cup championship.

== Regular season ==
Note: GP = Games played, W = Wins, L = Losses, T = Ties, Pts = Points, GF = Goals for, GA = Goals against, Green shade = Clinched playoff spot, Blue shade = Clinched division

East Division	GP	W	L	OTL	Pts	GF	GA
Wheeling Thunderbirds	64	40	16	8	88	314	223
Hampton Roads Admirals	64	37	21	6	80	294	235
Raleigh Icecaps	64	37	22	5	'79	289	262
Johnstown Chiefs	64	34	23	7	75	281	264
Richmond Renegades	64	34	28	2	70	292	292
Greensboro Monarchs	64	33	29	2	68	256	261
Roanoke Valley Rampage	64	14	49	1	29	227	387

West Division	GP	W	L	OTL	Pts	GF	GA
Toledo Storm	64	36	17	11	83	316	238
Dayton Bombers	64	35	23	6	76	282	270
Nashville Knights	64	36	25	3	75	312	305
Erie Panthers	64	35	25	4	74	305	307
Louisville Icehawks	64	30	27	7	67	302	293
Birmingham Bulls	64	30	29	5	65	290	313
Columbus Chill	64	30	30	4	64	257	256
Knoxville Cherokees	64	19	39	6	44	212	323

== Riley Cup playoffs ==
=== Bracket ===
1st Round
E.4	Johnstown	1
E.5	Richmond	0
W.4	Erie	1
E.6	Greensboro	0

Quarterfinals
E.1	Wheeling	3
E.4	Johnstown	1
E.2	Hampton Roads	1
E.3	Raleigh	3
W.2	Dayton	0
W.3	Nashville	3
W.1	Toledo	3
W.4	Erie	1

Semifinals
E.1	Wheeling	4
E.3	Raleigh	2
W.3	Nashville	2
W.1	Toledo	4

Finals
E.1	Wheeling	2
W.1	Toledo	4

- E. is short for East Division
- W. is short for West Division

=== 1st round ===
Richmond vs. Johnstown: Away / Home; Richmond 4 / Johnstown 5 / OT; Johnstown wins series 1–0	Greensboro vs. Erie: Away / Home; Greensboro 2 / Erie 6; Erie wins series 1–0

=== Quarterfinals ===
Johnstown vs. Wheeling
Away	Home
Johnstown 2	Wheeling 3
Johnstown 3	Wheeling 4
Wheeling 1	Johnstown 4
Wheeling 5	Johnstown 0
Wheeling wins series 3–1

Erie vs. Toledo
Away	Home
Erie 3	Toledo 6
Erie 2	Toledo 5
Toledo 6	Erie 9
Toledo 6	Erie 2
Toledo wins series 3–1

Hampton Roads vs. Raleigh
Away	Home	
Raleigh 2	Hampton Roads 3	OT
Raleigh 2	Hampton Roads 1	OT
Hampton Roads 4	Raleigh 5	OT
Hampton Roads 3	Raleigh 4	OT
Raleigh wins series 3–1

Nashville vs. Dayton
Away	Home	
Nashville 4	Dayton 3	OT
Nashville 4	Dayton 3	OT
Dayton 3	Nashville 5	
Nashville wins series 3–0

=== Semifinals ===
Raleigh vs. Wheeling
Away	Home	
Wheeling 2	Raleigh 3	OT
Wheeling 2	Raleigh 5	
Raleigh 4	Wheeling 7	
Raleigh 4	Wheeling 5	OT
Raleigh 3	Wheeling 5	
Wheeling 3	Raleigh 0	
Wheeling wins Series 4–2

Nashville vs. Toledo
Away	Home	
Nashville 1	Toledo 3	
Nashville 4	Toledo 7	
Toledo 3	Nashville 4	OT
Toledo 2	Nashville 3	
Nashville 2	Toledo 8	
Toledo 9	Nashville 5	
Toledo wins Series 4–2

=== Riley Cup finals ===
Toledo vs. Wheeling
Away	Home	
Toledo 3	Wheeling 5	
Toledo 3	Wheeling 7	
Wheeling 3	Toledo 4	
Wheeling 5	Toledo 7	
Toledo 4	Wheeling 2	
Wheeling 6	Toledo 7	OT
Toledo wins Series and Riley Cup 4–2

== ECHL awards ==
Jack Riley Cup:	Toledo Storm
Henry Brabham Cup:	Wheeling Thunderbirds
John Brophy Award:	Kurt Kleinendorst (Raleigh)
ECHL Most Valuable Player:	Trevor Jobe (Nashville)
Riley Cup Playoffs Most Valuable Player:	Rick Judson (Toledo)
ECHL Rookie of the Year:	Joe Flanagan (Birmingham)
Defenseman of the Year:	Derek Booth (Toledo)
Leading Scorer:	Trevor Jobe (Nashville)

== See also ==
- ECHL All-Star Game
- Kelly Cup
- List of ECHL seasons
- 1992 in sports
- 1993 in sports
