= 1994–95 ECHL season =

Ice hockey league season

The 1994–95 ECHL season was the seventh season of the ECHL. Before the season started, the Huntsville Blast moved their operations from Huntsville, AL to Tallahassee, FL and became the Tallahassee Tiger Sharks and the Louisville IceHawks suspended operations. The Wheeling Thunderbirds finished first overall in the regular season and the Richmond Renegades won their first Riley Cup, defeating the Greensboro Monarchs four games to one.

League history was made on March 18, 1995 at the Norfolk Scope when Hampton Roads Admirals goaltender Corwin Saurdiff became the first goalie to score a goal against the Charlotte Checkers.

== Regular season ==
Note: GP = Games played, W = Wins, L = Losses, T = Ties, Pts = Points, GF = Goals for, GA = Goals against, Green shade = Clinched playoff spot, Blue shade = Clinched division

East Division	GP	W	L	OTL	Pts	GF	GA
Richmond Renegades	68	41	20	7	89	271	232
Roanoke Express	68	39	19	10	88	255	223
Charlotte Checkers	68	37	22	9	83	274	261
Hampton Roads Admirals	68	37	23	8	82	255	239
Greensboro Monarchs	68	31	28	9	71	277	293
Raleigh IceCaps	68	23	39	6	52	239	295

North Division	GP	W	L	OTL	Pts	GF	GA
Wheeling Thunderbirds	68	46	17	5	97	313	243
Dayton Bombers	68	42	17	9	93	307	224
Toledo Storm	68	41	22	5	87	287	230
Columbus Chill	68	31	32	5	67	282	315
Johnstown Chiefs	68	31	32	5	67	256	297
Erie Panthers	68	18	46	4	40	256	356

West Division	GP	W	L	OTL	Pts	GF	GA
South Carolina Stingrays	68	42	19	7	91	255	215
Tallahassee Tiger Sharks	68	36	25	7	79	268	227
Nashville Knights	68	32	30	6	70	263	279
Knoxville Cherokees	68	30	30	8	68	241	267
Huntington Blizzard	68	28	37	3	59	224	275
Birmingham Bulls	68	26	38	4	56	273	325

== Riley Cup playoffs ==
=== Bracket ===
1st Round (Best of 5)
1	Wheeling	0
16	Birmingham	3
8	Hampton Roads	1
9	Tallahassee	3
5	Roanoke	3
12	Knoxville	1
4	Richmond	3
13	Columbus	0
3	South Carolina	3
14	Johnstown	2
6	Toledo	1
11	Nashville	3
7	Charlotte	0
10	Greensboro	3
2	Dayton	3
15	Huntington	1

Quarterfinals (Best of 5)
16	Birmingham	1
9	Tallahassee	3
5	Roanoke	1
4	Richmond	3
3	South Carolina	1
11	Nashville	3
10	Greensboro	3
2	Dayton	2

Semifinals (Best of 5)
9	Tallahassee	2
4	Richmond	3
11	Nashville	2
10	Greensboro	3

Riley Cup Finals (Best of 7)
4	Richmond	4
10	Greensboro	1

=== First round ===
Wheeling vs. Birmingham
Date	Away	Home
March 24	Birmingham 4	Wheeling 3
March 26	Birmingham 9	Wheeling 4
March 28	Wheeling 2	Birmingham 7
Birmingham wins series 3–0

Hampton Roads vs. Tallahassee
Date	Away	Home	
March 24	Tallahassee 4	Hampton Roads 3	
March 25	Tallahassee 3	Hampton Roads 5	
March 28	Hampton Roads 2	Tallahassee 3	OT
March 29	Hampton Roads 0	Tallahassee 2	
Tallahassee wins series 3–1

Roanoke vs. Knoxville
Date	Away	Home	
March 23	Knoxville 1	Roanoke 6	
March 25	Knoxville 6	Roanoke 3	
March 26	Roanoke 2	Knoxville 1	OT
March 27	Roanoke 5	Knoxville 4	OT
Roanoke wins series 3–1

Richmond vs. Columbus
Date	Away	Home	
March 24	Columbus 4	Richmond 10	
March 25	Columbus 8	Richmond 9	OT
March 27	Richmond 6	Columbus 1	
Richmond wins series 3–0

South Carolina vs. Johnstown
Date	Away	Home	
March 23	Johnstown 6	South Carolina 5	OT
March 25	Johnstown 1	South Carolina 6	
March 28	South Carolina 4	Johnstown 3	
March 29	South Carolina 5	Johnstown 7	
March 31	Johnstown 3	South Carolina 5	
South Carolina wins series 3–2

Toledo vs. Nashville
Date	Away	Home
March 23	Nashville 3	Toledo 6
March 24	Nashville 2	Toledo 1
March 25	Toledo 1	Nashville 3
March 26	Toledo 2	Nashville 4
Nashville wins series 3–1

Charlotte vs. Greensboro
Date	Away	Home	
March 25	Greensboro 3	Charlotte 2	
March 26	Greensboro 4	Charlotte 3	
March 28	Charlotte 4	Greensboro 5	OT
Greensboro wins series 3–0

Dayton vs. Huntington
Date	Away	Home
March 24	Huntington 3	Dayton 2
March 25	Huntington 4	Dayton 5
March 28	Dayton 3	Huntington 2
March 29	Dayton 5	Huntington 3
Dayton wins series 3–1

=== Quarterfinals ===
Tallahassee vs. Birmingham
Date	Away	Home	
March 31	Birmingham 5	Tallahassee 4	OT
April 1	Birmingham 3	Tallahassee 4	
April 7	Tallahassee 5	Birmingham 4	
April 8	Tallahassee 4	Birmingham 3	
Tallahassee wins series 3–1

Richmond vs. Roanoke
Date	Away	Home
March 31	Roanoke 3	Richmond 4
April 1	Roanoke 0	Richmond 4
April 5	Richmond 0	Roanoke 3
April 7	Richmond 6	Roanoke 1
Richmond wins series 3–1

South Carolina vs. Nashville
Date	Away	Home	
April 2	Nashville 2	South Carolina 3	OT
April 4	Nashville 7	South Carolina 4	
April 7	South Carolina 2	Nashville 5	
April 8	South Carolina 2	Nashville 4	
Nashville wins series 3–1

Dayton vs. Greensboro
Date	Away	Home	
April 1	Greensboro 0	Dayton 11	
April 2	Greensboro 6	Dayton 3	
April 4	Dayton 2	Greensboro 3	OT
April 5	Dayton 6	Greensboro 5	OT
April 8	Greensboro 5	Dayton 4	
Greensboro wins series 3–2

=== Semifinals ===
Richmond vs. Tallahassee
Date	Away	Home
April 12	Tallahassee 3	Richmond 7
April 14	Tallahassee 7	Richmond 4
April 16	Richmond 3	Tallahassee 2
April 19	Richmond 1	Tallahassee 3
April 20	Tallahassee 0	Richmond 4
Richmond wins series 3–2

Greensboro vs. Nashville
Date	Away	Home	
April 13	Nashville 5	Greensboro 6	
April 15	Nashville 6	Greensboro 8	
April 17	Greensboro 3	Nashville 8	
April 19	Greensboro 4	Nashville 5	OT
April 20	Nashville 1	Greensboro 2	OT
Greensboro wins series 3–2

=== Riley Cup finals ===
Kelly Cup Finals Richmond vs. Greensboro
Date	Away	Home
April 24	Greensboro 4	Richmond 6
April 25	Greensboro 1	Richmond 3
April 27	Richmond 0	Greensboro 3
April 29	Richmond 6	Greensboro 0
May 1	Greensboro 2	Richmond 3
Richmond wins series 4–1

== ECHL awards ==
Jack Riley Cup:	Richmond Renegades
Henry Brabham Cup:	Wheeling Thunderbirds
John Brophy Award:	Jim Playfair (Dayton)
ECHL Most Valuable Player:	Vadim Slivchenko (Wheeling)
Riley Cup Playoffs Most Valuable Player:	Blaine Moore (Richmond)
ECHL Goaltender of the Year:	Chris Gordon (Huntington)
ECHL Rookie of the Year:	Kevin McKinnon (Erie)
Defenseman of the Year:	Brandon Smith (Dayton)
Leading Scorer:	Scott Burfoot (Erie)

== See also ==
- ECHL All-Star Game
- Kelly Cup
- List of ECHL seasons
- 1994 in sports
- 1995 in sports
