= Jason Saal =

American ice hockey player

- Born: February 1, 1975 (age 51) Detroit, Michigan, U.S.
- Height: 5 ft 10 in (178 cm)
- Weight: 185 lb (84 kg; 13 st 3 lb)
- Position: Goaltender
- Shot: Left
- Played for: AHL Teams; St. John's Maple Leafs; Portland Pirates
- NHL draft: 5th round, 117th overall, 1993; Los Angeles Kings
- Playing career: 1992–2006

Jason Saal (born February 1, 1975) is an American former professional ice hockey player, with the majority of his career spent in the East Coast Hockey League (ECHL). He spent his entire career as a journeyman, also playing in the Ontario Hockey League, American Hockey League and United Hockey League. Although he was drafted by the Los Angeles Kings in the 5th round (117 overall), he never played an NHL game.

Saal retired following the 2004–05 season to be closer to his family and spend more time with his daughter. Saal returned to the Detroit area to become a police officer. Saal did return to professional hockey the following season playing 56 games with the Flint Generals in the UHL before finishing the year with the Adirondack Frostbite before fully retiring in 2006.

His biggest career accomplishment was winning the 1995 Hap Emms Memorial Trophy, which is given to the top goaltender of the Memorial Cup tournament. In 2018, he was elected into the ECHL Hall of Fame.
