= Louisiana IceGators (ECHL) =

Defunct minor professional ice hockey team

- City: Lafayette, Louisiana
- League: ECHL
- Operated: 1995–2005
- Home arena: Cajundome
- Colors: green, black, white

Championships
- Regular season titles: 2 (1997–98, 2001–02)
- Division titles: 8 (1995–96, 1997–98, 1998–99, 1999–2000, 2000–01, 2001–02, 2002–03, 2003–04)
- Conference titles: 2 (1996–97, 1999–2000)
- Kelly Cups: None

The Louisiana IceGators were an ECHL team based in Lafayette, Louisiana, from 1995 until the end of the 2004–05 season. The team played its home games at the Cajundome and were last an affiliate of the National Hockey League's Minnesota Wild and the American Hockey League's Houston Aeros.

== History ==
The team holds the top four regular-season average attendance numbers in ECHL history: 11,433 in 1996-97, 11,196 in 1997-98, 9,857 in 1998-99 and 9,776 in 1995-96. The IceGators also hosted the eighth-largest and nine of the 10 largest postseason crowds in ECHL history, including four capacity crowds of 11,800 in 1997. The team won division titles in eight of its ten seasons.

The team never won an ECHL championship, and toward the end of its existence attendance dropped. The 2004–05 season was plagued with team financial issues; drops in attendance led the Cajundome to no longer allow seating in the 300 level seats. The final game only had an attendance of only 4,228. In January 2006, Cajundome officials announced that no investors had responded to a request for proposals that would have returned a hockey team to the dome for the 2006–07 season.

== Season-by-season records ==
Season	Division	GP	W	L	T	OTL	SOL	PTS	PCT	GF	GA	PIM	Coach	Playoffs
1995–96	South	70	43	21	0	6	0	92	0.657	312	261	2930	Doug Shedden	Lost in Round 1
1996–97	South	70	38	28	4	0	0	80	0.571	292	244	3099	Doug Shedden	Lost in Finals
1997–98	Southwest	70	43	17	10	0	0	96	0.686	298	232	2726	Doug Shedden	Lost in Round 3
1998–99	Southwest	70	46	18	6	0	0	98	0.700	297	205	2425	Doug Shedden	Lost in Round 2
1999–00	Southwest	70	43	18	0	9	0	95	0.679	281	241	2177	Don Murdoch	Lost in Finals
2000–01	Southwest	72	42	24	6	0	0	90	0.625	237	209	1989	Dave Farrish	Lost in Round 4
2001–02	Southwest	72	56	12	4	0	0	116	0.806	261	156	1683	Dave Farrish	Lost in Round 2
2002–03	Southwest	72	40	20	12	0	0	92	0.639	249	210	2292	Dave Farrish	Lost in Round 2
2003–04	Central	72	48	22	2	0	0	98	0.681	235	167	1629	Dave Farrish	Lost in Round 2
2004–05	South	72	26	40	6	0	0	58	0.403	192	266	1549	Todd Gordon	Did not qualify

=== Playoffs results ===
- 1995–96: Lost to Jacksonville 3-2 in first round.
- 1996–97: Defeated Mobile 3-0 in first round; defeated Birmingham 3-2 in quarterfinals; defeated Peoria 3-1 in semifinals; lost to South Carolina 4-1 in finals.
- 1997–98: Defeated Mobile 3-0 in first round; defeated Pee Dee 3-0 in quarterfinals; lost to Pensacola 4-2 in semifinals.
- 1998–99: Lost to New Orleans 3-2 in first round.
- 1999–00: Defeated Mississippi 3-1 in first round; defeated South Carolina 3-0 in quarterfinals; defeated Greenville 4-2 in semifinals; lost to Peoria 4-2 in finals.
- 2000–01: Defeated New Orleans 3-2 in first round; defeated Pee Dee 3-2 in quarterfinals; lost to South Carolina 4-0 in semifinals.
- 2001–02: Lost to Jackson 3-2 in first round.
- 2002–03: Defeated Arkansas 3-0 in first round; lost to Mississippi 3-0 in quarterfinals.
- 2003–04: Defeated Pensacola 3-2 in first round; lost to Gwinnett 3-1 in quarterfinals.
- 2004–05: Did not qualify.

== IceGators records ==
=== Team records ===
- Most Points, One Season – 116 (56-12-4, 2001–02)
- Best Points Percentage, One Season – .806 (56-12-4, 2001–02)
- Most Wins, One Season – 56 (2001–02)
- Most Home Wins, One Season – 30 (2001–02)
- Most Road Wins, One Season – 26 (2001–02)
- Fewest Home Losses, One Season – 2 (2001–02)
- Longest Winning Streak, One Season – 14 (November 23, 2001 - December 22, 2001)
- Most Shorthand Goals, One Season – 24 (1998–99)
- Most 30-Or-More Goal Scorers, One Season – 5 (1998–99)

(John Varga, 39; John Spoltore, 36; Don Parsons; 34, Mike Murray, 31; Louis Dumont, 30)

- Fewest Goals Against, One Season – 156 (2001–02)
- Lowest Goals Against Average, One Season – 2.17 (2001–02, 156 goals in 72 games)
- Longest Overtime Playoff Games
  - 121:24, Louisiana at Greenville, May 5, 2000 (Greenville won 3-2 at 1:24 of the fourth overtime)
  - 115:19, Jackson at Louisiana, April 5, 2002 (Jackson won 5-4 at 15:19 of the third overtime)
- Most Penalty Minutes, One Team, One Series (Since 91-92) – 355 (Louisiana IceGators vs. Pensacola, 1998)
- Most Penalty Minutes, One Team, One Playoff Game – 168 (Louisiana IceGators vs. Pensacola, April 30, 1998)
- Most Road Playoff Wins – 21

=== Individual records ===
- Most Shorthand Goals, Season – 11 (Jay Murphy, 1998–99)
- Most Power-Play Goals, Defenseman, Season – 16 (Chris Valicevic, 1995–96)
- Highest Assists-Per-Game Average, Career – 1.15 (John Spoltore, 1995-2001)

(among players with 200 or more assists)

- Most 100-Or-More Point Seasons – 4 (John Spoltore, 1995-2001)
- Most Consecutive 100-Or-More Point Seasons – 3 (John Spoltore, 1997-2000)
- Most Penalty Minutes, Season – 512 (Rob McCaig, 1995–96)
- Most Shutouts By A Goaltender, Season – 7 (Frederic Cloutier, 2001–02)
- Lowest Goals-Against Average By A Goaltender, Season – 1.84 (Frederic Cloutier, 2001–02)
- Highest Save Percentage By A Goaltender, Season – .945 (Frederic Cloutier, 2001–02)
- Most Assists In Playoffs, Career – 69 (John Spoltore, 1996-2001)
- Most Assists, One Playoff Year – 26 (John Spoltore, 2000)
- Most Points, One Playoff Year – 34 (John Spoltore, 2000)
- Most All-Star Games Played – 7 (Chris Valicevic, 1994, 1996–2001)

=== Attendance records ===
- All-Time Regular Season Average Attendance
  - 11,433 (1996–97)
  - 11,196 (1997–98)
  - 9,857 (1998–99)
  - 9,776 (1995–96)
- Regular Season Total Attendance
  - 401,185 (1996–97)
  - 391,826 (1997–98)
  - 345,003 (1998–99)
  - 342,154 (1995–96)
- Highest Attendance, ECHL All-Star Game – 11,493 (January 20, 1998)
- All-Time Attendance, Playoff Game
  - 11,800 (South Carolina at Louisiana, Kelly Cup Finals, May 11, 1997)
  - 11,800 (South Carolina at Louisiana, Kelly Cup Finals, May 9, 1997)
  - 11,800 (South Carolina at Louisiana, Kelly Cup Finals, May 7, 1997)
  - 11,800 (Peoria at Louisiana, Kelly Cup Semi-Finals, April 28, 1997)
  - 11,754 (Mobile at Louisiana, Kelly Cup 1st Round, April 6, 1997)
  - 11,042 (Jacksonville at Louisiana, Riley Cup 1st Round, April 5, 1996)
  - 10,460 (Pensacola at Louisiana, Southern Conference Finals, April 25, 1998)
  - 10,220 (Mobile at Louisiana, Kelly Cup 1st Round, April 2, 1996)
