= Greenville Grrrowl =

Defunct minor professional ice hockey team

- City: Greenville, South Carolina
- League: ECHL
- Operated: 1998–2006
- Home arena: BI-LO Center
- Colors: Black, gold, purple, silver

Championships
- Regular season titles: None
- Division titles: 1 (2001–02)
- Conference titles: 1 (2001–02)
- Kelly Cups: 1 (2001–02)

The Greenville Grrrowl were an ECHL hockey team located in Greenville, South Carolina. They played their home games at the BI-LO Center. In the 2001–02 season, they won the Kelly Cup.

The Grrrowl's initial season was 1998–99, with former Chicago Blackhawks defensive star John Marks as their coach. He remained their only coach from 1998 to 2006. They were an affiliate of the AHL Norfolk Admirals, and an affiliate of the NHL Chicago Blackhawks and the Edmonton Oilers.

The team announced that it was folding on June 2, 2006, after running a US$1,000,000 deficit during 2005 that left the team unable to attract new investors. They began losing money after attendance slid from 7,000 per game in their first season to just 2,100 in 2004-05. On June 15, the BI-LO Center announced they were willing to pay $350,000 to keep the team afloat, hoping to entice developers to save the team. Despite the offer, the Grrrowl ceased operations on July 10, 2006 when the team failed to find new sources of financing. According to Grrrowl president Ed Rubinstein, the team only plans to refund "some percentage" of money already paid by season ticket holders.

Hockey returned to Greenville after a four-year absence when the Johnstown Chiefs relocated and became the Greenville Road Warriors in 2010.

== Playoffs ==
- 1998–99: Did not qualify.
- 1999–00: Defeated Mobile 3-2 in first round; defeated Augusta 3-1 in quarterfinals; lost to Louisiana 4-2 in semifinals.
- 2000–01: Did not qualify.
- 2001–02: Defeated Florida 3-2 in first round; defeated Pee Dee 3-1 in quarterfinals; defeated Mississippi 3-1 in semifinals; defeated Dayton 4-0 to win championship.
- 2002–03: Defeated Florida 1-0 in first round; lost to Columbia 3-0 in second round.
- 2003–04: Did not qualify.
- 2004–05: Defeated Pensacola 3-1 in first round; lost to Florida 3-0 in quarterfinals.
- 2005–06: Defeated Augusta 2-0 in first round; lost to Florida 3-1 in second round.

== Retired numbers ==
- 36 – Nick Vitucci retired in 2004. Nick played in 14 ECHL seasons, his last three with the Greenville Grrrowl. He later became the head coach for the Toledo Walleye.

== Notable NHL alumni ==
List of Greenville Grrrowl alumni who played more than 25 games in Greenville and 25 or more games in the National Hockey League.

- Krys Barch
- Alex Burrows
- Simon Gamache
- Mike Morrison
- Martin St. Pierre
- Tim Sestito

Preceded by South Carolina Stingrays	Kelly Cup Champions; 2001-02	Succeeded by Atlantic City Boardwalk Bullies
