= Tallahassee Tiger Sharks =

- City: Tallahassee, Florida
- League: ECHL
- Founded: 1981 (In the CHL)
- Operated: 1994–2001
- Home arena: Tallahassee-Leon County Civic Center
- Head coach: Terry Christensen (1994–1998, 1999–2000); Jeff Brubaker (1998–1999); Gerry Fleming (2000–2001)

Franchise history
- 1981–1983: Nashville South Stars
- 1983–1990: Virginia Lancers
- 1990–1992: Roanoke Valley Rebels
- 1992–1993: Roanoke Valley Rampage
- 1993–1994: Huntsville Blast
- 1994–2001: Tallahassee Tiger Sharks
- 2001–2002: Macon Whoopee
- 2002–2003: Lexington Men O' War
- 2005–2026: Utah Grizzlies
- 2026-present: Trenton Ironhawks

The Tallahassee Tiger Sharks were a minor league professional ice hockey team that played in Tallahassee, Florida, from 1994 to 2001 as members of the East Coast Hockey League. The Tiger Sharks home rink was the Tallahassee-Leon County Civic Center. While in Tallahassee, the franchise was affiliated with the NHL's New York Islanders, Florida Panthers, and Montreal Canadiens. Since the loss of the Tiger Sharks franchise, several attempts have been made by local residents to bring ice hockey back to Tallahassee. Thus far, none of these efforts have been successful.

== Franchise history ==
The franchise started in 1981 as the Nashville South Stars in Nashville, Tennessee, in the Central Hockey League. Henry Brabham then took over the team in 1983 and relocated it mid-season to Vinton, Virginia, to become the Virginia Lancers. Brabham and the Lancers were then one of the founding members of the East Coast Hockey League (ECHL) in 1988. Brabham sold the team to Larry Revo in 1992. The franchise remained in Vinton until 1993 when it relocated to Huntsville, Alabama, as the Huntsville Blast for one season. The team was not doing well and Revo was forced to turn the team over to the league and a group known as the Huntsville Hockey Inc. took over management of the team. In May 1994, the team was sold by Revo to Elmore Sports Group, which then relocated the team to Tallahassee.

In 1994, the Huntsville franchise relocated to Tallahassee and became the Tiger Sharks. The team adopted a new color scheme of black and gray, with white as an official accent color. Terry Christensen was named head coach of the Tiger Sharks, a position he held for five of the team's seven seasons in Tallahassee. The Tiger Sharks qualified for the playoffs in each of its first three seasons. Christensen left the organization to coach the Miami Matadors hockey club in 1998. At the start of the 1998–99 ECHL season, the color scheme was changed to red, white, and black. Jeff Brubaker, a former NHL enforcer who won the ECHL's Riley Cup as the coach of the Greensboro Monarchs, coached the team during the 1998–99 season. Following the folding of the Miami Matadors after one season, Christensen returned to coach the Tiger Sharks again for the 1999–2000 season. During the 2000–01 season, the Tiger Sharks were coached by Gerry Fleming, a former enforcer who spent ten years with the Fredericton Canadiens as both a player and as an assistant coach. During the 2000–01 season, the team was in position to qualify for the playoffs after missing in the previous three seasons, but was penalized $50,000 and 15 points in the standings for violating the team salary cap and making improper payments to NHL and AHL teams to get assigned players. After the conclusion of the 2000–01 season, the franchise was relocated to Macon, Georgia.

== Playoffs ==
- 1994–95: Defeated Hampton Roads 3–1 in first round; defeated Birmingham 3–1 in quarterfinals; lost to Richmond 3–2 in semifinals.
- 1995–96: Defeated Raleigh 3–1 in first round; defeated Richmond 3–1 in quarterfinals; lost to Charlotte 3–1 in semifinals.
- 1996–97: Lost to Pensacola 3–0 in first round.
- 1997–98: Did not qualify.
- 1998–99: Did not qualify.
- 1999–00: Did not qualify.
- 2000–01: Did not qualify.

== Mascot ==
The Tiger Sharks' mascot was an ice-skating 6-foot-tall (1.8 m) gray tiger shark named Frenzy. Frenzy was immensely popular among Tiger Sharks fans (and Tallahasseans in general).

== Notable NHL alumni ==
List of Tallahassee Tiger Sharks alumni who played more than 25 games in Tallahassee and 25 or more games in the National Hockey League.

- Kimbi Daniels
- Ben Guite
- Todd Reirden
