= Mississippi Sea Wolves =

Defunct minor professional ice hockey team

- City: Biloxi, Mississippi
- League: ECHL
- Division: Continental
- Founded: 1996
- Operated: 1996–2009
- Home arena: Mississippi Coast Coliseum
- Colors: Red, blue, and white
- Website: mississippiseawolves.com

Championships
- Regular season titles: 2002–03
- Division titles: 2002–03
- Kelly Cups: 1998–99

The Mississippi Sea Wolves were a professional hockey team based in Biloxi, Mississippi, and played in the Mississippi Coast Coliseum. The Sea Wolves were members of the ECHL.

The Sea Wolves were founded in 1996 and had considerable success over their 10 seasons in the ECHL. They reached the playoffs in five of their first seven years and a league championship in 1999, when they defeated the Richmond Renegades in a best-of-seven series to claim the Kelly Cup.

Damages from Hurricane Katrina to the Mississippi Coast Coliseum forced the team to suspend operations for the 2005–06 and 2006–07 seasons under the ECHL's hardship provisions. Hurricane Katrina resulted in extensive damage to the team’s home arena, including flood damage to team offices, locker rooms, ice-making equipment, and two Zambonis. During the 2006–07 ECHL All-Star Game, the league officially confirmed the Sea Wolves would return in 2007–08.

On March 30, 2009, the Sea Wolves announced that the organization would be suspending operations again for the 2009–10 season, but a little more than a month later the team's management announced that professional hockey would continue to be played on the Mississippi Gulf Coast in the form of the Mississippi Surge in the Southern Professional Hockey League. The Surge played at the Coast Coliseum from the 2009–10 season through 2013–14.

In 2021, the Federal Prospects Hockey League hosted three neutral site games in Biloxi. Biloxi Pro Hockey sold 20,163 tickets in the month of December and an announcement was made on December 30 that a new Sea Wolves team would return in 2022. The new team began play in the 2022–23 FPHL season.

== History ==
League champions	Division champions	Playoff berth

ECHL
Season	Division	Regular season							Statistics			Postseason results	Coach
Season	Division	W	L	T	OTL	SOL	Pts	Pct.	GF	GA	PIM	Postseason results	Coach
1996–97	South	34	26	10	—	—	78	.557	241	245	2082	Lost First Round, 0–3 vs. Birmingham	Bruce Boudreau
1997–98	Southwest	34	27	9	—	—	77	.550	225	224	1909	did not qualify	Bruce Boudreau
1998–99	Southwest	41	22	7	—	—	89	.636	251	215	1357	Won Conf. Quarterfinals, 3–0 vs. South Carolina; Won Conf. Semifinals, 3–0 vs. Florida; Won Conf. Finals, 4–1 vs. Pee Dee; Won Kelly Cup, 4–3 vs. Richmond	Bruce Boudreau
1999–00	Southwest	35	27	8	—	—	78	.557	241	221	1773	Won Wildcard, 2–1 vs. Pensacola; Lost Conf. Quarterfinals, 1–3 vs. Louisiana	Marc Potvin
2000–01	Southwest	34	33	5	—	—	73	.507	221	218	1310	did not qualify	Al Pedersen
2001–02	Southwest	41	26	5	—	—	87	.604	251	232	1706	Won Div. Semifinals, 3–0 vs. Pensacola; Won Div. Finals, 3–0 vs. Jackson; Lost Conf. Finals, 1–3 vs. Greenville	Bob Woods
2002–03	Southwest	44	24	—	4	—	92	.639	250	211	2159	Won Div. Semifinals, 3–0 vs. Pensacola; Lost Div. Finals, 0–3 vs. Louisiana	Bob Woods
2003–04	Central	45	20	—	7	—	97	.674	256	200	1632	Lost Div. Semifinals, 2–3 vs. Gwinnett	Bob Woods
2004–05	South	39	24	—	4	5	87	.604	223	215	1372	Lost Conf. Quarterfinals, 1–3 vs. Gwinnett	Bob Woods
2005–06	Inactive due to arena damages from Hurricane Katrina												
2006–07	Inactive due to arena damages from Hurricane Katrina												
2007–08	South	29	40	—	1	2	61	.424	204	262	1462	Lost First Round, 1–3 vs. Texas	Steffon Walby
2008–09	South	28	35	—	7	1	64	.451	203	256	1242	did not qualify	Steffon Walby

Preceded by Hampton Roads Admirals	Kelly Cup Champions; 1998–99	Succeeded by Peoria Rivermen
