= Greensboro Generals =

- City: Greensboro, North Carolina
- League: East Coast Hockey League
- Division: Southern Division
- Founded: 1999
- Home arena: Greensboro Coliseum Complex

The Greensboro Generals were an East Coast Hockey League team based in Greensboro, North Carolina, and played at the Greensboro Coliseum from 1999 to 2004. The name was originally used by the Greensboro Generals in the Eastern Hockey League.

The ECHL Generals franchise replaced the Greensboro Monarchs in the city, which had played from 1989 until 1995 before the ownership bought an expansion franchise in the American Hockey League, called the Carolina Monarchs. Both the original Generals and ECHL Monarchs were considered as some of the first southern hockey franchises to build a loyal fan base and draw consistent attendance at their games.

In 1997, the AHL's Carolina Monarchs would fold after only two seasons as the Coliseum became host to the relocated Carolina Hurricanes of the National Hockey League. During that time, a new arena was being built for the NHL team in Raleigh, North Carolina, but would not open until 1999. Prior to the Hurricanes' arrival, the Coliseum was required to make vast improvements to the arena in order to satisfy NHL regulations. Among them were the addition of VIP Suites, a members only club area and upgrades to the ice surface and locker room facilities.

Following the Hurricanes' departure, local attorneys Art Donaldson and James Roscetti entered into negotiations with the East Coast Hockey League to secure a franchise for Greensboro. Donaldson and Roscetti were awarded a franchise in July 1999 and had only three months to put together a front office, coaching staff and team. Donaldson and Roscetti decided to bring attention to the franchise right away by hiring former popular ECHL Monarchs' coach Jeff Brubaker as head coach and general manager for their inaugural season. The ECHL would return to Greensboro with the Greensboro Gargoyles in 2025.

== Season-by-season record ==
Season	GP	W	L	SOL	Pts	GF	GA	PIM	Coach	Playoffs
1999–00	70	20	43	7	47	229	337	2129	Jeff Brubaker	Did not qualify
2000–01	72	26	39	7	59	215	277	1738	Jeff Brubaker	Did not qualify
2001–02	72	23	41	8	54	188	278	2055	Graeme Townshend, Alexander Godynyuk	Did not qualify
2002–03	72	42	21	9	93	235	211	1619	Rick Adduono	Lost in Division Finals
2003–04	72	40	30	2	82	241	240	1503	Rick Adduono	Did not qualify
