= Henry Brabham =

American ice hockey businessman (1929–2020)

- Born: April 29, 1929
- Died: March 30, 2020 (aged 90); Vinton, Virginia, U.S.
- Occupations: Former mayor of Vinton, Former minor league hockey franchise owner: Roanoke Valley Rebels (1975–1976); Virginia Raiders (1982–1983); Virginia Lancers (1983–1989); Erie Panthers (1988–1991); Johnstown Chiefs (1988–1993)
- Title: ECHL co-founder
- Awards: ECHL Hall of Fame (2008)

Henry Brabham IV (April 29, 1929 – March 30, 2020) was a founder of the ECHL, formerly known as the East Coast Hockey League. In 2008, he was inducted into the inaugural class of the ECHL Hall of Fame. The Brabham Cup, first awarded in 1989, is an ECHL award for the team that finishes with the best regular season record.

He bought the Salem Raiders of the Atlantic Coast Hockey League in 1982 and renamed them the Virginia Raiders. He failed to get a long-term lease with the Salem Civic Center, so he disbanded the Raiders after the 1982–83 season. The ACHL then convinced Brabham to take over the Nashville South Stars during the following season, which he relocated back to Salem in December 1983 as the Virginia Lancers, named after his chain of convenience stores. In 1984, he built the LancerLot Sports Complex in his hometown of Vinton, Virginia, to serve as home to the Lancers due to the cost of playing in the Salem Civic Center.

In 1988, Brabham and Bill Coffey founded the East Coast Hockey League (ECHL) as a minor professional ice hockey league with five teams, three of which were owned by Brabham — the Erie Panthers, Johnstown Chiefs, and the Virginia Lancers — as well as being a co-founder of a fourth team, the Knoxville Cherokees. He sold the Lancers in 1989, the Panthers in 1991, and the Chiefs in 1993. The ECHL has since become a development league for the National Hockey League.

The LancerLot's roof caved in during the 1993 Storm of the Century and the ice rink was destroyed. Brabham sold the complex in 2018.

Brabham died on March 30, 2020, at the age of 90.
