= Ontario Reign (ECHL) =

Defunct minor professional ice hockey team

- City: Ontario, California
- League: ECHL
- Conference: Western
- Division: Pacific
- Founded: 1993
- Operated: 2008–2015
- Home arena: Toyota Arena
- Colors: Navy blue, orange, silver, white
- Affiliates: Los Angeles Kings; Winnipeg Jets

Franchise history
- 1993–2000: Huntington Blizzard
- 2003–2008: Texas Wildcatters
- 2008–2015: Ontario Reign
- 2015–2019: Manchester Monarchs

Championships
- Division titles: 4 (2008–09, 2011–12, 2012–13, 2014–15)

The Ontario Reign were a professional ice hockey team from Ontario, California that played in the ECHL. Their home arena was the then Citizens Business Bank Arena. They were affiliated with two National Hockey League teams: the Los Angeles Kings were the team's primary affiliate, and the Winnipeg Jets were the secondary affiliate. In 2015, the franchise moved to Manchester, New Hampshire, to become the Manchester Monarchs while the Monarchs of the American Hockey League (AHL) then moved to California to become the new Ontario Reign as part of the AHL's plan to create a Pacific Division.

== Team history ==
=== Huntington Blizzard/Texas Wildcatters years and becoming the Reign ===
The Reign started as the Huntington Blizzard in 1993. After the 1999–2000 season, the team went dormant until 2003, when new owners bought the team and moved it to Beaumont, Texas as the Texas Wildcatters. The team played as the Wildcatters until they were unable to secure an arena lease in Beaumont in 2008. On February 26, 2008, the team announced its plan to relocate to Ontario for the 2008–09 season and became the Ontario Reign. The team's logo was unveiled on March 17, 2008.

=== Ontario Reign ===
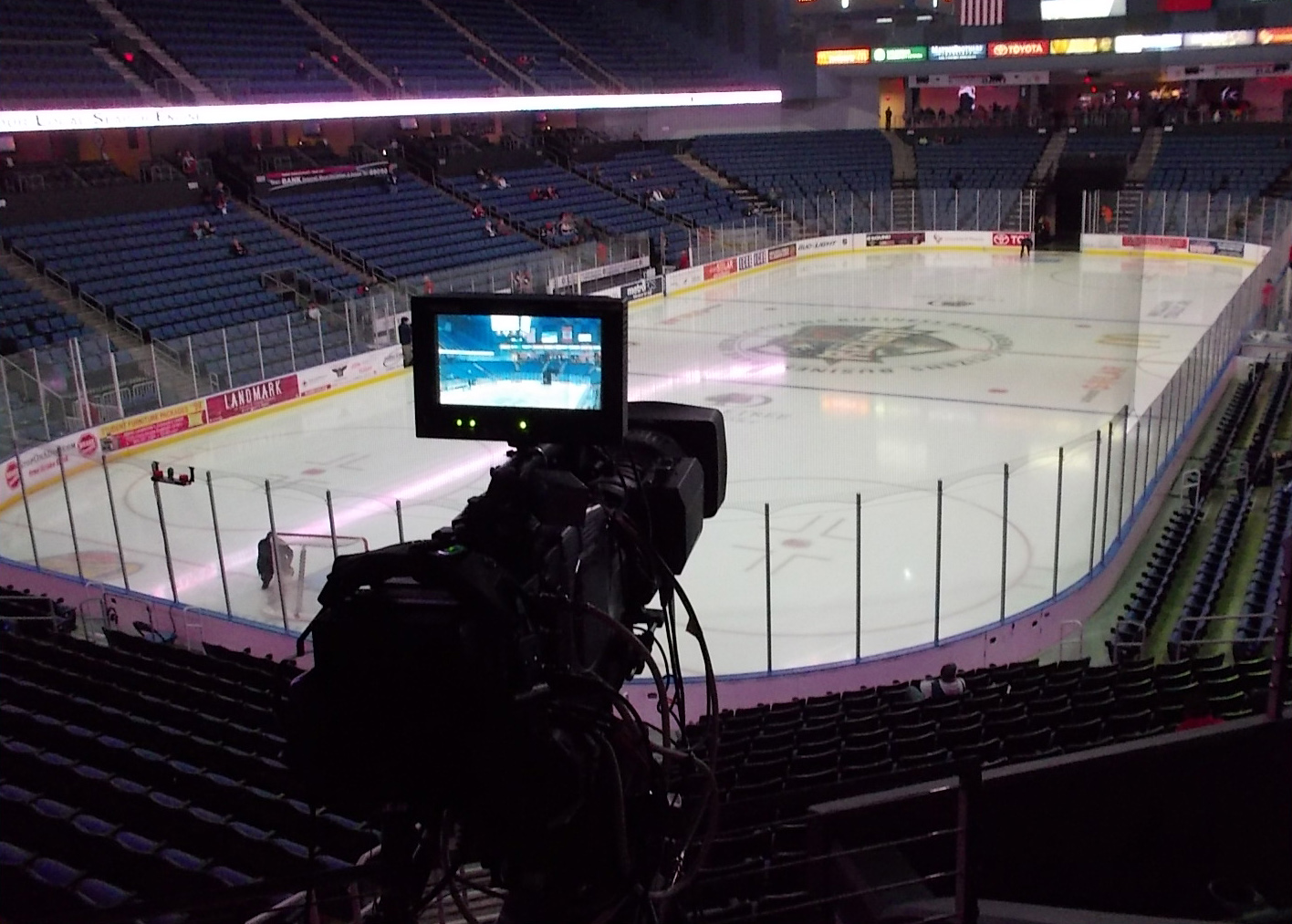
Citizens Business Bank Arena pre-game ice in February 2013

During the 2008–09 regular season, the Reign went 38-29-4-2 and captured the 2008–09 Pacific Division championship. However, their success was short lived as they lost in round one of the playoffs to the Stockton Thunder. Head Coach Karl Taylor finished second in the John Brophy Award balloting for ECHL Coach of the Year, losing to Trenton Titans' head coach Rick Kowalsky. The Reign had a total attendance of 210,801 at 36 home games, an average of 5,856 per game, making it second-highest in the league. Kyle Kraemer lead the franchise in goals scored for the Reign.

During the 2009–10 regular season, the Reign went 31-31-3-7 and despite being a playoff contender until almost the last regular season game, they were unable to secure a playoff berth. The Reign had a total attendance of 232,223 at 36 home games, an average of 6,451 per game and over 10% higher than the previous season. This was more than enough to capture the league attendance record for the season.

In the 2010–11 regular season, the Reign went a dismal 27-39-2-4, including losing their first 15 home games. The season was marred by numerous injuries, illnesses, trades and a few players defecting to European hockey leagues. Despite their hopes for a late-season recovery, they were never a playoff contender and missed the playoffs for the second straight year. Despite their poor season on the ice, the attendance at 36 home games was an amazing 240,596, an average of 6,683 per game and over 3% higher than the previous season. For the second straight season, the Reign captured the league attendance record despite the poor on-ice performance.

Head coach Karl Taylor, who had been with the franchise since its inaugural year in Ontario, signed with the Chicago Wolves of the AHL as an assistant coach. He left Ontario with a 96-99-22 record. On August 23, 2011, the Reign announced that Jason Christie would succeed Taylor as head coach for the 2011–12 season. On August 24, 2011, the team announced that Christie would be joined behind the bench by former Los Angeles Kings defenseman and assistant coach Mark Hardy. The Reign finished the 2011–12 season with a franchise-best 43-21-5-3 record and clinched their second Pacific Division title.

== Team name ==
The name was derived from an abstract noun related to royalty. Its name follows the pattern the Kings have established with the AHL affiliate the Manchester Monarchs. The name was chosen from a contest held by the team's website, where over 600 entries were submitted. Mike Brewster of Fontana, California submitted the winning entry.

== Players ==
List of Ontario Reign alumni who played over 25 games in the ECHL and 25 or more games in the National Hockey League.

- Jean-François Bérubé
- Michael Hutchinson
- Paul Mara
- Jeff Zatkoff
