= Texas Wildcatters =

Defunct minor professional ice hockey team

- City: Beaumont, Texas
- League: ECHL
- Conference: American Conference
- Division: South Division
- Founded: 1993
- Home arena: Ford Arena
- Colors: Black and gold
- General manager: Richard W. Adams
- Head coach: Malcom Cameron
- Affiliates: Florida Panthers; Minnesota Wild

Franchise history
- 1993–2000: Huntington Blizzard
- 2003–2008: Texas Wildcatters
- 2008–2015: Ontario Reign
- 2015–2019: Manchester Monarchs

Championships
- Division titles: 2007–08

The Texas Wildcatters, who took their name from Texas wildcatters, were a professional minor league ice hockey team in the ECHL based in Beaumont, Texas. They played their home games at the Ford Arena. The franchise previously played in Huntington, West Virginia, from 1993 to 2000 as the Huntington Blizzard playing at the Huntington Civic Arena.

The Wildcatters relocated to Ontario, California, and were renamed Ontario Reign. The franchise's last game as the Wildcatters was a 1–4 loss to the Columbia Inferno on April 25, 2008, at Ford Arena.

== History ==
During the 2004–05 season, they were affiliated with the Florida Panthers and the San Antonio Rampage.

On October 7, 2005, the Jefferson County, Texas, Commissioners announced that the team would not be allowed to use Ford Arena for the 2005–06 season because the site was being used for Hurricane Rita relief. There was no suitable temporary facility in the area, forcing the Wildcatters to cancel the season. They resumed play in 2006–07 as affiliates of the Minnesota Wild of the NHL and the AHL's Houston Aeros. After the 2007–08 season, the team moved to Ontario, California as the Ontario Reign and affiliated with the Los Angeles Kings.

According to a Beaumont TV report, there was a local group attempting to secure a Central Hockey League (CHL) franchise for Beaumont in time for the 2008–09 season. After the Austin Ice Bats suspended operations, there was an attempt to move that franchise to Ford Arena for 2008–09. However, there was insufficient time to do this before the CHL needed a commitment to play.

== Season records ==
=== Regular season ===
Season	Games	Won	Lost	Tied	OTL	SOL	Points	Goals for	Goals against	Standing
2003–04	72	22	44	6	—	—	50	196	287	7th, Central
2004–05	72	17	44	11	—	—	45	178	260	6th, South
2005–06	Involuntary suspension of season due to Hurricane Rita									
2006–07	72	41	22	—	5	4	91	265	222	2nd, South
2007–08	72	52	9	—	4	7	115	266	177	1st, South

=== Playoffs ===
Season	1st round	2nd round	3rd round	Finals
2003–04	Did not qualify			
2004–05	Did not qualify			
2005–06	Involuntary suspension of season			
2006–07	—	W, 3–2, GWT	L, 2–4, FLA	—
2007–08	W, 3–1, MIS	L, 2–3, CBA	—	—
