= Mobile Mysticks =

Ice hockey team

- City: Mobile, Alabama
- League: ECHL
- Operated: 1995–2002
- Home arena: Mobile Civic Center
- Colors: Purple, gold, green

Franchise history
- 1995–2002: Mobile Mysticks
- 2003–2015: Gwinnett Gladiators
- 2015–present: Atlanta Gladiators

The Mobile Mysticks were a professional minor league ice hockey team based in Mobile, Alabama that played in the ECHL. They played their home games at the Mobile Civic Center. The team was founded in 1995 as an expansion franchise, joining the ECHL alongside the Louisville RiverFrogs and the Louisiana IceGators. The Mysticks owed their name to the prevalence of mystic societies—social organizations responsible for throwing parades and balls during the Carnival season—that existed in Mobile since the early 18th century.

The Mysticks qualified for the Kelly Cup playoffs for five out of their seven seasons, but never advanced past the second round. In 2002, the franchise suspended operations and moved to Duluth, Georgia for the 2003–04 season. Originally the Gwinnett Gladiators, the team changed its name to the Atlanta Gladiators in 2015.

== Franchise history ==
The Mobile Mysticks began play in the ECHL as an expansion franchise for the 1995–96 season under head coach and former NHL player Eddie Johnstone. During this time, they served as a minor league affiliate for the NHL's Philadelphia Flyers and the AHL's Hershey Bears.

Following a rough start (the Mysticks finished seventh in their division and did not qualify for the playoffs their inaugural year; the following year they finished fourth in their division and were eliminated from the playoffs in a first-round sweep by the Louisiana IceGators) the Mysticks decided against renewing Johnstone's contract. His replacement, Matt Shaw, led Mobile to a fifth-place divisional finish and another first-round loss, again in a three-game sweep by the IceGators. Shaw did not return to the Mysticks for the following season.

Jeff Pyle joined the Mysticks as head coach for the 1998–99 season. With Pyle at the helm, the team saw postseason action for the next three seasons—losing in the 1999 preliminary round to the Birmingham Bulls; falling in the first round of the 2000 playoffs to the Greenville Grrrowl; and in their most successful playoff bid, falling in double overtime in the second round to the South Carolina Stingrays (the eventual Kelly Cup champions) in 2001. The Mysticks failed to qualify for the playoffs in 2002, and the franchise suspended operations, eventually moving to Duluth, Georgia, in 2003 to become the Gwinnett Gladiators (branded as the Atlanta Gladiators since the 2015–16 ECHL season).

== Season-by-season record ==
Records as of 2001–02 season.

=== Regular season ===
Season	Games	Won	Lost	Tied	OTL	SOL	Points	Goals for	Goals against	Standing	Average attendance
1995–96	70	22	37	11	—	—	55	265	325	7th, South	5,310
1996–97	70	34	25	11	—	—	79	257	263	4th, South	4,917
1997–98	70	35	27	8	—	—	78	236	233	5th, Southwest	4,558
1998–99	70	31	31	8	—	—	70	231	259	5th, Southwest	3,874
1999–00	70	40	28	2	—	—	82	275	230	2nd, Southwest	4,177
2000–01	72	38	28	6	—	—	82	240	233	3rd, Southwest	3,542
2001–02	72	28	26	18	—	—	74	215	237	6th, Southwest	2,618

=== Playoffs ===
Season	Prelim	1st round	2nd round	3rd round	Finals
1995–96	Out of playoffs				
1996–97	—	L, 0–3, LOU	—	—	—
1997–98	—	L, 0–3, LOU	—	—	—
1998–99	L, 0–2, BIR	—	—	—	—
1999–00	—	L, 2–3, GRN	—	—	—
2000–01	—	W, 3–2, JAC	L, 3–2, SC	—	—
2001–02	Out of playoffs				
