= Hampton Roads Admirals =

Defunct minor professional ice hockey team

- City: Norfolk, Virginia
- League: ECHL
- Founded: 1989
- Operated: 1989–2000
- Home arena: Norfolk Scope
- Colors: Blue, Gold, White
- Affiliates: Washington Capitals (NHL) Portland Pirates (AHL)

Franchise history
- 1989–2000: Hampton Roads Admirals
- 2001–2004: Columbus Cottonmouths
- never played: Gulf Coast Swords

Championships
- Regular season titles: None
- Division titles: 1991, 1994
- Kelly Cups: 1991, 1992, 1998

The Hampton Roads Admirals were a professional ice hockey team in the East Coast Hockey League (ECHL). They played in Norfolk, Virginia at the Norfolk Scope Arena from 1989 until 2000, when the owners purchased an expansion American Hockey League franchise that became the Norfolk Admirals. In 2015, the AHL Admirals were relocated and the ECHL returned to Norfolk with the current Norfolk Admirals.

== Expansion ==
One-time Chicago Cubs and National League executive Blake Cullen was looking to expand into the Norfolk area for hockey. He arranged an exhibition game between the Virginia Lancers and the Carolina Thunderbirds (originally listed as the Carolina Cougars) to take place at the Norfolk Scope. Cullen said that he "would be happy with 3,000 fans and 4,000 or more would be very encouraging. " The game, played on a Wednesday night between a fourth and fifth place team, drew over 6,200 fans. Because of the turnout, the ECHL was willing to offer Cullen a new franchise for free. However, when a group of five businessmen offered the league $25,000 for territorial rights, Commissioner Pat Kelly told Cullen that he "was a man of his word" and offered the franchise to him for the same price, in which Cullen accepted.

A naming contest would be held in the summer of 1989. Bettie Ann denDekker would win the contest with the name "Admirals".

== Inaugural Season ==
The Hampton Roads Admirals were introduced for the 1989-90 season and developed a rivalry with the Virginia Lancers of Vinton, Virginia throughout the season. The Admirals provided "attention and credibility to the ECHL by drawing an average of 5,885 fans in their inaugural season. Until the Admirals joined the league, owners considered 2,000 fans to be "a good crowd. They would make the post-season in their first season, going 29-29-2 before losing to the Erie Panthers three games to two in a five game series of the opening round of the Riley Cup playoffs. The credibility also caught the attention of two NHL teams: the Detroit Red Wings and the Washington Capitals. Detroit agreed to send eight prospects, while the Washington Capitals agreed to sending a goaltender and an unspecified number of players.

== Championships ==
The Admirals were the flagship franchise of the ECHL, having won Jack Riley Cups in 1991 and 1992, and the Patrick J. Kelly Cup in 1998. The three championships won by the franchise is matched only by the Alaska Aces, and the South Carolina Stingrays. The Florida Everblades have since won 5 Kelly Cups with their most recent after the 2025-26 season. Two years later, the Admirals moved up to the American Hockey League (AHL).

== Season-by-season record ==
Season	Div.	GP	W	L	T	OTL	Pts	Pct	GF	GA	PIM	Coach	Playoff Results
1989-90	East	60	29	29	0	2	60	0.483	252	267	1902	John Brophy	Lost in round 1
1990-91	East	64	38	20	0	6	82	0.594	300	248	2131	John Brophy	Won Championship
1991-92	East	64	42	20	0	2	86	0.656	298	220	2097	John Brophy	Won Championship
1992-93	East	64	37	21	0	6	80	0.578	294	235	2441	John Brophy	Lost in round 1
1993-94	East	68	41	19	0	8	90	0.603	298	246	2272	John Brophy	Lost in round 2
1994-95	East	68	37	23	0	8	82	0.544	255	239	2522	John Brophy	Lost in round 1
1995-96	East	70	32	25	0	13	77	0.457	278	265	2756	John Brophy	Lost in round 1
1996-97	East	70	46	19	5	0	97	0.693	286	223	2256	John Brophy	Lost in round 2
1997-98	Northeast	70	32	28	10	0	74	0.529	222	225	1902	John Brophy	Won Championship
1998-99	Northeast	70	38	24	8	0	84	0.600	215	213	2147	John Brophy	Lost in round 2
1999-2000	Northeast	70	44	22	0	4	92	0.629	241	198	2189	John Brophy	Lost in round 3

== Playoffs ==
- 1989–90: Lost to Erie 3-2 in quarterfinals.
- 1990–91: Defeated Richmond 3-1 in quarterfinals; defeated Johnstown 4-1 in semifinals; defeated Greensboro 4-1 to win championship.
- 1991–92: Defeated Raleigh 3-1 in first round; defeated Richmond 2-0 in quarterfinals; defeated Greensboro 3-1 in semifinals; defeated Louisville 4-0 to win championship.
- 1992–93: Lost to Raleigh 3-1 in quarterfinals.
- 1993–94: Defeated South Carolina 2-1 in first round; lost to Wheeling 3-1 in quarterfinals.
- 1994–95: Lost to Tallahassee 3-1 in first round.
- 1995–96: Lost to Richmond 3-0 in first round.
- 1996–97: Defeated Roanoke 3-1 in first round; lost to South Carolina 3-2 in quarterfinals.
- 1997–98: Defeated Peoria 3-0 in first round; defeated Roanoke 3-2 in quarterfinals; defeated Wheeling 4-2 in semifinals; defeated Pensacola 4-2 to win championship.
- 1998–99: Lost to Richmond 3-1 in first round.
- 1999–00: Defeated Huntington 3-2 in first round; lost to Trenton 3-2 in quarterfinals.

== Team records ==
Record	Number	Player	Year
Goals (Season)	55	Brian Martin	1990–91
Assists (Season)	82	Murray Hood	1990–91
Points (Season)	118	Victor Gervais	1992–93
Penalty minutes (Season)	354	Aaron Downey	1995–96
GAA (Season)	2.55	Jan Lasak	1999–2000
SV% (Season)	.917 (tie)	Jason Saal	1998–99
SV% (Season)	.917 (tie)	Jan Lasak	1999–2000
Goals (Career)	312	Rod Taylor	1991–2000
Assists (Career)	282	Victor Gervais	1990–98
Points (Career)	565	Rod Taylor	1990–98
Penalty minutes (Career)	856	Rod Taylor	1990–98
Wins (Career)	62	Mark Bernard	1990–96
Shutouts (Career)	5	Mark Bernard	1990–96
Games (Career)	528	Rod Taylor	1991–2000

== Notable players ==
List of Hampton Roads Admirals alumni who played over 25 games in the ECHL and 25 or more games in the National Hockey League.

- (Canada) Serge Aubin
- (Canada) Aaron Downey
- (Germany) Olaf Kolzig
- (Canada) Patrick Lalime
- (Canada) Steve Poapst
- (Canada) Stephen Valiquette

Preceded by Greensboro Monarchs	Riley Cup Champions; 1990–91, 1991–92	Succeeded by Toledo Storm
Preceded by South Carolina Stingrays	Kelly Cup Champions; 1997–98	Succeeded by Mississippi Sea Wolves
