= Richmond Renegades =

- City: Richmond, Virginia
- League: ECHL
- Conference: American Conference
- Division: Northeast Division
- Founded: 1990
- Operated: 1990–2003
- Home arena: Richmond Coliseum
- Colors: Teal, black, purple (1993–2003)
- Owner(s): Allan Harvie
- Affiliates: New York Islanders (1990–1994); Hartford Whalers (1994–1997); Carolina Hurricanes (1997–1998); San Jose Sharks (1998–1999); Washington Capitals (2000–2003)

Franchise history
- 1990–2003: Richmond Renegades

Championships
- Regular season titles: 1 (1995–96)
- Division titles: 2 (1994–95, 1995–96)
- Conference titles: 1 1998–99
- Kelly Cups: 1 (1994–95)

The Richmond Renegades were a professional ice hockey team in Richmond, Virginia that played in the East Coast Hockey League from 1990 until 2003. The Renegades played at the Richmond Coliseum, which they marketed in later years as the Freezer.

The Renegades folded in 2003, but were succeeded by the Richmond RiverDogs of the United Hockey League.

== History ==
In their 13 seasons, the Renegades won the Riley Cup as league champion in the 1994–95 season, the Brabham Cup in 1995–96 as regular season champion, and the Northern Conference championship in 1998–99. In the 1999 Kelly Cup Finals they blew a 3–1 series lead to the Mississippi Sea Wolves. The Renegades' rivals for most of their existence were the Hampton Roads Admirals, based in Norfolk, Virginia.

The Richmond Renegades name was revived by a new SPHL franchise that played from 2006–2009, owned by original ECHL Renegades owner Allan Harvie.

Allan Harvie founded the team, which he sold to Elmore Sports Group in 1993. The team was then sold, in 1994, to CCF Sports Group, an investment group owned by bankers, Joe Carney, Brian Cohn and Harry Feuerstein. The team folded in 2003.

== Playoffs ==
- 1990–91: Lost to Hampton Roads 3–1 in quarterfinals.
- 1991–92: Defeated Winston-Salem 3–2 in first round; lost to Hampton Roads 2–0 in quarterfinals.
- 1992–93: Lost to Johnstown 1–0 in first round.
- 1993–94: Did not qualify
- 1994–95: Defeated Columbus 3–0 in first round; defeated Roanoke 3–1 in quarterfinals; defeated Tallahassee 3–2 in semifinals; defeated Greensboro 4–1 to win championship.
- 1995–96: Defeated Hampton Roads 3–0 in first round; lost to Jacksonville 3–1 in quarterfinals.
- 1996–97: Defeated Dayton 3–1 in first round; lost to Peoria 3–1 in quarterfinals.
- 1997–98: Did not qualify.
- 1998–99: Defeated Hampton Roads 3–1 in first round; defeated Toledo 3–0 in quarterfinals; defeated Roanoke 4–0 in semifinals; lost to Mississippi 4–3 in finals.
- 1999–00: Lost to Trenton 3–0 in first round.
- 2000–01: Lost to Peoria 3–1 in first round.
- 2001–02: Did not qualify.
- 2002–03: Did not qualify.

== Notable personnel ==
- Krys Barch – played for Renegades in 2001–02. He went on to play over 300 games in the National Hockey League with the Dallas Stars, Florida Panthers, and New Jersey Devils.
- Frank Bialowas – played for Renegades in 1992–93. Bialowas later played for the Toronto Maple Leafs in 1993–94.
- Andy Bezeau – played for Renegades in 1991–92. Later recorded the second highest penalty minute total in IHL history (590 PIM) during the 1995–96 season as a member of the Fort Wayne Komets.
- Brad Church – former Washington Capitals first round draft pick in 1995, 17th overall. Church would play for the Renegades from 2001 to 2003 and would later go on to coach the Phoenix Roadrunners of the ECHL.
- Trevor Jobe – former ECHL record holder for most goals scored and most points scored. He played 34 games as a member of the Renegades during the 1991–92 ECHL season.
- Ryan Kraft – former Sharks draft pick spent two seasons with the Renegades (1998–2000) and would later play seven games with the Sharks during the 2002–03 season.
- Rod Langway – Stanley Cup-winning, Hall Of Fame defenseman who briefly came out of retirement in 1995 after a sixteen-year NHL career where he skated for the Montreal Canadiens and Washington Capitals. Langway joined the team late in the season and played 6 regular season games along with 9 post season games. Langway would later become a familiar sight on the bench, as he joined the team as an assistant coach the following season, and would later come back to help as an assistant coach from 1998 to 2000.
- Rod Taylor – The long-time Hampton Roads Admirals forward joined the team in 2000 after the Admirals suspended ECHL operations and became home to an AHL team. Taylor broke the ECHL goal-scoring record that was once held by former Renegade Trevor Jobe on December 29, 2000.
- Manny Legace - Played for the Renegades during the 1996-97 season. He played for many teams throughout his NHL career, including the Los Angeles Kings and the Detroit Red Wings, the latter of whom he won a Stanley Cup with in 2002. Towards the end of his career, he played for the St. Louis Blues and Carolina Hurricanes. Legace currently serves as the goaltending coach for the Columbus Blue Jackets.

Preceded by Toledo Storm	Riley Cup Champions; 1994–95	Succeeded by Charlotte Checkers
