= List of Winnipeg Jets head coaches =

The Winnipeg Jets are a Canadian professional ice hockey team based in Winnipeg, Manitoba. They play in the Central Division of the Western Conference in the National Hockey League (NHL). The team joined the WHA in 1972, then moved to the NHL in 1979 following the NHL–WHA merger. The Jets were deactivated in 1996 after its assets relocated to Phoenix to become the Phoenix (later Arizona) Coyotes. In 1999, the NHL added the Atlanta Thrashers as an expansion team, but moved to Winnipeg, Manitoba in 2011, readopting the Jets name and branding. In 2026, the original Jets' franchise records and statistics from 1972 to 1996 were consolidated with the current Jets franchise. The Jets play their home games at the Canada Life Centre. They are owned by True North Sports & Entertainment, Kevin Cheveldayoff is their general manager, and Adam Lowry is the team captain.

Paul Maurice has the most wins of any head coach in Jets history with 315, and coached the most games in franchise history with 601.

== Key ==
#	Number of coaches^{[a]}
GC	Games coached
W	Wins = 2 points
L	Losses = 0 points
T	Ties = 1 point
OT	Overtime/shootout losses = 1 point^{[b]}
PTS	Points
Win%	Winning percentage

== Coaches ==
Note: Statistics are correct through the 2025–26 season.

#	Name	Term^{[c]}	Regular season						Playoffs				Achievements	Reference
#	Name	Term^{[c]}	GC	W	L	T/OT	PTS	Win%	GC	W	L	Win%	Achievements	Reference
1	Bobby Hull*	1972–1974	156	77	70	9	163	.522	18	9	9	.500		
2	Rudy Pilous†	1974–1975	37	18	17	2	38	.514	—	—	—	—		
—	Bobby Hull*	1975	13	4	9	0	8	.308	—	—	—	—		
—	Rudy Pilous†	1975	28	16	9	3	35	.625	—	—	—	—		
3	Bobby Kromm	1975–1977	161	98	59	4	200	.621	33	23	10	.697	Robert Schmertz Memorial Trophy winner (1976); Avco World Trophy championship (1976)	
4	Larry Hillman*	1977–1979	141	78	55	8	164	.582	9	8	1	.889	Avco World Trophy championship (1978)	
5	Tom McVie	1979–1980	96	30	55	11	71	.370	10	8	2	.800	Avco World Trophy championship (1979)	
6	Bill Sutherland*	1980	3	2	1	0	4	.666	—	—	—	—		
—	Tom McVie	1980	28	1	20	7	9	.161	—	—	—	—		
—	Bill Sutherland*	1980–1981	29	6	20	3	15	.259	—	—	—	—		
7	Mike Smith*	1981	23	2	17	4	8	.174	—	—	—	—		
8	Tom Watt	1981–1983	181	72	85	24	168	.464	7	1	6	.143		
9	Barry Long*	1983–1986	205	87	93	25	199	.485	11	3	8	.273		
10	John Ferguson*	1986	14	7	6	1	15	.536	3	0	3	.000		
11	Dan Maloney	1986–1989	212	91	93	28	210	.495	15	5	10	.333		
12	Rick Bowness	1989	28	8	17	3	19	.339	—	—	—	—		
13	Bob Murdoch	1989–1991	160	63	75	22	148	.463	7	3	4	.429		
14	John Paddock	1991–1995	281	106	138	37	249	.443	13	5	8	.385		
15	Terry Simpson	1995–1996	97	43	47	7	93	.479	6	2	4	.333		
16	Claude Noel	2011–2014	177	80	79	18	178	.503	—	—	—	—		
17	Paul Maurice	2014–2021	601	315	224	62	692	.576	39	16	23	.410		
18	Dave Lowry	2021–2022	54	26	22	6	58	.537	—	—	—	—		
—	Rick Bowness	2022–2024	164	98	57	9	205	.625	10	2	8	.200		
19	Scott Arniel	2024–present	164	91	57	16	198	.611	13	6	7	.461	Presidents' Trophy (2024–25)	

== Notes ==
- ^{a} A running total of the number of coaches of the Jets. Thus, any coach who has two or more separate terms as head coach is only counted once.
- ^{b} Before the 2005–06 season, the NHL instituted a penalty shootout for regular season games that remained tied after a five-minute overtime period, which prevented ties.
- ^{c} Each year is linked to an article about that particular NHL season.
