= Maurice Filion Trophy =

The Maurice Filion Trophy is awarded annually to the general manager of the Year in the Quebec Maritimes Junior Hockey League. It was first awarded in 2005–06.

== Winners ==
| Season | General Manager | Team |
|---|---|---|
| 2005–06 | Ted Nolan | Moncton Wildcats |
| 2006–07 | Pascal Vincent | Cape Breton Screaming Eagles |
| 2007–08 | Jacques Beaulieu | Saint John Sea Dogs |
| 2008–09 | Dominic Ricard | Drummondville Voltigeurs |
| 2009–10 | Dominic Ricard | Drummondville Voltigeurs |
| 2010–11 | Mike Kelly | Saint John Sea Dogs |
| 2011–12 | Joël Bouchard | Blainville-Boisbriand Armada |
| 2012–13 | Philippe Boucher | Rimouski Océanic |
| 2013–14 | Steve Ahern | Baie-Comeau Drakkar |
| 2014–15 | Martin Moudou | Shawinigan Cataractes |
| 2015–16 | Gilles Bouchard | Rouyn-Noranda Huskies |
| 2016–17 | Joël Bouchard | Blainville-Boisbriand Armada |
| 2017–18 | Serge Beausoleil | Rimouski Océanic |
| 2018–19 | Mario Pouliot | Rouyn-Noranda Huskies |
| 2019–20 | Jocelyn Thibault | Sherbrooke Phoenix |
| 2020–21 | Jim Hulton | Charlottetown Islanders |
| 2021–22 | Patrick Roy | Quebec Remparts |
| 2022–23 | Stéphane Julien | Sherbrooke Phoenix |
| 2023–24 | Jean-François Grégoire | Baie-Comeau Drakkar |
| 2024–25 | Olivier Picard | Blainville-Boisbriand Armada |
| 2025–26 | Yanick Jean | Chicoutimi Saguenéens |
