= Paul Maurice =

Canadian ice hockey player and coach (born 1967)

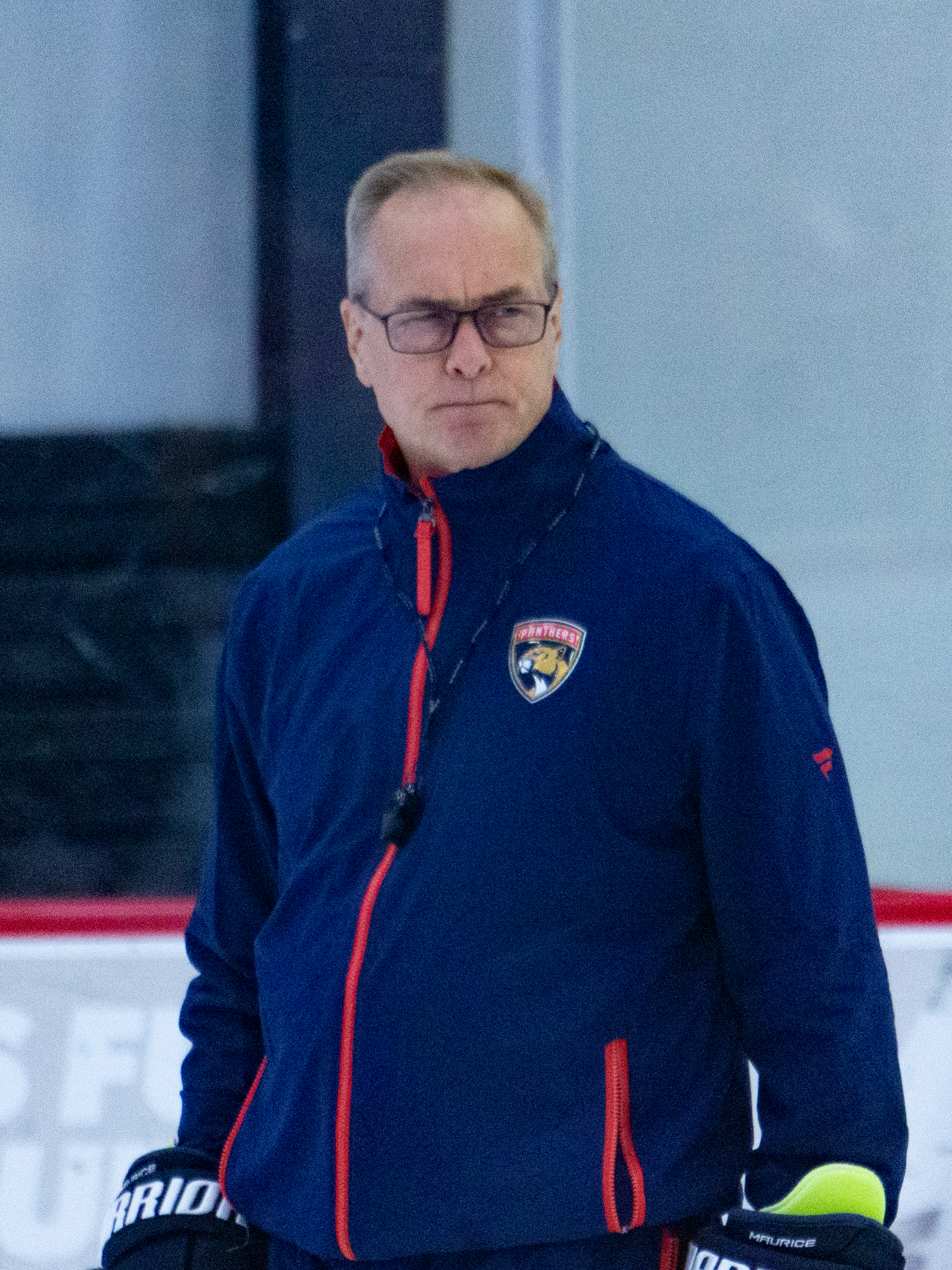
- Maurice with the Florida Panthers in 2024
- Born: January 30, 1967 (age 59) Sault Ste. Marie, Ontario, Canada
- Current NHL coach: Florida Panthers
- Coached for: Hartford Whalers; Carolina Hurricanes; Toronto Maple Leafs; Winnipeg Jets
- Coaching career: 1988–present

Paul Maurice (born January 30, 1967) is a Canadian professional ice hockey coach and former player who is the head coach for the Florida Panthers of the National Hockey League (NHL). At age 43, Maurice became the youngest coach in NHL history to coach 1,000 games, reaching the milestone on November 28, 2010. He and Scotty Bowman are the only head coaches to have coached in at least 2,000 NHL games.

Maurice played four years of junior ice hockey as a defenceman in the Ontario Hockey League (OHL) prior to suffering an eye injury. Maurice started his NHL coaching career with the Hartford Whalers/Carolina Hurricanes franchise from 1995 to 2003 and the Toronto Maple Leafs from 2006 to 2008. On December 3, 2008, Maurice was rehired by the Hurricanes after the firing of Peter Laviolette, who had replaced him in 2003. On November 28, 2011, the Carolina Hurricanes announced that Maurice had been fired for a second time, whereupon, after a brief stint coaching Metallurg Magnitogorsk in the Kontinental Hockey League (KHL), he joined the Winnipeg Jets in January 2014. After his resignation from the Jets in December 2021, Maurice was named head coach of the Florida Panthers in June 2022, and led the Panthers to three consecutive appearances in the 2023, 2024 and 2025 Stanley Cup Finals. On June 24, 2024, Maurice coached the Panthers to the team's first Stanley Cup championship, winning the series in seven games against the Edmonton Oilers. He did so in his 26th season as head coach, the most seasons coached for a first-time champion. On June 17, 2025, Maurice coached the Panthers to their second consecutive Stanley Cup championship, winning the series in six games against the Edmonton Oilers in a rematch of the 2024 Stanley Cup Final.

== Playing career ==
=== Windsor Spitfires (1984–1988) ===
Maurice began playing with the Windsor Spitfires of the Ontario Hockey League (OHL) in 1984–85, appearing in 38 games with the club and earning three assists. He was held off the scoresheet in four playoff games, as Windsor was swept by the London Knights in the first round. After his rookie season, Maurice was selected by the Philadelphia Flyers in the 12th round, 252nd overall, in the 1985 NHL entry draft, which was the final selection of that year's draft.

Maurice saw increased playing time with the Spitfires in 1985–86, playing in 56 games, scoring three goals and 13 points and helping the club reach the postseason once again. In 16 playoff games, Maurice had two assists as Windsor eventually lost in the Emms Division finals to the Guelph Platers in six games.

Maurice continued to improve as a player with Windsor in the 1986–87 season, as he appeared in 63 games, scoring four goals and 19 points. The Spitfires qualified for the postseason again, and in 14 games, Maurice had two goals and three points as Windsor lost to the North Bay Centennials in the division finals.

Maurice began the 1987–88 season playing with the Spitfires, and in 32 games, he had a goal and five points. As a result of his eye injury, he still has a blind spot and suffers fuzziness on the right side of his vision. When goaltender Pat Jablonski was sent down to the Spitfires by the NHL's St. Louis Blues, the club was forced to vacate a spot on the team to accommodate him. Singled out, Maurice was given the option by team owner Peter Karmanos to be traded or to become an assistant coach with the team. Choosing the latter, Maurice retired from playing and focused his career on coaching.

=== Career statistics ===
			Regular season					Playoffs
Season	Team	League	GP	G	A	Pts	PIM	GP	G	A	Pts	PIM
1984–85	Windsor Compuware Spitfires	OHL	38	0	3	3	47	4	0	0	0	19
1985–86	Windsor Compuware Spitfires	OHL	56	3	10	13	89	16	0	2	2	8
1986–87	Windsor Compuware Spitfires	OHL	63	4	15	19	87	14	2	1	3	18
1987–88	Windsor Compuware Spitfires	OHL	32	1	4	5	33	—	—	—	—	—
OHL totals			189	8	32	40	256	34	2	3	5	55

== Coaching career ==
=== Windsor Spitfires (1987–1990) ===
Maurice began his coaching career as an assistant coach with the Spitfires after he retired as a player. He began working under head coach Tom Webster. The Spitfires finished the 1987–88 season with the best record in the league, going 50–14–2. In the playoffs, Windsor swept the Kitchener Rangers, Hamilton Steelhawks and Peterborough Petes to win the J. Ross Robertson Cup and earn a berth in the 1988 Memorial Cup. In the round-robin portion of the tournament, the Spitfires went 3–0, outscoring the opposition 18–9, and clinched a position in the Memorial Cup final. In the final game, the Spitfires were upset by the Medicine Hat Tigers, losing 7–6.

Maurice spent his first full season with the club in 1988–89, as the rebuilding club struggled to a 25–37–4 record, earning 54 points, however, the team reached the playoffs. In the first round of the postseason, the Spitfires were swept by the Niagara Falls Thunder in four games.

The rebuilding Spitfires had a new head coach for the 1989–90, as Tom Webster left to become the head coach of the Los Angeles Kings, and Brad Smith was hired to take his place. Windsor struggled to a 17–41–8 record, finishing in last place in the Emms Division, and failed to make the playoffs.

=== Detroit Compuware Ambassadors/Detroit Jr. Red Wings (1990–1995) ===
Maurice left his job as an assistant coach with the Spitfires in the summer of 1990, opting to join Peter Karmanos, who became the owner of the expansion team, the Detroit Compuware Ambassadors. Maurice was hired as an assistant coach under head coach Andy Weidenbach.

During their expansion season in 1990–91, the Ambassadors struggled to a record of 11–50–5, earning 27 points and finishing in last place in the Emms Division, failing to reach the playoffs.

The Ambassadors continued to struggle in 1991–92, as the club replaced Weidenbach midway through the season with Jim Rutherford. Detroit finished the year with a 23–42–1 record, a 20-point improvement over the previous season, and made the postseason for the first time in team history. In the postseason, the Ambassadors nearly upset the heavily favoured Niagara Falls Thunder, taking them to a seventh game, before ultimately losing.

In 1992–93, the Ambassadors renamed their team, becoming the Detroit Jr. Red Wings. Maurice remained an assistant, as the club hired Tom Webster, who had coached Maurice as a player with the Windsor Spitfires. Maurice also worked with Webster as an assistant coach with the Spitfires from 1988 until 1989. The Jr. Red Wings improved their record to 37–22–7, earning 81 points, and marked the first time in team history they finished over .500. In the playoffs, Detroit defeated the Guelph Storm and London Knights before losing in five games to the Sault Ste. Marie Greyhounds in the division finals.

The Jr. Red Wings promoted Maurice to head coach of the club in 1993–94, after Tom Webster was relieved of his duties due to a disagreement in team policies. Maurice hired Peter DeBoer as his assistant. Maurice and DeBoer were close friends and teammates whilst with the Windsor Spitfires. In his first season as head coach, Maurice led the Jr. Red Wings to the best record in the Emms Division, as Detroit went 42–20–4, earning a first round bye in the playoffs. Detroit then defeated the Owen Sound Platers and Sault Ste. Marie Greyhounds to earn a berth in the OHL finals against the North Bay Centennials. In the final round, the Centennials defeated the Jr. Red Wings in a tough seven-game series, winning the final game in overtime.

In 1994–95, the Jr. Red Wings improved their record once again, as the club went 44–18–4, earning 92 points, and first place in the west division, winning the Bumbacco Trophy. In the postseason, Detroit swept the London Knights, Peterborough Petes and Sudbury Wolves, earning their second-straight season of playing in the J. Ross Robertson Cup final. In the final round against the Guelph Storm, Detroit defeated the Storm in six games, winning the championship and earning a berth in the 1995 Memorial Cup. At the Memorial Cup, Detroit finished the round-robin portion of the tournament with a 2–1 record, setting up a semifinals match-up with the Brandon Wheat Kings. The Jr. Red Wings defeated Brandon 2–1, earning a place in the Memorial Cup final against the host team, the Kamloops Blazers. In the last game, the Blazers routed the Jr. Red Wings, winning 8–2.

=== Hartford Whalers/Carolina Hurricanes (1995–2003) ===
Maurice joined the Hartford Whalers, who were recently purchased by Detroit Jr. Red Wings owner Peter Karmanos, as an assistant coach under head coach Paul Holmgren. After the Whalers struggled to a 5–6–1 record to begin the season, the Whalers fired Holmgren and promoted Maurice to become the head coach. At the age of 28, Maurice became the second youngest coach in National Hockey League history, behind Gary Green, who was 26 when he took the helm of the Washington Capitals in 1979.

Maurice coached his first game on November 7, 1995, as the Whalers defeated the San Jose Sharks 7–3. Under Maurice, Hartford went 29–33–8, failing to qualify for the 1996 playoffs. In 1996–97, the Whalers continued to struggle, going 32–39–11, earning 75 points and finishing in tenth place in the Eastern Conference, two points out of the playoffs in the final season in Hartford.

The Whalers franchise moved to Raleigh, North Carolina, in 1997–98 and were renamed the Carolina Hurricanes; Maurice was retained as head coach of the club. The Hurricanes struggled in their first season after the relocation, going 33–41–8, finishing in last place in the Northeast Division and ninth in the Eastern Conference, missing the playoffs. In 1998–99, the Hurricanes moved to the newly created Southeast Division and finished the year with a 34–30–18 record, earning 86 points, which was good enough for their first playoff appearance since 1992, their first season with a winning record since 1990, and their first division title since 1987, and only their second as an NHL team. In the 1999 playoffs, the Hurricanes were the third seed in the Eastern Conference, despite having the eighth-best record in the East, setting up a first round series against the Boston Bruins. The Bruins defeated the Hurricanes in six games.

Carolina saw their point total decrease to 84 in 1999–2000, as the Hurricanes had a record of 37–35–10–0, finishing in ninth place in the Eastern Conference, failing to clinch a playoff berth. The Hurricanes returned to the postseason in 2000–01, finishing in eighth place in the Eastern Conference with a 38–32–9–3 record, earning 88 points. In the playoffs, the Hurricanes faced the heavily favoured New Jersey Devils and lost the series in six games.

The Hurricanes won their second division title since moving from Hartford in 2001–02, as the Hurricanes went 35–26–16–5, earning 91 points and entering as the third seed in the East in the playoffs. In the first round, the Hurricanes defeated the favoured New Jersey Devils in six games, followed by defeats of the Montreal Canadiens and Toronto Maple Leafs to win the Eastern Conference, setting up the Stanley Cup Final against the Detroit Red Wings, in which the Hurricanes lost in five games.

The Hurricanes struggled in the 2002–03 season, finishing with the worst record in the NHL, going 22–43–11–6, earning only 61 points and well out of the playoffs. Carolina continued to struggle at the start of the 2003–04, as 30 games in, the club had an 8–12–8–2 record. On December 15, 2003, the Hurricanes fired Maurice, replacing him with Peter Laviolette.

=== Toronto Marlies (2005–2006) ===
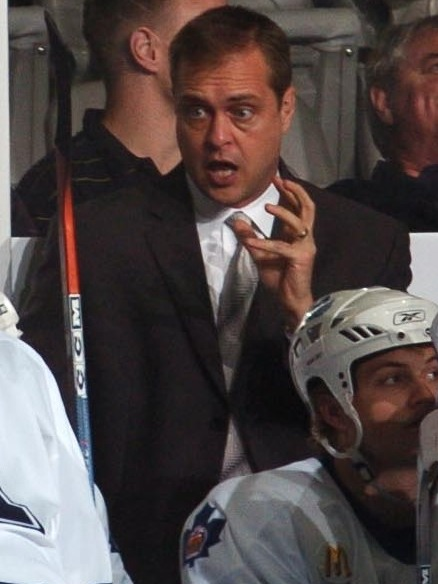
Maurice with the Marlies in 2005.

On June 24, 2005, Maurice was hired by the Toronto Maple Leafs to become the head coach of their American Hockey League (AHL) affiliate, the Toronto Marlies, for the 2005–06 season. With the Marlies, Maurice led the club into the playoffs with a 41–29–6–4 record, earning 92 points and fourth place in the North Division. In the postseason, the Marlies were swept by the Grand Rapids Griffins in the first round.

=== Toronto Maple Leafs (2006–2008) ===
Maurice became the head coach of the Maple Leafs in the 2006–07 season after the club failed to reach the playoffs in 2005–06 and relieved Pat Quinn from his duties. In his first season with the Leafs, Maurice led the club to a 40–31–11 record for 91 points, though the Leafs finished in ninth place in the Eastern Conference, missing out on a playoff position by a single point. Toronto struggled to a 36–35–11 record in 2007–08, as the team once again failed to make the playoffs.

On May 7, 2008, Maurice was fired from the Maple Leafs by interim general manager Cliff Fletcher.

=== Return to Carolina (2008–2011) ===
Maurice rejoined the Carolina Hurricanes on December 3, 2008, after the club fired head coach Peter Laviolette. At the time of the firing, the Hurricanes had a 12–11–2 record. Under Maurice, Carolina responded with a 33–19–5 record to finish the 2008–09 season with an overall 45–30–7 record, earning second place in the Southeast Division and sixth place in the East. In the playoffs, the Hurricanes defeated the New Jersey Devils and Boston Bruins, reaching the conference finals. In the third round against the Pittsburgh Penguins, however, the Hurricanes were swept as Pittsburgh eventually won the Stanley Cup.

Maurice and the Hurricanes struggled in 2009–10, as the club went 35–37–10, failing to reach the postseason. The club improved to a 40–31–11 record in 2010–11. However, Carolina again failed to make the playoffs, as the team finished in ninth place in the Conference. Carolina got off to a poor start in the 2011–12 season, as the team went 8–13–4 in their first 25 games. On November 28, 2011, the Hurricanes fired Maurice, replacing him with Kirk Muller.

=== Metallurg Magnitogorsk (2012–2013) ===
On June 8, 2012, Maurice was hired as head coach of Metallurg Magnitogorsk of the Kontinental Hockey League (KHL) for the 2012–13 season. Under Maurice, Magnitogorsk qualified for the postseason after a 27–13–12 regular season, earning fourth place in the Eastern Conference. In the playoffs, the club lost to Salavat Yulaev Ufa in seven games in the first round. After the season, Maurice returned to North America to be closer to his family.

=== Winnipeg Jets (2014–2021) ===
On January 12, 2014, the Winnipeg Jets hired Maurice as head coach, replacing the fired Claude Noël after the Jets struggled to a 19–23–5 start to the 2013–14 season. Under Maurice, the Jets had an 18–12–5 record. On April 16, 2014, Maurice signed a four-year extension with the club.

During the 2014–15 season, Maurice led the Winnipeg Jets to their first playoff appearance, since relocating from Atlanta, finishing with a franchise best 43–26–13, for 99 points. In the postseason, the Jets were swept by the Anaheim Ducks in the first round.

In 2015–16, the Jets struggled to a 35–39–8 record, earning only 78 points and finished in last place in the Central Division, failing to qualify for the playoffs.

On October 20, 2017, Maurice won his 600th game as an NHL head coach and became the 17th coach to achieve this feat.

In 2017–18, Maurice brought the Jets to the conference finals before losing to the Vegas Golden Knights 4–1.

On February 12, 2020, Maurice signed a multi-year contract extension with the Jets.

On December 17, 2021, Maurice resigned from his role as head coach of the Jets. Assistant coach Dave Lowry took over as interim head coach.

=== Florida Panthers (2022–present) ===
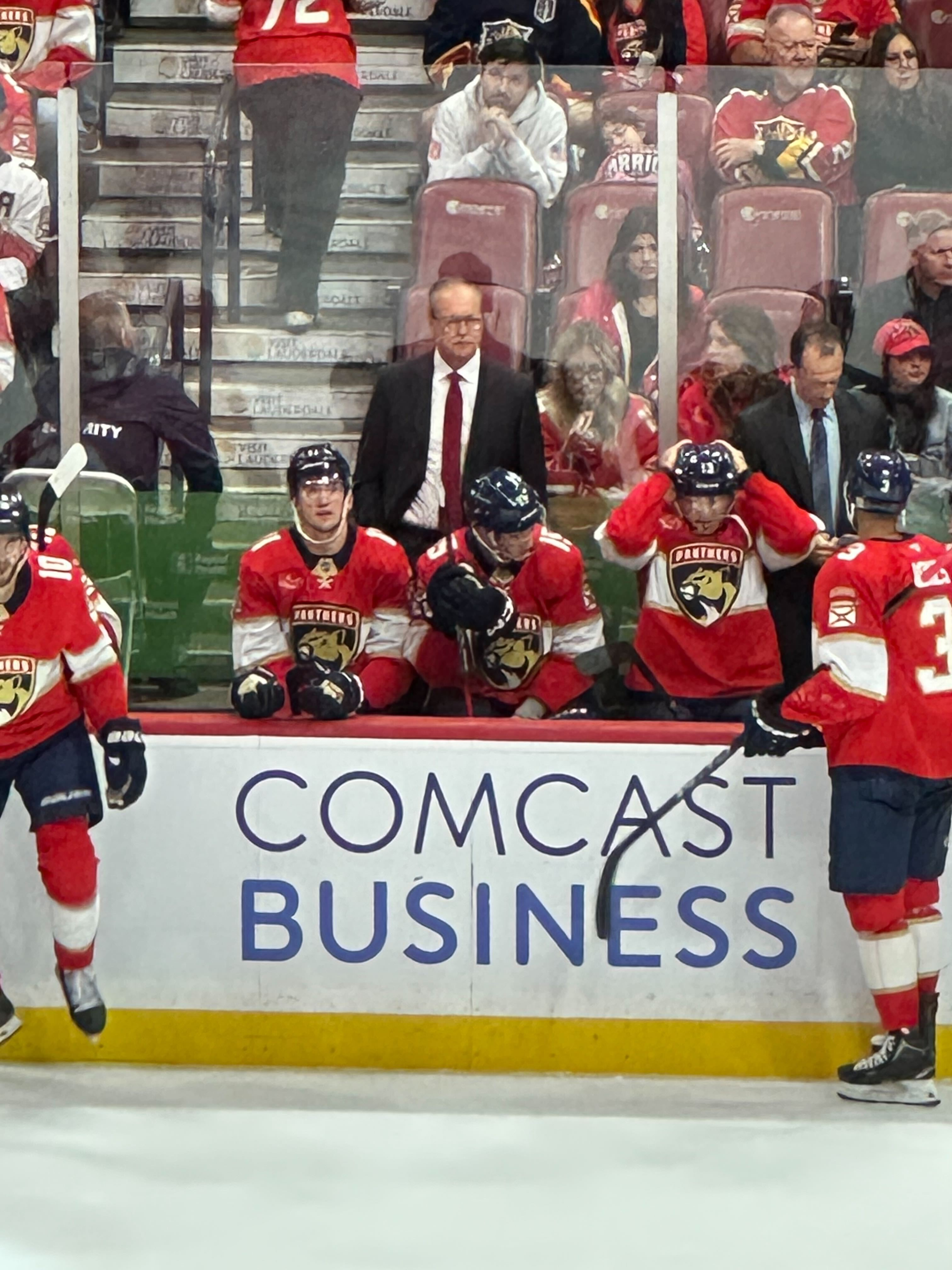
Maurice coaching the Florida Panthers during a game against the Vancouver Canucks in November 2025

On June 22, 2022, Maurice was named head coach of the Florida Panthers, replacing interim head coach Andrew Brunette. In his first season, the Panthers finished with a 42–32–8 record in the regular season, qualifying for the 2023 playoffs as the second wild card and eighth seed in the Eastern Conference. On May 24, 2023, Maurice and the Panthers advanced to the 2023 Stanley Cup Final after sweeping the Carolina Hurricanes in four games in the conference finals. The Panthers ultimately lost in the Cup Final to the Vegas Golden Knights.

On December 27, 2023, Maurice became the third head coach in NHL history to coach in 1,800 regular season games. On January 24, 2024, Maurice coached his 1,813th NHL game, passing Barry Trotz for second place in most games coached list, as the Panthers won 6–2 against the Arizona Coyotes. On June 1, Maurice's Panthers defeated the New York Rangers in the conference finals and returned to the 2024 Stanley Cup Final for the second consecutive year. On June 24, he coached the Panthers to their first Stanley Cup championship after a seven-game series against the Edmonton Oilers.

The following 2024–25 season, the Panthers finished with a 47–31–4 record, placing third in the Atlantic Division. During the season, on October 22, 2024, the Panthers signed Maurice to a multi-year contract extension. Entering the playoffs as the fifth seed in the Eastern Conference, they defeated the Tampa Bay Lightning in five games in the first round, overcame the Toronto Maple Leafs in seven games in the second round, and defeated the Carolina Hurricanes in five games in the conference finals. In the 2025 Stanley Cup Final, Florida faced a rematch against the Edmonton Oilers. On June 17, 2025, the Panthers clinched their second consecutive Stanley Cup title, defeating the Oilers 5–1 in game six.

On March 24, 2026, Maurice became the second head coach in NHL history to coach 2,000 games, while Florida won 5–4 in a shootout against the Seattle Kraken.

=== International coaching ===
Maurice served as an assistant coach under head coach Ralph Krueger for Team Europe in the 2016 World Cup of Hockey.

== Head coaching record ==
=== NHL ===
Team	Year	Regular season							Playoffs			
Team	Year	G	W	L	T	OTL	Pts	Finish	W	L	Win%	Result
HFD	1995–96	70	29	33	8	—	66	5th in Northeast	—	—	—	Missed playoffs
HFD	1996–97	82	32	39	11	—	75	5th in Northeast	—	—	—	Missed playoffs
CAR	1997–98	82	33	41	8	—	74	6th in Northeast	—	—	—	Missed playoffs
CAR	1998–99	82	34	30	18	—	86	1st in Southeast	2	4	.333	Lost in conference quarterfinals (BOS)
CAR	1999–2000	82	37	35	10	0	84	3rd in Southeast	—	—	—	Missed playoffs
CAR	2000–01	82	38	32	9	3	88	2nd in Southeast	2	4	.333	Lost in conference quarterfinals (NJD)
CAR	2001–02	82	35	26	16	5	91	1st in Southeast	13	10	.565	Lost in Stanley Cup Final (DET)
CAR	2002–03	82	22	43	11	6	61	5th in Southeast	—	—	—	Missed playoffs
CAR	2003–04	30	8	12	8	2	(26)	(fired)	—	—	—	—
TOR	2006–07	82	40	31	—	11	91	3rd in Northeast	—	—	—	Missed playoffs
TOR	2007–08	82	36	35	—	11	83	5th in Northeast	—	—	—	Missed playoffs
CAR	2008–09	57	33	19	—	5	71	2nd in Southeast	8	10	.444	Lost in conference finals (PIT)
CAR	2009–10	82	35	37	—	10	80	3rd in Southeast	—	—	—	Missed playoffs
CAR	2010–11	82	40	31	—	11	91	3rd in Southeast	—	—	—	Missed playoffs
CAR	2011–12	25	8	13	—	4	(20)	(fired)	—	—	—	—
WPG	2013–14	35	18	12	—	5	41	7th in Central	—	—	—	Missed playoffs
WPG	2014–15	82	43	26	—	13	99	5th in Central	0	4	.000	Lost in first round (ANA)
WPG	2015–16	82	35	39	—	8	78	7th in Central	—	—	—	Missed playoffs
WPG	2016–17	82	40	35	—	7	87	5th in Central	—	—	—	Missed playoffs
WPG	2017–18	82	52	20	—	10	114	2nd in Central	9	8	.529	Lost in conference finals (VGK)
WPG	2018–19	82	47	30	—	5	99	2nd in Central	2	4	.333	Lost in first round (STL)
WPG	2019–20	71	37	28	—	6	80	5th in Central	1	3	.250	Lost in qualifying round (CGY)
WPG	2020–21	56	30	23	—	3	63	3rd in North	4	4	.500	Lost in second round (MTL)
WPG	2021–22	29	13	11	—	5	(31)	(resigned)	—	—	—	—
FLA	2022–23	82	42	32	—	8	92	4th in Atlantic	13	8	.619	Lost in Stanley Cup Final (VGK)
FLA	2023–24	82	52	24	—	6	110	1st in Atlantic	16	8	.667	Won Stanley Cup (EDM)
FLA	2024–25	82	47	31	—	4	98	3rd in Atlantic	16	7	.696	Won Stanley Cup (EDM)
FLA	2025–26	82	40	38	—	4	84	7th in Atlantic	—	—	—	Missed playoffs
Total		2,012	956	805	99	152			86	74	.538	12 playoff appearances 2 Stanley Cup titles

=== Other ===
Team	Year	League	Regular season								Postseason			
Team	Year	League	G	W	L	T	OTL	Pts	Pts%	Finish	W	L	Win %	Result
Detroit Junior Red Wings	1993–94	OHL	66	42	20	4	0	88	.667	1st in Emms	11	5	.688	Lost in finals (NBC)
Detroit Junior Red Wings	1994–95	OHL	66	44	18	4	0	92	.697	1st in West	16	5	.762	Won championship (GS)
Toronto Marlies	2005–06	AHL	80	41	29	—	10	92	.575	4th in North	0	4	.000	Lost in first round (GR)
Metallurg Magnitogorsk	2012–13	KHL	52	27	13	—	12	93	.596	3rd in Kharlamov	3	4	.429	Lost in conference quarterfinals (SYU)
KHL total		KHL	52	27	13	—	12	93	.596	—	3	4	.429	1 playoff appearance
AHL total		AHL	80	41	29	—	10	92	.575	—	0	4	.000	1 playoff appearance
OHL total		OHL	132	86	38	8	—	180	.682	—	27	10	.730	2 playoff appearances

Sporting positions
Preceded by Paul Holmgren	Head coach of the Hartford Whalers; 1995–1997	Succeeded by Franchise relocated to Carolina
Preceded by Franchise relocated from Hartford; Peter Laviolette	Head coach of the Carolina Hurricanes; 1997–2003; 2008–2011	Succeeded by Peter Laviolette; Kirk Muller
Preceded by Pat Quinn	Head coach of the Toronto Maple Leafs; 2006–2008	Succeeded by Ron Wilson
Preceded by Claude Noël	Head coach of the Winnipeg Jets; 2014–2021	Succeeded by Dave Lowry (interim)
Preceded by Andrew Brunette (interim)	Head coach of the Florida Panthers; 2022–present	Incumbent
