= Rick Bowness =

Canadian ice hockey player and coach

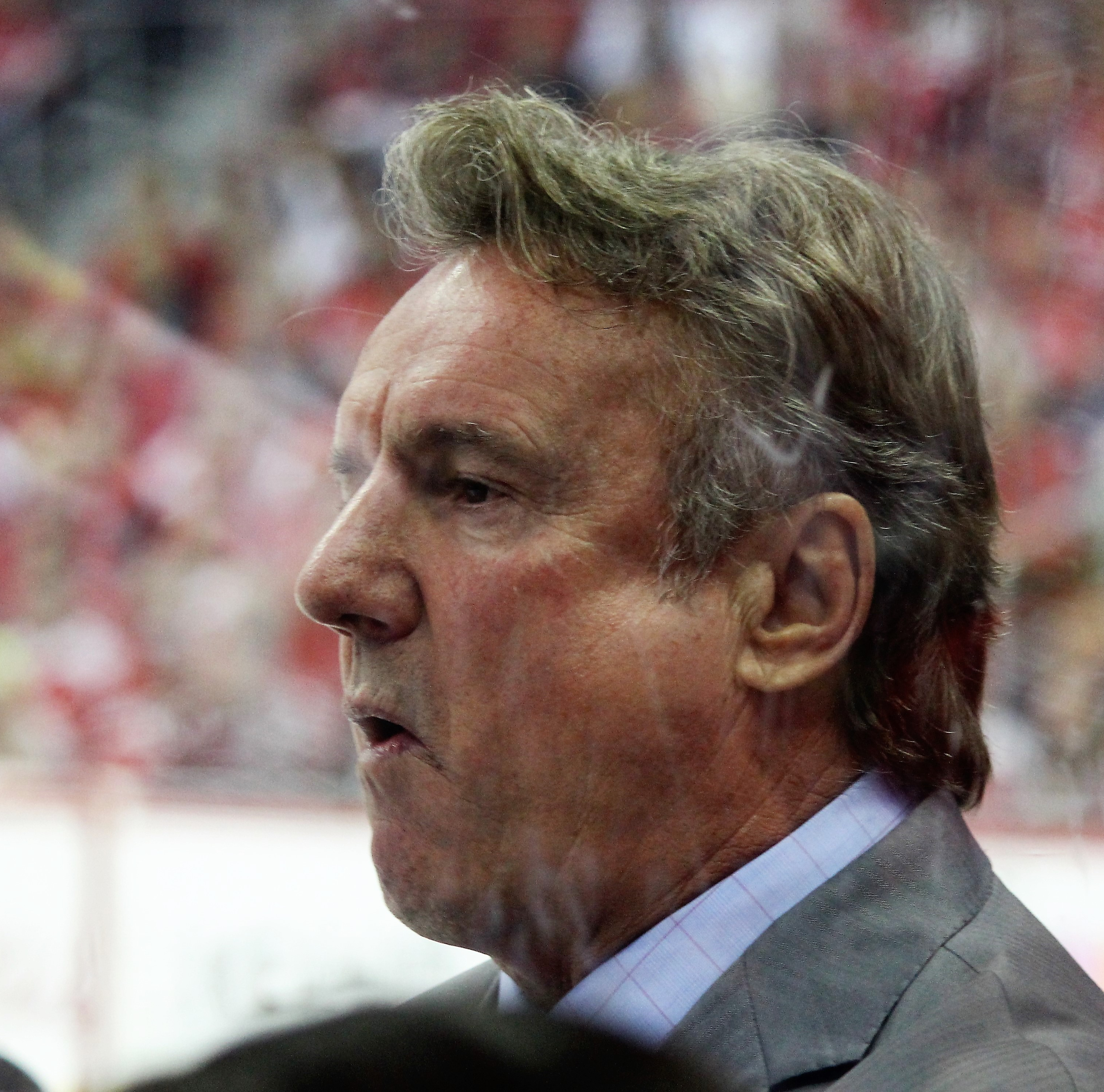
- Bowness with the Tampa Bay Lightning in 2018
- Born: January 25, 1955 (age 71) Moncton, New Brunswick, Canada
- Height: 6 ft 1 in (185 cm)
- Weight: 185 lb (84 kg; 13 st 3 lb)
- Position: Right wing
- Shot: Right
- Played for: Atlanta Flames; Detroit Red Wings; St. Louis Blues; Winnipeg Jets
- Current NHL coach: Columbus Blue Jackets
- Coached for: Winnipeg Jets (original); Boston Bruins; Ottawa Senators; New York Islanders; Phoenix Coyotes; Dallas Stars; Winnipeg Jets
- NHL draft: 26th overall, 1975; Atlanta Flames
- WHA draft: 62nd overall, 1975; Indianapolis Racers
- Playing career: 1975–1984
- Coaching career: 1982–present

Richard Gary Bowness (born January 25, 1955) is a Canadian professional ice hockey coach and former player who is the head coach for the Columbus Blue Jackets of the National Hockey League (NHL). He was selected in the second round, 26th overall, by the Atlanta Flames in the 1975 NHL amateur draft, and played in the NHL for the Flames, Detroit Red Wings, St. Louis Blues, and original Winnipeg Jets. As a coach, Bowness has also served as head coach for the original Winnipeg Jets, Boston Bruins, Ottawa Senators, New York Islanders, Phoenix Coyotes, Dallas Stars, and the current Winnipeg Jets. He likewise held the position of assistant coach roles with the original Jets, Coyotes, Vancouver Canucks, Tampa Bay Lightning, and Stars.

As of 2026, Bowness is the last active coach in the NHL who was also a head coach for an NHL team in the 1980s, and the only coach to have led both iterations of the Winnipeg Jets. His 2,726 games as an NHL head or assistant coach are the most by anyone in league history.

== Playing career ==
=== Junior hockey ===
Born in Moncton, New Brunswick, Bowness began his junior hockey career with the Quebec Remparts of Quebec Major Junior Hockey League (QMJHL) in 1972–73, where in 30 games, Bowness had two goals and nine points. In 14 playoff games with Quebec, Bowness had a goal and five points.

Bowness started the 1973–74 season with the Remparts. He appeared in 34 games, scoring 16 goals and 45 points. Midway through the season, the Remparts traded Bowness to the Montreal Bleu Blanc Rouge, with whom he finished the season, scoring nine goals and 26 points in 33 games with the club, helping them to reach the playoffs. In nine postseason games, Bowness had four goals and eight points.

In 1974–75, Bowness played the entire season with the Bleu Blanc Rouge, appearing in 71 games, scoring 24 goals and 95 points to finish fourth in team scoring. In eight playoff games, Bowness scored five goals and eight points. After the season, Bowness was drafted by the Atlanta Flames in the second round, 26th overall in 1975 NHL amateur draft, as well as in the fifth round, 62nd overall by the Indianapolis Racers of the World Hockey Association (WHA) in the 1975 WHA amateur draft.

=== Professional playing career ===
Bowness spent the majority of his first professional season in 1975–76 with the Tulsa Oilers of the Central Hockey League (CHL), where in 64 games, he earned 25 goals and 63 points, and had 160 penalty minutes. In nine playoff games, Bowness had four goals and seven points. Bowness also played two games with Nova Scotia Voyageurs of American Hockey League (AHL), recording one assist. Bowness also made his National Hockey League(NHL) debut during the 1975–76 season, going pointless in five games with the Atlanta Flames.

His 1976–77 season was split between Tulsa and the Flames, as Bowness appeared in 39 games with Tulsa, scoring 15 goals and 30 points. In eight postseason games with the Oilers, Bowness had one assist. He also played in 28 games with the Atlanta Flames, recording four assists. On August 18, 1977, the Flames traded Bowness to the Detroit Red Wings for cash considerations.

Bowness spent the entire 1977–78 NHL season in the NHL with Detroit, scoring eight goals and 19 points in 61 games, helping the team reach the playoffs. In four playoff games with Detroit, Bowness was held off the scoresheet as the Red Wings lost to the Montreal Canadiens in the quarter-finals. He was set to return to the Red Wings for the 1978–79 season, however, on October 10, 1978, Detroit traded Bowness to the St. Louis Blues for cash.

Bowness spent most of the 1978–79 season in the CHL with the Salt Lake Golden Eagles, appearing in 48 games with the team, scoring 25 goals and 53 points with Salt Lake. In ten playoff games with the Golden Eagles, Bowness had five goals and nine points. Bowness also appeared in 24 games with the St. Louis Blues, scoring a goal and four points with the club. Bowness once again spent a majority of the 1979–80 with the Golden Eagles. In 71 games with Salt Lake, Bowness had 25 goals and 71 points to finish fifth in team scoring, while accumulating a team-high 135 penalty minutes. In 13 playoff games with Salt Lake, Bowness had five goals and 14 points. He also played in 10 games with the Blues, scoring a goal and three points. On June 13, 1980, the Blues traded Bowness to the Winnipeg Jets for Craig Norwich.

Bowness played in 45 games with the Winnipeg Jets in the 1980–81, scoring eight goals and 25 points, however, the Jets failed to make the playoffs. Bowness also returned to the Tulsa Oilers of the CHL for 35 games, scoring 12 goals and 32 points. He spent the entire 1981–82 regular season playing with Tulsa, finishing second on the team in scoring with 34 goals and 87 points in 79 games. In three playoff games with the Oilers, Bowness had two assists. Bowness also appeared in a playoff game with the Jets and was held off the scoresheet.

In the 1982–83 season, Bowness was a player-coach with the Sherbrooke Jets of the American Hockey League (AHL). In 65 games, Bowness had 17 goals and 48 points with Sherbrooke. Bowness wrapped up his playing career in the 1983–84 season with Sherbrooke, playing in 21 games, scoring nine goals and 20 points. He retired after the season to become an assistant coach with the Winnipeg Jets.

== Coaching career ==
=== Winnipeg Jets (original franchise) ===
Bowness became the first head coach of the Winnipeg Jets' new AHL affiliate, the Sherbrooke Jets, in the 1982–83 AHL season, as a player-coach with the club. Sherbrooke had a tough season, finishing in last place in the North Division with a 22–54–4 record, earning 48 points. He stepped down as player-coach before the 1983–84, as he played one last season before retiring in the summer of 1984.

Bowness became an assistant coach of the Winnipeg Jets under head coach Barry Long in the 1984–85 season. Winnipeg had a successful season, going 43–27–10, earning 96 points, finishing second in the Smythe Division. In the playoffs, the Jets defeated the Calgary Flames before losing to the Edmonton Oilers in the Smythe Division final.

Bowness remained on the Jets coaching staff in the 1985–86 season, however, the club changed head coaches during the season, as Barry Long was replaced with John Ferguson late in the season. The Jets struggled to a 26–47–7 record, earning 59 points, but still good for third in the Smythe Division. In the season opener against the Calgary Flames, Bowness was once fined $500 and suspended for three games after punching Calgary forward Tim Hunter in the head during a brawl. Brian Hayward and Hunter had been involved in a scuffle which escalated to a full brawl after Hunter continued to attack Hayward. In the playoffs, the Jets were swept by the Flames in the first round.

In 1986–87, Winnipeg hired a new head coach, Dan Maloney, and retained Bowness as an assistant. The Jets rebounded from their poor season, going 40–32–8, earning 88 points, to finish in third place in the Smythe Division. In the playoffs, Winnipeg defeated the Flames in the opening round, however, they were swept by the Oilers in the Smythe Division final. After the season, Bowness became the first head coach of the Moncton Hawks for the 1987–88 season. Bowness led the expansion team to a 27–43–8–2 record, earning 64 points and a sixth-place finish in the North Division, failing to qualify for the playoffs.

He began the 1988–89 season with Moncton, leading the club to a 28–20–5 record in 53 games. Bowness was then promoted to the NHL, as the Winnipeg Jets fired Dan Maloney, and named Bowness as head coach.

Bowness coached his first NHL game on February 9, 1989, as the Jets lost to the New York Rangers 4–3 at Madison Square Garden. After a 0–3–1 start, Bowness earned his first NHL victory on February 17, 1989, defeating the New Jersey Devils 3–2 in overtime at the Winnipeg Arena. Bowness led the team to an 8–17–3 record to finish the 1988–89 season, as the Jets missed the playoffs. After the season, the Jets hired Bob Murdoch as their new head coach, and Bowness left the organization.

=== Boston Bruins organization ===
Bowness became the head coach of the Boston Bruins' AHL affiliate, the Maine Mariners, for the 1989–90 AHL season. In his first season with Maine, Bowness led the club to a 31–38–11 record, earning 73 points and a fifth-place finish as the club failed to qualify for the playoffs. He returned to the Mariners for a second season in 1990–91, as the Mariners improved to a 34–34–12 record, getting 80 points, however, Maine finished in fifth place yet again. Mariners lost the first-round series of the playoffs to the Fredericton Canadiens.

Bowness returned to the NHL to become the head coach of the Bruins for the 1991–92 season. He coached his first game as a Bruin on October 3, 1991, defeating the New York Rangers 5–3 at the Boston Garden. Overall, the Bruins finished the season with a 36–32–12 record, earning 84 points and second place in the Adams Division. Bowness coached his first playoff game on April 19, 1992, losing 3–2 to the Buffalo Sabres. The Bruins eventually won the series in seven games, followed by a four-game sweep over the Montreal Canadiens to reach the Wales Conference finals. It was the Bruins' first four-game playoff sweep over the Canadiens. Boston was then swept by the Pittsburgh Penguins, who went on to win the Stanley Cup.

After just one season with the Bruins, Bowness was not brought back, as Boston replaced him with Brian Sutter. Bowness then took a job with the expansion Ottawa Senators, becoming that franchise's first head coach.

=== Ottawa Senators ===
Bowness became the first head coach of the expansion Ottawa Senators when he was hired in 1992. On October 8, 1992, the Senators won the franchise's first game, over the eventual Stanley Cup champion Montreal Canadiens 5–3 at the Ottawa Civic Centre. With a lineup perilously thin on talent, wins for Bowness and the Senators were few and far between, and Ottawa finished with a league-worst 10–70–4 record, earning 24 points and a tie for last place in the overall NHL standings with the San Jose Sharks.

Bowness returned to the Senators for the 1993–94 season. Though Ottawa boasted a somewhat stronger lineup and improved its season total by 13 points, the team nonetheless finished in last place in the NHL with 37 points.

Under Bowness' leadership, the Senators continued to go through some growing pains but also steadily improved. In the team's lockout-shortened third season, Ottawa finished with a 9–34–5 record in the shortened 48-game schedule, finishing in last place in the league for the third straight season.

Bowness began a fourth season with the Senators in 1995–96. After a promising start which saw Ottawa record a 6–5–0 record after 11 games, the club fell into an eight-game losing streak and fell to 6–13–0, and Bowness was relieved of his duties. He was replaced by Dave Allison, who ultimately won only two of 27 games and was fired mere weeks later.

=== New York Islanders ===
Bowness joined the New York Islanders as an associate coach for the 1996–97 under head coach Mike Milbury. After the Islanders got off to a rough 13–23–9 start, Milbury resigned and Bowness became the new head coach of the Islanders. On January 22, 1997, Bowness coached his first game with New York, leading the team to a huge 8–1 victory over the Edmonton Oilers. The Islanders went 16–18–3 under Bowness; however, they failed to reach the playoffs. Bowness returned as the Islanders' head coach for the 1997–98 season; however, the club struggled to a 22–32–9 record, and he was fired, as Mike Milbury replaced him behind the bench.

=== Phoenix Coyotes ===
Bowness joined the Phoenix Coyotes (the former Winnipeg Jets) coaching staff as an assistant under Bobby Francis for the 1999–2000 season. The Coyotes had a strong season, going 39–31–8–4, earning 90 points and third place in the Pacific Division, sixth in the Western Conference. In the playoffs, the Coyotes lost in five games to the Colorado Avalanche in the first round. Despite finishing with a 35–27–17–3 record, earning 90 points, the Coyotes failed to reach the playoffs in the 2000–01, as Phoenix finished in ninth place in the Western Conference.

The Coyotes rebounded in the 2001–02, going 40–27–9–6 to earn 95 points and finish in sixth place in the Western Conference and reach the postseason. In the playoffs, the Coyotes lost in five games to the San Jose Sharks in the first round. After the season, the Coyotes' head coach Francis won the Jack Adams Award for Coach of the Year.

Phoenix struggled in the 2002–03 season, going 31–35–11–5, earning 78 points and 11th place in the Western Conference, well out of a playoff position. The club had another tough season in 2003–04, as the Coyotes had a 20–24–15–3 before the team fired Francis and named Bowness as interim head coach. Under Bowness, Phoenix continued to struggle, as they went 2–12–3–3, and finished well out of the postseason once again.

With the 2004–05 NHL lockout cancelling the season, Bowness returned to the club in 2005–06 as an assistant under new head coach Wayne Gretzky. The Coyotes missed the playoffs once again with a 38–39–5 record, earning 81 points. After the season, Bowness left the club.

=== Vancouver Canucks ===
Bowness joined the Vancouver Canucks as an assistant coach under Alain Vigneault for the 2006–07 season. In his first season with Vancouver, the team won the Northwest Division with a 49–26–7 record, earning 105 points and third in the Western Conference. In the 2007 playoffs, the Canucks defeated the sixth-seeded Dallas Stars in seven games in the first round, however, Vancouver lost in five games to the second-seeded and eventual Stanley Cup champion Anaheim Ducks in the second round.

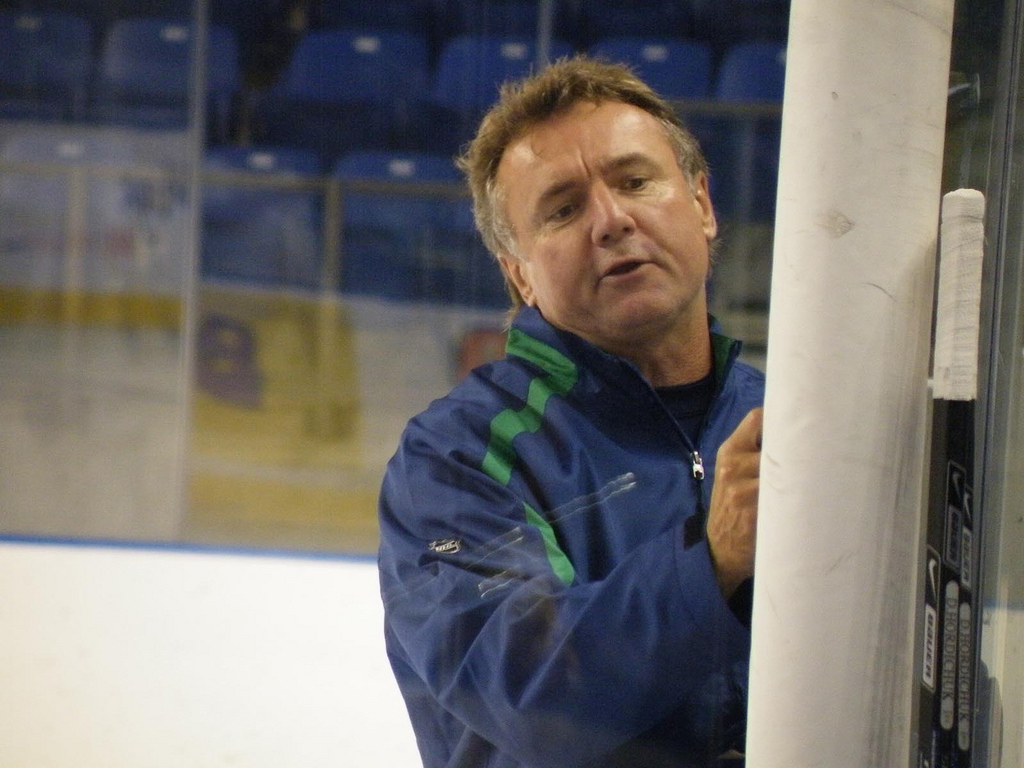
Bowness with the Vancouver Canucks in April 2009

The Canucks struggled to a 39–33–10 record in 2007–08, earning 88 points, and an 11th-place finish in the Western Conference and out of the playoffs by three points.

Vancouver rebounded in 2008–09, winning the Northwest Division for the second time in three seasons, going 45–27–10, recording 100 points and third place in the Western Conference. In the playoffs, the Canucks swept the sixth-seeded St. Louis Blues in four games, but they lost to the fourth-seeded Chicago Blackhawks in six games in the second round.

The 2009–10 was another very successful season for the Canucks, as the club once again won the Northwest Division with a 49–28–5 record, good for 103 points and third in the Western Conference. Vancouver defeated the sixth-seeded Los Angeles Kings in six games, but they lost to the second-seeded and eventual Stanley Cup champion Chicago Blackhawks in six games in the second round for the second consecutive season.

The club had a record-breaking 2010–11 campaign, as the Canucks won the Presidents' Trophy with a 54–19–9 record, earning a club record 117 points. In the postseason, Vancouver defeated their rivals, the defending Stanley Cup champion and eighth-seeded Chicago Blackhawks in seven games, followed by winning a six-game series against the fifth-seeded Nashville Predators to make the Western Conference final for the first time since 1994. The Canucks easily defeated the second seeded San Jose Sharks in five games to clinch a berth in the 2011 Stanley Cup Final against the third-seeded Boston Bruins. In the finals for the first time since 1994, the Canucks built a 3–2 series lead but lost their last two games to lose the Stanley Cup in seven games, one win short from winning the Stanley Cup.

In the 2011–12 season, the Canucks would win their second consecutive Presidents’ Trophy. Despite this, the Canucks would get defeated in five games in the first round of the 2012 playoffs by the eighth-seeded and eventual Stanley Cup champion Los Angeles Kings.

On May 22, 2013, shortly after being swept in the first round of the playoffs by the sixth-seeded San Jose Sharks after finishing the lockout-shortened 2012–13 season as the third seed in the Western Conference, Bowness, head coach Vigneault, and assistant coach Newell Brown were all fired from their positions.

=== Tampa Bay Lightning ===
Bowness joined the Tampa Bay Lightning as an associate coach on June 3, 2013, joining first-year head coach Jon Cooper. His responsibilities included the team's defense and penalty-killing, the same responsibilities he had the previous seven years in Vancouver.

On February 7, 2015, Bowness coached in his 2000th game in the NHL. The Lightning went all the way to the 2015 Stanley Cup Final but would fall to the Chicago Blackhawks in a close six game series.

The Lightning would go on another lengthy playoff run as they would lose in the Eastern Conference Finals in the 2016 playoffs in seven games to the Pittsburgh Penguins, one win short from back-to-back appearances in the Stanley Cup Final.

On June 14, 2016, Bowness signed a multi-year extension with the Lightning. On February 10, 2017, Bowness coached his 2,165th NHL game in a 2–1 shootout loss to the Minnesota Wild, passing Scotty Bowman for the most games coached as a head and assistant combined. Due to injuries with certain players throughout the 2016–17 season, the Lightning would miss the 2017 playoffs by one point.

He was dismissed on May 31, 2018, after general manager Steve Yzerman called the defense "not quite good enough" during the 2017–18 regular season where the Lightning finished as the top seed in the Eastern Conference and the 2018 playoffs which saw the Lightning reach the Eastern Conference Finals and losing in seven games to the second-seeded and eventual Stanley Cup champion Washington Capitals, one win short from the Stanley Cup Final once more.

=== Dallas Stars ===
Bowness was hired by the Dallas Stars as an assistant coach on June 22, 2018.

On December 10, 2019, he was named interim head coach of the Stars after Jim Montgomery was fired due to unprofessional conduct. At the time of his promotion, Bowness had a career record of 123–289–51 as a head coach. He led the Stars to the Stanley Cup Final where they lost to his former team, the Tampa Bay Lightning, in six games.

On October 29, 2020, he was named the Stars' 24th head coach in the franchise history. After a disappointing COVID-19-shortened 2020–21 campaign, Bowness guided the Stars back to the postseason in 2022 where they lost a close seven-game series to the Calgary Flames.

Shortly after Dallas' elimination from the 2022, and with his contract set to expire, Bowness stepped away from his position on May 20, 2022.

=== Winnipeg Jets and first retirement ===
On July 3, 2022, the modern Winnipeg Jets franchise named Bowness head coach, replacing Dave Lowry.

During the 2023–24 season, he spent time away from the team twice, first because of a seizure his wife experienced in October 2023, and then for a minor medical procedure of his own in March 2024. Associate coach Scott Arniel filled in for him on the bench. He was a finalist for the season's Jack Adams Award for "the NHL coach adjudged to have contributed the most to his team's success."

Bowness announced his retirement on May 6, 2024, after the Jets were eliminated in the first round of the 2024 playoffs. At the time, his 2,726 games coached marked the most in NHL history, and he also stood as one of three head coaches (along with Scotty Bowman and Pat Quinn) to work in the NHL in five different decades.

=== Columbus Blue Jackets ===
On January 12, 2026, Bowness came out of retirement to replace Dean Evason as head coach of the Columbus Blue Jackets. After a 21–11–5 conclusion to the regular season, Bowness signed a one-year extension with Columbus on April 16.

== Personal life ==
Bowness' daughter, Kristen, is the youth program director of the Utah Mammoth. Bowness' youngest son, Ryan, is the assistant general manager and director of player personnel for the New York Islanders. Previously, Ryan was the associate general manager of the Ottawa Senators, director of professional scouting for the Pittsburgh Penguins, and was a scout for the Penguins when he won the Stanley Cup in 2017. Bowness' daughter-in-law, Jodee, is vice president of ticket sales and service for the Colorado Avalanche. Bowness' eldest son, Rick Jr., formerly worked for the Denver Pioneers men's ice hockey program and was a staff member at DU when they won the 2017 NCAA Division I men's ice hockey tournament in Chicago. Rick, Jr. also plays Bass guitar in award-winning Denver rock band The Lollygags.

== Career statistics ==
=== Regular season and playoffs ===
			Regular season					Playoffs
Season	Team	League	GP	G	A	Pts	PIM	GP	G	A	Pts	PIM
1972–73	Quebec Remparts	QMJHL	30	2	7	9	2	14	1	4	5	6
1973–74	Saint Mary's Huskies	CIAU	1	0	0	0	0	—	—	—	—	—
1973–74	Quebec Remparts	QMJHL	34	16	29	45	64	—	—	—	—	—
1973–74	Montreal Bleu Blanc Rouge	QMJHL	33	9	17	26	31	9	4	4	8	4
1974–75	Montreal Blue Blanc Rouge	QMJHL	71	24	71	95	132	8	5	3	8	29
1975–76	Atlanta Flames	NHL	5	0	0	0	0	—	—	—	—	—
1975–76	Nova Scotia Voyageurs	AHL	2	0	1	1	0	—	—	—	—	—
1975–76	Tulsa Oilers	CHL	64	25	38	63	160	9	4	3	7	12
1976–77	Atlanta Flames	NHL	28	0	4	4	29	—	—	—	—	—
1976–77	Tulsa Oilers	CHL	39	15	15	30	72	8	0	1	1	20
1977–78	Detroit Red Wings	NHL	61	8	11	19	76	4	0	0	0	2
1978–79	St. Louis Blues	NHL	24	1	3	4	30	—	—	—	—	—
1978–79	Salt Lake Golden Eagles	CHL	48	25	28	53	92	10	5	4	9	27
1979–80	St. Louis Blues	NHL	10	1	2	3	11	—	—	—	—	—
1979–80	Salt Lake Golden Eagles	CHL	71	25	46	71	135	13	5	9	14	39
1980–81	Winnipeg Jets	NHL	45	8	17	25	45	—	—	—	—	—
1980–81	Tulsa Oilers	CHL	35	12	20	32	82	—	—	—	—	—
1981–82	Winnipeg Jets	NHL	—	—	—	—	—	1	0	0	0	0
1981–82	Tulsa Oilers	CHL	79	34	53	87	201	3	0	2	2	2
1982–83	Sherbrooke Jets	AHL	65	17	31	48	117	—	—	—	—	—
1983–84	Sherbrooke Jets	AHL	21	9	11	20	44	—	—	—	—	—
NHL totals			173	18	37	55	191	5	0	0	0	2

== Head coaching record ==
Team	Year	Regular season							Postseason		
Team	Year	G	W	L	T	OTL	Pts	Finish	W	L	Result
WIN	1988–89	28	8	17	3	—	(64)	5th in Smythe	—	—	Missed playoffs
WIN total		28	8	17	3	—			—	—	
BOS	1991–92	80	36	32	12	—	84	2nd in Adams	8	7	Lost in conference finals (PIT)
BOS total		80	36	32	12	—			8	7	1 playoff appearance
OTT	1992–93	84	10	70	4	—	24	6th in Adams	—	—	Missed playoffs
OTT	1993–94	84	14	61	9	—	37	7th in Northeast	—	—	Missed playoffs
OTT	1994–95	48	9	34	5	—	23	7th in Northeast	—	—	Missed playoffs
OTT	1995–96	19	6	13	0	—	(41)	(fired)	—	—	—
OTT total		235	39	178	18	—			—	—	
NYI	1996–97	37	16	18	3	—	(70)	7th in Atlantic	—	—	Missed playoffs
NYI	1997–98	63	22	32	9	—	(71)	(fired)	—	—	—
NYI total		100	38	50	12	—			—	—	
PHX	2003–04	20	2	12	3	3	(68)	5th in Pacific	—	—	Missed playoffs
PHX total		20	2	12	3	3			—	—	
DAL	2019–20	38	20	13	—	5	(45)	3rd in Central	15	12	Lost in Stanley Cup Final (TBL)
DAL	2020–21	56	23	19	—	14	60	5th in Central	—	—	Missed playoffs
DAL	2021–22	82	46	30	—	6	98	4th in Central	3	4	Lost in first round (CGY)
DAL total		176	89	62	—	25			18	16	2 playoff appearances
WPG	2022–23	82	46	33	—	3	95	4th in Central	1	4	Lost in first round (VGK)
WPG	2023–24	82	52	24	—	6	110	2nd in Central	1	4	Lost in first round (COL)
WPG total		164	98	57	—	9			2	8	2 playoff appearances
CBJ	2025–26	37	21	11	—	5	(47)	5th in Metropolitan	—	—	Missed playoffs
CBJ total		37	21	11	—	5			—	—	
Total		840	331	419	48	42			28	31	5 playoff appearances

== Awards and honours ==
Award	Year	Ref
NHL
NHL All-Star Game	2024	

Sporting positions
Preceded by Dan Maloney	Head coach of the original Winnipeg Jets; 1989	Succeeded by Bob Murdoch
Preceded by Mike Milbury	Head coach of the Boston Bruins; 1991–1992	Succeeded by Brian Sutter
Preceded by Position created	Head coach of the Ottawa Senators; 1992–1995	Succeeded by Dave Allison
Preceded by Mike Milbury	Head coach of the New York Islanders; 1997–1998	Succeeded by Mike Milbury
Preceded by Bobby Francis	Head coach of the Phoenix Coyotes; 2004	Succeeded by Wayne Gretzky
Preceded by Jim Montgomery	Head coach of the Dallas Stars; 2019–2022	Succeeded by Peter DeBoer
Preceded by Dave Lowry	Head coach of the Winnipeg Jets; 2022–2024	Succeeded by Scott Arniel
Preceded by Dean Evason	Head coach of the Columbus Blue Jackets; 2026–present	Incumbent
