= Pascal Vincent =

Canadian ice hockey coach and player

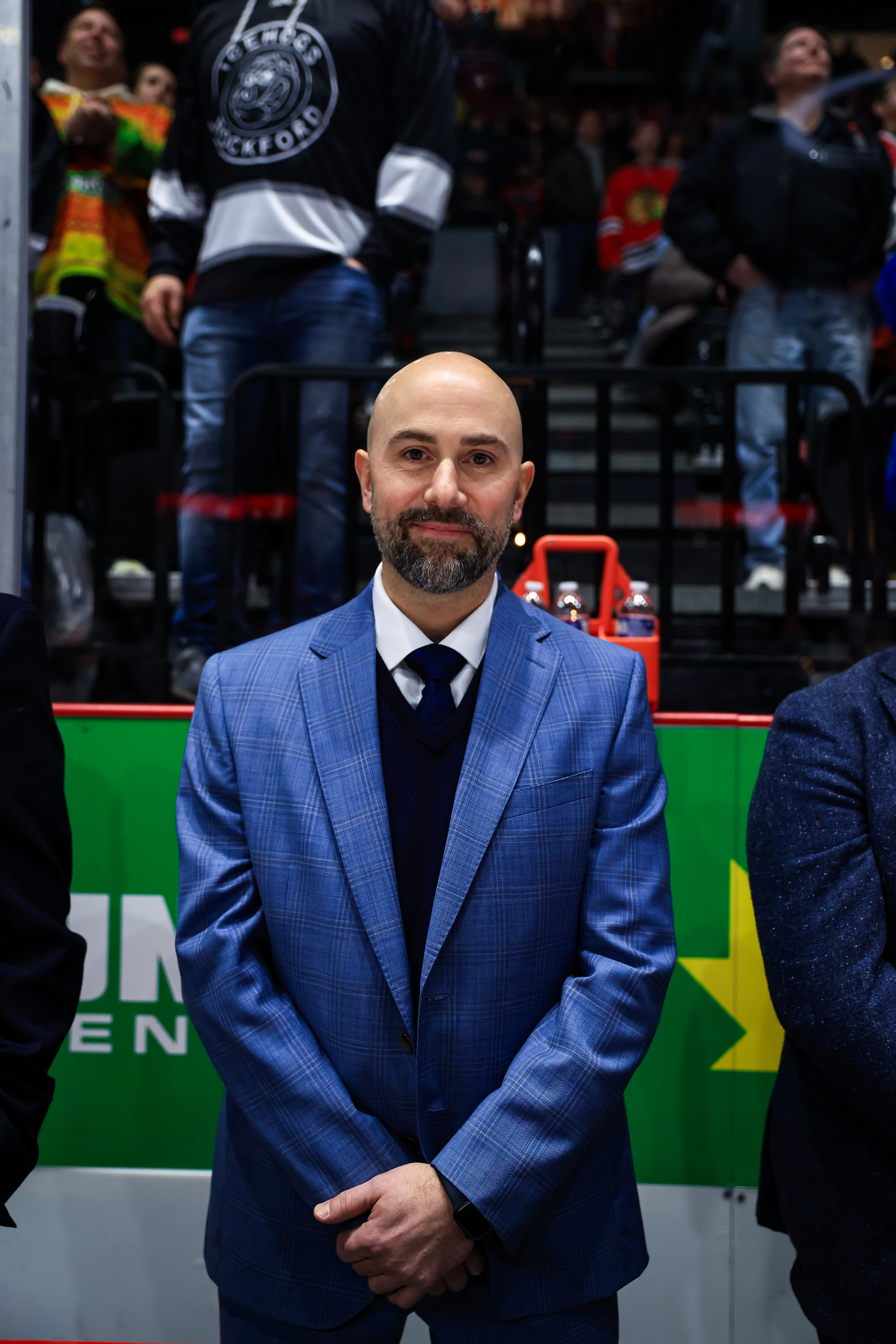
- Vincent at the 2026 AHL All-Star Skills Competition
- Born: September 22, 1971 (age 54) Laval, Quebec, Canada
- Height: 5 ft 11 in (180 cm)
- Weight: 185 lb (84 kg; 13 st 3 lb)
- Position: Centre
- Shot: Right
- Played for: Knoxville Cherokees
- Coached for: Columbus Blue Jackets
- NHL draft: Undrafted
- Playing career: 1988–1993
- Coaching career: 1994–present

Pascal Vincent (born September 22, 1971) is a Canadian professional ice hockey coach and former player who is currently an assistant coach for the Seattle Kraken of the National Hockey League (NHL).

After success in the Quebec Major Junior Hockey League (QMJHL), where he was named both general manager of the year and coach of the year while overseeing the Cape Breton Screaming Eagles, Vincent joined the NHL's Winnipeg Jets organization as an assistant coach in 2011, before taking over their American Hockey League (AHL) affiliate Manitoba Moose from 2016 to 2021. After two years as an assistant coach with the Columbus Blue Jackets, he was named their head coach prior to the start of the 2023–24 season when coach Mike Babcock resigned, but was subsequently fired at season's end, having finished last in the Metropolitan Division. He is a two-time recipient of the Louis A. R. Pieri Memorial Award as outstanding AHL coach, having won the award for the 2017–18 and 2024–25 seasons.

== Playing career ==
Vincent made his Quebec Major Junior Hockey League (QMJHL) debut as a centre in the 1988–89 season with the St. Jean Castors. He played three additional seasons in the QMJHL between St. Jean, the Laval Titan, Verdun Collège Français, and the Granby Bisons before completing his junior career in 1992. Vincent then played a single season in the ECHL with the Knoxville Cherokees before retiring from active play following the 1992–93 ECHL season.

== Coaching and executive career ==
Vincent began his coaching career as an assistant coach of the Saint-Jean Lynx of the Quebec Major Junior Hockey League (QMJHL) before becoming head coach for the Laval-Laurentides-Lanaudiere (LLL) Regents of the Quebec AAA Midget Hockey League (QMAAA). He then joined the Cape Breton Screaming Eagles as an assistant coach for the 1999–2000 QMJHL season before assuming the role as head coach shortly thereafter. He likewise became the team's general manager in 2001.

Vincent was the recipient of the 2007 Maurice Filion Trophy as the QMJHL's top general manager, and the 2008 Ron Lapointe Trophy as the league's top coach. Following the 2007–08 QMJHL season, he joined the recently relocated Montreal Junior Hockey Club as head coach and general manager.

On July 22, 2011, Vincent was named an assistant coach of the Winnipeg Jets of the National Hockey League (NHL). After five years in that role, the Jets promoted him to head coach of their American Hockey League (AHL) affiliate, the Manitoba Moose in 2016. At the conclusion of the 2017–18 AHL season, he won the Louis A. R. Pieri Memorial Award as Most Outstanding Coach. Vincent stepped down from his position with the Moose to join the coaching staff of the Columbus Blue Jackets on June 24, 2021.

On September 17, 2023, Vincent was named head coach of the Blue Jackets, following the preseason resignation of Mike Babcock. After only one season as head coach, he was fired on June 17, 2024.

On July 16, 2024, Vincent was named head coach of his hometown Laval Rocket, the AHL affiliate of the Montreal Canadiens. His impact on the team was instantaneous, with the Rocket posting a franchise record seven consecutive wins to begin the 2024–25 season. He was inducted into the Laval Hockey Hall of Fame in November 2024. The Rocket would have the best season in franchise history to date, winning the Macgregor Kilpatrick Trophy as AHL regular season champions for the first time. In recognition of his work, Vincent received his second Pieri Award as AHL coach of the year. Following his second season with the Rocket in 2025–26, Vincent's tenure with the organization ended when it was announced that he had joined the Seattle Kraken as an assistant coach on June 11, 2026.

== Career statistics ==
			Regular season					Playoffs
Season	Team	League	GP	G	A	Pts	PIM	GP	G	A	Pts	PIM
1988–89	St. Jean Castors	QMJHL	48	0	0	0	0	—	—	—	—	—
1989–90	St. Jean Lynx	QMJHL	70	4	7	11	45	—	—	—	—	—
1990–91	Laval Titan	QMJHL	64	4	8	12	12	13	1	0	1	8
1991–92	Laval Titan	QMJHL	53	3	20	23	36	—	—	—	—	—
1991–92	Verdun College-Francais	QMJHL	17	5	7	12	12	19	1	6	7	14
1992–93	Granby Bisons	QMJHL	2	0	0	0	0	—	—	—	—	—
1992–93	Knoxville Cherokees	ECHL	57	4	7	11	33	—	—	—	—	—
QMJHL totals			254	16	42	58	105	32	2	6	8	22
ECHL totals			57	4	7	11	33	—	—	—	—	—

== Head coaching record ==
Team	Year	Regular season						Postseason			
Team	Year	G	W	L	OTL	Pts	Finish	W	L	Win %	Result
CBJ	2023–24	82	27	43	12	66	8th in Metropolitan	—	—	—	Missed playoffs
Total		82	27	43	12			—	—	—	

Awards and achievements
Preceded by Ted Nolan	Maurice Filion Trophy; 2006–07	Succeeded by Jacques Beaulieu
Preceded by Clément Jodoin	Ron Lapointe Trophy; 2007–08	Succeeded by Danny Flynn
Preceded by Roy Sommer; Todd Nelson	Louis A. R. Pieri Memorial Award; 2017–18; 2024–25	Succeeded by Mike Vellucci; Most recent
Sporting positions
Preceded by Keith McCambridge	Head coach of the Manitoba Moose; 2016–2021	Succeeded by Mark Morrison
Preceded by Mike Babcock	Head coach of the Columbus Blue Jackets; 2023–2024	Succeeded by Dean Evason
Preceded by Jean-François Houle	Head coach of the Laval Rocket; 2024–present	Succeeded by Incumbent
