= Dave Lowry =

Canadian ice hockey coach and player

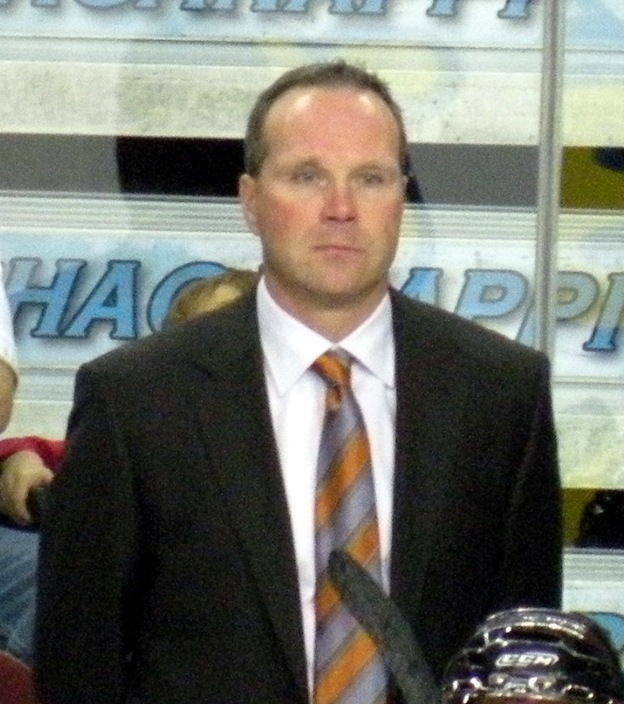
- Lowry with the Calgary Hitmen in 2009
- Born: February 14, 1965 (age 61) Sudbury, Ontario, Canada
- Height: 6 ft 1 in (185 cm)
- Weight: 200 lb (91 kg; 14 st 4 lb)
- Position: Left wing
- Shot: Left
- Played for: Vancouver Canucks; St. Louis Blues; Florida Panthers; San Jose Sharks; Calgary Flames
- Coached for: Winnipeg Jets; Seattle Kraken; Calgary Flames
- NHL draft: 110th overall, 1983; Vancouver Canucks
- Playing career: 1985–2004
- Coaching career: 2005–present

David John Lowry (born February 14, 1965) is a Canadian ice hockey coach and former professional player. As of 2026 he is an assistant coach with the Calgary Flames of the National Hockey League (NHL). He played in the NHL from 1985 to 2004. Lowry's sons, Adam and Joel, were drafted by the Winnipeg Jets and the Los Angeles Kings, respectively.

== Playing career ==
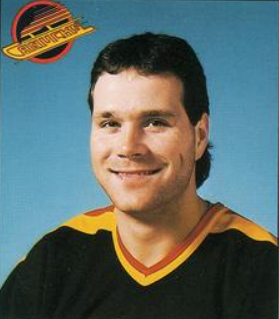
1987 card of Lowry for Vancouver Canucks

Born in Sudbury, Ontario and raised in Ottawa, Lowry was drafted by the Vancouver Canucks in the 6th round, 110th overall, in the 1983 NHL entry draft. He played three seasons with the London Knights of the Ontario Hockey League (OHL) before joining the Canucks for the start of the 1985–86 NHL season. In Vancouver, he played for three seasons, spending part of the 1987–88 season in the minors for the Fredericton Express of the American Hockey League (AHL). On September 29, 1988, prior to the start of the 1988–89 NHL season, Lowry was traded to the St. Louis Blues for Ernie Vargas.

After spending most of the 1988–89 season with the Peoria Rivermen of the International Hockey League (IHL), Lowry joined the Blues for the last 21 games of the season, including ten more games in the playoffs. Lowry stayed with St. Louis until the end of the 1992–93 NHL season. His highest goal total was 19, which he did twice, both times with the Blues, and his highest point total was 40, which was also with the Blues. Before he retired, he played over 1000 NHL games.

Lowry was drafted in the expansion draft by the Florida Panthers before the 1993–94 NHL season. Lowry was on the Panthers' Stanley Cup finalist team in 1995–96. He was given the nickname Mr. Playoff as he scored ten goals during the 1996 Stanley Cup Playoffs. After five seasons in Florida, he was traded to the San Jose Sharks near the beginning of the 1997–98 season, along with a first-round pick in the 1998 NHL entry draft (Vincent Lecavalier) for Viktor Kozlov and a fifth round pick (Jaroslav Špaček) also in the 1998 draft.

After three seasons in San Jose, Lowry went to the Calgary Flames for the 2000–01 season where he played out his last four seasons, with the exception of a stint with the Saint John Flames of the AHL. In his last NHL season, he played 18 games in the regular season, scoring one goal and one assist. In the playoffs, he played 10 games in Calgary's Stanley Cup run of 2004 that ended with a loss to the Tampa Bay Lightning. While playing against the Toronto Maple Leafs, Lowry was involved in a collision with former Maple Leafs captain and franchise icon Doug Gilmour that resulted in Gilmour suffering a torn anterior cruciate ligament (ACL), an injury that effectively ended his NHL career.

== Coaching career ==
After retiring as a player, Lowry began coaching, joining the Western Hockey League's Calgary Hitmen as an assistant coach in 2005. Lowry was promoted to associate coach in 2007 and named the head coach of the Hitmen in 2008, succeeding Kelly Kisio. After one season as head coach for the Hitmen, Lowry joined the Calgary Flames in the NHL as an assistant coach beginning in 2009, where he served for three seasons.

On July 19, 2012, Lowry was named the head coach of the Victoria Royals of the WHL. On May 30, 2017, Lowry was hired as an assistant coach for the Los Angeles Kings of the NHL. After two seasons with the Kings, he returned to the WHL as the head coach of the Brandon Wheat Kings.

On November 23, 2020, Lowry was hired as an assistant coach for the Winnipeg Jets, reuniting him with his son Adam. On December 17, 2021, Lowry was named interim head coach of the Jets after head coach Paul Maurice resigned. On September 2, 2025 Lowry was hired as an assistant coach for the Calgary Flames of the NHL. He also served as the associate coach for the Seattle Kraken from 2022-2024.

== Career statistics ==
=== Regular season and playoffs ===
			Regular season					Playoffs
Season	Team	League	GP	G	A	Pts	PIM	GP	G	A	Pts	PIM
1981–82	Nepean Raiders Midget AAA	OEMHL	60	50	64	114	46	—	—	—	—	—
1982–83	London Knights	OHL	42	11	16	27	48	3	0	0	0	14
1983–84	London Knights	OHL	66	29	47	76	125	8	6	6	12	41
1984–85	London Knights	OHL	61	60	60	120	94	8	6	5	11	10
1985–86	Vancouver Canucks	NHL	73	10	8	18	143	3	0	0	0	0
1986–87	Vancouver Canucks	NHL	70	8	10	18	176	—	—	—	—	—
1987–88	Fredericton Express	AHL	46	18	27	45	59	14	7	3	10	72
1987–88	Vancouver Canucks	NHL	22	1	3	4	38	—	—	—	—	—
1988–89	Peoria Rivermen	IHL	58	31	35	66	45	—	—	—	—	—
1988–89	St. Louis Blues	NHL	21	3	3	6	11	10	0	5	5	4
1989–90	St. Louis Blues	NHL	78	19	6	25	75	12	2	1	3	39
1990–91	St. Louis Blues	NHL	79	19	21	40	168	13	1	4	5	35
1991–92	St. Louis Blues	NHL	75	7	13	20	77	6	0	1	1	20
1992–93	St. Louis Blues	NHL	58	5	8	13	101	11	2	0	2	14
1993–94	Florida Panthers	NHL	80	15	22	37	64	—	—	—	—	—
1994–95	Florida Panthers	NHL	45	10	10	20	25	—	—	—	—	—
1995–96	Florida Panthers	NHL	63	10	14	24	36	22	10	7	17	39
1996–97	Florida Panthers	NHL	77	15	14	29	51	5	0	0	0	0
1997–98	Florida Panthers	NHL	7	0	0	0	2	—	—	—	—	—
1997–98	San Jose Sharks	NHL	50	4	4	8	51	6	0	0	0	18
1998–99	San Jose Sharks	NHL	61	6	9	15	24	1	0	0	0	0
1999–2000	San Jose Sharks	NHL	32	1	4	5	18	12	1	2	3	6
2000–01	Calgary Flames	NHL	79	18	17	35	47	—	—	—	—	—
2001–02	Calgary Flames	NHL	62	7	6	13	51	—	—	—	—	—
2002–03	Saint John Flames	AHL	22	3	6	9	16	—	—	—	—	—
2002–03	Calgary Flames	NHL	34	5	14	19	22	—	—	—	—	—
2003–04	Calgary Flames	NHL	18	1	1	2	11	10	0	0	0	6
NHL totals			1,084	164	187	351	1,191	111	16	20	36	181

== Head coaching record ==
=== NHL ===
Team	Year	Regular season						Postseason			
Team	Year	G	W	L	OTL	Pts	Finish	W	L	Win%	Result
Winnipeg Jets	2021–22	54	26	22	6	58	6th in Central	—	—	—	Missed playoffs

=== WHL ===
Season	Team	League	Regular season							Postseason
Season	Team	League	G	W	L	OTL	SOL	Pts	Division rank	Result
2008–09	Calgary Hitmen	WHL	72	59	9	3	1	122	1st in Central	Lost in WHL Championship (KEL)
2012–13	Victoria Royals	WHL	72	35	30	2	5	77	3rd in B.C.	Lost in Conference Quarterfinals (KAM)
2013–14	Victoria Royals	WHL	72	48	20	1	3	100	2nd in B.C.	Lost in Conference Semifinals (POR)
2014–15	Victoria Royals	WHL	72	39	29	3	1	82	2nd in B.C.	Lost in Conference Semifinals (KEL)
2015–16	Victoria Royals	WHL	72	50	16	3	3	106	1st in B.C.	Lost in Conference Semifinals (KEL)
2016–17	Victoria Royals	WHL	72	37	29	5	1	80	4th in B.C.	Lost in Conference Quarterfinals (EVT)
2019–20	Brandon Wheat Kings	WHL	63	35	22	0	6	76	3rd in East	Season cancelled
WHL totals			495	303	155	17	20		2 Division titles	35–29 in playoffs

== See also ==
- List of NHL players with 1,000 games played
- Captain (ice hockey)

Sporting positions
Preceded by Steve Smith	Calgary Flames captain 2000–02	Succeeded by Bob Boughner; Craig Conroy
Preceded by Paul Maurice	Head coach of the Winnipeg Jets (Interim); 2021–22	Succeeded by Rick Bowness
