= Jacques Beaulieu (ice hockey) =

Canadian ice hockey coach

- Born: April 1, 1968 (age 57) Strathroy, Ontario, Canada
- Position: Head Coach
- Playing career: 2002–2013

Jacques Beaulieu (born April 1, 1968) is a Canadian ice hockey coach. He is the former head coach and general manager for the Sarnia Sting of the Ontario Hockey League (OHL)

Beaulieu is the father of former National Hockey League (NHL) defenseman Nathan Beaulieu whom he coached early in the latter's major junior hockey career with the Saint John Sea Dogs of the Quebec Major Junior Hockey League (QMJHL). Following the 2007–08 season, he was awarded the Maurice Filion Trophy as the QMJHL's General Manager of the Year.

== Personal life ==
On April 27, 2013, Beaulieu—along with his son Nathan—were involved in an altercation in their hometown of Strathroy, Ontario. The incident in question took place following a charity golf tournament at a private residence and stemmed from property damages by the Beaulieus. As a result, two people were assaulted and suffered minor injuries. In August 2013, Beaulieu and his son pleaded guilty to assault. Each was assessed penalties of conditional discharges with nine months' probation, a joint recommendation from the Crown and the defence.

Awards and achievements
Preceded by Pascal Vincent	Maurice Filion Trophy; 2007–08	Succeeded by Dominic Ricard
