= Claude Noël =

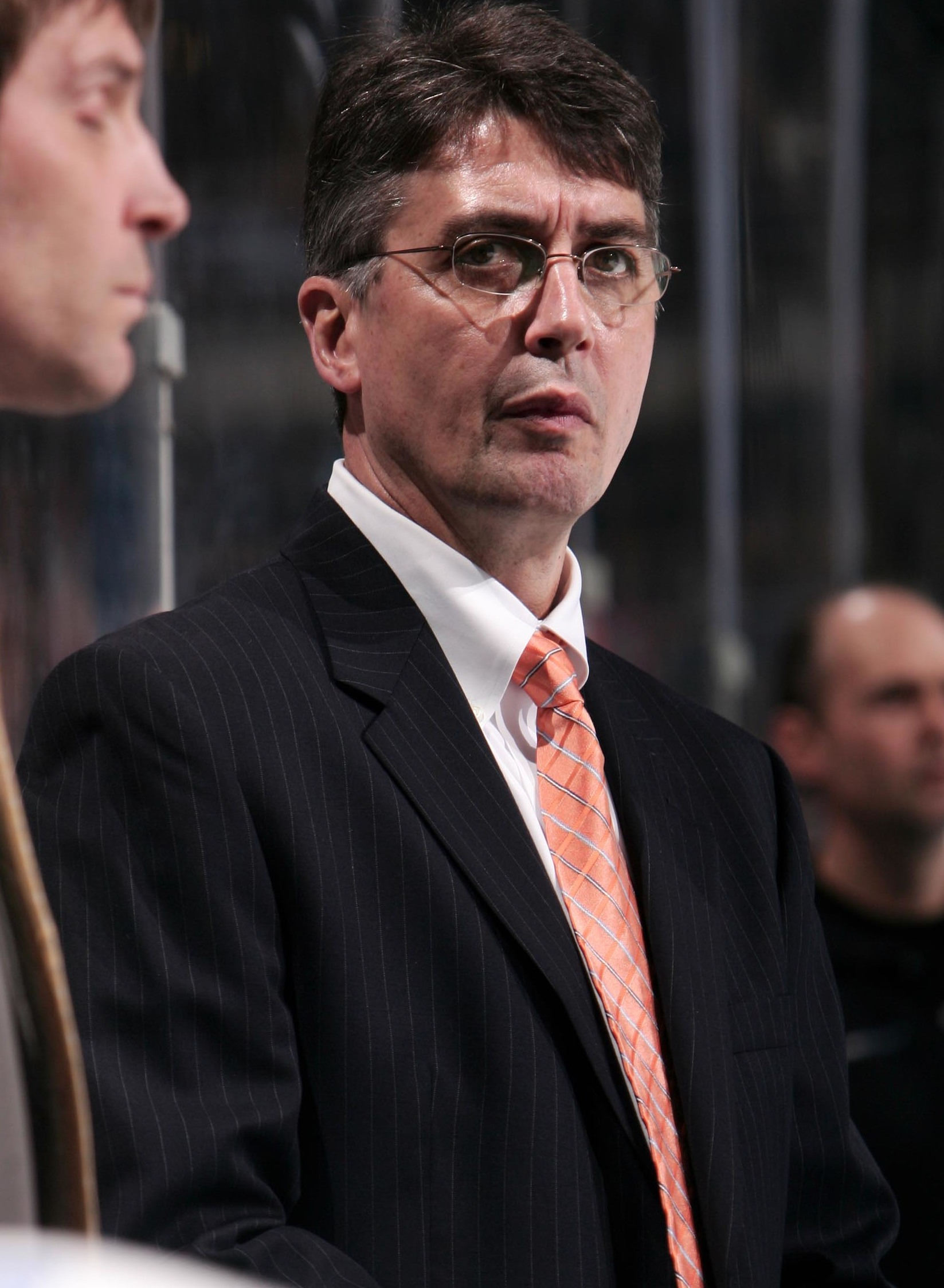
- Noël in 2006
- Born: October 31, 1955 (age 70) Kirkland Lake, Ontario, Canada
- Played for: Washington Capitals; SC Bern
- Coached for: Vancouver Giants (WHL); Winnipeg Jets (NHL); Manitoba Moose (AHL); Columbus Blue Jackets (NHL); Milwaukee Admirals (AHL/IHL); Toledo Storm (ECHL); Michigan K-Wings (IHL); Dayton Bombers (ECHL); Roanoke Valley Rebels (ECHL)
- Playing career: 1976–1988

Claude Noël (born October 31, 1955) is a Canadian professional ice hockey former player and coach. He most recently worked as a scout with the New Jersey Devils of the National Hockey League (NHL). Noël has close to 30 years experience coaching with his most recent coaching position being head coach of the Vancouver Giants of the Western Hockey League in the 2014–15 season. He played 7 games in the NHL with the Washington Capitals during the 1979–80 season. The rest of his playing career, which lasted from 1976 to 1988, was mainly spent in the minor leagues.

== Playing career ==
Noël was undrafted after playing 1974–75 with the Kitchener Rangers, but he was signed as a professional with the Buffalo Norsemen of the North American Hockey League (NAHL), starting a long minor league playing career. The next season, he moved up to the American Hockey League (AHL) with the Hershey Bears. He stayed with the Bears until 1981, earning one call-up to the Washington Capitals in the 1979–80 season of seven games. After Hershey he played with several teams in the International Hockey League: Toledo Goaldiggers, Kalamazoo Wings and Milwaukee Admirals before retiring in 1988. While with the Buffalo Norsemen, his team ended up involved in what is now considered to be an infamous pre game brawl with the Johnstown Jets. The events of this brawl and subsequent forfeited game would form the basis of a memorable scene between the Charleston Chiefs and the Peterboro Patriots in the cult film Slap Shot. Claude Noel confirmed that he was on the ice for that event during a press conference on November 16, 2011.

== Coaching career ==
After his professional playing career, Noël moved into coaching. He began in the East Coast Hockey League, spending one season as head coach of the Roanoke Valley Rebels then two seasons as head coach of the Dayton Bombers. Noël moved to the International Hockey League's Kalamazoo Wings (later the renamed the Michigan K-Wings), spending two seasons as assistant coach and two seasons as head coach. From there, Noël moved on to take an assistant coaching job with the Milwaukee Admirals also of the IHL and later the American Hockey League. After three seasons in Milwaukee, Noël went back to the ECHL for one season as the head coach of the Toledo Storm.

In 2003, Noël returned to the Admirals as head coach. In his first season, the Admirals won the Calder Cup. Noël was awarded the Louis A. Pieri Memorial Award as Coach of the Year. Noël spent three more seasons in Milwaukee, leading the team to winning record each season.

In 2007, Noël was hired by Ken Hitchcock and the Columbus Blue Jackets as an assistant coach. On February 3, 2010, Noël was named interim head coach of the Columbus Blue Jackets, after Ken Hitchcock was relieved of his coaching duties. The team went 10–8–6 under Noël, but his contract was not renewed at the end of the season.

On June 18, 2010, Noël was offered the head coaching position for the Vancouver Canucks AHL affiliate, the Manitoba Moose. Noël was officially introduced to the media as the new head coach of the Manitoba Moose on June 21, 2010. Coincidentally, Columbus hired Scott Arniel, Manitoba's former coach, for the head coach job in Columbus.

The return of the NHL to Winnipeg forced the Moose to relocate in June 2011. True North Sports and Entertainment, owners of both the new Winnipeg NHL team and the Moose, received permission from the Canucks to interview Noël for their vacant head coaching job. On June 24, Noël was named the head coach of the Winnipeg Jets. He was fired on January 12, 2014 and replaced by former Carolina Hurricanes and Toronto Maple Leafs head coach Paul Maurice. On November 30, 2014, Noël was announced as the head coach of the WHL Vancouver Giants. He coached the team for the remainder of the season before a mutual parting of ways at the season's conclusion.

On August 4, 2015, Noël was named as a pro scout of the NHL New Jersey Devils.

== Personal ==
Born in Kirkland Lake, Ontario, Noël was raised in McGarry and North Bay. He and his wife Lynda have two sons, Chris and Sheldon.

== Career statistics ==
=== Regular season and playoffs ===
			Regular season					Playoffs
Season	Team	League	GP	G	A	Pts	PIM	GP	G	A	Pts	PIM
1973–74	North Bay Trappers	OPJAHL	44	19	43	62	35	—	—	—	—	—
1974–75	Kitchener Rangers	OMJHL	70	14	37	51	28	—	—	—	—	—
1975–76	Buffalo Norsemen	NAHL	74	19	42	61	27	4	1	1	2	2
1976–77	Hershey Bears	AHL	80	14	32	46	19	6	2	1	3	0
1977–78	Hershey Bears	AHL	65	13	25	38	18	—	—	—	—	—
1978–79	Hershey Bears	AHL	76	30	50	80	27	4	1	4	5	0
1979–80	Washington Capitals	NHL	7	0	0	0	0	—	—	—	—	—
1979–80	Hershey Bears	AHL	68	24	38	62	18	16	9	10	19	6
1980–81	Hershey Bears	AHL	64	14	44	58	50	10	2	2	4	14
1981–82	SC Bern	NLA	26	12	13	25	40	—	—	—	—	—
1982–83	Toledo Goaldiggers	IHL	82	42	82	124	41	11	3	15	18	4
1983–84	Salzburger EC	AUT-2	26	32	47	79	28	—	—	—	—	—
1984–85	Toledo Goaldiggers	IHL	74	16	56	72	30	6	1	2	3	2
1985–86	Toledo Goaldiggers	IHL	12	1	7	8	4	—	—	—	—	—
1985–86	Kalamazoo Wings	IHL	71	15	38	53	18	6	2	4	6	2
1986–87	Kalamazoo Wings	IHL	80	33	37	70	28	5	1	2	3	0
1987–88	Milwaukee Admirals	IHL	56	8	34	42	18	—	—	—	—	—
AHL totals			353	95	189	284	132	36	14	17	31	20
IHL totals			375	115	254	369	139	28	7	23	30	8
NHL totals			7	0	0	0	0	—	—	—	—	—

=== NHL coaching record ===
Team	Year	Regular Season					Post Season			
Team	Year	Games	Won	Lost	OTL	Points	Finish	Won	Lost	Result
Columbus Blue Jackets	2009–10	24	10	8	6	(79)	5th in Central Division	—	—	Missed playoffs
Winnipeg Jets	2011–12	82	37	35	10	84	4th in Southeast Division	—	—	Missed playoffs
Winnipeg Jets	2012–13	48	24	21	3	51	2nd in Southeast Division	—	—	Missed playoffs
Winnipeg Jets	2013–14	47	19	23	5	43	(fired)	—	—	—
NHL totals		201	90	87	24	.507	—	—	—	—

Preceded by Ken Hitchcock	Head coach of the Columbus Blue Jackets; 2010 (interim)	Succeeded by Scott Arniel
Preceded by Craig Ramsay (Atlanta Thrashers)	Head coach of the Winnipeg Jets; 2011–14	Succeeded by Paul Maurice
Preceded by Scott Arniel	Head Coaches of the Manitoba Moose; 2010–11	Succeeded by Keith McCambridge (St. John's IceCaps)
