= Roanoke Valley Rebels (ECHL) =

- City: Vinton, Virginia
- League: ECHL
- Division: East
- Founded: 1981 (In the CHL)
- Operated: 1990–1992
- Home arena: LancerLot Sports Complex
- Colors: Blue, red, white
- Owner: Henry Brabham
- Head coach: Claude Noel (1990-91); Roy Sommer (1991-92)

Franchise history
- 1981–1983: Nashville South Stars
- 1983–1990: Virginia Lancers
- 1990–1992: Roanoke Valley Rebels
- 1992–1993: Roanoke Valley Rampage
- 1993–1994: Huntsville Blast
- 1994–2001: Tallahassee Tiger Sharks
- 2001–2002: Macon Whoopee
- 2002–2003: Lexington Men O' War
- 2005–2026: Utah Grizzlies
- 2026-present: Trenton Ironhawks

The Roanoke Valley Rebels were a minor league hockey franchise in the ECHL from 1990–92. The Rebels played their games at the LancerLot in Vinton, Virginia. The Rebels played from 1983–90 as the Virginia Lancers and were renamed the Roanoke Valley Rampage after the 1991–92 season.

After two seasons of playing as the Rebels, owner Henry Brabham would sell the team to Larry Revo, and he would rename the team the Roanoke Valley Rampage.

== Season-by-season results ==
Season	Games	Won	Lost	Tied	Points	GF	GA	PIM	Playoffs
1990–91	64	26	31	7	59	218	295	2006	Did not qualify
1991–92	64	21	36	7	49	236	313	2053	Lost In Round 1

== Notable personnel ==
- Claude Noel – Rebels head coach, 1990–91 season. Won the 2004 Calder Cup as head coach with the Milwaukee Admirals, interim Columbus Blue Jackets head coach in 2010, and first post-relocation head coach of the second Winnipeg Jets franchise 2011 to 2014.
