= List of Columbus Blue Jackets head coaches =

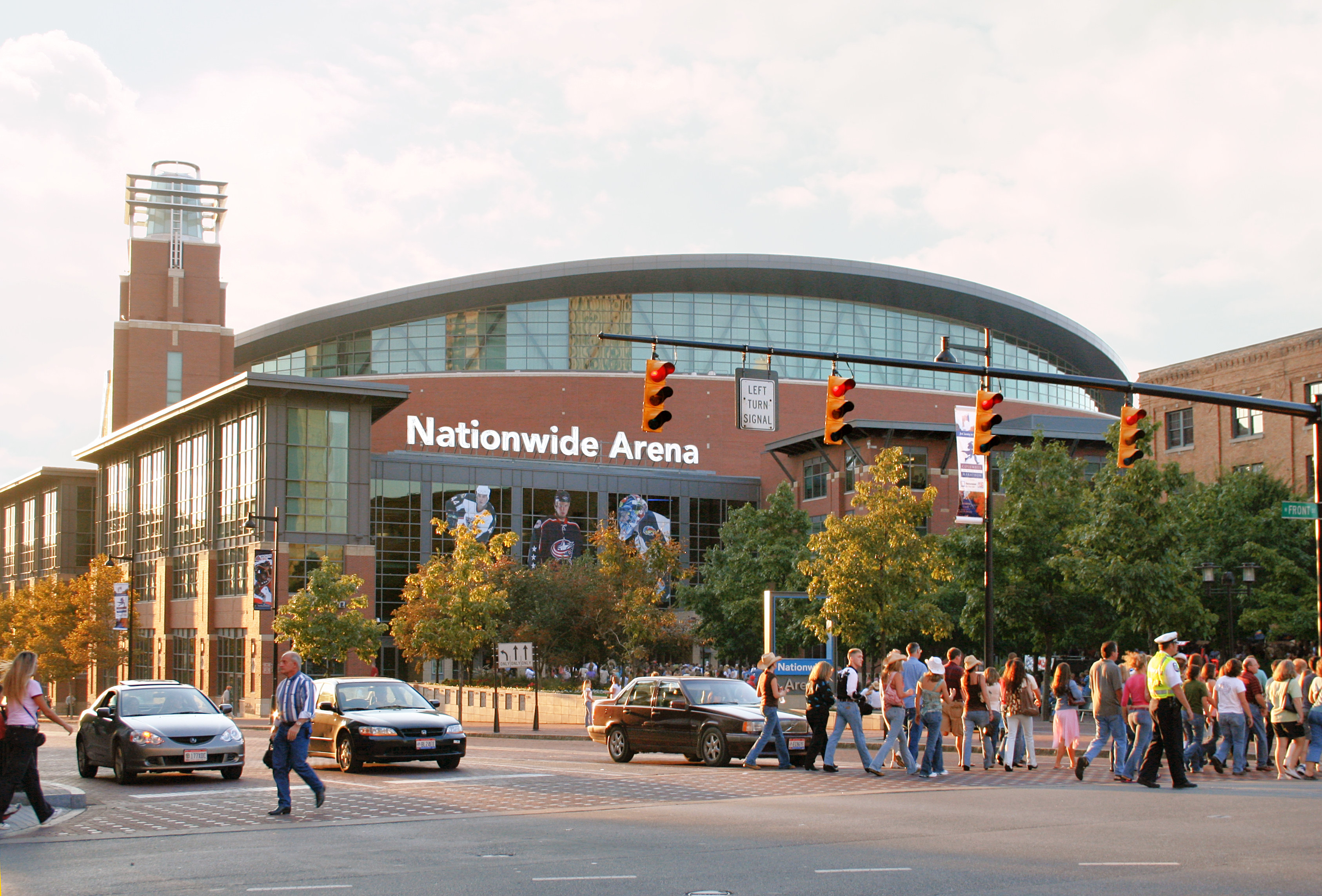
The Blue Jackets have played their home games at the Nationwide Arena since their inaugural season.

The Columbus Blue Jackets are an American professional ice hockey team based in Columbus, Ohio. They play in the Metropolitan Division of the Eastern Conference in the National Hockey League (NHL). The team joined the NHL in 2000 as an expansion team. The Blue Jackets have played their home games at the Nationwide Arena since their inaugural season. The franchise is owned by John P. McConnell and Don Waddell is their general manager.

There have been 12 full-time head coaches for the Blue Jackets franchise. The team's first head coach was Dave King, who coached for three seasons. Ken Hitchcock coached the team to its first playoff appearance. Scott Arniel was the head coach of the Blue Jackets from 2010 through 2012. Todd Richards was named interim head coach on January 9, 2012, and would remain with the team for more than 3½ seasons. John Tortorella became the head coach on October 21, 2015, and left the team following the 2020–21 season with the Blue Jackets' highest winning percentage (.568). Tortorella was replaced by Brad Larsen, who served as head coach for two years before being fired at the conclusion of the 2022–23 season. Mike Babcock was subsequently hired to replace Larsen; however, Babcock resigned before coaching a game for Columbus, after allegations of improper behavior via the Spittin' Chiclets podcast led to an NHLPA investigation. After Babcock's resignation, Pascal Vincent was subsequently named head coach. Vincent was subsequently fired after just one season as head coach, later being replaced by Dean Evason. Following just a season and a half as head coach, Evason himself was fired, being replaced by Rick Bowness.

== Key ==
#	Number of coaches (Note: A running total of the number of coaches of the Blue Jackets. Thus, any coach who has two or more separate terms as head coach is only counted once.)
GC	Games coached
W	Wins = 2 points
L	Losses = 0 points
T	Ties = 1 point
OT	Overtime/shootout losses = 1 point (Note: Before the 2005–06 season, the NHL instituted a penalty shootout for regular season games that remained tied after a five-minute overtime period, which prevented ties.)
PTS	Points
Win%	Winning percentage
*	Spent entire NHL head coaching career with the Blue Jackets

== Coaches ==
Note: Statistics are correct through the end of the 2025–26 season.

#	Name	Term (Note: Each year is linked to an article about that particular NHL season.)	Regular season						Playoffs				Achievements	Ref
#	Name	Term	GC	W	L	T/OT	Pts	Win%	GC	W	L	Win%	Achievements	Ref
1	Dave King	2000–2003	204	64	106	34	162	.397	—	—	—	—		
2	Doug MacLean	2003–2004	79	24	43	12	60	.380	—	—	—	—		
3	Gerard Gallant	2004–2006	142	56	76	10	122	.430	—	—	—	—		
—	Gary Agnew*	2006	5	0	4	1	1	.100	—	—	—	—		
4	Ken Hitchcock	2006–2010	284	125	123	36	286	.504	4	0	4	.000		
—	Claude Noel	2010	24	10	8	6	26	.542	—	—	—	—		
5	Scott Arniel	2010–2012	123	45	60	18	108	.439	—	—	—	—		
6	Todd Richards	2012–2015	260	127	112	21	275	.529	6	2	4	.333		
7	John Tortorella	2015–2021	447	227	166	54	508	.568	31	13	18	.419	Jack Adams Award (2016–17)	
8	Brad Larsen*	2021–2023	164	62	86	16	140	.427	—	—	—	—		
9	Mike Babcock	2023 (Note: Babcock resigned two and a half months after being named head coach, without coaching a game for the Blue Jackets.)	—	—	—	—	—	—	—	—	—	—		
10	Pascal Vincent*	2023–2024	82	27	43	12	66	.402	—	—	—	—		
11	Dean Evason	2024–2026	127	59	52	16	134	.528	—	—	—	—		
12	Rick Bowness	2026–present	37	21	11	5	47	.635	—	—	—	—		
