= Scott Arniel =

Canadian ice hockey player and coach

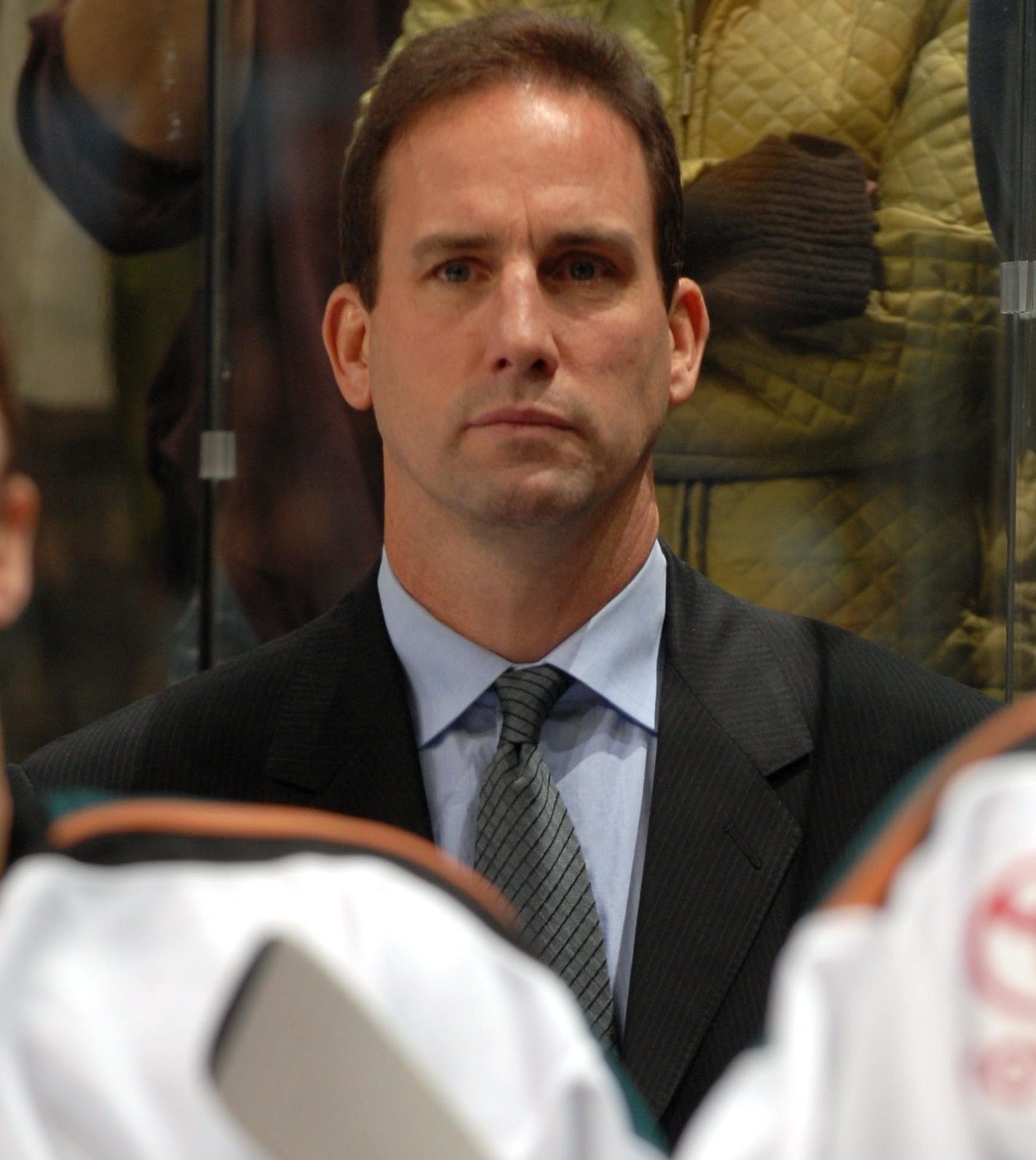
- Arniel in 2006
- Born: September 17, 1962 (age 64) Kingston, Ontario, Canada
- Height: 6 ft 1 in (185 cm)
- Weight: 190 lb (86 kg; 13 st 8 lb)
- Position: Left wing
- Shot: Left
- Played for: Winnipeg Jets; Buffalo Sabres; Boston Bruins
- Current NHL coach: Winnipeg Jets
- Coached for: Columbus Blue Jackets
- NHL draft: 22nd overall, 1981; Winnipeg Jets
- Playing career: 1981–1999
- Coaching career: 1995–present

Scott William Arniel (born September 17, 1962) is a Canadian professional ice hockey coach and former player who is the head coach for the Winnipeg Jets of the National Hockey League (NHL). Previously, he was the head coach of the Columbus Blue Jackets and associate coach of the New York Rangers, Washington Capitals and Winnipeg Jets. As a player, he played as left winger for the original Jets franchise, as well as the Buffalo Sabres and Boston Bruins.

== Playing career ==
=== Junior career ===
After entering the major junior ranks with the Kingston Canadians of the Ontario Major Junior Hockey League (OMJHL) in 1978–79, Arniel switched to the Quebec Major Junior Hockey League the next season to join the Cornwall Royals. Arniel played a pivotal role in the club's 1981 Memorial Cup championship with a hat trick in an 8–2 win over the Kitchener Rangers on May 10, 1981.

=== Professional career ===
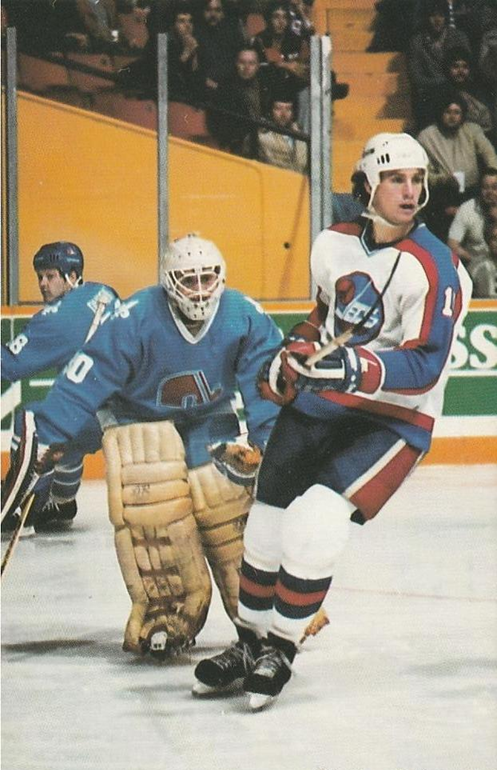
Arniel with the Winnipeg Jets in 1983

That off-season, he was selected by the Winnipeg Jets 22nd overall in the 1981 NHL entry draft and immediately began playing for the team, making his NHL debut in 1981–82, appearing in 17 games. He was, however, returned to junior with the Royals, who had been realigned in the Ontario Hockey League (OHL), later that season. The reassignment to junior allowed Arniel to play at the 1982 World Junior Championships, helping Team Canada to their first-ever gold medal at the tournament.

In 1982–83, Arniel joined the Jets full-time and recorded 18 points in his rookie season. He went on to play five seasons in his initial stint with the Jets, including a career-high 56-point campaign with the team in 1983–84. He joined the Buffalo Sabres in 1986–87, going on to play four seasons with Buffalo, before returning to the Jets in 1990–91.

After splitting the 1991–92 season between the Boston Bruins and the New Haven Nighthawks and Maine Mariners of the American Hockey League (AHL), Arniel played the remainder of his career in the minor leagues, spending time with the San Diego Gulls, Houston Aeros, Utah Grizzlies and Manitoba Moose of the International Hockey League (IHL). He retired following the 1998–99 season.

== Coaching career ==
Arniel began his coaching career as an assistant coach in 1995 while still playing for the Houston Aeros of the IHL as a mid-season replacement. After retiring as a player in 1999, he joined the coaching staff of the Manitoba Moose as an assistant. He held that position for three years until 2002 when he was named to the Buffalo Sabres' coaching staff as an assistant.

After four years with the Sabres, Arniel returned to the Moose as their new head coach when he was hired by their parent club, the Vancouver Canucks. Arniel led the team to the league's best regular season record in 2008–09 and a berth in the Calder Cup finals, earning him the Louis A. R. Pieri Memorial Award as coach of the year.

Arniel returned to the National Hockey League as a head coach in 2010, when he was hired by the Columbus Blue Jackets. Arniel replaced interim coach Claude Noël, who coincidentally was hired as his replacement in Manitoba. After only one and a half seasons behind the Blue Jackets' bench, Arniel was fired in January 2012.

In June 2012, the Canucks rehired Arniel to coach the Chicago Wolves, their new AHL affiliate. In the summer of 2013, Arniel left the Canucks organization, along with head coach Alain Vigneault, to join the New York Rangers. On April 7, 2018, Arniel was fired along with head coach Alain Vigneault and assistant coach Darryl Williams. On August 6, 2018, reigning Stanley Cup champions, the Washington Capitals, hired Arniel as an assistant coach to replace Lane Lambert.

On May 24, 2024, Arniel was named head coach of the Winnipeg Jets, replacing Rick Bowness. The 2024–25 season, his inaugural year as coach, would prove the most successful in franchise history to that point. The Jets finished with a 56–22–4 record, receiving the Presidents' Trophy as the best team of the regular season. Arniel was named a finalist for the Jack Adams Award, given annually to the NHL's best coach, in recognition of his work.

== Personal life ==
Arniel was inducted into the Kingston and District Sports Hall of Fame on May 2, 2008. Arniel and his wife Lia have two children and make their home in Winnipeg during the off-season.

He has a nephew, Jamie Arniel, who was drafted by the Boston Bruins and played one game for the team during the 2010–11 NHL season.

== Awards ==
- Kingston and District Sports Hall of Fame, inducted May 2, 2008.
- Louis A. R. Pieri Memorial Award (AHL coach of the year), 2009.

== Career statistics ==
=== Regular season and playoffs ===
			Regular season					Playoffs
Season	Team	League	GP	G	A	Pts	PIM	GP	G	A	Pts	PIM
1978–79	Kingston Canadians	OMJHL	—	—	—	—	—	3	0	1	1	0
1979–80	Cornwall Royals	OMJHL	61	22	28	50	49	18	6	6	12	24
1980–81	Cornwall Royals	OHL	68	52	71	123	102	19	14	19	33	24
1981–82	Cornwall Royals	OHL	24	18	26	44	43	—	—	—	—	—
1981–82	Winnipeg Jets	NHL	17	1	8	9	14	3	0	0	0	0
1982–83	Winnipeg Jets	NHL	75	13	5	18	46	2	0	0	0	0
1983–84	Winnipeg Jets	NHL	80	21	35	56	68	2	0	0	0	5
1984–85	Winnipeg Jets	NHL	79	22	22	44	81	8	1	2	3	9
1985–86	Winnipeg Jets	NHL	80	18	25	43	40	3	0	0	0	12
1986–87	Buffalo Sabres	NHL	63	11	14	25	59	—	—	—	—	—
1987–88	Buffalo Sabres	NHL	73	17	23	40	61	6	0	1	1	5
1988–89	Buffalo Sabres	NHL	80	18	23	41	46	5	1	0	1	4
1989–90	Buffalo Sabres	NHL	79	18	14	32	77	5	1	0	1	4
1990–91	Winnipeg Jets	NHL	75	5	17	22	87	—	—	—	—	—
1991–92	New Haven Nighthawks	AHL	11	3	3	6	10	—	—	—	—	—
1991–92	Boston Bruins	NHL	29	5	3	8	20	—	—	—	—	—
1991–92	Maine Mariners	AHL	14	4	4	8	8	—	—	—	—	—
1992–93	San Diego Gulls	IHL	79	35	48	83	116	14	6	5	11	16
1993–94	San Diego Gulls	IHL	79	34	43	77	121	7	6	3	9	24
1994–95	Houston Aeros	IHL	72	37	40	77	102	4	1	0	1	10
1995–96	Houston Aeros	IHL	64	18	28	46	94	—	—	—	—	—
1995–96	Utah Grizzlies	IHL	14	3	3	6	29	22	10	7	17	28
1996–97	Manitoba Moose	IHL	73	23	27	50	67	—	—	—	—	—
1997–98	Manitoba Moose	IHL	79	28	42	70	84	3	1	0	1	10
1998–99	Manitoba Moose	IHL	70	16	35	51	82	5	1	2	3	0
NHL totals			730	149	189	338	599	34	3	3	6	39
IHL totals			530	194	266	460	695	55	25	17	42	88

=== International ===
Year	Team	Event	GP	G	A	Pts	PIM
1981	Canada	WJC	5	3	1	4	4
1982	Canada	WJC	7	5	6	11	4
Junior totals			12	8	7	15	8

== Head coaching record ==
=== NHL ===
Team	Year	Regular season						Postseason			
Team	Year	G	W	L	OTL	Pts	Finish	W	L	Win%	Result
CBJ	2010–11	82	34	35	13	81	4th in Central	—	—	—	Missed playoffs
CBJ	2011–12	41	11	25	5	(27)	(fired)	—	—	—	—
CBJ total		123	45	60	18			—	—	—	
WPG	2024–25	82	56	22	4	116	1st in Central	6	7	.462	Lost in second round (DAL)
WPG	2025–26	82	35	35	12	82	7th in Central	—	—	—	Missed playoffs
WPG total		164	91	57	16			6	7	.462	1 playoff appearance
Total		287	136	117	34			6	7	.462	1 playoff appearance

=== AHL ===
Team	Year	Regular season						Postseason
Team	Year	G	W	L	OTL	Pts	Finish	Result
MTB	2006–07	80	45	23	12	102	1st in North	Lost in second round
MTB	2007–08	80	46	27	7	99	3rd in North	Lost in first round
MTB	2008–09	80	50	23	7	107	1st in North	Lost in Calder Cup Finals
MTB	2009–10	80	40	33	7	87	4th in North	Lost in first round
CHI	2012–13	76	37	30	9	83	4th in Midwest	Did not qualify
Total		396	218	136	42			4 playoff appearances

Sporting positions
Preceded by Claude Noël	Head coach of the Columbus Blue Jackets; 2010–2012	Succeeded by Todd Richards
Preceded by Rick Bowness	Head coach of the Winnipeg Jets; 2024–present	Incumbent
