= List of Winnipeg Jets (1972–1996) head coaches =

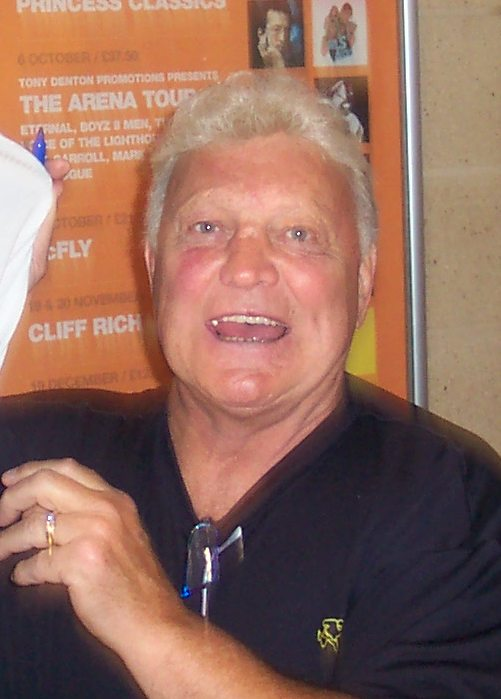
Bobby Hull, Winnipeg's first coach

The Winnipeg Jets were an ice hockey team who played in both the National Hockey League (NHL) and the World Hockey Association (WHA). This is a list of the head coaches they had during their existence. The franchise moved to Phoenix, Arizona in 1996 and became the Arizona Coyotes.

John Paddock coached the most games, with 106 wins, 138 losses, and 249 points.

== Key ==
General
#	Number of coaches (Note: A running total of the number of coaches of the Jets. Thus, any coach who have two or more separate terms as head coach is only counted once.)
*	Spent entire WHA and NHL coaching career with the Jets
†	Elected to the Hockey Hall of Fame as a builder
Achievements	Achievements during their Jets head coaching tenure

Regular-season
GC	Games coached	T	Ties = 1 point
W	Wins = 2 points	PTS	Points
L	Losses = 0 points	W%	Winning percentage

Playoffs
PGC	Games coached
PW	Wins
PL	Losses
PW%	Winning percentage

== Head coaches ==
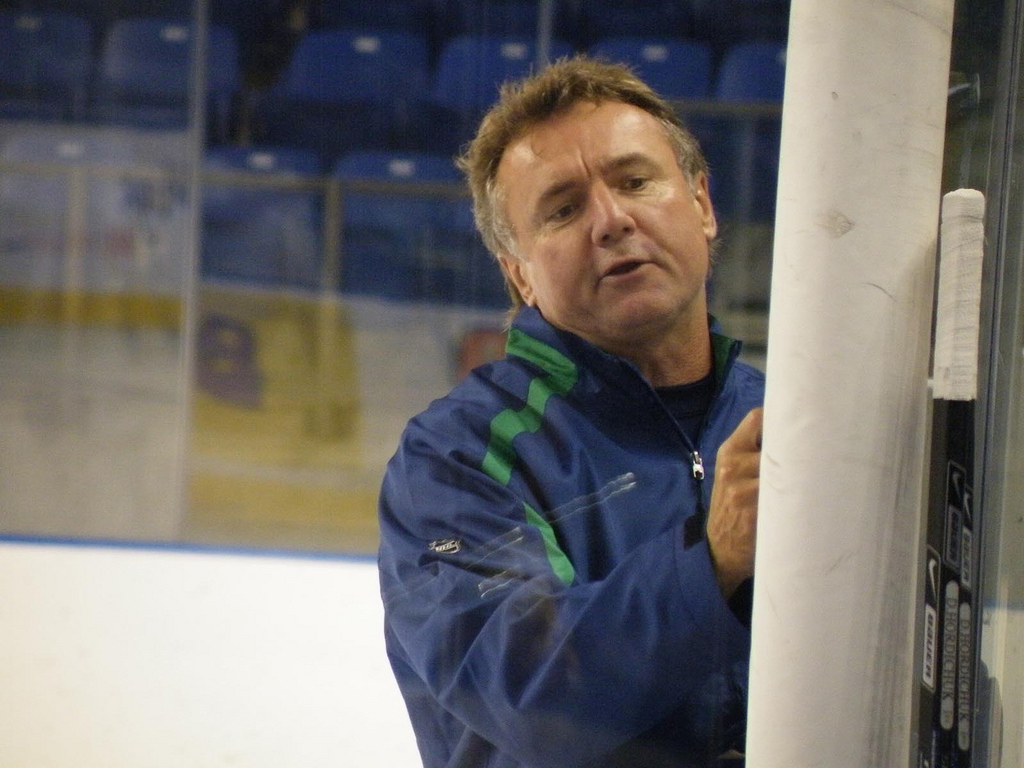
Rick Bowness

#	Name	Term (Note: Each year is linked to an article about that particular WHA or NHL season.)	GC	W	L	T	PTS	W%	PGC	PW	PL	PW%	Achievements	Reference
1	Bobby Hull*	1972–1974	156	77	70	9	163	.522	18	9	9	.500		
2	Rudy Pilous†	1974–1975	37	18	17	2	38	.514	—	—	—	—		
—	Bobby Hull*	1975	13	4	9	0	8	.308	—	—	—	—		
—	Rudy Pilous†	1975	28	16	9	3	35	.625	—	—	—	—		
3	Bobby Kromm	1975–1977	161	98	59	4	200	.621	33	23	10	.697	Robert Schmertz Memorial Trophy winner (1976); Avco World Trophy championship (1976)	
4	Larry Hillman*	1977–1979	141	78	55	8	164	.582	9	8	1	.889	Avco World Trophy championship (1978)	
5	Tom McVie	1979–1980	96	30	55	11	71	.370	10	8	2	.800	Avco World Trophy championship (1979)	
6	Bill Sutherland*	1980	3	2	1	0	4	.666	—	—	—	—		
—	Tom McVie	1980	28	1	20	7	9	.161	—	—	—	—		
—	Bill Sutherland*	1980–1981	29	6	20	3	15	.259	—	—	—	—		
7	Mike Smith*	1981	23	2	17	4	8	.174	—	—	—	—		
8	Tom Watt	1981–1983	181	72	85	24	168	.464	7	1	6	.143		
9	Barry Long*	1983–1986	205	87	93	25	199	.485	11	3	8	.273		
10	John Ferguson*	1986	14	7	6	1	15	.536	3	0	3	.000		
11	Dan Maloney	1986–1989	212	91	93	28	210	.495	15	5	10	.333		
12	Rick Bowness	1989	28	8	17	3	19	.339	—	—	—	—		
13	Bob Murdoch	1989–1991	160	63	75	22	148	.463	7	3	4	.429		
14	John Paddock	1991–1995	281	106	138	37	249	.443	13	5	8	.385		
15	Terry Simpson	1995–1996	97	43	47	7	93	.479	6	2	4	.333		
