= Dean Evason =

Canadian ice hockey player and coach

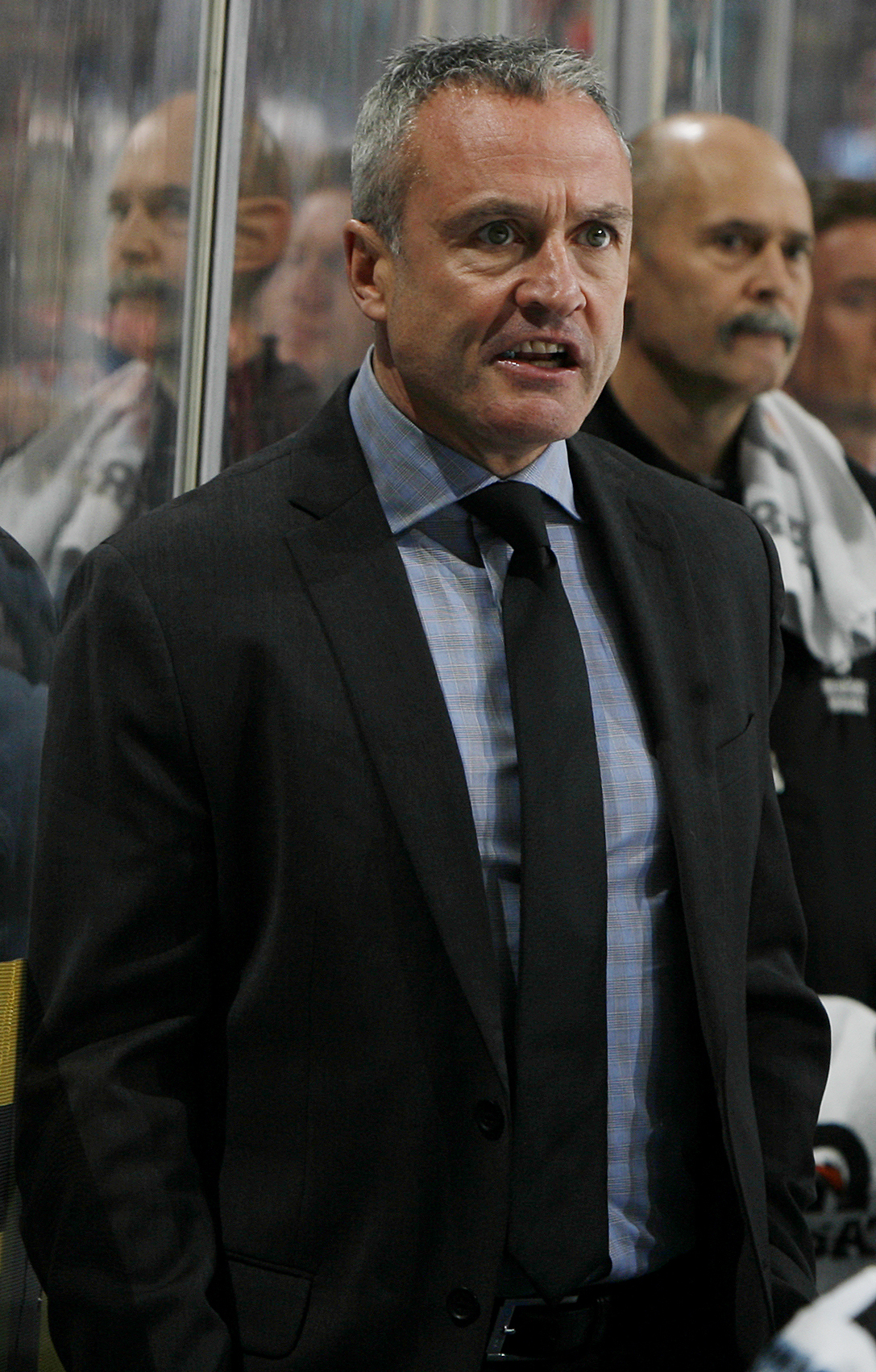
- Evason coaching the Milwaukee Admirals in 2012
- Born: August 22, 1964 (age 61) Flin Flon, Manitoba, Canada
- Height: 5 ft 10 in (178 cm)
- Weight: 175 lb (79 kg; 12 st 7 lb)
- Position: Centre
- Shot: Right
- Played for: Washington Capitals; Hartford Whalers; San Jose Sharks; Dallas Stars; Calgary Flames; EV Zug; EV Landshut
- Coached for: Minnesota Wild; Columbus Blue Jackets
- National team: Canada
- NHL draft: 89th overall, 1982; Washington Capitals
- Playing career: 1983–1999
- Coaching career: 1999–present

Dean Clement Evason (born August 22, 1964) is a Canadian professional ice hockey coach and former player. He previously served as head coach of the Minnesota Wild and Columbus Blue Jackets of the National Hockey League (NHL). Evason was selected by the Washington Capitals in the fifth round (89th overall) of the 1982 NHL entry draft. Evason was born in Flin Flon, Manitoba, but grew up in Brandon, Manitoba.

== Playing career ==
Selected by the Capitals in the 1982 NHL entry draft, Evason played in the NHL from 1983 to 1996 for the Capitals, Hartford Whalers, San Jose Sharks, Dallas Stars, and Calgary Flames. He was most successful as a member of the Hartford Whalers, where he compiled career highs with the team with 87 goals and 165 assists for 261 points. Evason was a 20-goal scorer twice with Hartford and was well known for his ability to get the puck to other players for goals during difficult situations on the ice.

Evason also played in Switzerland, for the Canadian National Team, and in the German Hockey League before retiring as an active player. In 803 NHL games, playing primarily as a defensive-minded forward, he had 139 goals and 233 assists.

== International play ==
Medal record

Men's ice hockey

Representing Canada

World Championships
Gold medal – first place	1997 Finland	

Evason first played for Canada junior team at the 1984 World Junior Championships, while during a terrific campaign for the Kamloops Junior Oilers. His selection to the squad was somewhat of a surprise, but he proved to be a productive player, recording six goals and three assists for nine points in seven games for the fourth-placed Canadian squad. The Canadians narrowly missed out on a medal to the third-placed Czechoslovakia junior team, losing 6–4 in their match against them that decided the medals. It would be 13 additional years before Evason was again selected to represent his country.

His final opportunity occurred in 1997 when Canada senior team's coach Andy Murray offered him a spot on the roster and the captaincy in exchange for playing a full season for the national team, which was then together for 10 months per year. Evason was the only non-NHL player on the Canadian roster during the 1997 World Championships that won their first World Championships in three years, beating Sweden in the final, scoring two goals and adding three assists during the tournament.

== Coaching career ==
Before joining the Capitals as an assistant coach, Evason spent many years in the Western Hockey League in various coaching capacities, starting in 1999 as an assistant with the Calgary Hitmen. He then became the head coach of the Kamloops Blazers from 1999 to 2002 and the Vancouver Giants from 2002 to 2004. He returned to the Hitmen for the 2004–05 season as a co-coach.

In 2005, he was hired by the Washington Capitals as an assistant coach. In 2012, he was hired by the Milwaukee Admirals as head coach, where he served for six seasons to become the team's second-winningest coach in their history. In 2018, he was hired by the Minnesota Wild as an assistant coach. On February 14, 2020, Evason was named interim head coach of the Wild.

On July 13, 2020, the Wild dropped the "interim" tag from Evason's title and named him the fifth full-time head coach in franchise history. After parts of five seasons with the team, the Wild fired Evason on November 27, 2023, after a 5–10–4 start capped by a seven-game losing streak.

On July 22, 2024, Evason was hired as head coach of the Columbus Blue Jackets, succeeding Pascal Vincent. On January 12, 2026, Evason and assistant coach Steve McCarthy were fired by the Blue Jackets, with Evason replaced by Rick Bowness.

== Career statistics ==
=== Regular season and playoffs ===
			Regular season					Playoffs
Season	Team	League	GP	G	A	Pts	PIM	GP	G	A	Pts	PIM
1980–81	Cowichan Valley Capitals	BCJHL	50	20	51	71	39	—	—	—	—	—
1980–81	Spokane Flyers	WHL	3	1	1	2	0	—	—	—	—	—
1981–82	Spokane Flyers	WHL	26	8	14	22	65	—	—	—	—	—
1981–82	Kamloops Junior Oilers	WHL	44	21	55	76	47	4	2	1	3	0
1982–83	Kamloops Junior Oilers	WHL	70	71	93	164	102	7	5	7	12	18
1983–84	Kamloops Junior Oilers	WHL	57	49	88	137	89	17	21	20	41	33
1983–84	Washington Capitals	NHL	2	0	0	0	0	—	—	—	—	—
1984–85	Washington Capitals	NHL	15	3	4	7	2	—	—	—	—	—
1984–85	Hartford Whalers	NHL	2	0	0	0	0	—	—	—	—	—
1984–85	Binghamton Whalers	AHL	65	27	49	76	38	8	3	5	8	9
1985–86	Hartford Whalers	NHL	55	20	28	48	65	10	1	4	5	10
1985–86	Binghamton Whalers	AHL	26	9	17	26	29	—	—	—	—	—
1986–87	Hartford Whalers	NHL	80	22	37	59	67	5	3	2	5	35
1987–88	Hartford Whalers	NHL	77	10	18	28	115	6	1	1	2	2
1988–89	Hartford Whalers	NHL	67	11	17	28	60	4	1	2	3	10
1989–90	Hartford Whalers	NHL	78	18	25	43	138	7	2	2	4	22
1990–91	Hartford Whalers	NHL	75	6	23	29	170	6	0	4	4	29
1991–92	San Jose Sharks	NHL	74	11	15	26	99	—	—	—	—	—
1992–93	San Jose Sharks	NHL	84	12	19	31	132	—	—	—	—	—
1993–94	Dallas Stars	NHL	80	11	33	44	66	9	0	2	2	12
1994–95	Dallas Stars	NHL	47	8	7	15	48	5	1	2	3	12
1995–96	Calgary Flames	NHL	67	7	7	14	38	3	0	1	1	0
1996–97	EV Zug	NLA	3	0	1	1	2	4	0	2	2	4
1997–98	EV Landshut	DEL	42	8	22	30	38	6	0	3	3	18
1998–99	EV Landshut	DEL	45	13	25	38	76	3	0	1	1	2
NHL totals			803	139	233	372	1,000	55	9	20	29	132

== Head coaching record ==
=== WHL ===
Team	Year	Regular season							Postseason			
Team	Year	G	W	L	OTL	SOL	Pts	Finish	W	L	Win%	Result
KAM	1999–00	72	36	30	5	1	78	4th in West	0	4	.000	Lost in first round (SEA)
KAM	2000–01	72	35	28	7	2	79	3rd in West	0	4	.000	Lost in first round (SPK)
KAM	2001–02	72	38	25	5	4	85	1st in B.C.	0	4	.000	Lost in first round (KEL)
VAN	2002–03	72	39	27	5	1	84	2nd in B.C.	2	4	.333	Lost in first round (KOO)
VAN	2003–04	72	34	28	8	2	78	3rd in B.C.	1	4	.200	Lost in first round (VAN)
CGY	2004–05	72	34	23	9	6	83	3rd in Central	7	4	.636	Lost in second round (BDN)
Total		432	216	161	39	16	487		10	24	.294	6 playoff appearances

=== AHL ===
Team	Year	Regular season							Postseason			
Team	Year	G	W	L	OTL	SOL	Pts	Finish	W	L	Win%	Result
MIL	2012–13	76	41	28	4	3	89	2nd in Midwest	1	3	.250	Lost in first round (TEX)
MIL	2013–14	76	39	24	6	7	91	3rd in Midwest	0	3	.000	Lost in first round (TOR)
MIL	2014–15	76	33	28	8	7	81	5th in Midwest	-	-	-	Did not qualify
MIL	2015–16	76	48	23	3	2	101	1st in Central	0	3	.000	Lost in first round (GR)
MIL	2016–17	76	43	26	4	3	95	3rd in Central	0	3	.000	Lost in first round (GR)
MIL	2017–18	76	38	32	4	2	82	6th in Central	-	-	-	Did not qualify
Total		456	242	161	29	24	539		1	12	.077	4 playoff appearances

=== NHL ===
Team	Year	Regular season						Postseason			
Team	Year	G	W	L	OTL	Pts	Finish	W	L	Win%	Result
MIN	2019–20	12*	8	4	0	(16)	6th in Central	1	3	.250	Lost in qualifying round (VAN)
MIN	2020–21	56	35	16	5	75	3rd in West	3	4	.429	Lost in first round (VGK)
MIN	2021–22	82	53	22	7	113	2nd in Central	2	4	.333	Lost in first round (STL)
MIN	2022–23	82	46	25	11	103	3rd in Central	2	4	.333	Lost in first round (DAL)
MIN	2023–24	19	5	10	4	(14)	(fired)	—	—	—	—
MIN total		251	147	77	27			8	15	.348	4 playoff appearances
CBJ	2024–25	82	40	33	9	89	4th in Metropolitan	—	—	—	Missed playoffs
CBJ	2025–26	45	19	19	7	(45)	(fired)	—	—	—	—
CBJ total		127	59	52	16			—	—	—	
Total		378	206	129	43			8	15	.348	4 playoff appearances

- Season shortened due to the COVID-19 pandemic during the 2019–20 season. Playoffs were played in August 2020 with a different format.

== Awards and achievements ==
- WHL West First All-Star Team (1984)
- Honoured member of the Manitoba Hockey Hall of Fame

Sporting positions
Preceded by Ian Herbers	Head coach of the Milwaukee Admirals; 2012–2018	Succeeded by Karl Taylor
Preceded by Bruce Boudreau	Head coach of the Minnesota Wild; 2020–2023	Succeeded by John Hynes
Preceded by Pascal Vincent	Head coach of the Columbus Blue Jackets; 2024–2026	Succeeded by Rick Bowness
