= Bob Murdoch (ice hockey, born 1946) =

Canadian ice hockey player and coach (1946–2023)

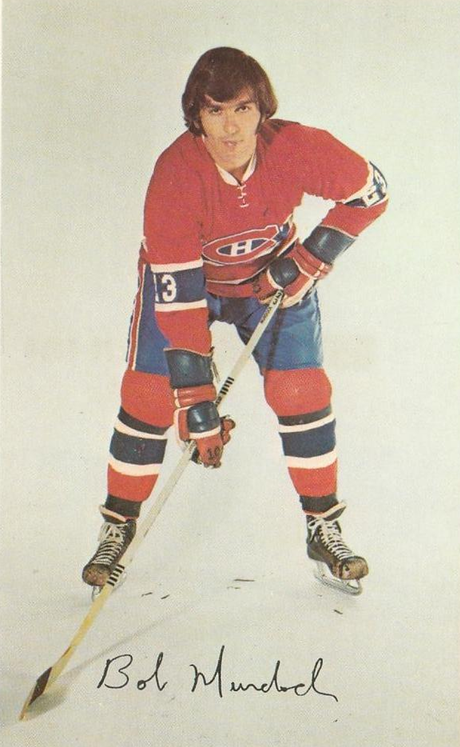
- Murdoch in 1972 photo
- Born: November 20, 1946 Kirkland Lake, Ontario, Canada
- Died: August 3, 2023 (aged 76) Calgary, Alberta, Canada
- Height: 6 ft 0 in (183 cm)
- Weight: 211 lb (96 kg; 15 st 1 lb)
- Position: Defence
- Shot: Right
- Played for: Montreal Canadiens; Los Angeles Kings; Atlanta Flames; Calgary Flames
- Coached for: Chicago Blackhawks; Winnipeg Jets; Maddogs München; Kölner Haie; Nürnberg Ice Tigers
- National team: Canada
- NHL draft: Undrafted
- Playing career: 1970–1982
- Coaching career: 1982–2002

Robert John Murdoch (November 20, 1946 – August 3, 2023) was a Canadian professional ice hockey defenceman and coach.

== Early life ==
Murdoch was born in Kirkland Lake, Ontario, a mining community far from Southern Ontario in Timiskaming District. He grew up in nearby Larder Lake and played organized hockey in this area that saw many players go to the NHL, mainly playing on outdoor rinks. He went to the University of Waterloo where he received a double major degree in Mathematics and Physical Education. He was also captain for the Waterloo Warriors Varsity Ice Hockey team that played in the OUAA. Upon graduation, and undrafted, he played for the Canadian national team in 1968–69 and in 1969–70. He was one of many players affected by the withdrawal of the National Team from participating in the 1970 Ice Hockey World Championships.

== NHL career ==
Murdoch played 12 seasons in the National Hockey League (NHL) for the Montreal Canadiens, Los Angeles Kings, Atlanta Flames and Calgary Flames and coached 10 seasons in the NHL serving as head coach for Chicago Blackhawks and Winnipeg Jets, and also serving as assistant coach for the Calgary Flames and San Jose Sharks. He won the Stanley Cup in 1971 and 1973 while with Montreal.

== Coaching career ==
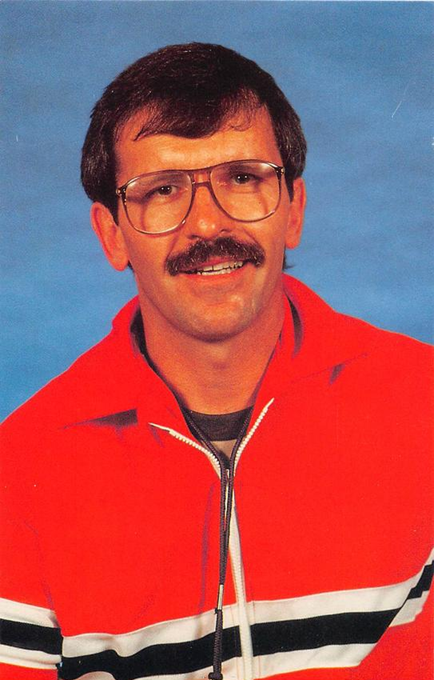
1987 photo of Murdoch as coach of the Chicago Blackhawks

Murdoch coached 80 games with the Chicago Blackhawks during the 1987–88 season, compiling a record of 30–41–9. He was succeeded as Blackhawks head coach by Mike Keenan the following season.

During the 1989–90 season, Murdoch was named the head coach of the Winnipeg Jets. After missing the playoffs the previous season, the Jets went 37–32–11 for 85 points and third in the Smythe Division, making the 1990 Stanley Cup playoffs but losing to the eventual Stanley Cup champion, the Edmonton Oilers, in seven games. Murdoch was seen as an important part of the Jets quick turn around, winning the Jack Adams Award as the NHL's coach of the year.

Despite the success of the previous season, however, the Jets struggled in the 1990–91 season, finishing last in the Smythe Division with a 26–43–11 record, and missing the playoffs. Murdoch was fired at the end of the season and was replaced by John Paddock.

Murdoch would become an associate coach for the San Jose Sharks during the 1991–92 and 1992–93 seasons. Afterwards, he departed for Europe, and coached several teams in Germany's Deutsche Eishockey Liga (DEL), including Munich Mad Dogs, Cologne Sharks, and Nurnberg Ice Tigers, retiring in 2002.

== Later life and death ==
While he was proud of his Northeastern Ontario roots, Murdoch and his family spent summers near Lake of the Woods in Northwestern Ontario. In later years, Canmore, Alberta was home, where he was diagnosed in 2019 with Lewy Body Dementia, and died in Calgary, Alberta on August 3, 2023, at the age of 76. In March 2024, Murdoch's family announced that he was posthumously diagnosed with stage-3 chronic traumatic encephalopathy (CTE).

== Career statistics ==
=== Regular season and playoffs ===
			Regular season					Playoffs
Season	Team	League	GP	G	A	Pts	PIM	GP	G	A	Pts	PIM
1968–69	Winnipeg Nationals	WCSHL	8	0	1	1	2	—	—	—	—	—
1969–70	Montreal Voyageurs	AHL	6	0	2	2	6	—	—	—	—	—
1970–71	Montreal Canadiens	NHL	1	0	2	2	2	2	0	0	0	0
1970–71	Montreal Voyageurs	AHL	66	8	20	28	69	3	1	2	3	4
1971–72	Montreal Canadiens	NHL	11	1	1	2	8	1	0	0	0	0
1971–72	Nova Scotia Voyageurs	AHL	53	7	32	39	53	—	—	—	—	—
1972–73	Montreal Canadiens	NHL	69	2	22	24	55	13	0	3	3	10
1973–74	Los Angeles Kings	NHL	76	8	20	28	85	5	0	0	0	2
1974–75	Los Angeles Kings	NHL	80	13	29	42	116	3	0	1	1	4
1975–76	Los Angeles Kings	NHL	80	6	29	35	103	9	0	5	5	15
1976–77	Los Angeles Kings	NHL	70	9	23	32	79	9	2	3	5	14
1977–78	Los Angeles Kings	NHL	76	2	17	19	68	2	0	1	1	5
1978–79	Los Angeles Kings	NHL	32	3	12	15	46	—	—	—	—	—
1978–79	Atlanta Flames	NHL	35	5	11	16	24	2	0	0	0	4
1979–80	Atlanta Flames	NHL	80	5	16	21	48	4	1	1	2	2
1980–81	Calgary Flames	NHL	74	3	19	22	54	16	1	4	5	36
1981–82	Calgary Flames	NHL	73	3	17	20	76	3	0	0	0	0
NHL totals			757	60	218	278	764	69	4	18	22	92

=== International ===
Year	Team	Event	GP	G	A	Pts	PIM
1969	Canada	WC	5	0	0	0	2
Senior totals			5	0	0	0	2

== Head coaching record ==
Team	Year	Regular season						Postseason			
Team	Year	G	W	L	T	Pts	Finish	W	L	Win %	Result
CHI	1987–88	80	30	41	9	69	3rd in Norris	1	4	.200	Lost in Division Semifinals (STL)
WIN	1989–90	80	37	32	11	85	3rd in Smythe	3	4	.429	Lost in Division Semifinals (EDM)
WIN	1990–91	80	26	43	11	63	5th in Smythe	—	—	—	Missed playoffs
Total		240	93	116	31			4	8	.333	2 playoff appearances

== Awards and achievements ==
- Stanley Cup champion – 1971, 1973
- Played in NHL All-Star Game – 1975
- Jack Adams Award winner – 1990

Sporting positions
Preceded by Bob Pulford	Head coach of the Chicago Blackhawks; 1987–88	Succeeded by Mike Keenan
Preceded by Rick Bowness	Head coach of the Winnipeg Jets; 1989–1991	Succeeded by John Paddock
Awards and achievements
Preceded by Pat Burns	Winner of the Jack Adams Award; 1990	Succeeded by Brian Sutter
