= List of Johnstown Chiefs head coaches =

The Johnstown Chiefs were an American professional ice hockey team based in Johnstown, Pennsylvania. They played in the East Coast Hockey League (eventually shortened to ECHL). The franchise was originally established in January 1988 as a member of the All-American Hockey League. In June 1988, the franchise would become one of the five new franchises of the ECHL. Since their foundation in 1988, the Chiefs have played their home games at the Cambria County War Memorial Arena. The Chiefs were last owned by former New York Rangers general manager Neil Smith. Although the Chiefs franchise was moved to Greenville, the name, records, logos and all names identifying the Johnstown history have been retained by a non-profit organization.

== Coaching History ==
There have been 10 head coaches for the Chiefs franchise. The franchise's first head coach was Joe Selenski, who held the position while the team was a member of the AAHL. Former NHL player Steve Carlson - also famous for his role in the movie Slap Shot (movie) as one of the Hanson brothers - was the only coach who took the Chiefs to the then-Riley Cup Finals, losing four games to three to the Carolina Thunderbirds. Ed Johnstone coached the Chiefs to three consecutive thirty-win seasons, but only advanced past the first round of the playoffs once. Former NHL enforcer Nick Fotiu coached the Chiefs from 1995 to 1997, managing 47 wins in his first two seasons. He started the 1997-98 ECHL season with six wins in his first thirty games, and eventually was replaced by assistant coach Scott Allen. Allen experienced the longest and most successful runs of all the previous Chiefs coaches, having coached the team for 324 regular season games, and taking the team to the second round of the playoffs three of his four full seasons as head coach. Former Chiefs goaltender Toby O'Brien would assume the role of coach in 2003. Despite missing the postseason two of his three years, O'Brien would also lead the Chiefs to the best record in their 22-year history, going 45–20–7. During the final five years, the Chiefs would go through three more coaches (Frank Anzalone, Ian Herbers, and Jeff Flanagan) before owner Neil Smith stepped down to the bench for the final thirty seven games in Chiefs history.

== Key ==
#	Number of coaches
Term	Years spent as coach
Games	Games coached
W	Wins
L	Losses
T	Ties
OTL	Overtime/shootout losses
Win%	Winning percentage
PG	Playoff games coached
PW	Playoff wins
PL	Playoff losses
PWin%	Playoff winning percentage
	Coached in the ECHL All-Star game

== Coaches ==
#	Name^{[b]}	Term^{[c]}	Games	W	L	T	OTL	Win%	PG	PW	PL	PWin%	Achievements	Ref
1	Joe Selenski	1987–1988	26	13	13	0	—	.500	—	—	—	—	coached Chiefs during only season in AAHL	
2	Steve Carlson	1988–1992	149	123	106	20	—	.535	14	14	13	.519		
3	Ed Johnstone	1992–1995	200	102	82	16	—	.550	14	3	5	.375		
4	Nick Fotiu	1995–1997	170	51	97	22	—	.364	—	—	—	—	Fired 12-26-97	
5	Scott Allen	1997–2002	324	144	150	33	—	.495	12	7	12	.368		
6	Toby O'Brien	2002–2005	216	95	89	32	—	.514	1	0	1	.000		
7	Frank Anzalone	2005-2007	144	63	59	22	—	.514	7	2	5	.285		
8	Ian Herbers	2007–2009	144	73	60	11	—	.545	6	2	4	.333		
9	Jeff Flanagan	2009-2010	35	9	19	7	—	.357	—	—	—	—		
10	Neil Smith	2009-2010	37	9	24	0	—	.297	—	—	—	—		
