= Johnstown Chiefs =

Defunct minor league ice hockey team

- City: Johnstown, Pennsylvania
- League: ECHL
- Operated: 1987–2010
- Home arena: Cambria County War Memorial Arena
- Colors: Black, gold, white

Franchise history
- 1987–2010: Johnstown Chiefs
- 2010–2015: Greenville Road Warriors
- 2015–present: Greenville Swamp Rabbits

Championships
- Regular season titles: None
- Division titles: None
- Conference titles: None
- Kelly Cups: None

The Johnstown Chiefs were a minor league ice hockey team located in Johnstown, Pennsylvania, that played in the ECHL. The team was founded in 1987 in the All-American Hockey League, and moved to the East Coast Hockey League (now ECHL) when the league was formed. The Chiefs lasted for 22 years in Johnstown, and were the last of the founding ECHL teams playing under its original name and in its original city. The Chiefs relocated to Greenville, South Carolina, following the completion of the 2010 season.

== Franchise history ==
The owners originally wanted to name the team the Jets in honor of a team that had played in Johnstown from 1950 to 1977, mostly in the Eastern Hockey League. However, the old Jets' former owners still held the trademark for the name and refused to allow the new team to use it. A contest was held by the owners, allowing the people of Johnstown to vote for the new team name. The cult hockey movie Slap Shot had been filmed in Johnstown, and featured a minor league team called the Charlestown Chiefs. The fans readily jumped on the tie-in, and the Johnstown Chiefs were born.

The Chiefs played their home games in the historic 3,745 seat Cambria County War Memorial Arena in Johnstown, where most of the hockey scenes in the movie Slap Shot were filmed. Despite popular belief, the Chiefs uniforms colors (black, gold, and white) were not chosen because of the local fans' connection to the Steelers, Pirates, and Penguins. Shortly after the emergency lease had been approved by the Cambria County War Memorial, head coach Joe Selenski traveled to Canada to find the team uniforms and called War Memorial Marketing Director Dennis Grenell at 3:00 AM to tell him that the only uniforms he could find were black and gold (similar to the Boston Bruins' uniforms of the 1970s), but he did not have enough money to buy them. Grennell agreed to pay for the uniforms using his own credit card. Coincidentally, the Chiefs' first minor league affiliation would be with the Boston Bruins.

Steve Carlson became the Chiefs' coach for the 1989–90 season following a two-year stint as an assistant coach with the Baltimore Skipjacks. It marked a return to Johnstown for Carlson, who had appeared in the movie Slap Shot as one of the three Hanson Brothers.

The Chiefs along with the Wheeling Thunderbirds (now known as the Wheeling Nailers) played the role of the Pittsburgh Penguins in the 1995 film Sudden Death starring Jean-Claude Van Damme. The premise was the Penguins playing the Chicago Blackhawks for the Stanley Cup when terrorists attempt to hold the Vice President hostage in the arena.

On August 17, 2007, the Chiefs announced that they entered into an affiliation agreement with the NHL's Colorado Avalanche. During the 2007–08 season, the Chiefs served as the Avalanche's secondary minor league affiliate. On September 18, 2007, the Chiefs announced they had also entered an affiliation agreement with the Boston Bruins for the 2007–08 season.

Prior to the 2008–09 season the Chiefs re-signed their affiliation with the Avalanche and entered into an affiliation agreement with the Columbus Blue Jackets, replacing the Bruins, on August 22, 2008.

For the 2009–10 season, the Chiefs were the secondary minor league affiliate to the Minnesota Wild. Jeff Flanagan took up the role of head coach to start the year. After leading the team to an ECHL cellar dwelling 9–19–7 record, Flanagan was fired, replaced for the remainder of the season by majority owner Neil Smith on January 10, 2010.

In February 2010, the Tribune-Democrat reported that television reports from Greenville, South Carolina, stated that the Chiefs would be relocated to Greenville following the season and compete at the BI-LO Center. Greenville had previously been home to the Greenville Grrrowl, who played in the ECHL from 1998 to 2006 when the ECHL revoked Greenville's franchise rights. On February 17, 2010, the league announced that the Chiefs would be relocating to Greenville after the league's Board of Governors voted unanimously in favor of the move. News of the relocation also made the press in New York City, including the New York Times, due to Smith being the former president and governor of the New York Rangers and former general manager of the New York Islanders. The team, renamed the Greenville Road Warriors, then became affiliated with the Rangers.

The team played their final game as the Johnstown Chiefs on Saturday April 3, 2010. The result was a 5–3 loss to the Elmira Jackals. According to a pre-game address by minority owner Ned Nakles to the fans in attendance, the Chiefs name, logo, team records and history would not follow the franchise to Greenville, but would remain in Johnstown under ownership by a non-profit group to possibly be used again should a new team enter the ECHL in the city.

The Wheeling Nailers, the ECHL affiliate of the Pittsburgh Penguins, announced prior to the Chiefs season finale that they would play 10 of their 36 regular season home games and one preseason game at the Cambria County War Memorial Arena during the 2010–11 ECHL season.

=== Active players ===
At the conclusion of the 2025–26 season, sixteen seasons after their final season in Johnstown, there were five former Chiefs players still active in professional and semi-professional hockey.

Player		Year(s) with Chiefs	2025-26 team	League		Stats	Notes
Sebastian Dahm	(Denmark)	2008-09	EC KAC	ICEHL	(Denmark)	35 GP, 21-13-0, 2.32 GAA, .916, 5 SO	signed with team through 2026-27
Ian MacLean	(Canada)	2006-07	Sydney Ice Dogs	AIHL	(Australia)	6 GP, 0G-2A-2P
Petr Pohl	(Czech Republic)	2008-09	ERV Schweinfurt	Regionalliga	(Germany)	22 GP, 26G-28A-54P
Bill Ruggiero	(United States)	2001-02	Michigan Shadow	MIHL	(Australia)	8 GP, 1-0-0, 8.20 GAA, .840
Ryan Tocher	(Canada)	1999-2001	St. Catharines Saints	Allan Cup	(Canada)	13 GP, 0G-6A-6P

== Season results ==
Records as of 2009–10 season.

Season	League	Division	GP	W	L	T	OTL	SOL	Pts	PCT	GF	GA	PIM	Coach(es)	Playoffs
1987–88	AAHL		26	13	13	0	—	—	26	.500	157	115		Joe Selenski	
1988–89	ECHL		60	32	22	—	6	—	70	.583	295	251		Steve Carlson	Lost in Finals
1989–90	ECHL		60	23	31	—	6	—	52	.433	233	291	2047	Steve Carlson	Did not qualify
1990–91	ECHL	East	64	32	29	—	3	—	67	.523	324	287	1646	Steve Carlson	Lost in round 2
1991–92	ECHL	West	64	36	23	—	5	—	77	.601	294	248	1750	Steve Carlson	Lost in round 2
1992–93	ECHL	East	64	34	23	—	7	—	75	.585	281	264	1647	Ed Johnstone	Lost in round 2
1993–94	ECHL	North	68	37	27	—	4	—	78	.573	323	308	1978	Ed Johnstone	Lost in round 1
1994–95	ECHL	North	68	31	32	—	5	—	67	.492	256	297	1656	Ed Johnstone	Lost in round 1
1995–96	ECHL	North	70	21	38	—	11	—	53	.378	249	322	2481	Nick Fotiu	Did not qualify
1996–97	ECHL	North	70	24	39	7	—	—	55	.392	253	354	2287	Nick Fotiu	Did not qualify
1997–98	ECHL	Northeast	70	23	41	6	—	—	52	.371	219	297	2118	Nick Fotiu; Scott Allen	Did not qualify
1998–99	ECHL	Northeast	70	27	34	9	—	—	63	.450	218	265	1734	Scott Allen	Did not qualify
1999–00	ECHL	Northwest	70	33	28	—	9	—	75	.535	235	234	1959	Scott Allen	Lost in round 3
2000–01	ECHL	Northwest	72	28	36	8	—	—	64	.444	207	238	1865	Scott Allen	Lost in round 2
2001–02	ECHL	Northwest	72	39	31	2	—	—	80	.555	220	232	1688	Scott Allen	Lost in round 3
2002–03	ECHL	Northwest	72	28	33	11	—	—	67	.465	214	243	1700	Toby O'Brien	Did not qualify
2003–04	ECHL	Northern	72	45	20	7	—	—	97	.673	223	195	1491	Toby O'Brien	Lost in Qualifier
2004–05	ECHL	North	72	22	36	14	—	—	58	.402	191	258	1421	Toby O'Brien	Did not qualify
2005–06	ECHL	North	72	30	26	16	—	—	76	.527	223	243	1119	Frank Anzalone	Lost in round 2
2006–07	ECHL	North	72	33	33	—	3	3	72	.500	216	232	1179	Frank Anzalone	Lost in round 1
2007–08	ECHL	North	72	36	30	—	3	3	78	.541	235	234	1568	Ian Herbers	Lost in round 2
2008–09	ECHL	North	72	37	30	—	5	0	79	.549	228	232	1472	Ian Herbers	Did not qualify
2009–10	ECHL	East	72	18	43	—	7	4	47	.326	215	307	1385	Jeff Flanagan; Neil Smith	Did not qualify

Note: GP = Games played, W = Wins, L = Losses, T = Ties, OTL = Overtime losses, SOL = Shootout losses, Pts = Points, PCT = Winning percentage, GF = Goals for, GA = Goals against, PIM = Penalties in minutes

== Playoffs ==
- 1988–89: Defeated Knoxville 4–0 in semifinals; lost to Carolina 4–3 in finals.
- 1989–90: Did not qualify.
- 1990–91: Defeated Erie 3–2 in quarterfinals; lost to Hampton Roads 4–1 in semifinals.
- 1991–92: Defeated Erie 3–1 in first round; lost to Cincinnati 2–0 in quarterfinals.
- 1992–93: Defeated Richmond 1–0 in first round; lost to Wheeling 3–1 in quarterfinals.
- 1993–94: Lost to Columbus 2–1 in first round.
- 1994–95: Lost to South Carolina 3–1 in first round.
- 1995–96: Did not qualify.
- 1996–97: Did not qualify.
- 1997–98: Did not qualify.
- 1998–99: Did not qualify.
- 1999–00: Defeated Roanoke 3–1 in first round; lost to Peoria 3–0 in quarterfinals.
- 2000–01: Lost to Trenton 3–1 in first round.
- 2001–02: Defeated Peoria 3–2 in first round; lost to Dayton 3–0 in quarterfinals.
- 2002–03: Did not qualify.
- 2003–04: Lost to Reading 1–0 in qualifying round.
- 2004–05: Did not qualify.
- 2005–06: Defeated Trenton 2–0 in qualifying round; lost to Toledo 3–0 in first round.
- 2006–07: Lost to Trenton 2–0 in qualifying round.
- 2007–08: Defeated Dayton 2–0 in qualifying round; lost to Cincinnati 4–0 in first round.
- 2008–09: Did not qualify.
- 2009–10: Did not qualify.

== Chiefs alumni who have played in the NHL ==
#		Player	Position	Year(s) with Chiefs	NHL team	Year(s) in NHL
31	(Canada)	Scott Bailey	G	1992–93	Boston Bruins	1995–97
55	(Canada)	Garrett Burnett	LW	1997–98	Mighty Ducks of Anaheim	2003–04
—	(Canada)	Shawn Byram	LW	1989–90	Chicago Blackhawks; New York Islanders	1990–91; 1991–92
—	(United States)	John Craighead	RW	1992–93	Toronto Maple Leafs	1996–97
—	(The Bahamas)	Andre Deveaux	C	2005–07	Toronto Maple Leafs; New York Rangers	2008–09; 2011–12
—	(Canada)	Benoit Dusablon	C	2000–01	New York Rangers	2003–04
—	(United States)	Brian Eklund	G	2005–06	New York Rangers	2005–06
23	(United States)	Matt Glennon	LW	1991–92	Boston Bruins	1991–92
30	(United States)	Scott Gordon	G	1988–89	Quebec Nordiques; New York Islanders (head coach); Philadelphia Flyers (head coach)	1989–91; 2008–10; 2018–19
30	(United States)	David Gove	C	2001–02	Carolina Hurricanes	2005–07
1	(Latvia)	Arturs Irbe	G	2003–2004	San Jose Sharks; Dallas Stars; Vancouver Canucks; Carolina Hurricanes	1991–96; 1996–97; 1997–98; 1998-2004
31	(Canada)	Neil Little	G	1994–95	Philadelphia Flyers	2001–02; 2003–04
—	(United States)	Raymond Macias	D	2007–09	Colorado Avalanche	2008–09
—	(United States)	Marquis Mathieu	D	1995–96	Boston Bruins	1998–2001
—	(Canada)	Brett McLean	C	1999–2000	Chicago Blackhawks; Colorado Avalanche; Florida Panthers	2002–04; 2005–07; 2007–09
17	(Canada)	Mitch Molloy	LW	1989–90	Buffalo Sabres	1989–90
26	(United States)	Chris Mueller	C	2008–09	Nashville Predators; Dallas Stars; New York Rangers	2010–13; 2013–14; 2014–15
—	(Canada)	Doug O'Brien	D	2004–05	Tampa Bay Lightning	2005–06
—	(Canada)	Wes O'Neill	D	2007–09	Colorado Avalanche	2008–10
17	(Canada)	Greg Parks	RW	1989–90	New York Islanders	1990–93
—	(Kazakhstan)	Dimitri Patzold	G	2003–04	San Jose Sharks	2007–08
44	(Canada)	Jay Rosehill	D	2005–07	Toronto Maple Leafs; Philadelphia Flyers	2009–12; 2012–14
30	(Canada)	Dany Sabourin	G	2000–02	Calgary Flames; Pittsburgh Penguins; Vancouver Canucks	2003–04; 2005–06, 2007–09; 2006–07
8	(Canada)	Ryan Savoia	C	1996–98	Pittsburgh Penguins	1998–99
15	(Canada)	Jody Shelley	LW	1998–2000	Columbus Blue Jackets; San Jose Sharks; New York Rangers; Philadelphia Flyers	2000–08; 2008–10; 2010; 2010–13
—	(Canada)	Jason Simon	LW	1990–91	New York Islanders; Phoenix Coyotes	1993–94; 1996–97
1	(Latvia)	Peter Skudra	G	1995–97	Pittsburgh Penguins; Buffalo Sabres; Boston Bruins; Vancouver Canucks	1997–2000; 2000–01; 2000–01; 2001–03
—	(Czech Republic)	Radek Smolenak	LW	2006–07	Tampa Bay Lightning; Chicago Blackhawks	2008–09; 2009–10
—	(Canada)	Grant Stevenson	RW	2004–05	San Jose Sharks	2005–06
10	(United States)	Billy Tibbetts	RW	1995–96	Pittsburgh Penguins; Philadelphia Flyers; New York Rangers	2000–02; 2001–02; 2002–03
—	(Canada)	John Tripp	RW	1998–2000	New York Rangers; Los Angeles Kings	2002–03; 2003–04
4	(Canada)	Derrick Walser	D	1998–2000	Columbus Blue Jackets	2001–04, 2006–07

== Affiliations ==
The Chiefs had several NHL and AHL affiliations while in the ECHL. They were first affiliated with the Boston Bruins in 1991 and held affiliations with eight NHL teams.

Season	NHL Affiliate (Primary)	NHL Affiliate (Secondary)	AHL Affiliate (Primary)	AHL Affiliate (Secondary)
1987-88	No affiliations
1988-89	No affiliations
1989-90	No affiliations
1990-91	No affiliations
1991-92	Boston Bruins		Maine Mariners
1992-93	Boston Bruins		No affiliations
1993-94	No affiliations		Hershey Bears
1994-95	No affiliations		Hershey Bears
1995-96	No affiliations
1996-97	Pittsburgh Penguins		No affiliations
1997-98	Pittsburgh Penguins	Philadelphia Flyers	Philadelphia Phantoms
1998-99	Calgary Flames		Saint John Flames
1999-2000	Calgary Flames		Saint John Flames
2000-01	Calgary Flames	Tampa Bay Lightning	Saint John Flames
2001-02	Calgary Flames		Saint John Flames
2002-03	Calgary Flames		Saint John Flames
2003-04	San Jose Sharks		Cleveland Barons
2004-05	San Jose Sharks	Tampa Bay Lightning	Cleveland Barons	Springfield Falcons
2005-06	Tampa Bay Lightning		Springfield Falcons
2006-07	Tampa Bay Lightning		Springfield Falcons
2007-08	Colorado Avalanche	Boston Bruins	Cleveland Monsters	Providence Bruins
2008-09	Colorado Avalanche	Columbus Blue Jackets	Cleveland Monsters	Syracuse Crunch
2009-10	Minnesota Wild		Houston Aeros

== Retired numbers ==
The Chiefs retired four numbers: the numbers of Don Hall, Dick Roberge, Galen Head and Reg Kent, all of whom had played for the Johnstown Jets.

- 7 – Reg Kent, number retired on February 15, 2009, during a pregame ceremony prior to a game against the Wheeling Nailers.
- 8 – Galen Head, number retired by the Chiefs on October 18, 2003, during a pregame ceremony prior to a game against the Long Beach Ice Dogs
- 9 – Don Hall, Hall's #9 was originally retired by the Johnstown Jets on April 6, 1962. A separate ceremony involving a banner raising was held by the Johnstown Chiefs during the Chiefs' 1989–90 season.
- 11 – Dick Roberge, Roberge's #11 was originally retired by the Johnstown Jets without a ceremony after the completion of the 1971–72 season. A separate ceremony involving a banner raising was held by the Johnstown Chiefs during the Chiefs' 1989–90 season.

== League awards ==
=== All-Star Game ===
Twenty-two players participated in the ECHL All-Star game as a member of the Johnstown Chiefs. Of the twenty-two players who represented the Chiefs, only one player (Don Parsons) won the All-Star Game MVP. Only one player (Rob Leask) participated in the ECHL All-Star Game multiple times while representing the Chiefs.

Two players that participated in the All-Star Game as a representative of the Chiefs (David Gove and Derrick Walser) eventually went on to play in the National Hockey League.

Season	Player	Team	Position	Stats	Source
1992-93	Bruce Coles	East All-Stars	LW	1 G
1993-94	Rob Leask	East All-Stars	D	0 points
1994-95	Rob Leask	East All-Stars	D	2 A
1995-96	Don Parsons	Northern Conference	W	2 G, 1 A; 1996 ECHL All-Star Game MVP
1996-97	Alexsandr Chunchukov	ECHL All-Stars	RW	0 points
1997-98	Harold Hersh	USA/World All-Stars	C	0 points
1998-99	Jakub Ficenic	Northern Conference	D	1 A
1998-99	Casey Kesselring	Northern Conference	C	0 points
1999-00	Joel Irving	Northern Conference	W	1 G
1999-00	Derrick Walser	Northern Conference	D	1 G, 1 A
2000-01	Eric Schneider	Northern Conference	F	2 A
2000-01	Mike Vellinga	Northern Conference	D	0 points
2001-02	David Gove	Northern Conference	C	0 points
2002-03	Pierre-Luc Courchesne	Northern Conference	D	1 A, +1, 3 SOG, 2 PIM
2003-04	Cory Campbell	Eastern Conference	G	Saved 8 of 11 shots in the second period (ND)
2003-04	Jason Notermann	Eastern Conference	F	1 G, 4 SOG, +1
2004-05	Jean DesRochers	National Conference	C	1 G, 3 SOG, +1
2005-06	Jonathan Boutin	National Conference	G	Saved 8 of 10 shots in the first period (ND)
2006-07	Maxime Boisclair	American Conference	RW	2 A
2007-08	Ryan Garlock	American Conference	C	1 A
2008-09	Ryan Del Monte	American Conference	RW	0 points, 3 shots on goal
2008-09	Kris Mayotte	American Conference	G	Saved 10 of 13 shots in the first period (ND)
2009-10	Connor Shields	American Conference	F	2 G

Additionally, several Chiefs' players were named to the ECHL All-Star Game but did not participate for various reasons.

Season	Player	Team	Position	Reason	Source
2003-04	Arturs Irbe	Eastern Conference	G	Was voted as a starter, but missed the game due to a wrist injury.
2007-08	Jon Landry	American Conference	D	Was voted as a starter, but was recalled to Syracuse (AHL) during the All-Star break.

Members of the Chiefs' coaching staff represented the team three times. Frank Anzalone represented the team twice, while Ian Herbers also represented the team.

Season	Coach	Team	Role	Result	Source
2006-07	Frank Anzalone	American Conference	Head Coach	6-3 (W)
2007-08	Frank Anzalone	American Conference	Head Coach	7-10 (L)
2008-09	Ian Herbers	American Conference	Head Coach	11-5 (W)

=== ECHL All-Star Team ===
The following players were named to the ECHL All-Star team, announced at the end of the season.

- 1988–89, Scott Gordon, First Team, Goaltender
- 1988–89, Rob Hyrtsak, First Team, Center
- 1991–92, Mark Green, First Team, Left Wing

=== Additional Awards ===
The following players received individual awards from the ECHL, announced at the end of the season.

- 1988–89, Scott Gordon, Top Goaltender
- 1988–89, Tom Sasso, ECHL Rookie of the Year
