= Thomas Eriksson =

Thomas Eriksson may refer to:

- Thomas Eriksson (high jumper) (born 1963), Swedish athlete
- Thomas Eriksson (ice hockey) (born 1959), Swedish ice hockey player
- Thomas Eriksson (skier) (born 1959), Swedish skier

== See also ==
- Tom Erikson (born 1964), wrestler and mixed martial artist
- Tomaz Eriksson (born 1967), Swedish ice hockey player
