= Jim Sprott =

Jim Sprott may refer to:

- Jim Sprott (scientist), scientist involved in forensic work regarding the murder of Harvey and Jeannette Crewe
- Jim Sprott (ice hockey) (born 1969), Canadian ice hockey defenceman
