= Scott Allen (ice hockey) =

- Born: April 6, 1966 (age 60) New Bedford, Massachusetts, U.S.
- Height: 5 ft 10 in (178 cm)
- Weight: 180 lb (82 kg; 12 st 12 lb)
- Position: Center
- Shot: Left
- Played for: Troy Sabres; Carolina Thunderbirds; Winston-Salem Thunderbirds; Erie Panthers; Greensboro Monarchs; Cincinnati Cyclones; Flint Bulldogs; Utica Bulldogs; Fort Worth Fire; Johnstown Chiefs
- NHL draft: Undrafted
- Playing career: 1986–1997

Scott Allen (born April 6, 1966, in New Bedford, Massachusetts) is a retired professional ice hockey center and a former assistant coach of the New York Islanders and Arizona Coyotes of the National Hockey League. He is currently an assistant coach for the Washington Capitals of the National Hockey League (NHL).

== Playing career ==
Allen started his career with the Troy Sabres of the All-American Hockey League in 1986. He was then traded to the Carolina Thunderbirds during the 1986–87 season. Allen stayed with the team for four seasons as they made their move from the AAHL to the ECHL and changed their name from the Carolina Thunderbirds to the Winston-Salem Thunderbirds. During the 1988–89 ECHL season, Allen played slightly under fourteen minutes as a goaltender for the Carolina Thunderbirds, giving up 3 goals on 10 shots. GAA of 13.26 with a save percentage of .700.

Allen was traded to the Erie Panthers at the beginning of the 1989–90 season and finished the season as a member of the Greensboro Monarchs. Allen won consecutive Riley Cups as a member of the Thunderbirds in 1989 and as a member of the Monarchs in 1990. Allen would play six games for the Cincinnati Cyclones during the 1990–91 season before leaving for the Colonial Hockey League in 1991–92. Allen would retire from hockey in 1996.

== Coaching career ==
Allen joined the Johnstown Chiefs as an assistant to head coach Nick Fotiu prior to the 1996–97 ECHL season. The team went 24–39–0–7 in Allen's first year as an assistant coach. Fotiu and Allen returned to the Chiefs' bench for the 1997–98 season. The Chiefs started their season 4–20–6 (.233), and Fotiu was fired from the team after 30 games. Allen assumed the duties as head coach for the remainder of the season, where the team showed improvement by going 17–21–2 (.450) over the last 40 games. The Chiefs went 27–34–0–9 in 1998–99 matching the previous season's win percentage of .450. The 1999–00 season was the start of a three-year run where the Chiefs advanced deep into the playoffs. The Chiefs advanced to the conference semifinals in both 2000 and 2002, and made the ECHL conference quarterfinals in 2001. Allen then left the ECHL to take an assistant coach's position with the San Antonio Rampage in the American Hockey League (AHL). Allen then accepted assistant coach positions in Omaha, Lowell, and Quad City after leaving the Rampage.

On July 20, 2009, Allen was named as an assistant coach to head coach Scott Gordon of the New York Islanders. Gordon, like Allen, had played in the ECHL as a member of the Johnstown Chiefs. On April 16, 2012, Allen was let go from his assistant coaching position by the New York Islanders.

In the 2013–14 season, he was an assistant coach for the AHL's Chicago Wolves. He returned as an assistant coach to the AHL's San Antonio Rampage for the 2014–15 season. Following the Florida Panthers affiliate switch to the Portland Pirates, Allen began the season in an assistant role for 2015–16. On January 1, 2016, Allen was announced as the Pirates' head coach mid-season, as Tom Rowe accepted a promotion within the Panthers' organization. On June 7, 2016, Allen was named assistant coach of the Florida Panthers in the NHL.

On July 26, 2017, Allen was named an assistant coach with the Arizona Coyotes in the NHL. After leading the Coyotes to the best penalty killing percentage (tie) and the 5th lowest goals against average in the entire NHL (tie), Allen was fired by the Coyotes after the 2018–19 season.

He was hired as an assistant coach for the Hershey Bears of the AHL in August 2019. He was promoted to head coach of the Bears prior to the 2021–22 season. On July 25, 2022, he was named an assistant coach for the Washington Capitals.

== Awards ==
- 1988–89, Riley Cup winner (Carolina Thunderbirds)
- 1989–90, Riley Cup winner (Greensboro Monarchs)

== Personal ==
Allen has a wife, Traci, and two daughters, Mackenzie and Camryn.

Preceded by Nick Fotiu	Head coaches of the Johnstown Chiefs; 1997–2002	Succeeded by Toby O'Brien
Preceded by Spencer Carbery	Head coach of the Hershey Bears; 2022	Succeeded by Todd Nelson
