= Todd Nelson (ice hockey) =

Canadian ice hockey player (born 1969)

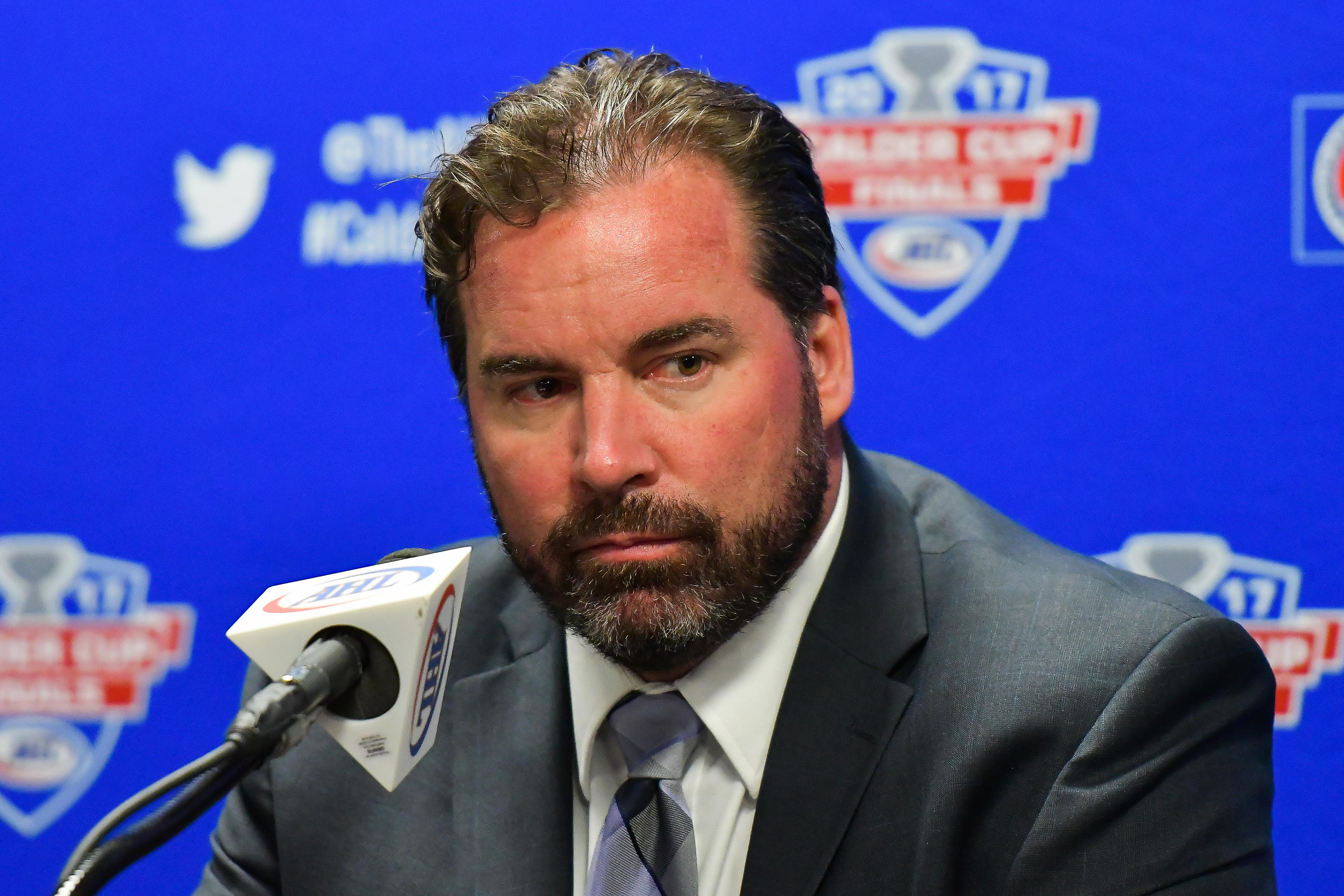
- Nelson in 2017
- Born: May 15, 1969 (age 57) Prince Albert, Saskatchewan, Canada
- Height: 6 ft 0 in (183 cm)
- Weight: 201 lb (91 kg; 14 st 5 lb)
- Position: Defence
- Shot: Left
- Played for: Pittsburgh Penguins; Washington Capitals; Berlin Capitals; HIFK
- Current NHL coach: Pittsburgh Penguins
- Coached for: Dallas Stars; Edmonton Oilers
- NHL draft: 79th overall, 1989; Pittsburgh Penguins
- Playing career: 1990–2002
- Coaching career: 2003–present

Todd Nelson (born May 15, 1969) is a Canadian ice hockey coach and former professional player. He is currently serving as an assistant coach of the Pittsburgh Penguins of the National Hockey League (NHL). He played 3 games in the National Hockey League with the Pittsburgh Penguins and Washington Capitals between 1991 and 1994. The rest of his playing career, which lasted from 1990 to 2002, was mainly spent in the minor leagues.

== Playing career ==
Originally drafted by the Pittsburgh Penguins in the 1989 NHL entry draft, Nelson played primarily in the minors and played just one game for the Penguins. Signed as a free agent by the Washington Capitals, he helped guide the Capitals' minor league affiliate Portland Pirates to the Calder Cup in 1994. He was inducted into the Pirates Hall of Fame in 2007. Nelson played in just two games for the Washington Capitals, and played in the minors until his retirement in 2002.

== Coaching career ==
Following his professional hockey career, Nelson moved into coaching. He was first the assistant coach/player coach for the Muskegon Fury of the UHL for the 2001–02 season. He was then an assistant coach for the Grand Rapids Griffins of the AHL for the 2002–03 season before returning as head coach of the Muskegon Fury from 2003 to 2006. The Fury won the Colonial Cup his first two years as their coach. He moved on to be the assistant coach for the Chicago Wolves of the AHL from 2006 to 2008, who won the Calder Cup in his final season as an assistant.

On July 25, 2008, he accepted an assistant coaching position with the Atlanta Thrashers of the NHL.

On July 15, 2010, he was introduced as the first head coach of the AHL's Oklahoma City Barons, affiliate of the NHL's Edmonton Oilers.

After the firing of Dallas Eakins on December 15, 2014, Nelson was promoted to head coach of the Oilers on an interim basis for the remainder of the 2014–15 NHL season. He was replaced as head coach by Todd McLellan on May 19, 2015.

On June 16, 2015, Nelson was named the head coach of the Grand Rapids Griffins of the American Hockey League (AHL). Nelson became the third person ever to win the Calder Cup as a player (1994), assistant coach (2008), and head coach (2017), joining Bob Woods and Mike Stothers.

On May 31, 2018, Nelson left the Griffins to become an assistant coach with the Dallas Stars in the NHL until his contract wasn't renewed on May 20, 2022.

On August 11, 2022, Nelson was named the head coach of the Hershey Bears. He is the 28th head coach in team history.

On June 21st, 2023, Nelson coached the Hershey Bears to their 12th Calder Cup Championship in his first season as the head coach, beating the Coachella Valley Firebirds in overtime in game seven. On June 24, 2024, Nelson coached the Bears to their 13th Calder Cup Championship in his second season as the head coach, beating Coachella Valley in overtime again. This series was decided in game six.

On June 20, 2025, Nelson was promoted to assistant coach for the Pittsburgh Penguins.

== Personal life ==
Nelson is the older brother of Jeff Nelson and Kerri Nelson-Brunen, and is the father of Colton Nelson, former Division III hockey player at the University of Wisconsin-Superior.

== Career statistics ==
=== Regular season and playoffs ===
			Regular season					Playoffs
Season	Team	League	GP	G	A	Pts	PIM	GP	G	A	Pts	PIM
1985–86	Prince Albert Raiders	WHL	4	0	0	0	0	—	—	—	—	—
1986–87	Prince Albert Raiders	WHL	35	1	6	7	10	4	0	0	0	0
1987–88	Prince Albert Raiders	WHL	72	3	21	24	59	10	3	2	5	4
1988–89	Prince Albert Raiders	WHL	72	14	45	59	72	4	1	3	4	4
1989–90	Prince Albert Raiders	WHL	69	13	42	55	88	14	3	12	15	12
1990–91	Muskegon Lumberjacks	IHL	4	20	24	32	3	0	0	0	4
1991–92	Pittsburgh Penguins	NHL	1	0	0	0	0	—	—	—	—	—
1991–92	Muskegon Lumberjacks	IHL	80	6	35	41	46	14	1	11	12	4
1992–93	Cleveland Lumberjacks	IHL	76	7	35	42	115	4	0	2	2	4
1993–94	Washington Capitals	NHL	2	1	0	1	2	4	0	0	0	0
1993–94	Portland Pirates	AHL	80	11	34	45	69	11	0	6	6	6
1994–95	Portland Pirates	AHL	75	10	35	45	76	7	0	4	4	6
1995–96	Hershey Bears	AHL	70	10	40	50	38	5	1	2	3	8
1996–97	Grand Rapids Griffins	IHL	81	3	18	21	32	5	1	0	1	0
1997–98	Grand Rapids Griffins	IHL	75	6	21	27	36	3	0	0	0	2
1998–99	Berlin Capitals	DEL	44	5	10	15	26	—	—	—	—	—
1999–00	HIFK Helsinki	FIN	4	1	1	2	2	—	—	—	—	—
1999–00	Grand Rapids Griffins	IHL	73	2	15	17	47	17	0	2	2	10
2000–01	Rochester Americans	AHL	74	6	20	26	32	4	0	2	2	2
2001–02	Grand Rapids Griffins	AHL	7	0	2	2	8	—	—	—	—	—
2001–02	Muskegon Fury	UHL	66	8	25	33	38	17	2	6	8	2
IHL totals			464	28	144	172	308	46	2	15	17	22
NHL totals			3	1	0	1	2	4	0	0	0	0

== Coaching record ==
† – replaced midseason
‡ – midseason replacement

=== NHL ===
Team	Year	Regular season						Postseason			
Team	Year	Games	Won	Lost	OTL	Points	Finish	Won	Lost	Win %	Result
Edmonton Oilers	2014–15‡	51	17	25	9	.422	6th in Pacific	—	—	—	Missed playoffs
NHL totals		51	17	25	9	.422	—	—	—	—	

=== Minor leagues ===
Team	Year	Regular season						Postseason			
Team	Year	Games	Won	Lost	OTL	Points	Finish	Games	Won	Lost	Result
Muskegon Fury	2003–04	76	47	20	9	103	3rd in Western	11	11	0	Won Colonial Cup
Muskegon Fury	2004–05	80	51	20	9	111	1st in Central	17	12	5	Won Colonial Cup
Muskegon Fury	2005–06	76	51	18	7	109	2nd in Central	12	6	6	Lost in second round
Oklahoma City Barons	2010–11	80	40	29	11	91	5th in West	6	2	4	Lost in Division Semifinals
Oklahoma City Barons	2011–12	76	45	22	9	99	1st in West	14	8	6	Lost in Conference Finals
Oklahoma City Barons	2012–13	76	40	25	11	91	3rd in South	17	10	7	Lost in Conference Finals
Oklahoma City Barons	2013–14	76	36	29	11	83	3rd in West	3	0	3	Lost in Conference Quarterfinals
Grand Rapids Griffins	2015–16	76	44	30	2	90	4th in Central	9	5	4	Lost in Division Finals
Grand Rapids Griffins	2016–17	76	47	23	1	100	2nd in Central	19	15	4	Won Calder Cup
Grand Rapids Griffins	2017–18	76	42	25	9	93	2nd in Central	5	2	3	Lost in Division Semifinals
Hershey Bears	2022–23	72	44	19	9	97	2nd in Atlantic	20	14	6	Won Calder Cup
Hershey Bears	2023–24	72	53	14	5	111	1st in Atlantic	20	14	6	Won Calder Cup
AHL totals		705	406	222	77			113	70	43	
UHL totals		232	149	58	23			40	29	11	

== Awards ==
- WHL East Second All-Star Team (1989, 1990)

Preceded by Dallas Eakins	Interim Head Coach of the Edmonton Oilers; 2014–15	Succeeded by Todd McLellan
Preceded by Scott Allen	Head coach of the Hershey Bears; 2022–2025	Succeeded by Derek King
