= Ian Herbers =

Canadian ice hockey player (born 1967)

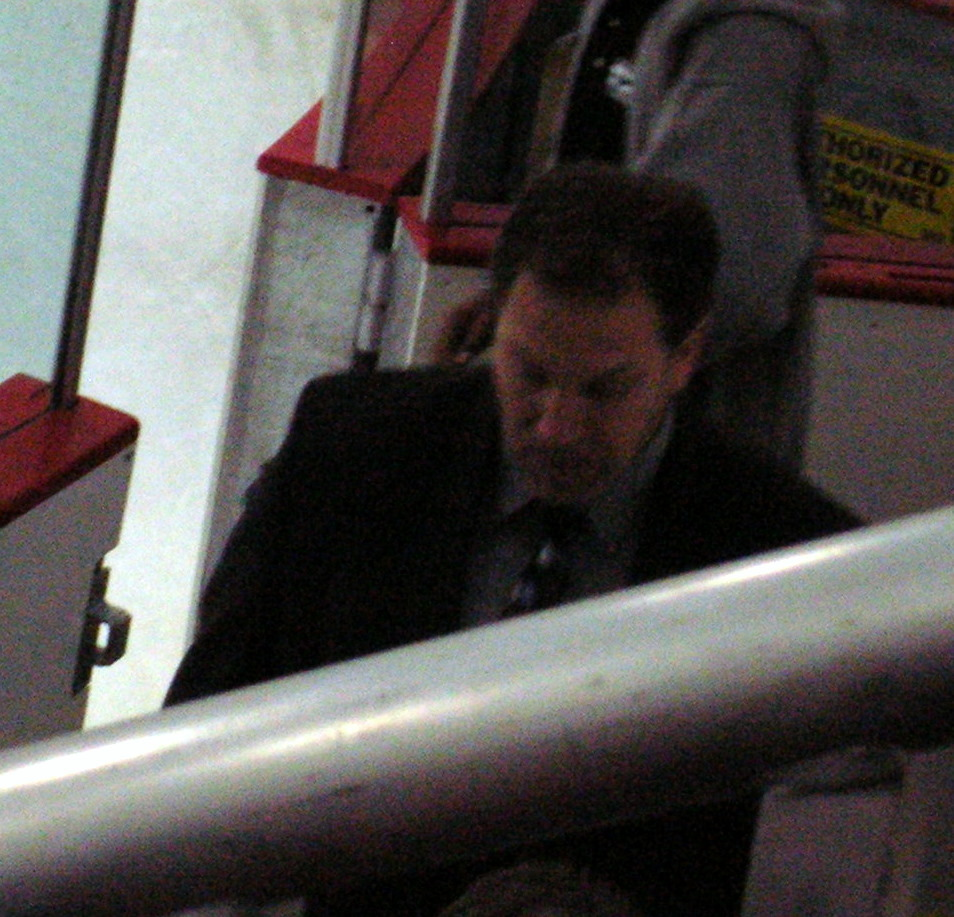
- Born: July 18, 1967 (age 59) Jasper, Alberta, Canada
- Height: 6 ft 4 in (193 cm)
- Weight: 225 lb (102 kg; 16 st 1 lb)
- Position: Defence
- Shot: Left
- Played for: Edmonton Oilers; Tampa Bay Lightning; New York Islanders
- NHL draft: 190th overall, 1987; Buffalo Sabres
- Playing career: 1992–2005

Ian Herbers (born July 18, 1967) is a Canadian former professional ice hockey defenceman, and former assistant coach for the Edmonton Oilers of the National Hockey League.

== Draft ==
Herbers was drafted in the tenth round, 190th overall, by the Buffalo Sabres in the 1987 NHL entry draft.

== Career ==
Herbers played four seasons in the Western Hockey League where he was coached by Graham James and played with Joe Sakic. This was followed by four seasons with the University of Alberta Golden Bears, where he earned a bachelor's degree in physical education and won the national championship in 1992. He made his pro debut with the Cape Breton Oilers, with whom he won the Calder Cup of the American Hockey League in the 1992–93 season. He made it to the NHL in the 1993–94 season, appearing in 22 games with the Edmonton Oilers.

Herbers would not find his way to the NHL again until the 1999–2000 season with the Tampa Bay Lightning. The Lightning then traded him to the New York Islanders on March 9, 2000, in exchange for a seventh-round pick in the 2000 NHL entry draft.

After finishing the season with the Islanders, Herbers was left unprotected in the 2000 NHL Expansion Draft and was picked by the Minnesota Wild. After spending the 2000–01 season with the Wild's International Hockey League affiliate, the Cleveland Lumberjacks, Herbers went to Great Britain. He played for the Ayr Scottish Eagles of the British Ice Hockey Superleague for one season and the Guildford Flames of the British National League for another. He briefly returned to North American hockey in the 2003–04 season, playing in four games for the United Hockey League's Flint Generals, before retiring.

== Coaching career ==
Herbers became an assistant coach with the AHL San Antonio Rampage in 2004 before the lockout. From the AHL, Herbers then moved to the Saginaw Spirit of the Ontario Hockey League (OHL) in 2005. He spent two years there, before being named the head coach of the ECHL's Johnstown Chiefs in 2007. On 5 August 2009, he became an assistant coach with the Milwaukee Admirals of the American Hockey League. On November 28, 2011, after the departure of Kirk Muller to the Carolina Hurricanes, Herbers was named head coach of the Milwaukee Admirals. In late May 2012 Herbers left the Milwaukee Admirals to begin coaching the men's hockey team at his alma mater, the University of Alberta.

He spent three seasons as head coach of the Alberta Golden Bears, earning Canada West Coach of the Year honours in his inaugural season and leading the team to three Canada West conference championships and consecutive Canadian Interuniversity Sport (CIS) national championships in 2013-14 and 2014-15.

Herbers also served as a coach for Team Canada at the 2015 IIHF U18 World Championship, where they won a bronze medal.

Herbers was hired as an assistant coach by the Edmonton Oilers in July 2015. The Oilers relieved Herbers of his coaching duties on April 27, 2018. Herbers returned as head coach of the University of Alberta Golden Bears hockey program on July 1, 2018.

== Career statistics ==
=== Regular season and playoffs ===
			Regular season					Playoffs
Season	Team	League	GP	G	A	Pts	PIM	GP	G	A	Pts	PIM
1984–85	Kelowna Wings	WHL	68	3	14	17	120	6	0	1	1	9
1985–86	Spokane Chiefs	WHL	29	1	6	7	85	—	—	—	—	—
1985–86	Lethbridge Broncos	WHL	32	1	4	5	109	10	0	1	1	37
1986–87	Swift Current Broncos	WHL	72	5	8	13	230	4	1	1	2	12
1987–88	Swift Current Broncos	WHL	56	5	14	19	238	4	0	2	2	4
1988–89	University of Alberta	CWUAA	47	4	22	26	137	—	—	—	—	—
1989–90	University of Alberta	CWUAA	45	5	31	36	83	—	—	—	—	—
1990–91	University of Alberta	CWUAA	45	6	24	30	87	—	—	—	—	—
1991–92	University of Alberta	CWUAA	43	14	34	48	86	—	—	—	—	—
1992–93	Cape Breton Oilers	AHL	77	7	15	22	129	10	0	1	1	16
1993–94	Cape Breton Oilers	AHL	53	7	16	23	122	5	0	3	3	12
1993–94	Edmonton Oilers	NHL	22	0	2	2	32	—	—	—	—	—
1994–95	Cape Breton Oilers	AHL	36	1	11	12	104	—	—	—	—	—
1994–95	Detroit Vipers	IHL	37	1	5	6	46	5	1	1	2	6
1995–96	Detroit Vipers	IHL	73	3	11	14	140	12	3	5	8	29
1996–97	Detroit Vipers	IHL	67	3	16	19	129	21	0	4	4	34
1997–98	Detroit Vipers	IHL	70	6	6	12	100	23	0	3	3	54
1998–99	Detroit Vipers	IHL	82	8	16	24	142	11	1	3	4	18
1999–00	Detroit Vipers	IHL	13	1	4	5	22	—	—	—	—	—
1999–00	Tampa Bay Lightning	NHL	37	0	0	0	45	—	—	—	—	—
1999–00	New York Islanders	NHL	6	0	3	3	2	—	—	—	—	—
2000–01	Cleveland Lumberjacks	IHL	78	3	7	10	179	4	0	1	1	10
2001–02	Ayr Scottish Eagles	BISL	41	2	13	15	106	—	—	—	—	—
2002–03	Guildford Flames	BNL	36	1	18	19	54	—	—	—	—	—
2003–04	Flint Generals	UHL	4	0	1	1	4	—	—	—	—	—
IHL totals			420	25	65	90	758	76	5	17	22	151
NHL totals			65	0	5	5	79	—	—	—	—	—

Preceded by Frank Anzalone	Head coaches of the Johnstown Chiefs; 2007-2009	Succeeded by Jeff Flanagan
