= Thomas Sjögren =

Swedish ice hockey player

- Born: June 8, 1968 (age 57) Gothenburg, Sweden
- Height: 5 ft 10 in (178 cm)
- Weight: 185 lb (84 kg; 13 st 3 lb)
- Position: Winger
- Shot: Right
- NHL draft: 168th overall, 1987; Washington Capitals
- Playing career: 1983–2005

Thomas Peter Sjögren (born June 8, 1968) is a retired Swedish professional ice hockey player. He scored six goals and nine assists at the 1988 World Junior Ice Hockey Championships. He is currently an assistant coach for Södertälje SK in Elitserien.

== Career statistics ==
			Regular season					Playoffs
Season	Team	League	GP	G	A	Pts	PIM	GP	G	A	Pts	PIM
1983–84	Tegs SK	Div. 1	1	0	0	0	0	—	—	—	—	—
1984–85	Tegs SK	Div. 1	28	23	10	33	14	—	—	—	—	—
1985–86	Tegs SK	Div. 1	29	15	10	25	24	—	—	—	—	—
1986–87	Västra Frölunda HC	Div. 1	25	23	10	33	10	2	1	2	3	0
1987–88	Västra Frölunda HC	Div. 1	36	36	27	63	42	10	6	6	12	8
1988–89	Södertälje SK	SEL	40	23	19	42	22	5	1	0	1	6
1989–90	Södertälje SK	SEL	33	7	8	15	14	2	0	1	1	0
1990–91	Baltimore Skipjacks	AHL	72	29	24	53	34	2	0	1	1	0
1991–92	Västra Frölunda HC	SEL	39	8	16	24	16	3	0	1	1	0
1992–93	Västra Frölunda HC	SEL	22	11	8	19	34	—	—	—	—	—
1992–93	Västra Frölunda HC	Div. 1	18	14	17	31	14	3	2	4	6	2
1993–94	Västra Frölunda HC	SEL	35	21	10	31	18	4	1	1	2	2
1994–95	Västra Frölunda HC	SEL	22	2	10	12	6	—	—	—	—	—
1994–95	Västra Frölunda HC	Div. 1	7	5	4	9	6	5	5	4	9	6
1995–96	JYP	SM-liiga	48	22	25	47	32	—	—	—	—	—
1996–97	JYP	SM-liiga	40	31	20	51	24	4	1	1	2	0
1997–98	Eisbären Berlin	DEL	56	23	21	44	8	—	—	—	—	—
1998–99	Luleå HF	SEL	48	28	12	40	18	9	5	3	8	6
1999–00	Berlin Capitals	DEL	50	20	31	51	20	7	3	1	4	2
2000–01	Berlin Capitals	DEL	54	16	28	44	45	4	0	0	0	0
2001–02	AIK	SEL	47	9	19	28	36	—	—	—	—	—
2001–02	AIK	SA	—	—	—	—	—	8	3	4	7	8
2002–03	Malmö Redhawks	SEL	13	3	4	7	2	—	—	—	—	—
2002–03	Milano Vipers	Serie A	15	8	16	24	12	8	4	2	6	0
2003–04	Jokerit	SM-liiga	20	1	2	3	6	—	—	—	—	—
2003–04	Milano Vipers	Serie A	21	6	13	19	4	—	—	—	—	—
2004–05	Borås HC	Div. 1	14	5	10	15	22	8	0	4	4	4
