= Aleksandrs Cuncukovs =

Latvian ice hockey player

- Born: April 3, 1971; Riga, Latvian SSR, Soviet Union
- Height: 6 ft 1 in (185 cm)
- Weight: 194 lb (88 kg; 13 st 12 lb)
- Position: Right wing
- Shot: Left
- Played for: Soviet/Russia; Stars Riga; Riga Pardaugava; ECHL; Raleigh Icecaps; Nashville Knights; Johnstown Chiefs; CHL; Nashville Ice Flyers; Fayetteville Force; Huntsville Tornado
- National team: Latvia
- Playing career: 1991–2001

Aleksandrs Cuncukovs (born April 3, 1971), commonly spelled as Alexander Chunchukov in North America, is a Latvian former professional ice hockey player.

== Career ==
Cuncukovs played his professional career in Russia (1991–94). He continued his career in the East Coast Hockey League (now ECHL) with stops in Raleigh (1994–95), Nashville (1995–96), and Johnstown (1996–97). After leaving the ECHL, he joined the Central Hockey League and played in Nashville (1997–98), Fayetteville (1998–2001), eventually playing the final ten games of his career with the Huntsville Tornado in 2001.

Cuncukovs represented his country twice at the World Cup, playing with the Latvia men's national ice hockey team at the 1994 and 1996 Men's World Ice Hockey Championships.

== Awards and accomplishments ==
- 1997–98: CHL All-Star Game
- 1997–98: CHL All-Star Game MVP (as a member of the Nashville Ice Flyers)
- 1998–99: CHL All-Star

== Transactions ==
1998: Acquired by the Fayetteville Force via Dispersal Draft

== Statistics ==
=== Regular season and playoffs ===
			Regular season					Playoffs
Season	Team	League	GP	G	A	Pts	PIM	GP	G	A	Pts	PIM
1989–90	SKA Leningrad-2	Soviet-3	37	1	9	10	16	—	—	—	—	—
1990–91	SKA St. Petersburg-2	Soviet-3	59	16	22	38	32	—	—	—	—	—
1991–92	Stars Riga	SovCh	2	0	0	0	0	22	2	4	6	6
1991–92	RASMS Riga	Soviet-3	34	23	13	36	16	—	—	—	—	—
1992–93	Pardaugava Riga	IHL	35	3	5	8	26	2	0	1	1	0
1992–93	Pardaugava Riga-2	Latvia	14	14	24	38	14	—	—	—	—	—
1993–94	Pardaugava Riga	IHL	36	10	13	23	14	—	—	—	—	—
1993–94	Latvia	WC-B	—	—	—	—	—	7	6	0	6	4
1994–95	Raleigh IceCaps	ECHL	32	7	18	25	30	—	—	—	—	—
1994–95	Nashville Knights	ECHL	29	11	25	36	72	11	4	11	15	4
1995–96	Nashville Knights	ECHL	55	20	31	51	51	—	—	—	—	—
1995–96	Latvia	WC-B	—	—	—	—	—	7	0	1	1	2
1996–97	Johnstown Chiefs	ECHL	70	34	58	92	75	—	—	—	—	—
1997–98	Nashville Ice Flyers	CHL	69	33	69	102	45	9	3	8	11	8
1998–99	Fayetteville Force	CHL	45	24	36	60	36	—	—	—	—	—
1999–00	Fayetteville Force	CHL	69	25	49	74	48	4	0	0	0	4
2000–01	Fayetteville Force	CHL	57	19	46	65	24	5	3	3	6	4
2000–01	Huntsville Tornado	CHL	10	3	7	10	4	—	—	—	—	—
Soviet-3 totals			130	48	36	84	64	—	—	—	—	—
SovCh/IHL totals			73	13	18	31	40	24	4	3	7	6
ECHL totals			186	72	132	204	188	11	4	11	15	4
CHL totals			250	104	207	311	157	13	3	8	11	12
World Cup B totals			—	—	—	—	—	14	6	1	7	6
