= 1987 NHL entry draft =

1987 North American ice hockey draft

General information
- Date: June 13, 1987
- Location: Joe Louis Arena; Detroit, Michigan, U.S.

Overview
- 252 total selections in 12 rounds
- First selection: (Canada) Pierre Turgeon (Buffalo Sabres)
- Hall of Famers: 3: C Pierre Turgeon; LW Brendan Shanahan; C Joe Sakic

The 1987 NHL entry draft was the 25th draft for the National Hockey League. It was held at Joe Louis Arena in Detroit, and was the first draft held in the United States. The NHL teams selected 252 players eligible for entry into professional ranks, in the reverse order of the 1986–87 NHL season and playoff standings.

The last active player in the NHL from this draft class was Mathieu Schneider, who retired after the 2009–10 season.

== Selections by round ==
Below are listed the selections in the 1987 NHL entry draft. Club teams are located in North America unless otherwise noted.

=== Round one ===
= NHL All-Star team ·	= NHL All-Star (Note: Players are identified as an All-Star if they were selected for the All-Star game at any time in their career.) ·	= NHL All-Star and NHL All-Star team ·	= Hall of Famers

#	Player	Nationality	NHL team	College/junior/club team
1	Pierre Turgeon (C)	Canada	Buffalo Sabres	Granby Bisons (QMJHL)
2	Brendan Shanahan (LW)	Canada	New Jersey Devils	London Knights (OHL)
3	Glen Wesley (D)	Canada	Boston Bruins (from Vancouver)^{1}	Portland Winter Hawks (WHL)
4	Wayne McBean (D)	Canada	Los Angeles Kings (from Minnesota)^{2}	Medicine Hat Tigers (WHL)
5	Chris Joseph (D)	Canada	Pittsburgh Penguins	Seattle Thunderbirds (WHL)
6	Dave Archibald (RW)	Canada	Minnesota North Stars (from Los Angeles)^{3}	Portland Winter Hawks (WHL)
7	Luke Richardson (D)	Canada	Toronto Maple Leafs	Peterborough Petes (OHL)
8	Jimmy Waite (G)	Canada	Chicago Blackhawks	Chicoutimi Sagueneens (QMJHL)
9	Bryan Fogarty (D)	Canada	Quebec Nordiques	Kingston Canadians (OHL)
10	Jayson More (D)	Canada	New York Rangers	New Westminster Bruins (WHL)
11	Yves Racine (D)	Canada	Detroit Red Wings	Longueuil Chevaliers (QMJHL)
12	Keith Osborne (RW)	Canada	St. Louis Blues	North Bay Centennials (OHL)
13	Dean Chynoweth (D)	Canada	New York Islanders	Medicine Hat Tigers (WHL)
14	Stephane Quintal (D)	Canada	Boston Bruins	Granby Bisons (QMJHL)
15	Joe Sakic (C)	Canada	Quebec Nordiques (from Washington)^{4}	Swift Current Broncos (WHL)
16	Bryan Marchment (D)	Canada	Winnipeg Jets	Belleville Bulls (OHL)
17	Andrew Cassels (C)	Canada	Montreal Canadiens	Ottawa 67's (OHL)
18	Jody Hull (RW)	Canada	Hartford Whalers	Peterborough Petes (OHL)
19	Bryan Deasley (LW)	Canada	Calgary Flames	University of Michigan (CCHA)
20	Darren Rumble (D)	Canada	Philadelphia Flyers	Kitchener Rangers (OHL)
21	Peter Soberlak (LW)	Canada	Edmonton Oilers	Swift Current Broncos (WHL)
^{Reference:}

1. Vancouver's first-round pick went to Boston as the result of a trade on June 6, 1986 that sent Barry Pederson to Vancouver in exchange for Cam Neely and this pick.
2. Minnesota's first-round pick went to Los Angeles as the result of a trade on June 13, 1987 that sent Los Angeles' first-round (# 6) and third-round picks in the 1987 Entry Draft in exchange for this pick.
3. Los Angeles' first-round pick went to Minnesota as the result of a trade on June 13, 1987 that sent Minnesota's first-round (# 4) to Los Angeles in exchange for a third-round pick in the 1987 Entry Draft and this pick.
4. Washington's first-round pick went to Quebec as the result of a trade on June 13, 1987 that sent Dale Hunter and Clint Malarchuk to Washington in exchange for Gaetan Duchesne, Alan Haworth and this pick.

=== Round two ===
#	Player	Nationality	NHL team	College/junior/club team
22	Brad Miller (D)	Canada	Buffalo Sabres	Regina Pats (WHL)
23	Ricard Persson (D)	Sweden	New Jersey Devils	Ostersunds IK (Sweden)
24	Rob Murphy (C)	Canada	Vancouver Canucks	Laval Titan (QMJHL)
25	Stephane Matteau (LW)	Canada	Calgary Flames (from Minnesota)^{1}	Hull Olympiques (QMJHL)
26	Rick Tabaracci (G)	Canada	Pittsburgh Penguins	Cornwall Royals (OHL)
27	Mark Fitzpatrick (G)	Canada	Los Angeles Kings	Medicine Hat Tigers (WHL)
28	Daniel Marois (RW)	Canada	Toronto Maple Leafs	Verdun Junior Canadiens (QMJHL)
29	Ryan McGill (D)	Canada	Chicago Blackhawks	Swift Current Broncos (WHL)
30	Jeff Harding (RW)	Canada	Philadelphia Flyers (from Quebec)^{2}	St. Michael's Buzzers (MetJHL)
31	Daniel Lacroix (LW)	Canada	New York Rangers	Granby Bisons (QMJHL)
32	Gord Kruppke (D)	Canada	Detroit Red Wings	Prince Albert Raiders (WHL)
33	John LeClair (RW)	United States	Montreal Canadiens (from St. Louis)^{3}	Bellows Free Academy (USHS–VT)
34	Jeff Hackett (G)	Canada	New York Islanders	Oshawa Generals (OHL)
35	Scott McCrady (D)	Canada	Minnesota North Stars (from Boston)^{4}	Medicine Hat Tigers (WHL)
36	Jeff Ballantyne (D)	Canada	Washington Capitals	Ottawa 67's (OHL)
37	Patrik Erickson (D)	Sweden	Winnipeg Jets	Brynas IF (Sweden)
38	Eric Desjardins (D)	Canada	Montreal Canadiens	Granby Bisons (QMJHL)
39	Adam Burt (D)	United States	Hartford Whalers	North Bay Centennials (OHL)
40	Kevin Grant (LW)	Canada	Calgary Flames	Kitchener Rangers (OHL)
41	Bob Wilkie (D)	Canada	Detroit Red Wings (from Philadelphia)^{5}	Swift Current Broncos (WHL)
42	Brad Werenka (D)	Canada	Edmonton Oilers	Northern Michigan University (WCHA)
^{Reference:}

1. Minnesota's second-round pick went to Calgary as the result of a trade on June 15, 1985 that sent Kent Nilsson and an optional third-round picks in 1986 entry draft or 1987 Entry Draft to Calgary in exchange for Minnesota' second-round pick in 1985 entry draft and this pick.
2. Quebec's second-round pick went to Philadelphia as the result of a trade on June 21, 1986 that sent Philadelphia's second-round pick in 1986 Entry Draft to Quebec in exchange for this pick.
3. St. Louis' second-round pick went to Montreal as the result of a trade on June 12, 1987 that sent Montreal's third-round pick in 1987 Entry Draft and second-round pick in 1988 entry draft in exchange for St. Louis' fifth-round pick in 1988 Entry Draft and this pick.
4. Boston's second-round pick went to Minnesota as the result of a trade on May 16, 1986 that sent Tom McCarthy to Boston in exchange for Boston's third-round pick in 1986 Entry Draft and this pick.
5. Philadelphia's second-round pick went to Detroit as the result of a trade on June 13, 1987 that sent Mark Laforest to Philadelphia in exchange this pick.

=== Round three ===
#	Player	Nationality	NHL team	College/junior/club team
43	Ross Wilson (RW)	Canada	Los Angeles Kings (from Buffalo)^{1}	Peterborough Petes (OHL)
44	Mathieu Schneider (D)	United States	Montreal Canadiens (from New Jersey)^{2}	Cornwall Royals (OHL)
45	Steve Veilleux (D)	Canada	Vancouver Canucks	Trois-Rivieres Draveurs (QMJHL)
46	Simon Gagne (RW)	Canada	New York Rangers (from Minnesota)^{3}	Laval Titan (QMJHL)
47	Jamie Leach (RW)	Canada	Pittsburgh Penguins	Hamilton Steelhawks (OHL)
48	Kevin Kaminski (C)	Canada	Minnesota North Stars (from Los Angeles)^{4}	Saskatoon Blades (WHL)
49	John McIntyre (C)	Canada	Toronto Maple Leafs	Guelph Platers (OHL)
50	Cam Russell (D)	Canada	Chicago Blackhawks	Hull Olympiques (QMJHL)
51	Jim Sprott (D)	Canada	Quebec Nordiques	London Knights (OHL)
52	Dennis Holland (C)	Canada	Detroit Red Wings (from the Rangers)^{5}	Portland Winter Hawks (WHL)
53	Andrew MacVicar (LW)	Canada	Buffalo Sabres (from Detroit via New Jersey)^{6}	Peterborough Petes (OHL)
54	Kevin Miehm (C)	Canada	St. Louis Blues	Oshawa Generals (OHL)
55	Dean Ewen (LW)	Canada	New York Islanders	Spokane Chiefs (WHL)
56	Todd Lalonde (LW)	Canada	Boston Bruins	Sudbury Wolves (OHL)
57	Steve Maltais (W)	Canada	Washington Capitals	Cornwall Royals (OHL)
58	Francois Gravel (G)	Canada	Montreal Canadiens (from Winnipeg)^{7}	Shawinigan Cataractes (QMJHL)
59	Robert Nordmark (D)	Sweden	St. Louis Blues (from Montreal)^{8}	Lulea HF (Sweden)
60	Mike Dagenais (D)	Canada	Chicago Blackhawks (from Hartford)^{9}	Peterborough Petes (OHL)
61	Scott Mahoney (RW)	Canada	Calgary Flames	Oshawa Generals (OHL)
62	Martin Hostak (RW)	Czechoslovakia	Philadelphia Flyers	Sparta Prague (Czechoslovakia)
63	Geoff Smith (D)	Canada	Edmonton Oilers	St. Albert Saints (AJHL)
^{Reference: "1987 NHL Entry Draft Picks at hockeydb.com". Archived from the original on March 7, 2009.}

1. Buffalo's third-round pick went to Los Angeles as the result of a trade on April 22, 1986 that sent Los Angeles' eighth-round pick in the 1987 Entry Draft and future considerations to Buffalo in exchange for this pick.
2. New Jersey's third-round pick went to Montreal as the result of a trade on June 13, 1987 that sent David Maley to New Jersey in exchange for this pick.
3. Minnesota's third-round pick went to the Rangers as the result of a trade on September 8, 1986 that sent Brian MacLellan to Minnesota in exchange for this pick (being conditional at the time of the trade). The condition – the Rangers receives a 3rd-rd pick if MacLellan scores 25 or more goals in the 1986-87 season or a 4th-rd pick if less than 25 goals - was converted on March 3, 1987 scoring his 25th goal of the season.
4. Los Angeles' third-round pick went to Minnesota as the result of a trade on June 13, 1987 that sent Minnesota's first-round to Los Angeles in exchange for a first-round pick in the 1987 Entry Draft and this pick.
5. The Rangers' third-round pick went to Detroit as the result of a trade on July 29, 1986 that sent Kelly Kisio, Lane Lambert, Jim Leavins and Detroit's fifth-round pick in 1988 entry draft to the Rangers in exchange for Glen Hanlon, the Rangers' third-round pick in 1988 entry draft and this pick.
6. New Jersey's third-round pick went to Buffalo as the result of a trade on June 13, 1987 that sent Tom Kurvers to New Jersey in exchange for New Jersey's tenth-round pick in 1989 entry draft and this pick.
  New Jersey previously acquired this pick as the result of a trade with Detroit on March 9, 1987 that sent Mel Bridgman to Detroit in exchange for Chris Cichocki and this pick.
7. Winnipeg's third-round pick went to Montreal as the result of a trade on January 8, 1987 that sent Steve Rooney to Winnipeg in exchange for this pick.
8. Montreal's third-round pick went to St. Louis as the result of a trade on June 12, 1987 that sent St. Louis' second-round pick in 1987 Entry Draft and fifth-round pick in 1988 entry draft in exchange for Montreal's second-round pick in 1988 entry draft and this pick.
9. The Hartford Whalers' third-round pick went to the Chicago Black Hawks as the result of a trade on February 3, 1986 that sent Bill Gardner to Hartford in exchange for an optional third-round picks in 1986 NHL entry draft or 1987 NHL Entry Draft (this pick).

=== Round four ===
#	Player	Nationality	NHL team	College/junior/club team
64	Peter Eriksson (LW)	Sweden	Edmonton Oilers (from Buffalo)^{1}	HV71 (Sweden)
65	Brian Sullivan (RW)	United States	New Jersey Devils	Springfield Olympics (NEJHL)
66	Doug Torrel (RW)	United States	Vancouver Canucks	Hibbing High School (USHS–MN)
67	Darwin McPherson (D)	Canada	Boston Bruins (from Minnesota)^{2}	New Westminster Bruins (WHL)
68	Risto Kurkinen (LW)	Finland	Pittsburgh Penguins	JYP (Finland)
69	Mike Sullivan (C)	United States	New York Rangers (from Los Angeles)^{3}	Boston University (Hockey East)
70	Tim Harris (RW)	Canada	Calgary Flames (from Toronto)^{4}	Pickering Panthers (OPJHL)
71	Joe Sacco (RW)	United States	Toronto Maple Leafs	Medford High School (USHS–MA)
72	Kip Miller (C)	United States	Quebec Nordiques	Michigan State University (CCHA)
73	John Weisbrod (C)	United States	Minnesota North Stars (from the Rangers)^{5}	Choate Rosemary Hall (USHS–CT)
74	Mark Reimer (G)	Canada	Detroit Red Wings	Saskatoon Blades (WHL)
75	Darin Smith (LW)	Canada	St. Louis Blues	North Bay Centennials (OHL)
76	George Maneluk (G)	Canada	New York Islanders	Brandon Wheat Kings (WHL)
77	Matt DelGuidice (G)	United States	Boston Bruins	Saint Anselm College (ECAC East)
78	Tyler Larter (C)	Canada	Washington Capitals	Sault Ste. Marie Greyhounds (OHL)
79	Don McLennan (D)	Canada	Winnipeg Jets	University of Denver (WCHA)
80	Kris Miller (D)	United States	Montreal Canadiens	Greenway High School (USHS–MN)
81	Terry Yake (C)	Canada	Hartford Whalers	Brandon Wheat Kings (WHL)
82	Andy Rymsha (RW)	Canada	St. Louis Blues (from Calgary)^{6}	Western Michigan University (CCHA)
83	Tomaz Eriksson (LW)	Sweden	Philadelphia Flyers	Djurgardens IF (Sweden)
84	John Bradley (G)	United States	Buffalo Sabres (from Edmonton)^{7}	New Hampton School (USHS–NH)
^{Reference: "1987 NHL Entry Draft Picks at hockeydb.com". Archived from the original on March 7, 2009.}

1. Buffalo's fourth-round pick went to Edmonton as the result of a trade on March 6, 1987 that sent Lee Fogolin Jr., Mark Napier and Edmonton's fourth-round pick in the 1987 Entry Draft to Buffalo in exchange for Normand Lacombe, Wayne Van Dorp and this pick.
2. Minnesota's fourth-round pick went to Boston as the result of a trade on March 10, 1987 that sent Paul Boutilier to Minnesota in exchange for this pick.
3. Los Angeles' fourth-round pick went to the Rangers as the result of a trade on December 9, 1985 that sent Grant Ledyard and Roland Melanson to Los Angeles in exchange for Brian MacLellan and this pick.
4. Toronto's fourth-round pick went to Calgary as the result of a trade on May 29, 1985 that sent Don Edwards to Toronto in exchange for future considerations. These considerations became an optional third-round or fourth-round pick (this pick) in the 1987 Entry Draft.
5. The Rangers' fourth-round pick went to the Minnesota North Stars as the result of a trade on December 9, 1985 that sent Roland Melanson to the Rangers in exchange for the Ranger's second-round pick in 1986 entry draft and this pick.
6. Calgary's fourth-round pick went to St. Louis as the result of a trade on June 13, 1987 that sent Ric Nattress to Calgary in exchange for a fifth-round pick in the 1988 entry draft and this pick.
7. Edmonton's fourth-round pick went to Buffalo as the result of a trade on March 6, 1987 that sent Normand Lacombe, Wayne Van Dorp and Buffalo's fourth-round pick in the 1987 Entry Draft to Edmonton in exchange for Lee Fogolin Jr., Mark Napier and this pick.

=== Round five ===
#	Player	Nationality	NHL team	College/junior/club team
85	Dave Pergola (RW)	United States	Buffalo Sabres	Belmont Hill School (USHS–MA)
86	Kevin Dean (D)	United States	New Jersey Devils	Culver Military Academy (USHS–IN)
87	Sean Fabian (D)	United States	Vancouver Canucks (from Vancouver via Philadelphia)^{1}	Hill-Murray School (USHS–MN)
88	Teppo Kivela (C)	Finland	Minnesota North Stars	HPK (Finland)
89	Jeff Waver (D)	Canada	Pittsburgh Penguins	Hamilton Steelhawks (OHL)
90	Mike Vukonich (C)	United States	Los Angeles Kings	Denfeld High School (USHS–MN)
91	Mike Eastwood (C)	Canada	Toronto Maple Leafs	Pembroke Lumber Kings (CJAHL)
92	Ulf Sandstrom (RW)	Sweden	Chicago Blackhawks	Modo Hockey (Sweden)
93	Rob Mendel (D)	United States	Quebec Nordiques	University of Wisconsin (WCHA)
94	Eric O'Borsky (C)	United States	New York Rangers	Yale University (ECAC)
95	Radomir Brazda (D)	Czechoslovakia	Detroit Red Wings	LTC Pardubice (Czechoslovakia)
96	Ken Gernander (RW)	United States	Winnipeg Jets (from St. Louis)^{2}	Greenway High School (USHS–MN)
97	Petr Vlk (LW)	Czechoslovakia	New York Islanders	Dukla Jihlava (Czechoslovakia)
98	Ted Donato (LW)	United States	Boston Bruins	Catholic Memorial School (USHS–MA)
99	Pat Beauchesne (D)	Canada	Washington Capitals	Moose Jaw Warriors (WHL)
100	Darrin Amundson (C)	United States	Winnipeg Jets	East High School (USHS–MN)
101	Steve McCool (D)	United States	Montreal Canadiens	The Hill School (USHS–PA)
102	Mark Rousseau (D)	Canada	Hartford Whalers	University of Denver (WCHA)
103	Tim Corkery (D)	Canada	Calgary Flames	Ferris University (CCHA)
104	Bill Gall (D)	United States	Philadelphia Flyers	New Hampton School (USHS–NH)
105	Shaun Van Allen (C)	Canada	Edmonton Oilers	Saskatoon Blades (WHL)
^{Reference: "1987 NHL Entry Draft Picks at hockeydb.com". Archived from the original on March 7, 2009.}

1. Vancouver's fifth-round pick was re-acquired as the result of a trade on June 13, 1987 that sent Vancouver's fifth round pick in 1989 entry draft to Philadelphia in exchange for this pick.
  Philadelphia previously acquired this pick as the result of a trade on June 6, 1986 that sent Dave Richter, Rich Sutter and Philadelphia's third-round pick in 1989 entry draft to Vancouver in exchange for Jean-Jacques Daigneault, Vancouver's second-round pick in 1989 entry draft and this pick.
2. St. Louis' fifth-round pick went to Winnipeg as the result of a trade on June 1, 1987 that sent Perry Turnbull to St. Louis in exchange for this pick.

=== Round six ===
#	Player	Nationality	NHL team	College/junior/club team
106	Chris Marshall (LW)	United States	Buffalo Sabres	Boston College High School (USHS–MA)
107	Ben Hankinson (RW)	United States	New Jersey Devils	Edina High School (USHS–MN)
108	Garry Valk (LW)	Canada	Vancouver Canucks	Sherwood Park Crusaders (AJHL)
109	Darcy Norton (LW)	Canada	Minnesota North Stars	Kamloops Blazers (WHL)
110	Shawn McEachern (LW)	United States	Pittsburgh Penguins	Matignon High School (USHS–MA)
111	Greg Batters (RW)	Canada	Los Angeles Kings	Victoria Cougars (WHL)
112	Damian Rhodes (G)	United States	Toronto Maple Leafs	Richfield High School (USHS–MN)
113	Mike McCormick (RW)	United States	Chicago Blackhawks	Richmond Sockeyes (BCJHL)
114	Garth Snow (G)	United States	Quebec Nordiques	Mount Saint Charles Academy (USHS–RI)
115	Ludek Cajka (D)	Czechoslovakia	New York Rangers	Dukla Jihlava (Czechoslovakia)
116	Sean Clifford (D)	Canada	Detroit Red Wings	Ohio State University (CCHA)
117	Rob Robinson (D)	Canada	St. Louis Blues	Miami University (CCHA)
118	Rob DiMaio (RW)	Canada	New York Islanders	Medicine Hat Tigers (WHL)
119	Matt Glennon (LW)	United States	Boston Bruins	Archbishop Williams High School (USHS–MA)
120	Rich DeFreitas (D)	United States	Washington Capitals	St. Mark's School (USHS–MA)
121	Joe Harwell (D)	United States	Winnipeg Jets	Hill-Murray School (USHS–MN)
122	Les Kuntar (G)	United States	Montreal Canadiens	Nichols School (USHS–NY)
123	Jeff St. Cyr (D)	Canada	Hartford Whalers	Michigan Technological University (WCHA)
124	Joe Aloi (D)	United States	Calgary Flames	Hull Olympiques (QMJHL)
125	Tony Link (D)	United States	Philadelphia Flyers	Dimond High School (USHS–AK)
126	Radek Toupal (RW)	Czechoslovakia	Edmonton Oilers	Motor Ceske Budejovice (Czechoslovakia)
^{Reference: "1987 NHL Entry Draft Picks at hockeydb.com". Archived from the original on March 7, 2009.}

=== Round seven ===
Seventh round pick Tod Hartje would become the first North American trained player to play professional hockey in the Soviet Union.

#	Player	Nationality	NHL team	College/junior/club team
127	Paul Flanagan (D)	United States	Buffalo Sabres	New Hampton School (USHS–NH)
128	Tom Neziol (LW)	Canada	New Jersey Devils	Miami University (CCHA)
129	Todd Fanning (G)	Canada	Vancouver Canucks	Ohio State University (CCHA)
130	Timo Kulonen (D)	Finland	Minnesota North Stars	KalPa (Finland)
131	Jim Bodden (C)	Canada	Pittsburgh Penguins	Chatham Maroons (SOJHL)
132	Kyosti Karjalainen (RW)	Sweden	Los Angeles Kings	Brynas IF (Sweden)
133	Trevor Jobe (C)	Canada	Toronto Maple Leafs	Moose Jaw Warriors (WHL)
134	Stephen Tepper (RW)	United States	Chicago Blackhawks	Westborough High School (USHS–MA)
135	Tim Hanus (LW)	United States	Quebec Nordiques	Minnetonka High School (USHS–MN)
136	Clint Thomas (D)	United States	New York Rangers	Bartlett High School (USHS–AK)
137	Mike Gober (LW)	United States	Detroit Red Wings	Laval Titan (QMJHL)
138	Todd Crabtree (D)	United States	St. Louis Blues	Governor Dummer Academy (USHS–MA)
139	Knut Walbye (C)	Norway	New York Islanders	Furuset (Norway)
140	Rob Cheevers (C)	United States	Boston Bruins	Boston College (Hockey East)
141	Devon Oleniuk (D)	Canada	Washington Capitals	Kamloops Blazers (WHL)
142	Tod Hartje (C)	United States	Winnipeg Jets	Harvard University (ECAC)
143	Robert Kelley (LW)	United States	Montreal Canadiens	Matignon High School (USHS–MA)
144	Gregg Wolf (D)	United States	Hartford Whalers	Buffalo Regals (EEMHL)
145	Peter Ciavaglia (C)	United States	Calgary Flames	Nichols School (USHS–NY)
146	Marc Strapon (D)	United States	Philadelphia Flyers	Hayward High School (USHS–WI)
147	Tomas Srsen (LW)	Czechoslovakia	Edmonton Oilers	Zetor Brno (Czechoslovakia)
^{Reference: "1987 NHL Entry Draft Picks at hockeydb.com". Archived from the original on March 7, 2009.}

=== Round eight ===
#	Player	Nationality	NHL team	College/junior/club team
148	Sean Dooley (D)	United States	Buffalo Sabres	Groton School (USHS–CT)
149	Jim Dowd (C)	United States	New Jersey Devils	Brick Township High School (USHS–NJ)
150	Viktor Tyumenev (C)	Soviet Union	Vancouver Canucks	Spartak Moscow (USSR)
151	Don Schmidt (D)	Canada	Minnesota North Stars	Kamloops Blazers (WHL)
152	Jiri Kucera (C)	Czechoslovakia	Pittsburgh Penguins	Dukla Jihlava (Czechoslovakia)
153	Tim Roberts (D)	United States	Buffalo Sabres (from Los Angeles)^{1}	Deerfield Academy (USHS–MA)
154	Chris Jensen (D)	United States	Toronto Maple Leafs	Northwood School (USHS–NY)
155	John Reilly (LW)	United States	Chicago Blackhawks	Phillips Andover Academy (USHS–MA)
156	Jake Enebak (LW)	United States	Quebec Nordiques	Northfield High School (USHS–MA)
157	Chuck Wiegand (RW)	United States	New York Rangers	Essex Junction High School (USHS–VT)
158	Kevin Scott (LW)	Canada	Detroit Red Wings	Vernon Lakers (BCJHL)
159	Guy Hebert (G)	United States	St. Louis Blues	Hamilton College (NESCAC)
160	Jeff Saterdalen (RW)	United States	New York Islanders	Bloomington Jefferson High School (USHS–MN)
161	Chris Winnes (RW)	United States	Boston Bruins	Northwood School (USHS–NY)
162	Thomas Sjogren (RW)	Sweden	Washington Capitals	Vastra Frolunda HC (Sweden)
163	Markku Kyllonen (LW)	Finland	Winnipeg Jets	Karpat (Finland)
164	Will Geist (D)	United States	Montreal Canadiens	St. Paul Academy and Summit School (USHS–MN)
165	John Moore (C)	Canada	Hartford Whalers	Yale University (ECAC)
166	Theoren Fleury (RW)	Canada	Calgary Flames	Moose Jaw Warriors (WHL)
167	Darryl Ingham (RW)	Canada	Philadelphia Flyers	University of Manitoba (CIAU)
168	Age Ellingsen (D)	Norway	Edmonton Oilers	Storhamar Dragons (Norway)
^{Reference: "1987 NHL Entry Draft Picks at hockeydb.com". Archived from the original on March 7, 2009.}

1. The Los Angeles Kings' eighth-round pick went to the Buffalo Sabres as the result of a trade on April 22, 1986 that sent Buffalo's third-round pick in 1987 NHL Entry Draft to Los Angeles in exchange for future considerations and this pick.

=== Round nine ===
#	Player	Nationality	NHL team	College/junior/club team
169	Grant Tkachuk (LW)	Canada	Buffalo Sabres	Saskatoon Blades (WHL)
170	John Blessman (D)	Canada	New Jersey Devils	Toronto Marlboros (OHL)
171	Craig Daly (D)	United States	Vancouver Canucks	New Hampton School (USHS–NH)
172	Jarmo Myllys (G)	Finland	Minnesota North Stars	Lukko (Finland)
173	John MacDougall (RW)	United States	Pittsburgh Penguins	New Preparatory School (USHS–MA)
174	Jeff Gawlicki (LW)	United States	Los Angeles Kings	Northern Michigan University (WCHA)
175	Brian Blad (D)	Canada	Toronto Maple Leafs	Belleville Bulls (OHL)
176	Lance Werness (RW)	United States	Chicago Blackhawks	Burnsville High School (USHS–MN)
177	Jaroslav Sevcik (LW)	Czechoslovakia	Quebec Nordiques	Zetor Brno (Czechoslovakia)
178	Eric Burrill (RW)	United States	New York Rangers	Tartan Senior High School (USHS–MN)
179	Mikko Haapakoski (D)	Finland	Detroit Red Wings	Karpat (Finland)
180	Rob Dumas (D)	Canada	St. Louis Blues	Seattle Thunderbirds (WHL)
181	Shawn Howard (D)	Canada	New York Islanders	Penticton Knights (BCJHL)
182	Paul Ohman (D)	United States	Boston Bruins	St. John's School (USHS–MA)
183	Ladislav Tresl (C)	Czechoslovakia	Quebec Nordiques (from Washington)^{1}	Zetor Brno (Czechoslovakia)
184	Jim Fernholz (RW)	United States	Winnipeg Jets	White Bear Lake Area High School (USHS–MN)
185	Eric Tremblay (D)	Canada	Montreal Canadiens	Drummondville Voltigeurs (QMJHL)
186	Joe Day (C)	United States	Hartford Whalers	St. Lawrence University (ECAC)
187	Mark Osiecki (D)	United States	Calgary Flames	University of Wisconsin (WCHA)
188	Bruce MacDonald (RW)	United States	Philadelphia Flyers	Loomis Chaffee School (USHS–MA)
189	Gavin Armstrong (G)	Canada	Edmonton Oilers	Rensselaer Polytechnic Institute (ECAC)
^{Reference: "1987 NHL Entry Draft Picks at hockeydb.com". Archived from the original on March 7, 2009.}

1. Washington's' ninth-round pick went to Quebec as the result of a trade on June 12, 1987 that sent Quebec's twelfth-round pick in 1987 Entry Draft and tenth-round pick in 1988 entry draft to Washington in exchange for Winnipeg's this pick.

=== Round ten ===
#	Player	Nationality	NHL team	College/junior/club team
190	Ian Herbers (D)	Canada	Buffalo Sabres	Swift Current Broncos (WHL)
191	Peter Fry (G)	Canada	New Jersey Devils	Victoria Cougars (WHL)
192	John Fletcher (G)	United States	Vancouver Canucks	Clarkson University (ECAC)
193	Larry Olimb (C)	United States	Minnesota North Stars	Warroad High School (USHS–MN)
194	Daryn McBride (RW)	Canada	Pittsburgh Penguins	University of Denver (WCHA)
195	John Preston (C)	Canada	Los Angeles Kings	Boston University (Hockey East)
196	Ron Bernacci (C)	Canada	Toronto Maple Leafs	Hamilton Steelhawks (OHL)
197	Dale Marquette (LW)	Canada	Chicago Blackhawks	Brandon Wheat Kings (WHL)
198	Darren Nauss (RW)	Canada	Quebec Nordiques	North Battleford North Stars (SJHL)
199	Dave Porter (LW)	United States	New York Rangers	Northern Michigan University (WCHA)
200	Darin Banister (D)	Canada	Detroit Red Wings	University of Illinois at Chicago (CCHA)
201	David Marvin (D)	United States	St. Louis Blues	Warroad High School (USHS–MN)
202	John Herlihy (RW)	United States	New York Islanders	Babson College (ECAC East)
203	Casey Jones (C)	United States	Boston Bruins	Cornell University (ECAC)
204	Chris Clarke (D)	Canada	Washington Capitals	Pembroke Lumber Kings (COJHL)
205	Brett Barnett (LW)	Canada	New York Rangers (from Winnipeg)^{1}	Wexford Raiders (OPJHL)
206	Barry McKinlay (D)	Canada	Montreal Canadiens	University of Illinois at Chicago (CCHA)
207	Andy Cesarski (D)	United States	St. Louis Blues (from Hartford)^{2}	Culver Military Academy (USHS–IN)
208	Bill Sedergren (D)	United States	Calgary Flames	Springfield Olympics (NEJHL)
209	Steve Morrow (D)	United States	Philadelphia Flyers	Westminster School (USHS–CT)
210	Mike Tinkham (C)	United States	Edmonton Oilers	Newburyport High School (USHS–MA)
^{Reference: "1987 NHL Entry Draft Picks at hockeydb.com". Archived from the original on March 7, 2009.}

1. Winnipeg's tenth-round pick went to the Rangers as the result of a trade on June 8, 1987 that sent the Ranger's fifth-round pick in the 1988 entry draft and third-round pick in the 1989 entry draft to Winnipeg in exchange for Brian Mullen and this pick.
2. Hartford's tenth-round pick went to St. Louis as the result of a trade on March 10, 1987 that sent Pat Hughes to Hartford in exchange for this pick.

=== Round eleven ===
#	Player	Nationality	NHL team	College/junior/club team
211	David Littman (G)	United States	Buffalo Sabres	Boston College (Hockey East)
212	Alain Charland (C)	Canada	New Jersey Devils	Drummondville Voltigeurs (QMJHL)
213	Roger Hansson (RW)	Sweden	Vancouver Canucks	Rogle BK (Sweden)
214	Marc Felicio (G)	United States	Minnesota North Stars	Northwood School (USHS–NY)
215	Mark Carlson (LW)	United States	Pittsburgh Penguins	Philadelphia Junior Flyers (ACJHL)
216	Rostislav Vlach (RW)	Czechoslovakia	Los Angeles Kings	TJ Gottwaldov (Czechoslovakia)
217	Ken Alexander (D)	Canada	Toronto Maple Leafs	Hamilton Steelhawks (OHL)
218	Bill LaCouture (RW)	United States	Chicago Blackhawks	Natick High School (USHS–MA)
219	Mike Williams (G)	United States	Quebec Nordiques	Ferris State University (CCHA)
220	Lance Marciano (D)	United States	New York Rangers	Choate Rosemary Hall (USHS–CT
221	Craig Quinlan (D)	United States	Detroit Red Wings	Hill-Murray School (USHS–MN)
222	Daniel Rolfe (D)	Canada	St. Louis Blues	Brockville Braves (OPJHL)
223	Mike Erickson (D)	United States	New York Islanders	St. John's Hill School (USHS–MA)
224	Eric LeMarque (C)	United States	Boston Bruins	Northern Michigan University (WCHA)
225	Milos Vanik (C)	West Germany	Washington Capitals	EHC Freiburg (West Germany)
226	Roger Rougelot (G)	United States	Winnipeg Jets	Madison Capitols (USHL)
227	Ed Ronan (RW)	United States	Montreal Canadiens	Phillips Andover Academy (USHS–MA)
228	Kevin Sullivan (RW)	United States	Hartford Whalers	Princeton University (ECAC)
229	Peter Hasselblad (D)	Sweden	Calgary Flames	Orebro IK (Sweden)
230	Darius Rusnak (C)	Czechoslovakia	Philadelphia Flyers	Slovan Bratislava (Czechoslovakia)
231	Jeff Pauletti (D)	United States	Edmonton Oilers	University of Minnesota (WCHA)
^{Reference: "1987 NHL Entry Draft Picks at hockeydb.com". Archived from the original on March 7, 2009.}

=== Round twelve ===
#	Player	Nationality	NHL team	College/junior/club team
232	Al MacIsaac (D)	Canada	Buffalo Sabres	Guelph Platers (OHL)
233	Neil Eisenhut (C)	Canada	Vancouver Canucks (from New Jersey)^{1}	Langley Eagles (BCJHL)
234	Matt Evo (LW)	United States	Vancouver Canucks	Country Day School (USHS–MA)
235	Dave Shields (C)	Canada	Minnesota North Stars	University of Denver (WCHA)
236	Ake Lilljebjorn (G)	Sweden	Pittsburgh Penguins	Brynas IF (Sweden)
237	Mikael Lindholm (LW)	Sweden	Los Angeles Kings	Brynas IF (Sweden)
238	Alex Weinrich (D)	United States	Toronto Maple Leafs	North Yarmouth Academy (USHS–ME)
239	Mike Lappin (C)	United States	Chicago Blackhawks	Northwood School (USHS–NY)
240	Dan Brettschneider (C)	United States	Washington Capitals (from Quebec)^{2}	Burnsville High School (USHS–MN)
241	Jesper Duus (D)	Denmark	Edmonton Oilers	Rodovre (Denmark)
242	Tomas Jansson (D)	Sweden	Detroit Red Wings	Sodertalje SK (Sweden)
243	Ray Savard (RW)	Canada	St. Louis Blues	Regina Pats (WHL)
244	Will Averill (D)	United States	New York Islanders	Belmont Hill School (USHS–MA)
245	Sean Gorman (D)	United States	Boston Bruins	Matignon High School (USHS–MA)
246	Ryan Kummu (D)	Canada	Washington Capitals	Rensselaer Polytechnic Institute (ECAC)
247	Hans-Goran Elo (G)	Sweden	Winnipeg Jets	Djurgardens IF (Sweden)
248	Bryan Herring (C)	United States	Montreal Canadiens	Dubuque Fighting Saints (USHL)
249	Steve Laurin (G)	Canada	Hartford Whalers	Dartmouth College (ECAC)
250	Magnus Svensson (D)	Sweden	Calgary Flames	Leksands IF (Sweden)
251	Dale Roehl (G)	United States	Philadelphia Flyers	Minnetonka High School (USHS–MN)
252	Igor Vyazmikin (LW)	Soviet Union	Edmonton Oilers	CSKA Moscow (USSR)
^{Reference: "1987 NHL Entry Draft Picks at hockeydb.com". Archived from the original on March 7, 2009.}

1. New Jersey's twelfth-round pick went to Vancouver as the result of a trade on June 1, 1987 that sent Shayne Doyle to New Jersey in exchange for this pick.
2. Quebec's twelfth-round pick went to Washington as the result of a trade on June 12, 1987 that sent Washington's ninth-round pick in the 1987 Entry Draft in exchange for Quebec's tenth-round pick in the 1988 entry draft and this pick.

== Draftees based on nationality ==
Rank	Country	Amount
	North America	215
1	Canada	116
2	United States	99
	Europe	37
3	Sweden	15
4	Czechoslovakia	10
5	Finland	6
6	Norway	2
6	Soviet Union	2
8	West Germany	1
8	Denmark	1

== See also ==
- 1987 NHL supplemental draft
- 1987–88 NHL season
- List of NHL players
