= Mikko Haapakoski =

Finnish ice hockey player and coach (born 1967)

- Born: 19 January 1967 (age 58); Oulu, Finland
- Height: 5 ft 9 in (175 cm)
- Weight: 176 lb (80 kg; 12 st 8 lb)
- Position: Defence
- Shot: Right
- Played for: Ilves (SM-liiga); TPS (SM-liiga); Kärpät (SM-liiga); SC Bern (NLA)
- National team: Finland
- NHL draft: 179th overall, 1987; Detroit Red Wings
- Playing career: 1986–2001

Mikko Haapakoski (born 19 January 1967, in Oulu, Finland) is a retired professional ice hockey defenceman. Haapakoski played 455 games in SM-liiga, and won bronze in 1986 and silver in 1987. He was signed by the Detroit Red Wings in 1987, but never played in the National Hockey League. He later coached professional and junior hockey for HC TPS.

== Playing career ==
=== Professional ===
Haapakoski played junior ice hockey with Oulun Kärpät, and later professional with them as of the 1985–86 season. In the spring of 1985, he had won the Finnish A-junior championship. Haapakoski won a Liiga silver medal in 1987, and a bronze in 1986. Kärpät were relegated from Liiga in the spring of 1989. In the 1986–87 and 1988–89 seasons, Haapakoski was the most effective defender for the Kärpät. He was drafted #179 overall by the Detroit Red Wings in the summer of 1987, but never played in the National Hockey League.

For the 1989–90 season, Haapakoski moved to HC TPS, where he played until the spring of 1993. While in Turku, Haapakoski won the Finnish Championship in the springs of 1990, 1991 and 1993.

Haapakoski spent 1993–1996 in Switzerland with SC Bern in the Nationalliga A. At the end of the 1994–95 season, he played for Wiener EV of the Austrian Erste Bank Eishockey Liga. In the 1993–94 season, Haapakoski was third in the Nationalliga A defenders' scoring list with 14+19=33. He was Bern's most effective defender, as he was in the 1995–96 season.

Haapakoski returned to the SM-liiga for the 1996–97 season and moved to Tampere Ilves. He won the Finnish Championship silver medal with Ilves in the spring of 1998. In the 1996–97 season, Haapakoski was the Ilves' most effective defender along with Allan Measures. In the 1997–98 season, he set his personal single-season points record in the SM-liiga with a power of 10+21=31. Haapakoski was third in the defensemen's scoring charts together with teammate Håkan Åhlund.

Haapakoski returned for the 1999–00 season to Kärpät, who played in the I-division. He was promoting his parent club back to the SM-liiga in the spring of 2000. Haapakoski was one of the key players in the promoted team and was selected to the Division I All-Star Team. Haapakoski played the 2000–01 season in the SM-liiga until he ended his playing career in spring 2001.

=== International ===
Haapakoski played for the Finland men's national under-18 team at the 1985 IIHF European U18 Championship. He later played for the Finland men's national junior team at the IIHF World Junior Championship in 1986, and won a gold medal in 1987.

Haapakoski also played for the Finland men's national team at the 1993 Men's Ice Hockey World Championships.

== Coaching career ==
After his playing career, Haapakoski moved on to coach the juniors of Kärpät. He became head coach of A-juniors in the 2002–03 season. After coaching the A-juniors, Haapakoski became the second coach of the adult representative team alongside Kari Jalonen for the 2004–05 season. As the second coach of Kärppi, Haapakoski won the Finnish championship in 2005, 2007 and 2008. He won bronze in 2006, and silver in 2009.

Haapakoski was to become the head coach of the Kärpät representative team in the 2010–11 season, but took over at the end of the 2009–10 season when Matti Alatalo was fired. In November 2010, Haapakoski was fired due to the team's poor performance and was replaced by Hannu Aravirta. In March 2011, Haapakoski signed a one-year contract as head coach of Joensuu Jokipojat, who play for Mestis. In March 2012, Jokipojat announced a contract extension, which allowed him to continue at the helm of the team on a two-year contract until spring 2014. In the spring of 2015, Haapakoski won the A-junior Finnish championship as head coach of TPS.

== Personal life ==
Haapakoski is the cousin of hockey player Lasse Pirjetä.

== Career statistics ==
			Regular season					Playoffs
Season	Team	League	GP	G	A	Pts	PIM	GP	G	A	Pts	PIM
1983–84	Kärpät U20	Jr. A SM-sarja	1	0	0	0	0	—	—	—	—	—
1984–85	Kärpät U20	Jr. A SM-sarja	26	9	12	21	10	—	—	—	—	—
1985–86	Kärpät U20	Jr. A SM-sarja	2	0	0	0	0	—	—	—	—	—
1985–86	Kärpät	Liiga	17	0	4	4	0	5	1	0	1	6
1986–87	Kärpät	Liiga	41	13	15	28	18	9	1	1	2	4
1987–88	Kärpät	Liiga	43	7	7	14	40	—	—	—	—	—
1988–89	Kärpät	Liiga	40	7	18	25	20	—	—	—	—	—
1989–90	HC TPS	Liiga	44	4	10	14	14	9	0	1	1	16
1990–91	HC TPS	Liiga	40	9	12	21	10	9	1	4	5	4
1991–92	HC TPS	Liiga	43	11	13	24	18	1	0	0	0	0
1992–93	HC TPS	Liiga	38	3	10	13	20	12	2	5	7	12
1993–94	SC Bern	NLA	35	14	19	33	30	5	0	9	9	10
1994–95	SC Bern	NLA	17	2	12	14	28	—	—	—	—	—
1994–95	Wiener EV	Austria	4	1	1	2	4	—	—	—	—	—
1995–96	SC Bern	NLA	31	6	15	21	14	—	—	—	—	—
1996–97	Ilves	Liiga	33	7	14	21	18	8	3	4	7	4
1997–98	Ilves	Liiga	39	10	21	31	44	9	0	4	4	8
1998–99	Ilves	Liiga	26	6	8	14	38	4	1	2	3	4
1999–00	Kärpät	I-Divisioona	37	8	21	29	83	—	—	—	—	—
2000–01	Kärpät	Liiga	40	2	14	16	34	6	0	1	1	2
Liiga totals			444	79	146	225	274	77	10	23	33	62
