= Ryan Del Monte =

Canadian ice hockey player

- Born: September 13, 1983 (age 42) Mississauga, Ontario, Canada
- Height: 6 ft 0 in (183 cm)
- Weight: 190 lb (86 kg; 13 st 8 lb)
- Position: Centre
- Shot: Right
- Played for: Lake Erie Monsters; Rochester Americans; Worcester Sharks; Starbulls Rosenheim
- NHL draft: Undrafted
- Playing career: 2008–2014

Ryan Del Monte (born September 13, 1983) is a Canadian former professional ice hockey player. He played in the American Hockey League (AHL).

== Playing career ==
Del Monte started the 2010–11 season with the Cincinnati Cyclones. In the following season, Del Monte started the 2011–12 season in the ECHL with the Kalamazoo Wings before he was loaned and remained with the Worcester Sharks of the AHL for the duration of the year.

On June 28, 2012, Del Monte signed his first European contract on a one-year deal with German 2nd Bundesliga Starbulls Rosenheim, where he scored 10 goals, and 20 assists for 30points in 42 games with Rosenheim.

On September 5, 2013, it was announced that Del Monte had signed to play with the Kalamazoo Wings of the ECHL.

== Career statistics ==
			Regular season					Playoffs
Season	Team	League	GP	G	A	Pts	PIM	GP	G	A	Pts	PIM
2000–01	Milton Merchants	OPJHL	10	1	4	5	6	—	—	—	—	—
2000–01	Thornhill Rattlers	OPJHL	10	2	7	9	26	—	—	—	—	—
2001–02	Sarnia Sting	OHL	67	6	11	17	62	5	1	0	1	2
2002–03	Sarnia Sting	OHL	64	10	15	25	42	6	0	1	1	2
2003–04	Georgetown Raiders	OPJHL	47	36	54	90	92	—	—	—	—	—
2004–05	Brock University	CIS	24	3	11	14	46	—	—	—	—	—
2005–06	Brock University	CIS	14	8	13	21	20	—	—	—	—	—
2006–07	Brock University	CIS	27	15	19	34	83	—	—	—	—	—
2007–08	Brock University	CIS	26	19	15	34	36	—	—	—	—	—
2008–09	Johnstown Chiefs	ECHL	69	16	32	48	81	—	—	—	—	—
2008–09	Lake Erie Monsters	AHL	5	0	2	2	4	—	—	—	—	—
2009–10	Johnstown Chiefs	ECHL	9	1	3	4	32	—	—	—	—	—
2009–10	Cincinnati Cyclones	ECHL	46	9	17	26	42	21	3	1	4	41
2010–11	Cincinnati Cyclones	ECHL	11	2	6	8	21	—	—	—	—	—
2010–11	Rochester Americans	AHL	24	3	3	6	29	—	—	—	—	—
2010–11	Worcester Sharks	AHL	15	1	3	4	13	—	—	—	—	—
2010–11	South Carolina Stingrays	ECHL	17	2	5	7	12	4	1	3	4	2
2011–12	Worcester Sharks	AHL	52	5	14	19	45	—	—	—	—	—
2012–13	Starbulls Rosenheim	2.GBun	42	10	20	30	30	13	2	8	10	33
2013–14	Kalamazoo Wings	ECHL	63	8	17	25	50	6	0	2	2	2
AHL totals			96	9	22	31	91	—	—	—	—	—
