= Nashville Ice Flyers =

Defunct American ice hockey team

- Sport: Ice hockey
- Founded: 1996
- Folded: 1998
- League: Central Hockey League
- Team history: Ice Flyers (1997-1998); Nighthawks (1996-1997)
- Location: Nashville, Tennessee, USA
- Arena: Nashville Municipal Auditorium

The Nashville Ice Flyers (named the Nashville Nighthawks for the 1996–97 season) were a professional ice hockey franchise that played in the Central Hockey League from 1996–1998. Based in Nashville, Tennessee, they played their home games at Nashville Municipal Auditorium.

== 1997–98 season ==
Alexsandr Chunchukov lead the team in points in the 1997–98 season, with 102 points. Iain Duncan also played for the Ice Flyers in the 1997–98 season. Duncan had previously spent time in the National Hockey League and the AHL. David Lohrei was the head coach for the 1997–98 season. Lohrei and his staff brought in 17 new players after taking over, many of whom were rookies in the league. The Ice Flyers powered their way to 41 wins in 1997–98, but were defeated by the Columbus Cottonmouths in the second round of the CHL playoffs. Scott Mikesh and Kevin McCaffrey assisted Lohrei with the coaching duties. The team folded shortly after the season, as the Nashville Predators, an expansion franchise of the National Hockey League, began play a few blocks away at Nashville Arena for the 1998–99 NHL season.
