= Matt Glennon (ice hockey) =

American ice hockey player (born 1968)

- Born: September 20, 1968 (age 57) Hull, Massachusetts, U.S.
- Height: 6 ft 0 in (183 cm)
- Weight: 185 lb (84 kg; 13 st 3 lb)
- Position: Left wing
- Shot: Left
- Played for: Boston Bruins
- NHL draft: 119th overall, 1987; Boston Bruins
- Playing career: 1991–1995

Matthew Joseph Glennon (born September 20, 1968) is an American retired ice hockey player who played three games in the National Hockey League for the Boston Bruins during the 1991–92 NHL season.

== Professional career ==
Glennon was drafted by the Boston Bruins 119th overall in the 1987 NHL entry draft. He spent four years in Boston College, playing a total of 96 games. He turned professional in 1991, splitting the year chiefly between the Johnstown Chiefs of the ECHL and the Maine Mariners of the American Hockey League (AHL). He played 30 games for the Chiefs, scoring nine goals and assisting on 46 more, for a total of 55 points. In the AHL, he made 32 appearances, scoring six goals and assisting on 12 more, for a total of 18 points. He was recalled by the Bruins for three games. In the NHL, he was held pointless while collecting two penalty minutes.

Glennon was returned to the Johnstown Chiefs for the 1991-92 ECHL playoffs. During a game against the Cincinnati Cyclones on March 29, 1992 at the Cambria County War Memorial Arena, Glennon and linemate Brian Ferreira were ejected for arguing separate two-line offside calls. When Ferreira was ejected, he threw a puck towards then-ECHL Commissioner Pat Kelly, took a pair of skateguards from Glennon and made an attempt to confront Kelly, apparently aiming for a microphone. Both players were originally suspended for 30 games, but upon appeal, Ferreira's suspension was reduced to 15 games, and Glennon's suspension was reduced to five games, given his minor role in the incident. Overall, Glennon played six playoff games, registering two goals and four assists, for a total of six points.

The following season, Glennon played only six games for the AHL's Providence Bruins, ending his affiliation with the Boston Bruins. Glennon played one more season with the Bayreuth Tigers of the German Second Bundesliga, before retiring at the conclusion of the 1993-94 season.

== Career statistics ==
			Regular season					Playoffs
Season	Team	League	GP	G	A	Pts	PIM	GP	G	A	Pts	PIM
1985–86	Archbishop Williams High	USHS-MA	18	18	22	40	6	—	—	—	—	—
1986–87	Archbishop Williams High	USHS-MA	18	22	36	58	20	—	—	—	—	—
1987–88	Boston College	NCAA	16	3	3	6	16	—	—	—	—	—
1988–89	Boston College	NCAA	16	1	6	7	4	—	—	—	—	—
1989–90	Boston College	NCAA	31	7	11	18	16	—	—	—	—	—
1990–91	Boston College	NCAA	33	6	9	15	36	—	—	—	—	—
1991–92	Boston Bruins	NHL	3	0	0	0	2	—	—	—	—	—
1991–92	Maine Mariners	AHL	32	6	12	18	13	—	—	—	—	—
1991–92	Johnstown Chiefs	ECHL	30	9	46	55	77	6	2	4	6	25
1992–93	Providence Bruins	AHL	6	1	3	4	4	—	—	—	—	—
1993–94	ERC Sonthofen	Germany3	9	4	10	14	16	—	—	—	—	—
NHL totals			3	0	0	0	2	—	—	—	—	—
AHL totals			38	7	15	22	17	—	—	—	—	—
