= Rob Dumas =

Canadian ice hockey player

- Born: March 19, 1969 (age 57) Spirit River, Alberta, Canada
- Height: 6 ft 0 in (183 cm)
- Weight: 200 lb (91 kg; 14 st 4 lb)
- Position: Defenceman
- Shot: Right
- Played for: Vancouver Voodoo; Orlando Jackals
- NHL draft: 180th overall, 1987; St. Louis Blues
- Playing career: 1994–1997

Rob Dumas (born March 19, 1969) is a Canadian retired professional roller hockey defenceman. He played 71 games in Roller Hockey International, and scored 30 goals, and 64 assists with the Vancouver Voodoo, and Orlando Jackals. Dumas also had a 13 season minor league career, and was drafted in the 9th round (180th overall) of the 1987 NHL entry draft by the St. Louis Blues. Dumas is currently the general manager for the CDA Hockey Academy in Coeur D'Alene, Idaho.

== Rollerhockey statistics ==
			Regular season					Playoffs
Season	Team	League	GP	G	A	Pts	PIM	GP	G	A	Pts	PIM
1994	Vancouver Voodoo	RHI	14	10	19	29	26	—	—	—	—	—
1995	Vancouver Voodoo	RHI	23	11	20	31	72	—	—	—	—	—
1996	Vancouver Voodoo	RHI	27	6	22	28	40	—	—	—	—	—
1997	Orlando Jackals	RHI	7	3	3	6	20	—	—	—	—	—
RHI totals			71	30	64	94	158	—	—	—	—	—

== Ice hockey statistics ==
			Regular season					Playoffs
Season	Team	League	GP	G	A	Pts	PIM	GP	G	A	Pts	PIM
1984–85	Seattle Breakers	WHL	38	0	0	0	26	—	—	—	—	—
1985–86	Seattle Thunderbirds	WHL	68	4	11	15	124	5	0	0	0	24
1986–87	Seattle Thunderbirds	WHL	72	8	29	37	259	—	—	—	—	—
1987–88	Seattle Thunderbirds	WHL	67	12	25	37	218	—	—	—	—	—
1988–89	Seattle Thunderbirds	WHL	70	10	27	37	161	—	—	—	—	—
1988–89	Peoria Rivermen	IHL	10	0	0	0	51	4	0	0	0	23
1989–90	Spokane Chiefs	WHL	57	8	23	31	134	6	1	1	2	17
1990–91	Greensboro Monarchs	ECHL	64	4	29	33	201	13	2	0	2	32
1991–92	Nashville Knights	ECHL	63	9	27	36	215	—	—	—	—	—
1992–93	Milwaukee Admirals	IHL	1	0	0	0	0	—	—	—	—	—
1992–93	Nashville Knights	ECHL	63	13	45	58	191	9	2	0	2	37
1993–94	Milwaukee Admirals	IHL	8	0	0	0	16	—	—	—	—	—
1993–94	Nashville Knights	ECHL	52	11	36	47	203	2	1	0	1	2
1994–95	Knoxville Cherokees	ECHL	22	3	8	11	47	—	—	—	—	—
1994–95	Tallahassee Tiger Sharks	ECHL	35	8	27	35	68	13	4	3	7	40
1995–96	Milton Keynes Kings	BHL	32	14	30	44	113	6	7	8	15	14
1995–96	Billingham Bombers	NIHL	7	4	5	9	55	—	—	—	—	—
1996–97	Tallahassee Tiger Sharks	ECHL	63	17	33	50	118	3	1	0	1	5
1997–98	Cleveland Lumberjacks	IHL	2	0	1	1	2	—	—	—	—	—
1997–98	Idaho Steelheads	WCHL	62	10	38	48	93	4	0	1	1	0
1998–99	Idaho Steelheads	WCHL	64	19	38	57	137	2	0	1	1	0
1999–00	Idaho Steelheads	WCHL	61	7	26	33	86	3	1	1	2	0
2000–01	Idaho Steelheads	WCHL	2	0	0	0	2	—	—	—	—	—
2000–01	Tacoma Sabercats	WCHL	57	3	8	11	87	5	0	1	1	16
2001–02	Fresno Falcons	WCHL	2	1	1	2	2	—	—	—	—	—
ECHL totals			362	65	205	270	1,043	40	9	4	13	116
