= Jim Sprott (ice hockey) =

Canadian ice hockey player

- Born: April 11, 1969 (age 56) Oakville, Ontario, Canada
- Height: 6 ft 1 in (185 cm)
- Weight: 194 lb (88 kg; 13 st 12 lb)
- Position: Defense
- Shot: Left
- Played for: Halifax Citadels; Peoria Rivermen; Fort Wayne Komets; Greensboro Monarchs; New Haven Nighthawks; St. John's Maple Leafs; Brantford Smoke; South Carolina Stingrays; San Antonio Iguanas; Shreveport Mudbugs
- NHL draft: 51st overall, 1987; Quebec Nordiques
- Playing career: 1989–2007

James "Jim" Sprott (born April 11, 1969) is a Canadian former professional ice hockey defenceman.

== Early life ==
Sprott was born in Oakville, Ontario. He played major junior hockey with the London Knights of the Ontario Hockey League.

== Career ==
Sprott was drafted 51st overall in the 3rd round by the Quebec Nordiques. He later played 16 seasons in the minor leagues before retiring as a professional player following the 2006–07 season.

== Career statistics ==
| | | | Regular season | | | | | Playoffs |
| Season | Team | League | GP | G | A | Pts | PIM | GP | G | A | Pts | PIM |
|---|---|---|---|---|---|---|---|---|---|---|---|---|
| 1986–87 | London Knights | OHL | 66 | 8 | 30 | 38 | 153 | — | — | — | — | — |
| 1987–88 | London Knights | OHL | 65 | 8 | 23 | 31 | 216 | 12 | 1 | 6 | 7 | 8 |
| 1988–89 | London Knights | OHL | 64 | 15 | 42 | 57 | 236 | 21 | 4 | 17 | 21 | 68 |
| 1989–90 | Halifax Citadels | AHL | 22 | 2 | 1 | 3 | 103 | — | — | — | — | — |
| 1990–91 | Halifax Citadels | AHL | 9 | 0 | 2 | 2 | 17 | — | — | — | — | — |
| 1990–91 | Peoria Rivermen | IHL | 31 | 2 | 5 | 7 | 92 | — | — | — | — | — |
| 1990–91 | Fort Wayne Komets | IHL | 19 | 0 | 1 | 1 | 67 | — | — | — | — | — |
| 1990–91 | Greensboro Monarchs | ECHL | 3 | 0 | 0 | 0 | 31 | — | — | — | — | — |
| 1991–92 | New Haven Nighthawks | AHL | 54 | 4 | 11 | 15 | 140 | 3 | 0 | 0 | 0 | 17 |
| 1992–93 | Halifax Citadels | AHL | 77 | 6 | 21 | 27 | 180 | — | — | — | — | — |
| 1993–94 | St. John's Maple Leafs | AHL | 9 | 1 | 0 | 1 | 35 | — | — | — | — | — |
| 1993–94 | Brantford Smoke | CoHL | 12 | 1 | 3 | 4 | 55 | — | — | — | — | — |
| 1993–94 | South Carolina Stingrays | ECHL | 46 | 8 | 25 | 33 | 221 | 3 | 0 | 0 | 0 | 8 |
| 1994–95 | South Carolina Stingrays | ECHL | 21 | 1 | 6 | 7 | 100 | — | — | — | — | — |
| 1995–96 | South Carolina Stingrays | ECHL | 2 | 0 | 0 | 0 | 24 | — | — | — | — | — |
| 1995–96 | San Antonio Iguanas | CHL | 51 | 11 | 33 | 44 | 220 | 13 | 2 | 8 | 10 | 51 |
| 1996–97 | San Antonio Iguanas | CHL | 64 | 15 | 42 | 57 | 209 | — | — | — | — | — |
| 1997–98 | Shreveport Mudbugs | WPHL | 66 | 8 | 21 | 29 | 241 | 8 | 1 | 4 | 5 | 31 |
| 1998–99 | Shreveport Mudbugs | WPHL | 59 | 13 | 34 | 47 | 228 | 12 | 2 | 6 | 8 | 41 |
| 1999–00 | Shreveport Mudbugs | WPHL | 67 | 22 | 26 | 48 | 152 | 14 | 5 | 8 | 13 | 42 |
| 2000–01 | Bossier-Shreveport Mudbugs | WPHL | 57 | 6 | 24 | 30 | 205 | 14 | 2 | 3 | 5 | 31 |
| 2001–02 | Bossier-Shreveport Mudbugs | CHL | 54 | 8 | 18 | 26 | 169 | — | — | — | — | — |
| 2002–03 | Bossier-Shreveport Mudbugs | CHL | 63 | 13 | 9 | 22 | 142 | — | — | — | — | — |
| 2003–04 | Bossier-Shreveport Mudbugs | CHL | 61 | 7 | 16 | 23 | 188 | 17 | 3 | 6 | 9 | 2 |
| 2006–07 | Bossier-Shreveport Mudbugs | CHL | 2 | 0 | 0 | 0 | 10 | — | — | — | — | — |
| AHL totals | | | 171 | 13 | 35 | 48 | 475 | 3 | 0 | 0 | 0 | 17 |
| ECHL totals | | | 72 | 9 | 31 | 40 | 376 | 3 | 0 | 0 | 0 | 8 |
| CHL totals | | | 295 | 54 | 118 | 172 | 938 | 30 | 5 | 14 | 19 | 53 |
| WPHL totals | | | 249 | 49 | 105 | 154 | 826 | 48 | 10 | 21 | 31 | 145 |
