= Tomaz Eriksson =

Swedish ice hockey player

- Born: March 23, 1967 (age 59) Stockholm, Sweden
- Height: 6 ft 0 in (183 cm)
- Weight: 187 lb (85 kg; 13 st 5 lb)
- Position: Left wing
- Shot: Left
- Played for: Djurgårdens IF; Södertälje SK
- NHL draft: 83rd overall, 1987; Philadelphia Flyers
- Playing career: 1986–1999

Tomaz Feuk Eriksson (born March 23, 1967) is a former Swedish professional ice hockey player who played in the Swedish Hockey League (SHL). Eriksson was drafted in the fourth round of the 1987 NHL entry draft by the Philadelphia Flyers, but he never played professionally in North America. He spent his entire professional career in Sweden, playing six seasons in the SHL with the Djurgårdens IF and Södertälje SK.
