= Nick Fotiu =

American ice hockey player (born 1952)

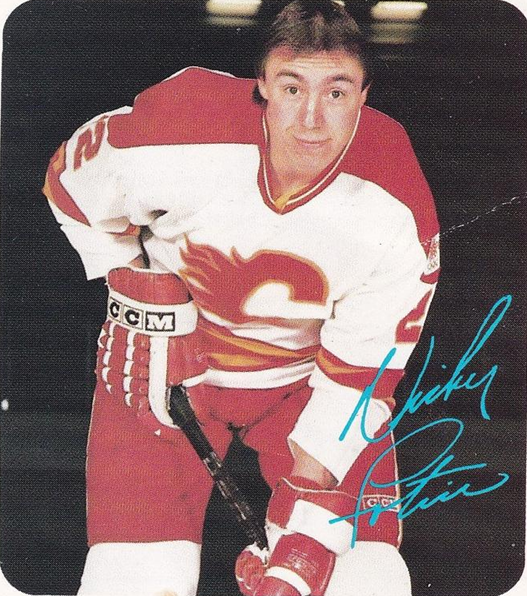
- Fotiu in 1986 card
- Born: May 25, 1952 (age 74) Staten Island, New York, U.S.
- Height: 6 ft 2 in (188 cm)
- Weight: 210 lb (95 kg; 15 st 0 lb)
- Position: Forward
- Shot: Left
- Played for: New England Whalers; New York Rangers; Hartford Whalers; Calgary Flames; Philadelphia Flyers; Edmonton Oilers
- NHL draft: Undrafted
- Playing career: 1973–1990

Nicholas Evlampios Fotiu (born May 25, 1952) is an American former professional ice hockey forward. He played in the World Hockey Association and National Hockey League (NHL) between 1974 and 1988.

== Playing career ==
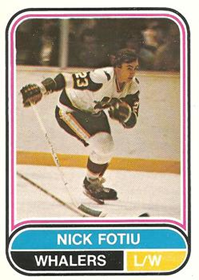
1975 card of Fotiu for the New England Whalers in the WHA

Fotiu's father was of Greek descent, while his mother was of Italian descent. A left winger, Fotiu began his career in the World Hockey Association (WHA) with the New England Whalers in the 1974–75 season. Two years later, he signed with his hometown New York Rangers of the National Hockey League (NHL), where his role as an enforcer endeared him to Ranger fans. He was loved for his fighting style, which he picked up as a golden-gloves boxer, and he was the first New York City-born Ranger. Fotiu's popularity as a Ranger was enhanced by his willingness to throw pucks up into the Madison Square Garden "blue seats" after pre-game warmups, where previously he sat as a young fan. These seats were the least expensive and farthest seats from the action, far beyond where pucks would normally land during gameplay. Fotiu played with the Rangers until 1979, when he was claimed by the renamed Hartford Whalers in the 1979 NHL Expansion Draft.

Fotiu's second tour with the Whalers ended when he was traded back to the Rangers during the middle of the 1980–81 NHL season, where he remained for five seasons. He was traded to the Calgary Flames in 1986 and helped them get to their first Stanley Cup final appearance. Fotiu also played for the Philadelphia Flyers and briefly with the Edmonton Oilers before retiring from professional play in 1990.

== Post-playing career ==
After retiring, Fotiu moved into coaching and was most recently an assistant coach of the Hartford Wolf Pack. Fotiu runs a construction business and a charitable foundation, in addition to doing public relations for the Rangers.

Nick Fotiu has been inducted into the Staten Island Sports Hall of Fame. He is the first native of New York City to play for the New York Rangers.

== Legacy ==
In the 2009 book 100 Ranger Greats, the authors ranked Fotiu at No. 100 all-time of the 901 New York Rangers who had played during the team's first 82 seasons.

== Career statistics ==
=== Regular season and playoffs ===
			Regular season					Playoffs
Season	Team	League	GP	G	A	Pts	PIM	GP	G	A	Pts	PIM
1971–72	New Hyde Park Arrows	NYJHL	32	6	17	23	135	5	4	4	8	14
1972–73	New Hyde Park Arrows	NYJHL	—	—	—	—	—	—	—	—	—	—
1973–74	Cape Cod Cubs	NAHL	72	12	24	36	371	13	4	7	11	80
1974–75	New England Whalers	WHA	61	2	2	4	144	4	2	0	2	27
1974–75	Cape Codders	NAHL	5	2	1	3	13	—	—	—	—	—
1975–76	New England Whalers	WHA	49	3	2	5	94	16	3	2	5	57
1975–76	Cape Codders	NAHL	6	2	1	3	15	—	—	—	—	—
1976–77	New York Rangers	NHL	70	4	8	12	174	—	—	—	—	—
1977–78	New York Rangers	NHL	59	2	7	9	105	3	0	0	0	5
1977–78	New Haven Nighthawks	AHL	5	1	1	2	9	—	—	—	—	—
1978–79	New York Rangers	NHL	71	3	5	8	190	4	0	0	0	6
1979–80	Hartford Whalers	NHL	74	10	8	18	107	3	0	0	0	6
1980–81	Hartford Whalers	NHL	42	4	3	7	79	—	—	—	—	—
1980–81	New York Rangers	NHL	27	5	6	11	91	2	0	0	0	4
1981–82	New York Rangers	NHL	70	8	10	18	151	10	0	2	2	6
1982–83	New York Rangers	NHL	72	8	13	21	90	5	0	1	1	6
1983–84	New York Rangers	NHL	40	7	6	13	115	—	—	—	—	—
1984–85	New York Rangers	NHL	46	4	7	11	54	—	—	—	—	—
1985–86	New Haven Nighthawks	AHL	9	4	2	6	21	—	—	—	—	—
1985–86	Calgary Flames	NHL	9	0	1	1	21	11	0	1	1	34
1986–87	Calgary Flames	NHL	42	5	3	8	145	—	—	—	—	—
1987–88	Philadelphia Flyers	NHL	23	0	0	0	40	—	—	—	—	—
1988–89	Edmonton Oilers	NHL	1	0	0	0	0	—	—	—	—	—
1989–90	New Haven Nighthawks	AHL	31	0	3	3	40	—	—	—	—	—
WHA totals			110	5	4	9	238	20	5	2	7	84
NHL totals			646	60	77	137	1362	38	0	4	4	67

Preceded by Ed Johnstone	Head coaches of the Johnstown Chiefs; 1995-1997	Succeeded by Scott Allen
