= Reg Kent =

Canadian ice hockey player

- Born: October 24, 1944 (age 81) Willingdon, Alberta, Canada
- Height: 6 ft 2 in (188 cm)
- Weight: 190 lb (86 kg; 13 st 8 lb)
- Position: Centre
- Shot: Right
- Played for: Johnstown Jets
- NHL draft: undrafted
- Playing career: 1965–1975

Reg Kent (born Reginald Tashuck, October 24, 1944) is a Canadian retired professional ice hockey player who spent his career with the Johnstown Jets of the Eastern Hockey League and North American Hockey League. Other than brief stints with the Memphis Wings of the Central Professional Hockey League and the Seattle Totems of the Western Hockey League (totaling eight games), he spent his entire career with the Jets.

Kent was born in Willingdon, Alberta. After four games with Memphis in the 1965–66 season to start his career, he moved in the same season to Johnstown, and finished with 27 goals and 43 assists to be the runner-up for Rookie of the Year honors. His best seasons were between 1968 and 1970. In the 1968 season, he had 38 goals and a league record 106 assists for 144 points in only 63 games, finishing in second place to Don Davidson in league scoring; he was also named to the league's First All-Star Team. The following season, he scored 42 goals and 96 assists for 138 points, winning the John Carlin Trophy as league leading scorer, and once again being named to the First All-Star Team.

Kent's final professional season was 1974, after the Eastern Hockey League folded; the Jets moved to the NAHL, and he scored 86 points to lead the squad. He played one final season of senior amateur hockey with the Spokane Flyers of the Western Independent Hockey League, before retiring at the age of 29.

He finished his career with the Jets having scored 248 goals and 480 assists for 728 points in 528 games; his totals in the above are second in franchise history to Dick Roberge. His totals were good enough to be 27th in all-time goals for the EHL, 12th in all-time assists, and 16th in all-time points.
