= Tallahassee Tide =

Tallahassee Tide
Founded	2002
Home ice	(proposed) Tallahassee-Leon County Civic Center
Based in	Tallahassee, Florida
Colors	Navy Blue, Teal, Red, White
League	Atlantic Coast Hockey League
Head coach	Darryl Noren
VP of Business Operations	Tom Whited
Owner	Bill Coffey

The Tallahassee Tide were a proposed ice hockey team in the Atlantic Coast Hockey League. The team's proposed home rink was the Tallahassee-Leon County Civic Center.

== Formation ==
On March 29, 2002, Bill Coffey said that the chances of hockey returning to Tallahassee was somewhere between "100 and 110%." The ACHL officially announce their formation on April 9. David Adams was announced as the investor looking to bring a team to Tallahassee. As early as April 25, a lease deal was close to completion, but on May 1, Adams backed out of owning the Tallahassee franchise to instead be a part investor in the Orlando Seals. Coffey said the team would look local investors and that it would not hinder hockey's return. On May 30, 2002, the Tallahassee Democrat published a story saying that the lease deal would likely be done within the week, and it also mentioned that the Tallahassee franchise was now owned by Coffey.

One June 13, a story was published that citied the lack of office space for the team as the key bump in the road that was keeping a lease deal from being completed. Later that month, a story was published saying that the team would have a lease done in mid July. The office space was available, but Coffey decided to wait to sign and announce the lease until he announced the staff, colors, name, and logo.

Despite the press saying a lease deal was imminent, a deal still had not closed by August 8, when the Tallahassee Democrat ran a story that explained that Coffey was concerned with the amount of practice time the team would get and the dates of the home games. It also mentioned that the Civic Center had made a good faith move to allow the Tide to move into the office even without a lease.

== Demise ==
On August 10, 2002, the Tallahassee Democrat ran a story stating that the Civic Center's director had grown tired of waiting for Coffey to sign a lease deal, and he had issued a scathing ultimatum saying that the Tide had until Wednesday (Aug. 14) at 5 PM to sign a lease deal. Coffey said he was still concerned with the dates available.

On August 14, when a lease had not been signed, the ACHL announced the six teams for its inaugural season, and Tallahassee wasn't on the list. Coffey said that lack of support was not the reason Tallahassee didn't get a team and that the issue was arena availability for practice time and game dates.
