= Luke Curtin =

American ice hockey player (born 1977)

- Born: September 23, 1977 (age 48) Saint Paul, Minnesota, U.S.
- Height: 6 ft 2 in (188 cm)
- Weight: 209 lb (95 kg; 14 st 13 lb)
- Position: Left wing
- Shot: Left
- Played for: Hershey Bears; Grand Rapids Griffins; Portland Pirates; Baton Rouge Kingfish; Long Beach Ice Dogs; Milwaukee Admirals; Tacoma Sabercats; Providence Bruins; Atlantic City Boardwalk Bullies; Bridgeport Sound Tigers; San Antonio Rampage; Fresno Falcons
- NHL draft: 134th overall, 1996; Colorado Avalanche
- Playing career: 1998–2008

Luke Curtin (born September 23, 1977) is an American former professional ice hockey player. He was selected by the Colorado Avalanche in the 4th round (134th overall) of the 1996 NHL entry draft. Curtin predominantly played in the ECHL and in November 2010, he was named to the 12-man ECHL All-Decade Team, which honored the best ECHL players from 2000–01 through the 2009–10 ECHL season. In 2011 Curtin was inducted into the ECHL Hall of Fame.

== Career statistics ==
			Regular season					Playoffs
Season	Team	League	GP	G	A	Pts	PIM	GP	G	A	Pts	PIM
1994–95	Tacoma Rockets	WHL	1	0	0	0	0	4	1	1	2	2
1995–96	Kelowna Rockets	WHL	69	21	26	47	39	6	3	2	5	6
1996–97	Kelowna Rockets	WHL	47	23	37	60	36	6	3	3	6	4
1997–98	Kelowna Rockets	WHL	51	29	48	77	42	7	4	7	11	4
1997–98	Hershey Bears	AHL	2	0	0	0	2	—	—	—	—	—
1998–99	Grand Rapids Griffins	IHL	4	0	0	0	2	—	—	—	—	—
1998–99	Portland Pirates	AHL	4	0	1	1	4	—	—	—	—	—
1998–99	Baton Rouge Kingfish	ECHL	56	28	29	57	32	6	3	4	7	4
1999–00	Baton Rouge Kingfish	ECHL	61	32	43	75	36	2	1	1	2	0
1999–00	Long Beach Ice Dogs	IHL	11	4	1	5	8	—	—	—	—	—
1999–00	Milwaukee Admirals	IHL	1	0	0	0	0	1	0	0	0	0
2000–01	Tacoma Sabercats	WCHL	54	23	32	55	98	5	2	3	5	4
2001–02	Atlantic City Boardwalk Bullies	ECHL	63	27	45	72	106	12	6	9	15	18
2001–02	Providence Bruins	AHL	2	0	0	0	0	—	—	—	—	—
2002–03	Atlantic City Boardwalk Bullies	ECHL	40	11	34	45	32	19	2	18	20	20
2003–04	Atlantic City Boardwalk Bullies	ECHL	64	33	45	78	82	—	—	—	—	—
2003–04	Bridgeport Sound Tigers	AHL	10	1	5	6	6	7	0	3	3	6
2004–05	Atlantic City Boardwalk Bullies	ECHL	38	9	31	40	18	—	—	—	—	—
2004–05	San Antonio Rampage	AHL	5	0	2	2	4	—	—	—	—	—
2005–06	Fresno Falcons	ECHL	64	21	61	82	60	15	2	14	16	14
2006–07	Fresno Falcons	ECHL	55	20	54	74	47	6	2	9	11	4
2007–08	Fresno Falcons	ECHL	60	12	42	54	32	6	1	3	4	2
ECHL totals			501	193	384	577	445	66	17	58	75	62
AHL totals			23	1	8	9	16	7	0	3	3	6

== Awards and honors ==
Award	Year
ECHL
First All-Star Team	2003–04
First All-Star Team	2005–06
