= John Brophy Award =

- Sport: Ice hockey
- Awarded for: to the ECHL coach adjudged to have contributed the most to his team's success.

History
- First award: 1989 (renamed in 2003)
- Most recent: Bruce Ramsay (Wichita Thunder)

The John Brophy Award goes to the ECHL coach judged to have contributed the most to his team's success as voted by the coaches of each of the ECHL teams. The John Brophy Award has been awarded since 1989. The award is named after John Brophy, who coached in the league for 13 seasons and won 575 regular and postseason games, an ECHL record. The award, founded in 1989 and originally named Coach Of The Year, was renamed in his honor in 2003.

Bob Ferguson is the only multiple winner of the award, having won it in 1999 and 2000.

== Awardees ==
Season	Coach	Team
1988–89	Ron Hansis	Erie Panthers
1989–90	Dave Allison	Virginia Lancers
1990–91	Don Jackson	Knoxville Cherokees
1991–92	Doug Sauter	Winston-Salem Thunderbirds
1992–93	Kurt Kleinendorst	Raleigh IceCaps
1993–94	Barry Smith	Knoxville Cherokees (2)
1994–95	Jim Playfair	Dayton Bombers
1995–96	Roy Sommer	Richmond Renegades
1996–97	Brian McCutcheon	Columbus Chill
1997–98	Chris Nilan	Chesapeake Icebreakers
1998–99	Bob Ferguson	Florida Everblades
1999–00	Bob Ferguson (2)	Florida Everblades (2)
2000–01	Troy Ward	Trenton Titans
2001–02	Dave Farrish	Louisiana IceGators
2002–03	Claude Noel	Toledo Storm
2003–04	Pat Bingham	Wheeling Nailers
2004–05	Nick Vitucci	Toledo Storm (2)
2005–06	Glen Gulutzan	Las Vegas Wranglers
2006–07	Davis Payne	Alaska Aces
2007–08	Chuck Weber	Cincinnati Cyclones
2008–09	Rick Kowalsky	Trenton Devils (2)
2009–10	Derek Laxdal	Idaho Steelheads
2010–11	Brent Thompson	Alaska Aces (2)
2011–12	Rob Murray	Alaska Aces (3)
2011–12	John Wroblewski	Gwinnett Gladiators
2012–13	Jarrod Skalde	Cincinnati Cyclones (2)
2013–14	Spencer Carbery	South Carolina Stingrays
2014–15	Derek Lalonde	Toledo Walleye (3)
2015–16	Richard Matvichuk	Missouri Mavericks
2016–17	Dan Watson	Toledo Walleye (4)
2017–18	Brad Ralph	Florida Everblades (3)
2018–19	Matt Thomas	Cincinnati Cyclones (3)
2019–20	Steve Bergin	South Carolina Stingrays (2)
2020–21	Bruce Ramsay	Wichita Thunder
2021–22	Jeff Pyle	Atlanta Gladiators
2022–23	Everett Sheen	Idaho Steelheads (2)
2023–24	Andrew Lord	Greenville Swamp Rabbits

== See also ==
- ECHL awards
