= 2005 Kelly Cup playoffs =

The 2005 Kelly Cup Playoffs of the ECHL began on April 12, 2005. 16 teams qualified for the playoffs. In the American Conference, the top eight teams qualified for the playoffs. In the National Conference, the top four teams from each division qualified for the playoffs.

The Kelly Cup Final ended on June 1, 2005, with the Trenton Titans defeating the Florida Everblades four games to two to win the first Kelly Cup in team history. Trenton forward Leon Hayward was named the Kelly Cup Playoffs Most Valuable Player.

== Playoff format ==
=== American Conference ===
The top eight teams in the conference qualified for the 2005 Kelly Cup playoffs, with the division champions seeded 1 and 2 and the remaining six teams seeded 3 through 8 based on points. The Conference quarterfinals featured a best-of-5 series with the higher seeds (1, 2, 3 and 4) versus the lower seeds (8, 7, 6 and 5). The Conference semifinals featured a best-of-5 series as well as a reseeding with the highest remaining seeds hosting the lowest remaining seeds. The Conference finals featured a best-of-seven series with the winner crowned the American Conference champion and granted a berth in the Kelly Cup Finals.

=== National Conference ===
The top four teams in each of the North and West divisions qualified for the 2005 Kelly Cup playoffs. Each divisions' champion would be seeded first in the best-of-5 Division Semifinals hosting the fourth seed from their division, while the second seeds would play the third seeds. The winners of each Division semifinal would move on to the best-of-5 division finals. The winners of the two division finals play in a best-of-seven conference final. The winner of the conference final was crowned the National Conference champions and granted a berth in the Kelly Cup Finals

=== Kelly Cup Finals ===
The Kelly Cup Finals will be a best-of-seven series between the two conference champions.

== Playoff Seeds ==
After the 2005–06 ECHL regular season, 19 teams qualified for the playoffs. The Alaska Aces were the National Conference regular season champions, as well the Henry Brabham Cup winners with the best regular season record. The Gwinnett Gladiators were the National Conference regular season champions.

=== American Conference ===
1. Pensacola Ice Pilots – South Division and American Conference champions; Brabham Cup winners, 107 points
2. Columbia Inferno – East Division champions, 88 points
3. Florida Everblades – 94 points
4. Gwinnett Gladiators – 88 points
5. Mississippi Sea Wolves – 87 points
6. South Carolina Stingrays – 87 points
7. Charlotte Checkers – 85 points
8. Greenville Grrrowl – 83 points

=== National Conference ===
==== North Division ====
1. Reading Royals – 93 points
2. Trenton Titans – 93 points
3. Atlantic City Boardwalk Bullies – 92 points
4. Toledo Storm – 87 points

==== West Division ====
1. Alaska Aces – National Conference regular season champions – 98 points
2. Long Beach Ice Dogs – 95 points
3. Idaho Steelheads – 91 points
4. Bakersfield Condors – 90 points

== Playoff Brackets ==
Conference quarterfinals	Conference semifinals
A1	Pensacola	1
A8	Greenville	3
A8	Greenville	0
A3	Florida	3
A3	Florida	3
A6	South Carolina	1
American Conference
A4	Gwinnett	3
A5	Mississippi	1
A4	Gwinnett	1
A7	Charlotte	3
A2	Columbia	2
A7	Charlotte	3
N1	Reading	3
N4	Toledo	1
N1	Reading	1
N2	Trenton	3
N2	Trenton	3
N3	Atlantic City	0
National Conference
W1	Alaska	3
W4	Bakersfield	2
W1	Alaska	3
W2	Long Beach	0
W2	Long Beach	3
W3	Idaho	1

Conference finals
A3	Florida	4
A7	Charlotte	2
N2	Trenton	4
W1	Alaska	3

Kelly Cup finals
A3	Florida	2
N2	Trenton	4

== First round ==
Note 1: All times are local.
Note 2: Game times in italics signify games to be played only if necessary.
Note 3: Home team is listed first.

=== American Conference quarterfinals ===
==== (1) Pensacola Ice Pilots vs. (8) Greenville Grrrowl ====
April 14	Pensacola Ice Pilots	4 – 5	OT	Greenville Grrrowl	Pensacola Civic Center

April 15	Pensacola Ice Pilots	2 – 3	OT	Greenville Grrrowl	Pensacola Civic Center

April 16	Greenville Grrrowl	2 – 3	OT	Pensacola Ice Pilots	BI-LO Center

April 19	Greenville Grrrowl	4 – 0	Pensacola Ice Pilots	BI-LO Center

Greenville wins series 3 – 1

==== (2) Columbia Inferno vs. (7) Charlotte Checkers ====
April 13	Columbia Inferno	2 – 0	Charlotte Checkers	Carolina Coliseum

April 15	Columbia Inferno	4 – 2	Charlotte Checkers	Carolina Coliseum

April 16	Charlotte Checkers	3 – 1	Columbia Inferno	Charlotte Bobcats Arena

April 17	Charlotte Checkers	5 – 2	Columbia Inferno	Charlotte Bobcats Arena

April 20	Columbia Inferno	3 – 4	OT	Charlotte Checkers	Carolina Coliseum

Charlotte wins series 3 – 2

==== (3) Florida Everblades vs. (6) South Carolina Stingrays ====
April 13	Florida Everblades	7 – 4	South Carolina Stingrays	Germain Arena

April 15	Florida Everblades	3 – 4	South Carolina Stingrays	Germain Arena

April 16	South Carolina Stingrays	2 – 5	Florida Everblades	North Charleston Coliseum

April 18	South Carolina Stingrays	3 – 4	OT	Florida Everblades	North Charleston Coliseum

Florida wins series 3 – 1

==== (4) Gwinnett Gladiators vs. (5) Mississippi Sea Wolves ====
April 13	Gwinnett Gladiators	5 – 1	Mississippi Sea Wolves	Arena at Gwinnett Center

April 15	Mississippi Sea Wolves	3 – 2	OT	Gwinnett Gladiators	Mississippi Coast Coliseum

April 16	Gwinnett Gladiators	8 – 1	Mississippi Sea Wolves	Arena at Gwinnett Center

April 18	Gwinnett Gladiators	3 – 1	Mississippi Sea Wolves	Arena at Gwinnett Center

Gwinnett wins series 3 – 1

=== National Conference division semifinals ===
==== (N. 1) Reading Royals vs. (N. 4) Toledo Storm ====
April 14	Reading Royals	0 – 1	Toledo Storm	Sovereign Center

April 16	Reading Royals	1 – 0	Toledo Storm	Sovereign Center

April 17	Toledo Storm	0 – 2	Reading Royals	Toledo Sports Arena

April 19	Toledo Storm	2 – 5	Reading Royals	Toledo Sports Arena

Reading wins series 3 – 1

==== (N. 2) Trenton Titans vs. (N. 3) Atlantic City Boardwalk Bullies ====
April 13	Trenton Titans	4 – 2	Atlantic City Boardwalk Bullies	Sovereign Bank Arena

April 15	Trenton Titans	2 – 1	OT	Atlantic City Boardwalk Bullies	Sovereign Bank Arena

April 17	Atlantic City Boardwalk Bullies	3 – 4	OT	Trenton Titans	Boardwalk Hall

Trenton wins series 3 – 0

==== (W. 1) Alaska Aces vs. (W. 4) Bakersfield Condors ====
April 12	Alaska Aces	5 – 2	Bakersfield Condors	Sullivan Arena

April 13	Alaska Aces	3 – 1	Bakersfield Condors	Sullivan Arena

April 14	Bakersfield Condors	3 – 2	Alaska Aces	Bakersfield Centennial Garden

April 16	Bakersfield Condors	4 – 3	OT	Alaska Aces	Bakersfield Centennial Garden

April 18	Alaska Aces	6 –2	Bakersfield Condors	Sullivan Arena

Alaska wins series 3 – 2

==== (W. 2) Long Beach Ice Dogs vs. (W. 3) Idaho Steelheads ====
April 13	Long Beach Ice Dogs	3 – 2	Idaho Steelheads	Long Beach Sports Arena

April 15	Long Beach Ice Dogs	2 – 3	Idaho Steelheads	Long Beach Sports Arena

April 16	Idaho Steelheads	2 – 4	Long Beach Ice Dogs	Qwest Arena

April 17	Idaho Steelheads	0 – 3	Long Beach Ice Dogs	Qwest Arena

Long Beach wins series 3 – 1

== 2nd Round ==
=== American Conference semifinals ===
==== (3) Florida Everblades vs. (8) Greenville Grrrowl ====
April 22	Florida Everblades	4 – 1	Greenville Grrrowl	Germain Arena

April 25	Florida Everblades	4 – 3	OT	Greenville Grrrowl	Germain Arena

April 26	Greenville Grrrowl	1 – 2	OT	Florida Everblades	BI-LO Center

Florida wins series 3 – 0

==== (4) Gwinnett Gladiators vs. (7) Charlotte Checkers ====
April 24	Gwinnett Gladiators	2 – 1	OT	Charlotte Checkers	Arena at Gwinnett Center

April 25	Gwinnett Gladiators	3 – 4	OT	Charlotte Checkers	Arena at Gwinnett Center

April 27	Charlotte Checkers	4 – 1	Gwinnett Gladiators	Charlotte Bobcats Arena

April 28	Charlotte Checkers	3 – 0	Gwinnett Gladiators	Charlotte Bobcats Arena

Charlotte wins series 3 – 1

=== National Conference division finals ===
==== (N. 1) Reading Royals vs. (N. 2) Trenton Titans ====
April 22	Reading Royals	4 – 2	Trenton Titans	Sovereign Center

April 23	Reading Royals	1 – 2	Trenton Titans	Sovereign Center

April 27	Trenton Titans	3 – 2	OT	Reading Royals	Sovereign Bank Arena

April 29	Trenton Titans	3 – 4	Reading Royals	Sovereign Bank Arena

Trenton wins series 3 – 1

==== (W. 1) Alaska Aces vs. (W. 2) Long Beach Ice Dogs ====
April 22	Long Beach Ice Dogs	1 – 2	OT	Alaska Aces	Long Beach Sports Arena

April 23	Long Beach Ice Dogs	2 – 4	Alaska Aces	Long Beach Sports Arena

April 25	Alaska Aces	3 – 1	Long Beach Ice Dogs	Sullivan Arena

Alaska wins series 3 – 0

== Conference Finals ==
=== American Conference ===
==== (3) Florida Everblades vs. (7) Charlotte Checkers ====
May 2	Florida Everblades	6 – 4	Charlotte Checkers	Germain Arena

May 4	Florida Everblades	4 – 5	Charlotte Checkers	Germain Arena

May 6	Charlotte Checkers	1 – 2	Florida Everblades	Charlotte Bobcats Arena

May 8	Charlotte Checkers	4 – 1	Florida Everblades	Charlotte Bobcats Arena

May 10	Florida Everblades	5 – 0	Charlotte Checkers	Germain Arena

May 13	Charlotte Checkers	0 – 1	OT	Florida Everblades	Charlotte Bobcats Arena

Florida wins series 4 – 2

=== National Conference ===
==== (W. 1) Alaska Aces vs. (N. 2) Trenton Titans ====
May 3	Alaska Aces	6 – 0	Trenton Titans	Sullivan Arena

May 4	Alaska Aces	1 – 7	Trenton Titans	Sullivan Arena

May 7	Trenton Titans	4 – 3	OT	Alaska Aces	Sovereign Bank Arena

May 8	Trenton Titans	3 – 4	OT	Alaska Aces	Sovereign Bank Arena

May 10	Trenton Titans	3 – 0	Alaska Aces	Sovereign Bank Arena

May 13	Alaska Aces	2 – 1	OT	Trenton Titans	Sullivan Arena

May 16	Alaska Aces	0 – 2	Trenton Titans	Sullivan Arena

Trenton wins series 4 – 3

== 2005 Kelly Cup Finals ==
=== (A. 3) Florida Everblades vs. (N. 2) Trenton Titans ===
May 21	Florida Everblades	0 – 7	Trenton Titans	Germain Arena

May 22	Florida Everblades	1 – 2	Trenton Titans	Germain Arena

May 27	Trenton Titans	4 – 5	OT	Florida Everblades	Sovereign Bank Arena

May 28	Trenton Titans	3 – 6	Florida Everblades	Sovereign Bank Arena

May 30	Trenton Titans	5 – 2	Florida Everblades	Sovereign Bank Arena

June 1	Florida Everblades	1 – 4	Trenton Titans	Germain Arena

Trenton wins series 4 – 2

== See also ==
- 2004–05 ECHL season
- List of ECHL seasons

Preceded by 2004 Kelly Cup playoffs	Kelly Cup Playoffs; 2005	Succeeded by 2006 Kelly Cup playoffs
