= Scott Stirling =

American ice hockey player and coach

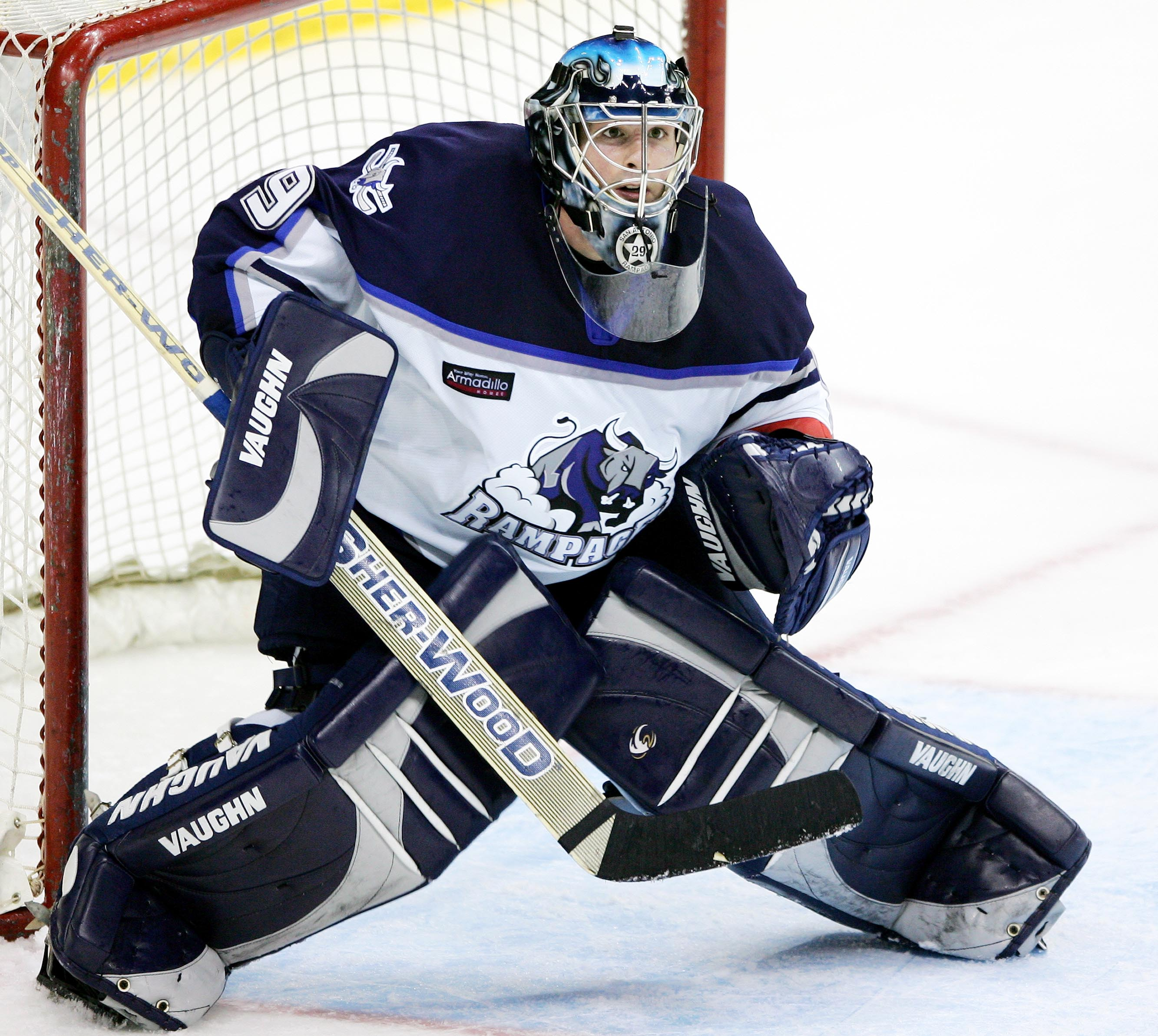
- Stirling with the San Antonio Rampage in 2006
- Born: August 2, 1977 (age 48) Hull, Massachusetts, U.S.
- Height: 6 ft 2 in (188 cm)
- Weight: 205 lb (93 kg; 14 st 9 lb)
- Position: Goaltender
- Caught: Left
- Played for: AHL; Worcester IceCats; Bridgeport Sound Tigers; Portland Pirates; San Antonio Rampage; ECHL; Trenton Titans; Peoria Rivermen; Atlantic City Boardwalk Bullies; Fresno Falcons; UHL; Danbury Trashers
- NHL draft: Undrafted
- Playing career: 2000–2008

Scott Stirling (born August 2, 1977) is an American former professional ice hockey goaltender. He is the head coach of the Gilmour Academy boys prep hockey team in Cleveland, Ohio.

== Playing career ==
Stirling attended Brown University from 1996 to 2000 where he played NCAA Division I college hockey with the Brown Bears men's ice hockey team. Undrafted, Stirling began his professional career in 2000 by joining the Trenton Titans of the ECHL, winning the John A. Daley Trophy as the ECHL Rookie of the Year. He went on to play parts of six seasons in the ECHL, being twice selected the ECHL Goaltender of the Year, and being named the ECHL Most Valuable Player for the 2003–04 season. He also backstopped the Atlantic City Boardwalk Bullies to capture the 2003 Kelly Cup as ECHL Champions. In November 2010, Stirling was named to the ECHL All-Decade Team.

== Personal life ==
His father is Steve Stirling, the long-time NCAA and American Hockey League coach.

== Awards and honors ==
Award	Year
John A. Daley Trophy - ECHL Rookie of the Year	2000–01
ECHL Goaltender of the Year	2000–01
ECHL First All-Star Team	2000–01
ECHL Goaltender of the Year	2003–04
ECHL First All-Star Team	2003–04
ECHL Most Valuable Player	2003–04
