= List of ECHL seasons =

This is a list of seasons of the ECHL since its inception:

| No. | Season | No. of teams | Reg. season games | Start (reg. season) | Finish (reg. season) | Top record | Champion |
|---|---|---|---|---|---|---|---|
| 1 | 1988–89 | 5 | 60 | | April 12 | Erie Panthers (37–20–3) | Carolina Thunderbirds |
| 2 | 1989–90 | 8 | 60 | | | Winston-Salem Thunderbirds (38–16–6) | Greensboro Monarchs |
| 3 | 1990–91 | 11 | 64 | | April 11 | Knoxville Cherokees (46–13–5) | Hampton Roads Admirals |
| 4 | 1991–92 | 15 | 64 | | | Toledo Storm (46–15–3) | Hampton Roads Admirals |
| 5 | 1992–93 | 15 | 64 | | | Wheeling Thunderbirds (40–16–8) | Toledo Storm |
| 6 | 1993–94 | 19 | 68 | | | Knoxville Cherokees (44–18–6) | Toledo Storm |
| 7 | 1994–95 | 18 | 68 | | | Wheeling Thunderbirds (46–17–5) | Richmond Renegades |
| 8 | 1995–96 | 21 | 70 | | | Richmond Renegades (46–11–13) | Charlotte Checkers |
| 9 | 1996–97 | 23 | 70 | | | South Carolina Stingrays (45–15–10) | South Carolina Stingrays |
| 10 | 1997–98 | 25 | 70 | | | Louisiana IceGators (43–17–10) | Hampton Roads Admirals |
| 11 | 1998–99 | 27 | 70 | | | Pee Dee Pride (51–15–4) | Mississippi Sea Wolves |
| 12 | 1999–00 | 28 | 70 | October | May 31 | Florida Everblades (53–15–2) | Peoria Rivermen |
| 13 | 2000–01 | 24 | 72 | | | Trenton Titans (50–18–4) | South Carolina Stingrays |
| 14 | 2001–02 | 29 | 72 | | | Louisiana IceGators (56–12–4) | Greenville Grrrowl |
| 15 | 2002–03 | 27 | 72 | | | Toledo Storm (47–15–10) | Atlantic City Boardwalk Bullies |
| 16 | 2003–04 | 31 | 72 | | | San Diego Gulls (49–13–10) | Idaho Steelheads |
| 17 | 2004–05 | 28 | 72 | | | Pensacola Ice Pilots (51–16–5) | Trenton Titans |
| 18 | 2005–06 | 25 | 72 | October | May | Alaska Aces (53–12–7) | Alaska Aces |
| 19 | 2006–07 | 25 | 72 | October | May | Las Vegas Wranglers (46–12–14) | Idaho Steelheads |
| 20 | 2007–08 | 25 | 72 | October | May | Cincinnati Cyclones (55–12–5) | Cincinnati Cyclones |
| 21 | 2008–09 | 23 | 72 | October 17 | June 5 | Florida Everblades (49–17–5) | South Carolina Stingrays |
| 22 | 2009–10 | 20 | 72 | October 15 | April 3 | Idaho Steelheads (47–17–7) | Cincinnati Cyclones |
| 23 | 2010–11 | 19 | 72 | October 5 | April 2 | Alaska Aces (47–22–3) | Alaska Aces |
| 24 | 2011–12 | 20 | 72 | October 4 | March 31 | Alaska Aces (43–18–11) | Florida Everblades |
| 25 | 2012–13 | 23 | 72 | October 12 | March 30 | Alaska Aces (49–15–8) | Reading Royals |
| 26 | 2013–14 | 22 | 72 | October 18 | April 13 | Alaska Aces (45–19–7) | Alaska Aces |
| 27 | 2014–15 | 27 | 72 | October 16 | April 9 | Toledo Walleye (50–15–7) | Allen Americans |
| 28 | 2015–16 | 28 | 72 | October 17 | April 11 | Missouri Mavericks (52–15–5) | Allen Americans |
| 29 | 2016–17 | 27 | 72 | October 14 | April 9 | Toledo Walleye (51–17–4) | Colorado Eagles |
| 30 | 2017–18 | 27 | 72 | October 13 | June 9 | Florida Everblades (53–13–6) | Colorado Eagles |
| 31 | 2018–19 | 27 | 72 | October 12 | April 7 | Cincinnati Cyclones (51–13–8) | Newfoundland Growlers |
| 32 | 2019–20 | 26 | 59–64 (Note: Season ended short due to COVID-19 pandemic.) | October 11 | March 11 | Not awarded | |
| 33 | 2020–21 | 27 | 51–72 (Note: Due to COVID-19 pandemic, not all teams played all 72 games.) | December 11 | June 6 | Florida Everblades (42–19–8) | Fort Wayne Komets |
| 34 | 2021–22 | 27 | 67–72 | October 21 | April 17 | Toledo Walleye (49–19–4) | Florida Everblades |
| 35 | 2022–23 | 28 | 72 | October 21 | April 16 | Idaho Steelheads (58-11-3) | Florida Everblades |
| 36 | 2023–24 | 28 (Note: The league terminated the Newfoundland Growlers franchise by league bylaws on April 2, 2024, after the St. John's-based team's owners could not finalize the sale of the team (the Trois-Rivières Lions were sold, however, and they also owned the Lions). Therefore, the total number of teams by season's end was 27.) | 72 | October 19 | April 14 | Kansas City Mavericks (54–12–6) | Florida Everblades |
| 37 | 2024–25 | 29 | 72 | October 18 | April 13 | South Carolina Stingrays (52–15–5) | Trois-Rivières Lions |
| 38 | 2025–26 | 30 | 72 | October 17 | April 19 | Kansas City Mavericks (55–12–5) | Florida Everblades |
