= Mike Haviland =

American ice hockey player and coach

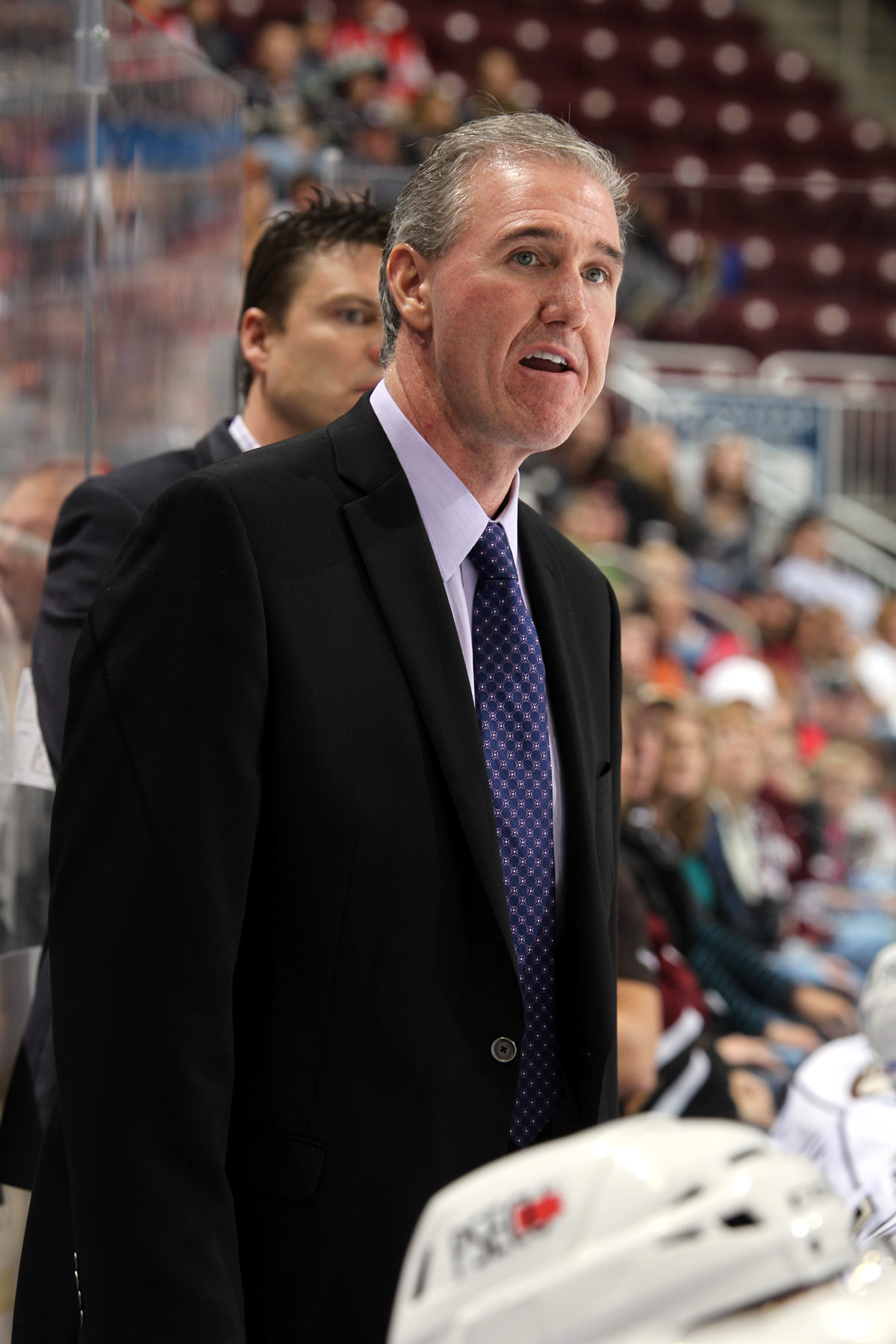
- Haviland in 2013

Biographical details
- Born: July 24, 1967 (age 59); Middletown, New Jersey, U.S.

Playing career
- 1986–1990: Elmira College
- 1989–1990: Binghamton Whalers
- 1990–1991: Richmond Renegades
- 1990–1991: Winston-Salem Thunderbirds
- Position: Forward

Coaching career (HC unless noted)
- 1999–2001: Trenton Titans (assistant)
- 2001–2004: Atlantic City Boardwalk Bullies
- 2004–2005: Trenton Titans
- 2005–2007: Norfolk Admirals
- 2007–2008: Rockford Ice Hogs
- 2008–2012: Chicago Blackhawks (assistant)
- 2012–2013: Norfolk Admirals (associate)
- 2013–2014: Hershey Bears
- 2014–2021: Colorado College

Head coaching record
- Overall: 67–153–22 (.322) [College]

Accomplishments and honors

Championships
- 2003 Kelly Cup; 2005 Kelly Cup; 2010 Stanley Cup (assistant)

Awards
- 2007 Louis A. R. Pieri Memorial Award

Mike Haviland (born July 24, 1967) is the former head coach for the Colorado College Tigers of the NCHC from 2014 to 2021. Previously he was head coach of the Hershey Bears of the American Hockey League. Previously, he was an assistant coach for the Chicago Blackhawks of the National Hockey League from 2008–2012, where he won the Stanley Cup in 2010.

Haviland was named the American Hockey League's Coach of Year, winning the Louis A. R. Pieri Memorial Award for the 2006–07 AHL season, while serving as head coach of the Norfolk Admirals.

On June 18, 2013 it was announced that Haviland would take over as head coach of the Bears, replacing Mark French.

On May 9, 2014 Haviland was named Head Coach of the Colorado College Tigers replacing Scott Owens.

On August 8, 2024 Haviland was named Assistant Coach of the Columbus Blue Jackets.

== Head coaching record ==
Record table
Season	Team	Overall	Conference	Standing	Postseason
Colorado College Tigers (NCHC) (2014–2021)
2014–15	Colorado College	6–26–3	2–19–3–1	8th	NCHC First Round
2015–16	Colorado College	6–29–1	4–19–1–0	8th	NCHC Quarterfinals
2016–17	Colorado College	8–24–4	4–16–4	8th	NCHC Quarterfinals
2017–18	Colorado College	15–17–5	8–12–4	t-5th	NCHC Quarterfinals
2018–19	Colorado College	17–20–4	9–12–3–0	6th	NCHC Third Place Game (Loss)
2019–20	Colorado College	11–20–3	4–17–3–1	8th	Tournament Cancelled
2020–21	Colorado College	4–17–2	4–16–2	7th	NCHC Quarterfinals
Colorado College:		67–153–22	35–111–21		
Total:		67–153–22			
National champion Postseason invitational champion Conference regular season champion Conference regular season and conference tournament champion Division regular season champion Division regular season and conference tournament champion Conference tournament champion

Sporting positions
Preceded by Mark French	Head coach of the Hershey Bears; 2013	Succeeded by Troy Mann
