= Vince Williams (ice hockey) =

Canadian ice hockey player and scout

- Born: November 27, 1975 (age 50) Ottawa, Ontario, Canada
- Height: 6 ft 0 in (183 cm)
- Weight: 201 lb (91 kg; 14 st 5 lb)
- Position: Defence
- Shot: Right
- Played for: Lowell Lock Monsters
- Playing career: 1999–2006

Vince Williams (born November 27, 1975) is a former ice hockey defenseman and a current scout with the expansion Vegas Golden Knights. He was previously the head coach of the Orlando Solar Bears of the ECHL from 2013-2015 and the Trenton Titans from 2011-2013.

== Playing career ==
Williams attended Concordia University until 1998, where he played on their ice hockey team for two seasons where he recorded 25 points.

When he left college, Williams was signed by the Indianapolis Ice formerly of the IHL. After 33 games with Indianapolis, Williams was signed by the Columbus Chill of the ECHL where he tallied 13 points in 43 games. In 1999-2000, Williams was acquired by the Trenton Titans and played in 1 game for the AHL's Lowell Lock Monsters, the furthest he's progress professionally. Williams split time with Trenton and the Orlando Solar Bears formerly of the IHL.

In 2001-2002 Williams once again changed teams, heading to the Florida Everblades of the ECHL where he exploded for a career high 22 points in 70 games. The next season, Williams was traded back to the Titans. In the final three seasons of his playing career, Williams' offensive numbers decreased and his penalty minutes increased dramatically, as he took on more of a leadership role for the Titans. The team's efforts culminated in a Kelly Cup victory in 2004–05 ECHL season. Vince Williams proceeded to retire following the 2005–06 ECHL season.

== Coaching career ==
After a season away from the sport, Vince Williams returned as assistant coach of the new Trenton Devils organization, who were directly affiliated with the Albany Devils of the AHL and New Jersey Devils of the NHL. The Trenton Devils went on to miss the playoffs 3 of the 4 seasons of their existence, and the team folded after the 2010–11 ECHL season.

Late in the summer of 2011, the Trenton Titans were brought back with an independent ownership led by Blue Line Sports LLC and Rich Lisk, who became the team's general manager, president, and CEO. Lisk brought Vince Williams back behind the bench, but in a higher capacity. Williams was named head coach of the Trenton Titans on August 1, 2011.

Now he coaches at the Igloo Ice Rink in Mt laurel NJ, and he also coaches at hockey clinics for Be A Pro Hockey.https://beaprohockey.com/
