= Tom Nemeth =

Canadian ice hockey player

- Born: January 16, 1971 (age 55) St. Catharines, Ontario, Canada
- Height: 6 ft 2 in (188 cm)
- Weight: 200 lb (91 kg; 14 st 4 lb)
- Position: Defence
- Shot: Left
- Played for: IHL; Kalamazoo Wings; Fort Wayne Komets; Cincinnati Cyclones; AHL; Rochester Americans; ECHL; Dayton Bombers; South Carolina Stingrays; Toledo Storm; UHL; Columbus Stars; Fort Wayne Komets
- NHL draft: 206th overall, 1991; Minnesota North Stars
- Playing career: 1992–2005

Tom Nemeth (born January 16, 1971) is a Canadian former professional ice hockey defenceman. He was selected by the Minnesota North Stars in the 10th round (206th overall) of the 1991 NHL entry draft.

Prior to turning professional, Nemeth played major junior hockey with the Cornwall Royals in the Ontario Hockey League. He went on to play 12 seasons of professional hockey, including parts of 11 seasons in the ECHL, where he was selected three times as the ECHL Defenceman of the Year. In 2003, Nemeth was named to the ECHL 15th Anniversary First Team, and in 2009 Nemeth was inducted into the ECHL Hall of Fame.

== Records ==
During the 1993–94 regular season, Nemeth registered 16 goals and 82 assists to set the ECHL record for most assists (82) and most points (98) by a defenceman.

On April 3, 1997, Nemeth, then of the Dayton Bombers, and Andrew Shier and Scott Burfoot of the Richmond Renegades, each scored a goal within 37 seconds to set the ECHL record for the fastest three playoff goals by two teams.

== Career statistics ==
			Regular season					Playoffs
Season	Team	League	GP	G	A	Pts	PIM	GP	G	A	Pts	PIM
1987–88	St. Catharines Falcons	GHL	42	9	24	33	28	—	—	—	—	—
1988–89	Cornwall Royals	OHL	51	4	23	27	25	18	1	1	2	2
1989–90	Cornwall Royals	OHL	41	12	15	27	14	6	0	2	2	0
1990–91	Cornwall Royals	OHL	65	17	43	60	46	—	—	—	—	—
1991–92	Cornwall Royals	OHL	66	25	49	74	33	6	3	2	5	4
1992–93	Dayton Bombers	ECHL	26	9	28	37	14	—	—	—	—	—
1992–93	Kalamazoo Wings	IHL	48	6	13	19	24	—	—	—	—	—
1993–94	Dayton Bombers	ECHL	66	16	82	98	91	3	1	1	2	6
1994–95	South Carolina Stingrays	ECHL	5	3	3	6	2	—	—	—	—	—
1994–95	Rochester Americans	AHL	56	4	17	21	32	4	2	1	3	2
1996–97	Dayton Bombers	ECHL	23	4	19	23	15	4	2	1	3	2
1997–98	Rochester Americans	AHL	11	0	3	3	6	—	—	—	—	—
1997–98	Fort Wayne Komets	IHL	24	3	3	6	12	—	—	—	—	—
1997–98	Dayton Bombers	ECHL	31	8	24	32	19	—	—	—	—	—
1998–99	Dayton Bombers	ECHL	43	13	23	36	28	—	—	—	—	—
1998–99	Cincinnati Cyclones	IHL	36	9	6	15	16	3	0	0	0	4
1999–00	Cincinnati Cyclones	IHL	2	0	3	3	2	9	0	3	3	0
1999–00	Dayton Bombers	ECHL	66	21	56	77	79	3	1	2	3	0
2000–01	Dayton Bombers	ECHL	72	20	48	68	87	8	2	3	5	6
2001–02	Dayton Bombers	ECHL	48	14	24	38	59	14	4	9	13	20
2002–03	Dayton Bombers	ECHL	65	9	30	39	57	—	—	—	—	—
2003–04	Columbus Stars	UHL	34	3	12	15	6	—	—	—	—	—
2003–04	Toledo Storm	ECHL	28	1	9	10	4	—	—	—	—	—
2004–05	Fort Wayne Komets	UHL	60	8	20	28	32	18	2	1	3	6
ECHL totals			473	118	346	464	455	32	10	16	26	34

== Awards and honours ==
Award	Year
ECHL Defenceman of the Year	1993–94
ECHL First All-Star Team	1993–94
ECHL Defenceman of the Year	1999–2000
ECHL First All-Star Team	1999–2000
ECHL Defenceman of the Year	2000–01
ECHL First All-Star Team	2000–01
ECHL 15th Anniversary First Team	2003
ECHL Hall of Fame (inducted)	2008–09
