= Arkansas RiverBlades =

- City: North Little Rock, Arkansas
- League: East Coast Hockey League
- Operated: 1999–2003
- Home arena: Alltel Arena
- Colors: Red, blue, silver, black, white
- Head coach: Geoff Ward (1999); Ron Handy (1999–2000); Chris Cichocki (2000–2003)

The Arkansas RiverBlades were a professional ice hockey team located in North Little Rock, Arkansas. The RiverBlades were an expansion franchise that entered the East Coast Hockey League for the 1999–2000 season. Their home games were played at the newly opened Alltel Arena.

The team logo was unveiled in February 1998 and the Canadian brothers Dave Berryman and Tim Berryman were granted a lease for Alltel Arena in March. The ECHL franchise was granted in May 1998. The team was originally named the "Arkansas RazorBlades" and adopted a razorback hog as its mascot. The University of Arkansas objected to the name and symbology and pressed the team to finally agree to a name change. In October 1998, a contest was held to establish a new name and "RiverBlades" was chosen. In May 1999, the team selected the slogan "Greatest Game on Ice". Little Rock's minor league baseball team, the Arkansas Travelers, objected to the slogan which is similar to their long standing "Greatest Game on Dirt" slogan.

The RiverBlades played their home opener on October 28, 1999, after moving the date due to construction delays at Alltel Arena. The RiverBlades competed with the cross-town Arkansas GlacierCats who were in their second season. The two teams played on the same nights in many cases and each developed their own fan following. The next year, the GlacierCats folded after only two seasons of play, unable to compete with the RiverBlades and their new arena.

In October 2001, the ECHL approved the sale of Dave Berryman's 51 percent stake of the team to Equity Broadcasting, which also owned the Arkansas Twisters arena football team. During the 2000–01 season, the team hosted the ECHL All-Star game at Alltel Arena.

In the summer of 2002, the Fayetteville Force, a Central Hockey League team out of North Carolina offered to switch franchises with Berryman who turned the offer down.

In early 2003, rumors began to circulate that the RiverBlades would not return for the 2003–04 season, but the company denied the rumors. In June 2003, Equity Broadcasting ended the lease with Alltel Arena and announced that it would attempt to sell the team.

In 2008, rumors began to circulate about a new season in 2010–11, however these rumors could neither be confirmed nor denied. Additionally, with the December 8, 2008, filing of chapter 11 bankruptcy by Equity Media Holdings Corporation, this became unlikely.

== Playoffs ==
- 1999–00: Did not qualify.
- 2000–01: Defeated Baton Rouge 2-0 in qualifying round; lost to South Carolina 3-1 in first round.
- 2001–02: Did not qualify.
- 2002–03: Lost to Louisiana 3-0 in first round.
