= Scott Bertoli =

Canadian ice hockey player and team official

- Born: March 23, 1977 (age 48) Milton, ON, CAN
- Height: 5 ft 11 in (180 cm)
- Weight: 205 lb (93 kg; 14 st 9 lb)
- Position: Left wing
- Shot: Left
- Played for: AHL; Lowell Lock Monsters; Saint John Flames; Norfolk Admirals; ECHL; Trenton Titans
- NHL draft: Undrafted
- Playing career: 1999–2007

Scott Bertoli (born March 23, 1977) is a Canadian former professional ice hockey player. He was the Senior Advisor of Hockey Operations for the ECHL's Trenton Titans until their folding.

Prior to turning professional, Bertoli attended Princeton University, where he played four seasons of NCAA Division I college hockey with the Princeton Tigers men's ice hockey team.

On February 21, 2009, the Trenton Devils retired former Titan Kelly Cup champion Scott Bertoli's No. 19 in front of a crowd of 6,013 fans.

== Career statistics ==
Years	Team	Games Played	Goals	Assists	Points	Penalties (in Minutes)
1995–96	Princeton University (ECAC)	28	3	9	12	48
1996–97	Princeton Univ. (ECAC)	32	16	16	32	49
1997–98	Princeton Univ. (ECAC)	36	9	29	38	82
1998–99	Princeton Univ. (ECAC)	34	13	23	36	74
1999-00	Lowell Lock Monsters (AHL)	3	0	0	0	0
1999-00	Trenton Titans (ECHL)	65	21	44	65	46
2000–01	Trenton Titans (ECHL)	72	18	38	56	79
2001–02	Saint John Flames (AHL)	1	0	0	0	0
2001–02	Trenton Titans (ECHL)	69	25	46	71	125
2002–03	Trenton Titans (ECHL)	47	21	38	59	46
2003–04	Trenton Titans (ECHL)	56	19	42	61	56
2004–05	Trenton Titans (ECHL)	70	27	41	68	76
2005–06	Trenton Titans (ECHL)	64	20	47	67	84
2005–06	Norfolk Admirals (AHL)	9	2	3	5	4
2006–07	Trenton Titans (ECHL)	64	31	48	79	118

== Awards and honours ==
Award	Year
ECHL All-Decade Team	2000–2010
ECHL All-Star Team (National)	2000–01
ECHL All-Star Team (American)	2005–06
ECHL Second All-Star Team	2006–07
