= Kris Goodjohn =

Canadian ice hockey player

- Born: September 27, 1978 (age 47) Calgary, Alberta, Canada
- Height: 5 ft 11 in (180 cm)
- Weight: 192 lb (87 kg; 13 st 10 lb)
- Position: Forward
- Played for: Gwinnett Gladiators (ECHL); EHC München (Germany)
- NHL draft: Undrafted
- Playing career: 2003–2006

Kris Goodjohn (born September 27, 1978) is a Canadian former professional ice hockey player.

Goodjohn attended Union College where he played four years (1999 – 2003) of NCAA hockey with the Union Dutchmen, scoring 34 goals and 58 assists for 92 points, while earning 128 penalty minutes, in 134 games played.

Goodjohn went on to play two seasons with the Gwinnett Gladiators of the ECHL where he was recognized for his outstanding play when he was selected to receive the 2004–05 ECHL Sportsmanship Award.

Goodjohn spent the 2005-06 season in Germany with the EHC München before retiring as a player.

== Awards and honours ==
Award	Year	Ref
ECHL Sportsmanship Award	2004–05	
