= Troy G. Ward =

American ice hockey coach

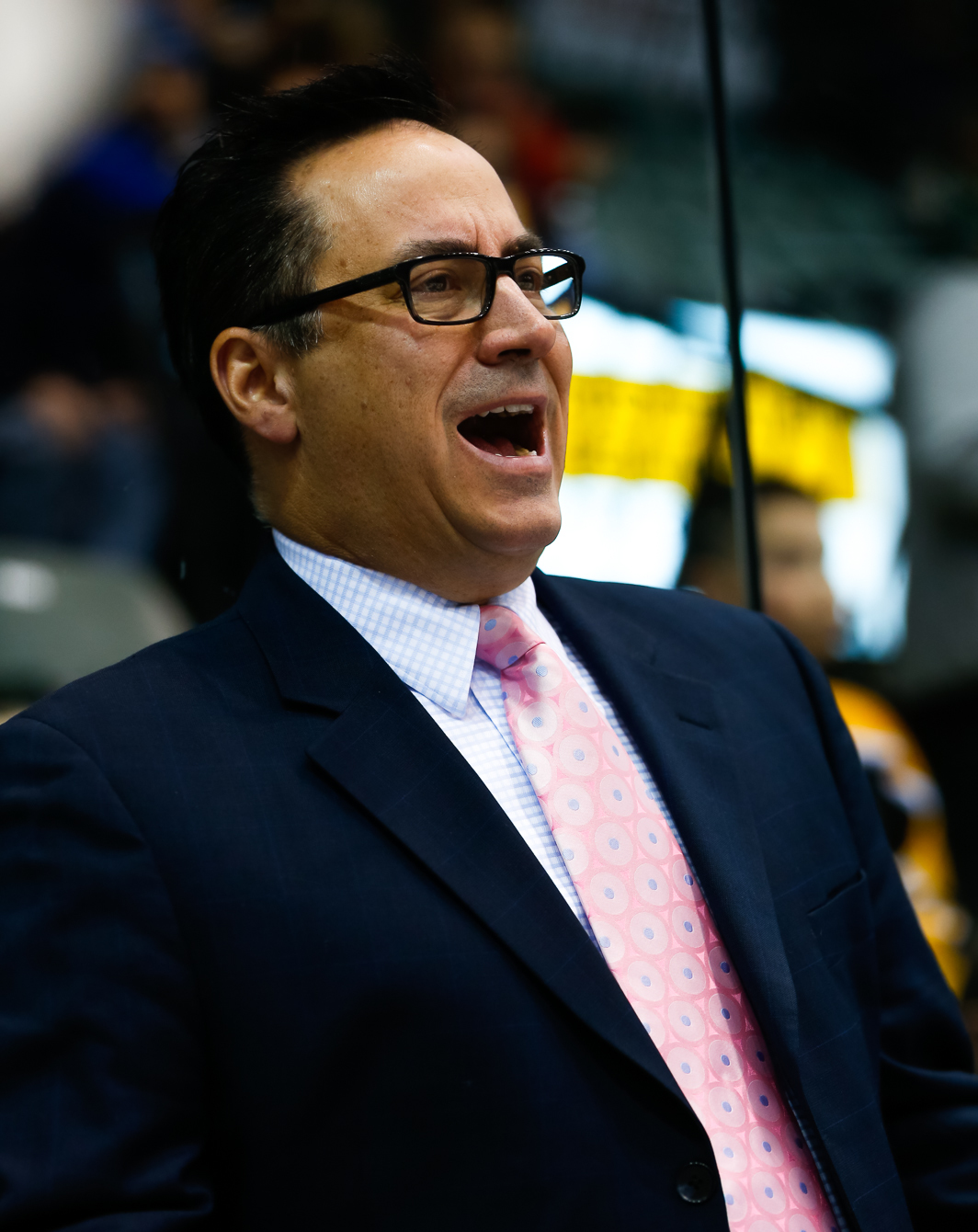
- Ward with the Abbotsford Heat in 2013
- Born: 4 June 1962 (age 64) North St. Paul, Minnesota, U.S.
- Height: 5 ft 11 in (180 cm)
- Position: Forward
- NHL draft: Undrafted
- Playing career: 1980–1984 Coaching career

Current position
- Title: Assistant Coach
- Team: Shanghai Dragons
- Conference: KHL

Biographical details
- Education: University of Wisconsin–Eau Claire

Playing career
- 1980–1984: Wisconsin–Eau Claire
- Position: Forward

Coaching career (HC unless noted)
- 1985–1987: Wisconsin–Eau Claire (asst.)
- 1987–1990: Wisconsin–Eau Claire
- 1990–1993: Denver (asst.)
- 1993–1995: Dubuque Fighting Saints (HC/GM)
- 1995–1997: Indianapolis Ice (asst.)
- 1997–2000: Pittsburgh Penguins (asst.)
- 2000–2001: Trenton Titans
- 2002–2005: Wisconsin (asst.)
- 2005–2006: Victoria Salmon Kings
- 2007–2010: Houston Aeros (asst.)
- 2010–2011: Abbotsford Heat (asst.)
- 2011–2014: Abbotsford Heat
- 2014–2015: Vancouver Giants
- 2015–2016: Madison Capitols (HC/GM)
- 2017–2019: Steinbach Black Wings
- 2023–2026: Minnesota State (asst.)
- 2026–Present: Shanghai Dragons (asst.)

Administrative career (AD unless noted)
- 2001–2002: ECHL (VP/Dir. of Hockey Ops)
- 2019–2022: Vancouver Canucks (Scout)
- 2022–2023: Sioux City Musketeers (GM)

Accomplishments and honors

Awards
- John Brophy Award – ECHL Coach of the Year (2000–01)

Troy G. Ward (born June 4, 1962) is an American ice hockey coach who is an assistant coach for the Shanghai Dragons of the Kontinental Hockey League (KHL), based in St. Petersburg, Russia. Ward spent three seasons (2023–2026) as associate head coach at Minnesota State University, Mankato, and three years (1997–2000) as an assistant coach with the Pittsburgh Penguins of the National Hockey League. Over a career spanning four decades, Ward has coached or worked in nine different leagues across four countries — NHL, KHL, IHL, AHL, ECHL, EBEL, WHL, USHL, and NCAA — a breadth of levels uncommon among hockey coaches, most of whom spend their careers within a single league or a closely related tier of the sport.

== Playing career ==
A 1984 graduate of University of Wisconsin, Eau Claire, Ward was team captain for the BluGolds as a forward for four years. In 1984, UW Eau Claire captured the NAIA Championship. Ward earned a master's degree in athletic administration and a bachelor's degree in physical education.

== Coaching career ==
Team	League	Season(s)	Position	GC
Wisconsin–Eau Claire	NCAA (WIAC)	1985–1987	Assistant coach	54
Wisconsin–Eau Claire	NCAA (WIAC)	1987–1990	Head coach	99
Denver	NCAA (WCHA)	1990–1993	Assistant coach	114
Dubuque Fighting Saints	USHL	1993–1995	Head coach / general manager	111
Indianapolis Ice	IHL	1995–1997	Assistant coach	173
Pittsburgh Penguins	NHL	1997–2000	Assistant coach	276
Trenton Titans	ECHL	2000–2001	Head coach	91
Wisconsin	NCAA (WCHA)	2002–2005	Assistant coach	133
Victoria Salmon Kings	ECHL	2005–2006	Head coach	34
Houston Aeros	AHL	2007–2010	Assistant coach	265
Abbotsford Heat	AHL	2010–2011	Assistant coach	80
Abbotsford Heat	AHL	2011–2014	Head coach	240
Vancouver Giants	WHL	2014–2015	Head coach	25
Madison Capitols	USHL	2015–2016	Head coach / general manager	60
Steinbach Black Wings Linz	EBEL	2017–2019	Head coach	108
Minnesota State	NCAA (CCHA)	2023–2026	Associate head coach	130
Shanghai Dragons	KHL	2026–present	Assistant coach	18 (ongoing)
Career total (regular season + playoffs)				2,011 completed, and rising

== Administrative career ==
Outside of bench coaching, Ward has also held front-office and scouting roles in professional hockey.

Organization	League	Season(s)	Position
ECHL (league office)	ECHL	2001–2002	Senior vice president and director of hockey operations
Vancouver Canucks	NHL	2019–2022	Professional scout
Sioux City Musketeers	USHL	2022–2023	General manager

== Hockey and Sons ==
Ward is the founder and director of Hockey and Sons, an annual youth ice hockey camp in which a parent attends camp alongside their child, held at Gustavus Adolphus College in St. Peter, Minnesota. As of 2026, the camp was in its 29th year, dating its founding to 1998. A companion camp, Hockey and Daughters, follows the same parent-and-child format for fathers and daughters.

== Media ==
During a gap in his coaching career, Ward worked as a radio color commentator for the Milwaukee Admirals of the American Hockey League (2005–06) and as a college hockey commentator for CSTV (College Sports Television).

== Awards and honors ==
Award	Year
John Brophy Award - ECHL Coach of the Year	2000–01
