= Jackson Bandits =

Defunct minor professional ice hockey team

- City: Jackson, Mississippi
- League: East Coast Hockey League
- Founded: 1997
- Operated: 1999–2003
- Home arena: Mississippi Coliseum

Franchise history
- 1997–1999: Chesapeake Icebreakers
- 1999–2003: Jackson Bandits

The Jackson Bandits were a minor league professional ice hockey team and member of the East Coast Hockey League (ECHL). The Bandits played at the Mississippi Coliseum in Jackson, Mississippi between 1999 and 2003. Previously the franchise played as the Chesapeake Icebreakers in Upper Marlboro, Maryland prior to their relocation following the 1998–99 season.

After being purchased in 1999 by a company called Mississippi Indoor Sports headed by majority owners and Mississippi businessmen Bernie Ebbers, the then MCI WorldCom president and CEO, and J.L. Holloway, the then president and CEO of Friede-Goldman International, the franchise was moved to Jackson, Mississippi, and began playing home games at the Mississippi Coliseum. The team was renamed the Jackson Bandits in reference to outlaws famous for robbing wealthy travelers along the Natchez Trace in the 19th century.

Derek Clancey, a former Chesapeake Icebreakers' star and eight-year veteran minor-league player, was named head coach and director of hockey operations, positions he would hold during the franchise's entire existence in Jackson.

Ebbers' interest in the Bandits was bought out by local businessmen/investors in 2002, shortly after his resignation as President/CEO of WorldCom. The new ownership group included Holloway, Brian Fenelon, Billy Mounger III, and Isaac Byrd.

After declining attendance and unsuccessful attempts to get a new arena built, the Bandits ceased operations in 2003 after the ECHL denied the team's request to suspend operations for a year.

== Playoffs ==
- 1999–00: Did not qualify.
- 2000–01: Lost to Mobile 3-2 in first round.
- 2001–02: Defeated New Orleans 1-0 in first round; defeated Louisiana 3-2 in second round; lost to Mississippi 3-0 in quarterfinals.
- 2002–03: Lost to Pensacola 1-0 in first round.
