= Trenton Titans =

American ice hockey club

- City: Trenton, New Jersey
- League: ECHL
- Conference: Eastern Conference
- Division: Atlantic Division
- Operated: 1999–2013
- Home arena: Sun National Bank Center
- Colors: Red, black, white
- Owner: Delaware Valley Sports Group LLC
- Media: The Trenton Times, The Trentonian, WPHY-CD

Franchise history
- 1999–2007: Trenton Titans
- 2007–2011: Trenton Devils
- 2011–2013: Trenton Titans

Championships
- Regular season titles: 1 (2000–01)
- Division titles: 2 (2000–01, 2001–02)
- Conference titles: 2 (2000–01, 2004–05)
- Kelly Cups: 1 (2004–05)

The Trenton Titans were a professional ice hockey team based in Trenton, New Jersey from 1999 to 2013. They were primarily the ECHL affiliate of the Philadelphia Flyers of the National Hockey League (NHL) and the Philadelphia Phantoms of the American Hockey League (AHL). They were also affiliated with the New York Islanders and New Jersey Devils of the NHL and the Bridgeport Sound Tigers of the AHL. They played at Sovereign Bank Arena.

During their first nine seasons from 1999 to 2005, the Titans qualified for the Kelly Cup playoffs eight times and routinely drew large crowds by ECHL standards. They finished with the best record in the ECHL in 2002, won the Northern Division in 2001 and 2002, won the Northern Conference in 2001 and 2005, and won the Kelly Cup in 2005. However, after the team's ownership and NHL affiliation were transferred to the New Jersey Devils, the team (which was renamed the Trenton Devils) struggled to draw fans, declining financially and on the ice. It regularly posted league-low attendance numbers and only made the Kelly Cup playoffs once (in 2009) in the six seasons after its Flyers affiliation ended in 2007. The team was sold again in 2011, returning to its prior name and affiliation with the Flyers. The Titans ceased operation in 2013.

As a result of the Titans closure, professional hockey in Trenton ceased until 2026, when the Trenton Ironhawks began playing in the ECHL. The Ironhawks play at the Titans' former home, which has since been renamed CURE Insurance Arena.

== History ==
=== Trenton Titans (1999–2007) ===
The East Coast Hockey League (later renamed the ECHL) awarded Trenton an expansion franchise in 1996, three years before the club played a game. The franchise started as the Trenton Titans and played their first season in 1999.

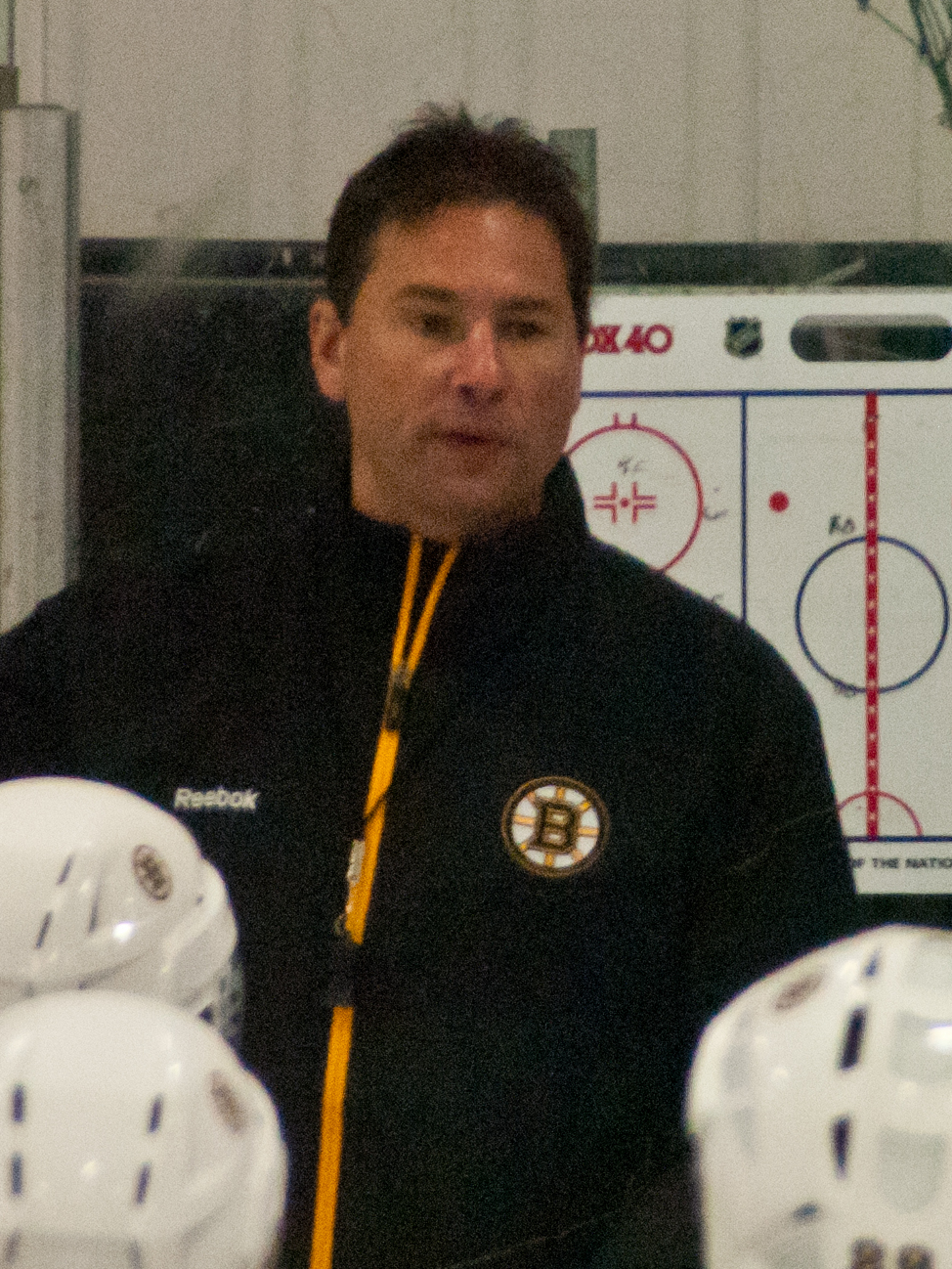
Bruce Cassidy, the team's inaugural coach, has had NHL success with the Bruins and Golden Knights.

==== 1999–2000 season ====
Bruce Cassidy was named the inaugural head coach. The team won 37 games and made an unexpectedly strong playoff run, losing the conference finals to the Peoria in six games. After the season, Cassidy was hired as the head coach of the Grand Rapids Griffins of the International Hockey League. Cassidy later coached the Washington Capitals from 2002 to 2004 and Boston Bruins from 2016 to 2022. He is currently the head coach of the Vegas Golden Knights, with whom he won a Stanley Cup in 2023.

Trenton was led offensively by Scott Bertoli, a 1999 graduate of nearby Princeton University who joined the team for its inaugural season. Bertoli would go on to play eight seasons for the team, setting numerous franchise records for scoring. He retired in 2007 and his number was retired by the team in 2009.

==== 2000–01 season: Brabham Cup winners and Kelly Cup finalists ====
The Titans put up a dominant second season in 2000–01 under former Pittsburgh Penguins assistant Troy Ward, beginning the year 20–5–1 on the road to winning the Brabham Cup with 104 points as the league's top regular season team. Ward won the John Brophy Award as coach of the year. Bertoli was joined on the attack by Aniket Dhadphale, who led the team with 65 points in 68 games, but the Titans' primary strength was defensive, allowing only 2.27 goals per game behind goaltender Scott Stirling, who joined the team from Brown University. Sterling won the Daley Trophy and Vitucci Award as rookie and goaltender of the year, respectively.

In the playoffs, Trenton defeated the Johnstown Chiefs and Toledo Storm to advance to the conference finals, facing Peoria for the second consecutive season. The Titans won the series in seven games, with the decisive Game Seven decided by a score of 4–3. They advanced to the 2001 Kelly Cup Final, where they lost to the South Carolina Stingrays in five games. Despite the final margin, the Final was highly competitive, with two overtime games, four games decided by a single goal, and just one two-goal game. After the season, Ward left the team to join the University of Wisconsin as an assistant coach.

==== 2001 through 2004: Atlantic City rivalry and disappointments ====
The Titans were dominant again in 2001–02 under Peter Horachek, putting up a second consecutive 100-point season and division title despite trading Nik Dhadphale to Peoria. They were joined in the Northeast Division by their new rivals, the Atlantic City Boardwalk Bullies, who were coached by former Titans assistant coach Mike Haviland and led by Scott Stirling, who left the Titans following his remarkable rookie season. From 2001 to 2005, the two teams competed for the Garden State Cup, awarded to the winner of the regular season series between them.

The Titans also hosted the ECHL All-Star Game at Sovereign Bank Arena. After defeating the Roanoke Express in the first round of the playoffs, they faced the Boardwalk Bullies in the conference semifinals. The Bullies won the first game in overtime, and Stirling only allowed two goals over the next two games to sweep the Titans out of the playoffs.

The next two seasons were disappointing. In 2002–03, the Titans won only 38 games, lost the Garden State Cup, and were again swept by Atlantic City in the opening round of the playoffs. Atlantic City went on to win the Kelly Cup in just their second season of existence. In 2003–04, the Titans got out to a poor start, won 37 games, and narrowly missed the playoffs for the first time.

==== 2004–05: Kelly Cup champions ====
Entering the 2004–05 season, the Titans hired Haviland away from Atlantic City. The 2004–05 season was marked by the contraction of the league from 31 to 28 teams, as well as the NHL lockout, which forced top-level talent from the AHL and even NHL into the ECHL. Despite this influx of talent to other teams, the Titans returned to the top of the division led by Bertoli and veteran winger Rick Kowalsky. In the first round of the playoffs, they avenged their prior losses by sweeping the Boardwalk Bullies in three games. The second and third games of the series were both decided in overtime. In the second round, the Titans faced the Reading Royals. Trenton dropped the first game by goals, but won the next three, each by one goal. The tiebreaking third game was decided in overtime.

The Titans traveled to Anchorage, Alaska to face the Alaska Aces in the Northern Conference finals. The Aces were led by NHL veteran and the 2005 ECHL MVP, center Scott Gomez of the New Jersey Devils. In the opening game, the Titans lost 0–6, but they won the second game, 7–1, to take home ice advantage for the remainder of the series. In games three and four, the Titans and Aces traded overtime victories, 4–3 and 3–4. Trenton took the lead in the series with a 3–0 shutout in game five, sending the series back to Alaska with the Titans ahead, 3 games to 2. Facing potential elimination, the Aces won game six in a third overtime, 1–2. In the decisive game seven, the Titans won another shutout, 2–0, to win the series, 4 games to 3.

In their second Kelly Cup Final, the Titans faced the Florida Everblades. Despite lacking home ice advantage, the Titans quickly won the first two games in Florida, 7–0 and 2–1. Upon the series return to Trenton, however, they lost the next two games, 4–5 in overtime and 3–6 to tie the series at two games each. Entering the third period of game five, the Titans trailed, 0–2, and Florida controlled the tempo of play. Facing the possibility of returning to Florida with their backs against the wall, the Titans defended home ice by scoring five goals in the third period to win 5–2. In game six, the Titans won, 4–1, to win the Kelly Cup, 4 games to 2. Leon Hayward was named Finals MVP.

After winning the Cup, Haviland was hired by the AHL's Norfolk Admirals and assistant coach Ted Dent was hired as the head coach of the Columbia Inferno. Haviland was named AHL coach of the year the following season, and he later won the Stanley Cup as an assistant coach with the Chicago Blackhawks in 2010. Dent later became head coach of the Rockford IceHogs of the AHL. Kowalsky, who had been the second leader scoring during the playoffs, retired.

The Titans would never return to the Kelly Cup and won only one playoff series in the 2007 preliminary round for the remaining six years of their history.

==== Garden State Cup ====
The Garden State Cup was awarded from 2002 to 2005 to the winner of the regular season series between the Titans and the Atlantic City Boardwalk Bullies:

- 2001–02: Trenton, 6–4
- 2002–03: Atlantic City, 6–4
- 2003–04: Trenton, 6–4
- 2004–05: Trenton, 5–3–2

The teams also met in the Kelly Cup playoffs three times, with each series resulting in a sweep:

- 2002 Northern Conference semifinals: Atlantic City, 3–0
- 2003 Northern Conference quarterfinals: Atlantic City, 3–0
- 2005 Northern Conference quarterfinals: Trenton, 3–0

The series and rivalry ended in 2005, when the Bullies relocated to Stockton, California to become the Stockton Thunder.

=== Trenton Devils (2007–2011) ===
Main logo (2007–2011)

In 2006, the New Jersey Devils bought the Trenton Titans. For the 2006–07 season, the team maintained their affiliation with the Flyers in addition to their affiliation with the Devils.

In 2007, the New Jersey Devils announced that the Titans were changing their name to the Trenton Devils. The re-branding alienated fans, many of whom were fans of the rival Flyers and, to a lesser extent, New York Rangers. The name change and the team's lackluster record led to a significant decline in attendance, positioning Trenton at or near the bottom of the league in attendance. The only exception was on February 21, 2009, when the Trenton Devils honored Scott Bertoli by retiring his number in front of a crowd of 6,013 fans.

=== Trenton Titans (2011–2013) ===
During the 2010–11 ECHL season, the Trenton Devils lost $1.5 million. On July 6, 2011, the New Jersey Devils announced that the Trenton Devils would suspend operations immediately, citing a desire to restructure their player development system. At the time, New Jersey was the only NHL team to wholly own its ECHL affiliate. The team had failed to qualify for the playoffs in three of the previous four seasons and had regularly posted league-low attendance numbers. The ECHL worked to find a new ownership group for the franchise, with the Flyers eager to affiliate again with franchise and help in cross-promotion. However, the Flyers were not interested in owning the franchise. Two weeks prior to the suspension, the ECHL re-registered the Trenton Titans name and logo with the United States Patent and Trademark Office. A group of local fans began lobbying investors to restart the franchise under the Titans name.

Blue Line Sports LLC, managed by John and Eileen Martinson, took over the team, restoring the original Titans name and logo and affiliating the team once again with the Philadelphia Flyers. Scott Bertoli was named senior adviser of hockey operations for the team. Richard Lisk, former Titans' general manager from 2001–05, rejoined the team and was appointed to be the franchise's president and CEO. Former defenseman and assistant coach Vince Williams was named head coach on August 1, 2011. Todd Fedoruk was named assistant coach on November 9, 2011. On March 28, 2012, Blue Line Sports LLC was sold to Delaware Valley Sports Group LLC, a group consisting of Lisk, Jim O'Connor, Jim Cook, and Tim Curran.

On August 28, 2012, the Titans announced the addition of Anaheim Ducks video coach Joe Trotta as an assistant coach. The Titans also announced an affiliation with the Danbury Whalers of the Federal Hockey League on September 10, 2012. This is one of the first times an ECHL team has affiliated with a lower minor league team.

Although the return to the prior name and Flyers affiliation led to a recovery in attendance, the team continued to struggle financially. On April 23, 2013, the Titans ceased operations for the 2013–14 season. All players were considered unrestricted free agents, effective immediately.

=== Affiliates ===
==== NHL ====
- Philadelphia Flyers (1999–2007, 2011–13)
- New York Islanders (1999–2003, 2005–06)
- Los Angeles Kings (1999–2000)
- New Jersey Devils (2006–11)

==== AHL ====
- Philadelphia/Adirondack Phantoms (1999–2007, 2011–13)
- Bridgeport Sound Tigers (2001–2003, 2005–06)
- Lowell Lock Monsters (1999–2001, 2006–07)
- Springfield Falcons (2003–04)
- Lowell Devils (2006–10)
- Albany Devils (2010–11)

===== FHL =====
- Danbury Whalers (2012–13)

=== Attendance ===
The following is the average home attendance for the franchise by season:

- 1999–00: 7,082
- 2000–01: 6,695
- 2001–02: 5,932
- 2002–03: 5,299
- 2003–04: 5,059
- 2004–05: 5,020
- 2005–06: 4,300
- 2006–07: 3,515
- 2007–08: 3,315
- 2008–09: 2,754
- 2009–10: 2,509
- 2010–11: 2,390
- 2011–12: 3,013
- 2012–13: 3,360

== Season-by-season record ==
Kelly Cup Champions	Conference champions	Division champions

Season	Games	Won	Lost	Tied	OTL	SOL	Points	PCT	Goals For	Goals Against	Standing	Playoffs					
Season	Games	Won	Lost	Tied	OTL	SOL	Points	PCT	Goals For	Goals Against	Standing	Year	Prelims	1st round	2nd round	3rd round	Finals
1999–2000	70	37	29	4	—	—	78	0.557	233	199	4th, Northeast	2000		W, 3–0, RIC	W, 3–2, HMR	L, 2–4, PEO	—
2000–01	72	50	18	4	—	—	104	0.722	236	164	1st, Northeast	2001		W, 3–1, JHN	W, 3–0, TOL	W, 4–3, PEO	L, 1–4, SCS
2001–02	72	46	16	10	—	—	102	0.708	238	178	1st, Northeast	2002		W, 3–1, ROA	L, 0–3, ATC	—	—
2002–03	72	38	24	10	—	—	86	0.597	229	207	4th, Northeast	2003		L, 0–3, ATC	—	—	—
2003–04	72	37	28	7	—	—	81	0.563	222	193	6th, North	2004		Did not qualify			
2004–05	72	42	21	9	—	—	93	0.646	213	197	T-1st, North	2005		W, 3–0, ATC	W, 3–1, RDR	W, 4–3, AKA	W, 4–2, FLA
2005–06	72	31	36	5	—	—	67	0.465	166	214	5th, East	2006	L, 0–2, JHN	—	—	—	—
2006–07	72	36	31	—	1	4	77	0.535	250	242	4th, North	2007	W, 2–0, JHN	L, 0–3, DAY	—	—	—
2007–08	72	29	36	—	3	4	65	0.451	183	220	6th, North	2008		Did not qualify			
2008–09	72	40	25	—	2	5	87	0.604	236	206	2nd, North	2009		L, 3–4, ELM	—	—	—
2009–10	72	33	30	—	4	5	75	0.521	244	252	3rd, East	2010		Did not qualify			
2010–11	72	27	37	—	2	6	62	0.431	218	257	3rd, Atlantic	2011		Did not qualify			
2011–12	72	21	41	—	4	6	52	0.361	211	271	4th, Atlantic	2012		Did not qualify			
2012–13	72	32	32	—	4	4	72	0.500	226	247	4th, Atlantic	2013		Did not qualify			

== Team records ==
=== Season ===
- P: 79 – Scott Bertoli (2006–07)
- G: 36 – Mike Pandolfo (2006–07)
- A: 53 – Ryan Gunderson (2008–09)
- PIM: 305 – Graham Belak (2001–02)
- Appearances (by goaltender): 48 – Scott Stirling, (2000–01)
- Minutes (by goaltender): 2,722 – Andrew Allen (2004–05)
- Wins: 32 – Scott Stirling (2000–01)
- Shutouts: 5 – Scott Stirling (2000–01)

=== Single game ===
- P: 7 – David Hoogsteen (vs. Toledo, March 24, 2000)
- G: 5 – Mathieu Brunelle (vs. Augusta, January 31, 2004)
- A: 5 – Colin Pepperall (vs. Dayton, January 19, 2008) and David Hoogsteen (vs. Toledo, March 24, 2000)
- PIM: 33 – Todd Fedoruk vs. Roanoke (February 19, 2000)

== General managers ==
- Brian McKenna: 1999–2002
- Richard Lisk: 2002–2004
- Jeffrey Mandel: 2004–2005
- Jim Leahy: 2005–2011
- Richard Lisk: 2011–2013

== Head coaches ==
- Bruce Cassidy: 1999–2000
- Troy Ward: 2000–2001
- Peter Horachek: 2001–2002
- Bill Armstrong: 2002–2004
- Mike Haviland: 2004–2005
- Doug McKay: 2005–2006
- Rick Kowalsky: 2006–2010
- Kevin Dean: 2010–2011
- Vince Williams: 2011–2013

== Retired numbers ==
19: Scott Bertoli (Retired on February 21, 2009; Re-dedicated on October 22, 2011)

== Media ==
The Titans were covered by the two city newspapers, The Trenton Times and The Trentonian. Hunterdon County Democrat writer Mike Ashmore kept an active blog of the team during their time as the Devils. WRRC (107.7 FM The Bronc) carried all Titans games, both over-the-air and through an Internet link, with Daryle Dobos calling the action.

The games were broadcast on radio during the first nine years of existence on WHWH, WBCB-AM, and WTSR, In 2008, the broadcasts switched to internet-only, and were handled by first-year play-by-play announcer Paul Roper, who was selected to broadcast the 2009 ECHL All-Star Game.

Preceded by Idaho Steelheads	Kelly Cup; 2004–05	Succeeded by Alaska Aces
