= 2004–05 ECHL season =

Ice hockey league season

- League: ECHL
- Sport: Ice hockey

Regular season
- Brabham Cup: Pensacola Ice Pilots
- Season MVP: Scott Gomez (Alaska)
- Top scorer: Scott Gomez (Alaska)

Playoffs
- American champions: Florida Everblades
- American runners-up: Charlotte Checkers
- National champions: Trenton Titans
- National runners-up: Alaska Aces
- Playoffs MVP: Leon Hayward (Trenton)

Finals
- Champions: Trenton Titans
- Runners-up: Florida Everblades

ECHL seasons
- ← 2003–04 2005–06 →

The 2004–05 ECHL season was the 17th season of the ECHL. The Brabham Cup regular season champions were the Pensacola Ice Pilots and the Kelly Cup playoff champions were the Trenton Titans.

During this season, the National Hockey League cancelled its season due to the player lockout. This led to many players who would normally be in the American Hockey League pushed out of roster spots by the younger NHL players back into the ECHL. Some NHL players also found work in the ECHL, some as a way to return to their hometowns (or their wives'), and others to give back to the league which gave them a start. Scott Gomez chose to return home to his Anchorage roots and played for the Alaska Aces. Curtis Brown played for his wife's hometown in San Diego. Jeremy Stevenson, who played his first professional season with Greensboro ten years before, returned to the Carolinas with the South Carolina Stingrays. Stevenson's NHL teammate Shane Hnidy, who played 21 games with the former Baton Rouge Kingfish as a rookie, returned to the South playing for the Florida Everblades. Hnidy and Stevenson would find themselves playing against each other in the first round of the Kelly Cup Playoffs. Bates Battaglia joined his younger brother Anthony on the Mississippi Sea Wolves of the ECHL.

== League changes ==
After the 2003–04 season, the Columbus Cottonmouths, Greensboro Generals, and Roanoke Express franchises all ceased operations as their franchises were revoked. The Columbus organization joined the Southern Professional Hockey League for 2004–05 as one of its inaugural members. Their ECHL franchise had planned to be in Bradenton, Florida, as the Gulf Coast Swords but eventually had its franchise revoked in the September 2006 ECHL Board of Governors meeting after several issues led to them never completing their arena. The Cincinnati Cyclones requested a voluntary suspension of franchise, which was lifted for the 2006–07 season, when the crosstown Cincinnati Mighty Ducks ownership failed to secure an American Hockey League franchise.

The league added one team for the season, their first Canadian franchise, the Victoria Salmon Kings. The Salmon Kings purchased the defunct Baton Rouge Kingfish franchise and relocated its home territory to Victoria.

=== Realignment ===
The league also adopted a "Mason-Dixon" format, as the conferences were split on the Mason–Dixon line, with the National Conference teams being north of the line and American Conference teams south of the line creating a "North vs South" format.

=== All-Star Game ===
The ECHL All-Star Game was held at the Sovereign Center in Reading, Pennsylvania, and was hosted by the Reading Royals. The National Conference All-Stars defeated the American Conference All-Stars 6–2, with Idaho's Frank Doyle named Most Valuable Player.

== Regular season ==
=== Final standings ===
Note: GP = Games played; W = Wins; L= Losses; OTL = Overtime Losses; SOL = Shootout Losses; GF = Goals for; GA = Goals against; Pts = Points
Green shade = Clinched playoff spot; Blue shade = Clinched division; (z) = Clinched home-ice advantage

==== American Conference ====
East Division	GP	W	L	OTL	SOL	PTS	GF	GA
Columbia Inferno	72	38	22	4	8	88	199	186
South Carolina Stingrays	72	39	24	3	6	87	230	219
Charlotte Checkers	72	39	26	2	5	85	226	219
Greenville Grrrowl	72	39	28	0	5	83	210	204
Pee Dee Pride	72	31	36	2	3	67	203	219
Augusta Lynx	72	28	35	5	4	65	188	237

South Division	GP	W	L	OTL	SOL	PTS	GF	GA
Pensacola Ice Pilots (z)	72	51	16	2	3	107	248	178
Florida Everblades	72	42	20	4	6	94	237	192
Gwinnett Gladiators	72	40	24	1	7	88	241	202
Mississippi Sea Wolves	72	39	24	4	5	87	223	215
Louisiana IceGators	72	26	40	2	4	58	192	266
Texas Wildcatters	72	17	44	2	9	45	178	260

==== National Conference ====
North Division	GP	W	L	OTL	SOL	PTS	GF	GA
Reading Royals	72	43	22	2	5	93	220	161
Trenton Titans	72	42	21	4	5	93	220	161
Atlantic City Boardwalk Bullies	72	42	22	3	5	92	205	189
Toledo Storm	72	41	26	2	3	87	203	194
Peoria Rivermen	72	38	26	2	6	84	213	177
Wheeling Nailers	72	38	29	2	3	81	171	173
Johnstown Chiefs	72	22	36	5	9	58	191	258
Dayton Bombers	72	23	40	2	7	55	175	225

West Division	GP	W	L	OTL	SOL	PTS	GF	GA
Alaska Aces (z)	72	45	19	3	5	98	233	187
Long Beach Ice Dogs	72	43	20	4	5	95	220	181
Idaho Steelheads	72	42	23	2	5	91	223	183
Bakersfield Condors	72	40	22	5	5	90	232	205
Fresno Falcons	72	39	25	3	5	86	204	217
San Diego Gulls	72	35	29	4	4	78	206	222
Las Vegas Wranglers	72	31	33	3	5	70	201	199
Victoria Salmon Kings	72	15	52	3	2	35	178	298

=== Scoring leaders ===
Note: GP = Games played; G = Goals; A = Assists; Pts = Points; PIM = Penalty minutes

Player	Team	GP	G	A	Pts
Scott Gomez	AK	61	13	73	86
Carl Mallette	TOL	64	30	50	80
Jamie Johnson	AUG	72	22	58	80
Chris Minard	AK	69	49	29	78
Joe Tenute	SC	68	34	41	75
Wes Mason	LA	72	31	39	70
Brian McCullough	PEO	71	39	30	69
Kris Goodjohn	GWT	69	21	48	69
Evan Cheverie	LB	72	29	39	68
Scott Bertoli	TRE	70	27	41	68

=== Leading goaltenders ===
Note: GP = Games played; Mins = Minutes played; W = Wins; L = Losses; T = Ties; GA = Goals allowed; SO = Shutouts; GAA = Goals against average

Player	Team	GP	Mins	W	L	T	GA	SO	Sv%	GAA
Dany Sabourin	WHL	27	1578	19	6	1	44	5	.942	1.67
Barry Brust	REA	42	2413	27	9	4	79	4	.928	1.96
Alfie Michaud	PEO	48	2712	27	13	5	92	6	.929	2.04
Tyler MacKay	FLA	27	1601	18	7	2	56	2	.921	2.10
Chris Madden	LB	28	1598	19	5	2	57	5	.941	2.14

== Kelly Cup playoffs ==
Conference quarterfinals	Conference semifinals
A1	Pensacola	1
A8	Greenville	3
A8	Greenville	0
A3	Florida	3
A3	Florida	3
A6	South Carolina	1
American Conference
A4	Gwinnett	3
A5	Mississippi	1
A4	Gwinnett	1
A7	Charlotte	3
A2	Columbia	2
A7	Charlotte	3
N1	Reading	3
N4	Toledo	1
N1	Reading	1
N2	Trenton	3
N2	Trenton	3
N3	Atlantic City	0
National Conference
W1	Alaska	3
W4	Bakersfield	2
W1	Alaska	3
W2	Long Beach	0
W2	Long Beach	3
W3	Idaho	1

Conference finals
A3	Florida	4
A7	Charlotte	2
N2	Trenton	4
W1	Alaska	3

Kelly Cup finals
A3	Florida	2
N2	Trenton	4

== ECHL awards ==
Patrick Kelly Cup:	Trenton Titans
Henry Brabham Cup:	Pensacola Ice Pilots
Gingher Memorial Trophy:	Florida Everblades
Bruce Taylor Trophy:	Trenton Titans
John Brophy Award:	Nick Vitucci (Toledo)
CCM TACKS Most Valuable Player:	Scott Gomez (Alaska)
Kelly Cup Playoffs Most Valuable Player:	Leon Hayward (Trenton)
Reebok Hockey Goaltender of the Year:	Chris Madden (Long Beach)
CCM Tacks Rookie of the Year:	Joe Tenute (South Carolina)
Defenseman of the Year:	Ray DiLauro (Wheeling)
Leading Scorer:	Scott Gomez (Alaska)
Reebok Hockey Plus Performer Award:	Aaron Philips (Pensacola)
Sportsmanship Award:	Kris Goodjohn (Gwinnett)

== See also ==
- List of ECHL seasons
- 2004 in sports
- 2005 in sports
