= New Orleans Brass =

Defunct minor professional ice hockey team

- City: New Orleans, Louisiana
- League: East Coast Hockey League
- Founded: 1997
- Operated: 1997–2002
- Home arena: Municipal Auditorium (1997–1999); New Orleans Arena (1999–2002)
- Colors: Purple, gold
- General manager: Dan Belisle
- Head coach: Ted Sator

Franchise history
- 1997–2002: New Orleans Brass

The New Orleans Brass were a hockey team in the ECHL from 1997 to 2002. The team was at one time affiliated with the San Jose Sharks. Home games were played first at the New Orleans Municipal Auditorium (until October 29, 1999) and then at the New Orleans Arena. In 2002, the NBA's Charlotte Hornets moved to New Orleans and became the primary tenant in the arena. The New Orleans Hornets (now the New Orleans Pelicans) pressured the state of Louisiana, which owns the arena, into demanding that the Brass bear the expense of converting the arena to and from basketball and hockey as a condition of staying in the arena. The expense was more than the Brass' ownership was willing to pay. The Municipal Auditorium had recently replaced its floor, and in the process removed its ice plant. Without a suitable home, the Brass folded.

The only head coach of the Brass was Ted Sator. The team's first GM was Larry Kish, who was succeeded by Dan Belisle. Future New Orleans mayor Ray Nagin was a co-owner and president of the team. The most prominent player was former Boston Bruin Jeff Lazaro, who was one of two players to play every season for the Brass, and who is the team's career leader in most statistical categories.

The Brass made the playoffs every year, winning three series, two in the 1998–99 season (the same season the Brass earned its worst record), and one in the 2000–01 season, putting the Brass in the conference semifinals and quarterfinals, respectively. The principal rivals of the Brass were the Louisiana IceGators and the Mississippi Sea Wolves (Biloxi, MS). The Baton Rouge Kingfish were another, intrastate rival for the Brass.

The team's games were broadcast in New Orleans on radio station WSMB (now WWWL). The first radio voice of the Brass was Steve Carroll, who is now the radio voice of the Anaheim Ducks.

== Season results ==
Season	GP	W	L	T	OTL	PCT	Playoff Result
1997–98	70	36	24	10	0	.586	Lost in Round 1
1998–99	70	30	27	13	0	.521	Lost in Round 3
1999–00	70	36	27	0	7	.564	Lost in Round 1
2000–01	72	35	25	12	0	.569	Lost in Round 2
2001–02	72	36	32	4	0	.528	Lost in Round 1

== Playoffs ==
- 1997–98: Lost to Pensacola 3–1 in first round.
- 1998–99: Defeated Jacksonville 2–0 in first round; defeated Louisiana 3–2 in second round; lost to Pee Dee 3–1 in quarterfinals.
- 1999–00: Lost to Augusta 2–1 in first round.
- 2000–01: Defeated Augusta 2–1 in first round; lost to Louisiana 3–2 in second round.
- 2001–02: Lost to Jackson 1–0 in first round.

== Notable NHL alumni ==
List of New Orleans Brass alumni who played more than 25 games in New Orleans and 25 or more games in the National Hockey League.

- Kimbi Daniels
- Gordie Dwyer
- Jeff Lazaro
