= 2000–01 ECHL season =

Ice hockey league season

The 13th season of the ECHL was played in 2000–01. Before the season, the league lost three members as the Huntington Blizzard and the Jacksonville Lizard Kings ceased operations and the powerhouse Hampton Roads Admirals were replaced by the Norfolk Admirals in the American Hockey League. The league also decided to expand the regular season to 72 games. The Trenton Titans finished first overall in the regular season, and the South Carolina Stingrays won their second Kelly Cup defeating the Trenton Titans four games to one.

== Regular season ==
=== Final standings ===
Note: GP = Games played; W = Wins; L= Losses; T = Ties; GF = Goals for; GA = Goals against; Pts = Points; Green shade = Clinched playoff spot; Blue shade = Clinched division; (z) = Clinched home-ice advantage

==== Northern Conference ====
Northeast Division	GP	W	L	T	Pts	GF	GA
Trenton Titans	72	50	18	4	104	236	164
Roanoke Express	72	38	30	4	80	231	195
Charlotte Checkers	72	34	26	12	80	247	252
Richmond Renegades	72	35	31	6	76	223	228
Greensboro Generals	72	26	39	7	59	215	277

Northwest Division	GP	W	L	T	Pts	GF	GA
Peoria Rivermen	72	45	17	10	100	238	182
Dayton Bombers	72	45	21	6	96	247	194
Toledo Storm	72	37	27	8	82	262	259
Johnstown Chiefs	72	28	36	8	64	207	238
Wheeling Nailers	72	24	40	8	56	192	277

==== Southern Conference ====
Southeast Division	GP	W	L	T	Pts	GF	GA
South Carolina Stingrays	72	42	23	7	91	240	210
Florida Everblades	72	38	26	8	84	236	242
Pee Dee Pride	72	38	28	6	82	242	231
Augusta Lynx	72	36	29	7	79	259	253
Greenville Grrrowl	72	34	33	5	73	219	239
Tallahassee Tiger Sharks†	72	38	27	7	68	248	219

Southwest Division	GP	W	L	T	Pts	GF	GA
Louisiana IceGators	72	42	24	6	90	237	209
Jackson Bandits	72	39	24	9	87	206	209
Mobile Mysticks	72	38	28	6	82	242	231
New Orleans Brass	72	35	25	12	82	247	239
Arkansas RiverBlades	72	34	24	14	82	237	232
Baton Rouge Kingfish	72	35	26	11	81	216	225
Mississippi Sea Wolves	72	34	33	5	73	221	218
Birmingham Bulls	72	28	40	4	60	224	296
Pensacola Ice Pilots	72	27	40	5	59	201	250

†-Tallahassee was penalized 15 points for salary cap violations (from 83 to 68), knocking them out of a playoff spot

== Kelly Cup playoffs ==
=== Northern Conference ===
==== Bracket ====
Conference Quarterfinals (Best of 5)
1	Trenton	3
8	Johnstown	1
4	Toledo	3
5	Roanoke	2
3	Dayton	3
6	Charlotte	2
2	Peoria	3
7	Richmond	1

Conference Semifinals (Best of 5)
1	Trenton	3
4	Toledo	0
3	Dayton	0
2	Peoria	3

Conference Finals (Best of 7)
1	Trenton	4
2	Peoria	3

==== Quarterfinals ====
(1) Trenton vs. (8) Johnstown
Date	Away	Home	
April 7	Johnstown 0	Trenton 2	
April 8	Johnstown 3	Trenton 4	OT
April 13	Trenton 1	Johnstown 3	
April 14	Trenton 5	Johnstown 1	
Trenton wins series 3–1

(2) Peoria vs. (7) Richmond
Date	Away	Home
April 9	Richmond 3	Peoria 0
April 10	Richmond 2	Peoria 3
April 12	Peoria 4	Richmond 1
April 13	Peoria 4	Richmond 0
Peoria wins series 3–1

(3) Dayton vs. (6) Charlotte
Date	Away	Home	
April 6	Charlotte 3	Dayton 2	2OT
April 7	Charlotte 2	Dayton 3	OT
April 12	Dayton 5	Charlotte 4	OT
April 14	Dayton 1	Charlotte 4	
April 17	Charlotte 2	Dayton 5	
Dayton wins series 3–2

(4) Toledo vs. (5) Roanoke
Date	Away	Home	
April 6	Roanoke 2	Toledo 3	OT
April 7	Roanoke 4	Toledo 2	
April 12	Toledo 4	Roanoke 3	
April 14	Toledo 1	Roanoke 2	2OT
April 17	Roanoke 2	Toledo 5	
Toledo wins series 3–2

==== Semifinals ====
(1) Trenton vs. (4) Toledo
Date	Away	Home	
April 23	Toledo 0	Trenton 6	
April 24	Toledo 2	Trenton 4	
April 27	Trenton 3	Toledo 2	OT
Trenton wins series 3–0

(2) Peoria vs. (3) Dayton
Date	Away	Home	
April 21	Peoria 4	Dayton 3	OT
April 23	Dayton 2	Peoria 4	
April 24	Dayton 1	Peoria 2	
Peoria wins series 3–0

==== Finals ====
(1) Trenton vs. (2) Peoria
Date	Away	Home	
May 2	Peoria 1	Trenton 4	
May 4	Peoria 4	Trenton 1	
May 6	Trenton 2	Peoria 1	
May 8	Trenton 3	Peoria 1	
May 9	Trenton 5	Peoria 6	OT
May 11	Peoria 3	Trenton 0	
May 13	Peoria 3	Trenton 4	
Trenton wins series 4–3

=== Southern Conference ===
==== Bracket ====
Conference Wild Card (Best of 3)
8	Arkansas	2
9	Baton Rouge	0
7	New Orleans	2
10	Augusta	1

Conference Quarterfinals (Best of 5)
1	South Carolina	3
8	Arkansas	1
3	Jackson	2
6	Mobile	3
4	Florida	2
5	Pee Dee	3
2	Louisiana	3
7	New Orleans	2

Conference Semifinals (Best of 5)
1	South Carolina	3
6	Mobile	2
5	Pee Dee	2
2	Louisiana	3

Conference Finals (Best of 7)
1	South Carolina	4
2	Louisiana	0

==== Wild Card ====
NOTE: These series are two-game series; if the series is tied at one game each, the two teams immediately played a 10-minute period to determine the team that advances to the quarterfinals. If the ten-minute period ends in a tie, sudden death overtime would be played as if it was a standard playoff game.

(7) New Orleans vs. (10) Augusta
Date	Away	Home
April 3	Augusta 2	New Orleans 4
April 4	New Orleans 3	Augusta 9
April 4*	New Orleans 1	Augusta 0
New Orleans wins series 2–1

(8) Arkansas vs. (9) Baton Rouge
Date	Away	Home	
April 3	Baton Rouge 3	Arkansas 4	OT
April 4	Arkansas 4	Baton Rouge 3	
Arkansas wins series 2–0

* The New Orleans-Augusta series ended as a 1–1 tie; a ten-minute period was played to determine the winner of the series.

==== Quarterfinals ====
(1) South Carolina vs. (8) Arkansas
Date	Away	Home
April 6	Arkansas 3	South Carolina 7
April 9	South Carolina 4	Arkansas 1
April 10	South Carolina 3	Arkansas 5
April 13	Arkansas 3	South Carolina 6
South Carolina wins series 3–1

(2) Louisiana vs. (7) New Orleans
Date	Away	Home	
April 6	New Orleans 7	Louisiana 8	2OT
April 8	New Orleans 5	Louisiana 3	
April 10	Louisiana 4	New Orleans 1	
April 12	Louisiana 2	New Orleans 3	
April 14	New Orleans 1	Louisiana 3	
Louisiana wins series 3–2

(3) Jackson vs. (6) Mobile
Date	Away	Home
April 6	Mobile 1	Jackson 0
April 7	Jackson 7	Mobile 2
April 10	Mobile 3	Jackson 4
April 12	Jackson 2	Mobile 5
April 13	Mobile 5	Jackson 1
Mobile wins series 3–2

(4) Florida vs. (5) Pee Dee
Date	Away	Home	
April 6	Pee Dee 4	Florida 1	
April 7	Pee Dee 2	Florida 4	
April 13	Florida 4	Pee Dee 2	
April 14	Florida 2	Pee Dee 3	OT
April 17	Pee Dee 5	Florida 3	
Pee Dee wins series 3–2

==== Semifinals ====
(1) South Carolina vs. (6) Mobile
Date	Away	Home	
April 19	Mobile 2	South Carolina 4	
April 20	Mobile 5	South Carolina 4	OT
April 27	South Carolina 4	Mobile 7	
April 28	South Carolina 6	Mobile 3	
May 1	Mobile 2	South Carolina 3	2OT
South Carolina wins series 3–2

(2) Louisiana vs. (5) Pee Dee
Date	Away	Home
April 20	Louisiana 6	Pee Dee 3
April 21	Louisiana 4	Pee Dee 1
April 27	Pee Dee 4	Louisiana 2
April 29	Pee Dee 6	Louisiana 4
May 1	Pee Dee 3	Louisiana 4
Louisiana wins series 3–2

==== Finals ====
(1) South Carolina vs. (2) Louisiana
Date	Away	Home
May 3	Louisiana 1	South Carolina 4
May 5	Louisiana 0	South Carolina 4
May 9	South Carolina 3	Louisiana 2
May 11	South Carolina 5	Louisiana 4
South Carolina wins series 4–0

=== Kelly Cup finals ===
Kelly Cup Finals
N.1	Trenton	1
S.1	South Carolina	4

(N.1) Trenton vs. (S.1) South Carolina
Date	Away	Home	
May 18	South Carolina 3	Trenton 2	OT
May 20	South Carolina 5	Trenton 3	
May 22	Trenton 4	South Carolina 3	2OT
May 24	Trenton 5	South Carolina 6	
May 27	Trenton 2	South Carolina 3	
South Carolina wins series 4–1

== ECHL awards ==
Patrick J. Kelly Cup:	South Carolina Stingrays
Henry Brabham Cup:	Trenton Titans
Northern Conference Champion:	Trenton Titans
Southern Conference Champion:	South Carolina Stingrays
John Brophy Award:	Troy Ward (Trenton)
ECHL Most Valuable Player:	Scott King (Charlotte)
Kelly Cup Playoffs Most Valuable Player:	Dave Seitz (South Carolina)
ECHL Goaltender of the Year:	Scott Stirling (Trenton)
ECHL Rookie of the Year:	Scott Stirling (Trenton)
Defenseman of the Year:	Tom Nemeth (Dayton)
Leading Scorer:	Scott King (Charlotte)
Plus Performer Award:	Jay Murphy (Louisiana)
Sportsmanship Award:	Jamie Ling (Dayton)

== See also ==
- ECHL All-Star Game
- List of ECHL seasons
- 2000 in sports
- 2001 in sports
