= 2006–07 ECHL season =

Ice hockey league season

- League: ECHL
- Sport: Ice hockey
- Duration: October 2006 – May 2007

Regular season
- Brabham Cup: Las Vegas Wranglers
- Season MVP: Brad Schell (Gwinnett)
- Top scorer: Brad Schell (Gwinnett)

Playoffs
- American champions: Dayton Bombers
- American runners-up: Florida Everblades
- National champions: Idaho Steelheads
- National runners-up: Alaska Aces
- Playoffs MVP: Steve Silverthorn (Idaho)

Finals
- Champions: Idaho Steelheads
- Runners-up: Dayton Bombers

ECHL seasons
- ← 2005–06 2007–08 →

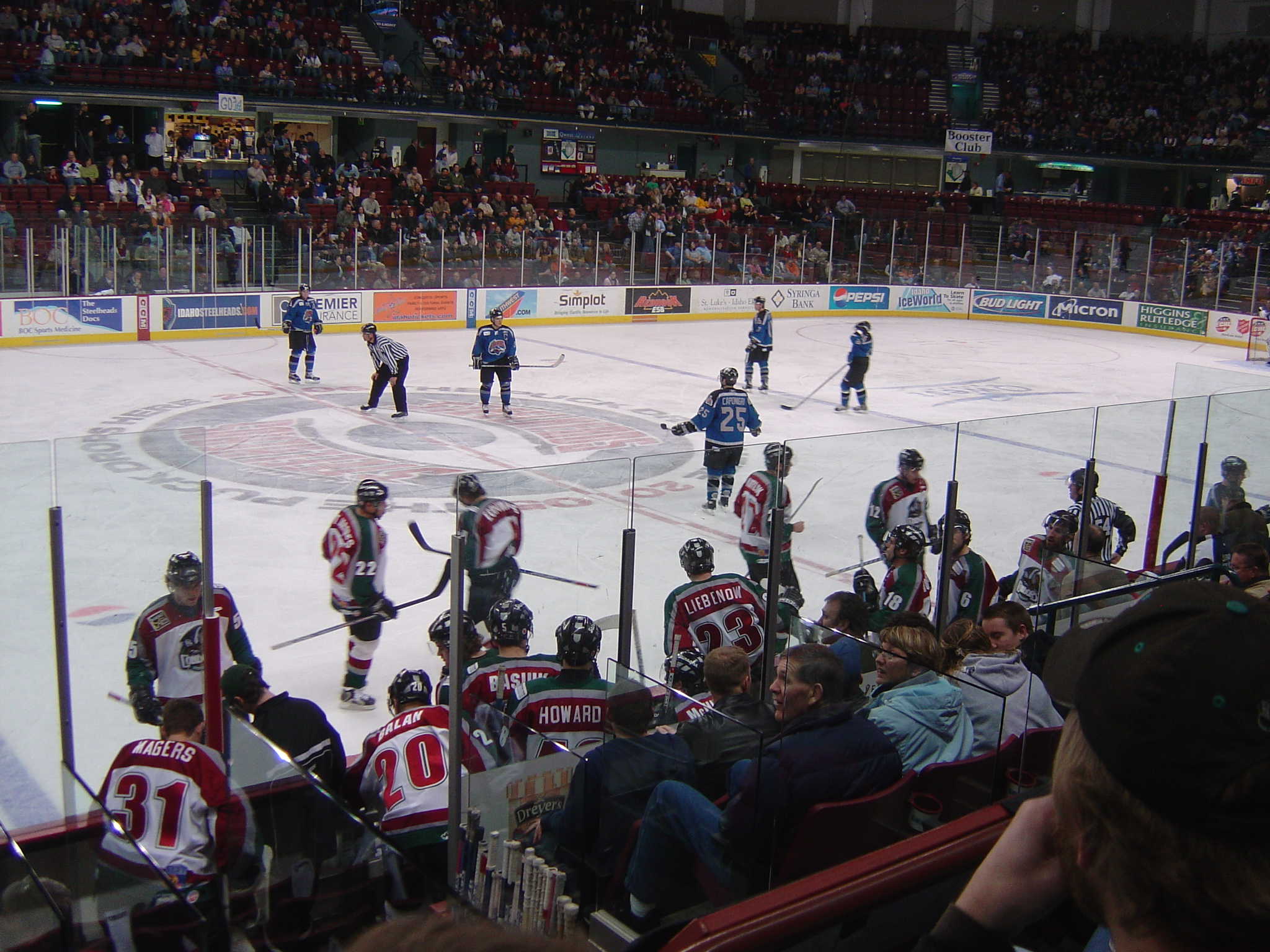
Idaho Steelheads vs Bakersfield Condors

The 2006–07 ECHL season was the 19th season of the ECHL. The league had 25 teams for 2006–07. The Brabham Cup regular season champions were the Las Vegas Wranglers and the Kelly Cup playoff champions were the Idaho Steelheads.

== League changes ==
Two teams returned to the ECHL after suspensions: the Texas Wildcatters and the Cincinnati Cyclones. The Wildcatters had to suspend operations for the 2005–06 season as a byproduct of damage to their home arena caused by Hurricane Rita. The Cyclones returned after ceasing operations following the 2003–04 season in trying to secure an American Hockey League franchise.

The Board of Governors revoked the Greenville Grrrowl franchise and the San Diego Gulls had returned its franchise.

The New Jersey Devils purchased the Trenton Titans and the team became the ECHL affiliate of the Devils. The Titans still maintained their affiliation with the Philadelphia Flyers for the season. After the purchase of the Titans, the New Jersey Devils renamed the franchise's operator Trenton Titans, LLC to Trenton Devils, LLC.

=== Realignment ===
At the 2006 pre-season meeting of the ECHL Board of Governors, the ECHL announced the alignment of the 25 teams. The Las Vegas Wranglers were moved from the West to the Pacific Division to replace the departed San Diego Gulls, the returning Texas Wildcatters replaced the Grrrowl in the South Division, and the Cincinnati Cyclones were re-added to the North Division.

== Regular season ==
=== Final standings ===
Note: GP = Games played; W = Wins; L= Losses; OTL = Overtime Losses; SOL = Shootout Losses; GF = Goals for; GA = Goals against; Pts = Points; Green shade = Clinched playoff spot; Blue shade = Clinched division; (z) = Clinched home-ice advantage

==== American Conference ====
North Division	GP	W	L	OTL	SOL	Pts	GF	GA
Dayton Bombers (CBJ)	72	37	26	2	7	83	213	191
Toledo Storm (DET/CHI)	72	39	30	1	2	81	211	220
Cincinnati Cyclones (MTL)	72	37	29	4	2	80	213	198
Trenton Titans (PHI)	72	36	31	1	4	77	250	242
Johnstown Chiefs (TBL)	72	33	33	3	3	72	216	232
Reading Royals (LAK)	72	32	33	2	5	71	221	235
Wheeling Nailers (PIT)	72	32	34	2	4	70	215	255

Southern Division	GP	W	L	OTL	SOL	Pts	GF	GA
Florida Everblades (CAR/FLA) (z)	72	44	22	4	2	94	272	212
Texas Wildcatters (Independent)	72	41	22	5	4	91	265	222
Gwinnett Gladiators (ATL)	72	41	24	5	2	89	289	256
Charlotte Checkers (NYR)	72	42	27	1	2	87	252	220
Augusta Lynx (ANA)	72	39	29	1	3	82	258	265
South Carolina Stingrays (WAS)	72	36	27	4	5	81	250	251
Columbia Inferno (TOR)	72	29	34	4	5	67	217	256
Pensacola Ice Pilots (NYI)	72	20	46	2	4	46	233	318

==== National Conference ====
Pacific Division	GP	W	L	OTL	SOL	Pts	GF	GA
Las Vegas Wranglers (CGY) (z)	72	46	12	6	8	106	231	187
Bakersfield Condors (Independent)	72	41	19	3	9	94	270	236
Stockton Thunder (EDM)	72	38	24	5	5	86	225	197
Fresno Falcons (SJS)	72	34	29	5	4	77	195	197
Long Beach Ice Dogs (BOS)	72	27	42	0	3	57	209	267

West Division	GP	W	L	OTL	SOL	Pts	GF	GA
Alaska Aces (STL)	72	49	16	3	4	105	270	176
Idaho Steelheads (DAL)	72	42	24	2	4	90	240	208
Victoria Salmon Kings (VAN)	72	36	32	1	3	76	239	249
Phoenix RoadRunners (PHX)	72	27	40	2	3	59	201	255
Utah Grizzlies (Independent)	72	22	42	4	4	52	184	294

=== Scoring leaders ===
Note: GP = Games played; G = Goals; A = Assists; Pts = Points; PIM = Penalty minutes

Player	Team	GP	G	A	Pts	PIM
Brad Schell	Gwinnett Gladiators	63	25	85	110	60
Scott Mifsud	Gwinnett Gladiators	70	26	68	94	66
Yannick Tifu	Phoenix RoadRunners/Dayton Bombers	78	28	61	89	104
Marty Flichel	Idaho Steelheads	70	39	49	88	95
Kevin Baker	Texas Wildcatters	62	36	45	81	76
Derek Nesbitt	Idaho Steelheads	66	30	51	81	32
Kimbi Daniels	Alaska Aces	70	18	63	81	128
Mark Lee	Charlotte Checkers	59	26	54	80	64
Scott Bertoli	Trenton Titans	64	31	48	79	118
Mike Bayrack	Texas Wildcatters	66	33	45	78	71

Data referenced from ECHL website

=== Leading goaltenders ===
Note: GP = Games played; Min = Minutes played; W = Wins; L = Losses; OTL = Overtime losses; SOL = Shootout losses; GA = Goals against; SO = Shutouts; SV% = Save percentage; GAA = Goals against average

Player	Team	GP	Min	W	L	OTL	SOL	GA	SO	SV%	GAA
Mike McKenna	Las Vegas Wranglers	38	2258	27	4	2	5	83	5	.927	2.21
Derek Gustafson	Alaska Aces	43	2536	29	11	2	1	100	5	.918	2.37
Adam Berkhoel	Dayton Bombers	43	2584	23	17	0	3	105	5	.910	2.44
Ryan MacDonald	Fresno Falcons	39	2134	16	14	5	1	88	1	.924	2.47
Cedrick Desjardins	Cincinnati Cyclones	44	2648	24	19	1	0	112	4	.917	2.54

Data referenced from ECHL website

== Kelly Cup playoffs ==
=== Format ===
The two unbalanced conferences had separate playoff formats. The 10-team National Conference had the top eight teams advance to the playoffs with the division winners awarded the first and second seeds. The remaining six teams were seeded by points and the four highest seeds faced the lowest remaining seeds. The four remaining teams in the second round would be reseeded by regular season points and the winners would play for a conference championship. All playoff series were best-of-seven. The 15-team American Conference had 10 teams advance to the playoffs but kept an inter-divisional playoff structure. The fourth and fifth seeded teams in each division had a play-in best-of-three series before moving on to the divisional semifinals which were a best-of-five series. The divisional and conference finals were a best-of-seven series. The two conference champions then met in a best-of-seven Kelly Cup final series.

=== National ===
Conference Quarterfinals; April 9–21
1	Las Vegas	4
8	Phoenix	0
4	Idaho	4
5	Stockton	2
3	Bakersfield	4
6	Fresno	2
2	Alaska	4
7	Victoria	2

Conference Semifinals; April 23 – May 5
1	Las Vegas	2
4	Idaho	4
3	Bakersfield	0
2	Alaska	4

Conference Finals; May 7–19
4	Idaho	4
2	Alaska	1

==== National quarterfinals ====
Las Vegas (1) vs. Phoenix (8)
Date	Away	Home	
April 10	Las Vegas 5	1 Phoenix	
April 12	Las Vegas 3	2 Phoenix	
April 13	Phoenix 4	5 Las Vegas	OT
April 14	Phoenix 2	3 Las Vegas	
Las Vegas wins best-of-seven series 4–0

Alaska (2) vs. Victoria (7)
Date	Away	Home
April 9	Victoria 3	2 Alaska
April 10	Victoria 1	7 Alaska
April 12	Alaska 5	2 Victoria
April 13	Alaska 5	2 Victoria
April 14	Alaska 4	9 Victoria
April 16	Victoria 2	5 Alaska
Alaska wins best-of-seven series 4–2

Bakersfield (3) vs. Fresno (6)
Date	Away	Home
April 10	Fresno 7	3 Bakersfield
April 12	Bakersfield 3	9 Fresno
April 13	Fresno 2	4 Bakersfield
April 15	Bakersfield 6	2 Fresno
April 16	Bakersfield 4	2 Fresno
April 19	Fresno 0	4 Bakersfield
Bakersfield wins best-of-seven series 4–2

Idaho (4) vs. Stockton (5)
Date	Away	Home	
April 10	Stockton 4	2 Idaho	
April 11	Stockton 0	3 Idaho	
April 13	Idaho 2	1 Stockton	2OT
April 15	Idaho 2	3 Stockton	
April 16	Idaho 3	2 Stockton	OT
April 18	Stockton 1	6 Idaho	
Idaho wins best-of-seven series 4–2

==== National semifinals ====
Las Vegas (1) vs. Idaho (4)
Date	Away	Home
April 22	Las Vegas 2	1 Idaho
April 23	Las Vegas 1	4 Idaho
April 25	Idaho 4	2 Las Vegas
April 26	Idaho 4	3 Las Vegas
April 27	Idaho 0	4 Las Vegas
April 29	Las Vegas 0	1 Idaho
Idaho wins best-of-seven series 4–2

Alaska (2) vs. Bakersfield (3)
Date	Away	Home	
April 23	Bakersfield 0	6 Alaska	
April 25	Bakersfield 2	3 Alaska	
April 27	Alaska 1	0 Bakersfield	OT
April 28	Alaska 3	1 Bakersfield	
Alaska wins best-of-seven series 4–0

==== National finals ====
Alaska (2) vs. Idaho (4)
Date	Away	Home	
May 7	Idaho 1	0 Alaska	
May 8	Idaho 3	2 Alaska	OT
May 11	Alaska 5	2 Idaho	
May 13	Alaska 2	7 Idaho	
May 15	Alaska 2	3 Idaho	
Idaho wins best-of-seven series 4–1

=== American ===
Divisional Quarterfinals; April 8–12
N4	Trenton	2
N5	Johnstown	0
S4	Charlotte	2
S5	Augusta	0

Divisional Semifinals; April 13–22
N1	Dayton	3
N4	Trenton	0
N2	Toledo	0
N3	Cincinnati	3
S2	Texas	3
S3	Gwinnett	1
S1	Florida	3
S4	Charlotte	0

Divisional Finals; April 23 – May 5
N1	Dayton	4
N3	Cincinnati	3
S2	Texas	2
S1	Florida	4

Conference Finals; May 7–19
N1	Dayton	4
S1	Florida	3

==== American Divisional quarterfinals ====
North Division quarterfinals
Trenton (4) vs. Johnstown (5)
Date	Away	Home
April 9	Johnstown 2	4 Trenton
April 10	Trenton 7	5 Johnstown
Trenton wins best-of-three series 2–0

South Division quarterfinals
Charlotte (4) vs. Augusta (5)
Date	Away	Home	
April 9	Augusta 1	2 Charlotte	OT
April 10	Charlotte 3	2 Augusta	OT
Charlotte wins best-of-three series 2–0

==== American Divisional semifinals ====
North Division semifinals
Dayton (1) vs. Trenton (4)
Date	Away	Home
April 15	Trenton 3	6 Dayton
April 16	Trenton 0	1 Dayton
April 19	Dayton 1	0 Trenton
Dayton wins best-of-five series 3–0

South Division semifinals
Florida (1) vs. Charlotte (4)
Date	Away	Home
April 13	Charlotte 2	3 Florida
April 14	Charlotte 2	7 Florida
April 17	Florida 4	0 Charlotte
Florida wins the best-of-five series 3–0

North Division semifinals
Toledo (2) vs. Cincinnati (3)
Date	Away	Home
April 13	Cincinnati 3	1 Toledo
April 14	Cincinnati 7	3 Toledo
April 19	Toledo 0	4 Cincinnati
Cincinnati wins best-of-five series 3–0

South Division semifinals
Texas (2) vs. Gwinnett (3)
Date	Away	Home	
April 14	Texas 2	5 Gwinnett	
April 15	Texas 5	2 Gwinnett	
April 18	Gwinnett 4	5 Texas	OT
April 20	Gwinnett 1	2 Texas	OT
Texas wins best-of-five series 3–1

==== American Divisional finals ====
North Division Finals
Dayton (1) vs. Cincinnati (3)
Date	Away	Home
April 22	Cincinnati 5	4 Dayton
April 25	Cincinnati 1	0 Dayton
April 27	Dayton 4	3 Cincinnati
April 28	Dayton 3	5 Cincinnati
April 30	Dayton 6	2 Cincinnati
May 2	Cincinnati 0	3 Dayton
May 3	Cincinnati 3	5 Dayton
Dayton wins best-of-seven series 4–3

South Division Finals
Florida (1) vs. Texas (2)
Date	Away	Home	
April 24	Texas 0	5 Florida	
April 25	Texas 5	0 Florida	
April 27	Florida 5	2 Texas	
April 28	Florida 1	3 Texas	
April 30	Florida 4	2 Texas	
May 4	Texas 3	4 Florida	OT
Florida wins best-of-seven series 4–2

==== American Conference finals ====
American Conference finals
Dayton (No.1) vs. Florida (So.1)
Date	Away	Home	
May 8	Dayton 4	3 Florida	3OT
May 10	Dayton 3	5 Florida	
May 12	Florida 4	3 Dayton	
May 13	Florida 1	3 Dayton	
May 15	Florida 2	4 Dayton	
May 17	Dayton 3	6 Florida	
May 18	Dayton 3	Florida 1	
Dayton wins best-of-seven series 4–3

=== Kelly Cup finals ===
Dayton (No. 1) vs. Idaho (Na. 4)
Date	Away	Home	
May 23	Dayton 2	1 Idaho	
May 25	Dayton 2	5 Idaho	
May 27	Idaho 4	2 Dayton	
May 29	Idaho 2	1 Dayton	2OT
May 31	Idaho 4	1 Dayton	
Idaho wins best-of-seven series 4–1

Playoff tables referenced from ECHL website.

== ECHL awards ==
Patrick Kelly Cup:	Idaho Steelheads
Henry Brabham Cup:	Las Vegas Wranglers
Gingher Memorial Trophy:	Dayton Bombers
Bruce Taylor Trophy:	Idaho Steelheads
John Brophy Award:	Davis Payne (Alaska)
CCM Vector Most Valuable Player:	Brad Schell (Gwinnett)
Kelly Cup Playoffs Most Valuable Player:	Steve Silverthorn (Idaho)
Reebok Hockey Goaltender of the Year:	Adam Berkhoel (Dayton)
CCM Tacks Rookie of the Year:	Colton Fretter (Gwinnett)
Defenseman of the Year:	Jon Awe (Gwinnett)
Leading Scorer:	Brad Schell (Gwinnett)
Reebok Hockey Plus Performer Award:	Matt Shasby (Alaska)
Sportsmanship Award:	Derek Nesbitt (Idaho)

== See also ==
- ECHL All-Star Game
- List of ECHL seasons
- 2006 in ice hockey
- 2007 in ice hockey

Preceded by 2006 Kelly Cup playoffs	Kelly Cup Playoffs; 2007	Succeeded by 2008 Kelly Cup playoffs
