= 2002–03 ECHL season =

Ice hockey league season

- League: East Coast Hockey League
- Sport: Ice hockey

Regular season
- Brabham Cup: Toledo Storm
- Season MVP: Bud Smith (Arkansas)
- Top scorer: Bud Smith (Arkansas)

Playoffs
- Northern champions: Atlantic City Boardwalk Bullies
- Northern runners-up: Cincinnati Cyclones
- Southern champions: Columbia Inferno
- Southern runners-up: Mississippi Sea Wolves
- Playoffs MVP: Kevin Colley (Atlantic City)

Finals
- Champions: Atlantic City Boardwalk Bullies
- Runners-up: Columbia Inferno

ECHL seasons
- ← 2001–02 2003–04 →

The 2002–03 ECHL season was the 15th season of the East Coast Hockey League. The Brabham Cup regular season champions were the Toledo Storm and the Kelly Cup playoff champions were the Atlantic City Boardwalk Bullies.

== League changes ==
The Macon Whoopee relocated to Lexington, Kentucky, as the Lexington Men O' War.

The New Orleans Brass ceased operations due to the arrival of the New Orleans Hornets basketball team. The NBA team moved into the Brass' arena but wanted the Brass to pay for every conversion between the hockey and basketball configuration, an expense the Brass could not afford.

The Mobile Mysticks also suspended operations prior to the season and would relocate to Duluth, Georgia, beginning with the 2003–04 season.

== All-Star Game ==
The ECHL All-Star Game was held at Germain Arena in Estero, Florida and was hosted by the Florida Everblades. The Northern Conference All-Stars dominated the game, beating the Southern Conference All-Stars 8–2. Atlantic City's Scott Stirling was named Most Valuable Player.

== Regular season ==
=== Final standings ===
Note: GP = Games played; W = Wins; L= Losses; SOL = Shootout losses; GF = Goals for; GA = Goals against; Pts = Points
Green shade = Clinched playoff spot; Blue shade = Clinched division; (z) = Clinched home-ice advantage

==== Northern Conference ====
Northeast Division	GP	W	L	SOL	Pts	GF	GA
Atlantic City Boardwalk Bullies	72	41	19	12	94	268	224
Greensboro Generals	72	42	21	9	93	235	211
Roanoke Express	72	42	24	6	90	265	239
Trenton Titans	72	38	24	10	86	229	207
Charlotte Checkers	72	41	28	3	85	262	234
Richmond Renegades	72	35	31	6	76	240	239
Reading Royals	72	32	35	5	69	261	303

Northwest Division	GP	W	L	SOL	Pts	GF	GA
Toledo Storm (z)	72	47	15	10	104	247	196
Peoria Rivermen	72	48	17	7	103	241	181
Cincinnati Cyclones	72	36	29	7	79	257	236
Lexington Men O' War	72	34	31	7	75	188	212
Johnstown Chiefs	72	28	33	11	67	214	243
Wheeling Nailers	72	28	41	3	59	193	261
Dayton Bombers	72	24	38	10	58	191	247

==== Southern Conference ====
Southeast Division	GP	W	L	SOL	Pts	GF	GA
Columbia Inferno (z)	72	47	23	2	96	265	202
South Carolina Stingrays	72	42	22	8	92	248	225
Pee Dee Pride	72	40	26	6	86	244	213
Florida Everblades	72	35	23	14	84	239	243
Greenville Grrrowl	72	28	36	8	64	217	262
Augusta Lynx	72	27	39	6	60	203	256
Columbus Cottonmouths	72	25	39	8	58	197	270

Southwest Division	GP	W	L	SOL	Pts	GF	GA
Mississippi Sea Wolves	72	44	24	4	92	250	211
Louisiana IceGators	72	40	20	12	92	249	210
Arkansas RiverBlades	72	37	24	11	85	238	236
Jackson Bandits	72	38	26	8	84	210	195
Pensacola Ice Pilots	72	33	30	9	75	228	241
Baton Rouge Kingfish	72	20	43	9	49	184	266

== Kelly Cup playoffs ==
=== Northern Conference ===
Divisional Semifinals; April 2–8
NE1	Atlantic City	3
NE4	Trenton	0
NE2	Greensboro	3
NE3	Roanoke	1
NW2	Peoria	1
NW3	Cincinnati	3
NW1	Toledo	3
NW4	Lexington	0

Division Finals; April 11–18
NE1	Atlantic City	3
NE2	Greensboro	1
NW1	Toledo	1
NW3	Cincinnati	3

Conference Finals; April 23-May 3
NE1	Atlantic City	4
NW3	Cincinnati	3

==== Division semifinals ====
Northeast Division Semifinals Atlantic City vs. Trenton
Date	Away	Home
April 2	Trenton 3	Atlantic City 4
April 4	Trenton 0	Atlantic City 4
April 7	Atlantic City 7	Trenton 3
Atlantic City wins series 3–0

Northeast Division Semifinals Greensboro vs. Roanoke
Date	Away	Home
April 3	Roanoke 2	Greensboro 7
April 4	Roanoke 3	Greensboro 1
April 5	Greensboro 3	Roanoke 2
April 8	Greensboro 5	Roanoke 3
Greensboro wins series 3–1

Northwest Division Semifinals Toledo vs. Lexington
Date	Away	Home
April 2	Lexington 1	Toledo 9
April 4	Lexington 0	Toledo 3
April 5	Lexington 1	Toledo 5
Toledo wins series 3–0

Northwest Division Semifinals Peoria vs. Cincinnati
Date	Away	Home	
April 1	Cincinnati 4	Peoria 3	
April 2	Cincinnati 1	Peoria 2	OT
April 5	Peoria 0	Cincinnati 1	OT
April 6	Peoria 3	Cincinnati 4	2OT
Cincinnati wins series 3–1

==== Division finals ====
Northeast Division Finals Atlantic City vs. Greensboro
Date	Away	Home	
April 11	Greensboro 2	Atlantic City 3	OT
April 12	Greensboro 3	Atlantic City 2	OT
April 16	Atlantic City 6	Greensboro 3	
April 18	Atlantic City 3	Greensboro 2	
Atlantic City wins series 3–1

Northwest Division Finals Toledo vs. Cincinnati
Date	Away	Home
April 11	Cincinnati 2	Toledo 1
April 12	Cincinnati 4	Toledo 2
April 15	Toledo 1	Cincinnati 0
April 16	Toledo 1	Cincinnati 4
Cincinnati wins series 3–1

==== Conference finals ====
Northern Conference Finals Atlantic City vs. Cincinnati
Date	Away	Home
April 23	Cincinnati 4	Atlantic City 5
April 25	Cincinnati 0	Atlantic City 5
April 26	Atlantic City 3	Cincinnati 1
April 28	Atlantic City 1	Cincinnati 3
April 29	Atlantic City 3	Cincinnati 6
May 2	Cincinnati 4	Atlantic City 3
May 3	Cincinnati 2	Atlantic City 3
Atlantic City wins series 4–3 and Gingher Memorial Trophy

=== Southern Conference ===
Divisional Wildcards; April 1
SE4	Florida	0
SE5	Greenville	1
SW4	Jackson	0
SW5	Pensacola	1

Divisional Semifinals; April 2–7
SE1	Columbia	3
SE5	Greenville	0
SE2	South Carolina	1
SE3	Pee Dee	3
SW2	Louisiana	3
SW3	Arkansas	0
SW1	Mississippi	3
SW5	Pensacola	0

Divisional Finals; April 9–16
SE1	Columbia	3
SE3	Pee Dee	0
SW2	Louisiana	0
SW1	Mississippi	3

Conference Finals; April 23-May 2
SE1	Columbia	4
SW1	Mississippi	2

==== 1st round ====
Southeast Division Wildcard Florida vs. Greenville: Date / Away / Home; April 1 / Greenville 3 / Florida 2; Greenville wins series 1–0	Southwest Division Wildcard Jackson vs. Pensacola: Date / Away / Home; April 1 / Pensacola 3 / Jackson 2 / OT; Pensacola wins series 1–0

==== Division Semifinals ====
Southeast Division Semifinals Columbia vs. Greenville
Date	Away	Home
April 2	Greenville 2	Columbia 6
April 4	Greenville 4	Columbia 6
April 7	Columbia 6	Greenville 4
Columbia wins series 3–0

Southeast Division Semifinals South Carolina vs. Pee Dee
Date	Away	Home	
April 2	Pee Dee 3	South Carolina 0	
April 4	Pee Dee 1	South Carolina 7	
April 5	South Carolina 3	Pee Dee 4	
April 7	South Carolina 3	Pee Dee 4	OT
Pee Dee wins series 3–1

Southwest Division Semifinals Mississippi vs. Pensacola
Date	Away	Home
April 2	Pensacola 1	Mississippi 5
April 4	Pensacola 1	Mississippi 5
April 5	Mississippi 5	Pensacola 1
Mississippi wins series 3–0

Southwest Division Semifinals Louisiana vs. Arkansas
Date	Away	Home
April 2	Arkansas 0	Louisiana 2
April 3	Arkansas 1	Louisiana 2
April 5	Louisiana 3	Arkansas 1
Louisiana wins series 3–0

==== Division finals ====
Southeast Division Finals Columbia vs. Pee Dee
Date	Away	Home
April 11	Pee Dee 2	Columbia 5
April 12	Pee Dee 1	Columbia 2
April 16	Columbia 5	Pee Dee 1
Columbia wins series 3–0

Southwest Division Finals Mississippi vs. Louisiana
Date	Away	Home
April 9	Louisiana 2	Mississippi 5
April 12	Mississippi 4	Louisiana 0
April 14	Louisiana 2	Mississippi 3
Mississippi wins series 3–0

==== Conference finals ====
Southern Conference Finals Columbia vs. Mississippi
Date	Away	Home	
April 23	Mississippi 2	Columbia 5	
April 25	Mississippi 2	Columbia 3	OT
April 27	Columbia 4	Mississippi 3	
April 28	Columbia 1	Mississippi 3	
April 30	Columbia 1	Mississippi 2	OT
May 2	Mississippi 2	Columbia 4	
Columbia wins series 4–2 and Bruce Taylor Trophy

=== Kelly Cup finals ===
Columbia vs. Atlantic City
Date	Away	Home
May 7	Atlantic City 1	Columbia 0
May 9	Atlantic City 3	Columbia 0
May 10	Columbia 5	Atlantic City 3
May 12	Columbia 1	Atlantic City 3
May 14	Columbia 1	Atlantic City 3
Atlantic City wins series 4–1 and Kelly Cup

== ECHL awards ==
Patrick Kelly Cup:	Atlantic City Boardwalk Bullies
Henry Brabham Cup:	Toledo Storm
Gingher Memorial Trophy:	Atlantic City Boardwalk Bullies
Bruce Taylor Trophy:	Columbia Inferno
John Brophy Award:	Claude Noel (Toledo)
CCM TACKS Most Valuable Player:	Bud Smith (Arkansas)
Kelly Cup Playoffs Most Valuable Player:	Kevin Colley (Atlantic City)
Reebok Hockey Goaltender of the Year:	Alfie Michaud (Peoria)
CCM Tacks Rookie of the Year:	Jason Jaffray (Roanoke)
Defenseman of the Year:	Jim Baxter (Mississippi)
Leading Scorer:	Bud Smith (Arkansas)
Reebok Hockey Plus Performer Award:	Dennis Vial (Columbia); Mike Glumac (Pee Dee)
Sportsmanship Award:	Rejean Stringer (Columbia)

== See also ==
- List of ECHL seasons
- 2002 in sports
- 2003 in sports
