= Peoria Rivermen (ECHL) =

Defunct minor professional ice hockey team

- City: Peoria, Illinois
- League: ECHL
- Operated: 1996–2005
- Home arena: Carver Arena
- Colors: Blue, red, yellow

Championships
- Division titles: 3 (1997–98, 1999–00, 2000–01)
- Conference titles: 1 (1999–00)
- Kelly Cups: 1 (1999–00)

The Peoria Rivermen were a professional ice hockey team in the ECHL. They played in Peoria, Illinois, United States, at the Carver Arena. The team replaced a team of the same name that had played in the higher budget International Hockey League since 1984 after several seasons of financial losses. In 2005, ownership obtained a franchise in the American Hockey League.

== History ==
=== Season-by-season results ===
| Season | Games | Won | Lost | OTL | SOL | Points | Goals for | Goals against | Standing | Playoffs |
|---|---|---|---|---|---|---|---|---|---|---|
| 1996–97 | 70 | 43 | 21 | 0 | 6 | 92 | 308 | 219 | 2nd, North | Lost in round 3 |
| 1997–98 | 70 | 44 | 19 | 0 | 7 | 95 | 296 | 213 | 1st, Northwest | Lost in round 1 |
| 1998–99 | 70 | 39 | 25 | 0 | 6 | 84 | 243 | 230 | 2nd, Northwest | Lost in round 2 |
| 1999–00 | 70 | 45 | 20 | 0 | 5 | 95 | 273 | 216 | 1st, Northwest | Won Championship |
| 2000–01 | 72 | 45 | 17 | 0 | 10 | 100 | 238 | 182 | 1st, Northwest | Lost in round 4 |
| 2001–02 | 72 | 41 | 23 | 0 | 8 | 90 | 206 | 179 | 2nd, Northwest | Lost in round 2 |
| 2002–03 | 72 | 48 | 17 | 0 | 7 | 103 | 241 | 181 | 2nd, Northwest | Lost in round 1 |
| 2003–04 | 72 | 45 | 18 | 0 | 9 | 99 | 244 | 177 | 3rd, Northern | Lost in round 2 |
| 2004–05 | 72 | 38 | 26 | 2 | 6 | 84 | 213 | 177 | 5th, North | Did not qualify |

== Team records ==
Goals: 42 Tyler Rennette (2002–03)
Assists: 74 Jean-Guy Trudel (1997–98)
Points: 113 Jean-Guy Trudel (1997–98)
Penalty minutes: 318 Ken Boone (1998–99)
GAA (min. 20 games): 1.91 Curtis Sanford (2000–01)
SV%: (min. 20 games): .929 Alfie Michaud (2004–05)
Career goals: 119 Tyler Rennette
Career assists: 163 Joe Rybar
Career points: 243 Joe Rybar
Career penalty minutes: 986 Trevor Baker
Career goaltending wins: 47 Alfie Michaud
Career shutouts: 7 Alfie Michaud
Career games: 341 Dan Hodge

| Preceded by Mississippi Sea Wolves | Kelly Cup Champions; 1999–2000 | Succeeded by South Carolina Stingrays |
