= Kelly Cup =

ECHL playoff championship trophy

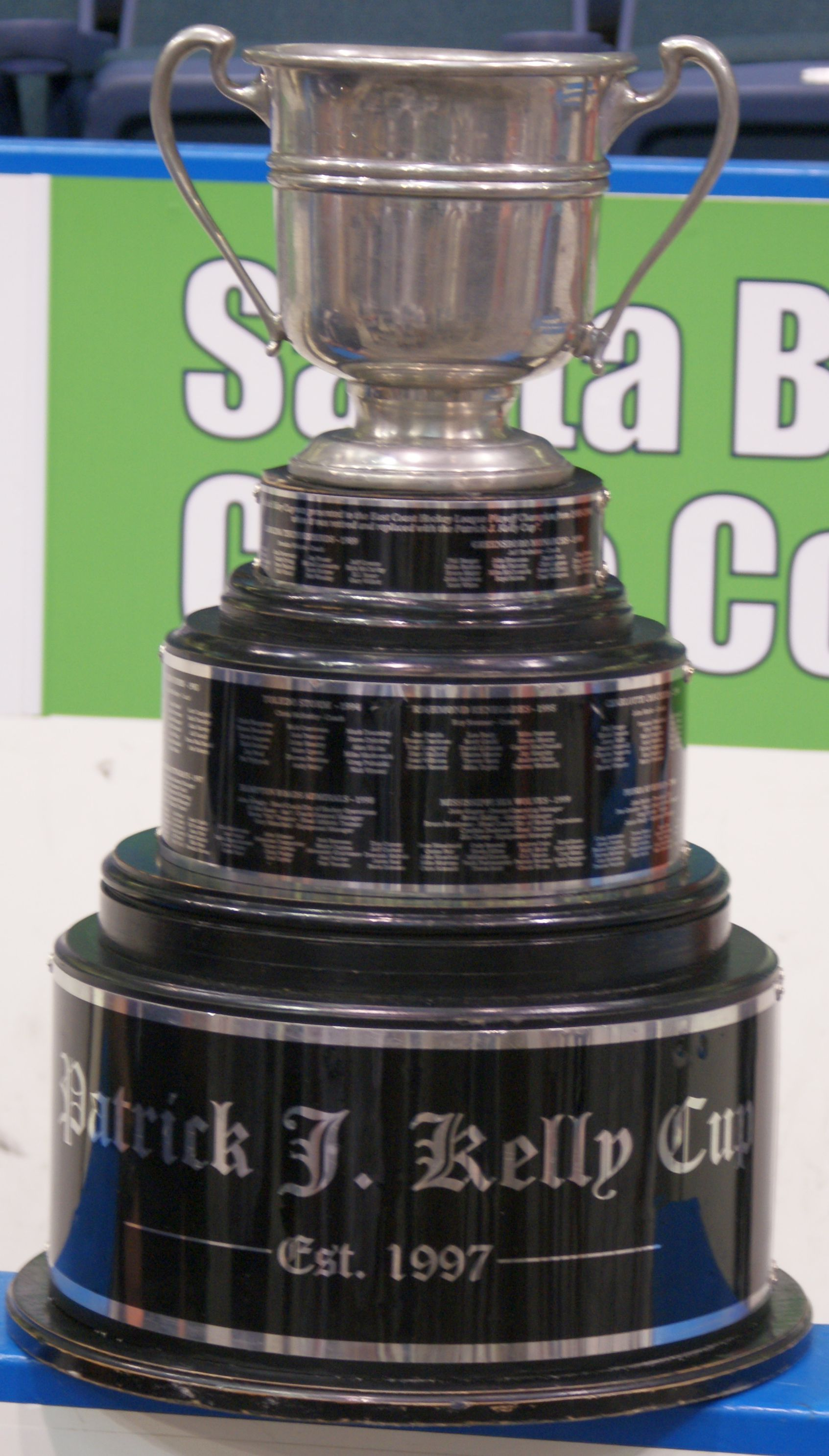
- Sport: Ice hockey
- Competition: ECHL
- Awarded for: Playoff champions
- Sponsored by: FLOHOCKEY

History
- First award: 1997; 29 years ago
- First winner: South Carolina Stingrays
- Most wins: Florida Everblades (5 titles)
- Most recent: Florida Everblades
- Website: List of winners

Riley Cup
- Sport: Ice hockey
- Competition: ECHL
- Awarded for: Playoff champions

History
- First award: 1989
- Final award: 1996
- First winner: Carolina Thunderbirds
- Most recent: Charlotte Checkers

The Patrick J. Kelly Cup goes to the playoff champion of the ECHL. The Kelly Cup has been awarded to teams since 1997. Prior to 1997, the playoff winner was awarded the Riley Cup, named after former International Hockey League president Jack Riley. The current cup is named after Patrick J. Kelly, the league's first commissioner. The cup is loaned to the winning team for one year and is returned at the start of the following year's playoffs, although the trophy itself has been replaced three times with the first two iterations preserved in the Hockey Hall of Fame. The Kelly Cup Playoffs Most Valuable Player award is also given out as part of the Kelly Cup Championship ceremonies. Nick Vitucci, Dave Gagnon and Cam Johnson are the only players to win the award on multiple occasions, with Johnson the only player to win the award in consecutive years.

Nineteen different teams have won the ECHL Championship, with nine (Alaska, Allen, Cincinnati, Colorado, Florida, Hampton Roads, Idaho, South Carolina, and Toledo) winning multiple times. The Florida Everblades hold the record for most championships won with five. The Colorado Eagles, who won it in 2018 for their second consecutive title, moved to the American Hockey League in 2018–19. In 2019, the Eagles' ownership did not return the Kelly Cup to the ECHL before the playoffs, leading to the league creating a replacement trophy for the 2019 Kelly Cup playoffs. The Eagles' ownership eventually returned the cup before the 2019–20 season, and the league returned its status to be the primary trophy. The 2019 Kelly Cup was the fourth copy of the trophy, but was allowed to be kept by the Newfoundland Growlers when the previous cup returned to circulation.

On one occasions an ECHL club has won the Kelly Cup coincidentally with its NHL affiliate winning the Stanley Cup: 2024 when the Florida Panthers and their ECHL affiliate, the Florida Everblades both won. This also occurred with its AHL affiliate winning the Calder Cup in 2009 when the Hershey Bears and their ECHL affiliate, the South Carolina Stingrays both won.

== Playoff format ==
The Kelly Cup playoffs is an elimination tournament, consisting of four rounds of a best-of-seven series. The format has changed often throughout the years. Since 2016–17, the top four point earners from each division qualify. The first two playoff rounds are played within each division, followed by the conference finals (contested between the four division winners), and ending with the Kelly Cup finals (featuring the two conference champions).

== List of ECHL champions ==
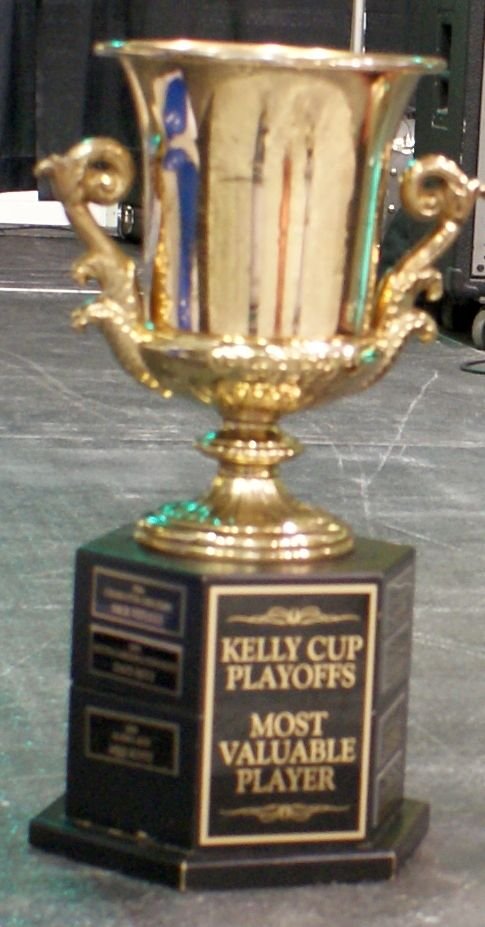
The Kelly Cup MVP Trophy

Season	Winning team	Score	Losing team	June M. Kelly MVP
1989	Carolina Thunderbirds (1)	4–3	Johnstown Chiefs	Nick Vitucci
1990	Greensboro Monarchs (1)	4–1	Winston-Salem Thunderbirds	Wade Flaherty
1991	Hampton Roads Admirals (1)	4–1	Greensboro Monarchs	Dave Flanagan; Dave Gagnon
1992	Hampton Roads Admirals (2)	4–0	Louisville Icehawks	Mark Bernard
1993	Toledo Storm (1)	4–2	Wheeling Thunderbirds	Rick Judson
1994	Toledo Storm (2)	4–1	Raleigh IceCaps	Dave Gagnon (2)
1995	Richmond Renegades (1)	4–1	Greensboro Monarchs	Blaine Moore
1996	Charlotte Checkers (1)	4–0	Jacksonville Lizard Kings	Nick Vitucci (2)
1997	South Carolina Stingrays (1)	4–1	Louisiana IceGators	Jason Fitzsimmons
1998	Hampton Roads Admirals (3)	4–2	Pensacola Ice Pilots	Sebastien Charpentier
1999	Mississippi Sea Wolves (1)	4–3	Richmond Renegades	Travis Scott
2000	Peoria Rivermen (1)	4–2	Louisiana IceGators	J. F. Boutin; Jason Christie
2001	South Carolina Stingrays (2)	4–1	Trenton Titans	Dave Seitz
2002	Greenville Grrrowl (1)	4–0	Dayton Bombers	Simon Gamache; Tyrone Garner
2003	Atlantic City Boardwalk Bullies (1)	4–1	Columbia Inferno	Kevin Colley
2004	Idaho Steelheads (1)	4–1	Florida Everblades	Dan Ellis
2005	Trenton Titans (1)	4–2	Florida Everblades	Leon Hayward
2006	Alaska Aces (1)	4–1	Gwinnett Gladiators	Mike Scott
2007	Idaho Steelheads (2)	4–1	Dayton Bombers	Steve Silverthorn
2008	Cincinnati Cyclones (1)	4–2	Las Vegas Wranglers	Cedrick Desjardins
2009	South Carolina Stingrays (3)	4–3	Alaska Aces	James Reimer
2010	Cincinnati Cyclones (2)	4–1	Idaho Steelheads	Robert Mayer; Jeremy Smith
2011	Alaska Aces (2)	4–1	Kalamazoo Wings	Scott Howes
2012	Florida Everblades (1)	4–1	Las Vegas Wranglers	John Muse
2013	Reading Royals (1)	4–1	Stockton Thunder	Riley Gill
2014	Alaska Aces (3)	4–2	Cincinnati Cyclones	Rob Madore (Note: MVP was a member of the defeated team in the Kelly Cup Finals)
2015	Allen Americans (1)	4–3	South Carolina Stingrays	Greger Hanson
2016	Allen Americans (2)	4–2	Wheeling Nailers	Chad Costello
2017	Colorado Eagles (1)	4–0	South Carolina Stingrays	Matt Register
2018	Colorado Eagles (2)	4–3	Florida Everblades	Michael Joly
2019	Newfoundland Growlers (1)	4–2	Toledo Walleye	Zach O'Brien
2020	Season cancelled due to the COVID-19 pandemic			
2021	Fort Wayne Komets (1)	3–1	South Carolina Stingrays	Stephen Harper
2022	Florida Everblades (2)	4–1	Toledo Walleye	Cam Johnson
2023	Florida Everblades (3)	4–0	Idaho Steelheads	Cam Johnson (2)
2024	Florida Everblades (4)	4–1	Kansas City Mavericks	Oliver Chau
2025	Trois-Rivières Lions (1)	4–1	Toledo Walleye	Luke Cavallin
2026	Florida Everblades (5)	4–2	Kansas City Mavericks	Cam Johnson (3)

== See also ==
- ECHL awards
