= Atlantic City Boardwalk Bullies =

- City: Atlantic City, New Jersey
- League: ECHL
- Founded: 1990
- Operated: 2001–2005
- Home arena: Boardwalk Hall

Franchise history
- 1990–1992: Cincinnati Cyclones
- 1992–2001: Birmingham Bulls
- 2001–2005: Atlantic City Boardwalk Bullies
- 2005–2015: Stockton Thunder
- 2015–present: Adirondack Thunder

Championships
- Conference titles: 2002–03
- Kelly Cups: 2002–03

The Atlantic City Boardwalk Bullies were an ECHL hockey team in Atlantic City, New Jersey from 2001 to 2005. The team's venue was the historic Boardwalk Hall, which seats 6,979.

In 2001, the franchise played its inaugural season in Atlantic City after relocating from Birmingham, Alabama, where it was known as the Birmingham Bulls. In 2003, the team won the Kelly Cup, beating the Columbia Inferno in the finals. They also qualified for the playoffs, and earned at least 90 (with no less than 92 to be exact) points in the standings during each of their four seasons Atlantic City. Their biggest rivals were the in-state Trenton Titans, whom they met three times in the postseason (with every series between the two teams ending in a sweep, as the Boardwalk Bullies would win the first two, while the Titans emerged victorious during the third and final playoff matchup), while annually competing for the Garden State Cup, which would be awarded to whatever team in between the two that won the regular season series. Former Boardwalk Bullies, and Titans head coach Mike Haviland would also coach the victor of the three playoff matchups between the two clubs, while also never losing a postseason game in the process all three times the Boardwalk Bullies & Titans competed against each-other during postseason play.

Even though the Bullies found success on the ice, the team's attendance was poor. In its championship season, attendance averaged slightly above 3,000 per game. The attendance would also drop to an all time low, slightly below an average of 2500 in their fourth, and final season. During the 2005 season, the franchise was sold to an ownership group from Stockton, California. The team moved and was renamed the Stockton Thunder for the 2005–06 season until the end of the 2014–15 season. Before the 2015–16 season the franchise relocated again to Glens Falls, New York to play as the Adirondack Thunder.

Preceded by Greenville Grrrowl	Kelly Cup Champions; 2002–03	Succeeded by Idaho Steelheads
