= 2009 Kelly Cup playoffs =

Tournament details
- Dates: April 9–June 5, 2009
- Teams: 16

Final positions
- Champions: South Carolina Stingrays
- Runners-up: Alaska Aces

Tournament statistics
- Scoring leader(s): Josh Soares (Alaska) (27 points)

Awards
- MVP: James Reimer (South Carolina)

The 2009 Kelly Cup Playoffs of the ECHL began on April 9, 2009. The 16 teams that qualified, eight from each conference, played a best-of-7 series for division semifinals, finals and conference finals. The conference champions played a best-of-7 series for the Kelly Cup.

Three league records were set during the first round of the playoffs. Game One of the North Division semifinals became the longest game in ECHL history, as the Elmira Jackals defeated the Trenton Devils 5 – 4 in a game that lasted 126:10. Elmira's Josh Aspenlind scored the game-winning goal at 6:10 of the fourth overtime. Previously, the longest game was the Greenville Grrrowl's 3 – 2 four overtime victory against the Louisiana IceGators in Game Two of the 2000 Southern Conference Finals, which lasted 121:24. The game saw another league record fall, as Elmira and Trenton combined for 145 shots on goal (75 for Trenton, 70 for Elmira), besting the 139 combined shots on goal by Louisiana (82) and the Jackson Bandits (57) in Jackson's 5 – 4 triple overtime victory in Game Two of the 2002 Southwest Division Semifinals. Elmira's goaltender, Michael Teslak made the third most saves in a single game in ECHL history with 71.

April 22 also went down in the ECHL history books as for the first time in the league's 21-year history, two Game 7s were played on the same day as the Stockton Thunder defeated the Ontario Reign 5 – 4 and the Las Vegas Wranglers defeated the Bakersfield Condors 5 – 1, both games were Pacific Division Semifinals matchups.

The Division finals saw the defending Kelly Cup champion Cincinnati Cyclones and the Alaska Aces cruise to easy Conference finals berths, under completely different circumstances. Cincinnati swept Elmira after both teams went the full seven games in their opening series, while Alaska defeated the Victoria Salmon Kings four games to one with both teams having an extended rest, with Victoria sweeping their opening series and Alaska winning their series in five games. The South Carolina Stingrays required a little more effort to oust the Florida Everblades, who sat atop the league's regular season standings, defeating them in six games to advance to play the Cyclones in the conference finals.

Three (Alaska, Cincinnati and South Carolina) of the four teams in the Conference Finals were former Kelly Cup Champions. The American Conference finals was a rematch of the 2008 edition with Cincinnati taking on South Carolina and Las Vegas made their second consecutive trip to the National Conference finals, taking on their most heated rival the Alaska Aces.

The South Carolina Stingrays led the Alaska Aces, 3-1, headed to Game 5 before blowing the lead, and having to face a Game 7, where the Stingrays clinched their third Kelly Cup with a 4-2 win, winning the series, 4-3. The Stingrays tied the ECHL record for most ECHL championships, with three. South Carolina would get their revenge on Cincinnati for defeating the Stingrays in the 2008 American Conference finals by sweeping the Cyclones in four games. The National Conference finals had the same results with Alaska sweeping Las Vegas in four games.

== Playoff seeds ==
After the 2008–09 ECHL regular season, 16 teams qualified for the playoffs. The top four teams from each division qualified for the playoffs. The Florida Everblades were the American Conference regular season champions as well as the Brabham Cup winners with the best overall regular season record. The Alaska Aces were the National Conference regular season champions. South Carolina goaltender James Reimer was named the Kelly Cup Finals MVP.

=== American Conference ===
==== North Division ====
1. Cincinnati Cyclones - 87 points
2. Trenton Devils - 87 points
3. Elmira Jackals - 85 points
4. Wheeling Nailers - 80 points

==== South Division ====
1. Florida Everblades - American Conference regular season champions, Brabham Cup winners, 103 points
2. South Carolina Stingrays - 90 points
3. Charlotte Checkers - 76 points
4. Gwinnett Gladiators - 68 points

=== National Conference ===
==== Pacific Division ====
1. Ontario Reign - 82 points
2. Las Vegas Wranglers - 76 points
3. Bakersfield Condors - 74 points
4. Stockton Thunder - 71 points

==== West Division ====
1. Alaska Aces - National Conference regular season champions, 93 points
2. Idaho Steelheads - 92 points
3. Victoria Salmon Kings - 83 points
4. Utah Grizzlies - 72 points

== Bracket ==
Division semifinals	Division finals
N1	Cincinnati	4
N4	Wheeling	3
N1	Cincinnati	4
North Division
N3	Elmira	0
N2	Trenton	3
N3	Elmira	4
American Conference
S1	Florida	4
S4	Gwinnett	1
S1	Florida	2
South Division
S2	South Carolina	4
S2	South Carolina	4
S3	Charlotte	2
P1	Ontario	3
P4	Stockton	4
P4	Stockton	3
Pacific Division
P2	Las Vegas	4
P2	Las Vegas	4
P3	Bakersfield	3
National Conference
W1	Alaska	4
W4	Utah	1
W1	Alaska	4
West Division
W3	Victoria	1
W2	Idaho	0
W3	Victoria	4

Conference finals
N1	Cincinnati	0
S2	South Carolina	4
P2	Las Vegas	0
W1	Alaska	4

Kelly Cup finals
S2	South Carolina	4
W1	Alaska	3

== Statistical leaders ==
=== Skaters ===
These are the top ten skaters based on points.

Player	Team	GP	G	A	Pts	+/–	PIM
Josh Soares	Alaska Aces	20	10	17	27	+12	19
Colin Hemingway	Alaska Aces	20	9	15	24	+12	14
Trent Campbell	South Carolina Stingrays	22	5	18	23	+2	13
Travis Morin	South Carolina Stingrays	18	4	17	21	+11	12
Cam Keith	Alaska Aces	19	3	17	20	+10	19
Alexandre Imbeault	Alaska Aces	19	7	12	19	0	10
Jeff Corey	South Carolina Stingrays	22	11	7	18	+3	12
Nikita Kashirsky	South Carolina Stingrays	21	6	12	18	+13	18
Maxime Lacroix	South Carolina Stingrays	22	12	5	17	+6	37
Pierre-Luc O'Brien	South Carolina Stingrays	22	5	12	17	0	16

GP = Games played; G = Goals; A = Assists; Pts = Points; +/– = Plus/minus; PIM = Penalty minutes; Yellow shade = team still in playoffs

All statistics as of: 08:00, 5 June 2009 (UTC)

=== Goaltending ===
These are the top five goaltenders based on both goals against average and save percentage with at least one game played (Note: list is sorted by goals against average).

Player	Team	GP	W	L	SA	GA	GAA	SV%	SO	Min
Jean-Philippe Lamoureux	Alaska Aces	20	15	5	598	38	1.89	.936	4	1205
Josh Johnson	Gwinnett Gladiators	3	0	2	124	7	2.10	.944	0	200
James Reimer	South Carolina Stingrays	7	3	3	224	16	2.20	.929	1	437
Jeff Frazee	Trenton Devils	4	2	2	116	10	2.22	.914	0	271
Curtis Darling	Wheeling Nailers	7	3	4	274	16	2.23	.942	1	430

GP = Games played; W = Wins; L = Losses; SA = Shots against; GA = Goals against; GAA = Goals against average; SV% = Save percentage; SO = Shutouts; TOI = Time on ice (in minutes); Yellow shade = team still in playoffs

All statistics as of: 08:00, 5 June 2009 (UTC)

== Division Semifinals ==
Note 1: All times are local.
Note 2: Game times in italics signify games to be played only if necessary.
Note 3: Home team is listed first.

=== American Conference ===
==== North Division ====
===== (N1) Cincinnati Cyclones vs. (N4) Wheeling Nailers =====
April 9	Cincinnati Cyclones	1 – 4	Wheeling Nailers	US Bank Arena
No scoring		First period	Aaron Clarke (1) – 15:16; Billy Ryan (1) – 15:45
No scoring		Second period	No scoring
14:33 – Felix Petit (1)		Third period	Mitch Ganzak (1) – pp – 15:20; Tommy Goebel (1) – en – 18:19
Loic Lacasse 17 saves / 20 shots		Goalie stats	Curtis Darling 36 saves / 37 shots

April 10	Cincinnati Cyclones	1 – 3	Wheeling Nailers	US Bank Arena
No scoring		First period	Doug Krantz (1) – pp – 12:38
No scoring		Second period	Jordan Morrison (1) – pp – 2:24
15:31 – pp – Matt Syroczynski (1)		Third period	Bryan Ewing (1) – 13:50
Ryan Nie 23 saves / 26 shots		Goalie stats	Curtis Darling 34 saves / 35 shots

April 11	Wheeling Nailers	3 – 7	Cincinnati Cyclones	WesBanco Arena
13:11 – Bryan Ewing (2)		First period	Dustin Sproat (1) – 19:41
12:10 – pp – Billy Ryan (2)		Second period	Matt Syroczynski (2) – pp – 0:30; Jacob Dietrich (1) – 4:28; Mark Van Guilder (1) – 18:11
15:41 – Jordan Morrison (2)		Third period	Mac Faulkner (1) – 2:39; Dustin Sproat (2) – 8:16; Jacob Dietrich (2) – 10:23
Curtis Darling 34 saves / 40 shots David Brown 4 saves / 5 shots		Goalie stats	Loic Lacasse 30 saves / 33 shots

April 15	Wheeling Nailers	3 – 4	Cincinnati Cyclones	WesBanco Arena
No scoring		First period	Matt Syroczynski (3) – pp – 4:25; Matt Syroczynski (4) – pp – 5:38
1:11 – Tommy Goebel (2)		Second period	Dustin Sproat (3) – sh – 17:10
9:30 – Aaron Clarke (2); 19:32 – sh – Aaron Clarke (3)		Third period	Jimmy Kilpatrick (1) – 1:26
Curtis Darling 31 saves / 35 shots		Goalie stats	Loic Lacasse 28 saves / 31 shots

April 17	Wheeling Nailers	1 – 2	Cincinnati Cyclones	WesBanco Arena
No scoring		First period	No scoring
Chris Snavely (1) – pp – 15:11		Second period	No scoring
No scoring		Third period	9:14 – Mike Quesnele (1); 19:15 – Barret Ehgoetz (1)
Curtis Darling 33 saves / 35 shots		Goalie stats	Loic Lacasse 23 saves / 24 shots

April 18	Cincinnati Cyclones	0 – 6	Wheeling Nailers	US Bank Arena
No scoring		First period	0:40 – Reid Cashman (1); 12:49 – Billy Ryan (3); 17:08 – pp – Reid Cashman (2); 17:53 – pp – Bryan Ewing (3)
No scoring		Second period	15:47 – Erik Johnson (1)
No scoring		Third period	4:03 – pp – Chris Snavely (2)
Loic Lacasse 13 saves / 17 shots Ryan Nie 14 saves / 16 shots		Goalie stats	Curtis Darling 41 saves / 41 shots

April 20	Cincinnati Cyclones	2 – 1	2OT	Wheeling Nailers	US Bank Arena
9:45 – Felix Petit (2)		First period		No scoring
No scoring		Second period		Jordan Morrison (3) – 3:22
No scoring		Third period		No scoring
3:48 – Matt Syroczynski (5)		Second overtime period		No scoring
Loic Lacasse 27 saves / 28 shots		Goalie stats		Curtis Darling 49 saves / 51 shots

Cincinnati wins series 4–3

===== (N2) Trenton Devils vs. (N3) Elmira Jackals =====
April 10	Trenton Devils	4 – 5	4OT	Elmira Jackals	Sovereign Bank Arena
8:26 – Tony Zancanaro (1)		First period		Slavomir Tomko (1) – 2:10; Pierre-Luc Faubert (1) – pp – 12:09; Pierre-Luc Faubert (2) – 16:44
5:25 – pp – Trevor Kell (1)		Second period		No scoring
1:53 – Dan Eves (1); 10:52 – Tony Zancanaro (2)		Third period		Chris Korchinski (1) – 19:01
No scoring		Fourth overtime period		Josh Aspenlind (1) – 6:10
Gerald Coleman 65 saves / 70 shots		Goalie stats		Michael-Lee Teslak 71 saves / 75 shots

April 11	Trenton Devils	6 –5	Elmira Jackals	Sovereign Bank Arena
5:43 – Tony Zancanaro (3); 17:26 – Dan Eves (2)		First period	Slavomir Tomko (2) – 2:58; Chris Korchinski (3) – pp – 15:24
2:15 – Justin Coutu (1); 5:56 – Mike Wilson (1)		Second period	Steve Yetman (1) – 12:50
2:06 – pp – Trevor Kell (2); 10:43 – Matt Radoslovich (1)		Third period	Chris Korchinski (4) – 12:23; Benoit Doucet (1) – 13:37
Gerald Coleman 28 saves / 33 shots		Goalie stats	Riku Helenius 32 saves / 38 shots

April 15	Elmira Jackals	5 – 0	Trenton Devils	First Arena
18:23 – pp – Brandon Roach (1)		First period	No scoring
2:49 – Brendan Connolly (1); 3:03 – Pierre-Luc Faubert (3)		Second period	No scoring
7:02 – sh – Steve Yetman (2); 16:08 – Pierre-Luc Faubert (4)		Third period	No scoring
Michael-Lee Teslak 32 saves / 32 shots		Goalie stats	Gerald Coleman 26 saves / 31 shots

April 16	Elmira Jackals	3 – 1	Trenton Devils	First Arena
No scoring		First period	Brandon Roach (2) – pp – 15:50
No scoring		Second period	Brendan Connolly (2) – pp – 7:31
3:33 - pp - Jim Henkel (1)		Third period	Pierre-Luc Faubert (5) – en – 19:41
Michael-Lee Teslak 26 saves / 27 shots		Goalie stats	Jeff Frazee 22 saves / 24 shots

April 18	Trenton Devils	3 – 2	OT	Elmira Jackals	Sovereign Bank Arena
No scoring		First period		Paul McIlveen (1) – 12:08
1:56 – Jeff Prough (1)		Second period		No scoring
5:29 – Dan Eves (3)		Third period		Chaz Johnson (1) – 4:22
7:56 – pp – Trevor Kell (3)		First overtime period		No scoring
Jeff Frazee 20 saves / 22 shots		Goalie stats		Michael-Lee Teslak 26 saves / 29 shots

April 19	Trenton Devils	3 – 2	2OT	Elmira Jackals	Sovereign Bank Arena
No scoring		First period		Chaz Johnson (2) – pp – 6:19
14:57 – Dave Leaderer (1)		Second period		No scoring
18:31 – Justin Coutu (2)		Third period		Derek Couture (1) – 18:31
5:43 – Éric Castonguay (1)		Second overtime period		No scoring
Jeff Frazee 43 saves / 45 shots		Goalie stats		Michael-Lee Teslak 38 saves / 41 shots

April 21	Elmira Jackals	3 – 5	Trenton Devils	First Arena
Mike Sgroi (1) – 8:42		First period	9:10 – Nathan Perkovich (1); 14:47 – sh – Jeff Prough (2)
Chris Korchinski (4) – pp – 8:54		Second period	No scoring
Josh Aspenlind (2) – pp – 11:43; Pierre-Luc Faubert (6) – 14:59; Steve Yetman (3) – en – 18:35		Third period	18:59 – Dave Leaderer
Michael-Lee Teslak 35 saves / 38 shots		Goalie stats	Jeff Frazee 21 saves / 25 shots

Elmira wins series 4–3

==== South Division ====
===== (S1) Florida Everblades vs. (S4) Gwinnett Gladiators =====
April 10	Florida Everblades	5 – 3	Gwinnett Gladiators	Germain Arena
5:53 – pp – Doug O'Brien (1); 17:28 – Ross Carlson (1)		First period	No scoring
18:38 – Jacob Micflikier (1); 19:59 – Mark Lee (1)		Second period	Tomislav Zanoški (1) – pp – 2:20; Brandon Kaleniecki (1) – pp – 12:40; Pat Bateman (1) – pp – 14:08
9:58 – pp – Andrew Sweetland (1)		Third period	No scoring
David Leggio 16 saves / 19 shots		Goalie stats	Joe Fallon 21 saves / 26 shots

April 11	Florida Everblades	3 – 2	OT	Gwinnett Gladiators	Germain Arena
No scoring		First period		Tomislav Zanoški (2) – 6:40; Brandon Kaleniecki (2) – pp – 16:09
No scoring		Second period		No scoring
1:16 – pp – Milan Gajic (1); 18:39 – pp – Kevin Baker (1)		Third period		No scoring
12:52 – Jacob Micflikier (2)		First overtime period		No scoring
David Leggio 23 saves / 25 shots		Goalie stats		Josh Johnson 40 saves / 43 shots

April 16	Gwinnett Gladiators	3 – 2	OT	Florida Everblades	Arena at Gwinnett Center
17:44 – Dirk Southern (1)		First period		No scoring
No scoring		Second period		No scoring
5:59 – Andy Brandt (1)		Third period		Mark Lee (2) – pp – 2:53; Peter Metcalf (1) – 19:12
12:59 – Tomislav Zanoški (3)		First overtime period		No scoring
Josh Johnson 43 saves / 45 shots Joe Fallon 4 saves / 4 shots		Goalie stats		David Leggio 27 saves / 30 shots

April 17	Gwinnett Gladiators	2 – 4	Florida Everblades	Arena at Gwinnett Center
No scoring		First period	Steve McJannet (1) – 3:23; Mark Lee (3) – pp – 17:43
8:36 – pp – Dan Sullivan (1); 9:17 – Pat Bateman (2)		Second period	No scoring
No scoring		Third period	Ross Carlson – pp – 13:05; Ross Carlson – en – 19:58
Joe Fallon 39 saves / 42 shots		Goalie stats	David Leggio 21 saves / 23 shots

April 19	Gwinnett Gladiators	1 – 2	Florida Everblades	Arena at Gwinnett Center
No scoring		First period	No scoring
Jean-Claude Sawyer (1) – 2:43		Second period	11:19 – pp – Ross Carlson (4)
No scoring		Third period	19:36 – Yannick Tifu (1)
Josh Johnson 34 saves / 36 shots		Goalie stats	David Leggio 21 saves / 22 shots

Florida wins series 4–1

===== (S2) South Carolina Stingrays vs. (S3) Charlotte Checkers =====
April 9	Charlotte Checkers	5 – 3	South Carolina Stingrays	Extreme Ice Center (Indian Trail, NC)
Marty Guerin (1) – pp – 4:47; Ethan Graham (1) – pp – 13:40		First period	6:35 – Mick Berge (1)
Matthew Ford (1) – 8:10; Marty Guerin (2) – 10:10; Mike Bayrack (1) – 10:32		Second period	0:38 – pp – Patrick Wellar (1)
No scoring		Third period	15:26 – Matt Scherer
Jeff Jakaitis 22 saves / 24 shots Maxime Daigneault 21 saves / 22 shots		Goalie stats	Jonathan Boutin 20 saves / 25 shots James Reimer 18 saves / 18 shots

April 11	Charlotte Checkers	3 – 5	South Carolina Stingrays	Extreme Ice Center (Indian Trail, NC)
Pierre-Luc O'Brien (1) – sh – 9:21		First period	No scoring
No scoring		Second period	4:18 – Ryan Murphy (1); 4:41 – Matthew Ford (2); 6:16 – pp – Ethan Graham (2); 11:44 – pp – Michel Leveille (1); 12:47 – pp – Mike Bayrack (2)
Nikita Kashirsky (1) – 8:38; Travis Morin (1) – 13:20		Third period	No scoring
Jeff Jakaitis 41 saves / 44 shots		Goalie stats	James Reimer 36 saves / 41 shots

April 14	South Carolina Stingrays	4 – 2	Charlotte Checkers	North Charleston Coliseum
No scoring		First period	10:45 – Ethan Graham (3); 14:31 – Matt Schepke (1)
Spencer Carbery (1) – 0:15; Maxime Lacroix (1) – pp – 1:49		Second period	No scoring
Keith Johnson (1) – 3:48; Maxime Lacroix (2) – 4:12		Third period	No scoring
Jonathan Boutin 18 saves / 20 shots		Goalie stats	Jeff Jakaitis 36 saves / 40 shots

April 16	South Carolina Stingrays	4 – 1	Charlotte Checkers	North Charleston Coliseum
Travis Morin (2) – pp – 13:24; Maxime Lacroix (2) – 15:23		First period	No scoring
Matt Scherer (2) – 14:33; Matt Scherer (3) – 18:30		Second period	No scoring
No scoring		Third period	10:25 – Ken Scuderi (1)
Jonathan Boutin 24 saves / 25 shots		Goalie stats	Jeff Jakaitis 22 saves / 26 shots Maxime Daigneault 13 saves / 13 shots

April 17	South Carolina Stingrays	8 – 3	Charlotte Checkers	North Charleston Coliseum
3:40 – Jeff Coffey (1); 11:29 – pp – Zach Tarkir (1); 14:23 – Spencer Carbery (2); 19:02 – pp – Brad Farynuk (1)		First period	Chris Capraro (1) – pp – 7:09; Marty Guerin (3) – 15:44
11:06 – pp – Keith Johnson (2); 17:08 – Travis Morin (3)		Second period	No scoring
9:21 – pp – Brad Farynuk (2); 13:46 – pp – Brad Farynuk (3)		Third period	Michel Leveille (2) – 4:46
Jonathan Boutin 26 saves / 29 shots		Goalie stats	Maxime Daigneault 6 saves / 10 shots Jeff Jakaitis 24 saves / 28 shots

April 19	Charlotte Checkers	3 – 4	South Carolina Stingrays	Extreme Ice Center (Indian Trail, NC)
No scoring		First period	Keith Johnson (3) – pp – 1:28; Jeff Coffey (2) – 14:26
2:58 – pp – Jeff Miles (1)		Second period	Matt Scherer (4) – 3:25
1:04 – Peter Tsimikalis; 6:11 – pp – Michel Leveille (3)		Third period	Spencer Carbery (3) – 2:48
Jeff Jakaitis 36 saves / 40 shots		Goalie stats	Jonathan Boutin 32 saves / 35 shots

South Carolina wins series 4–2

NOTE: Neither team's home arena was available in the first week of the ECHL playoffs; Time Warner Cable Arena was unavailable for this round (final week of NBA games by the Charlotte Bobcats, and the North Charleston Coliseum had rehearsals for a concert tour. The ECHL arranged the playoff series in the following order: two games at the Extreme Ice Center, three games at the North Charleston Coliseum, and then one game at the Extreme Ice Center. Had a seventh game been necessary, it would have been played at the North Charleston Coliseum.

=== National Conference ===
==== Pacific Division ====
===== (P1) Ontario Reign vs. (P4) Stockton Thunder =====
April 10	Ontario Reign	4 – 3	Stockton Thunder	Citizens Business Bank Arena
19:01 – Shawn Germain (1)		First period	No scoring
6:55 – pp – Jon Rheault (1)		Second period	Cory Urquhart (1) – 14:18
0:59 – P.J. Atherton (1); 12:18 – pp – Shawn Germain (2)		Third period	Cory Urquhart (2) – 7:18; Cory Urquhart (2) – pp – 11:27
Jeff Zatkoff 30 saves / 33 shots		Goalie stats	Andrew Perugini 17 saves / 19 shots Bryan Pitton 8 saves / 10 shots

April 11	Ontario Reign	5 – 6	Stockton Thunder	Citizens Business Bank Arena
19:13 – Bud Holloway (1)		First period	Mike Lalonde (1) – 13:23; Cleve Kinley (1) – 13:53; Brandon Naurato (1) – 17:22
No scoring		Second period	Craig Valette (1) – 0:28; Ryan Huddy (1) – 15:39
2:27 – Mike Howe; 13:27 – Bud Holloway (2); 15:37 – Bud Holloway (3); 19:35 – Tim Kraus (1)		Third period	Craig Valette (2) – en – 19:17
Jeff Zatkoff 19 saves / 24 shots		Goalie stats	Bryan Pitton 24 saves / 29 shots

April 15	Stockton Thunder	1 – 5	Ontario Reign	Stockton Arena
No scoring		First period	Dale Reinhardt (1) – 8:57
9:51 – Mark Adamek (1)		Second period	Bud Holloway (4) – 0:42
No scoring		Third period	Geoff Walker (1) – 4:58; Shawn Germain (3) – pp – 10:23; Geoff Walker (2) – pp – 17:33
Bryan Pitton 25 saves / 30 shots		Goalie stats	Jeff Zatkoff 21 saves / 22 shots

April 17	Stockton Thunder	5 – 4	OT	Ontario Reign	Stockton Arena
2:00 – David Rohlfs (1)		First period		Tim Kraus (2) – pp – 6:48
10:27 – Cory Urquhart (4); 14:29 – Ryan Huddy (2)		Second period		Tim Kraus (3) – pp – 7:20
6:13 – James Bates (2)		Third period		Jon Rheault (2) – sh – 18:08; Bud Holloway (5) – sh – 19:37
2:28 – James Bates (3)		First overtime period		No scoring
Parker Van Buskirk 29 saves / 33 shots		Goalie stats		Jeff Zatkoff 33 saves / 38 shots

April 19	Stockton Thunder	4 – 2	Ontario Reign	Stockton Arena
Cory Urquhart (5) – 8:15; Cleve Kinley – pp – 12:29		First period	No scoring
Craig Valette (3) – 8:40; James Bates (3) – 16:51		Second period	2:09 – Andrew Martens (1)
No scoring		Third period	6:34 – Jon Francisco (1)
Parker Van Buskirk 30 saves / 32 shots		Goalie stats	Jeff Zatkoff 24 saves / 28 shots

April 21	Ontario Reign	4 – 3	Stockton Thunder	Citizens Business Bank Arena
Tim Kraus (4) – 8:25; Jon Rheault (3) – 14:42; Jon Rheault (4) – 19:49		First period	No scoring
Brad Mehalko (1) – 17:20		Second period	No scoring
No scoring		Third period	6:10 – Garet Hunt (1); 11:18 – Cleve Kinley (3); 16:17 – James Bates (4)
Jeff Zatkoff 29 saves / 32 shots		Goalie stats	Parker Van Buskirk 23 saves / 27 shots

April 22	Ontario Reign	4 – 5	Stockton Thunder	Citizens Business Bank Arena
13:05 – Andrew Martens (2)		First period	Robbie Bina (1) – pp – 8:32; Cory Urquhart (6) – 14:32; Igor Gongalsky (1) – 15:28; James Bates (5) – pp – 18:46
No scoring		Second period	No scoring
2:16 – Brad Mehalko (2); 12:00 – Tim Kraus (5); 16:45 – Geoff Walker (3)		Third period	Craig Valette (4) – pp – 5:36
Jeff Zatkoff 21 saves / 26 shots		Goalie stats	Parker Van Buskirk 27 saves / 31 shots

Stockton wins series 4–3

===== (P2) Las Vegas Wranglers vs. (P3) Bakersfield Condors =====
April 10	Las Vegas Wranglers	3 – 1	Bakersfield Condors	Orleans Arena
6:51 – Kelly Czuy (1); 17:24 – Adam Miller (1)		First period	Brett Pilkington (1) – 0:34
4:33 – Kelly Czuy (2)		Second period	No scoring
No scoring		Third period	No scoring
Glenn Fisher 28 saves / 29 shots		Goalie stats	Yutaka Fukufuji 28 saves / 31 shots

April 11	Las Vegas Wranglers	2 – 3	Bakersfield Condors	Orleans Arena

April 15	Bakersfield Condors	6 – 5	OT	Las Vegas Wranglers	Rabobank Arena

April 17	Bakersfield Condors	0 – 4	Las Vegas Wranglers	Rabobank Arena

April 18	Bakersfield Condors	4 – 3	OT	Las Vegas Wranglers	Rabobank Arena

April 21	Las Vegas Wranglers	3 – 1	Bakersfield Condors	Orleans Arena

April 22	Las Vegas Wranglers	5 – 1	Bakersfield Condors	Orleans Arena

Las Vegas wins series 4–3

==== West Division ====
===== (W1) Alaska Aces vs. (W4) Utah Grizzlies =====
April 10	Alaska Aces	2 – 0	Utah Grizzlies	Sullivan Arena
No scoring		First period	No scoring
16:47 – pp – Bryan Miller (1)		Second period	No scoring
6:35 – Lance Galbraith (1)		Third period	No scoring
Jean-Philippe Lamoureux 36 saves / 36 shots		Goalie stats	Mike Mole 37 saves / 39 shots

April 11	Alaska Aces	2 – 0	Utah Grizzlies	Sullivan Arena
19:57 – Luke Erickson (1)		First period	No scoring
No scoring		Second period	No scoring
3:35 – Alexandre Imbeault (1)		Third period	No scoring
Jean-Philippe Lamoureux 22 saves / 22 shots		Goalie stats	Mike Mole 36 saves / 38 shots

April 15	Utah Grizzlies	3 – 2	OT	Alaska Aces	E Center
No scoring		First period		No scoring
16:10 – James Sixsmith (1)		Second period		Matt Stefanishion (1) – 8:08
14:57 – Vladimir Nikiforov (1)		Third period		Matt Shasby (1) – 11:57
3:30 – Brett Beauchamp (1)		Overtime		No scoring
Mike Mole 30 saves / 32 shots		Goalie stats		Jean-Philippe Lamoureux 40 saves / 43 shots

April 17	Utah Grizzlies	2 – 5	Alaska Aces	E Center
10:27 – Vladimir Nikiforov (2)		First period	Tyson Marsh (1) – 8:14; Josh Soares (2) – 9:34; Josh Soares (3) – 19:34
No scoring		Second period	Lance Galbraith (2) – pp – 14:20
1:23 – James Sixsmith (2)		Third period	Luke Erickson (2) – 1:03
Mike Mole 21 saves / 26 shots		Goalie stats	Jean-Philippe Lamoureux 23 saves / 25 shots

April 18	Utah Grizzlies	2 – 5	Alaska Aces	E Center
No scoring		First period	No scoring
No scoring		Second period	No scoring
Vladimir Nikiforov (3) – 3:23; James Sixsmith (3) – 11:29		Third period	4:58 – Josh Soares (4); 8:27 – Josh Soares (5); 10:05 – Lance Galbraith (3); 10:38 – Colin Hemingway (1); 19:31 – en – Cam Keith (1)
Mike Mole 43 saves / 47 shots		Goalie stats	Jean-Philippe Lamoureux 26 saves / 28 shots

Alaska wins series 4–1

===== (W2) Idaho Steelheads vs. (W3) Victoria Salmon Kings =====
April 11	Idaho Steelheads	1 – 3	Victoria Salmon Kings	Qwest Arena
No scoring		First period	No scoring
8:32 – Matt McKnight (1)		Second period	No scoring
No scoring		Third period	Olivier Labelle (1) – 7:14; Brady Leavold (1) – 14:30; Shaun Landolt (1) – en – 18:22
Matt Climie 36 saves / 38 shots		Goalie stats	Todd Ford 29 saves / 30 shots

April 12	Idaho Steelheads	0 – 2	Victoria Salmon Kings	Qwest Arena
No scoring		First period	Olivier Labelle (2) – 8:08
No scoring		Second period	No scoring
No scoring		Third period	Adam Taylor (1) – en – 19:58
Matt Climie 20 saves / 21 shots		Goalie stats	Todd Ford 51 saves / 51 shots

April 15	Victoria Salmon Kings	9 – 2	Idaho Steelheads	Save-On-Foods Memorial Centre
0:40 – Patrick Coulombe (1); 7:11 – pp – Aaron Brocklehurst (1); 8:07 – Sean O'Connor (1); 8:53 – pp – Olivier Filion (1); 19:15 – Olivier Labelle (3)		First period	Daniel Welch (1) – 5:00
8:16 – pp – Wes Goldie (1); 9:06 – pp – Scott Howes (1); 17:33 – Shaun Landolt (2)		Second period	No scoring
8:16 – Scott Howes (2)		Third period	Bryan McGregor (1) – 7:42
Todd Ford 28 saves / 30 shots		Goalie stats	Matt Climie 3 saves / 6 shots Réjean Beauchemin 15 saves / 21 shots

April 17	Victoria Salmon Kings	2 – 1	OT	Idaho Steelheads	Save-On-Foods Memorial Centre
No scoring		First period		Darrell Hay (1) – pp – 14:05
No scoring		Second period		No scoring
8:23 – Adam Taylor (2)		Third period		No scoring
12:56 – Matt Kelly (1)		First overtime period		No scoring
Todd Ford 31 saves / 32 shots		Goalie stats		Matt Climie 38 saves / 40 shots

Victoria wins series 4–0

== Division Finals ==
=== American Conference ===
==== North Division ====
===== (N1) Cincinnati Cyclones vs. (N3) Elmira Jackas =====
April 24	Cincinnati Cyclones	8 – 3	Elmira Jackals	US Bank Arena

April 25	Cincinnati Cyclones	5 – 4	OT	Elmira Jackals	US Bank Arena

April 29	Elmira Jackals	2 – 4	Cincinnati Cyclones	First Arena

May 1	Elmira Jackals	0 – 2	Cincinnati Cyclones	First Arena

Cincinnati wins series 4–0

==== South Division ====
===== (S1) Florida Everblades vs. (S2) South Carolina Stingrays =====
April 24	Florida Everblades	1 – 2	OT	South Carolina Stingrays	Germain Arena
No scoring		First period		Matt Scherer (5) – 19:11
No scoring		Second period		No scoring
1:20 – pp – Ernie Hartlieb (1)		Third period		No scoring
No scoring		First overtime period		Zach Tarkir (2) – 8:34
David Leggio 27 saves / 29 shots		Goalie stats		Jonathan Boutin 31 saves / 32 shots

April 25	Florida Everblades	4 – 3	South Carolina Stingrays	Germain Arena

May 1	South Carolina Stingrays	4 – 3	Florida Everblades	North Charleston Coliseum

May 2	South Carolina Stingrays	2 – 3	2OT	Florida Everblades	North Charleston Coliseum

May 3	South Carolina Stingrays	4 – 3	Florida Everblades	North Charleston Coliseum

May 5	Florida Everblades	3 – 4	OT	South Carolina Stingrays	Germain Arena

South Carolina wins series 4–2

=== National Conference ===
==== Pacific Division ====
===== (P2) Las Vegas Wranglers vs. (P4) Stockton Thunder =====
April 24	Stockton Thunder	4 – 3	Las Vegas Wranglers	Stockton Arena

April 27	Las Vegas Wranglers	4 – 2	Stockton Thunder	Orleans Arena

April 30	Stockton Thunder	5 – 1	Las Vegas Wranglers	Stockton Arena

May 2	Stockton Thunder	2 – 3	OT	Las Vegas Wranglers	Stockton Arena

May 4	Las Vegas Wranglers	4 – 2	Stockton Thunder	Orleans Arena

May 5	Las Vegas Wranglers	1 – 3	Stockton Thunder	Orleans Arena

May 6	Las Vegas Wranglers	5 – 1	Stockton Thunder	Orleans Arena

Las Vegas wins series 4–3

NOTE: Arena conflicts led to the ECHL shifting the first games of the playoff series.

==== West Division ====
===== (W1) Alaska Aces vs. (W3) Victoria Salmon Kings =====
April 24	Alaska Aces	3 – 0	Victoria Salmon Kings	Sullivan Arena

April 25	Alaska Aces	8 – 2	Victoria Salmon Kings	Sullivan Arena

April 29	Victoria Salmon Kings	2 – 5	Alaska Aces	Save-On-Foods Memorial Centre

May 1	Victoria Salmon Kings	4 – 0	Alaska Aces	Save-On-Foods Memorial Centre

May 2	Victoria Salmon Kings	4 – 6	Alaska Aces	Save-On-Foods Memorial Centre

Alaska wins series 4–1

== Conference finals ==
=== American Conference ===
==== (S2) South Carolina Stingrays vs. (N1) Cincinnati Cyclones ====
May 9	South Carolina Stingrays	7 – 4	Cincinnati Cyclones	North Charleston Coliseum

May 11	South Carolina Stingrays	3 – 1	Cincinnati Cyclones	North Charleston Coliseum

May 13	Cincinnati Cyclones	3 – 4	South Carolina Stingrays	US Bank Arena

May 15	Cincinnati Cyclones	2 – 3	South Carolina Stingrays	US Bank Arena

South Carolina wins series 4–0

=== National Conference ===
==== (W1) Alaska Aces vs. (P2) Las Vegas Wranglers ====
May 9	Alaska Aces	2 – 0	Las Vegas Wranglers	Sullivan Arena

May 10	Alaska Aces	4 – 1	Las Vegas Wranglers	Sullivan Arena

May 12	Las Vegas Wranglers	1 – 3	Alaska Aces	Orleans Arena

May 14	Las Vegas Wranglers	1 – 5	Alaska Aces	Orleans Arena

Alaska wins series 4–0

== Kelly Cup Finals ==
=== (W1) Alaska Aces vs. (S2) South Carolina Stingrays ===
May 22	Alaska Aces	2 – 4	South Carolina Stingrays	Sullivan Arena

May 23	Alaska Aces	3 – 1	South Carolina Stingrays	Sullivan Arena

May 27	South Carolina Stingrays	4 – 2	Alaska Aces	North Charleston Coliseum

May 29	South Carolina Stingrays	5 – 0	Alaska Aces	North Charleston Coliseum

May 30	South Carolina Stingrays	2 – 3	OT	Alaska Aces	North Charleston Coliseum

June 4	Alaska Aces	3 – 2	South Carolina Stingrays	Sullivan Arena

June 5	Alaska Aces	2 – 4	South Carolina Stingrays	Sullivan Arena

South Carolina wins Kelly Cup 4–3.

== See also ==
- 2008–09 ECHL season
- List of ECHL seasons

Preceded by 2008 Kelly Cup playoffs	Kelly Cup Playoffs; 2009	Succeeded by 2010 Kelly Cup playoffs
