= Mike Bayrack =

Canadian ice hockey player (born 1978)

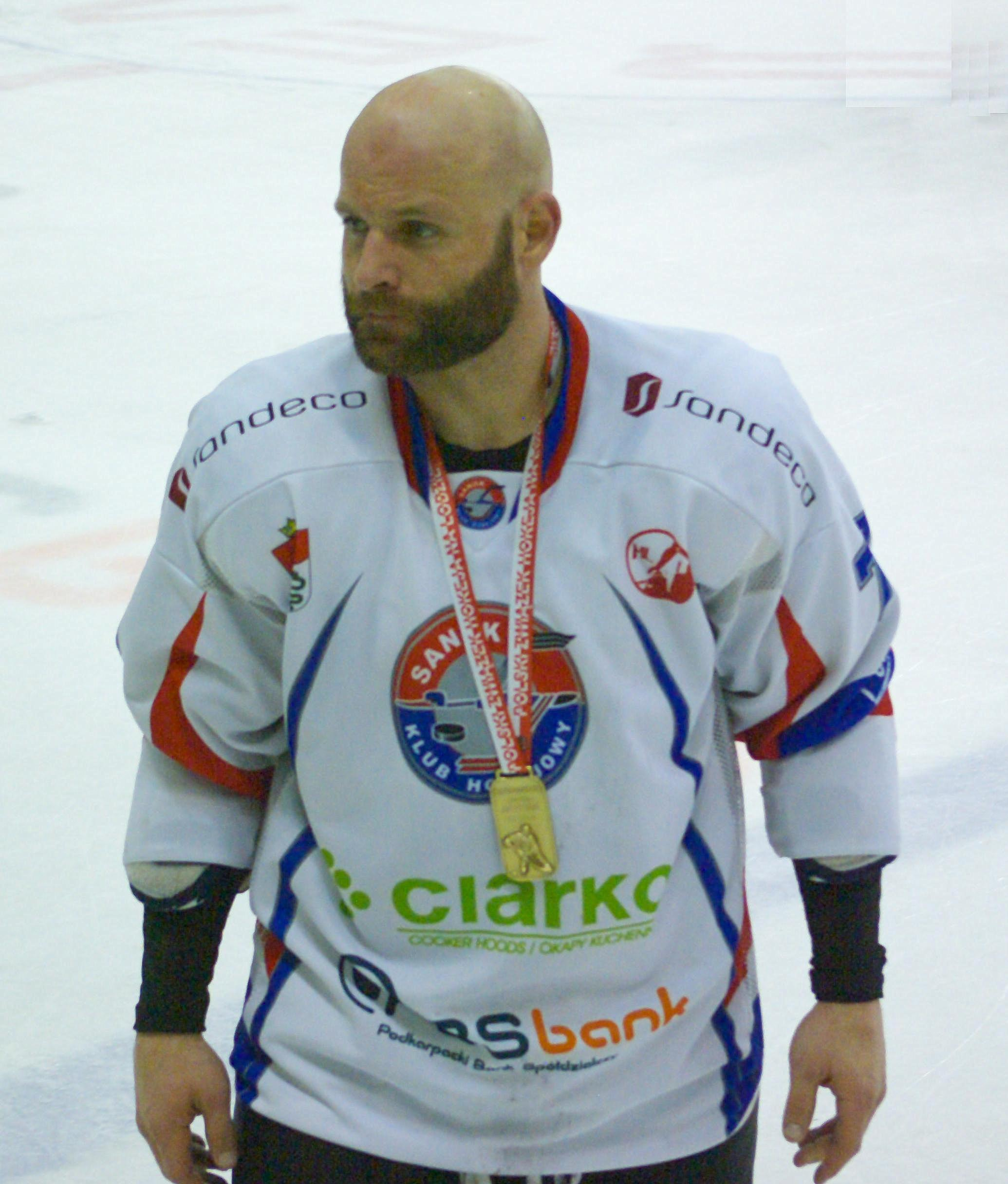
- Born: September 17, 1978 (age 48) Edmonton, Alberta, Canada
- Height: 5 ft 11 in (180 cm)
- Weight: 205 lb (93 kg; 14 st 9 lb)
- Position: Centre
- Shot: Left
- Played for: Grand Rapids Griffins; Norfolk Admirals; Bridgeport Sound Tigers; Springfield Falcons; SønderjyskE; Belfast Giants; HK Jesenice
- NHL draft: Undrafted
- Playing career: 1999–2014

Mike Bayrack (born September 17, 1978) is a Canadian former professional ice hockey player.

== Playing career ==
Bayrack had played ten seasons of professional hockey in the United States, and also had experience in Europe having played in Denmark, Germany, Slovenia, the UK, and Poland.

After playing the 2013–14 with Polish club, KH Sanok in the Polska Hokej Liga, Bayrack agreed to return to North America from four seasons abroad to play under former teammate and Head Coach Brad Smyth, in signing a one-year contract with the Denver Cutthroats in the Central Hockey League on June 24, 2014. Prior to the 2014–15 season, Bayrack was released from his contract with the Cutthroats, after the team announced immediate dormancy due to financial issues on August 20, 2014.

== Career statistics ==
			Regular season					Playoffs
Season	Team	League	GP	G	A	Pts	PIM	GP	G	A	Pts	PIM
1995–96	Lethbridge Hurricanes	WHL	57	3	1	4	45	1	0	0	0	0
1996–97	Lethbridge Hurricanes	WHL	1	0	0	0	5	—	—	—	—	—
1996–97	Medicine Hat Tigers	WHL	12	1	2	3	2	—	—	—	—	—
1996–97	Prince George Cougars	WHL	37	5	1	6	45	14	0	1	1	18
1997–98	Prince George Cougars	WHL	66	21	38	59	107	11	2	1	3	7
1998–99	Prince George Cougars	WHL	70	37	33	70	71	7	7	1	8	17
1999–00	Jackson Bandits	ECHL	50	16	13	29	20	—	—	—	—	—
1999–00	Greensboro Generals	ECHL	15	1	5	6	4	—	—	—	—	—
2000–01	Missouri River Otters	UHL	43	10	15	25	16	—	—	—	—	—
2000–01	Muskegon Lumberjacks	UHL	19	7	10	17	34	5	1	0	1	4
2001–02	Muskegon Lumberjacks	UHL	71	29	34	63	49	17	3	5	8	12
2001–02	Grand Rapids Griffins	AHL	2	0	0	0	0	—	—	—	—	—
2002–03	Toledo Storm	ECHL	47	11	16	27	47	—	—	—	—	—
2002–03	Greensboro Generals	ECHL	12	4	5	9	10	8	2	8	10	4
2003–04	Greensboro Generals	ECHL	68	36	34	70	82	—	—	—	—	—
2003–04	Norfolk Admirals	AHL	1	0	1	1	0	—	—	—	—	—
2003–04	Bridgeport Sound Tigers	AHL	1	0	0	0	0	2	0	0	0	2
2004–05	Danbury Trashers	UHL	71	37	36	73	42	11	3	1	4	33
2004–05	Bridgeport Sound Tigers	AHL	5	0	0	0	2	—	—	—	—	—
2004–05	Springfield Falcons	AHL	4	0	0	0	0	—	—	—	—	—
2005–06	Charlotte Checkers	ECHL	62	27	25	52	70	3	0	0	0	4
2006–07	Texas Wildcatters	ECHL	66	33	45	78	71	10	3	3	6	10
2007–08	SønderjyskE	DEN	8	1	4	5	2	—	—	—	—	—
2007–08	Heilbronner Falken	2.GBun	3	2	1	3	25	—	—	—	—	—
2007–08	Charlotte Checkers	ECHL	39	17	20	37	20	3	0	0	0	4
2008–09	Charlotte Checkers	ECHL	60	21	39	60	34	6	2	5	7	4
2009–10	Stockton Thunder	ECHL	6	0	0	0	4	—	—	—	—	—
2009–10	Gwinnett Gladiators	ECHL	9	2	4	6	6	—	—	—	—	—
2009–10	Florida Everblades	ECHL	19	6	6	12	20	7	5	2	7	2
2010–11	Belfast Giants	EIHL	36	12	23	35	18	—	—	—	—	—
2010–11	HK Jesenice	EBEL	14	4	3	7	6	—	—	—	—	—
2011–12	Braehead Clan	EIHL	50	31	40	71	66	—	—	—	—	—
2012–13	Coventry Blaze	EIHL	31	7	9	16	10	4	1	1	2	2
2013–14	KH Sanok	PHL	10	3	5	8	26	13	5	0	5	30
ECHL totals			453	174	212	386	388	37	12	18	30	28
AHL totals			13	0	1	1	2	2	0	0	0	2
