= Imbeault =

Imbeault is a surname. Notable people with the surname include:

- Alexandre Imbeault (born 1986), Canadian ice hockey player
- Louise Imbeault (born 1948), Canadian journalist, women's rights advocate, and politician
