= Nikita Kashirsky =

Russian ice hockey player (born 1985)

- Born: 25 January 1985 (age 40) Moscow, Russian SFSR, Soviet Union
- Height: 6 ft 0 in (183 cm)
- Weight: 192 lb (87 kg; 13 st 10 lb)
- Position: Forward
- Shot: Left
- ECHL team Former teams: Reading Royals; Springfield Falcons; Manitoba Moose; Hershey Bears; HC Spartak Moscow; Dundee Stars
- Playing career: 2009–2016

Nikita Kashirsky (born 25 January 1985) is a Russian former professional ice hockey forward.

== Playing career ==
Kashirsky spent four seasons at Norwich University in the ECAC East before turning pro after his senior year with the ECHL's South Carolina Stingrays, scoring 18 points in 21 post-season games as a rookie as the Stingrays were crowned Kelly Cup Champions. He also had spells in the American Hockey League's Springfield Falcons, Manitoba Moose, and Hershey Bears. He signed with the Gwinnett Gladiators on September 28, 2011.

On August 25, 2012, Kashirsky signed with HC Spartak Moscow of the Kontinental Hockey League but was released from his contract a short time later. On December 27, 2013, Kashirsky returned to ECHL signing with Reading Royals, helping the franchise claim their first and his second Kelly Cup.

On August 6, 2013, Kashirsky left the Royals and returned abroad to the United Kingdom, signing a one-year contract as well as accepting an assistant coaching role within the Dundee Stars of the Elite Ice Hockey League. During the 2013–14 season, Kashirsky placed third in team scoring and helped the Stars claim the Gardner Conference Championship.

After a single season with the Stars, Kashirsky made a return to North America by agreeing to a one-year contract with the Wichita Thunder of the ECHL on July 9, 2014. In the 2014–15 season, Kashirsky appeared in 64 games for the Thunder to record 39 points.

On August 4, 2015, Kashirsky signed a contract with fellow ECHL competitors, the Greenville Road Warriors (later renamed the Swamp Rabbits), as a free agent. In the 2015–16 season, Kashirsky added 2 assists in 5 games as an alternate captain before he was waived by the Swamp Rabbits to make way for the Jordan Knackstedt signing on November 4, 2015. On November 11, 2015, Kashirsky joined his fifth ECHL club in signing a contract with the Fort Wayne Komets. Kashirsky was immediately placed into an offensive role with the Komets and in 31 games contributed with 19 points. On February 5, 2016, Kashirsky was again on the move as he was traded to return for a second stint the Reading Royals.

== Career statistics ==
			Regular season					Playoffs
Season	Team	League	GP	G	A	Pts	PIM	GP	G	A	Pts	PIM
2004–05	Walpole Jr. Stars	EJHL	54	29	22	51	32	—	—	—	—	—
2005–06	Norwich University	ECAC-E	29	19	23	42	24	—	—	—	—	—
2006–07	Norwich University	ECAC-E	28	17	9	26	42	—	—	—	—	—
2007–08	Norwich University	ECAC-E	28	20	22	42	25	—	—	—	—	—
2008–09	Norwich University	ECAC-E	25	17	17	34	20	—	—	—	—	—
2008–09	South Carolina Stingrays	ECHL	13	3	4	7	8	21	6	12	18	18
2009–10	South Carolina Stingrays	ECHL	39	19	16	35	50	5	0	1	1	0
2009–10	Springfield Falcons	AHL	9	1	2	3	6	—	—	—	—	—
2009–10	Manitoba Moose	AHL	16	2	1	3	8	—	—	—	—	—
2010–11	South Carolina Stingrays	ECHL	34	11	15	26	33	—	—	—	—	—
2010–11	Hershey Bears	AHL	14	2	0	2	0	—	—	—	—	—
2011–12	Gwinnett Gladiators	ECHL	64	16	33	49	60	4	2	0	2	0
2012–13	HC Spartak Moscow	KHL	1	0	0	0	2	—	—	—	—	—
2012–13	Reading Royals	ECHL	41	17	27	44	40	22	5	15	20	12
2013–14	Dundee Stars	EIHL	51	23	33	56	28	2	2	1	3	0
2014–15	Wichita Thunder	ECHL	64	16	23	39	22	—	—	—	—	—
2015–16	Greenville Swamp Rabbits	ECHL	5	0	2	2	2	—	—	—	—	—
2015–16	Fort Wayne Komets	ECHL	31	6	13	19	14	—	—	—	—	—
2015–16	Reading Royals	ECHL	24	7	12	19	4	12	2	6	8	4
AHL totals			39	5	3	8	14	—	—	—	—	—
