= Jeff Frazee =

American ice hockey player (born 1987)

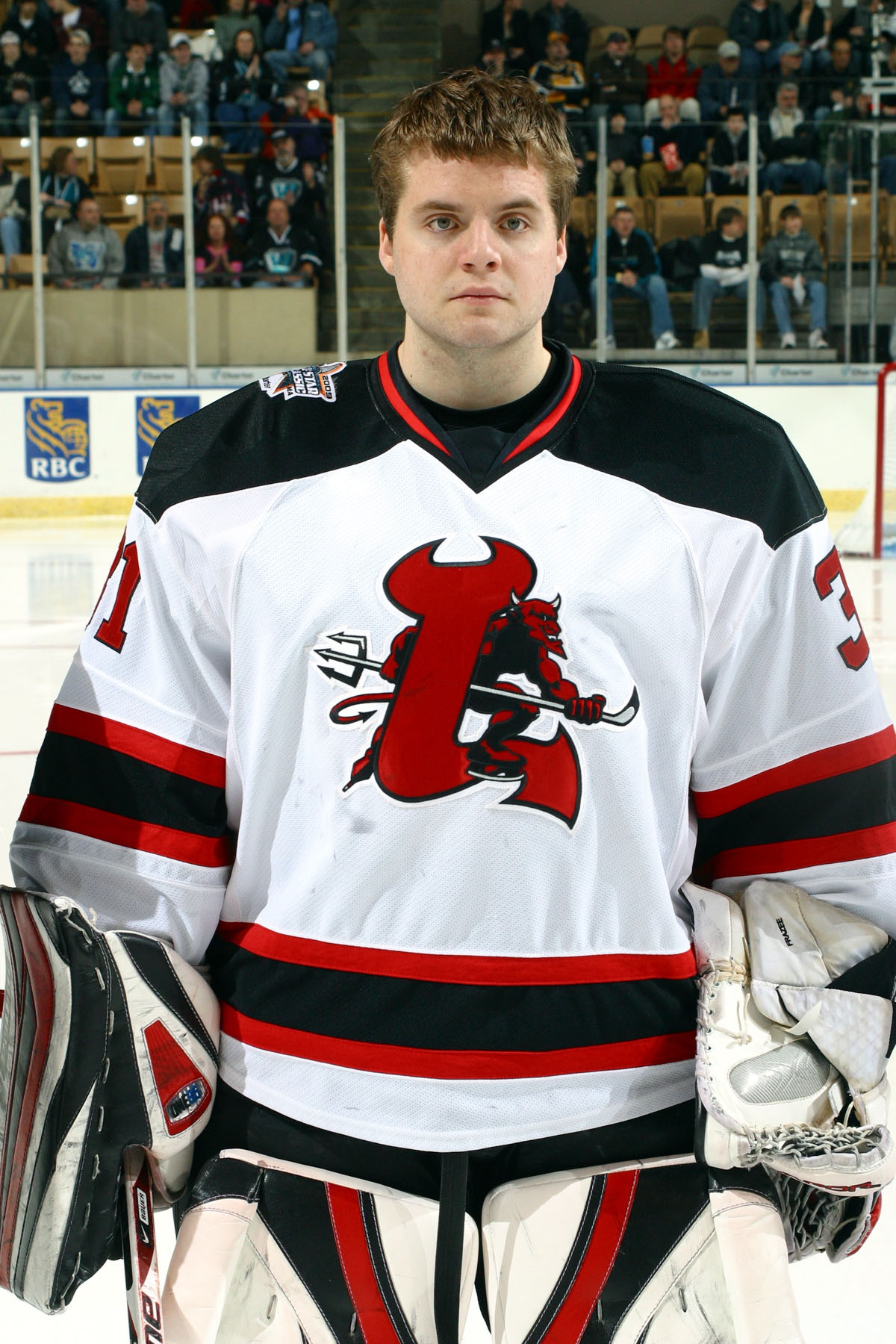
- Frazee with the Lowell Devils in 2009
- Born: May 13, 1987 (age 38) Edina, Minnesota, U.S.
- Height: 6 ft 0 in (183 cm)
- Weight: 201 lb (91 kg; 14 st 5 lb)
- Position: Goaltender
- Caught: Left
- Played for: New Jersey Devils; HC Valpellice; SønderjyskE Ishockey; Kassel Huskies; Esbjerg Energy; HDD Olimpija Ljubljana
- National team: United States
- NHL draft: 38th overall, 2005; New Jersey Devils
- Playing career: 2008–2017

Jeffrey James Frazee (born May 13, 1987) is an American former professional ice hockey goaltender. He played college hockey for the Minnesota Golden Gophers and was drafted in the second round of the 2005 NHL entry draft by the New Jersey Devils of the National Hockey League (NHL). He played one game for the Devils during the 2012–13 season.

== Early life ==
Frazee was born in Edina, Minnesota, but grew up in Burnsville, Minnesota.

== Playing career ==
He was drafted in the second round, 38th overall, in the 2005 NHL entry draft by the New Jersey Devils.

In Frazee's freshman and sophomore seasons at the University of Minnesota, he played in 32 games, compiling a 20-6-3 record. At the end of the 2007–08 season, Frazee joined the Lowell Devils. He played in one game, making 22 saves in his AHL debut against the Worcester Sharks. He was promoted to Lowell in 2008 after Martin Brodeur went on injured reserve in November and the Devils called up Scott Clemmensen. Frazee was selected to play in the 2009 AHL All-Star Game in Worcester, Massachusetts, where he played alongside the best players in the AHL, and former college teammate Ryan Potulny. On February 19, 2009, Frazee won against the Albany River Rats to set a new Lowell Devils franchise record for wins in a season with 21.

With the injury of Brodeur in March 2013, Frazee was called up to act as back-up to Johan Hedberg, along with Keith Kinkaid. Frazee then made his NHL debut in a 6–3 loss to the Carolina Hurricanes on March 9, 2013. On August 23, it was announced that Frazee had signed with HC Valpellice of the Italian Elite A. He started the following season at SønderjyskE Ishockey, but left the Danish team over the course of the season to join the Kassel Huskies of the German DEL2.

In the 2015–16 season, he helped Esbjerg Energy win the Danish championship. On July 6, 2016, Frazee inked a deal with HDD Olimpija Ljubljana, a Slovenian side competing in the Austrian Hockey League (EBEL). He left HDD Olimpija Ljubljana after the 2016–17 season.

== Career statistics ==
=== Regular season and playoffs ===
| | | | Regular season | | | | | | | | | | Playoffs |
| Season | Team | League | GP | W | L | T | OTL | MIN | GA | SO | GAA | SV% | GP | W | L | MIN | GA | SO | GAA | SV% |
|---|---|---|---|---|---|---|---|---|---|---|---|---|---|---|---|---|---|---|---|---|
| 2001–02 | Academy of Holy Angels | HS-MN | 6 | 6 | 0 | 0 | — | — | — | — | — | — | — | — | — | — | — | — | — | — |
| 2002–03 | Academy of Holy Angels | HS-MN | 16 | 14 | 1 | 1 | — | — | — | — | — | — | — | — | — | — | — | — | — | — |
| 2003–04 | USNTDP U17 | NTDP | 16 | 9 | 3 | 0 | — | 781 | 31 | 0 | 2.38 | — | — | — | — | — | — | — | — | — |
| 2003–04 | USNTDP U18 | NTDP | 25 | 14 | 8 | 3 | — | 1463 | 71 | 3 | 2.91 | — | — | — | — | — | — | — | — | — |
| 2004–05 | USNTDP U18 | NTDP | 24 | — | — | — | — | 1309 | 59 | 3 | 2.71 | — | — | — | — | — | — | — | — | — |
| 2004–05 | USNTDP | NAHL | 9 | 8 | 1 | 0 | — | 500 | 18 | 1 | 2.16 | .922 | — | — | — | — | — | — | — | — |
| 2005–06 | University of Minnesota | WCHA | 12 | 6 | 3 | — | 2 | 660 | 26 | 2 | 2.36 | .910 | — | — | — | — | — | — | — | — |
| 2006–07 | University of Minnesota | WCHA | 20 | 14 | 3 | — | 1 | 1148 | 45 | 1 | 2.35 | .903 | — | — | — | — | — | — | — | — |
| 2007–08 | University of Minnesota | WCHA | 14 | 6 | 7 | — | 0 | 798 | 39 | 1 | 2.93 | .890 | — | — | — | — | — | — | — | — |
| 2007–08 | Lowell Devils | AHL | 1 | 0 | 1 | — | 0 | 40 | 3 | 0 | 4.50 | .880 | — | — | — | — | — | — | — | — |
| 2008–09 | Lowell Devils | AHL | 58 | 28 | 22 | — | 6 | 3407 | 149 | 4 | 2.62 | .920 | — | — | — | — | — | — | — | — |
| 2008–09 | Trenton Devils | ECHL | 5 | 2 | 2 | — | 0 | 272 | 12 | 0 | 2.65 | .912 | 4 | 2 | 2 | 271 | 10 | 0 | 2.22 | .914 |
| 2009–10 | Lowell Devils | AHL | 31 | 14 | 16 | — | 0 | 1778 | 83 | 1 | 2.80 | .910 | — | — | — | — | — | — | — | — |
| 2010–11 | Albany Devils | AHL | 33 | 11 | 15 | — | 3 | 1842 | 89 | 2 | 2.90 | .902 | — | — | — | — | — | — | — | — |
| 2011–12 | Albany Devils | AHL | 36 | 12 | 19 | — | 2 | 2042 | 91 | 2 | 2.67 | .906 | — | — | — | — | — | — | — | — |
| 2012–13 | New Jersey Devils | NHL | 1 | 0 | 0 | — | 0 | 19 | 0 | 0 | 0.00 | 1.000 | — | — | — | — | — | — | — | — |
| 2012–13 | Albany Devils | AHL | 28 | 8 | 14 | — | 5 | 1654 | 71 | 1 | 2.58 | .916 | — | — | — | — | — | — | — | — |
| 2013–14 | HC Valpellice | ITA | 39 | 23 | 15 | — | 0 | 2264 | 117 | 0 | 3.10 | .904 | 6 | 1 | 5 | — | — | — | 3.89 | .888 |
| 2014–15 | SønderjyskE | DEN | 9 | — | — | — | — | — | — | — | 2.43 | .906 | — | — | — | — | — | — | — | — |
| 2013–14 | Kassel Huskies | DEL2 | 20 | — | — | — | — | 1212 | 52 | 2 | 2.57 | — | 2 | — | — | — | — | — | 2.17 | — |
| 2015–16 | Esbjerg Energy | DEN | 45 | — | — | — | — | 1805 | 74 | 0 | 2.46 | .903 | 13 | — | — | — | — | — | 2.06 | .922 |
| 2016–17 | HDD Olimpija Ljubljana | EBEL | 45 | 11 | 34 | — | 0 | 2622 | 169 | 0 | 3.87 | .900 | — | — | — | — | — | — | — | — |
| 2016–17 | HDD Olimpija Ljubljana | SLO | — | — | — | — | — | — | — | — | — | — | 4 | — | — | — | — | — | 4.74 | .839 |
| NHL totals | | | 1 | 0 | 0 | — | 0 | 19 | 0 | 0 | 0.00 | 1.000 | — | — | — | — | — | — | — | — |

=== International ===
| Year | Team | Event | GP | W | L | T | MIN | GA | SO | GAA | SV% |
|---|---|---|---|---|---|---|---|---|---|---|---|
| 2004 | United States | U18 | 1 | 0 | 0 | 0 | 9 | 0 | 0 | 0.00 | 1.00 |
| 2005 | United States | U18 | 6 | 6 | 0 | 0 | 360 | 8 | 1 | 1.33 | .959 |
| 2006 | United States | WJC | 1 | 1 | 0 | 0 | 60 | 5 | 0 | 5.00 | .853 |
| 2007 | United States | WJC | 5 | 4 | 1 | 0 | 313 | 9 | 0 | 1.72 | .935 |
| Junior totals | | | 13 | 11 | 1 | 0 | 742 | 22 | 1 | 1.78 | — |

== See also ==
- List of players who played only one game in the NHL
