= Dylan Yeo =

Canadian ice hockey player (born 1986)

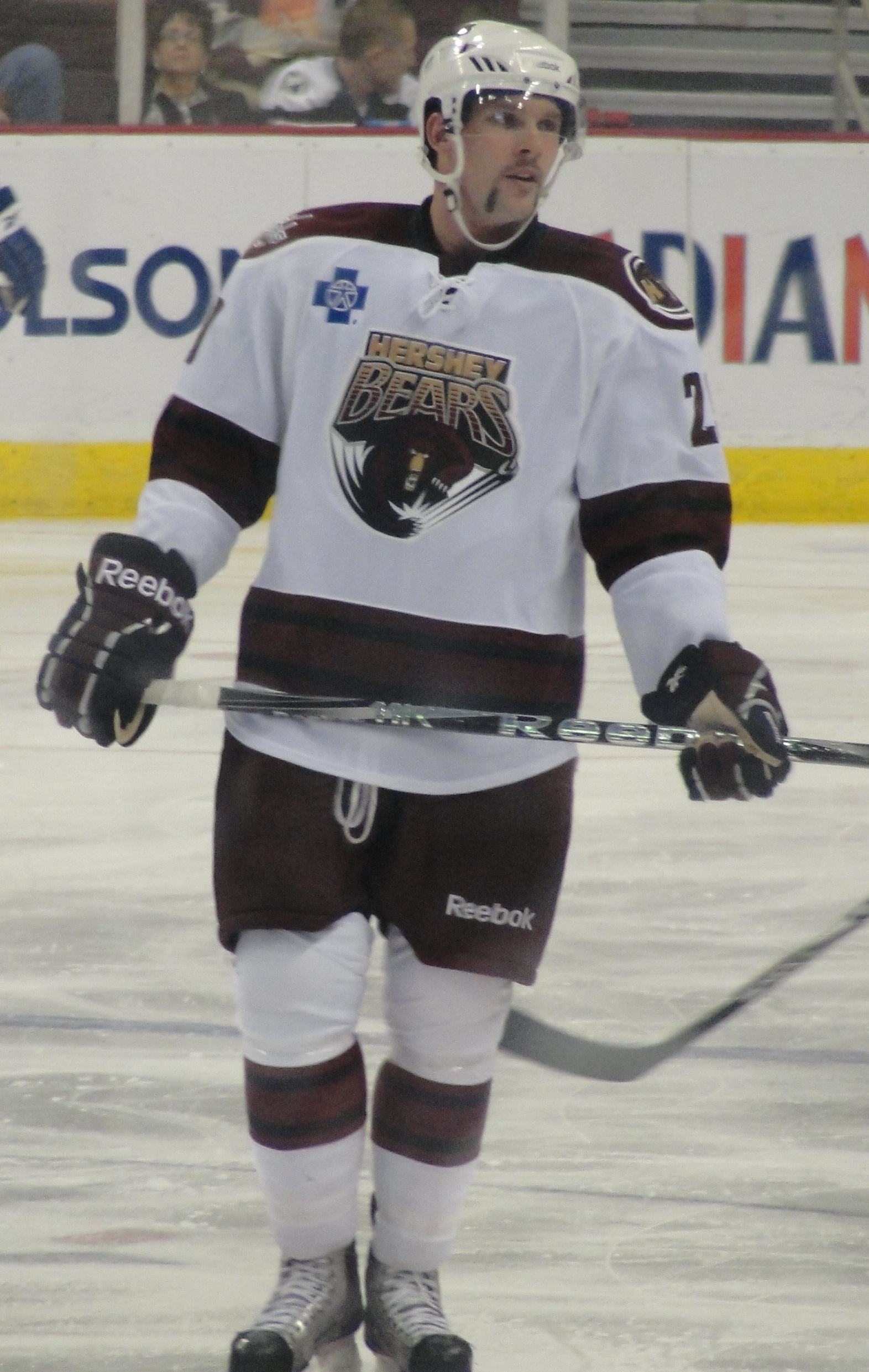
- Born: July 16, 1986 (age 39) Prince Albert, Saskatchewan, Canada
- Height: 5 ft 11 in (180 cm)
- Weight: 210 lb (95 kg; 15 st 0 lb)
- Position: Defence
- Shoots: Left
- DEL team Former teams: Dragons de Rouen; Manitoba Moose; Hershey Bears; Oklahoma City Barons; Toronto Marlies; Straubing Tigers; Iserlohn Roosters; Schwenninger Wild Wings
- NHL draft: Undrafted
- Playing career: 2007–present

Dylan Yeo (born July 16, 1986) is a Canadian professional ice hockey defenceman who currently plays for the Dragons de Rouen of the Ligue Magnus in France.

== Playing career ==
Yeo started his junior career with the Prince George Cougars of the Western Hockey League, where he played from 2003 to 2005, scoring a combined 20 points in goals and assists during regular season play.

From 2005 to 2007, Yeo skated with the Calgary Hitmen, also of the WHL. During the 2006–07 season, Yeo led the team's regular season plus-minus statistic with a +27. While with the Hitmen, he scored 53 points in combined goals and assists during regular season play, and netted 14 points during the post-season.

Yeo turned pro in 2007, moving to the ECHL's Victoria Salmon Kings, where he played from 2007 to 2009. While with the Salmon Kings, he scored 71 points during regular season play, with 7 points in the post-season. Yeo was also called up to the Manitoba Moose, Victoria's AHL affiliate, for 23 games, where he racked up 7 points in the regular season.

In 2009, Yeo moved to the South Carolina Stingrays. Early in the season, he was called up to the Hershey Bears, the Stingrays' AHL affiliate, for 2 games, after which he returned to the Stingrays. Yeo played 49 games with the Stingrays in the 2009–10 season, tallying 30 points in 14 goals and 16 assists in the regular season. That combined with the goal and assist Yeo netted in 5 games of the 2010 Kelly Cup playoffs made him the Stingrays' top-scoring defenceman. Following the Stingrays' elimination in the first round of the playoffs, Yeo was recalled to the Bears, playing 2 games and earning 5 penalty minutes in the 2010 Calder Cup playoffs. Hershey would ultimately win the Calder Cup that year.

Yeo re-signed with the Stingrays for the 2010–11 season, but was called up to Hershey early in the season.

On August 29, 2011, Yeo returned to the ECHL and signed a one-year deal with the Ontario Reign for the 2011–12 season. On November 23, 2011, Yeo was loaned to the Oklahoma City Barons and after consolidating a defensive role on January 25, 2012, Yeo was signed to an AHL contract with the Barons for the remainder of the year.

In compiling his best statistical AHL season and helping the Barons to the Western Conference finals, Yeo gained AHL interest and was signed to a one-year AHL contract with the Toronto Marlies on July 30, 2012.

On July 10, 2014, Yeo left the Marlies organization after two seasons and signed his first contract abroad on a one-year deal with German club, Straubing Tigers of the DEL.

Yeo established himself a regular top four defensive role in Germany with the Tigers. After four seasons with the club, Yeo left as a free agent and moved to fellow DEL club, the Iserlohn Roosters, on a one-year contract on June 26, 2018. In the 2018–19 season, Yeo made an immediate impact with the Roosters, recording his best season offensively in the DEL, with 10 goals and 37 points in 52 games.

On April 18, 2019, having concluded his contract with Iserlohn, Yeo agreed to a two-year contract to continue in the DEL with the Schwenninger Wild Wings.

== Personal ==
During his time with the Hitmen, Yeo once sang the Canadian national anthem before a game. In the 2009–10 season with the Stingrays, Yeo played with a pink hockey stick. The stick was raffled off with proceeds going to support the Susan G. Komen for the Cure breast cancer foundation.

Yeo is the nephew of former NHL defenseman Dave Manson, and the cousin of current NHL defenseman Josh Manson.

Contrary to popular belief, Yeo is not related to former NHL head coach Mike Yeo.

== Career statistics ==
			Regular season					Playoffs
Season	Team	League	GP	G	A	Pts	PIM	GP	G	A	Pts	PIM
2003–04	Prince George Cougars	WHL	53	2	13	15	41	—	—	—	—	—
2004–05	Prince George Cougars	WHL	35	2	3	5	59	—	—	—	—	—
2004–05	Calgary Hitmen	WHL	27	2	2	4	38	12	2	0	2	6
2005–06	Calgary Hitmen	WHL	56	7	11	18	78	—	—	—	—	—
2006–07	Calgary Hitmen	WHL	57	8	23	31	64	18	4	8	12	22
2007–08	Victoria Salmon Kings	ECHL	55	10	18	28	76	11	4	3	7	18
2007–08	Manitoba Moose	AHL	9	0	2	2	2	—	—	—	—	—
2008–09	Victoria Salmon Kings	ECHL	52	10	33	43	30	9	0	0	0	8
2008–09	Manitoba Moose	AHL	14	1	4	5	10	—	—	—	—	—
2009–10	Hershey Bears	AHL	4	0	1	1	6	2	0	0	0	5
2009–10	South Carolina Stingrays	ECHL	49	14	16	30	78	5	1	1	2	6
2010–11	South Carolina Stingrays	ECHL	10	2	2	4	18	4	1	2	3	2
2010–11	Hershey Bears	AHL	27	1	5	6	21	—	—	—	—	—
2011–12	Ontario Reign	ECHL	8	1	8	9	8	—	—	—	—	—
2011–12	Oklahoma City Barons	AHL	48	5	8	13	37	14	1	7	8	37
2012–13	Toronto Marlies	AHL	46	2	16	18	75	8	0	4	4	8
2013–14	Toronto Marlies	AHL	14	1	2	3	12	10	0	3	3	10
2013–14	Orlando Solar Bears	ECHL	4	0	1	1	2	—	—	—	—	—
2014–15	Straubing Tigers	DEL	49	7	16	23	68	—	—	—	—	—
2015–16	Straubing Tigers	DEL	52	8	21	29	82	6	0	2	2	4
2016–17	Straubing Tigers	DEL	44	10	15	25	76	2	0	0	0	8
2017–18	Straubing Tigers	DEL	51	11	12	23	76	—	—	—	—	—
2018–19	Iserlohn Roosters	DEL	52	10	27	37	106	—	—	—	—	—
2019–20	Schwenninger Wild Wings	DEL	51	3	11	14	56	—	—	—	—	—
2020-21	Schwenninger Wild Wings	DEL	31	0	6	6	28	—	—	—	—	—
2021-22	Dragons de Rouen	Ligue Magnus	42	6	21	27	86	8	1	2	3	6
2022-23	Dragons de Rouen	Ligue Magnus	42	11	20	31	126	16	4	4	8	31
AHL totals			162	10	38	48	163	34	1	14	15	60
ECHL totals			178	37	78	115	212	28	6	5	11	34
DEL totals			330	49	108	157	492	8	0	2	2	12

== Awards and honours ==
Award	Year
ECHL
All-Star Classic	2009
Defenseman of the Year	2009
All-ECHL First Team	2009
AHL
Calder Cup (Hershey Bears)	2010

== Records ==
Team or league	Stat	Year
Victoria Salmon Kings	Most goals by a defenceman during a playoff season (4)	2007-08
Victoria Salmon Kings	Most points by a defenceman during a playoff season (7)	2007-08
