= Kevin Baker (ice hockey) =

Canadian ice hockey player (born 1979)

- Born: June 15, 1979 (age 46) Kingston, Ontario, Canada
- Height: 6 ft 1 in (185 cm)
- Weight: 192 lb (87 kg; 13 st 10 lb)
- Position: Left wing
- Shot: Right
- Played for: AHL; Lowell Lock Monsters; Saint John Flames; Milwaukee Admirals; Toronto Marlies; Rochester Americans; Albany River Rats; ECHL; Johnstown Chiefs; Texas Wildcatters; Florida Everblades; Stockton Thunder; Orlando Solar Bears; Evansville IceMen; Quad City Mallards; CHL; Arizona Sundogs; 2. Bundesliga; Schwenninger Wild Wings; Elite.A; Ritten Sport
- NHL draft: 193rd overall, 1999; Los Angeles Kings
- Playing career: 2000–2015

Kevin Baker (born June 15, 1979) is a Canadian former professional ice hockey player who last played for the Quad City Mallards of the ECHL. He was selected by the Los Angeles Kings in the 7th round (193rd overall) of the 1999 NHL entry draft.

== Career ==
Baker played in the juniors for a season with the Trenton Sting of the OPJHL and three seasons with the Belleville Bulls of the OHL. In 2000, he turned professional with the Lowell Lock Monsters of the AHL. 2001–02 saw him moving between the AHL and the ECHL. Between 2002 and 2006, he attended Acadia University, where he played 3 seasons (in 2002–03, he sat out the mandatory season after turning professional). Since college, he has bounced between various leagues, spending more time in the ECHL and AHL, and 2 seasons in Europe, one in Germany playing for the Schwenninger Wild Wings of the 2. Bundesliga and one in Italy playing for Ritten Sport of the Serie A.

On July 1, 2014, he re-signed for a second full season with the Arizona Sundogs of the Central Hockey League. However, with the Sundogs folding and the discontinuance of the CHL, Baker signed with the Quad City Mallards of the ECHL.

== Career statistics ==
			Regular season					Playoffs
Season	Team	League	GP	G	A	Pts	PIM	GP	G	A	Pts	PIM
1997–98	Belleville Bulls	OHL	63	21	21	42	62	9	4	5	9	11
1998–99	Belleville Bulls	OHL	68	44	37	81	66	12	12	5	17	12
1999–00	Belleville Bulls	OHL	60	28	31	59	90	16	11	5	16	22
2000–01	Lowell Lock Monsters	AHL	26	6	5	11	18	—	—	—	—	—
2001–02	Johnstown Chiefs	ECHL	18	6	10	16	26	5	4	1	5	6
2001–02	Saint John Flames	AHL	46	13	7	20	20	—	—	—	—	—
2003–04	Acadia Univ.	CIS	21	10	6	16	36	—	—	—	—	—
2004–05	Acadia Univ.	CIS	28	24	16	40	16	—	—	—	—	—
2005–06	Acadia Univ.	CIS	28	24	23	47	26	—	—	—	—	—
2006–07	Texas Wildcatters	ECHL	62	36	45	81	76	10	6	4	10	20
2006–07	Milwaukee Admirals	AHL	2	0	3	3	0	—	—	—	—	—
2006–07	Toronto Marlies	AHL	7	2	0	2	0	—	—	—	—	—
2007–08	Schwenninger Wild Wings	2. GBun	23	8	8	16	18	—	—	—	—	—
2007–08	Texas Wildcatters	ECHL	44	29	27	56	23	9	5	2	7	12
2008–09	Florida Everblades	ECHL	70	57	45	102	66	11	3	5	8	8
2008–09	Rochester Americans	AHL	1	0	0	0	0	—	—	—	—	—
2009–10	Florida Everblades	ECHL	55	13	29	42	32	5	1	0	1	2
2009–10	Albany River Rats	AHL	1	0	0	0	0	—	—	—	—	—
2010–11	Ritten-Renon	ITL	39	15	21	36	50	4	2	4	6	6
2011–12	Stockton Thunder	ECHL	68	27	29	56	46	8	1	5	6	2
2012–13	Orlando Solar Bears	ECHL	18	4	5	9	26	—	—	—	—	—
2012–13	Evansville IceMen	ECHL	32	18	12	30	8	—	—	—	—	—
2012–13	Arizona Sundogs	CHL	10	8	6	14	6	4	0	0	0	2
2013–14	Arizona Sundogs	CHL	65	34	30	64	34	11	5	4	9	16
2014–15	Quad City Mallards	ECHL	59	22	28	50	42	7	3	2	5	4
ECHL totals			426	212	230	442	345	55	23	19	42	54
AHL totals			83	21	15	36	38	—	—	—	—	—

== Awards and honours ==
Award	Year
2005–2006	CIS Player of the year (Senator Joseph A. Sullivan trophy)
2006–2007	ECHL First All-Star Team
2006–2007	ECHL Player of the Month (December)
2006–2007	ECHL Player of the Week (10/30-11/05)
2008–2009	ECHL First All-Star Team
2008–2009	ECHL Most Points (102)
2008–2009	ECHL Most Valuable Player
2008–2009	ECHL Player of the Month (November)
2008–2009	ECHL Player of the Week (11/17-11/23)
2008–2009	ECHL Player of the Week (12/15-12/21)
