= Craig Valette =

Canadian ice hockey player

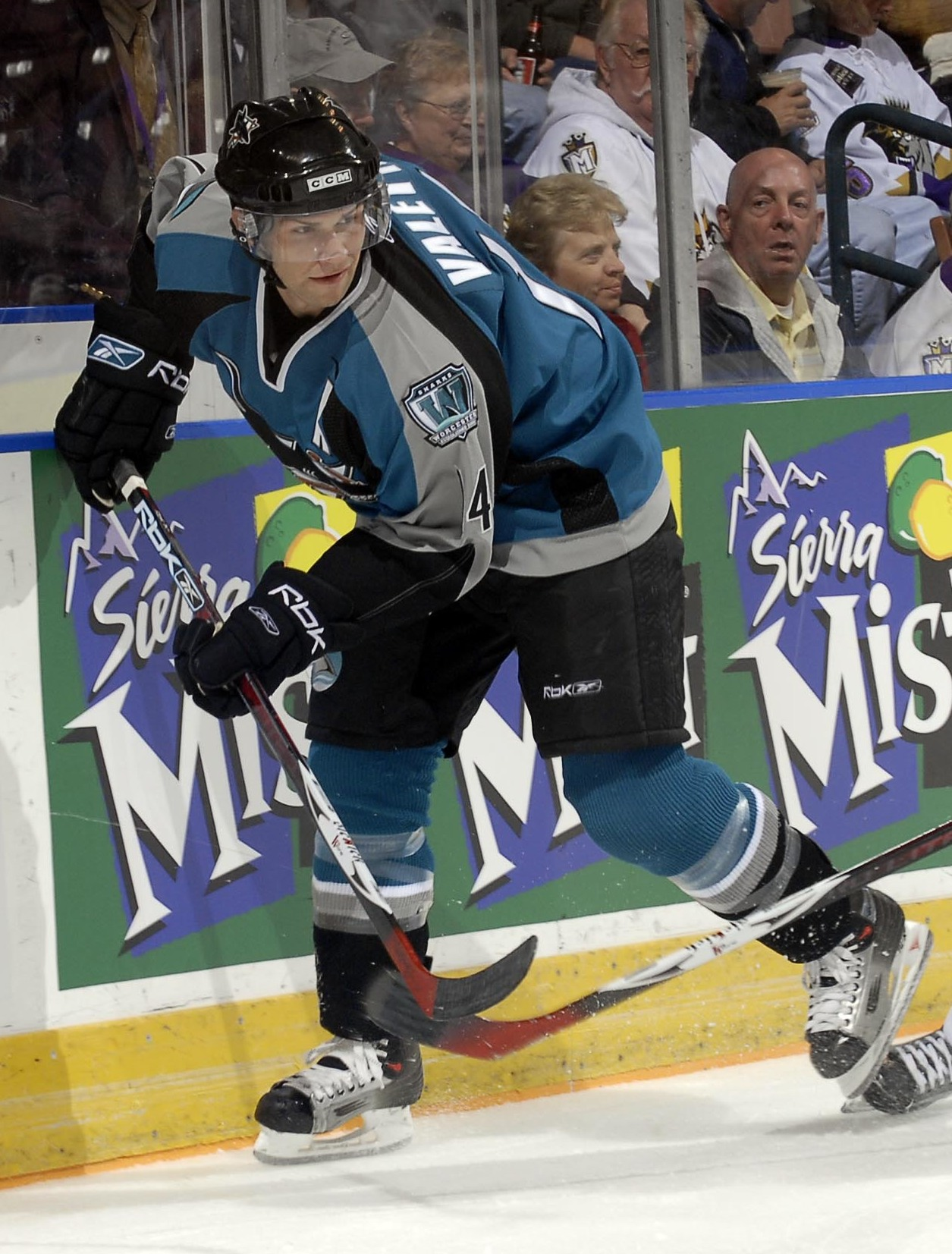
- Valette with the Worcester Sharks in 2006
- Born: October 7, 1982 (age 42); Canwood, Saskatchewan, Canada
- Height: 6 ft 0 in (183 cm)
- Weight: 200 lb (91 kg; 14 st 4 lb)
- Position: Forward
- Shot: Left
- Played for: Cleveland Barons; Worcester Sharks; Stockton Thunder; Houston Aeros; Syracuse Crunch
- NHL draft: Undrafted
- Playing career: 2003–2019

Craig Valette (born October 7, 1982) is a Canadian professional ice hockey forward who last played for the Stockton Thunder in the ECHL. He spent his junior career with the Saskatoon Blades and the Portland Winterhawks of the Western Hockey League. He was signed by the San Jose Sharks in 2003 and spent five seasons with their AHL affiliates (Cleveland Barons & Worcester Sharks) before joining the Stockton Thunder for the first of 3 stints in 2008.
