= Matthew Ford (ice hockey) =

American ice hockey player (born 1984)

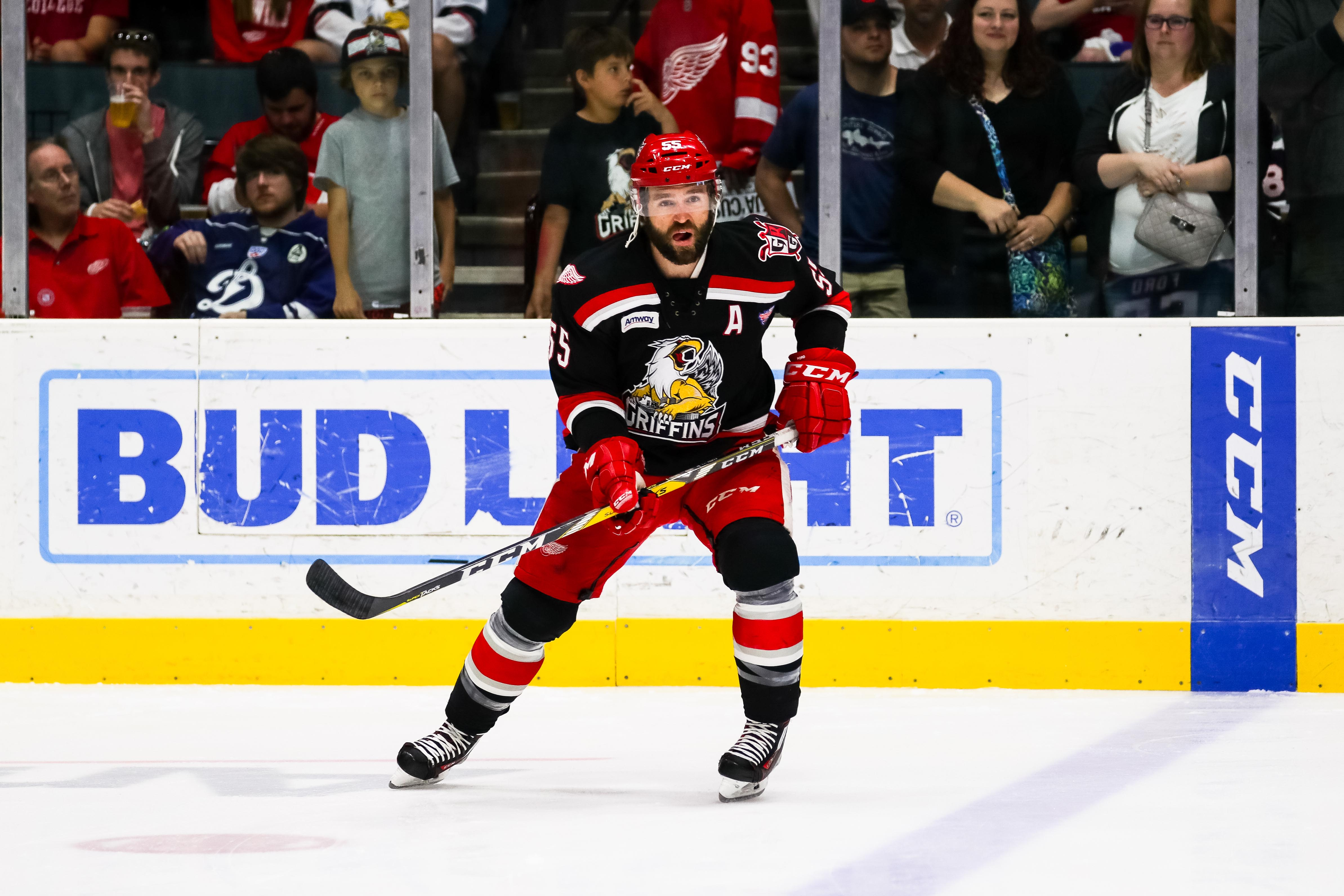
- Ford with the Grand Rapids Griffins in 2017
- Born: October 9, 1984 (age 41) Los Angeles, California, U.S.
- Height: 6 ft 1 in (185 cm)
- Weight: 214 lb (97 kg; 15 st 4 lb)
- Position: Right wing
- Shot: Right
- Played for: Hartford Wolf Pack; Lake Erie Monsters; Hershey Bears; Adirondack Phantoms; Springfield Falcons; Oklahoma City Barons; Bakersfield Condors; Grand Rapids Griffins
- NHL draft: 256th overall, 2004; Chicago Blackhawks
- Playing career: 2008–2020

Matthew Ford (born October 9, 1984) is an American former professional ice hockey forward who played most notably in the American Hockey League (AHL).

== Playing career ==
=== Amateur ===
Ford started his amateur career playing for the Sioux Falls Stampede of the United States Hockey League in the 2003–04 season. In 60 games, Ford posted an impressive 37 goals and 68 points to lead the Stampede and was consequently drafted in the eighth round, 256th overall, in the 2004 NHL entry draft by the Chicago Blackhawks. Ford then opted to continue his amateur career by enrolling to play collegiate hockey with the University of Wisconsin of the Western Collegiate Hockey Association the following season. Used as a role player within the Badgers, Ford never totaled more than 13 points in each of his four seasons, but helped Wisconsin win the National Championship as a sophomore in 2006.

=== Professional ===
Upon completion of his college career, and unsigned from the Blackhawks, Ford made his professional debut in the 2008–09 season with the Charlotte Checkers of the ECHL. He was signed to a professional try-out with AHL affiliate, the Hartford Wolf Pack, on November 6, 2008, before he was returned to the Checkers on December 8, 2008. Ford was selected to the American Conference team for the ECHL's All-Star game and following a three-goal, four point performance was named the All-Stars MVP on January 21. Enduring a second stint with the Wolf Pack in late January he compiled a combined 25 games, scoring one goal and two assists. On March 11, immediately after his second spell with Hartford was ended, Ford was signed to a P.T.O contract with fellow AHL team, the Lake Erie Monsters, going scoreless in five games. Ford returned to the Checkers to complete his season with 38 points in 28 regular season games and 5 points in 6 games during the playoffs.

In the 2009–10 season, Ford re-signed with the Charlotte Checkers, but played only 3 games before he was loaned back to Lake Erie on October 30, 2009. Remaining with the Monsters for the duration of the season, Ford posted 13 goals and 27 points in 45 games while also leading with a team-high Plus/Minus of +14.

Re-signed by Lake Erie prior to the 2010–11 campaign, he was invited on a try-out to participate in the Monsters NHL affiliate, the Colorado Avalanche, training camp on September 15, 2010, before returning to Cleveland to begin the season.

On July 1, 2011, Ford was signed to his first NHL contract, agreeing to a two-way one-year deal with the Washington Capitals. Assigned to the Capitals affiliate, the Hershey Bears, Ford scored 28 points in 39 games before he was traded by the Capitals to the Philadelphia Flyers in exchange for Kevin Marshall on February 2, 2012.

Ford was re-signed to a one-year extension with the Flyers on April 4, 2012. Assigned directly to affiliate, the Adirondack Phantoms, in the following 2012–13 season, he suffered from injury and a lack of production to post only 4 goals in 35 games with the Phantoms. On March 12, 2013, Ford was traded by the Flyers to the Columbus Blue Jackets for future considerations. He remained in the AHL to be immediately assigned to affiliate, the Springfield Falcons.

Released as a free agent by the Blue Jackets, Ford remained in the AHL signing a one-year contract with the Oklahoma City Barons on July 13, 2013. On July 2, 2015, Ford followed the Edmonton Oilers AHL affiliation, in signing a one-year AHL contract with the Bakersfield Condors for the 2015–16 season. Ford led the Condors with 27 goals and 51 points in 64 games.

==== Grand Rapids Griffins ====
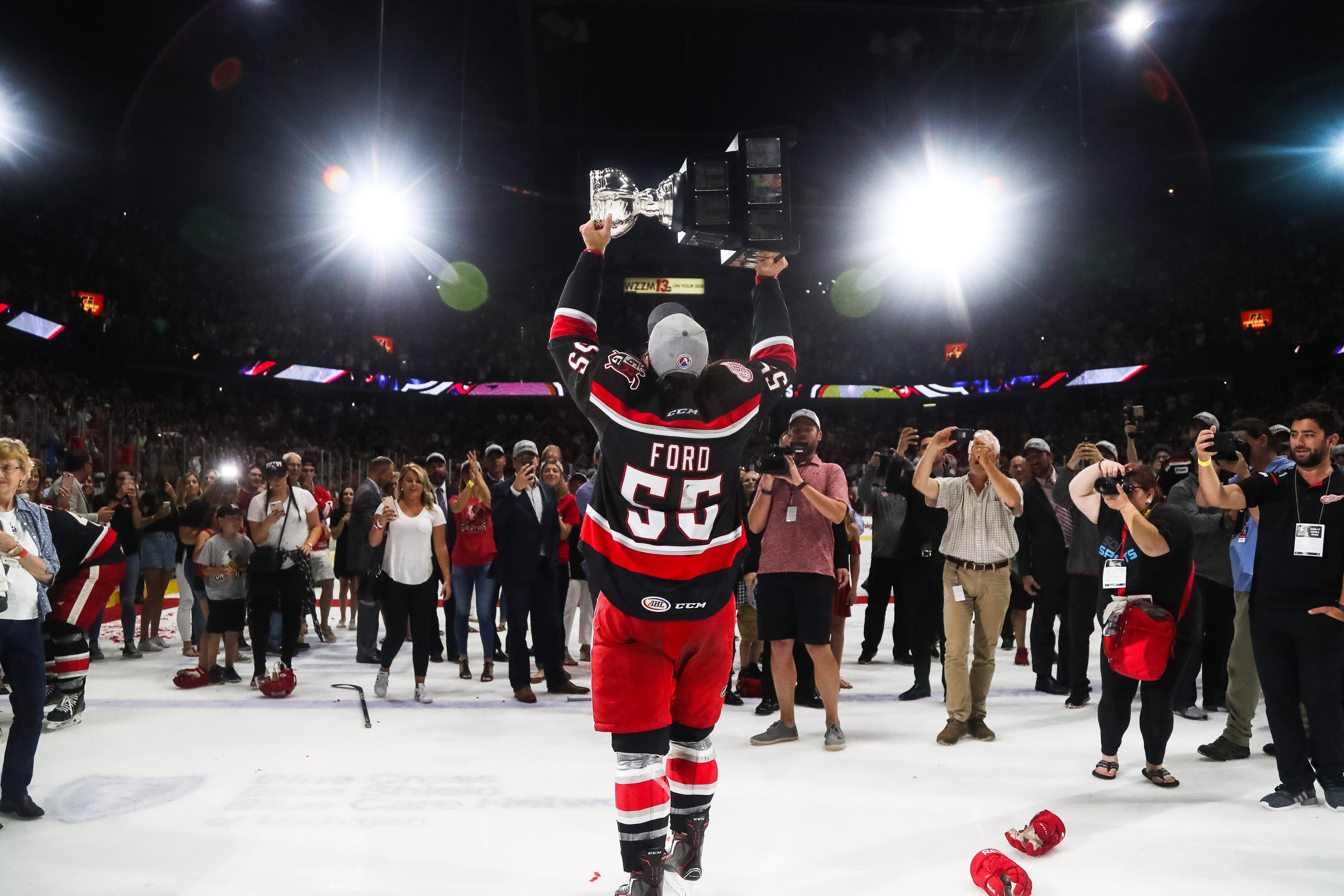
Ford hoisting the Calder Cup in 2017.

After three seasons within the Oilers AHL affiliates, Ford left as a free agent to add a veteran presence on a two-year AHL deal with the Grand Rapids Griffins, an affiliate to the Detroit Red Wings on July 12, 2016. During the 2017–18 season, Ford served as captain for the Griffins, where he recorded 22 goals and 16 assists in 72 games, ranking fourth on the team in goals and sixth in points. On June 26, 2018, the Grand Rapids Griffins signed Ford to a two-year contract extension.

On November 5, 2021, Ford officially announced his retirement after a twelve-year professional career having playing in 716 regular season AHL games.

== Career statistics ==
			Regular season					Playoffs
Season	Team	League	GP	G	A	Pts	PIM	GP	G	A	Pts	PIM
2001–02	Shattuck–Saint Mary's	MNJHL	13	13	13	26	10	—	—	—	—	—
2002–03	Shattuck–Saint Mary's	HSMN	58	37	52	89	44	—	—	—	—	—
2003–04	Sioux Falls Stampede	USHL	60	37	31	68	60	—	—	—	—	—
2004–05	University of Wisconsin	WCHA	21	5	5	10	18	—	—	—	—	—
2005–06	University of Wisconsin	WCHA	31	5	2	7	14	—	—	—	—	—
2006–07	University of Wisconsin	WCHA	39	7	6	13	38	—	—	—	—	—
2007–08	University of Wisconsin	WCHA	33	4	5	9	30	—	—	—	—	—
2008–09	Charlotte Checkers	ECHL	28	21	17	38	26	6	2	3	5	21
2008–09	Hartford Wolf Pack	AHL	25	1	2	3	10	—	—	—	—	—
2008–09	Lake Erie Monsters	AHL	5	0	0	0	2	—	—	—	—	—
2009–10	Charlotte Checkers	ECHL	3	0	2	2	6	—	—	—	—	—
2009–10	Lake Erie Monsters	AHL	45	13	14	27	28	—	—	—	—	—
2010–11	Lake Erie Monsters	AHL	76	26	16	42	46	7	3	1	4	8
2011–12	Hershey Bears	AHL	39	10	18	28	47	—	—	—	—	—
2011–12	Adirondack Phantoms	AHL	31	19	12	31	31	—	—	—	—	—
2012–13	Adirondack Phantoms	AHL	35	4	9	13	16	—	—	—	—	—
2012–13	Springfield Falcons	AHL	18	5	6	11	14	4	0	0	0	8
2013–14	Oklahoma City Barons	AHL	73	25	22	47	71	—	—	—	—	—
2014–15	Oklahoma City Barons	AHL	69	19	34	53	34	10	2	7	9	8
2015–16	Bakersfield Condors	AHL	64	27	24	51	60	—	—	—	—	—
2016–17	Grand Rapids Griffins	AHL	51	14	21	35	28	19	8	4	12	24
2017–18	Grand Rapids Griffins	AHL	72	22	16	38	42	5	2	3	5	10
2018–19	Grand Rapids Griffins	AHL	61	11	13	24	49	—	—	—	—	—
2019–20	Grand Rapids Griffins	AHL	52	10	17	27	33	—	—	—	—	—
AHL totals			716	206	224	430	511	45	15	15	30	58

== Awards and honors ==
Award	Year
USHL
Rookie of the Year	2004
AHL
Calder Cup (Grand Rapids Griffins)	2017
