= Bryan Ewing =

American ice hockey player

- Born: January 23, 1985 (age 40); Wheeling, West Virginia, U.S.
- Height: 5 ft 10 in (178 cm)
- Weight: 175 lb (79 kg; 12 st 7 lb)
- Position: Center
- Shot: Right
- Played for: Wheeling Nailers; Toledo Walleye; Reading Royals; Wilkes-Barre/Scranton Penguins; Rockford IceHogs; Springfield Falcons
- Playing career: 2008–2010

Bryan "Boomer" Ewing (born January 23, 1985) is an American former professional ice hockey player who last played for the Rockford IceHogs of the American Hockey League. Ewing began his professional career in 2008 with the Wheeling Nailers of the ECHL.

== Playing career ==
Bryan Ewing attended Duxbury High School and Cushing Academy in Ashburnham, Massachusetts, graduating from the latter. He was named a Second Team New England All-Star as a senior. After graduation, he enrolled at Boston University and played there for four seasons. He had his most success during his senior season when he led the team in assists, finished second in goals and points, and was named an NCAA Second Team All-American.

On August 28, 2008, Ewing signed a one-year, two-way AHL/ECHL contract with the Wilkes-Barre/Scranton Penguins for the 2008-09 season. He was cut from Wilkes-Barre/Scranton's training camp and assigned to Wheeling on October 3, 2008, and began the season with the Nailers. He scored his first professional point with an assist against the Cincinnati Cyclones on October 17, 2008, and scored his first professional goal against the Dayton Bombers on October 31, 2009. He was called up to Wilkes-Barre/Scranton on February 8, 2009 and made his AHL debut that night against the Norfolk Admirals. He was quickly returned to Wheeling and spent most of the rest of the season there. Ewing led Wheeling in goals, points, power play goals, and short handed goals, and tied for the team lead in assists. He finished the season second in the ECHL in scoring with 91 points, the most by a Wheeling player since 1996-97. Ewing was named as a reserve to the ECHL American Conference All-Star Team, and had a goal and two assists in that game. He was selected as a member of the 2008-09 ECHL All-Rookie Team and All-ECHL First Team, and was named CCM ECHL Rookie of the Year.

On July 29, 2009, Ewing was signed as a free agent on a one-year deal to the Rockford IceHogs of the AHL. After starting the 2009-10 season with the IceHogs Ewing was assigned to ECHL affiliate, the Toledo Walleye, after 9 games. Despite scoring 21 points in 26 games with Toledo Ewing was released from his contract and signed by fellow ECHL team the Reading Royals on January 14, 2010. Posting an impressive 8 points in his first six games with the Royals, Ewing returned to the AHL on loan for a solitary game with the Springfield Falcons on January 29, 2010.

== Career statistics ==
			Regular season					Playoffs
Season	Team	League	GP	G	A	Pts	PIM	GP	G	A	Pts	PIM
2004–05	Boston University	HE	29	6	8	14	12	—	—	—	—	—
2005–06	Boston University	HE	40	16	10	26	26	—	—	—	—	—
2006–07	Boston University	HE	35	9	16	25	38	—	—	—	—	—
2007–08	Boston University	HE	39	17	26	43	46	—	—	—	—	—
2008–09	Wheeling Nailers	ECHL	67	43	48	91	56	7	3	5	8	12
2008–09	Wilkes-Barre/Scranton Penguins	AHL	3	0	0	0	4	—	—	—	—	—
2009–10	Rockford IceHogs	AHL	9	1	1	2	4	—	—	—	—	—
2009–10	Toledo Walleye	ECHL	26	8	13	21	41	—	—	—	—	—
2009–10	Reading Royals	ECHL	22	9	6	15	16	—	—	—	—	—
2009–10	Springfield Falcons	AHL	1	0	0	0	0	—	—	—	—	—
AHL totals			13	1	1	2	8	—	—	—	—	—

== Awards and honors ==
Award	Year
All-Hockey East First Team	2007–08
AHCA East Second-Team All-American	2007-08

== Notes and references ==
Awards and achievements
Preceded by John Curry	Hockey East Three-Stars Award; 2007–08	Succeeded by Brad Thiessen
Preceded by Brian Boyle	Hockey East Scoring Champion; 2007–08	Succeeded by Colin Wilson; James Marcou
