= Gerald Coleman =

American ice hockey player (born 1985)

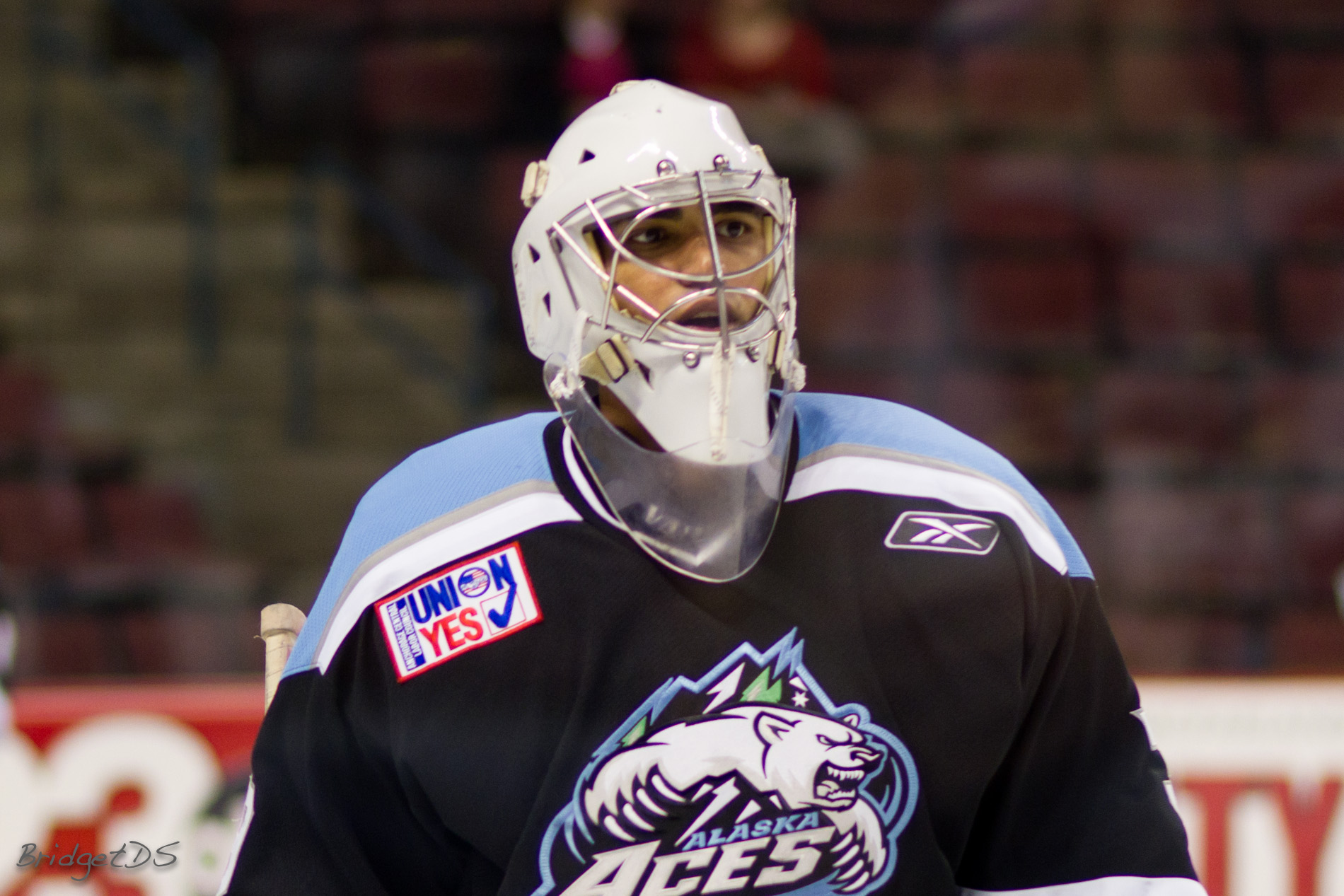
- Born: April 3, 1985 (age 41) Romeoville, Illinois, U.S.
- Height: 6 ft 5 in (196 cm)
- Weight: 214 lb (97 kg; 15 st 4 lb)
- Position: Goaltender
- Caught: Left
- Played for: Tampa Bay Lightning
- NHL draft: 224th overall, 2003; Tampa Bay Lightning
- Playing career: 2005–2014

Gerald Coleman (born April 3, 1985) is an American former professional ice hockey goaltender who played in the National Hockey League for the Tampa Bay Lightning. He predominantly played in the minor leagues, most notably with the Alaska Aces of the ECHL.

== Playing career ==
Coleman was drafted 224th overall by the Tampa Bay Lightning in the 2003 NHL entry draft. Selected from the London Knights of the Ontario Hockey League, Coleman was awarded the Dave Pinkney Trophy on his way to capturing the Memorial Cup the following season in 2003–04. He is the first graduate of the NHL Diversity Program to be drafted and to play in the NHL, making his debut for the Lightning, in relief, on November 11, 2005.

On February 24, 2007, Coleman was traded with a 1st round draft pick to the Anaheim Ducks for Shane O'Brien and a 3rd round draft pick. He was then assigned to the Ducks AHL affiliate, the Portland Pirates.

Coleman attended the Chicago Wolves training camp for the 2008–09 season, before he was released. After starting the year in the ECHL with the Phoenix RoadRunners, Coleman was recalled to the Worcester Sharks but upon his return was traded to the Trenton Devils on November 21, 2008. Coleman was then credited as a major influence in the turn around Trenton Devils season going 27-8-2 for the remainder of the year.

Coleman was then invited to the New Jersey Devils training camp for the 2009–10 before he was reassigned to AHL affiliate, the Lowell Devils. Coleman appeared in just three games with Lowell before he returned to Trenton for the season.

After attending the St. Louis Blues training camp, Coleman played the 2010–11 season with the Alaska Aces, posting a 2.19 GAA and a save percentage of .913, earning a record of 30-15-1-0 with 4 shutouts. In the Kelly Cup Playoffs, Coleman, along with the rest of the Aces set a playoff record with a 12-1 record to capture the cup. Coleman earned 11 of those 12 wins and did so with a .938 save percentage and a 1.73 GAA and 3 shutouts. In the end, Coleman lead the Alaska Aces win their second Brabham Cup and second Kelly Cup in franchise history. The Alaska Aces are also the only team to win the Brabham Cup and Kelly cup in the same year twice. He also captured goaltender of the year.

Coleman returned to the Aces the following season and after 23 games was signed to a professional try-out by the Lake Erie Monsters of the AHL. Coleman enjoyed a prominent role with the Monsters, winning 11 of 17 games before returning to the Aces to finish a second consecutive year with the lowest goals against average in the ECHL.

With off-season surgery and a forecasted lengthy recovery limiting interest from the AHL, Coleman re-signed with the Aces for his third season with the club on July 12, 2012.

After his fourth season with the Aces, and backstopping the club to their second Kelly Cup Championship in his successful tenure, Coleman retired from professional hockey due to persisting hip injuries on August 1, 2014. He intended to pursue studies in physical therapy.

== Career statistics ==
			Regular season										Playoffs
Season	Team	League	GP	W	L	T	OTL	MIN	GA	SO	GAA	SV%	GP	W	L	MIN	GA	SO	GAA	SV%
2002–03	London Knights	OHL	26	6	9	3	—	1074	59	1	3.30	.892	—	—	—	—	—	—	—	—
2003–04	London Knights	OHL	33	24	8	0	—	1852	68	5	2.20	.931	8	5	2	442	19	1	2.58	9.12
2004–05	London Knights	OHL	38	32	2	2	—	2224	63	8	1.70	.941	8	7	1	455	13	0	1.71	.935
2005–06	Springfield Falcons	AHL	43	14	21	—	3	2413	156	2	3.88	.880	—	—	—	—	—	—	—	—
2005–06	Tampa Bay Lightning	NHL	2	0	0	—	1	43	2	0	2.79	.882	—	—	—	—	—	—	—	—
2006–07	Springfield Falcons	AHL	3	2	1	—	0	179	6	0	2.01	.940	—	—	—	—	—	—	—	—
2006–07	Johnstown Chiefs	ECHL	17	7	9	—	0	914	52	0	3.41	.902	—	—	—	—	—	—	—	—
2006–07	Portland Pirates	AHL	11	4	5	—	0	603	29	0	2.89	.895	—	—	—	—	—	—	—	—
2007–08	Portland Pirates	AHL	18	8	6	—	2	968	47	2	2.91	.896	1	0	0	39	4	0	6.09	.789
2007–08	Augusta Lynx	ECHL	9	2	5	—	0	500	22	0	2.64	.902	—	—	—	—	—	—	—	—
2008–09	Phoenix RoadRunners	ECHL	4	2	1	—	1	244	6	1	1.48	.950	—	—	—	—	—	—	—	—
2008–09	Worcester Sharks	AHL	3	0	2	—	0	112	6	0	3.23	.854	—	—	—	—	—	—	—	—
2008–09	Trenton Devils	ECHL	40	27	8	—	2	2322	92	3	2.38	.915	3	1	2	246	15	0	3.66	.888
2009–10	Lowell Devils	AHL	3	1	2	—	0	182	13	0	4.28	.873	—	—	—	—	—	—	—	—
2009–10	Trenton Devils	ECHL	30	11	9	—	7	1563	94	0	3.61	.887	—	—	—	—	—	—	—	—
2010–11	Alaska Aces	ECHL	47	30	15	—	1	2735	100	4	2.19	.913	12	11	1	729	21	3	1.73	.938
2011–12	Alaska Aces	ECHL	27	18	5	—	4	1644	53	1	1.93	.926	10	5	5	569	19	1	2.00	.925
2011–12	Lake Erie Monsters	AHL	17	11	4	—	2	963	41	0	2.56	.922	—	—	—	—	—	—	—	—
2012–13	Alaska Aces	ECHL	32	23	6	—	3	1907	69	2	2.17	.918	9	4	5	548	21	0	2.30	.911
2013–14	Alaska Aces	ECHL	25	14	6	—	5	1504	60	2	2.39	.910	14	10	4	814	18	2	1.33	.942
NHL totals			2	0	0	—	1	43	2	0	2.79	.882	—	—	—	—	—	—	—	—

== Awards and honors ==
Award	Year
OHL
Dave Pinkney Trophy	2004, 2005
Third All-Star Team	2005
CHL Memorial Cup (London Knights)	2005
ECHL
Second All-Star Team	2009
First All-Star Team	2011
Goaltender of the Year	2011
Kelly Cup (Alaska Aces)	2011, 2014
