= Alexandre Imbeault =

Canadian ice hockey player

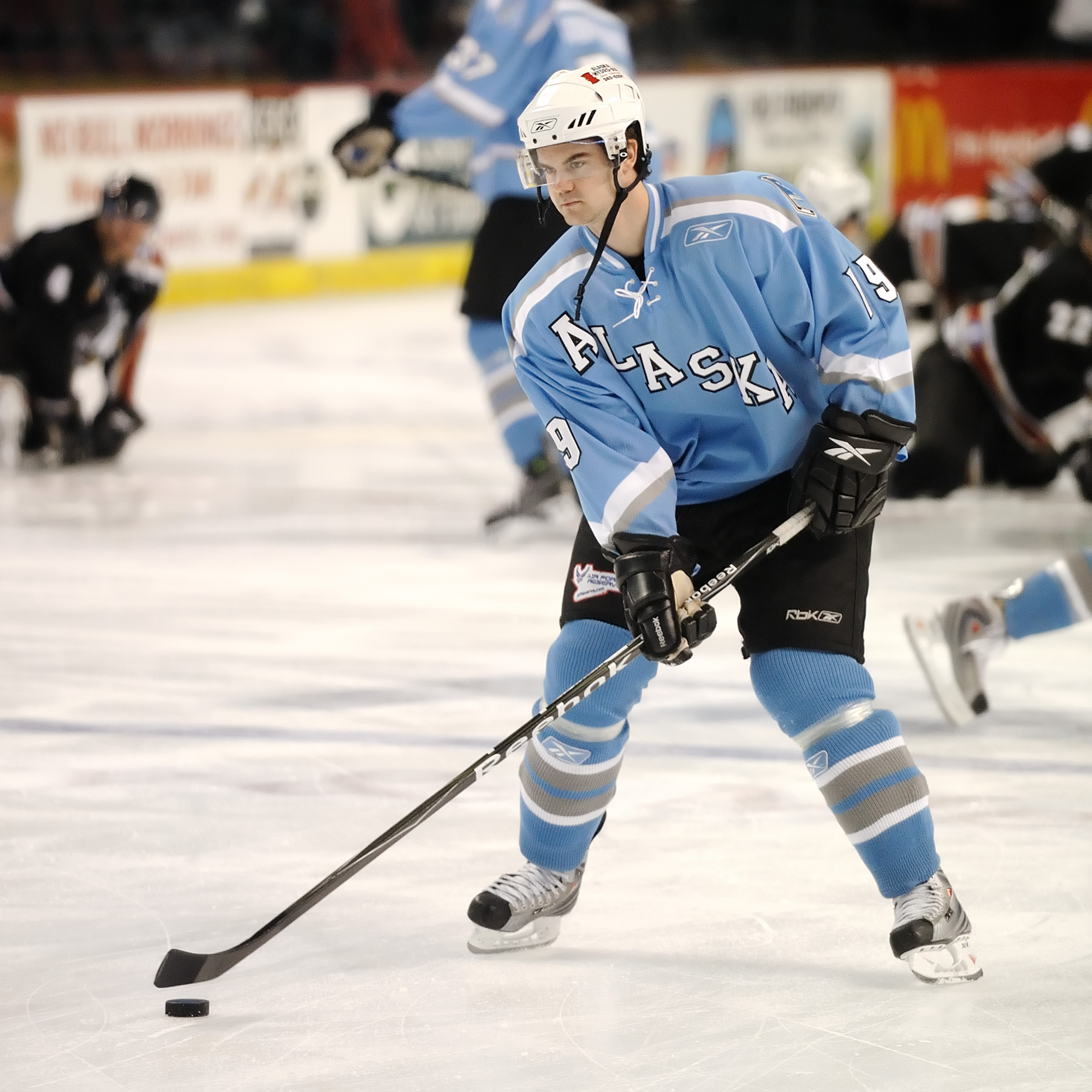
- Imbeault in 2009 with the Alaska Aces
- Born: June 25, 1986 (age 39) Montreal, Quebec, Canada
- Height: 6 ft 0 in (183 cm)
- Weight: 180 lb (82 kg; 12 st 12 lb)
- Position: Center
- Shoots: Right
- ECHL team Former teams: Orlando Solar Bears; Alaska Aces; Florida Everblades; Connecticut Whale; Johnstown Chiefs; Ljubljana Olimpija HK; Peoria Rivermen; Providence Bruins; Saguenay Marquis; Slavia Praha HC; Stavanger Oilers
- NHL draft: undrafted
- Playing career: 2007–present

Alexandre Imbeault (born June 25, 1986) is a Canadian former professional ice hockey player.

== Career ==
After a four-year stint in the QMJHL, Imbeault turned professional in 2007 with the Johnstown Chiefs of the ECHL. Despite only playing fifty-six of a possible seventy-two games, Imbeault finished the season with the team lead in goals (26) and finished second in points with sixty-two points. Imbeault also split time with the Providence Bruins of the American Hockey League, scoring seven points in twelve games during the 2007-08 AHL season.

Imbeault joined the Alaska Aces during the 2008-09 ECHL season, where he continued his role as one of the team's leading goal scorers. He finished tied for third with twenty goals and was one of the team's top scorers during the playoffs. Imbeault finished the post-season with nineteen points in twenty games as the Aces reached the Finals, but lost to the South Carolina Stingrays in a seven-game series.

From 2010 to 2012, Imbeault played in several leagues, ranging from Canada, Czech Republic, Norway, along with several stops in the AHL and the ECHL.

Imbeault started the 2012–13 season with the Ljubljana Olimpija HK in Austria, but after three games he was released on September 17, 2012. About two weeks later, Imbeault was signed by the Orlando Solar Bears on September 30, 2012.

== Awards and accomplishments ==
- 2007–08: ECHL Player Of The Week (February 25 – March 2, 2008)
- 2007–08: Leading goal scorer, Johnstown Chiefs (26)
- 2011–12: GET-ligaen playoff champion, Stavanger Oilers
