= Atlanta Gladiators =

Professional minor league ice hockey team

- City: Duluth, Georgia
- League: ECHL
- Conference: Eastern
- Division: South
- Founded: 1995
- Home arena: Gas South Arena
- Colors: Maroon, Black, White
- Owners: ATL Hockey Group, LLC; Alex Campbell (majority) and Anson Carter (minority)
- Head coach: Matt Ginn
- Media: ECHL.TV (Internet); 680 The Fan
- Affiliates: Nashville Predators (NHL); Milwaukee Admirals (AHL)
- Website: atlantagladiators.com

Franchise history
- 1995–2002: Mobile Mysticks
- 2003–2015: Gwinnett Gladiators
- 2015–present: Atlanta Gladiators

Championships
- Division titles: 3 (2005–06, 2011–12, 2012–13)
- Conference titles: 1 (2005–06)

The Atlanta Gladiators are a professional minor league ice hockey team based in the Atlanta metropolitan area. The Gladiators play in the South Division of the ECHL's Eastern Conference. They play their home games at Gas South Arena, approximately 22 miles (35 km) northeast of Atlanta.

The franchise originated as the Mobile Mysticks in 1995. They suspended operations in 2002 and moved to Duluth in 2003 where they were originally known as the Gwinnett Gladiators. In 2015, they changed their name to the Atlanta Gladiators. They were the South Division and American Conference champions in 2006, falling four-games-to-one to the Alaska Aces in the Kelly Cup finals.

== History ==
=== Birth of the Gladiators ===
The franchise originated as the Mobile Mysticks who played in Mobile, Alabama, from 1995 to 2002. It suspended operations in 2002 due to declining attendance. After a year off, Toby Jeffreys, the owner of the Mysticks, relocated his franchise to Gwinnett County, Georgia, in 2003 and was rebranded the Gwinnett Gladiators. He then sold minority stakes of the franchise to local business owners to create Gwinnett County Hockey, LLC. Jeff Pyle—who served as the Mysticks' head coach starting in 1998—returned to the franchise for their first season.

The Gladiators made an appearance in the 2006 Kelly Cup Finals, losing to the Alaska Aces in five games.

On July 13, 2011, Pyle was named head coach of the American Hockey League's Texas Stars. The Gladiators announced on August 3, 2011, that John Wroblewski, former assistant coach for the Wheeling Nailers, had been selected to take Pyle's place as the team's head coach. The Gladiators won the ECHL South Division in the two years of Wrobelski's tenure.

On August 7, 2013, Wroblewski was hired by the AHL's Rochester Americans as an assistant coach. Rick Emmett, a former defenseman for the Gladiators, took over as head coach.

Emmett was relieved of his duties as head coach on December 2, 2014. At the time, assistant coach, and former Gladiator captain, Andy Brandt was named the interim head coach. Brandt would remain the interim head coach through the remainder of the 2014–15 season before being named to head coach on March 21, 2015. Former Valpellice Bulldogs head coach Mike Flanagan also joined the coaching staff in December 2014, serving as the team's assistant coach.

=== Rebranding as Atlanta Gladiators ===
Following the 2014–15 season, the Gladiators became the affiliate of the Boston Bruins and their AHL affiliate, the Providence Bruins. On September 9, 2015, the Gladiators organization announced that they would be known as the Atlanta Gladiators to expand their brand to include the entire Atlanta metropolitan area. As part of the name change, the Gladiators updated their “primary” and “wordmark” logos to reflect the Atlanta designation. The rest of the Gladiators logos remained the same, as did the team colors.

After two seasons as head coach, Andy Brandt left to take the associate coaching position with St. Norbert College in 2017. The Gladiators would then hire two-time Kelly Cup winning coach Chuck Weber as his replacement.

During the 2017–18 season, the franchise was purchased by Virginia-based ownership group called Danor Vienna LLC, headed by real estate developer P. Daniel Orlich. Head coach Weber left after one season to take an assistant coaching position with Rensselaer Polytechnic Institute (RPI) NCAA Div. I men's team in order to be closer to home. Jeff Pyle was then brought back as head coach and general manager after leaving for the AHL in 2011.

In 2019, the Gladiators updated their primary colors from garnet and black to navy blue and gold.

On October 1, 2020, due to the COVID-19 pandemic the Gladiators enacted the ECHL's COVID-19 voluntary suspension policy and opted out of playing in the 2020–21 season. The team announced they would return to play in the 2021–22 season.

Prior to the start of the 2022–23 season on October 19, 2022, ownership of the team was transferred to ATL Hockey Group, LLC, led by businessman Alex Campbell with former NHL player and NHL on TNT commentator Anson Carter holding a minority stake. On November 7, 2022, the Gladiators unveiled plans to take on the identity of the former Atlanta Thrashers for a single game on December 16 against the Greenville Swamp Rabbits.

On June 6, 2023, the Gladiators announced former team captain Derek Nesbitt as the sixth head coach in team history. Jeff Pyle, who had served as the team's head coach for the previous four seasons, was promoted to Director of Hockey Operations for the club.

On May 7, 2025, the Gladiators announced assistant coach Matt Ginn as the seventh head coach in team history, as well as Director of Hockey Operations for the club. Derek Nesbitt, who had served as the team's head coach for the previous two seasons, was promoted to Director of Community Engagement for the club.

== Affiliations ==
The Gladiators served as the ECHL affiliate of the NHL's Atlanta Thrashers and their AHL affiliate Chicago Wolves from their inception in 2003 until 2011, when the Thrashers franchise moved to Winnipeg and the Gladiators ended their affiliation with the franchise. The team also served as an affiliate for the Chicago Blackhawks during the 2008–09 season and for the Columbus Blue Jackets during the 2009–10 season.

On August 17, 2011, the Gladiators announced their affiliation with the Phoenix Coyotes and the Portland Pirates for the 2011–12 season. They later announced an affiliation agreement with the Buffalo Sabres, and their AHL affiliate, the Rochester Americans. That affiliation lapsed at the end of the 2011–12 season, leaving the Gladiators affiliated exclusively with Phoenix for the 2012–13 season. The Gladiators would carry that affiliation through the end of the 2014–15 season.

On August 6, 2015, the Gladiators announced a two-year affiliation deal with the Boston Bruins and their AHL affiliate, the Providence Bruins. In February 2017, the Gladiators and Bruins extended their affiliation for another two seasons and then added fifth season for 2019–20. In 2021, the Bruins switched their ECHL affiliation to the Maine Mariners and the Gladiators affiliated with the Ottawa Senators.

On August 25, 2022, the Gladiators became the ECHL affiliate for the Arizona Coyotes for the second time.

On June 6, 2023, the Gladiators became the ECHL affiliate for the NHL's Nashville Predators and AHL's Milwaukee Admirals.

== Season-by-season record ==
Regular season										Playoffs					
Season	GP	W	L	OTL	SOL	Pts	GF	GA	Standing	Year	Wild Card Round Conf. 1st round (2006–08)^{§}	1st round Conf. Quarterfinals	2nd round Conf. Semifinals	3rd round Conf. Finals	Kelly Cup
2003–04	72	42	22	0	8	92	248	193	3rd, Central	2004	No WC game in Western Conf.	W, 3–2, MIS	W, 3–1, LOU	L, 1–3, IDA	—
2004–05	72	40	24	1	7	88	241	202	3rd, South	2005	—	W, 3–1, MIS	L, 1–3, CHR	—	—
2005–06	72	50	15	0	7	107	304	208	1st, South	2006	BYE	W, 3–0, SC	W, 3–1, FLA	W, 4–1, TOL	L, 1–4, AK
2006–07	72	41	24	5	2	89	289	256	3rd, South	2007	BYE	L, 1–3, TX	—	—	—
2007–08	72	44	23	2	3	93	247	198	3rd, South	2008	W, 3–0, CHR	L, 2–3, SC	—	—	—
2008–09	72	31	35	1	5	68	214	246	4th, South	2009	—	L, 1–4, FLA	—	—	—
2009–10	72	31	33	5	3	70	243	277	4th, South	2010	—	Did not qualify			
2010–11	72	30	34	3	5	68	203	250	4th, South	2011	—	Did not qualify			
2011–12	72	41	20	7	4	93	214	200	1st, South	2012	—	L, 1–3, SC	—	—	—
2012–13	72	43	26	2	1	89	211	191	1st, South	2013	—	W, 4–0, SC	L, 2–4, CIN	—	—
2013–14	72	29	38	3	2	63	203	227	5th, South	2014	—	Did not qualify			
2014–15	72	20	45	3	4	47	174	263	7th, East	2015	—	Did not qualify			
2015–16	72	34	31	5	2	75	189	224	4th, South	2016	—	Did not qualify			
2016–17	72	27	37	6	2	62	234	278	6th, South	2017	—	Did not qualify			
2017–18	72	32	35	2	3	69	205	229	4th, South	2018	—	L, 0–4, FLA	—	—	—
2018–19	72	31	30	8	3	73	197	211	5th, South	2019	—	Did not qualify			
2019–20	61	29	28	2	2	62	200	230	4th, South	2020	—	Season cancelled			
2020–21	Opted out of participating due to the COVID-19 pandemic									2021	did not participate				
2021–22	72	43	24	4	1	91	220	198	2nd, South	2022	—	L, 0–4, JAX	—	—	—
2022–23	72	35	30	6	1	91	226	240	6th, South	2023	—	Did not qualify			
2023–24	72	23	45	3	1	50	187	264	7th, South	2024	—	Did not qualify			
2024–25	72	28	35	7	2	65	188	248	6th, South	2025	—	Did not qualify			
2025–26	72	44	23	4	1	93	209	183	3rd, South	2026	—	L, 2–4, SC	—	—	—

- ^{§}The ECHL used an unbalanced playoff format from the 1998–99 season to the 2003–04 season and again from the 2005–06 season to the 2007–08 season which resulted in five rounds.

== Players ==
=== Notable players ===
- Matt Anderson
- Adam Berkhoel
- Cam Brown
- Kevin Doell
- Louis Domingue
- Mike Dunham
- Chris Durno

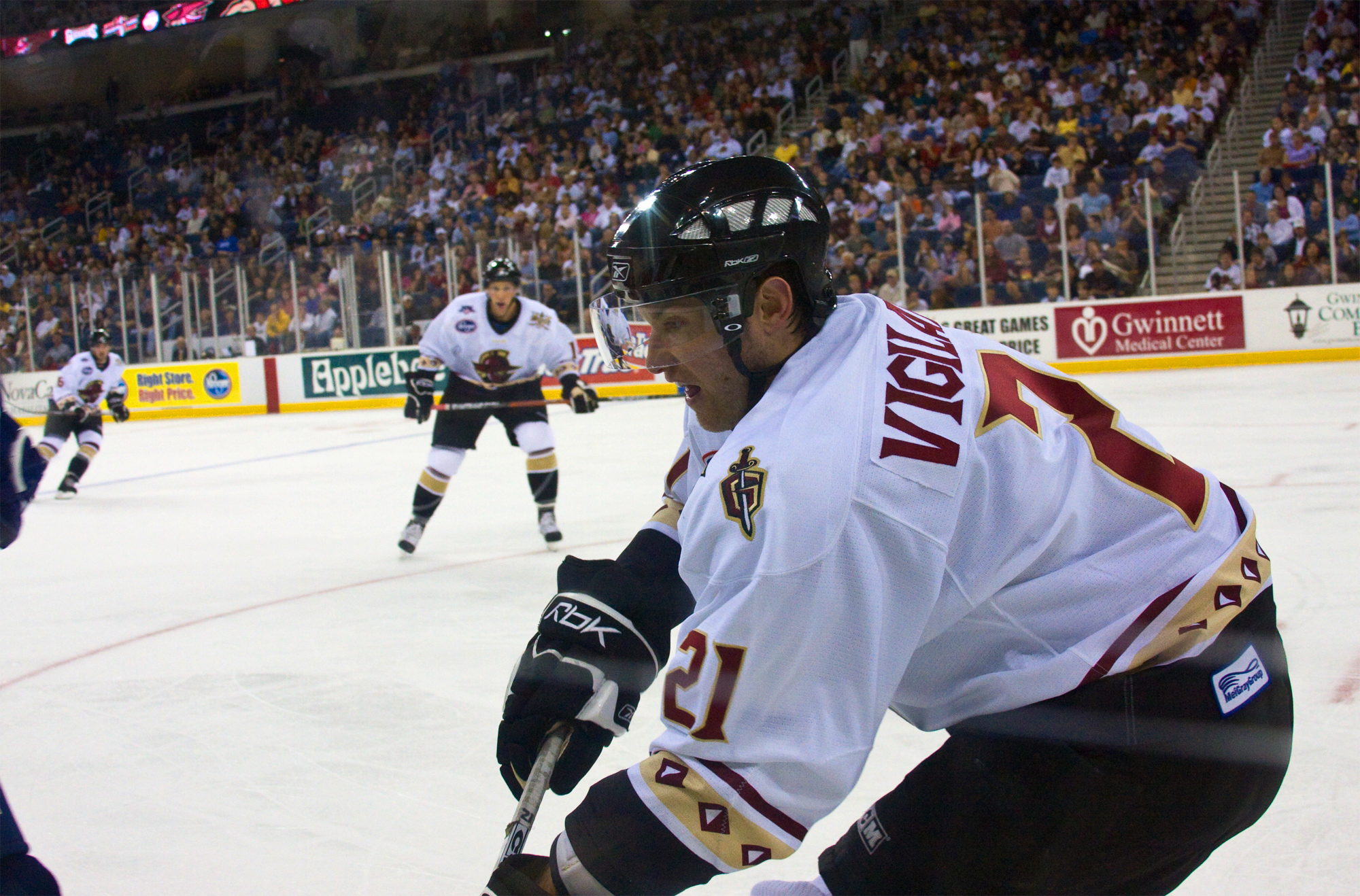
Atlanta Gladiators vs. Pensacola Ice Pilots (circa 2005)

- Patrick Dwyer
- Ryan Garbutt
- Michael Garnett
- Simon Lajeunesse
- Mike Lee
- Adam Munro
- Derek Nesbitt
- Pascal Pelletier
- Daniel Vladar
