= Ryan Huddy =

Canadian ice hockey player

- Born: August 28, 1983 (age 42) Stony Plain, Alberta, Canada
- Height: 5 ft 9 in (175 cm)
- Weight: 180 lb (82 kg; 12 st 12 lb)
- Position: Centre
- Shot: Left
- Played for: Springfield Falcons; Odense Bulldogs; San Antonio Rampage; HC Valpellice
- NHL draft: Undrafted
- Playing career: 2006–2012

Ryan Huddy (born August 28, 1983) is a Canadian former professional ice hockey center who played in the American Hockey League with the Springfield Falcons and the San Antonio Rampage. Huddy played for a single game for the Rampage in the 2010–11 season, while on loan from the Las Vegas Wranglers in the ECHL. He concluded his career after the 2011–12 season in Italy with HC Valpellice of the Serie A due to injury.
