= 2008–09 ECHL season =

Ice hockey league season

- League: ECHL
- Sport: Ice hockey
- Duration: October 17, 2008 – June 5, 2009

Regular season
- Brabham Cup: Florida Everblades
- Season MVP: Kevin Baker (Florida)
- Top scorer: Kevin Baker (Florida)

Playoffs
- Playoffs MVP: James Reimer (South Carolina)

Finals
- Champions: South Carolina Stingrays
- Runners-up: Alaska Aces

ECHL seasons
- ← 2007–08 2009–10 →

The 2008–09 ECHL season was the 21st season of the ECHL.

== League business ==
=== Team changes ===
The league welcomed one new franchise, the Ontario Reign, which relocated from Beaumont, Texas and played at the Citizens Business Bank Arena in Ontario, California.

Two teams, the Columbia Inferno and the Myrtle Beach Thunderboltz, voluntarily suspended operations for the season with plans on returning in the 2009–10 season. The Myrtle Beach franchise was originally planning to return to operations, but their arena had not been completed in time for the Board of Governors Meeting during the All-Star Break. The league announced that they were immediately terminating the Pensacola Ice Pilots franchise, because the team's owners did not intend on fielding a team for the 2008–09 season or any season after that. The team was a founding member of the ECHL as the Nashville Knights and moved to Pensacola, Florida, after the 1995–96 season.

=== Realignment ===
On June 23, the ECHL announced the new divisional alignment of its 23 franchises. The league saw three teams vacate the South Division of the American Conference shrinking the division from nine to six teams and added a franchise to the Pacific Division of the National Conference increasing the division total from four teams to five. There will be thirteen teams in the American Conference, which stretches from New York south to Florida and from Mississippi east to New Jersey, and ten teams in the National Conference which stretches from Alaska south to Arizona.

==== American Conference ====
North Division

- Cincinnati Cyclones
- Dayton Bombers
- Elmira Jackals
- Johnstown Chiefs
- Reading Royals
- Trenton Devils
- Wheeling Nailers

South Division

- Augusta Lynx
- Charlotte Checkers
- Florida Everblades
- Gwinnett Gladiators
- Mississippi Sea Wolves
- South Carolina Stingrays

==== National Conference ====
Pacific Division

- Bakersfield Condors
- Fresno Falcons
- Las Vegas Wranglers
- Ontario Reign
- Stockton Thunder

West Division

- Alaska Aces
- Idaho Steelheads
- Phoenix RoadRunners
- Utah Grizzlies
- Victoria Salmon Kings

== Regular season ==
=== Teams suspend operations in mid-season ===
On December 2, the Augusta Lynx suspended operations and voluntarily relinquished their membership to the league, in effect becoming the first team in the league's 21-year history to suspend midseason. Lynx owners stated that financial troubles and failed attempts to find additional investors were causes for the team to suspend operations. Dan Troutman, one of the team's owners, stated that he had asked the league to take over operations so the team could finish the season, but the move was voted down by the league's Board of Governors. The owners had also stated that attendance issues, in which Augusta has ranked no higher than 20th in the league the past three seasons, as the major reason for their financial problems as the team was successful in sponsorship issues.

On December 22, the Fresno Falcons became the second team in twenty days to cease operations, as the league's Board of Governors voted unanimously to terminate the franchise after Fresno's ownership notified the league that they were unable to continue the membership for financial reasons. Fresno Hockey Club, LLC., the team's ownership group, cited "overwhelming financial issues due to declining attendance and dwindling corporate sponsorships" as reasons the team did not continue to operate for the 2008–09 season. This move came less than a year after the team signed a 20-year lease with Selland Arena (starting with the 2008–09 season) and an agreement with the city of Fresno in which the city invested $5 million into upgrades for hockey at Selland Arena, as long as the team would not be sold or moved without the direct approval from the city. A clause in the agreement, stated that the city could take over the team as a government agency if owners were unable to continue operations; however, the option was declined after it was determined that the hockey club would finish the season $500,000 under expenses. City officials had expressed interest in bringing the franchise back as early as the 2009–10 season, although ECHL Commissioner was less enthusiastic stating that "a great deal of damage had been done" and that the league would give a new ownership "nine to ten months of lead time to create a solid foundation." At the time of their folding, the Falcons were in first place of the Pacific Division and had the fifth best record in the ECHL.

=== League standings ===
Note: GP = Games played; W = Wins; L= Losses; OTL = Overtime losses; SOL = Shootout losses; GF = Goals for; GA = Goals against; PTS = Points; PCT = Winning percentage; Green shade = Clinched playoff spot; Blue shade = Clinched division; Red shade = team is eliminated from playoffs; (z) = Clinched home-ice advantage

* Augusta folded on December 3, 2008. Fresno folded on December 22, 2008.

American Conference

Northern Division	GP	W	L	OTL	SOL	PTS	GF	GA
Cincinnati Cyclones (MON/NSH)	72	41	26	2	3	87	256	231
Trenton Devils (NJD)	72	40	25	2	5	87	236	206
Elmira Jackals (OTT)	72	39	26	2	5	85	235	232
Wheeling Nailers (PIT)	72	36	28	2	6	80	263	260
Johnstown Chiefs (COL/CBJ)	72	37	30	5	0	79	228	232
Dayton Bombers (Independent)	72	32	33	4	3	71	229	247
Reading Royals (TOR/LAK)	72	24	42	3	3	54	211	269

Southern Division†	GP	W	L	OTL	SOL	PTS	PCT	GF	GA
(z) Florida Everblades (CAR/FLA)	71	49	17	2	3	103	.725	265	186
South Carolina Stingrays (WSH)	71	42	23	2	4	90	.634	238	180
Charlotte Checkers (NYR)	71	34	29	2	6	76	.535	217	224
Gwinnett Gladiators (ATL/CHI)	72	31	35	1	5	68	..472	214	246
Mississippi Sea Wolves (PHI/TBL)	71	28	35	7	1	64	.451	203	256
Augusta Lynx (TBL)*	18	6	10	1	1	14	.438	39	70

† Percentage of points earned is used to determine playoff seedings in the Southern Division due to unbalanced schedules, as Gwinnett played one more game than the other teams.

National Conference

Pacific Division	GP	W	L	OTL	SOL	PTS	PCT	GF	GA
Ontario Reign (LAK)	73	38	29	4	2	82	.561	197	218
Las Vegas Wranglers (CGY)	73	34	31	2	6	76	.521	208	195
Bakersfield Condors (ANA)	72	33	32	3	4	73	.507	246	263
Stockton Thunder (EDM)	72	32	32	5	2	71	.493	210	237
Fresno Falcons (CHI)*	30	18	10	1	1	38	.633	82	82

† Percentage of points earned is used to determine playoff seedings in the Pacific Division due to unbalanced schedules, as Ontario and Las Vegas played one more game than Bakersfield and Stockton after the schedule was adjusted.

West Division	GP	W	L	OTL	SOL	PTS	GF	GA
Alaska Aces (STL)	72	45	24	1	2	93	232	181
Idaho Steelheads (DAL)	72	44	24	2	2	92	224	186
Victoria Salmon Kings (VAN)	72	38	27	2	5	83	232	200
Utah Grizzlies (NYI)	72	28	28	6	10	72	220	246
Phoenix RoadRunners (SJS)	72	30	37	2	3	65	200	246

== All Star Classic ==
The ECHL All-Star Game was played in Reading, Pennsylvania, on January 21, 2009, hosted by the Reading Royals. The American Conference defeated the National Conference 11–5, with Matthew Ford of Charlotte and Florida's Kevin Baker both scoring hat tricks to overcome a 3–1 deficit after the first period.

		American Conference		National Conference	
Position		Player	Team	Player	Team
Starters	Forward	Kevin Baker	Florida Everblades	Colin Hemingway	Alaska Aces
Starters	Forward	Barret Ehgoetz	Cincinnati Cyclones	Matt Pope	Bakersfield Condors
Starters	Forward	Travis Morin	South Carolina Stingrays	Cory Urquhart	Stockton Thunder
Starters	Defense	Ryan Gunderson	Trenton Devils	Matt Shasby	Alaska Aces
Starters	Defense	Elgin Reid	Wheeling Nailers	Dylan Yeo	Victoria Salmon Kings
Starters	Goaltender	Kris Mayotte	Johnstown Chiefs	Jean-Phillipe Lamoreux	Alaska Aces
Reserves	Forward	Josh Aspenlind	Elmira Jackals	Mark Bombersback	Idaho Steelheads
Reserves	Forward	Ryan Cruthers	Mississippi Sea Wolves	Mark Derlago	Bakersfield Condors
Reserves	Forward	Ryan Del Monte	Johnstown Chiefs	Matt Fornataro	Phoenix RoadRunners
Reserves	Forward	Tyler Doig	Reading Royals	Dan Gendur	Victoria Salmon Kings
Reserves	Forward	Bryan Ewing	Wheeling Nailers	Tim Kraus	Ontario Reign
Reserves	Forward	Matthew Ford	Charlotte Checkers	Tom May	Utah Grizzlies
Reserves	Forward	Jordan Fox	Gwinnett Gladiators	Justin Taylor	Las Vegas Wranglers
Reserves	Forward	Jarret Lukin	Dayton Bombers	Geoff Walker	Ontario Reign
Reserves	Defense	Aaron Brocklehurst	Florida Everblades	Ryan Huddy	Stockton Thunder
Reserves	Defense	Aaron Clarke	Wheeling Nailers	Kenny MacAulay	Stockton Thunder*
Reserves	Defense	Matt Cohen	Trenton Devils	Jeff May	Las Vegas Wranglers
Reserves	Defense	Johann Kroll	South Carolina Stingrays	Matt Stephenson	Idaho Steelheads
Reserves	Defense	Steve Ward	Reading Royals	Michael Wilson	Phoenix RoadRunners
Reserves	Goaltender	David Leggio	Florida Everblades	Joe Fallon	Gwinnett Gladiators*
Reserves	Goaltender	Michal Neuvirth	South Carolina Stingrays	John Murray	Ontario Reign

* Fresno's termination was announced on December 22, 2008, after ECHL All-Star voting had ended. As such, these players were voted as representatives of Fresno. Fallon's case is unique because he had moved to the American Conference. MacAulay joined head coach Matt Thomas at Stockton, in the National Conference

== Playoff format ==
On June 23, the league announced its new playoff format for the 2008–09 season. The playoffs would feature a total of sixteen teams (eight from each conference) and four rounds of play.

As it was originally announced, the top four finishers in each division were seeded based on regular season point totals. The Division Semifinals had the first seed meeting the fourth seed and the second seed meeting the third seed in a best-of-seven series. The winners of the Division Semifinals advanced to the Division Finals, a best-of-seven series. The Division Finals winners advanced to a best-of-seven Conference Finals series. The winner of the American Conference and the winner of the National Conference met in the Kelly Cup Finals, a best-of-seven game series. Home-ice advantage was determined by regular season points. This format is similar to that used by the American Hockey League for the 2009 Calder Cup playoffs.

At the Mid-Season Board of Governors Meeting in Reading, Pennsylvania, during All-Star Game, two changes were announced for the playoff format due to Augusta and Fresno folding mid-season. In the National Conference, instead of the top four teams in each division making the playoffs, the top eight teams (of the nine in the conference) made the playoffs; the fourth seed in the Pacific Division playoffs was determined by the team with the better record between fourth place in the Pacific Division and fifth place in the Western Division. All seeding in the National Conference and in the American Conference's Southern Division used percentage of points won because of an unbalanced number of games played caused by rescheduling (Points divided by Games Played, then divided by two).

== Kelly Cup playoffs ==
=== Bracket ===
Division semifinals	Division finals
N1	Cincinnati	4
N4	Wheeling	3
N1	Cincinnati	4
North Division
N3	Elmira	0
N2	Trenton	3
N3	Elmira	4
American Conference
S1	Florida	4
S4	Gwinnett	1
S1	Florida	2
South Division
S2	South Carolina	4
S2	South Carolina	4
S3	Charlotte	2
P1	Ontario	3
P4	Stockton	4
P4	Stockton	3
Pacific Division
P2	Las Vegas	4
P2	Las Vegas	4
P3	Bakersfield	3
National Conference
W1	Alaska	4
W4	Utah	1
W1	Alaska	4
West Division
W3	Victoria	1
W2	Idaho	0
W3	Victoria	4

Conference finals
N1	Cincinnati	0
S2	South Carolina	4
P2	Las Vegas	0
W1	Alaska	4

Kelly Cup finals
S2	South Carolina	4
W1	Alaska	3

== ECHL awards ==
Award	Winner
Kelly Cup:	South Carolina Stingrays
Brabham Cup:	Florida Everblades
Gingher Memorial Trophy:	South Carolina Stingrays
Bruce Taylor Trophy:	Alaska Aces
John Brophy Award:	Rick Kowalsky (Trenton)
CCM U+ Most Valuable Player:	Kevin Baker (Florida)
Kelly Cup Playoffs Most Valuable Player:	James Reimer (South Carolina)
Reebok Hockey Goaltender of the Year:	Jean-Philippe Lamoureux (Alaska)
CCM Rookie of the Year:	Bryan Ewing (Wheeling)
Defenseman of the Year:	Dylan Yeo (Victoria)
Leading Scorer:	Kevin Baker (Florida)
Reebok Plus Performer Award:	Travis Morin (South Carolina)
Sportsmanship Award:	Travis Morin (South Carolina)
Birmingham Memorial Award:	Michael Voyer

=== All-ECHL Teams ===
Bryan Ewing and Jean Philippe Lamoureux were named to both All-ECHL and ECHL All-Rookie Teams.

==== First Team ====
- Kevin Baker (F) – Florida Everblades
- Bryan Ewing (F) – Wheeling Nailers
- Travis Morin (F) – South Carolina Stingrays
- Ryan Gunderson (D) – Trenton Devils
- Dylan Yeo (D) – Victoria Salmon Kings
- Jean-Philippe Lamoureux (G) – Alaska Aces

==== Second Team ====
- Dave Bonk (F) – Bakersfield Condors
- Mark Derlago (F) – Bakersfield Condors
- Wes Goldie (F) – Victoria Salmon Kings
- Peter Metcalf (D) – Alaska Aces
- Matt Shasby (D) – Alaska Aces
- Gerald Coleman (G) – Trenton Devils

==== All-Rookie Team ====
The Wheeling Nailers set a league record with four rookies being named to the ECHL All-Rookie Team, surpassing the previous record of two which had occurred on six separate occasions.

- Bryan Ewing (F) – Wheeling Nailers
- Jordan Morrison (F) – Wheeling Nailers
- Matt Pope (F) – Bakersfield Condors
- Mitch Ganzak (D) – Wheeling Nailers
- Elgin Reid (D) – Wheeling Nailers
- Jean-Philippe Lamoureux (G) – Alaska Aces

== See also ==
- List of ECHL seasons
- 2008 in sports
- 2009 in sports
