= Jared Bednar =

Canadian ice hockey player and coach

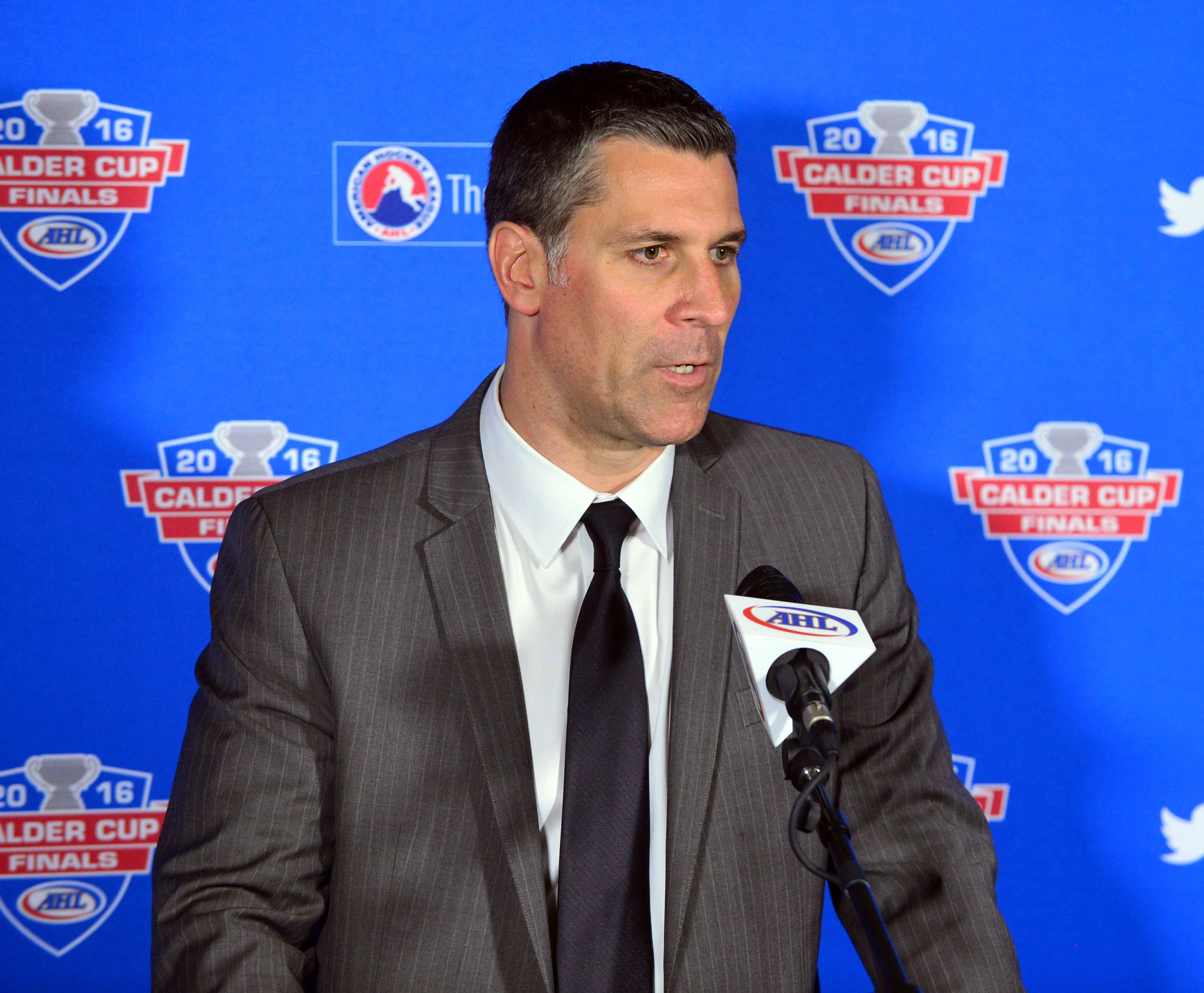
- Bednar at a media interview during the 2016 Calder Cup Finals
- Born: February 28, 1972 (age 54) Yorkton, Saskatchewan, Canada
- Height: 6 ft 3 in (191 cm)
- Weight: 205 lb (93 kg; 14 st 9 lb)
- Position: Defence
- Shot: Right
- Played for: St. John's Maple Leafs; Rochester Americans; Grand Rapids Griffins
- Current NHL coach: Colorado Avalanche
- Playing career: 1993–2002
- Coaching career: 2002–present

Jared Garry Bednar (born February 28, 1972) is a Canadian professional ice hockey coach and former player who is the head coach for the Colorado Avalanche of the National Hockey League (NHL). He previously coached the Lake Erie Monsters of the American Hockey League, leading them to a Calder Cup championship in 2015–16. He also led the South Carolina Stingrays of the ECHL to a Kelly Cup championship in the 2008–09 season. Bednar won the Stanley Cup with Colorado in 2022, becoming the first coach to win the current ECHL, AHL, and NHL trophies (Kelly, Calder, and Stanley Cup, respectively).

== Playing career ==
Bednar played junior hockey with the Western Hockey League's Saskatoon Blades, Spokane Chiefs, Medicine Hat Tigers, and Prince Albert Raiders, from 1990 to 1993, playing in 152 games with 520 combined penalty minutes, establishing himself as a physical player. After going undrafted by the NHL, Bednar made his professional debut during the 1993–94 season, with the Huntington Blizzard of the East Coast Hockey League (ECHL). He played three seasons with the team, posting a career high in points during the 1994–95 season, with 45 points in 64 games.

Bednar joined the ECHL's South Carolina Stingrays halfway through the 1995–96 season, posting 24 points and 126 penalty minutes in his first 39 games. From 1995 to 1998, he played mostly with the Stingrays, with small stints in the American Hockey League (AHL) with the St. John's Maple Leafs and Rochester Americans. He played the 1998–99 season with the Grand Rapids Griffins of the International Hockey League (IHL), racking up 21 points and 220 PIMS in 71 games with the Griffins. Bednar re-joined the Stingrays for the 1999–2000 season and played two more seasons with the Rays. He announced his retirement after the 2001–02 season.

== Coaching career ==
After retiring as a player, Bednar remained with the Stingrays as an assistant coach from 2002 to 2007. After head coach Jason Fitzsimmons stepped down, Bednar was named his successor for the 2007–08 season. His first season as coach was extremely successful, with the Stingrays winning 47 games in the regular season, and making it to the American Conference finals in the playoffs. After another successful season in 2008–09, the Stingrays won the Kelly Cup, giving Bednar his first championship as a coach in only his second season.

After winning the Cup, Bednar stepped down as head coach of the Stingrays to become assistant coach of the Abbotsford Heat of the AHL for the 2009–10 season. He was then the head coach of the AHL's Peoria Rivermen from 2010 through 2012.

The Columbus Blue Jackets hired Bednar as an assistant coach for their minor league AHL affiliate, the Springfield Falcons, beginning with the 2012–13 season. After serving in this role for two seasons, he was promoted to head coach following the promotion of Brad Larsen to Columbus' staff. For the 2015–16 season, Columbus shifted their AHL affiliation to the Lake Erie Monsters in Cleveland. Bednar followed the affiliation to Cleveland and continued as head coach. Lake Erie went 15–2 in the 2016 Calder Cup playoffs to capture the franchise's first championship and the first for the city of Cleveland since the original Cleveland Barons won the 1964 Calder Cup. He was later rewarded by the Blue Jackets with a two-year contract extension through to the 2018–19 season on July 19, 2016.

On August 25, 2016, Bednar was named head coach of the Colorado Avalanche of the National Hockey League (NHL), replacing Patrick Roy. This was an unusually late hire for an NHL head coach. However, Roy had resigned less than a month before training camp, leaving Bednar with little time to get to know his new players. He also had no time to implement his own system or hire his own staff; he was forced to retain Roy's assistants. Despite having talented players, such as Nathan MacKinnon, Gabriel Landeskog and Matt Duchene on the roster, the team never recovered from a 4–21–1 December and January and slumped to only 48 points, the worst record in the league and the worst since the Quebec Nordiques moved to Denver in 1995. It was also one of the worst records for a non-expansion team since 1967, and the worst since the team moved from Quebec City in 1995.

Bednar did not take long to bring the Avalanche back to respectability. In his second season in Denver, Bednar guided the team to a 47-point improvement. The team faced some adversity early in the season with the distraction of Duchene's public trade request. Following the trade, Bednar guided the team to one of the hottest second half records, returning them to the playoffs for the first time in four years. After the Avalanche's first round exit in six games to the Nashville Predators, Bednar was signed to a one-year contract extension on April 23, 2018. A few days after signing a new contract, Bednar was nominated for the Jack Adams Award.

In Bednar's third season coaching the Avalanche, he led the team to back-to-back playoff appearances for the first time since Joel Quenneville in 2003–04 and 2005–06. The Avalanche defeated the Calgary Flames 4–1 in the Western Conference's first round, and then were defeated in the second round in seven games by the San Jose Sharks. On July 9, 2019, Bednar signed a two-year contract extension. He coached the team to the Presidents' Trophy in the COVID-19-shortened 2020–21 season with a record of 39–13–4 through 56 games; it was the franchise's first trophy since the Cup-winning season of 2000–01. In 2021–22, after earning a franchise-record 119 points, Bednar led the Avalanche to the third Stanley Cup in franchise history when his team defeated the Tampa Bay Lightning, who were defending back-to-back Stanley Cup champions and had won 11 straight postseason series. Notably, they only lost four of their 20 playoff games (16–4).

Mainly on the strength of the 2021–22 season, Bednar began the 2022–23 season with the most wins in the Colorado portion of Nordiques/Avalanche history. He won his 265th game with the Avalanche on January 21, 2023, with a 2–1 shootout win over the Seattle Kraken. This tied Michel Bergeron for the most wins in Nordiques/Avalanche history. He passed Bergeron in the next game, on January 24, with a 3–2 win over the Washington Capitals. After the season, Bednar and the Avalanche agreed to a three-year contract extension that took effect at the end of the 2023–24 season. He coached the team to its best record in franchise history, 55–16–11, in the 2025–26 season, earning the team another Presidents' Trophy.

On September 30, 2026, Bednar was signed to a four-year contract extension by the Avalanche.

== Career statistics ==
			Regular season					Playoffs
Season	Team	League	GP	G	A	Pts	PIM	GP	G	A	Pts	PIM
1990–91	Saskatoon Blades	WHL	28	1	5	6	30	—	—	—	—	—
1991–92	Spokane Chiefs	WHL	62	7	17	24	200	7	2	1	3	9
1992–93	Spokane Chiefs	WHL	16	2	14	16	62	—	—	—	—	—
1992–93	Medicine Hat Tigers	WHL	9	1	4	5	20	—	—	—	—	—
1992–93	Prince Albert Raiders	WHL	37	6	16	22	56	—	—	—	—	—
1993–94	Huntington Blizzard	ECHL	66	8	11	19	115	—	—	—	—	—
1994–95	Huntington Blizzard	ECHL	64	9	36	45	211	2	0	2	2	4
1995–96	Huntington Blizzard	ECHL	25	4	10	14	90	—	—	—	—	—
1995–96	South Carolina Stingrays	ECHL	39	2	22	24	126	8	0	0	0	26
1996–97	St. John's Maple Leafs	AHL	55	1	2	3	151	—	—	—	—	—
1996–97	South Carolina Stingrays	ECHL	15	1	2	3	28	15	1	4	5	59
1997–98	Rochester Americans	AHL	19	0	2	2	49	—	—	—	—	—
1997–98	South Carolina Stingrays	ECHL	36	4	4	8	126	5	1	2	3	17
1998–99	Grand Rapids Griffins	IHL	74	3	18	21	220	—	—	—	—	—
1999–00	South Carolina Stingrays	ECHL	61	4	13	17	214	10	0	2	2	25
1999–00	Rochester Americans	AHL	—	—	—	—	—	1	0	0	0	0
2000–01	South Carolina Stingrays	ECHL	57	6	9	15	155	15	0	5	5	24
2001–02	South Carolina Stingrays	ECHL	71	5	23	28	145	1	0	0	0	2
ECHL totals			434	61	130	191	1,210	46	2	15	15	157
IHL totals			74	3	18	21	220	—	—	—	—	—
AHL totals			74	1	4	5	200	1	0	0	0	0

== Head coaching record ==
Team	Year	Regular season						Postseason			
Team	Year	G	W	L	OTL	Pts	Finish	W	L	Win%	Result
COL	2016–17	82	22	56	4	48	7th in Central	—	—	—	Missed playoffs
COL	2017–18	82	43	30	9	95	4th in Central	2	4	.333	Lost in first round (NSH)
COL	2018–19	82	38	30	14	90	5th in Central	7	5	.583	Lost in second round (SJS)
COL	2019–20	70*	42	20	8	92	2nd in Central	9	6	.600	Lost in second round (DAL)
COL	2020–21	56	39	13	4	82	1st in West	6	4	.600	Lost in second round (VGK)
COL	2021–22	82	56	19	7	119	1st in Central	16	4	.800	Won Stanley Cup (TBL)
COL	2022–23	82	51	24	7	109	1st in Central	3	4	.429	Lost in first round (SEA)
COL	2023–24	82	50	25	7	107	3rd in Central	6	5	.545	Lost in second round (DAL)
COL	2024–25	82	49	29	4	102	3rd in Central	3	4	.429	Lost in first round (DAL)
COL	2025–26	82	55	16	11	121	1st in Central	8	5	.615	Lost in conference finals (VGK)
Total		782	445	262	75			60	41	.594	9 playoff appearances 1 Stanley Cup title

- Season shortened due to the COVID-19 pandemic during the 2019–20 season. Playoffs were played in August 2020 with a different format.

Preceded by Jason Fitzsimmons	South Carolina Stingrays head coach 2007–2009	Succeeded by Cail MacLean
Preceded by Brad Larsen	Springfield Falcons head coach 2014–15	Succeeded by Ron Rolston
Preceded by Dean Chynoweth	Lake Erie Monsters head coach 2015–16	Succeeded by John Madden
Preceded by Patrick Roy	Head coach of the Colorado Avalanche; 2016–present	Incumbent
