= Nick Vitucci Goaltender of the Year Award =

The Nick Vitucci Goaltender of the Year Award is an ice hockey award presented annually by the ECHL to the goaltender adjudged to be the best at his position. This award was first presented in 1994 to Cory Cadden of the Knoxville Cherokees as the ECHL Goaltender of the Year. It was renamed in honor of 2008 ECHL Hall of Fame inductee Nick Vitucci in 2022.

== List of winners ==
Season	Winner	Team
1993–94	Cory Cadden	Knoxville Cherokees
1994–95	Chris Gordon	Huntington Blizzard
1995–96	Alain Morissette	Louisville RiverFrogs
1996–97	Marc Delorme	Louisiana IceGators
1997–98	Nick Vitucci	Toledo Storm
1998–99	Maxime Gingras	Richmond Renegades
1999–00	Jan Lasak	Hampton Roads Admirals
2000–01	Scott Stirling	Trenton Titans
2001–02	Frederic Cloutier	Louisiana IceGators
2002–03	Alfie Michaud	Peoria Rivermen
2003–04	Scott Stirling	Atlantic City Boardwalk Bullies
2004–05	Chris Madden	Long Beach Ice Dogs/Florida Everblades
2005–06	Matt Underhill	Alaska Aces
2006–07	Adam Berkhoel	Dayton Bombers
2007–08	Anton Khudobin	Texas Wildcatters
2008–09	Jean-Philippe Lamoureux	Alaska Aces
2009–10	Todd Ford	South Carolina Stingrays
2010–11	Gerald Coleman	Alaska Aces
2012–12	Jeff Jakaitis	Gwinnett Gladiators
2012–13	Ryan Zapolski	South Carolina Stingrays
2013–14	Jeff Jakaitis	South Carolina Stingrays
2014–15	Jeff Jakaitis	South Carolina Stingrays
2015–16	Josh Robinson	Missouri Mavericks
2016–17	Riley Gill	Allen Americans
2017–18	Parker Milner	South Carolina Stingrays
2018–19	Michael Houser	Cincinnati Cyclones
2019–20	Tomas Sholl	Idaho Steelheads
2020–21	Jake Hildebrand	Florida Everblades
2021–22	Francois Brassard	Jacksonville Icemen
2022–23	John Lethemon	Toledo Walleye
2023–24	Taylor Gauthier	Wheeling Nailers
2023–24	Cam Johnson	Florida Everblades

== See also ==
- ECHL awards
