= Troy Mann =

Canadian ice hockey player

- Born: September 3, 1969 (age 56) Campbellton, New Brunswick, Canada
- Height: 5 ft 10 in (178 cm)
- Weight: 185 lb (84 kg; 13 st 3 lb)
- Position: Centre
- Shot: Left
- Played for: CoHL; Saginaw Wheels; ECHL; Mississippi Sea Wolves; Hampton Roads Admirals; Tallahassee Tiger Sharks; Jackson Bandits; UHL; Saginaw/Ohio Gears; Elmira Jackals; Flint Generals; Missouri River Otters; Kalamazoo Wings; WCHL; Bakersfield Condors; CHL; San Angelo Saints; Topeka Tarantulas
- NHL draft: Undrafted
- Playing career: 1995–2005

Troy Mann (born September 3, 1969) is a Canadian former professional ice hockey player who is currently the head coach of the Kingston Frontenacs of the OHL.

Born in Campbellton, New Brunswick, Mann began his professional playing career in 1995 with the Saginaw Wheels of the Colonial Hockey League, and played 10 seasons in the professional minor leagues before retiring as a player following the 2004-05 season when he served as a playing assistant coach with the CHL's Topeka Tarantulas. He focused on a coaching career with the 2005–06 ECHL season when he was hired as an assistant coach with the Columbia Inferno, becoming their head coach the following season.

Mann served as an assistant coach with the Hershey Bears of the AHL for four years. After he was passed over in the Bears' vacant head coaching search, he moved to the Bakersfield Condors of the ECHL. On July 2, 2014, after a successful season with the Condors, Mann returned to the Bears as head coach. He was released after four seasons with the Bears, earning an overall 162–102–22–18 record, but failing to make the playoffs in his fourth season. He was hired on June 25, 2018, as the head coach of the Belleville Senators in the AHL.

== Coaching career ==
=== American Hockey League ===
Team	Year	Regular season						Post season
Team	Year	G	W	L	OTL	Pts	Division rank	Result
Hershey Bears	2014-15	76	46	22	8	100	1st in East	Won in conference quarter-finals (3-1 vs. WOR); Lost in conference semi-finals (2-4 vs. HFD)
Hershey Bears	2015-16	76	43	21	12	98	1st in Atlantic	Won in division semi-finals (3-2 vs. POR); Won in division finals (4-3 vs. WBS); Won in conference finals (4-1 vs. TOR); Lost Calder Cup final (0-4 vs. LE)
Hershey Bears	2016-17	76	43	22	11	97	3rd in Atlantic	Won in division semi-finals (3-2 vs. LV); Lost in division finals (3-4 vs. PRO)
Hershey Bears	2017-18	76	30	37	9	69	8th in Atlantic	Did not qualify
Belleville Senators	2018-19	76	37	31	8	82	5th in North	Did not qualify
Belleville Senators	2019-20	63	38	20	5	81	1st in North	Playoffs cancelled due to COVID-19
Belleville Senators	2020-21	35	18	16	1	37	3rd in Canadian	Did not qualify
Belleville Senators	2021-22	72	40	28	4	84	4th in North	Lost in division quarter-finals (0-2 vs. ROC)
Belleville Senators	2022-23	43	17	22	4	38	6th in North	Fired
Hershey totals (2014-2018)		304	162	102	40	364	2 division titles	22-21 (0.512)
Belleville totals (2018-2023)		289	150	117	22	322	1 division title	0-2 (0.000)
AHL totals (2014-2023)		593	312	219	62	686	3 division titles	22-23 (0.489)

=== ECHL ===
Team	Year	Regular season						Post season
Team	Year	G	W	L	OTL	Pts	Division rank	Result
Columbia Inferno	2006-07	72	29	34	9	67	7th in Southern	Did not qualify
Columbia Inferno	2007-08	72	33	28	11	77	5th in Southern	Won in division quarter-finals (3-0 vs. FLA); Won in division semi-finals (3-2 vs. TEX); Lost in division finals (2-3 vs. SC)
Bakersfield Condors	2013-14	72	36	30	6	78	2nd in Pacific	Won in conference quarter-finals (4-1 vs. UTA); Won in conference semi-finals (4-1 vs. STO); Lost in conference finals (2-4 vs. ALA)
Columbia totals (2006-2008)		144	62	62	20	144		8-5 (0.615)
Bakersfield totals (2013-2014)		72	36	30	6	78		10-6 (0.625)
ECHL totals (2006-2014)		216	98	92	26	222		18-11 (0.621)

=== OHL ===
Team	Year	Regular season						Post season
Team	Year	G	W	L	OTL	Pts	Division rank	Result
Kingston Frontenacs	2023-24	57	29	24	4	62	4th in East	Lost in conference quarter-finals (1-4 vs. NB)
Kingston Frontenacs	2024-25	68	40	20	8	88	2nd in East	Won in conference quarter-finals (4-0 vs. SBY); Lost in conference semi-finals (3-4 vs. BAR)
Kingston Frontenacs	2025-26	68	33	30	5	71	4th in East	Lost in conference quarter-finals (0-4 vs. OTT)
OHL totals (2023-2026)		193	102	74	17	221		8-12 (0.400)

Sporting positions
Preceded by Mike Haviland	Head coach of the Hershey Bears; 2014–2018	Succeeded by Spencer Carbery
Preceded by Kurt Kleinendorst	Head coach of the Belleville Senators; 2018–2023	Succeeded by David Bell
