= Sean Gauthier =

Canadian ice hockey player

- Born: March 28, 1971 (age 55) Sudbury, Ontario, Canada
- Height: 5 ft 11 in (180 cm)
- Weight: 202 lb (92 kg; 14 st 6 lb)
- Position: Goaltender
- Caught: Left
- Played for: San Jose Sharks
- National team: Canada
- NHL draft: 181st overall, 1991; Winnipeg Jets
- Playing career: 1991–2005

Sean D. Gauthier (born March 28, 1971) is a Canadian former ice hockey goaltender.

== Career ==
Gauthier was drafted by the Winnipeg Jets in 1991. He appeared in one game in the National Hockey League for the San Jose Sharks in the 1998–99 season, against the Chicago Blackhawks. The rest of his career, which lasted from 1991 to 2005, was spent in various minor leagues.

== Personal life ==
Gauthier lives in Scottsdale, Arizona with his wife and three children. One of his sons, Cutter Gauthier, (born in Skellefteå, Sweden) was selected 5th overall by the Philadelphia Flyers in the 2022 NHL entry draft, and his NHL rights were traded to the Anaheim Ducks immediately following the 2024 World Junior Ice Hockey Championships, where Cutter excelled for the gold medal-winning Team USA.

== Career statistics ==
| | | | Regular season | | | | | | | | | Playoffs |
| Season | Team | League | GP | W | L | T | MIN | GA | SO | GAA | SV% | GP | W | L | MIN | GA | SO | GAA | SV% |
|---|---|---|---|---|---|---|---|---|---|---|---|---|---|---|---|---|---|---|---|
| 1987–88 | Oakville Blades | COJHL | 28 | — | — | — | 1491 | 110 | 2 | 4.43 | — | — | — | — | — | — | — | — | — |
| 1988–89 | Kingston Raiders | OHL | 37 | 7 | 18 | 1 | 1528 | 141 | 0 | 5.54 | — | — | — | — | — | — | — | — | — |
| 1989–90 | Kingston Frontenacs | OHL | 32 | 17 | 9 | 0 | 1602 | 101 | 0 | 3.78 | .880 | 2 | 0 | 1 | 76 | 6 | 0 | 4.74 | — |
| 1990–91 | Kingston Frontenacs | OHL | 59 | 16 | 36 | 3 | 3200 | 282 | 0 | 5.29 | .861 | — | — | — | — | — | — | — | — |
| 1991–92 | Moncton Hawks | AHL | 25 | 8 | 10 | 5 | 1415 | 88 | 1 | 3.73 | ю881 | 2 | 0 | 0 | 26 | 2 | 0 | 4.62 | .882 |
| 1991–92 | Fort Wayne Komets | IHL | 18 | 10 | 4 | 2 | 978 | 59 | 1 | 3.62 | — | 2 | 0 | 0 | 48 | 7 | 0 | 8.74 | — |
| 1992–93 | Moncton Hawks | AHL | 38 | 10 | 16 | 9 | 2196 | 145 | 0 | 3.96 | .889 | 2 | 0 | 1 | 75 | 6 | 0 | 4.80 | — |
| 1993–94 | Moncton Hawks | AHL | 13 | 3 | 5 | 1 | 616 | 41 | 0 | 3.99 | .865 | — | — | — | — | — | — | — | — |
| 1993–94 | Fort Wayne Komets | IHL | 22 | 9 | 9 | 3 | 1139 | 66 | 0 | 3.48 | .887 | — | — | — | — | — | — | — | — |
| 1994–95 | Fort Wayne Komets | IHL | 5 | 0 | 2 | 1 | 217 | 15 | 0 | 4.13 | .872 | — | — | — | — | — | — | — | — |
| 1994–95 | Canadian National Team | Intl | 24 | — | — | — | 1326 | 53 | 0 | 2.40 | — | — | — | — | — | — | — | — | — |
| 1995–96 | South Carolina Stingrays | ECHL | 49 | 31 | 11 | 7 | 2891 | 149 | 0 | 3.09 | .906 | 8 | 5 | 3 | 478 | 24 | 0 | 3.01 | — |
| 1995–96 | St. John's Maple Leafs | AHL | 5 | 1 | 1 | 0 | 173 | 9 | 0 | 3.12 | .914 | — | — | — | — | — | — | — | — |
| 1996–97 | Pensacola Ice Pilots | ECHL | 46 | 23 | 21 | 1 | 2692 | 168 | 1 | 3.74 | .904 | 12 | 8 | 4 | 749 | 44 | 1 | 3.52 | — |
| 1997–98 | Pensacola Ice Pilots | ECHL | 54 | 29 | 17 | 7 | 3213 | 194 | 0 | 3.62 | .902 | 19 | 12 | 7 | 1180 | 58 | 1 | 2.95 | — |
| 1998–99 | San Jose Sharks | NHL | 1 | 0 | 0 | 0 | 4 | 0 | 0 | 0.00 | 1.000 | — | — | — | — | — | — | — | — |
| 1998–99 | Kentucky Thoroughblades | AHL | 40 | 18 | 15 | 6 | 2376 | 99 | 1 | 2.50 | .916 | 4 | 0 | 1 | 130 | 8 | 0 | 3.68 | .879 |
| 1999–00 | Louisiana IceGators | ECHL | 22 | 12 | 6 | 3 | 1230 | 62 | 0 | 3.02 | .907 | — | — | — | — | — | — | — | — |
| 1999–00 | Louisville Panthers | AHL | 39 | 24 | 12 | 2 | 2259 | 102 | 3 | 2.71 | .920 | 4 | 1 | 3 | 239 | 14 | 0 | 3.52 | .891 |
| 2000–01 | Louisville Panthers | AHL | 54 | 11 | 33 | 4 | 2725 | 165 | 2 | 3.63 | .896 | — | — | — | — | — | — | — | — |
| 2001–02 | Reading Royals | ECHL | 23 | 12 | 8 | 2 | 1380 | 52 | 0 | 2.26 | .913 | — | — | — | — | — | — | — | — |
| 2001–02 | Leksands IF | Allsv | 18 | — | — | — | — | — | 1 | 2.09 | .902 | — | — | — | — | — | — | — | — |
| 2002–03 | Leksands IF | SEL | 39 | — | — | — | 2313 | 100 | 3 | 2.59 | .907 | 5 | — | — | 298 | 14 | 1 | 2.81 | .907 |
| 2003–04 | Skellefteå AIK | Allsv | 14 | — | — | — | — | — | 0 | 2.47 | .903 | — | — | — | — | — | — | — | — |
| 2004–05 | Skellefteå AIK | Allsv | 15 | — | — | — | — | — | 4 | 2.54 | .878 | — | — | — | — | — | — | — | — |
| NHL totals | | | 1 | 0 | 0 | 0 | 4 | 0 | 0 | 0.00 | 1.000 | — | — | — | — | — | — | — | — |

== See also ==
- List of players who played only one game in the NHL
