= Jerry Zucker (disambiguation) =

Jerry Zucker (born 1950) is an American film director/producer.

Jerry Zucker also may refer to:

- Jerry Zucker (businessman) (1949–2008), Israeli-born American businessman

== See also ==
- Jeremy Zucker
- Gerhard Zucker, businessman and rocket scientist
