= Cail MacLean =

Canadian ice hockey player and coach

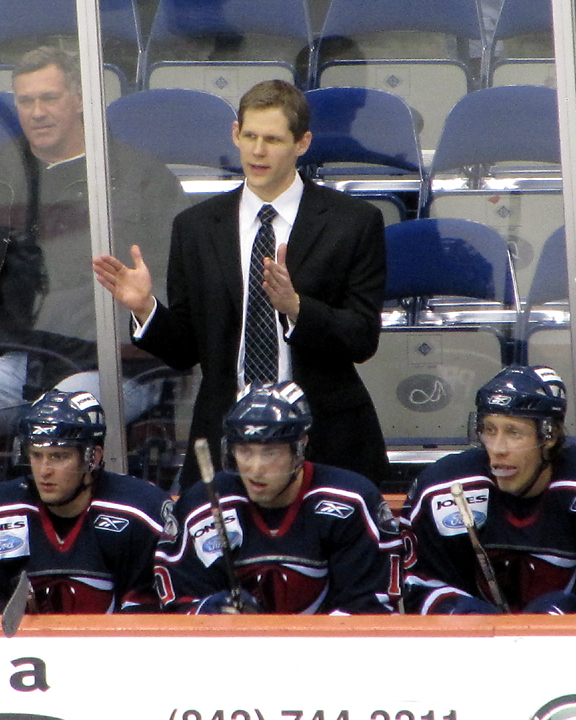
- MacLean in 2010
- Born: September 30, 1976 (age 49) Middleton, Nova Scotia, Canada
- Height: 5 ft 11 in (180 cm)
- Weight: 197 lb (89 kg; 14 st 1 lb)
- Position: Right wing
- Shot: Right
- Played for: Cleveland Lumberjacks; Cincinnati Mighty Ducks; Indianapolis Ice; Michigan K-Wings; Lowell Lock Monsters; Philadelphia Phantoms; Grand Rapids Griffins; Providence Bruins; Hartford Wolf Pack; Hershey Bears; Bridgeport Sound Tigers
- NHL draft: Undrafted
- Playing career: 1997–2008

Cail MacLean (born September 30, 1976) is a Canadian former professional ice hockey player and is an assistant coach for the Calgary Flames of the National Hockey League.

== Playing career ==
MacLean was born in Middleton, Nova Scotia. He played his junior career with the Kingston Frontenacs of the Ontario Hockey League (OHL). After being skipped over in the NHL entry draft, MacLean signed his first professional contract with the ECHL's Jacksonville Lizard Kings in 1997. He played two partial seasons with Jacksonville while also playing games in the American Hockey League (AHL) and the International Hockey League (IHL).

After signing with the Trenton Titans in 1999, MacLean spent most of the remainder of his career with the ECHL, seeing two full seasons of AHL action with the Hershey Bears (2002–03) and the Bridgeport Sound Tigers (2003–04). He served as the Titans' team captain and led them to the 2001 Kelly Cup finals, where they lost to the South Carolina Stingrays 4 games to 1.

He signed with the Reading Royals in 2004, and spent one season on the team. In 2005 he signed with the South Carolina Stingrays and was named team captain a year later. MacLean spent the remainder of his professional career with the Stingrays, leading them to the 2007–08 American Conference finals where they were bested by the Cincinnati Cyclones 4 games to 1.

== Coaching career ==
=== South Carolina Stingrays ===
In 2008, MacLean announced his retirement from professional hockey and was named the assistant coach of the Stingrays soon after. He helped lead the Stingrays to the Kelly Cup championship in 2009.

After head coach Jared Bednar stepped down in 2009, MacLean was named the head coach of the team. He spent two seasons (2009–10 and 2010–11) with the Stingrays as head coach before accepting an assistant coaching position with the AHL's Abbotsford Heat in July 2011. MacLean led the Stingrays to two Kelly Cup playoff appearances and a 78-48-18 record during his tenure as head coach. While with the Stingrays, MacLean was selected as the American Conference coach for the 2010 ECHL All-Star Game and was recognized as the runner-up for the ECHL's 2009–10 John Brophy Award.

=== Abbotsford Heat ===
MacLean replaced Troy Ward as Abbotsford's assistant coach when Ward was named the Heat's head coach in June 2011. MacLean previously played for Ward when Ward was the head coach for the ECHL's Trenton Titans.

=== Adirondack Thunder ===
In 2015, he returned to the Calgary Flames' organization and was named head coach of the Adirondack Thunder of the ECHL. In 2017, the Flames ended their affiliation with the Thunder and MacLean moved up to an assistant coach position with the Flames' AHL affiliate, the Stockton Heat.

=== Stockton Heat ===
After serving one season as an assistant in Stockton, the Heat's head coach Ryan Huska moved up to the Flames as an assistant in 2018. MacLean was then promoted to the head coaching position for the 2018–19 AHL season. In 2021, the Calgary Flames promoted MacLean to assistant coach with the Flames after serving as the Heat's head coach for three seasons and a 72–65–16 record.

== Awards ==
=== Coaching ===
- American Conference coach, 2010 ECHL All-Star Game (2009–10)
- Runner-up, John Brophy Award (2009–10)

== Career statistics ==
| | | | Regular season | | | | | Playoffs |
| Season | Team | League | GP | G | A | Pts | PIM | GP | G | A | Pts | PIM |
|---|---|---|---|---|---|---|---|---|---|---|---|---|
| 1993–94 | Kingston Frontenacs | OHL | 53 | 7 | 7 | 14 | 15 | 1 | 0 | 0 | 0 | 0 |
| 1994–95 | Kingston Frontenacs | OHL | 65 | 11 | 17 | 28 | 17 | 6 | 0 | 0 | 0 | 0 |
| 1995–96 | Kingston Frontenacs | OHL | 66 | 15 | 37 | 52 | 53 | 6 | 2 | 2 | 4 | 2 |
| 1996–97 | Kingston Frontenacs | OHL | 60 | 34 | 42 | 76 | 47 | 5 | 1 | 1 | 2 | 2 |
| 1997–98 | Jacksonville Lizard Kings | ECHL | 5 | 1 | 0 | 1 | 4 | 1 | 0 | 0 | 0 | 0 |
| 1997–98 | Cleveland Lumberjacks | IHL | 1 | 0 | 0 | 0 | 0 | — | — | — | — | — |
| 1997–98 | Cincinnati Mighty Ducks | AHL | 7 | 0 | 1 | 1 | 4 | — | — | — | — | — |
| 1998–99 | Jacksonville Lizard Kings | ECHL | 40 | 29 | 28 | 57 | 14 | — | — | — | — | — |
| 1998–99 | Indianapolis Ice | IHL | 35 | 13 | 7 | 20 | 20 | 7 | 2 | 2 | 4 | 0 |
| 1999–00 | Trenton Titans | ECHL | 50 | 34 | 25 | 59 | 24 | 14 | 10 | 5 | 15 | 6 |
| 1999–00 | Michigan K-Wings | IHL | 14 | 0 | 3 | 3 | 6 | — | — | — | — | — |
| 1999–00 | Lowell Lock Monsters | AHL | 5 | 0 | 1 | 1 | 0 | — | — | — | — | — |
| 1999–00 | Philadelphia Phantoms | AHL | 3 | 0 | 0 | 0 | 0 | — | — | — | — | — |
| 2000–01 | Trenton Titans | ECHL | 49 | 28 | 17 | 45 | 26 | 19 | 13 | 4 | 17 | 10 |
| 2000–01 | Grand Rapids Griffins | IHL | 16 | 2 | 0 | 2 | 0 | — | — | — | — | — |
| 2000–01 | Philadelphia Phantoms | AHL | 9 | 0 | 1 | 1 | 4 | — | — | — | — | — |
| 2001–02 | Providence Bruins | AHL | 9 | 1 | 0 | 1 | 0 | — | — | — | — | — |
| 2001–02 | Hartford Wolf Pack | AHL | 1 | 0 | 0 | 0 | 0 | — | — | — | — | — |
| 2001–02 | Trenton Titans | ECHL | 41 | 17 | 17 | 34 | 18 | — | — | — | — | — |
| 2001–02 | Lowell Lock Monsters | AHL | 3 | 0 | 1 | 1 | 0 | — | — | — | — | — |
| 2001–02 | Hershey Bears | AHL | 21 | 4 | 6 | 10 | 4 | 6 | 0 | 0 | 0 | 0 |
| 2002–03 | Hershey Bears | AHL | 74 | 16 | 13 | 29 | 14 | 5 | 0 | 0 | 0 | 0 |
| 2003–04 | Bridgeport Sound Tigers | AHL | 61 | 6 | 10 | 16 | 16 | 7 | 1 | 0 | 1 | 0 |
| 2004–05 | Reading Royals | ECHL | 59 | 23 | 19 | 42 | 42 | 8 | 2 | 1 | 3 | 2 |
| 2004–05 | Hershey Bears | AHL | 14 | 0 | 0 | 0 | 4 | — | — | — | — | — |
| 2005–06 | South Carolina Stingrays | ECHL | 46 | 17 | 16 | 33 | 42 | 6 | 2 | 2 | 4 | 4 |
| 2006–07 | South Carolina Stingrays | ECHL | 60 | 25 | 33 | 58 | 58 | — | — | — | — | — |
| 2007–08 | South Carolina Stingrays | ECHL | 63 | 21 | 25 | 46 | 30 | 20 | 2 | 9 | 11 | 14 |
| AHL totals | | | 207 | 27 | 33 | 60 | 46 | 18 | 1 | 0 | 1 | 0 |

| Preceded by Jared Bednar | South Carolina Stingrays head coach 2009–2011 | Succeeded by Spencer Carbery |
