= Marc Delorme =

Canadian ice hockey player

- Born: June 19, 1970 (age 55) Montreal, Quebec, Canada
- Height: 6 ft 0 in (183 cm)
- Weight: 174 lb (79 kg; 12 st 6 lb)
- Position: Goaltender
- Caught: Right
- Played for: CoHL; Brantford Smoke; ECHL; Louisiana IceGators; Birmingham Bulls; IHL; Detroit Vipers; WCHL; Reno Rage; Anchorage Aces; UHL; Saginaw Gears; Winston-Salem IceHawks; QSPHL; St. Jean Mission; Granby Predateurs; LNAH; Sorel-Tracy Mission
- NHL draft: Undrafted
- Playing career: 1994–2006

Marc Delorme (born June 19, 1970) is a Canadian former professional ice hockey goaltender.

Prior to turning professional, Delorme played major junior hockey in the Quebec Major Junior Hockey League.

== Awards and honours ==
| Award | Year |
|---|---|
| ECHL Goaltender of the Year | 1996–97 |
| ECHL First All-Star Team | 1996–97 |
