= Cory Cadden =

Canadian ice hockey player

- Born: February 21, 1969; Edmonton, Alberta, Canada
- Died: September 8, 2017 (aged 48); Summerville, South Carolina, U.S.
- Height: 6 ft 2 in (188 cm)
- Weight: 194 lb (88 kg; 13 st 12 lb)
- Position: Goaltender
- Caught: Left
- Played for: AHL; Saint John Flames; ECHL; Knoxville Cherokees; Dayton Bombers; Peoria Rivermen; South Carolina Stingrays; Pee Dee Pride; IHL; Detroit Vipers; WPHL; Lubbock Cotton Kings
- NHL draft: Undrafted
- Playing career: 1992–2001

Cory Cadden (February 21, 1969 – September 8, 2017) was a Canadian professional ice hockey goaltender.

Prior to turning professional, Cadden played NCAA Division I hockey with the University of North Dakota men's ice hockey team.

Cadden died on September 8, 2017.

== Awards and honours ==
Award	Year
ECHL Goaltender of the Year	1993–94
ECHL First All-Star Team	1993–94
