= Spencer Carbery =

Canadian ice hockey player and coach

- Carbery in 2026
- Born: November 9, 1981 (age 44) Victoria, British Columbia, Canada
- Height: 6 ft 2 in (188 cm)
- Weight: 190 lb (86 kg; 13 st 8 lb)
- Position: Left wing
- Shot: Left
- Played for: Tulsa Oilers; Bakersfield Condors; Stockton Thunder; Fresno Falcons; South Carolina Stingrays
- Current NHL coach: Washington Capitals
- NHL draft: Undrafted
- Playing career: 2006–2010
- Coaching career: 2010–present

Spencer Carbery (born November 9, 1981) is a Canadian professional ice hockey coach and former player who is the head coach for the Washington Capitals of the National Hockey League (NHL).

== Playing career ==
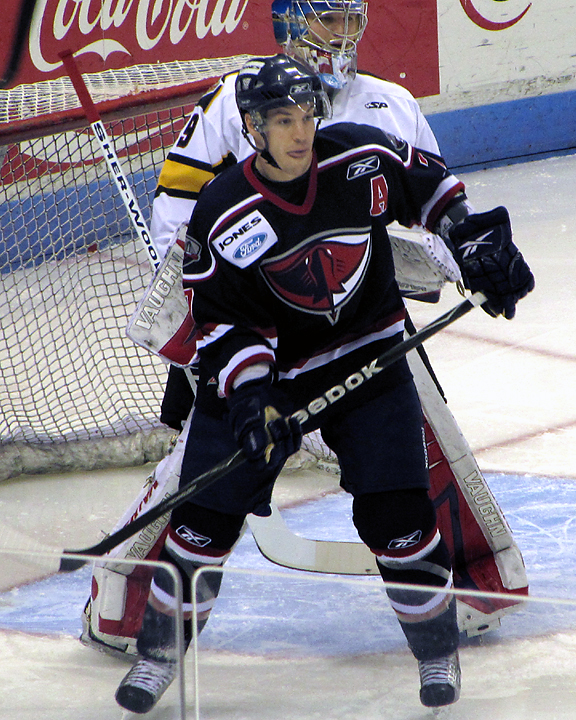
Carbery with the South Carolina Stingrays in 2010

Born in Victoria, British Columbia, Carbery started his junior career with the Peninsula Panthers of the Vancouver Island Junior Hockey League (VIJHL) in the 1999–2000 season. He was a key factor in the club going to the league finals, putting up 34 goals and 42 assists for 76 points to become the leading rookie scorer in Panthers franchise history. Carbery played junior hockey with the Cowichan Valley Capitals of the British Columbia Hockey League in the 2000–01 season, scoring 58 points during regular season play.

In 2002, Carbery attended the University of Alaska Anchorage, where he netted 1 goal and 2 assists in 26 games. Carbery attended St. Norbert College from 2003 to 2006, finishing out his NCAA career with 103 points in the regular season.

Carbery turned professional in 2006, signing with the Tulsa Oilers of the Central Hockey League (CHL). During the 2006–07 season, he scored 44 points (16 goals, 28 assists) over 63 games in the regular season.

In 2007, Carbery moved to the ECHL, where he split the season between the Bakersfield Condors (18 games, 3 goals, 3 assists), the Stockton Thunder (20 games, 0 goals, 2 assists), and the Fresno Falcons (20 games, 2 goals, 2 assists). Carbery also saw playoff action with the Falcons in 2008, playing one game in the National Conference quarterfinals.

Carbery remained with the Falcons for the beginning of the 2008–09 season, putting up 13 points over 29 games in the regular season. Following the suspension of Falcons operations, Carbery joined the South Carolina Stingrays' roster, scoring 29 points (12 goals, 7 assists) over 39 games. Carbery's playoff action with the Stingrays culminated in 5 goals, 8 assists, and a Kelly Cup championship.

On September 11, 2009, Carbery re-signed as a free agent to a one-year contract to return to South Carolina. In the 2009–10 season on January 7, 2010, Carbery was named an alternate captain for the Stingrays. He achieved a Gordie Howe hat trick on January 16, 2010, against the Kalamazoo Wings. On January 25, 2010, his goal against the Reading Royals aided the Stingrays in tying the ECHL record for the most players with a point in one game. All 15 skaters registered a point in the 8–5 victory over the Royals.

== Coaching career ==
On August 31, 2010, Carbery announced his retirement from professional ice hockey and was named the Stingrays' assistant coach. He served as an assistant coach for the 2010–11 season, helping lead the team to a 37–29–3–3 regular season record and an appearance in the 2011 Kelly Cup playoffs.

After Stingrays head coach Cail MacLean resigned to accept a position with the American Hockey League's Abbotsford Heat in July 2011, Carbery was named the team's sixth head coach and director of hockey operations. At the age of 29, he was the youngest head coach in the ECHL at the time. He would eventually leave the Stingrays in 2016 to become head coach of the Saginaw Spirit in the Ontario Hockey League. After one season, he left the Spirit to become an assistant for the Providence Bruins in the American Hockey League (AHL).

Returning to the Washington Capitals farm system where he had begun his coaching career, Carbery was announced as the head coach of the Hershey Bears in the AHL on June 26, 2018. In 2021, he led the team to the Macgregor Kilpatrick Trophy in 2021, the AHL's regular season league championship, and won the Louis A. R. Pieri Memorial Award for coach of the year.

On July 17, 2021, Carbery was hired as an assistant coach by the Toronto Maple Leafs.

On May 30, 2023, Carbery was named head coach of the Washington Capitals. In his first season, the Capitals clinched the second wild card and eighth seed in the Eastern Conference, but were swept in the first round of the 2024 playoffs by the Presidents' Trophy-winning New York Rangers. The following 2024–25 season was an unexpected success for the Capitals, who finished the regular season as the top-ranked team in the Eastern Conference, and second in the league overall. Carbery was widely credited with improving the performance of the roster. He received the Jack Adams Award, given annually to the NHL's best coach, in recognition of his work.

== Career statistics ==
			Regular season					Playoffs
Season	Team	League	GP	G	A	Pts	PIM	GP	G	A	Pts	PIM
2000–01	Cowichan Valley Capitals	BCHL	60	31	27	58	32	—	—	—	—	—
2002–03	Alaska Anchorage Seawolves	WCHA	26	1	2	3	22	—	—	—	—	—
2003–04	St. Norbert Green Knights	NCHA	29	20	21	41	8	—	—	—	—	—
2004–05	St. Norbert Green Knights	NCHA	30	24	12	36	40	—	—	—	—	—
2005–06	St. Norbert Green Knights	NCHA	28	11	12	23	41	—	—	—	—	—
2006–07	Tulsa Oilers	CHL	63	16	28	44	157	—	—	—	—	—
2007–08	Bakersfield Condors	ECHL	18	3	3	6	44	—	—	—	—	—
2007–08	Stockton Thunder	ECHL	20	0	2	2	43	—	—	—	—	—
2007–08	Fresno Falcons	ECHL	20	2	2	4	68	1	0	0	0	0
2008–09	Fresno Falcons	ECHL	29	5	8	13	68	—	—	—	—	—
2008–09	South Carolina Stingrays	ECHL	39	12	7	19	126	23	5	8	13	62
2009–10	South Carolina Stingrays	ECHL	55	10	19	29	132	5	0	0	0	20
ECHL totals			181	32	41	73	481	29	5	8	13	82

== Head coaching record ==
Team	Year	Regular season						Postseason			
Team	Year	G	W	L	OTL	Pts	Finish	W	L	Win %	Result
WSH	2023–24	82	40	31	11	91	4th in Metropolitan	0	4	.000	Lost in first round (NYR)
WSH	2024–25	82	51	22	9	111	1st in Metropolitan	5	5	.500	Lost in second round (CAR)
WSH	2025–26	82	43	30	9	95	4th in Metropolitan	—	—	—	Missed playoffs
Total		246	134	83	29			5	9	.357	2 playoff appearances

== Awards ==
- NCHA All-Academic Team – 2004–05, 2005–06
- South Carolina Stingrays' Jerry Zucker Community Service Award – March 2009
- Coach of the Year (ECHL) – 2013–14
- Louis A. R. Pieri Memorial Award (AHL) 2020–21
- Jack Adams Award (NHL) 2024–25

Awards
Preceded by Rick Tocchet	Jack Adams Award winner 2025	Succeeded by Jon Cooper
Sporting positions
Preceded by Cail MacLean	Head coach of the South Carolina Stingrays; 2011–2016	Succeeded by Ryan Warsofsky
Preceded by Troy Mann	Head coach of the Hershey Bears; 2018–2021	Succeeded by Scott Allen
Preceded by Peter Laviolette	Head coach of the Washington Capitals; 2023–present	Incumbent
