= Nate Kiser =

American ice hockey player (born 1982)

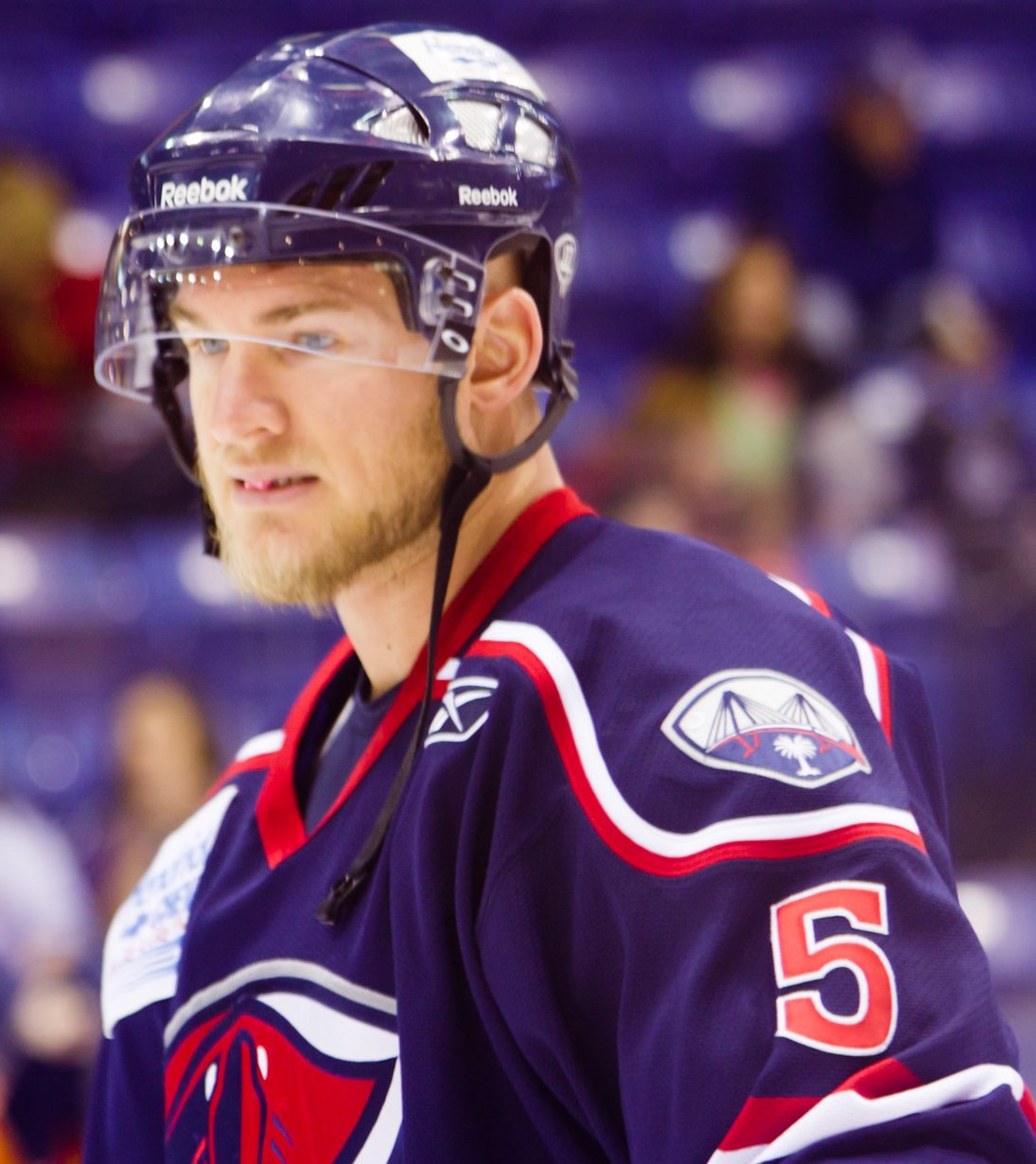
- Born: May 4, 1982 (age 43) Southgate, Michigan, U.S.
- Height: 6 ft 1 in (185 cm)
- Weight: 225 lb (102 kg; 16 st 1 lb)
- Position: Defense
- Shot: Right
- Played for: AHL; Syracuse Crunch; Portland Pirates; Albany River Rats; ECHL; Dayton Bombers; South Carolina Stingrays
- NHL draft: 160th overall, 2000; Phoenix Coyotes
- Playing career: 2003–2011

Nate Kiser (born May 4, 1982) is an American former professional ice hockey defenseman.

== Playing career ==
Kiser started his junior career with the Compuware Ambassadors of the NAHL, where he played from 1998 to 1999, scoring 5 points in goals and assists and spending a combined 46 minutes in the penalty box during regular season play.

Kiser joined the Plymouth Whalers in the OHL from 1999 to 2003. While with the Whalers, he scored 41 points in combined goals and assists and earned 473 penalty minutes during regular season play. In the post-season, Kiser netted 12 points and 80 penalty minutes.

In 2000, Kiser was picked by the Phoenix Coyotes in the 5th round of the NHL draft. He remained, however, with the Plymouth Whalers.

Kiser turned pro in 2003, moving to the ECHL's Dayton Bombers, where he played from 2003 to 2004. While with the Bombers, he scored 15 points during regular season play and spent 144 minutes in the penalty box. Kiser was also called up to the AHL's Syracuse Crunch, for 5 games, where he earned 1 point and 14 penalty minutes in the regular season.

In 2004, Kiser moved to the South Carolina Stingrays. While with the Stingrays, Kiser has been called up to the AHL's Portland Pirates and Albany River Rats for 5 games and 1 game, respectively. Since joining the Stingrays, Kiser has earned 102 points and 992 penalty minutes in regular season play, with 11 points and 116 penalty minutes in the post-season.

After the February 20, 2010, Stingrays' "Pink in the Rink" game in support of Susan G. Komen for the Cure, Kiser's pink #5 jersey garnered $2,000 at auction for the breast cancer foundation.

Kiser retired following the 2010–11 ECHL season. On October 14, 2011, the South Carolina Stingrays inducted Kiser into the Stingrays Hall of Fame at the North Charleston Coliseum.

== Career statistics ==
			Regular season					Playoffs
Season	Team	League	GP	G	A	Pts	PIM	GP	G	A	Pts	PIM
1998–99	Compuware Ambassadors	NAHL	32	2	3	5	46	—	—	—	—	—
1999–2000	Plymouth Whalers	OHL	63	3	5	8	102	23	1	1	2	18
2000–01	Plymouth Whalers	OHL	62	1	8	9	105	13	0	1	1	26
2001–02	Plymouth Whalers	OHL	60	3	6	9	134	6	0	0	0	10
2002–03	Plymouth Whalers	OHL	52	6	9	15	132	18	2	7	9	26
2003–04	Syracuse Crunch	AHL	5	0	1	1	14	—	—	—	—	—
2003–04	Dayton Bombers	ECHL	63	5	10	15	144	—	—	—	—	—
2004–05	Portland Pirates	AHL	5	0	0	0	29	—	—	—	—	—
2004–05	South Carolina Stingrays	ECHL	58	2	11	13	173	4	0	2	2	20
2005–06	South Carolina Stingrays	ECHL	61	0	12	12	174	5	1	1	2	8
2005–06	Albany River Rats	AHL	1	0	0	0	5	—	—	—	—	—
2006–07	South Carolina Stingrays	ECHL	64	5	15	20	222	—	—	—	—	—
2007–08	South Carolina Stingrays	ECHL	53	5	22	27	169	20	1	2	3	47
2008–09	South Carolina Stingrays	ECHL	56	7	13	20	174	17	1	3	4	41
2009–10	South Carolina Stingrays	ECHL	50	1	10	11	94	5	0	0	0	10
2010–11	South Carolina Stingrays	ECHL	70	1	11	12	125	2	0	0	0	4
AHL totals			11	0	1	1	48	—	—	—	—	—
ECHL totals			475	26	104	130	1275	53	3	8	11	130
