= Jerry Zucker (businessman) =

Israeli-American businessman (1949–2008)

- Born: August 24, 1949; Tel Aviv, Israel
- Died: April 12, 2008 (aged 58); Charleston, South Carolina, US
- Education: University of Florida
- Occupations: Businessman, inventor, investor, philanthropist.
- Known for: Philanthropy
- Spouse: Anita Zucker (m. 1970)
- Children: 3

Jerry Zucker (August 24, 1949 – April 12, 2008) was an Israeli-born American businessman, investor, inventor and philanthropist.

== Early life and education ==
Jerry Zucker was born 24 August 1949 in Tel Aviv, Israel, one of three children born to Leon Zucker and Zipora Zucker (née Shlifkovitz), the other two being his older brother Jacob and his younger sister Rochelle. His parents were both Holocaust survivors. Zucker immigrated to the United States through Ellis Island in 1952. As a child, he lived in South Carolina, Florida, and New Jersey, where he attended Jewish day schools his parents helped found. As a young man, Zucker attended the University of Florida, majoring in chemistry, mathematics, and physics. He later earned an M.S. in electrical engineering. Zucker lived most of his adult life in Charleston, South Carolina.

== Career ==
Zucker was president and CEO of the InterTech Group. He was President and CEO of the Polymer Group at the time it acquired the Montreal-based Dominion Textile Company in 1997; he resigned from Polymer Group in 2003. In 2006, he acquired the Hudson's Bay Company of Canada, North America's oldest company (established by English royal charter in 1670) for $1.1 billion (equivalent to $1.82 billion in 2026 adjusted for inflation) becoming its Governor (Company Chairman) and CEO. Aside from business Zucker was also a minority owner of the minor league hockey team South Carolina Stingrays of the ECHL from 1995 until his death. Under his ownership, the team won the 1997 and 2001 Kelly Cup league championship. He ranked #354 on Forbes 400 Richest Americans and #746 on Forbes Billionaire List 2006. In 2008, Forbes placed his wealth at $1.2 billion (~$1.71 billion in 2024) USD. Regarded as a highly accomplished inventor and generous philanthropist, Zucker held over 350 patents in his lifetime and donated millions of dollars to international medical missions as well as local charities.

== Personal life and death ==
Zucker lived with his family in Charleston, South Carolina. He died from a brain tumor on 12 April 2008 at the age of 58. Zucker was survived by his wife Anita (née Goldberg), his high school sweetheart to whom he had been married for 38 years and their three children Jonathan, Andrea and Jeffrey.

== Legacy ==
Shortly after Zucker's death, the Charleston County School Board decided to name a new North Charleston middle school in his honor. The Jerry Zucker Middle School of Science opened on August 24, 2008, which would have been Zucker's 59th birthday.

The South Carolina Stingrays, of which Zucker was part owner, adorned their helmets with a "JZ" sticker; the practice continues. The team also recognized his contributions to the team and the community by posthumously inducting him into the Stingrays Hockey Hall of Fame on March 21, 2009. The Stingrays organization unveiled the Jerry Zucker Community Service award, to be given annually to the Stingrays player who had the greatest impact on the local community. The first to receive the award was Stingrays forward Spencer Carbery. The Jerry Zucker Ride for Hope, started in October 2008, provides fundraising efforts for cancer research at the Hollings Cancer Center at the Medical University of South Carolina.

In June 2009, Zucker's family made a donation of $2 million (~$2.83 million in 2024) in Zucker's name to the Medical University of South Carolina. $1 million was allocated for the establishment of the Jerry Zucker Endowed Chair in Brain Tumor Research. The remainder was used to support spinal cord research and provide neurological care and medical training in Tanzania.
