= Huntsville Blast =

Defunct minor league ice hockey team

- City: Huntsville, Alabama
- League: East Coast Hockey League
- Founded: 1981 (In the CHL)
- Operated: 1993–1994
- Home arena: Von Braun Center Arena
- Owners: Pro Hockey Partners, LLC
- Head coach: Steve Gatzos; Victor Posa
- Captain: Greg Geldart

Franchise history
- 1981–1983: Nashville South Stars
- 1983–1990: Virginia Lancers
- 1990–1992: Roanoke Valley Rebels
- 1992–1993: Roanoke Valley Rampage
- 1993–1994: Huntsville Blast
- 1994–2001: Tallahassee Tiger Sharks
- 2001–2002: Macon Whoopee
- 2002–2003: Lexington Men O' War
- 2005–2025: Utah Grizzlies
- 2026-present: Trenton Ironhawks

The Huntsville Blast were a minor league professional ice hockey team and member of the East Coast Hockey League (ECHL). The Blast played at the Von Braun Center in Huntsville, Alabama, for the 1993–94 ECHL season. Previously the franchise played as the Roanoke Valley Rampage in Vinton, Virginia, prior to their relocation following the 1992–93 season. Following their lone season in Huntsville, the franchise relocated to Tallahassee, Florida, where they were rebranded as the Tallahassee Tiger Sharks.

The Roanoke Valley Rebels were sold by Harry Brabham to businessman, Larry Revo, in 1992. The team was not doing well and he agreed to turn the team over to the league in 1994 and the Huntsville Hockey Club Inc. took over operations of the team. In May 1994, Revo then sold the team to Elmore Sports Group. Elmore moved the team to Tallahassee and they became the Tallahassee Tiger Sharks. They would later become the Macon Whoopee (ECHL) and the Lexington Men O' War. They ultimately became the Utah Grizzlies until 2025. The team was sold in 2025 to Pro Hockey Partners, LLC, which will be moving the team to Trenton, New Jersey for the 2026 season, becoming the Trenton Ironhawks.

As of February 2008, the Blast moniker has been adopted by the women's-only hockey league team in Huntsville.

In their one playoff appearance they lost to the Birmingham Bulls in the first round
