= Anita Zucker =

Governor of the Hudson Bay Company

- Born: Anita Goldberg; 1951 or 1952 (age 74–75)
- Citizenship: American
- Education: University of Florida; University of North Florida
- Occupations: Businesswoman, philanthropist
- Known for: Chairperson and CEO, Intertech Group
- Spouse: Jerry Zucker
- Children: 3

Anita Zucker (nee Goldberg, born 1951/1952) is an American businesswoman and philanthropist. She was the chair at the Hudson's Bay Company. Taking over after her husband's death in April 2008, she is the chairperson and former chief executive officer (CEO) of The Intertech Group.

== Early life and education ==
Born Anita Goldberg, she is the daughter of Holocaust survivors, Rose and Carl Goldberg. She graduated from the University of Florida and received a Master of Arts from the University of North Florida.

== Career ==
After moving with her husband Jerry to the Charleston area in 1978, the couple launched InterTech in 1982.

She is the widow of Jerry Zucker, and took over his role as chairman and chief executive officer of the Intertech Group following his death in 2008 from a brain tumor.

She owns the Carolina Ice Palace and is part owner of the South Carolina Stingrays ice hockey team.

As of February 2023, she is the 1,600th richest person in the world (up from 1,729th in 2022), with an estimated wealth of US $1.9 billion. She has three children: Jonathan Zucker, Andrea Muzin and Jeffrey Zucker. She lives in Charleston, South Carolina.

== Politics ==
Zucker is a member of the Republican Party, and she endorsed Mitt Romney in January 2012. A financial supporter of Lindsey Graham, she was a co-chair in South Carolina of Jeb Bush's campaign for the Republican party nomination in South Carolina in 2016.

== Philanthropy ==
Zucker is part of the Coastal Community Foundation and Trident United Way, and is a trustee of the Saul Alexander Foundation and the Jewish Endowment Fund. She has served on the boards of the Charleston Metro Chamber of Commerce, the MUSC Foundation, and Porter-Gaud School.

In November 2014, she donated $4 million to The Citadel, The Military College of South Carolina for education programs. In return, The Citadel named its School of Education after the Zucker family, the first of The Citadel's five schools to be named after a major donor.

== Personal life ==
She was married to Jerry Zucker, until his death, and they had three children, Jonathan Zucker, Andrea Muzin and Jeffrey Zucker. Jonathan is the president of the InterTech Group. Jeffrey is an entrepreneur in the cannabis industry. She lives in Charleston, South Carolina.
