= Coastal Community Foundation =

U.S. nonprofit organization

Coastal Community Foundation of South Carolina Inc. is a public 501(c)(3) charity as classified by the US Internal Revenue Service. Since 2006 it has grown to be the largest grant-making entity in South Carolina serving donors and nonprofits in nine counties of the Lowcountry region (Charleston, Dorchester, Colleton, Berkeley, Hampton, Jasper, Beaufort, Georgetown, and most recently Horry). The foundation was created in 1974 with a gift of $9,000 from the Historic Rotary Club of Charleston, facilitated by Ted Stern, Howard Edwards, Mal Haven (namesake of the Haven Award), and others. The foundation has grown rapidly since 2009, in some years faster than all but 3% of community foundations nationwide. Its 14 person staff manage investments of $220 million and distribute in excess of $20 million in grants to the community. Donors to 650+ funds direct grants to more than 700 nonprofit organizations each year. Since 2012 Coastal Community Foundation has received more donations than all other South Carolina nonprofits except for two, substantially larger, organizations (i.e., MUSC and The Citadel).

== Community leadership ==
The foundation assists hundreds of nonprofit organizations in improving their operations through consulting and mentoring. In particular, in May 2014 Coastal Community Foundation launched Lowcountry Giving Day a community-wide, online challenge that trained nonprofits on the use of online giving tools and social media. It generated $4 million for local charities on its inaugural day. and nearly double that amount in its second year. Anita Zucker and other philanthropic leaders pledged to augment giving on Lowcountry Giving Day in proportion to the gifts made to each nonprofit participant.

The foundation also works with donors to create meaningful philanthropic experiences. Starting in 2010, Social Venture Partners Charleston is one such donor education forum. It is affiliated with Social Venture Partners International and has granted out more than $155,000 since inception.
