= South Carolina Stingrays =

Minor league ice hockey team

- City: North Charleston, South Carolina
- League: ECHL
- Conference: Eastern
- Division: South
- Founded: 1993
- Home arena: North Charleston Coliseum
- Colors: Navy blue, red, white, silver
- Owner: Todd Halloran
- Head coach: Jesse Kallechy
- Media: The Post and Courier ECHL.TV (internet)
- Affiliates: Washington Capitals (NHL); Hershey Bears (AHL)
- Website: stingrayshockey.com

Championships
- Regular season titles: 2 (1996–97, 2024–25)
- Division titles: 8 (1994–95, 1996–97, 1997–98, 2000–01, 2013–14, 2015–16, 2022–23, 2024–25)
- Conference titles: 6 (1997, 2001, 2009, 2015, 2017, 2021)
- Kelly Cups: 3 (1997, 2001, 2009)

The South Carolina Stingrays are a professional minor league ice hockey team based in North Charleston, South Carolina. The Stingrays play in the South Division of the ECHL's Eastern Conference. They play their home games at the North Charleston Coliseum. The Carolina Ice Palace, also located in North Charleston, serves as a practice facility and backup arena. Established in 1993, the team has been owned by a group of local businesses since 1995. The team was affiliated with the Washington Capitals of the National Hockey League and the Hershey Bears of the American Hockey League from 2004 to July 2012, when the Capitals announced their affiliation with the ECHL's Reading Royals. On June 26, 2014, after two seasons of affiliation with the Boston Bruins and the Providence Bruins, the Washington Capitals announced a new affiliation agreement with the Stingrays beginning with the 2014–15 season. The Stingrays also returned to their affiliation with the Hershey Bears at this time.

The Stingrays are the first professional ice hockey team in South Carolina. With the relocation of the Johnstown Chiefs to Greenville, South Carolina in 2010, the Stingrays became the oldest continuously operational ECHL franchise to remain in its founding city (the Wheeling Nailers have been in Wheeling since 1992 but are a relocated franchise).

The Stingrays have finished with the best record in the ECHL twice, and qualified for the playoffs in all but three seasons. With Kelly Cup championships in 1997, 2001 and 2009, the Stingrays are tied with the Hampton Roads Admirals and the Alaska Aces for most league championships. Over forty former Stingrays have gone on to play in the National Hockey League, with six playing for Stanley Cup-winning teams; Rich Peverley with the Boston Bruins in 2011, and Braden Holtby, Nathan Walker, Philipp Grubauer, and Pheonix Copley with the Washington Capitals in 2018, and Logan Thompson with the Vegas Golden Knights in 2023.

The team had initial success at the box office; during its first season (1993–94) the team averaged 9,151 fans a game — one of the largest attendances in minor league hockey. Despite ongoing success on the ice, that level was not sustained; average attendance since 2003 has been less than half that number.

== Team history ==
Original Stingrays logo, used 1993–2000; revived for throwback third jerseys in 2011–12.

=== Birth of the franchise ===
The South Carolina Stingrays were founded in 1993 as an expansion team in the East Coast Hockey League (ECHL). Its management team included Joseph Scanlon as president/CEO and retired National Hockey League (NHL) player Rick Vaive as head coach. The team was originally to be designated the South Carolina Sharks, but eventually settled on the Stingrays name to avoid a copyright dispute with the NHL's San Jose Sharks. In late 1993, Scanlon filed a lawsuit in a Canadian court in an attempt to wrest control of the team from its ownership group. He was replaced as president and CEO by retired NHL Hall of Fame member Marcel Dionne in December of that year. Dionne was accused of assault in February 1994 by Lynn Bernstein, an ally of Scanlon, over a dispute regarding the removal of advertising signs at the North Charleston Coliseum, but was later acquitted. Following dismissal of Scanlon's lawsuit, the ECHL board of governors ended the power struggle when it approved the sale of the franchise from its Canadian ownership group to a local investment group led by Edwin Pearlstine, owner of Pearlstine Distribution, the local Budweiser distributor. The group also included Jerry and Anita Zucker, Harvey Nathan and Lynn Bernstein (owners of local restaurant Nathan's Deli), and the Greenwald family of Seabrook Island. Dionne remained the franchise's president and CEO.

In early 1995, along with Charlotte, Greensboro, and Hampton Roads, the team was offered an expansion spot by the American Hockey League (AHL), the intermediate level between the ECHL and the NHL. However, team management decided to remain in the ECHL, citing a desire to retain the level of affordability for the team's fans. The other three franchises have since accepted AHL offers, becoming the Charlotte Checkers, Carolina Monarchs, and Norfolk Admirals, respectively. Later that year, Dionne left the Stingrays organization. Vaive succeeded Dionne as director of hockey operations while retaining his head coaching position, thus giving him more control over personnel decisions.

=== Rick Vaive era (1993–98) ===
The Stingrays finished sixth in the East Division in their inaugural season and were eliminated in the first round of the 1993–94 playoffs by the Hampton Roads Admirals. Despite their early playoff exit, the team had several significant achievements during their inaugural season. Center Sylvain Fleury finished tenth among league skaters for total points with 95 points in 68 games played and scored a league season-high five goals in an 11–6 victory over the Greensboro Monarchs on December 26. Left winger Andy Bezeau was second in the league in penalty minutes, accumulating 352 minutes in 36 games (29 fewer games than Trevor Buchanan, the league leader with 422 minutes). From January 19–28, the Stingrays went on a six-game winning streak wherein they totaled 43 goals for and only 13 goals against, including two games in which they scored 11 goals each against their opponents (one of which, against the Huntington Blizzard, had 67 shots on goal by the Stingrays). The team led the league in attendance with an average of 9,151 fans per game.

In 1994–95, the team took the top spot in the Southern Division but were knocked out in the second round by the Nashville Knights. They set the current league record for the longest home winning streak that season with 18 victories at home between December 23, 1994, and March 19, 1995. Goaltender Steve Shields finished second in the league with a 2.68 goals against average (GAA), a 0.912 save percentage and 11 wins in 17 games, while Jason Fitzsimmons (who later served as assistant and then head coach for the Stingrays) finished sixth in the league with a 2.97 GAA, a 0.901 save percentage and 24 wins in 37 games played. The Stingrays drew the highest attendance in the league, averaging 8,589 fans per game.

The Stingrays returned to the East Division in 1995–96 and finished third in the regular season, falling in the second round of the playoffs to the Charlotte Checkers. They posted an 8-game road winning streak that season, lasting from December 15 until January 13, in which they accumulated 48 goals and surrendered 27 goals against. Defenseman Scott Boston finished sixth among top-scoring defensemen in the league with 58 total points in 67 games. The Stingrays fell to second place in league attendance with an average 7,447 fans per game.

In 1996–97, the Stingrays won both the ECHL championship Kelly Cup (defeating the Louisiana IceGators four games to one) and the Brabham Cup (awarded to the team with the best regular season record), becoming the first ECHL team and one of three overall to win both a regular season and postseason championship in the same year. The Alaska Aces (2006, 2011) and the Cincinnati Cyclones (2008) later accomplished this feat. Forwards Ed Courtenay and Mike Ross tied for the highest total points in the league, each with 110 points in combined goals and assists. Forward Dave Seitz finished seventh with 97 total points. Ross was also named the league's Most Valuable Player (MVP), the only member of the Stingrays to receive this distinction through the 2010–11 season. Goaltender Jason Fitzsimmons was selected as the Kelly Cup playoffs MVP. Fitzsimmons totaled 13 wins in 17 playoff games and achieved a 3.38 GAA with a 0.903 save percentage.

Following their Kelly Cup victory, ECHL management accused the franchise of circumventing the league's salary cap by colluding with the city of North Charleston to funnel money through a city-run youth hockey program to provide payouts to players. After two months of investigation by the league, the Stingrays were assessed a US$50,000 fine, and Vaive was suspended for the first six games of the 1997–98 season. The Internal Revenue Service determined that no state or federal tax laws were broken, but the incident sparked a re-evaluation by the ECHL of the teams' salary caps.

Early in the 1997–98 season, the Stingrays won a league-high 12 consecutive home games from October 24 to January 2 in which they accumulated 52 goals and allowed 24 goals against. Defenseman Chris Hynnes finished the regular season first in goals (19) and fourth in total points (58) among league defensemen. Goaltender Cory Cadden finished seventh in the league with a 2.85 GAA, a 0.907 save percentage and 30 wins in 45 games. The team finished at the top of the Southeast Division, but fell in a first round playoff series against their new in-state rival, the Pee Dee Pride. The Pride advanced after coming back from a three-goal deficit to win the fifth game of a best of five series in overtime. Vaive reported after the fact that replays indicated that the game-tying goal was invalid but the referee missed the call, resulting in the overtime period and the Stingrays' eventual defeat.

=== Rick Adduono era (1998–2002) ===
For the 1998–99 season, Vaive accepted the head coaching position with the AHL's Saint John Flames. His assistant coach, Rick Adduono, was tapped to take over as Vaive's replacement as head coach and general manager. Former Stingrays goaltender Jason Fitzsimmons was named assistant coach in Adduono's place. The Stingrays finished third in the Southeast Division, with defenseman Brad Dexter third in the league for top-scoring defensemen with 55 points in 19 goals and 26 assists. Forward Dave Seitz led the league in game-winning goals with 11, while goaltender Jody Lehman finished seventh among league netminders with a 2.72 GAA and a 0.916 save percentage. After receiving a first-round bye for the playoffs, the Stingrays fell in a second-round 3-game shutout to the Mississippi Sea Wolves. The final game was decided in overtime and ran to 110 minutes and 37 seconds, making it the fifth-longest overtime playoff game in league history as of the 2010–11 season.

The team finished fourth in the Southeast Division in 1999–2000. Brad Dexter again finished third in total points among league defensemen with 66. He placed first among defensemen and fifth among all skaters for assists with 59. The Stingrays set the league postseason record for most goals by one team in a two-game series with 11 goals in their two-game shutout of the Baton Rouge Kingfish in the preliminary round of the playoffs. The team eliminated in-state rivals Pee Dee Pride three games to two to advance to the second round, where they were shut out in three games by the Louisiana IceGators.

The Stingrays finished the 2000–01 season first in both the Southeast Division and the Southern Conference. Ryan Brindley finished third among league defensemen with an average 10 points per game. The team accrued a season-record 141 penalty minutes in one game against the Greensboro Monarchs on October 13, 2000. They finished second in the league that season with a 9-game overall winning streak and had a league-record 10-game road winning streak. The Stingrays defeated the Arkansas RiverBlades three games to one in the first round and the Mobile Mysticks three games to two in the second round before sweeping the Louisiana IceGators four games to none to win the Southern Conference championship. They faced and defeated the Trenton Titans (then captained by future Stingrays head coach Cail MacLean) in five games to win their second Kelly Cup championship. Forward Dave Seitz, who scored 13 goals and 15 assists during the playoffs, was named playoff MVP.

=== Jason Fitzsimmons era (2002–07) ===
After failing to advance to the first round of the ECHL playoffs the next season by losing a "play-in" game in the 2001–02 season to the Florida Everblades in their practice facility (a concert at the Coliseum forced the move), Adduono was released from his contract and was replaced by Fitzsimmons. Jared Bednar, another longtime Stingray, was made assistant coach later. Despite a long-standing association with the Buffalo Sabres, the Stingrays broke away just before the 2001–02 season and played three seasons as an independent team. For the 2004–05 season, the team agreed to an affiliation with the Washington Capitals.

From 2003 to 2006, the Stingrays experienced another run of first and second round playoff defeats. Despite a strong second-place finish in the Southeast Division in 2003, they fell three games to one to the Pee Dee Pride in the first round of the playoffs. The Stingrays moved to the Southern Division for the 2003–04 season, finishing fourth in the regular season and advancing to the second round of the playoffs, where they were swept three games to none by the Florida Everblades, the final game a crushing 8–2 loss. For the 2004–05 season, the Stingrays returned to the East Division, where they finished second in the regular season. They were defeated three games to one in the first round of the playoffs, again to the Everblades. The 2005–06 season marked the Stingrays' first year in the newly designated South Division, in which they have remained to the present day. They finished fourth in the regular season and defeated the Charlotte Checkers in the Kelly Cup playoffs' first round, only to fall in a second round sweep—three games to none—by the Gwinnett Gladiators.

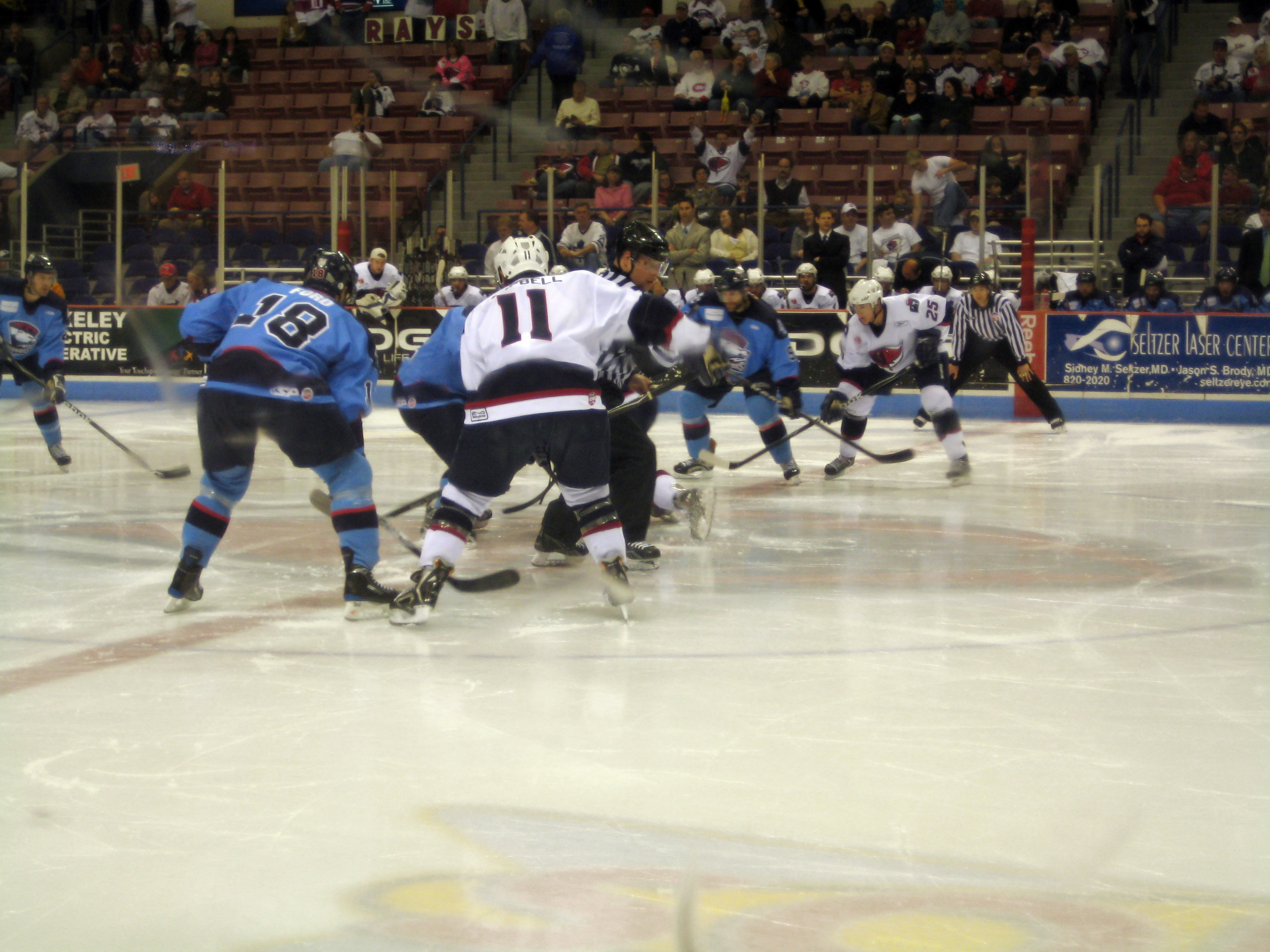
The Stingrays battle the Charlotte Checkers for control of the puck during the first round of the 2009 Kelly Cup playoffs.

=== Jared Bednar era (2007–09) ===
After failing to qualify for the ECHL playoffs for the only time in franchise history during the 2006–07 season, Fitzsimmons resigned, and was assigned by the Washington Capitals as a scout. Bednar took over as head coach, with Cail MacLean, who had been the captain for the Stingrays, as a part-time assistant while completing his studies at The Citadel. Bednar took the Stingrays to the Kelly Cup playoffs for both of his seasons as head coach. In the 2007–08 season, the Stingrays advanced to the American Conference finals, losing 4–1 to the Cincinnati Cyclones in a suspense-filled series wherein three games (including the final) were decided in overtime.

The Stingrays built on this momentum in the 2008–09 season, sweeping Cincinnati 4–0 in the conference finals and winning the Kelly Cup on the road in the culmination of a 4–3 series with the Alaska Aces. Bednar resigned shortly thereafter, joining the Calgary Flames' system in Abbotsford as assistant coach, and later earned his first AHL head coaching assignment with the St. Louis Blues' farm club in Peoria for 2010–11. MacLean was named head coach, with the assistant coach position becoming vacant. Building on their championship success, many players on the 2009 Kelly Cup team were called up to the American Hockey League during the 2009–10 season. Six players from the 2009 team played in the 2010 Calder Cup Championship – five for the victorious Hershey Bears, and one for the runner-up Texas Stars.

=== Cail MacLean era (2009–11) ===
This success, however, was short-lived. Despite a strong regular season showing that left the Stingrays tied with the South Division (and American Conference) leader Charlotte Checkers and North Division leader Kalamazoo Wings, the team ended up fourth seed in the 2010 Kelly Cup playoffs, falling three games to two in the first round to the eventual champions, the Cincinnati Cyclones. For a team that was the first in the ECHL to reach 30 wins that season (in a 5–3 victory over the Reading Royals in front of a record sellout crowd of 10,570), the first round defeat was disappointing to players and fans alike.

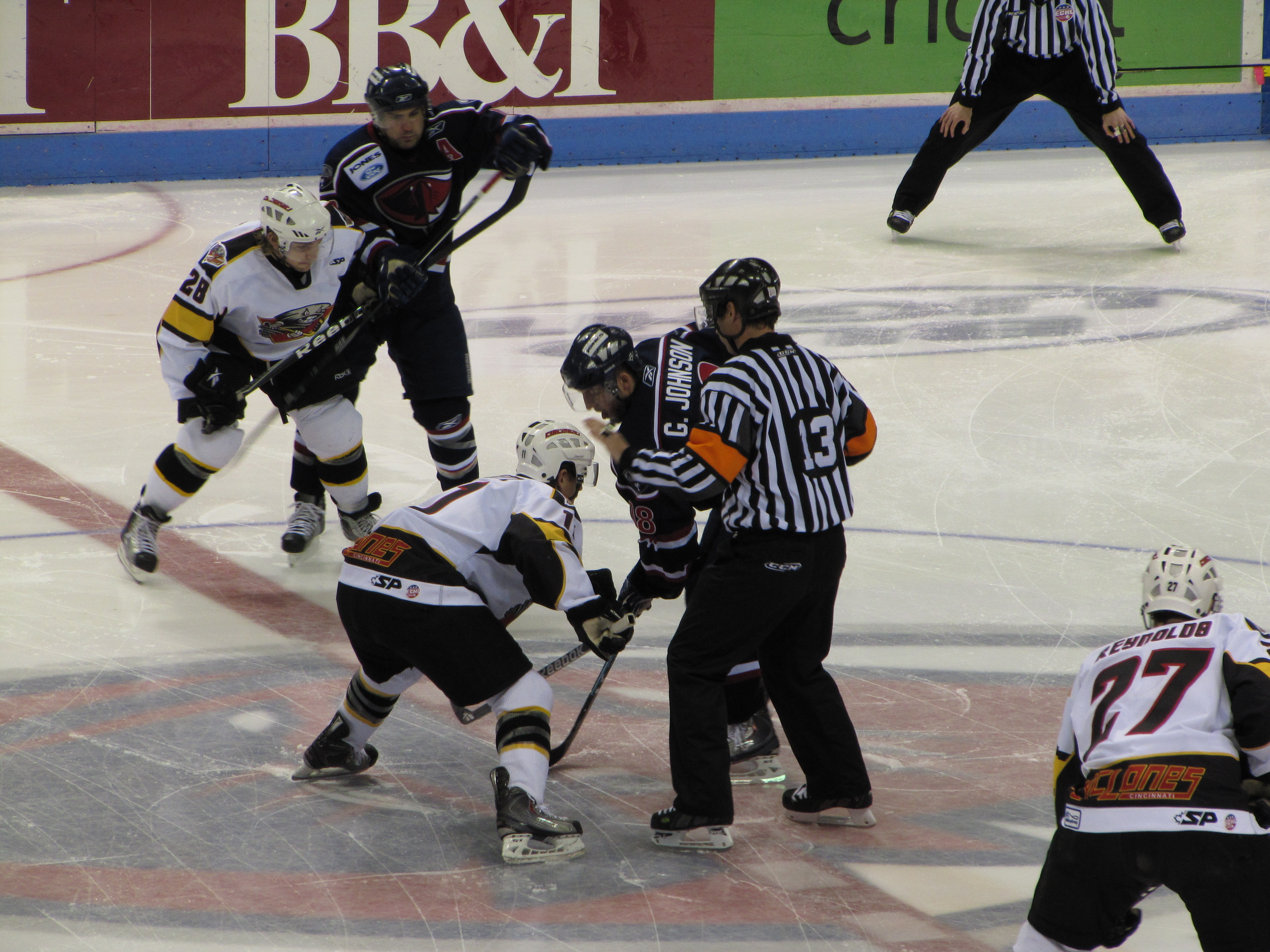
Gregg Johnson faces off against Barret Ehgoetz of the Cincinnati Cyclones during the 2009–10 season.

Former Stingray Rob Concannon was picked to succeed Darren Abbott as team president at the end of the 2009–10 season. In August 2010, the Stingrays announced that former forward Spencer Carbery had been named the team's assistant coach. With the return of forwards Maxime Lacroix and Pierre-Luc O'Brien—both of whom played a vital role in the 2009 Kelly Cup championship—the team looked to build momentum towards a fourth championship. However, injuries, call-ups, and ultimately inconsistent play on the ice resulted in another disappointing first round playoff loss, this time to the Wheeling Nailers.

A bright spot in the midst of the team's disappointing seasons came from a terrible tragedy. In February 2011, former Stingrays goaltender Kirk Daubenspeck—who played for the team from 1999 to 2006 and was part of the Kelly Cup championship team in 2001—was in a near-fatal car accident that resulted in a traumatic brain injury that left him in a coma for six days. Friends, family members and former teammates from the Stingrays, the Hershey Bears, Culver Military Academy and the University of Wisconsin (Daubenspeck's alma maters) banded together to raise money to help defray the extensive medical bills. The team sold T-shirts bearing Daubenspeck's name and number (29) at the season's remaining home games. In April 2011, current and former Stingrays donned their skates and took to the ice for the team's first ever alumni game, held to benefit the Daubenspeck family. The event (held at the Carolina Ice Palace) drew a capacity crowd of over 700 and raised over $20,000 in ticket sales and from a post-game jersey auction. Daubenspeck and his family were in attendance, and Daubenspeck dropped the game's ceremonial first puck.

=== Spencer Carbery era (2011–2016) ===
The team announced in July 2011 that head coach Cail MacLean had accepted the assistant coaching position for the AHL's Abbotsford Heat, a spot previously held by former Stingrays head coach Jared Bednar. Assistant coach Spencer Carbery was tapped to take MacLean's place, making him the team's sixth head coach and the youngest head coach in the league. In a break with recent practice, the team selected a new assistant coach from outside the organization. J.B. Bittner, previously an assistant coach for Ohio State University's ice hockey team as well as a former professional player, joined the team in September 2011. The team also faced some controversy when it was revealed that fan favorite and veteran enforcer Nate Kiser would not be returning to the Stingrays for the 2011–12 season. Kiser had not been offered a contract for the season and subsequently announced his retirement from professional hockey. To honor his contributions to the team over his seven-year career, the organization announced that Kiser would be inducted into the team's Hall of Fame on October 14, 2011, the opening night for the 2011–12 season.

On July 25, 2012, the Stingrays announced an affiliation deal with the NHL's Boston Bruins and their AHL affiliate Providence Bruins.

Spencer Carbery announced on September 4, 2013, that the team has agreed to terms with rookie forward Tory Allan and first-year defenseman Tom Janosz.

On June 26, 2014, the Washington Capitals announced an affiliation agreement with the Stingrays for the 2014–15 season giving the Stingrays two NHL affiliates for the season for what was intended to be a 20-team ECHL. In 2015, the ECHL Board of Directors voted to only allow one NHL affiliate per ECHL team following the merger with the Central Hockey League just before the 2014–15 season (a 28-team league) and the Boston Bruins switched their affiliation to the Atlanta Gladiators beginning with the 2015–16 season. The Capitals' affiliation with the Stingrays also included the Capitals sending their radio broadcaster to Charleston during selected 2015 ECHL playoff games, including the Kelly Cup Finals.

In the first round of the 2015 playoffs, the Stingrays defeated the Reading Royals in seven games. After dispatching the Florida Everblades in six games in the second round, the Stingrays faced the regular season champion Toledo Walleye in the Eastern Conference Finals. South Carolina won the first three games, but Toledo won the next three games to force a seventh game. Toledo was on the verge of becoming the sixth team in the history of North American sports to come back from an 0–3 deficit to win a playoff series, but South Carolina won the seventh game in the third overtime period to advance to the Kelly Cup Finals. In the championship series, the Stingrays faced the Allen Americans. Both teams split the first four games of the series, but the Americans won the fifth game to have a chance to clinch the Kelly Cup in South Carolina. In response, the Stingrays won the sixth game on home ice to force a seventh game back in Allen. However, they lost the seventh game of the series to the Americans, who subsequently won their first championship title since coming from the Central Hockey League before the 2014–15 season.

In the 2015–16 season, the Stingrays would once again finish first in their division and qualify for the Kelly Cup playoffs. The team made it to the conference finals before losing to the Wheeling Nailers 4-games-to-3. After the season ended, head coach Spencer Carbery would leave to take the head coaching position with the Saginaw Spirit of the Ontario Hockey League.

=== Ryan Warsofsky era (2016–18) ===
On July 6, 2016, Stingrays' assistant coach Ryan Warsofsky (later an NHL head coach) was announced as the new head coach and director of hockey operations.

The 2016–17 season was also successful for the team. After the Stingrays made the playoffs with two games left in the season, they defeated the lower-seeded Greenville Swamp Rabbits in six games, before winning their second round series against the Florida Everblades in five games. They came back against the Manchester Monarchs in the Eastern Conference finals, winning in seven games after losing the first two games at home. Ultimately, the Stingrays were swept by the Colorado Eagles in four straight games in the Kelly Cup finals.

=== New ownership (2018–present) ===
On April 17, 2018, the Zucker family, part owners of the franchise since 1994 and the controlling interest since 2011, sold the majority stake of the franchise to Connecticut businessman Todd Halloran.

Following the 2017–18 season, Warsofsky was hired as an assistant coach with the Charlotte Checkers in the American Hockey League and was replaced by Spiros Anastas. Anastas kept the job for one season and the Stingrays were the last team to qualify for a spot in the 2019 Kelly Cup playoffs. They were then eliminated in five games by the Orlando Solar Bears and Anastas was fired on April 26, 2019. He was replaced by assistant coach Steve Bergin. Bergin then lead the team to a 44–14–4 record in the 2019–20 season, and were leading the league when the rest of the season was cancelled due to the coronavirus pandemic. Bergin won the 2020 John Brophy Award for coach of the year and then left to become an assistant coach for Sacred Heart University. Assistant Ryan Blair was then named the head coach for the 2020–21 season.

Blair was coach until March 7, 2022, when the Stingrays fired him. Brendan Kotyk replaced him as interim coach. He was coach through the rest of the 2021-22 season, named head coach before 2022-23, then fired at the end of the 2023-2024 season. Jared Nightingale took over as the Stingrays head coach for the 2024-25 season, leading the team to franchise records in points (109) and wins (52) in a single season. The Stingrays lost in the first round of the playoffs to the Orlando Solar Bears, and Nightingale was signed by the Rockford IceHogs, the AHL affiliate of the Chicago Blackhawks, to be their head coach.

David Warsofsky, the brother of former Stingrays head coach Ryan Warsofsky, took over as head coach after serving as a special coaching advisor for the Stingrays in the 2024-25 season.

== Team culture ==
Current Stingrays home and away jerseys, used since 2008.

=== Logos ===
The team's primary logo has evolved over the years. Beginning as a realistic rendition of a stingray, it transitioned through a cartoon-style representation before settling on the stylized version used today. The state flag of South Carolina was originally used as the secondary logo (worn on the jersey shoulders). It has since been replaced by a variety of logos representing team affiliation, anniversary celebrations, and team championships. The current secondary logo (worn on home jerseys) returns to its origins as a rendition of the state flag, while the tertiary logo (worn on away jerseys) gives tribute to the Charleston area with its representation of the Ravenel Bridge.

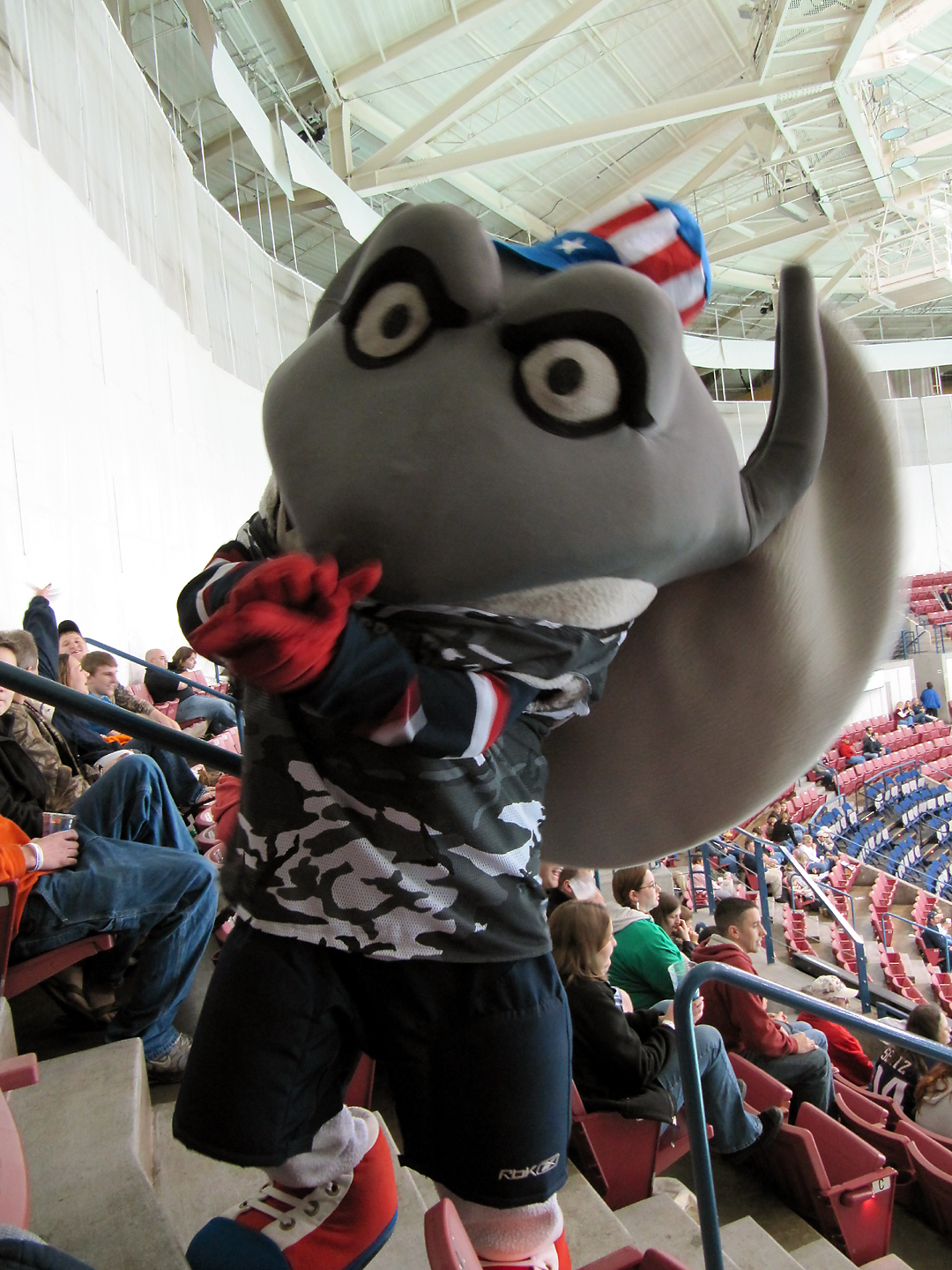
Cool Ray entertains fans during the Stingrays' Military Appreciation Night.

=== Mascot ===
The organization's mascot is Cool Ray, a stingray that currently resembles the previous Stingrays logo used from 2000 to 2008. Alongside the players, Cool Ray serves as the organization's ambassador to the local community, often appearing at local schools, athletic competitions and charity events. Cool Ray also provides entertainment and comic relief on ice and in the stands during games, and serves as the Stingrays' Kids Club mascot.

Additional mascots have included Little Puck, an anthropomorphic hockey puck who partnered with Cool Ray from 1993 to 2008, and Excalibear, the Carolina Ice Palace's mascot, who joined Cool Ray for the 2010–11 season.

=== Media ===
The Stingrays are covered by multiple media outlets. The Post and Courier provides newspaper coverage for the team. The team was covered by sports reporters Keith Namm and Gene Sapakoff from 1993 to 1998. Andrew Miller currently reports on the Stingrays and also authors a blog entitled "Rays the Roof," where he provides opinion pieces on the team's performance and transactions.

Television coverage of Stingrays games is provided over the internet on a pay-per-view or subscription basis by Flosports, with selected home games via Gray Television's Palmetto Sports and Entertainment channel via WCSC 5.7 and WIS 10.5.

Play-by-play Radio coverage of the Stingrays is handled by Brendan Reilly, the club's Manager of Communications and Broadcasting who joined the club in 2025. This coverage is available over the internet via the team's website.

The Stingrays maintain a strong online presence, utilizing social media outlets such as Facebook and Twitter to engage with fans. Video clips of team commercials and interviews are made available via "Stingrays TV," the Stingrays' YouTube channel.

=== Community service ===
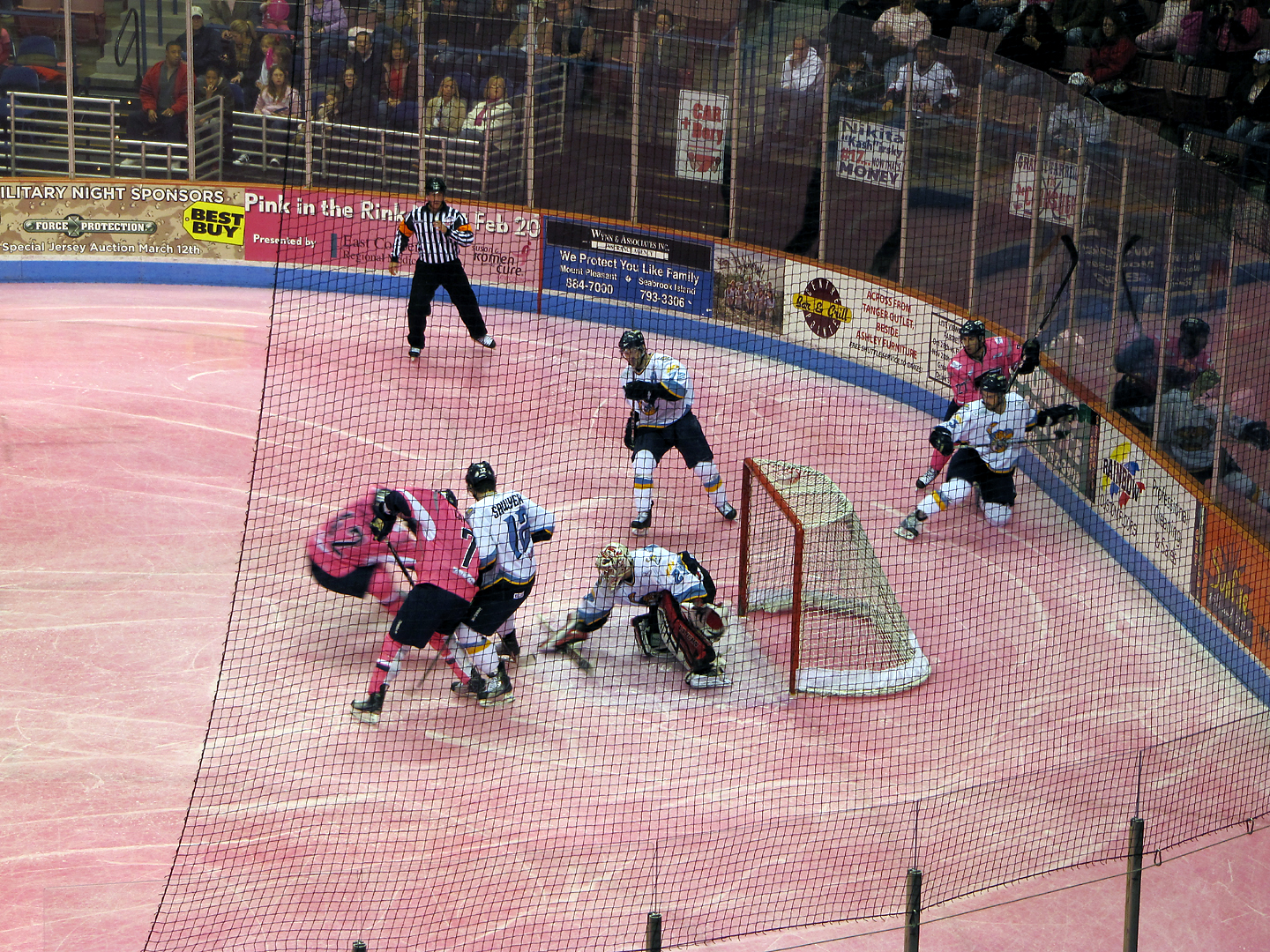
The Stingrays battle in front of the Toledo Walleye goal at Pink in the Rink 2010.

The Stingrays organization honors the legacy of former owner Jerry Zucker by taking an active role in supporting local charities, to include the MUSC Children's Hospital, Ronald McDonald House, and Hockey Players for Kids, an organization supporting local youth hockey, among others. Player involvement includes celebrity bartender events to raise donations for charity, autographed equipment auctions, and visiting and playing with hospitalized children.

The crowning event of the Stingrays season is the annual "Pink in the Rink" night, supporting Susan G. Komen for the Cure and the fight against breast cancer. Proceeds from ticket sales, vendor tables, and live and silent auctions featuring sports memorabilia including the actual game-used hockey sticks and jerseys were presented to the Lowcountry chapter of Susan G. Komen for the Cure. Pink in the Rink 2009 raised over $20,000, while the 2010 event raised over $40,000. The 2011 Pink in the Rink game raised the most to date, with donations in excess of $46,000. With more than $24,000 raised by the sixth annual event in 2012, the team's total donations since the event's inception in 2006 come to more than $143,000.

In honor of Jerry Zucker's contributions to the team and the local community, the Stingrays created the Jerry Zucker Community Service Award, to be presented yearly to the Stingrays player who made the most significant impact on the local community. Past awardees include Spencer Carbery (2008–09), Matt Scherer (2009–10), Jordan Pietrus (2010–11), Johann Kroll (2011–12), and Scooter Vaughan (2012–13).

== Season-by-season record ==
Regular season										Playoffs					
Season	GP	W	L	OTL	SOL	Pts	GF	GA	Standing	Year	Wild Card Round* Conf. 1st Round (2006–08)^{§}	1st round	2nd round	3rd round	Kelly Cup Finals
1993–94	68	33	26	3	6	75	294	291	6th, East	1994	—	L, 1–2, HRD	—	—	—
1994–95	68	42	19	7	—	91	225	215	1st, Southern	1995	—	W, 3–2, JHN	L, 1–3, NVL	—	—
1995–96	70	40	22	—	8	88	284	251	3rd, East	1996	—	W, 3–0, LOU	L, 2–3, CHR	—	—
1996–97	70	45	15	—	10	100	345	253	1st, East	1997	—	W, 3–0, CHR	W, 3–0, HRD	W, 3–2, PEN	W, 4–1, LA
1997–98	70	41	23	—	6	88	246	218	1st, Southeast	1998	—	L, 2–3, PD	—	—	—
1998–99	70	40	20	—	10	90	235	216	3rd, Southeast	1999	BYE	L, 0–3, MIS	—	—	—
1999–00	70	35	25	—	10	80	253	242	4th, Southeast	2000	W, 2–0, BR	W, 3–2, PD	L, 0–3, LA	—	—
2000–01	72	42	23	—	7	91	240	210	1st, Southeast	2001	BYE	W, 3–1, ARK	W, 3–2, MOB	W, 4–0, LA	W, 4–1, TRE
2001–02	72	39	26	—	7	85	235	225	4th, Southeast	2002	L, 1–3, FLA	—	—	—	—
2002–03	72	42	22	—	8	92	248	225	2nd, Southeast	2003	BYE	L, 1–3, PD	—	—	—
2003–04	72	39	28	—	5	83	205	202	4th, Southern	2004	BYE	W, 3–1, CBA	L, 0–3, FLA	—	—
2004–05	72	39	24	3	6	87	230	219	2nd, East	2005	—	L, 1–3, FLA	—	—	—
2005–06	72	32	25	7	8	79	230	237	4th, South	2006	W, 2–1, CHR	L, 0–3, GWT	—	—	—
2006–07	72	36	27	4	5	81	250	251	6th, South	2007	Did not qualify				
2007–08	72	47	22	2	1	97	256	192	2nd, South	2008	W, 3–2, AUG	W, 3–2, GWT	W, 3–2, CBA	L, 1–4, CIN	—
2008–09	71	42	23	2	4	90	249	187	2nd, South	2009	—	W, 4–2, CHR	W, 4–2, FLA	W, 4–0, CIN	W, 4–3, AK
2009–10	72	41	19	6	6	94	248	216	2nd, South	2010	—	L, 2–3, CIN	—	—	—
2010–11	72	37	29	3	3	80	194	204	2nd, South	2011	—	L, 1–3, WHL	—	—	—
2011–12	72	37	28	4	3	81	191	180	4th, South	2012	—	W, 3–1, GWT	L, 1–4, KAL	—	—
2012–13	72	38	26	5	3	84	198	171	3rd, South	2013	—	L, 0–4, GWT	—	—	—
2013–14	72	43	23	2	4	92	197	173	1st, South	2014	—	L, 0–4, WHL	—	—	—
2014–15	72	45	20	1	6	97	224	163	2nd, East	2015	—	W, 4–3, REA	W, 4–2, FLA	W, 4–3, TOL	L, 3–4, ALN
2015–16	72	44	18	7	3	98	224	162	1st, South	2016	—	W, 4–1, KAL	W, 4–3, ADK	L, 3–4, WHL	—
2016–17	72	40	28	3	1	84	227	211	3rd, South	2017	—	W, 4–2, GRN	W, 4–1, FLA	W, 4–3, MAN	L, 0–4, COL
2017–18	72	48	16	7	1	104	214	153	2nd, South	2018	—	L, 0–4, ORL	—	—	—
2018–19	72	35	31	5	1	76	221	223	3rd, South	2019	—	L, 1–4, ORL	—	—	—
2019–20	62	44	14	3	1	92	216	147	1st, South	2020	—	Season cancelled			
2020–21	70	34	23	10	3	81	216	212	4th, Eastern	2021	—	—	W, 3–2, FLA	W, 3–1, GRN	L, 1–3, FW
2021–22	72	28	38	6	0	62	187	238	7th, South	2022	Did not qualify				
2022–23	72	45	22	4	1	95	263	194	1st, South	2023		L, 2–4, FLA	—	—	—
2023–24	72	39	26	4	3	85	249	218	5th, South	2024	Did not qualify				
2024–25	72	52	15	3	2	109	279	161	1st, South	2025		L, 3–4, ORL	—	—	—
2025–26	72	45	23	1	3	94	223	204	2nd, South	2026		W, 4–2, ATL	L, 1–4, FLA	—	—

- ^{§}The ECHL used an unbalanced playoff format from the 1998–99 season to the 2003–04 season and again from the 2005–06 season to the 2007–08 season which resulted in five rounds.

== Players & personnel ==
=== Head coaches ===
From Rick Adduono (1998) to Spencer Carbery (2015), each Stingrays head coach (Jason Fitzsimmons, Jared Bednar, Cail MacLean and Spencer Carbery) has been the team's previous assistant and a former Stingrays player. Rob Concannon (named team president in 2010) played on the 1997 Kelly Cup team.

Since then, only the Warsofsky brothers have been previously in a role at the Stingrays.

=== Stingrays in the NHL ===
Many former Stingrays have played in the National Hockey League (NHL), and at least six, Rich Peverley, Braden Holtby, Philipp Grubauer, Nathan Walker, Pheonix Copley, and Logan Thompson have won the Stanley Cup. List of Stingrays alumni that advanced to the NHL and the first NHL team they appeared with:

Updated November 29, 2025.

- Jorge Alves (2005–07), Carolina Hurricanes
- Martin Biron (1997–98), Buffalo Sabres
- Erik Burgdoerfer (2014–15), Buffalo Sabres
- Sean Collins (2007–08), Washington Capitals
- David Cooper (1994–95), Toronto Maple Leafs
- Pheonix Copley (2013–14), St. Louis Blues
- Tommy Cross (2012–13), Boston Bruins
- Stefan Della Rovere (2008–09), St. Louis Blues
- Jeremy Duchesne (2008–09), Philadelphia Flyers
- Deryk Engelland (2005–06), Pittsburgh Penguins
- Joe Finley (2009–2011), Buffalo Sabres
- Jamie Fraser (2006–07), New York Islanders
- Zach Fucale (2020-21), Washington Capitals
- Sean Gauthier (1995–96), San Jose Sharks
- Andrew Gordon (2007–08), Washington Capitals
- Philipp Grubauer (2011–12), Washington Capitals
- Micheal Haley (2006–07), New York Islanders
- Braden Holtby (2009–10), Washington Capitals
- Jonas Johansson (2004–06), Washington Capitals
- Marc Johnstone (2020-21), Pittsburgh Penguins
- Tyler Lewington (2015–16), Washington Capitals
- Steve McLaren (1994–95), St. Louis Blues
- Garrett Mitchell (2011–12), Washington Capitals
- Mason Morelli (2020-21), Vegas Golden Knights
- Travis Morin (2006–09), Dallas Stars
- Michal Neuvirth (2008–09), Washington Capitals
- Rich Peverley (2004–05), Nashville Predators
- Steve Pinizzotto (2007–09), Vancouver Canucks
- Tyler Randell (2012–13), Boston Bruins
- James Reimer (2009), Toronto Maple Leafs
- Hunter Shepard (2020-22), Washington Capitals
- Steve Shields (1994–95), Buffalo Sabres
- Clay Stevenson (2022-23), Washington Capitals
- Joey Tenute (2004–05), Washington Capitals
- Logan Thompson (2019–20), Vegas Golden Knights
- Vitek Vanecek (2015–16, 2017–18), Washington Capitals
- Nathan Walker (2014–15), Washington Capitals
- Kyle Wilson (2006–07), Washington Capitals

Stingrays that played in the NHL before playing with the team:

- Chris Allen
- Casey Bailey
- Jason Bonsignore
- Kip Brennan
- Colby Cohen
- Ed Courtenay
- Marty Dallman
- Mark Dekanich
- Justin Duberman
- Matt Elich
- Chris Felix
- Trevor Gillies
- Shawn Hunwick
- Jamie Leach
- David LeNeveu
- Rick Lessard
- Jeff McLean
- Grant McNeill
- Jeremy Morin
- Gregg Naumenko
- Dylan Olsen
- Phil Oreskovic
- Kevin Quick
- Darren Reid
- Maxime Sauve
- Jared Staal
- Jeremy Stevenson
- Greg Stewart
- Garret Stroshein
- Allen York

=== Retired numbers ===
Updated April 15, 2026.

12 – Mark Bavis, who played from 1994 to 1996 when the Stingrays were an affiliate of the Buffalo Sabres. Bavis, by then a Los Angeles Kings scout, was killed along with Kings Director of Professional Scouting Garnet Bailey on United Airlines Flight 175 when Al-Qaeda terrorists hijacked the airliner, and steered it towards the World Trade Center during the September 11 attacks. The Stingrays retired his jersey before the start of the 2001–02 season.

- Regular season statistics: 87 GP, 30 G, 38 A, 68 PTS, 186 PIM.
- Playoff statistics: 17 GP, 3 G, 7 A, 10 PTS, 34 PIM.

14 – David Seitz, who played from 1996 to 2004 and was a popular forward on the franchise with team records in goals, assists, and points, including over 200 goals and 500 points overall, fifth on the ECHL's all-time assists list, and two ECHL Kelly Cups. Seitz's retirement, caused by an ECHL restriction on experienced players on a roster after the Stingrays signed players for a road trip, sent shockwaves through the community.

- Regular season statistics: 489 GP, 217 G, 370 A, 587 PTS, 503 PIM.
- Playoff Statistics: 58 GP, 29 G, 44 A, 73 PTS, 85 PIM.

24 – Brett Marietti, a popular player and former captain, retired after the 2002–03 season. Team management promptly retired his jersey in 2003. Marietti's tenure as captain ranks among the longest in ECHL history for a player to captain a single team.

- Regular season statistics: 550 GP, 194 G, 287 A, 481 PTS, 1127 PIM.
- Playoff statistics: 69 GP, 30 G, 32 A, 62 PTS, 129 PIM.

28 - Andrew Cherniwchan, a former captain who played 11 seasons with the Stingrays, had his number 28 retired on March 24, 2024. Cherniwchan spent his entire ECHL career with South Carolina playing in 456 games for the club, third most all-time in franchise history. His 157 goals and 338 points also rank third all-time in club history.

- Regular season statistics: 456 GP, 157 G, 181 A, 338 PTS, 516 PIM.
- Playoff statistics: 52 GP, 14 G, 15 A, 29 PTS, 118 PIM.

=== ECHL Hall of Fame members ===
- Tom Nemeth D, 1994–1995, Inducted 2009
- Rod Taylor F, 2002–2003, Inducted 2009
- David Seitz C, 1996–2004, Inducted 2012
- Jason Saal G, 1995–1996, Inducted 2018
- Jared Bednar D, as player 1995–1998, 1999, 2002; as coach 2002-2007 (assistant) 2007-2009 (head), Inducted 2020
- Brett Marietti F, 1994–2003, Inducted 2022
- Brad Dexter D, 1996-2001, Inducted 2024
- Jason Fitzsimmons G, as player 1994, 1996-1998; as coach 1998-2002 (assistant) 2002-2007 (head), Player Development, 2007-current, Inducted 2024

=== Stingrays Hall of Fame ===
- 2003: Rick Vaive, Mark Bavis
- 2004: Rob Concannon, Bret Marietti
- 2005: Dave Seitz
- 2006: Ed Courtenay
- 2007: Kirk Daubenspeck
- 2008: Brad Dexter
- 2009: Jerry Zucker (inducted posthumously)
- 2010: Jason Fitzsimmons
- 2011: Julie Thoennes (operations manager)
- 2012: Nate Kiser (inducted during 2011–12 season opener), Jared Bednar (inducted during regular ceremony)
- 2013: Matt Scherer
- 2014: Marty Clapton, Trevor Johnson
- 2015: Travis Morin
- 2022: Patrick Gaul, Jeff Jakaitis
- 2024: Andrew Cherniwchan

=== Individual award winners ===
ECHL Most Valuable Player

- Mike Ross: 1996–97
- Ryan Zapolski: 2012–13
- Jeff Jakaitis: 2014–15

ECHL Leading Scorer Award

- Ed Courtenay: 1996–97

Kelly Cup Playoffs MVP

- Jason Fitzsimmons: 1996–97
- Dave Seitz: 2000–01
- James Reimer: 2008–09

ECHL Goaltender of the Year

- Todd Ford: 2009–10
- Ryan Zapolski: 2012–13
- Jeff Jakaitis: 2013–14, 2014–15
- Parker Milner: 2017–18

John Brophy Award (ECHL Coach of the Year)

- Spencer Carbery: 2013–14
- Steve Bergin: 2019–20
- Jared Nightingale: 2024-25

John A. Daley Award (ECHL Rookie of the Year)

- Joey Tenute: 2004-2005
- Ryan Zapolski: 2012–13
- Austin Magera: 2023-24

All-ECHL First Team

- Ed Courtenay: 1996–97
- Mike Ross: 1996–97
- Chris Hynnes: 1997–98
- Travis Morin: 2008–09
- Todd Ford: 2009–10
- Ryan Zapolski: 2012–13
- Jeff Jakaitis: 2013–14, 2014–15
- Parker Milner: 2017–18

All-ECHL Second Team

- Scott Boston: 1994–95
- Sean Gauthier: 1995–96
- Chris Hynnes: 1996–97
- Brad Dexter: 1998–99, 1999–00
- Dave Seitz: 2001–02
- Joey Tenute: 2004–05
- Johann Kroll: 2011–12
- Parker Milner: 2019–20
- Cole Ully: 2020-21
- Austin Magera: 2023-24

All-ECHL Rookie Team

- Mark Ardelan: 2004–05
- Joey Tenute: 2004–05
- Philipp Grubauer: 2011–12
- Ryan Zapolski: 2012–13
- Vitek Vanecek: 2015–16
- Austin Magera: 2023-24
- Kyler Kupka: 2024-25

== ECHL team records ==
This is a list of ECHL records that the Stingrays either hold or are tied for the top position.

Updated April 14, 2011.

=== Regular season ===
- Longest home winning streak, one season (18) – 1994–95
- Longest road winning streak, one season (11) – 2014–15
- Most 50-or-more goal scorers, one season (2) – 1996–97
- Most 40-or-more goal scorers, one season (3) – 1996–97
- Most players with a point in one game (15) vs. Reading – January 22, 2010
- Most consecutive shutouts (3) – February 19–21, 2010
- Most consecutive shutouts, home (3) – February 19–21, 2010

=== Postseason ===
- Most Kelly Cup/Riley Cup championships (3) (tied with Hampton Roads and Alaska Aces).
- Most final series appearances (6)
- Most years in playoffs (26)
- Most playoff games (255)
- Most playoff wins in one playoff year (16) – 2009
- Most home playoff wins (75)
- Most playoff losses (125)
- Most road playoff losses (68)
- Most goals, one team, two-game series (11) vs. Baton Rouge – 2000
- Most goals, one team, five-game series (27) vs. Louisiana – 1997
- Most goals, both teams, five-game series (48) vs. Hampton Roads – 1997
- Most power-play goals in a playoff series (36) – 1997

Preceded by Richmond Renegades	Brabham Cup champions 1996–97	Succeeded by Louisiana IceGators
Preceded by Charlotte Checkers	Kelly Cup champions 1996–97	Succeeded by Hampton Roads Admirals
Preceded by Peoria Rivermen	Kelly Cup champions 2000–01	Succeeded by Greenville Grrrowl
Preceded by Cincinnati Cyclones	Kelly Cup champions 2008–09	Succeeded by Cincinnati Cyclones
