= Indianapolis Ice =

Former professional minor league ice hockey team in Indianapolis, Indiana

- City: Indianapolis, Indiana
- League: IHL, CHL
- Founded: 1988
- Operated: 1988–2004
- Home arena: Market Square Arena; Pepsi Coliseum; Conseco Fieldhouse

Championships
- Turner Cups: 1 1990
- Ray Miron President's Cup: 1 2000

The Indianapolis Ice were a minor league professional ice hockey team based in Indianapolis, Indiana, that played in the International Hockey League from 1988 to 1999 and in the Central Hockey League from 1999 to 2004. Their original home arena was Fairgrounds Coliseum (then known as the Pepsi Coliseum) at the Indiana State Fairgrounds, though they later moved to Market Square Arena. After Market Square Arena closed, the Ice played some games at the Conseco Fieldhouse in downtown Indianapolis. Their major rivals during the 1990s were the Fort Wayne Komets.

In 2004, the Indianapolis Ice relocated to Topeka, Kansas, and were renamed the Topeka Tarantulas. A Tier I junior ice hockey team in the United States Hockey League called the Indiana Ice replaced the minor league team in Indianapolis that same year.

The Ice won the 1990 Turner Cup and the 2000 Ray Miron Cup.

== Notable players ==
- Dominik Hašek – Joined in the 1990–91 season as goaltender

== Season-by-season records ==
Note: GP = Games played, W = Wins, L = Losses, T = Ties, OTL = Overtime Losses, Pts = Points, GF = Goals for, GA = Goals against, PIM = Penalties in minutes

=== IHL Ice ===
Season	GP	W	L	OTL	Pts	GF	GA	PIM	Finish	Playoffs
1988–89	82	26	54	2	54	312	430	–	4th, West	Did not qualify
1989–90	82	53	21	8	114	315	237	–	1st, West	Turner Cup Champion
1990–91	82	48	29	5	101	342	264	–	2nd, West	Lost in Round 1
1991–92	82	31	41	10	72	272	329	–	5th, East	Did not qualify
1992–93	82	34	39	9	77	324	347	2155	2nd, Central	Lost in Round 1
1993–94	81	28	46	7	63	257	329	2170	3rd, Central	Did not qualify
1994–95	81	32	41	8	72	273	330	1490	6th, Midwest	Did not qualify
1995–96	82	43	33	6	92	304	295	1699	2nd, North	Lost in Round 1
1996–97	82	44	29	9	97	289	230	2388	1st, Central	Lost in Round 1
1997–98	80	40	36	6	86	245	261	1947	3rd, Central	Lost in Round 1
1998–99	81	33	37	12	78	243	277	1946	3rd, Central	Lost in quarterfinal

=== CHL Ice ===
Season	GP	W	L	OTL	Pts	GF	GA	PIM	Finish	Playoffs
1999–00	70	39	28	3	81	290	244	1491	2nd, West	Miron Cup Champion
2000–01	70	31	32	7	69	239	260	1912	4th, East	Lost in Round 1
2001–02	64	20	37	7	47	192	237	2119	4th, Northeast	Did not qualify
2002–03	64	39	16	9	87	206	173	1192	1st, Northeast	Lost in Conference Final
2003–04	64	37	23	4	78	202	181	1237	2nd, Northeast	Lost in Round 1
