= Topeka Tarantulas =

Former professional minor league ice hockey team in Topeka, Kansas

The Topeka Tarantulas were a professional minor league ice hockey team based in Topeka, Kansas. They were a member of the Central Hockey League and played their home games at Landon Arena. The team was established in 2004 when the Indianapolis Ice moved to Topeka from Indianapolis. The Tarantulas played one season and then folded.

The Tarantulas were preceded by the Topeka Scarecrows, who played in the CHL from 1998 to 2001; another franchise also named the Topeka Scarecrows subsequently played in the United States Hockey League from 2001 to 2003. The Tarantulas went 16-39-0-2-3 (W-L-T-OTL-SOL) in their only season and then folded in 2005. Topeka was without hockey at any level until 2007 when the Topeka RoadRunners began play in the Tier II junior North American Hockey League. The RoadRunners moved to Kansas City in 2020.
