= Jason Fitzsimmons =

Canadian retired ice hockey goaltender

- Born: June 3, 1971 (age 54) Regina, Saskatchewan, Canada
- Height: 5 ft 11 in (180 cm)
- Weight: 185 lb (84 kg; 13 st 3 lb)
- Position: Goaltender
- Caught: Right
- Played for: AHL; Cape Breton Oilers; Hamilton Canucks; Rochester Americans; Syracuse Crunch; ECHL; Columbus Chill; South Carolina Stingrays
- NHL draft: 227th overall, 1991; Vancouver Canucks
- Playing career: 1992–1998

Jason Fitzsimmons (born June 3, 1971) is a Canadian former professional ice hockey goaltender, who played six seasons in the ECHL and AHL, most notably for the South Carolina Stingrays. He is currently a professional scout for the Washington Capitals of the National Hockey League.

== Playing career ==
Drafted from the Moose Jaw Warriors of the Western Hockey League in the 11th round of the 1991 NHL entry draft by the Vancouver Canucks, Fitzsimmons made his professional debut with the Hamilton Canucks of the American Hockey League in the 1992-93 season. He also appeared in the AHL with the Cape Breton Oilers, Syracuse Crunch and Rochester Americans.

Fitzsimmons suited up with the Columbus Chill, but found most of his professional success as a goaltender with the South Carolina Stingrays of the ECHL. Fitzsimmons was named the Most Valuable Player of the 1997 ECHL Playoffs, backstopping South Carolina to the 1997 Kelly Cup Championship.

Fitzsimmons is also a member of the Hall of Fame for the Moose Jaw Warriors and South Carolina Stingrays.

== Coaching career ==
Starting with the 1998-99 season, Fitzsimmons was the assistant coach of the South Carolina Stingrays. Following the 2001-02 season, he was promoted to head coach. The 'Rays saw much regular season success under Fitzsimmons' coaching, seeing 188 wins in the five seasons he was coach. However, the Stingrays didn't advance past the second round of the playoffs, and didn't qualify for the playoffs in his final season as coach.

At the end of the 2006-07 season, Fitzsimmons stepped down as head coach, and assistant coach and former Stingray Jared Bednar became the head coach. He has since become a scout for the Stingrays' NHL affiliate, the Washington Capitals.

Preceded by Rick Adduono	South Carolina Stingrays head coach 2002–07	Succeeded by Jared Bednar
