= 1993–94 ECHL season =

Ice hockey league season

The 1993–94 ECHL season was the sixth season of the ECHL. In 1993, the league saw the Roanoke Valley Rampage move to Huntsville, AL becoming the Huntsville Blast, as well as an expansion to three new markets: Charlotte, NC, North Charleston, SC, and Huntington, WV and returned to the Roanoke Valley with the Roanoke Express. The 19 teams played 68 games in the schedule. The Knoxville Cherokees finished first overall in the regular season. The Toledo Storm won their second straight Riley Cup Championship.

== League realignment ==
The league announced a realignment of the league by adding a third division.

=== East Division ===
- Charlotte Checkers
- Greensboro Monarchs
- Hampton Roads Admirals
- Raleigh Icecaps
- Richmond Renegades
- Roanoke Express
- South Carolina Stingrays

=== North Division ===
- Columbus Chill
- Dayton Bombers
- Erie Panthers
- Johnstown Chiefs
- Toledo Storm
- Wheeling Thunderbirds

=== West Division ===
- Birmingham Bulls
- Huntington Blizzard
- Huntsville Blast
- Knoxville Cherokees
- Louisville Icehawks
- Nashville Knights

== Regular season ==
Note: GP = Games played, W = Wins, L = Losses, T = Ties, Pts = Points, GF = Goals for, GA = Goals against, Green shade = Clinched playoff spot, Blue shade = Clinched division

East Division	GP	W	L	OTL	Pts	GF	GA
Hampton Roads Admirals	68	41	19	8	90	298	246
Raleigh Icecaps	68	41	20	7	89	296	221
Greensboro Monarchs	68	41	21	6	88	319	262
Charlotte Checkers	68	39	25	4	82	281	271
Roanoke Express	68	37	28	3	77	300	290
South Carolina Stingrays	68	33	26	9	75	294	291
Richmond Renegades	68	34	29	5	73	286	293

North Division	GP	W	L	OTL	Pts	GF	GA
Toledo Storm	68	44	20	4	92	338	289
Columbus Chill	68	41	20	7	89	344	285
Wheeling Thunderbirds	68	38	23	7	83	327	289
Johnstown Chiefs	68	37	27	4	78	323	308
Dayton Bombers	68	29	31	8	66	316	308
Erie Panthers	68	27	36	5	59	264	334

West Division	GP	W	L	OTL	Pts	GF	GA
Knoxville Cherokees	68	44	18	6	94	325	246
Birmingham Bulls	68	44	20	4	92	340	268
Nashville Knights	68	26	36	6	58	255	289
Huntsville Blast	68	20	39	9	49	241	315
Louisville Icehawks	68	16	44	8	40	236	356
Huntington Blizzard	68	14	49	5	33	191	413

== Riley Cup playoffs ==
=== Bracket ===
First round
N.1	Toledo	2
N.5	Dayton	1
N.2	Columbus	2
N.4	Johnstown	1
N.3	Wheeling	2
W.3	Nashville	0
E.1	Hampton Roads	2
E.6	South Carolina	1
W.1	Knoxville	1
W.5	Louisville	2
W.2	Birmingham	2
W.4	Huntsville	1
E.2	Raleigh	2
E.5	Roanoke	0
E.3	Greensboro	2
E.4	Charlotte	1

Regional semifinals
N.1	Toledo	3
N.2	Columbus	0
N.3	Wheeling	3
E.1	Hampton Roads	1
W.5	Louisville	0
W.2	Birmingham	3
E.2	Raleigh	3
E.3	Greensboro	2

Regional finals
N.1	Toledo	3
N.3	Wheeling	0
W.2	Birmingham	1
E.2	Raleigh	3

Riley Cup
N.1	Toledo	4
E.2	Raleigh	1

=== 1st round ===
Toledo vs. Dayton
Away	Home	
Dayton 3	Toledo 7	
Toledo 3	Dayton 4	
Dayton 3	Toledo 4	OT
Toledo wins series 2–1

Columbus vs. Johnstown
Away	Home
Columbus 1	Johnstown 2
Johnstown 4	Columbus 9
Johnstown 1	Columbus 4
Columbus wins series 2–1

Wheeling vs. Nashville
Away	Home
Wheeling 3	Nashville 2
Nashville 1	Wheeling 4
Wheeling wins series 2–0

Hampton Roads vs. South Carolina
Away	Home
Hampton Roads 3	South Carolina 6
South Carolina 0	Hampton Roads 4
South Carolina 2	Hampton Roads 7
Hampton Roads wins series 2–1

Knoxville vs. Louisville
Away	Home
Knoxville 0	Louisville 7
Louisville 2	Knoxville 8
Louisville 6	Knoxville 4
Louisville wins series 2–1

Birmingham vs. Huntsville
Away	Home
Huntsville 1	Birmingham 8
Birmingham 3	Huntsville 7
Huntsville 2	Birmingham 9
Birmingham wins series 2–1

Raleigh vs. Roanoke
Away	Home
Raleigh 5	Roanoke 2
Roanoke 2	Raleigh 7
Raleigh wins series 2–0

Greensboro vs. Charlotte
Away	Home	
Charlotte 4	Greensboro 5	OT
Greensboro 2	Charlotte 3	
Charlotte 3	Greensboro 5	
Greensboro wins series 2–1

=== 2nd round ===
Toledo vs. Columbus
Away	Home
Columbus 2	Toledo 7
Toledo 8	Columbus 3
Columbus 4	Toledo 6
Toledo wins series 3–0

Wheeling vs. Hampton Roads
Away	Home	
Wheeling 5	Hampton Roads 4	OT
Wheeling 1	Hampton Roads 3	
Hampton Roads 5	Wheeling 6	
Hampton Roads 1	Wheeling 5	
Wheeling wins series 3–1

Louisville vs. Birmingham
Away	Home
Louisville 2	Birmingham 5
Louisville 2	Birmingham 8
Birmingham 3	Louisville 2
Birmingham wins series 3–0

Raleigh vs. Greensboro
Away	Home
Greensboro 4	Raleigh 3
Greensboro 4	Raleigh 3
Raleigh 4	Greensboro 1
Raleigh 3	Greensboro 1
Greensboro 1	Raleigh 3
Raleigh wins series 3–2

=== Semifinals ===
Toledo vs. Wheeling
Away	Home
Wheeling 1	Toledo 5
Toledo 6	Wheeling 2
Wheeling 2	Toledo 5
Toledo wins Series 3–0

Raleigh vs. Birmingham
Away	Home
Raleigh 3	Birmingham 1
Raleigh 1	Birmingham 7
Birmingham 5	Raleigh 7
Birmingham 6	Raleigh 7
Raleigh wins Series 3–1

=== Riley Cup finals ===
Toledo vs. Raleigh
Away	Home	
Raleigh 3	Toledo 4	OT
Raleigh 3	Toledo 4	OT
Toledo 2	Raleigh 3	OT
Toledo 7	Raleigh 2	
Toledo 7	Raleigh 6	
Toledo wins Series and Riley Cup 4–1

== ECHL awards ==
Jack Riley Cup:	Toledo Storm
Henry Brabham Cup:	Knoxville Cherokees
John Brophy Award:	Barry Smith (Knoxville)
ECHL Most Valuable Player:	Joe Flanagan (Birmingham)
Riley Cup Playoffs Most Valuable Player:	Dave Gagnon (Toledo)
ECHL Goaltender of the Year:	Cory Cadden (Knoxville)
ECHL Rookie of the Year:	Dan Gravelle (Greensboro)
Defenseman of the Year:	Tom Nemeth (Dayton)
Leading Scorer:	Phil Berger (Greensboro)

== See also ==
- ECHL All-Star Game
- Kelly Cup
- List of ECHL seasons
- 1993 in sports
- 1994 in sports
