= 1996–97 ECHL season =

Ice hockey league season

The 1996–97 ECHL season was the ninth season of the ECHL. Before the start of the season, two franchises relocated, one was renamed, and two expansion franchises were founded. Founding member Erie Panthers moved to Baton Rouge, LA and the Nashville Knights moved to Pensacola, FL, the Wheeling Thunderbirds changed their name to the Wheeling Nailers following a lawsuit with WHL's Seattle Thunderbirds, and the ECHL welcomed franchises in Peoria, IL and Biloxi, MS.

In 1996, the ECHL Board of Governors decided to retire the Jack Riley Cup and create a new trophy, the Patrick J. Kelly Cup, named after founding father and former ECHL commissioner, Patrick J. Kelly. The league also created a new individual award, the Sportsmanship Award, to be awarded to the player adjudged to have exhibited the best type of sportsmanship and gentlemanly conduct combined with a high standard of playing ability as voted by the coaches of each of the ECHL teams.

The South Carolina Stingrays finished first overall in the season and became the first team in ECHL history to win the Brabham and Kelly Cups in the same year as they defeated the Louisiana IceGators 4 games to 1.

== Regular season ==
=== Final standings ===
Note: GP = Games played, W = Wins, L = Losses, T = Ties, Pts = Points, GF = Goals for, GA = Goals against, Green shade = Clinched playoff spot, Blue shade = Clinched division

East Division	GP	W	L	T	Pts	GF	GA
South Carolina Stingrays	70	45	15	10	100	345	253
Hampton Roads Admirals	70	46	19	5	97	286	223
Richmond Renegades	70	41	25	4	86	252	235
Roanoke Express	70	38	26	6	82	262	250
Charlotte Checkers	70	35	28	7	77	271	267
Raleigh Icecaps	70	30	33	7	67	256	293
Knoxville Cherokees	70	24	43	3	51	260	343

North Division	GP	W	L	T	Pts	GF	GA
Columbus Chill	70	44	21	5	93	303	257
Peoria Rivermen	70	43	21	6	92	308	219
Dayton Bombers	70	36	26	8	80	253	258
Wheeling Nailers	70	36	29	5	77	298	291
Toledo Storm	70	32	28	10	74	258	248
Huntington Blizzard	70	33	33	4	70	273	296
Louisville RiverFrogs	70	29	31	10	68	234	290
Johnstown Chiefs	70	24	39	7	55	253	354

South Division	GP	W	L	T	Pts	GF	GA
Tallahassee Tiger Sharks	70	39	23	8	86	263	236
Birmingham Bulls	70	36	25	9	81	291	296
Louisiana IceGators	70	38	28	4	80	292	244
Mobile Mysticks	70	34	25	11	79	257	263
Mississippi Sea Wolves	70	34	26	10	78	241	245
Pensacola Ice Pilots	70	36	31	3	75	275	275
Baton Rouge Kingfish	70	31	33	6	68	222	238
Jacksonville Lizard Kings	70	21	37	12	54	220	299

== Kelly Cup playoffs ==
=== Bracket ===
First Round (Best of 5)
South Carolina	3
Charlotte	0
Hampton Roads	3
Roanoke	1
Richmond	3
Dayton	1
Tallahassee	0
Pensacola	3
Columbus	3
Toledo	2
Peoria	3
Wheeling	0
Birmingham	3
Mississippi	0
Louisiana	3
Mobile	0

Quarterfinals (Best of 5)
South Carolina	3
Hampton Roads	0
Richmond	1
Pensacola	3
Columbus	0
Peoria	3
Birmingham	2
Louisiana	3

Semifinals (Best of 5)
South Carolina	3
Pensacola	2
Peoria	1
Louisiana	3

Finals (Best of 7)
South Carolina	4
Louisiana	1

=== First round ===
South Carolina vs. Charlotte
Date	Away	Home
April 2	Charlotte 2	S. Carolina 4
April 4	Charlotte 3	S. Carolina 5
April 5	S. Carolina 4	Charlotte 2
South Carolina wins series 3–0

Hampton Roads vs. Roanoke
Date	Away	Home	
April 2	Roanoke 3	Hampton Roads 4	OT
April 4	Roanoke 4	Hampton Roads 2	
April 5	Hampton Roads 4	Roanoke 1	
April 6	Hampton Roads 4	Roanoke 3	
Hampton Roads wins series 3–1

Richmond vs. Dayton
Date	Away	Home
April 1	Dayton 3	Richmond 5
April 3	Dayton 3	Richmond 4
April 5	Richmond 1	Dayton 4
April 6	Richmond 5	Dayton 2
Richmond wins series 3–1

Tallahassee vs. Pensacola
Date	Away	Home	
April 2	Pensacola 4	Tallahassee 2	
April 4	Pensacola 4	Tallahassee 0	
April 5	Tallahassee 3	Pensacola 4	OT
Pensacola wins series 3–0

Columbus vs. Toledo
Date	Away	Home	
April 2	Toledo 2	Columbus 5	
April 4	Columbus 2	Toledo 3	OT
April 5	Toledo 3	Columbus 2	OT
April 6	Columbus 3	Toledo 2	OT
April 9	Toledo 2	Columbus 5	
Columbus wins series 3–2

Peoria vs. Wheeling
Date	Away	Home
April 1	Wheeling 5	Peoria 6
April 2	Wheeling 4	Peoria 9
April 4	Peoria 8	Wheeling 3
Peoria wins series 3–0

Birmingham vs. Mississippi
Date	Away	Home	
April 1	Mississippi 3	Birmingham 6	
April 4	Mississippi 3	Birmingham 4	
April 5	Birmingham 4	Mississippi 3	OT
Birmingham wins series 3–0

Louisiana vs. Mobile
Date	Away	Home
April 2	Mobile 2	Louisiana 4
April 4	Louisiana 3	Mobile 2
April 6	Mobile 4	Louisiana 5
Louisiana wins series 3–0

=== Quarterfinals ===
South Carolina vs. Hampton Roads
Date	Away	Home	
April 11	Hampton Roads 4	South Carolina 5	OT
April 12	Hampton Roads 5	South Carolina 6	OT
April 17	South Carolina 3	Hampton Roads 8	
April 19	South Carolina 4	Hampton Roads 5	
April 20	Hampton Roads 2	South Carolina 6	
South Carolina wins series 3–2

Richmond vs. Pensacola
Date	Away	Home
April 11	Pensacola 4	Richmond 2
April 12	Pensacola 3	Richmond 6
April 17	Richmond 3	Pensacola 4
April 18	Richmond 4	Pensacola 8
Pensacola wins series 3–1

Columbus vs. Peoria
Date	Away	Home
April 2	Columbus 2	Peoria 5
April 4	Peoria 3	Columbus 2
April 6	Peoria 5	Columbus 2
Peoria wins series 3–0

Birmingham vs. Louisiana
Date	Away	Home	
April 11	Louisiana 4	Birmingham 3	
April 13	Louisiana 4	Birmingham 5	
April 15	Birmingham 4	Louisiana 5	
April 16	Birmingham 6	Louisiana 5	
April 19	Louisiana 6	Birmingham 5	OT
Louisiana wins series 3–2

=== Semifinals ===
South Carolina vs. Pensacola
Date	Away	Home	
April 24	Pensacola 6	South Carolina 5	OT
April 25	Pensacola 2	South Carolina 4	
April 17	South Carolina 6	Pensacola 5	OT
April 19	South Carolina 3	Pensacola 4	
April 30	Pensacola 1	South Carolina 6	
South Carolina wins series 3–2

Peoria vs. Louisiana
Date	Away	Home	
April 24	Louisiana 4	Peoria 3	OT
April 26	Louisiana 4	Peoria 2	
April 28	Peoria 10	Louisiana 3	
April 29	Peoria 3	Louisiana 4	OT
Louisiana wins series 3–1

=== Kelly Cup finals ===
Kelly Cup Finals South Carolina vs. Louisiana
Date	Away	Home
May 2	Louisiana 1	South Carolina 6
May 4	Louisiana 2	South Carolina 4
May 7	South Carolina 4	Louisiana 5
May 9	South Carolina 7	Louisiana 4
May 11	South Carolina 6	Louisiana 4
South Carolina wins series 4–1

== ECHL awards ==
Patrick J. Kelly Cup:	South Carolina Stingrays
Henry Brabham Cup:	South Carolina Stingrays
John Brophy Award:	Brian McCutcheon (Columbus)
ECHL Most Valuable Player:	Mike Ross (South Carolina)
Kelly Cup Playoffs Most Valuable Player:	Jason Fitzsimmons (South Carolina)
ECHL Goaltender of the Year:	Marc Delorme (Louisiana)
ECHL Rookie of the Year:	Dany Bousquet (Birmingham)
Defenseman of the Year:	Chris Valicevic (Louisiana)
Leading Scorer:	Ed Courtenay (South Carolina)
Sportsmanship Award:	Mike Ross (South Carolina)

== See also ==
- ECHL All-Star Game
- List of ECHL seasons
- 1996 in sports
- 1997 in sports
