= 2009 Spengler Cup =

Invitational ice hockey tournament held in 2009 in Davos, Switzerland

2009 Spengler Cup Davos, Switzerland
Tournament details
- Host country: Switzerland
- Venue(s): Vaillant Arena, Davos
- Dates: 26 – 31 December 2009
- Teams: 5

Final positions
- Champions: (Belarus) HC Dinamo Minsk (1st title)
- Runners-up: (Switzerland) HC Davos

Tournament statistics
- Games played: 11
- Goals scored: 66 (6 per game)
- Attendance: 64,825 (5,893 per game)
- Scoring leader: Sergei Varlamov (9 pts)

The 2009 Spengler Cup was held in Davos, Switzerland, from December 26 to December 31, 2009. All matches were played at host HC Davos' home Vaillant Arena. The tournament featured all of the last year's tournament participants except for last year's winners Dynamo Moscow who was replaced by HC Dinamo Minsk and ERC Ingolstadt who was replaced by Adler Mannheim.

== Teams participating ==
- Team Canada
- (Switzerland) HC Davos (host)
- (Germany) Adler Mannheim
- (Czech Republic) HC Energie Karlovy Vary
- (Belarus) HC Dinamo Minsk

== Tournament ==
=== Round-robin results ===
Team	Pld	W	OTW	OTL	L	GF	GA	GD	Pts
(Belarus) HC Dinamo Minsk	4	3	0	0	1	16	7	+9	6
(Switzerland) HC Davos	4	3	0	0	1	13	12	+1	6
Team Canada	4	1	1	0	2	18	17	+1	4
(Germany) Adler Mannheim	4	1	1	0	2	9	8	+1	4
(Czech Republic) HC Energie Karlovy Vary	4	0	0	2	2	10	22	−12	2

All times local (CET/UTC +1)

December 26, 2009; 15:00	(Belarus) HC Dinamo Minsk	2–3 (1–1, 1–1, 0–1)	(Switzerland) HC Davos	Vaillant Arena

Game reference

	0 – 1	1 – Von Arx
Varlamov – 11	1 – 1
Jokela – 25	2 – 1
	2 – 2	37 – Von Arx
	2 – 3	57 – Naumenko

December 26, 2009; 20:15	Team Canada	7–6 (SO) (1–1, 3–4, 2–1, 0–0, 1/2-0/3)	(Czech Republic) HC Energie Karlovy Vary	Vaillant Arena

Game reference

	0 – 1	17 – Dobron
Siklenka – 19	1 – 1
	1 – 2	26 – Kristek
Heins – 28	2 – 2
Roche – 36	3 – 2
	3 – 3	37 – Kristek
McLean – 38	4 – 3
	4 – 4	39 – Zyuzin
	4 – 5	40 – Pech
Bell – 41	5 – 5
Daigle – 50	6 – 5
	6 – 6	53 – Košťál

(miss) Robitaille
Aubin
Shootout
(miss) Pálffy
(miss) Kristek
(miss) Pech

December 27, 2009; 15:00	(Switzerland) HC Davos	5–3 (1–1, 2–1, 2–1)	(Czech Republic) HC Energie Karlovy Vary	Vaillant Arena

Game reference

	0 – 1	9 – Skuhravý
Kolník – 20	1 – 1
Kolník – 28	2 – 1
Wieser – 29	3 – 1
	3 – 2	40 – Kumstát
Duca – 47	4 – 2
	4 – 3	52 – Kristek
Kolník – 58	5 – 3

December 27, 2009; 20:15	(Germany) Adler Mannheim	1–2 (0–0, 0–1, 1–1)	(Belarus) HC Dinamo Minsk	Vaillant Arena

Game reference

	0 – 1	32 – Varlamov
Arendt – 47	1 – 1
	1 – 2	49 – Kovyrshin

December 28, 2009; 15:00	(Czech Republic) HC Energie Karlovy Vary	1–2 (SO) (1–0, 0–0, 0–1, 0–0, 1/5-2/4)	(Germany) Adler Mannheim	Vaillant Arena

Game reference
Pálffy – 12 / 1 – 0; / 1 – 1 / 60 – Scalzo
Pletka (miss); Němec; Košťál (miss); Melenovský (miss); Němec (miss)	Shootout	King; (miss) Urguhart; (miss) Spylo; Papineau

December 28, 2009; 20:15	Team Canada	6–2 (2–0, 3–2, 1–0)	(Switzerland) HC Davos	Vaillant Arena

Game reference

Vigier – 15	1 – 0
Bell – 19	2 – 0
Bell – 28	3 – 0
Tremblay – 32	4 – 0
	4 – 1	33 – Naumenko
Daigle – 34	5 – 1
	5 – 2	37 – Setzinger
Trudel – 49	6 – 2

December 29, 2009; 15:00	(Germany) Adler Mannheim	5–2 (1–0, 4–2, 0–0)	Team Canada	Vaillant Arena

Game reference

Méthot – 20	1 – 0
	1 – 1	Trudel 21
Spylo – 22	2 – 1
Spylo – 24	3 – 1
Spylo – 30	4 – 1
Steiner – 34	5 – 1
	5 – 2	Heins 37

December 29, 2009; 20:15	(Czech Republic) HC Energie Karlovy Vary	0–8 (0–4, 0–3, 0–1)	(Belarus) HC Dinamo Minsk	Vaillant Arena

Game reference

0 – 1	2 – Meleshko
0 – 2	2 – Chupris
0 – 3	3 – Hyvönen
0 – 4	4 – Meleshko
0 – 5	23 – Westcott
0 – 6	25 – Hyvönen
0 – 7	29 – Antonov
0 – 8	42 – Kulakov

December 30, 2009; 15:00	(Belarus) HC Dinamo Minsk	4–3 (1–1, 2–1, 1–1)	Team Canada	Vaillant Arena

Game reference

Jokela – 9	1 – 0
	1 – 1	12 – McLean
Kochetkov – 23	2 – 1
Kochetov – 32	3 – 1
	3 – 2	35 – Heins
Chupris – 42	4 – 2
	4 – 3	52 – Vigier

December 30, 2009; 20:15	(Switzerland) HC Davos	3–1 (1–1, 2–0, 0–0)	(Germany) Adler Mannheim	Vaillant Arena

Game reference

	0 – 1	3 – Spylo
Bürgler – 8	1 – 1
Salmonsson – 25	2 – 1
Kolník – 35	3 – 1

=== Final ===
All times are local (UTC+1).

December 31, 2009; 12:00	HC Davos (Switzerland)	1–3 (0–1, 0–1, 1–1)	(Belarus) HC Dinamo Minsk	Vaillant Arena; Attendance: 6,746

Game reference

Referees:
(Russia) Vyacheslav Bulanov
(Switzerland) Danny Kurmann

	0 – 1	Kulakov 10
	0 – 2	Kochetkov 25 (PP1)
Kolník 41 (PP1)	1 – 2
	1 – 3	Meleshko 60 (ENG)

== Champions ==
2009 Spengler Cup winners

First title

== All-Star Team ==
Position	Player	Nationality	Team
Goaltender	Andrei Mezin	(Belarus) Belarusian	(Belarus) HC Dinamo Minsk
Right defender	Duvie Westcott	(Canada) Canadian	(Belarus) HC Dinamo Minsk
Left defender	Shawn Heins	(Canada) Canadian	Team Canada
Right wing	Ahren Spylo	(Canada) Canadian	(Germany) Adler Mannheim
Center	Sergei Varlamov	(Ukraine) Ukrainian	(Belarus) HC Dinamo Minsk
Left wing	Juraj Kolník	(Slovakia) Slovak	(Switzerland) HC Davos

== Statistics ==
=== Scoring leaders ===
Player	Team	GP	G	A	Pts
(Ukraine) Sergei Varlamov	HC Dinamo Minsk	4	2	7	9
(Russia) Denis Kochetkov	HC Dinamo Minsk	4	3	3	6
(Belarus) Yaroslav Chupris	HC Dinamo Minsk	4	2	4	6
(Canada) J. P. Vigier	Team Canada	4	2	3	5
(Slovakia) Juraj Kolník	HC Davos	4	5	0	5

G = Goals; A = Assists; Pts = Points

== Television ==
Several television channels around the world will cover many or all matches of the Spengler Cup. As well as most Swiss channels, here is a listing of who else will cover the tournament:

- Schweizer Fernsehen (Switzerland, host broadcaster)
- The Sports Network (Canada)
- Eurosport 2, British Eurosport, Eurosport Asia and Pacific, and Eurosport HD
- Nova Sport (Czech Republic, Slovakia)
