= Albany Devils =

Former American ice hockey team

- City: Albany, New York
- League: American Hockey League
- Founded: 1998
- Operated: 2010–2017
- Home arena: Times Union Center
- Colors: Red, black, white
- Owner: Harris Blitzer Sports & Entertainment
- Media: Albany Times Union; MSG Network; ESPN 104.5 The Team
- Affiliates: New Jersey Devils (NHL)

Franchise history
- 1998–2006: Lowell Lock Monsters
- 2006–2010: Lowell Devils
- 2010–2017: Albany Devils
- 2017–2021: Binghamton Devils
- 2021–present: Utica Comets

The Albany Devils were a professional ice hockey team in the American Hockey League (AHL). The top affiliate of the New Jersey Devils of the National Hockey League (NHL), they played their home games at the Times Union Center in Albany, New York.

The franchise started in 1998 as the expansion Lowell Lock Monsters and played their home games in Lowell, Massachusetts. In 2006, the Devils purchased the Lock Monsters and rebranded the franchise as the Lowell Devils for the 2006–07 AHL season. Citing low attendance, the franchise was moved to Albany in 2010 and began play as the Albany Devils. This would mark the second time the New Jersey Devils have been affiliated with an AHL team in Albany; from 1993 to 2006, the Devils used the Albany River Rats as their top minor league team.

Ahead of the 2017–18 AHL season, the Devils moved to Binghamton, New York, and became the Binghamton Devils.

== History ==
On February 10, 2010, Albany River Rats owner Walter L. Robb sold his team to MAK Hockey LLC, led by Charlotte beer distributor Michael Kahn, owner of the Charlotte Checkers of the ECHL. It was then announced that the River Rats would play the 2010–11 season as the Charlotte Checkers, and the ECHL franchise was relinquished to the league. Meanwhile, Robb, as well as members of the River Rats and Times Union Center's front office, had already begun looking for an American Hockey League team to replace the River Rats.

On April 26, 2010, the New Jersey Devils sent Albany County a letter of intent to move their AHL affiliate to Albany, with a five-year commitment, if the county government would make specific changes to its arena. New Jersey Devils General Manager Lou Lamoriello, in a letter to the members of the Lowell Devils Booster Club, stated that changes presented in the lease with Lowell made it "financially impossible" to stay.

On May 10, 2010, the county legislature voted 35–2 to spend $1.6 million to replace the scoreboard, add ribbon board advertising, and improve exterior lighting.

On June 10, 2010, the New Jersey Devils announced that they were moving the Lowell Devils to the Times Union Center in Albany beginning with the 2010–11 AHL season to play as the Albany Devils. All but four of their 40 home games would be played in Albany, with the others played in Atlantic City, New Jersey, at Boardwalk Hall. Soon after that, the New Jersey Devils announced they had promoted John MacLean to fill their head coaching vacancy. MacLean had been the head coach of the Lowell Devils during the 2009–10 season. In August, Rick Kowalsky was named head coach of the Albany team, with former New Jersey Devils defenseman Tommy Albelin being named the assistant coach.

On January 13, 2016, the Devils won their 11th consecutive home win to set a new franchise record. On April 1, 2016, the Devils broke the franchise's previous wins record, set in 2013–14, with their 41st win: an overtime victory over the Binghamton Senators.

On April 4, 2016, the Times Union Center and its managing group SMG announced they had reached an agreement with the New Jersey Devils to extend the lease of its AHL affiliate through the 2018–19 season. However, on January 25, 2017, it was reported that the Albany Devils would move to replace the departing Binghamton Senators in Binghamton, New York, in the 2017–18 season. The Binghamton Devils were announced on January 31. At the time of the announcement, the Albany Devils were drawing the lowest average attendance in the league.

== Season-by-season results ==
Calder Cup champions	Conference champions	Division champions	League Leader

Records as of the end of the 2016–17 AHL season.

Regular season											Playoffs				
Season	Games	Won	Lost	OTL	SOL	Points	PCT	Goals for	Goals against	Standing	Year	1st round	2nd round	3rd round	Finals
2010–11	80	32	42	1	5	70	.438	217	283	8th, East	2011	Did not qualify			
2011–12	76	31	34	6	5	73	.480	190	226	5th, Northeast	2012	Did not qualify			
2012–13	76	31	32	1	12	75	.493	193	225	4th, Northeast	2013	Did not qualify			
2013–14	76	40	23	5	8	93	.612	220	193	2nd, Northeast	2014	L, 1–3, STJ	—	—	—
2014–15	76	37	28	5	6	85	.559	199	201	4th, Northeast	2015	Did not qualify			
2015–16	76	46	20	8	2	102	.671	212	167	2nd, North	2016	W, 3–1, UTI	L, 3–4, TOR	—	—
2016–17	76	39	32	2	3	83	.546	204	206	3rd, North	2017	L, 1–3, TOR	—	—	—
Totals	536	256	211	28	41	581	.542	1435	1501			3 Playoff Appearances			

== Players ==
=== Team captains ===
- Stephen Gionta, 2010–2012
- Jay Leach, 2012–2013
- Rod Pelley, 2013–2017
