= Kostal =

Kostal may refer to:

- Košťál, a Czech surname
- Kostal Cone, a hill in Canada
- Kostal Lake, a lake in Canada

== See also ==
- Kostal UK Ltd v Dunkley, United Kingdom legal case about trade union membership
