= 2012–13 Belarusian Cup (ice hockey) =

The 2012–13 Belarusian Cup was contested by 10 teams, divided into two groups. The top team from each group qualified for the final, where HK Gomel defeated Metallurg Zhlobin to win the cup. The tournament took place from August 13 to September 1, 2012.

== First round ==
=== Group I ===
	Club	GP	W	OTW	OTL	L	Goals	Pts
1.	Metallurg Zhlobin	4	3	1	0	0	25:4	11
2.	Yunost Minsk	4	2	1	0	1	16:11	8
3.	Shakhtar Soligorsk	4	2	0	2	0	12:7	8
4.	Khimik-SKA Novopolotsk	4	1	0	0	3	6:19	3
5.	HK Vitebsk	4	0	0	0	4	1:19	0

=== Group II ===
	Club	GP	W	OTW	OTL	L	Goals	Pts
1.	HK Gomel	4	3	1	0	0	27:8	11
2.	HK Neman Grodno	4	2	0	1	1	15:9	7
3.	HK Brest	4	2	0	0	2	15:19	6
4.	HK Lida	4	2	0	0	2	14:19	6
5.	HK Mogilev	4	0	0	0	4	4:20	0

== Final ==
- Metallurg Zhlobin - HK Gomel 2:3 (0:1, 2:2, 0:0)
