= Shawn Heins =

Canadian ice hockey player

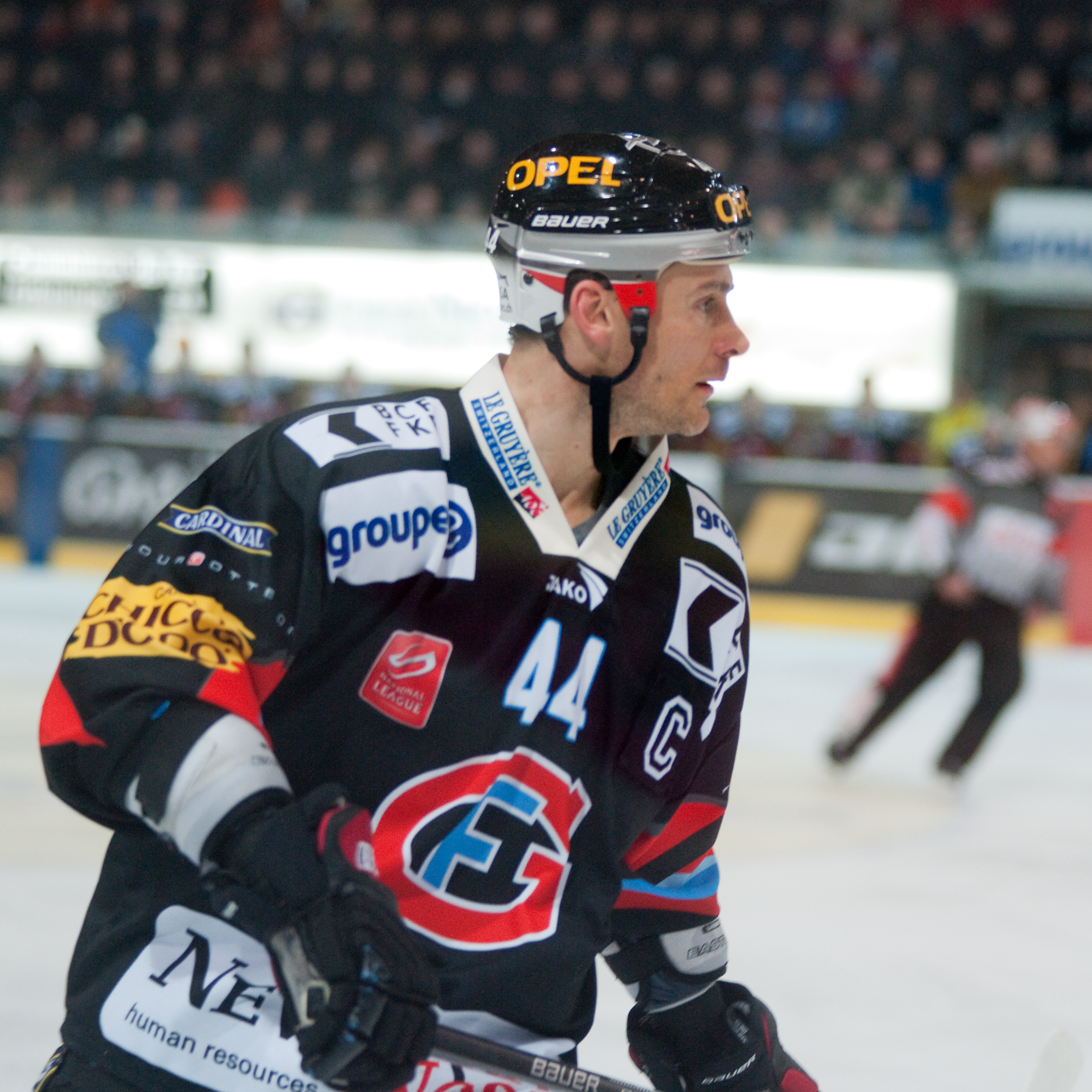
- Born: December 24, 1973 (age 52) Eganville, Ontario, Canada
- Height: 6 ft 4 in (193 cm)
- Weight: 210 lb (95 kg; 15 st 0 lb)
- Position: Defence
- Shot: Left
- Played for: San Jose Sharks; Pittsburgh Penguins; Atlanta Thrashers; Eisbären Berlin; Hannover Scorpions; EHC Basel; HC Fribourg-Gottéron
- NHL draft: Undrafted
- Playing career: 1995–2013

Shawn Joseph Heins (born December 24, 1973) is a Canadian former professional ice hockey defenceman. He played in the National Hockey League for the San Jose Sharks, Pittsburgh Penguins, and Atlanta Thrashers.

== Playing career ==
Heins was born in Eganville, Ontario. His style of play is that of an offensive defenceman and powerplay specialist. His slapshot, though not well known, has been measured at speeds well over 100 miles per hour. Heins held the record for the hardest recorded shot of all time with the puck going 106 miles per hour, until December 3, 2006. The record was surpassed by Chad Kilger of the Toronto Maple Leafs.

On several occasions, Heins has been a member of Team Canada at the Spengler Cup. In the final stages of the 2012–13 season with Fribourg, Heins suffered a concussion and was unable to re-sign with the club, still suffering post-concussion symptoms months later.

== Career statistics ==
=== Regular season and playoffs ===
			Regular Season					Playoffs
Season	Team	League	GP	G	A	Pts	PIM	GP	G	A	Pts	PIM
1991–92	Peterborough Petes	OHL	49	1	1	2	73	7	0	0	0	5
1992–93	Peterborough Petes	OHL	5	0	0	0	10	—	—	—	—	—
1992–93	Windsor Spitfires	OHL	53	7	10	17	107	—	—	—	—	—
1995–96	Cape Breton Oilers	AHL	1	0	0	0	0	—	—	—	—	—
1995–96	Mobile Mysticks	ECHL	62	7	20	27	152	—	—	—	—	—
1996–97	Kansas City Blades	IHL	6	0	0	0	9	—	—	—	—	—
1996–97	Mobile Mysticks	ECHL	56	6	17	23	253	3	0	2	2	2
1997–98	Kansas City Blades	IHL	82	22	28	50	303	11	1	0	1	49
1998–99	San Jose Sharks	NHL	5	0	0	0	13	—	—	—	—	—
1998–99	Kentucky Thoroughblades	AHL	18	2	2	4	108	12	2	7	9	10
1999–00	San Jose Sharks	NHL	1	0	0	0	2	—	—	—	—	—
1999–00	Kentucky Thoroughblades	AHL	69	11	52	63	238	9	3	3	6	44
2000–01	San Jose Sharks	NHL	38	3	4	7	57	2	0	0	0	0
2001–02	San Jose Sharks	NHL	17	0	2	2	24	—	—	—	—	—
2002–03	San Jose Sharks	NHL	20	0	1	1	9	—	—	—	—	—
2002–03	Pittsburgh Penguins	NHL	27	1	1	2	33	—	—	—	—	—
2003–04	Chicago Wolves	AHL	58	12	19	31	120	10	1	5	6	44
2003–04	Atlanta Thrashers	NHL	17	0	4	4	16	—	—	—	—	—
2004–05	Eisbären Berlin	DEL	49	6	21	27	142	11	3	4	7	24
2005–06	Hannover Scorpions	DEL	43	11	17	28	196	10	1	4	5	38
2006–07	EHC Basel	NLA	15	0	4	4	67	—	—	—	—	—
2006–07	HC Fribourg-Gottéron	NLA	26	6	13	19	127	—	—	—	—	—
2007–08	HC Fribourg-Gottéron	NLA	41	9	18	27	84	11	1	5	6	12
2008–09	HC Fribourg-Gottéron	NLA	47	11	20	31	174	10	0	1	1	31
2009–10	HC Fribourg-Gottéron	NLA	48	9	26	35	78	3	1	1	2	29
2010–11	HC Fribourg-Gottéron	NLA	50	6	21	27	121	4	1	2	3	4
2011–12	HC Fribourg-Gottéron	NLA	39	4	12	16	69	11	0	3	3	8
2012–13	HC Fribourg-Gottéron	NLA	36	1	8	9	52	14	1	2	3	32
NHL totals			125	4	12	16	154	2	0	0	0	0

=== International ===
Year	Team	Event	Result	GP	G	A	Pts	PIM
2006	Canada	Spengler Cup	2nd	5	0	3	3	4
2007	Canada	Spengler Cup	1st	5	0	1	1	6
2008	Canada	Spengler Cup	2nd	4	0	5	5	4
2011	Canada	Spengler Cup	—	3	0	2	2	4
2012	Gottéron	European Trophy	—	8	0	1	1	24
2012	Gottéron	Spengler Cup	—	4	0	0	0	8
Spengler Cup totals				21	0	11	11	26

== Awards and honors ==
- 1999–00 – AHL First All-Star team
- 2004–05 – DEL Champion
- 2006–07 – NLA Most Penalized Player (127)
- 2008–09 – NLA Most Penalized Player (174)
- 2009 – Spengler Cup All-Star Team
