= Sean Connolly =

Irish republican, socialist and actor

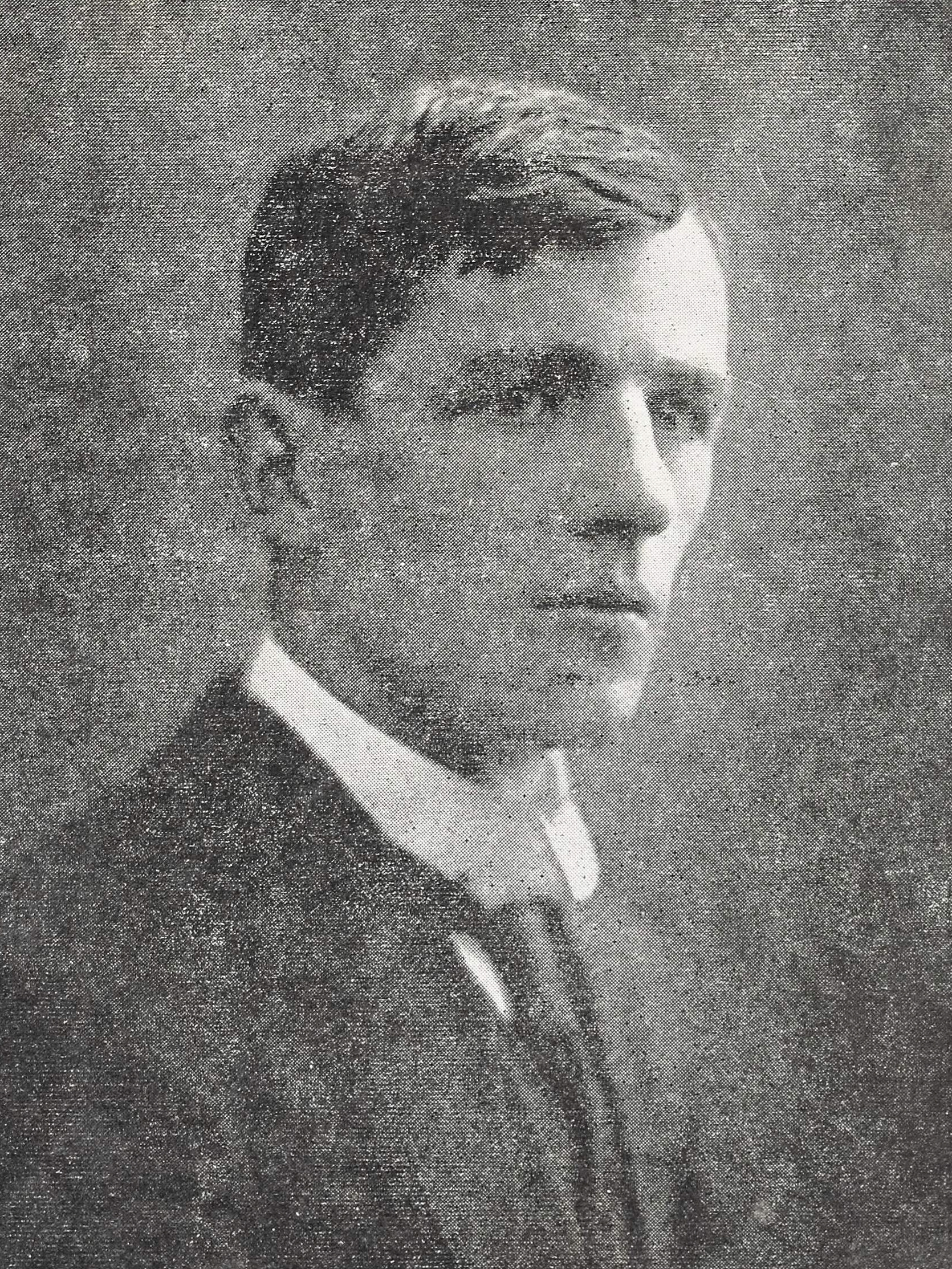
- Born: 12 April 1882; Sandymount, Dublin, Ireland
- Died: 24 April 1916 (aged 34); City Hall, Dublin, Ireland
- Military career
- Allegiance: Irish Republic
- Branch: Irish Citizen Army
- Service years: 1913–16
- Rank: Captain
- Conflicts: Easter Rising

Sean Connolly (Irish: Seán Ó Congaile) was an Irish republican, socialist and Abbey Theatre actor who took part in the Easter Rising. He was a captain in the Irish Citizen Army and was the first rebel to be killed during the Rising.

== Early life and family ==
Connolly was born in Sandymount, Dublin in 1882. His father Michael led the Fenians to the battleground at Tallaght during the Fenian Rising in 1867, at the age of 11. He was also involved in the ITGWU. He attended St. Joseph's Secondary C.B.S. in Fairview.

== Easter Rising ==
On Easter Monday morning when the ICA was about to start the Rising and march towards their positions from Liberty Hall, James Connolly (no relation) approached Sean Connolly, told him how much time he had to get to Dublin Castle, shook his hand and said "Good luck Sean! We won't meet again". At 11:45am that same day he led a group of ICA members including his brother Matthew and his sister Kate towards Dublin Castle. At the main gate of the castle DMP officer James O'Brien, who was attempting to close the gate, was shot dead. Accounts vary as to whether Sean Connolly or another fighter shot him. They then tied up six sentries in the castle guard room. British Army major AJ Price, who had heard shots fired, ran out to the castle courtyard and fired at Connolly and the other ICA members before retreating. Connolly and those under his command retreated to City Hall. Within an hour of the retreat he was shot dead on the roof of City Hall by a British sniper. Kathleen Lynn describes the event:

We noticed Sean Connolly coming towards us, walking upright, although we had been advised to crouch and take cover as much as possible. We suddenly saw him fall mortally wounded by a sniper's bullet from the castle. First aid was useless. He died almost immediately.

Helena Molony, who also witnessed his death, recalled that his younger brother Matt, who was fifteen at the time, was on the City Hall roof and "cried bitterly" over his death. After he was shot, Molony said a prayer into his ear. According to Matthew's own witness statement, he saw his brother wounded, and later, finding himself alone,

There were snow boards along the valley gutters, between the sloping sections of the roof, and these I traversed, in an effort to find out where my comrades had gone, but without success, until I came across the body of my brother, Seán. I knelt to say a prayer for his departed soul.

== Personal life ==
Sean Connolly was a first-class inspector of paving and lighting in Dublin Corporation, a part-time teacher and an actor in the Abbey Theatre and the Irish Theatre. His last part was the lead in Under Which Flag by James Connolly.

He married Mary Christina Swanzy in 1910, and they had three children, Margaret, Kevin and Aidan. Christina Connolly, who was noted for her deep and beautiful singing voice and her beauty, was active during the War of Independence; during the Civil War she took the Treaty side. After his death she remarried Thomas Joseph McCarthy, a police superintendent, and became a school attendance officer for the Corporation.

== Commemoration ==
In 2016 a commemoration for Constable James O'Brien took place at Dublin Castle. Freya Connolly, great-granddaughter of Sean Connolly, placed flowers on behalf of the Connolly family.

To commemorate the 100th anniversary of the Easter Rising, An Post, the Irish postal service, released stamps of figures associated with the Rising. Sean Connolly and Constable James O'Brien appeared on a stamp together.

Connolly was 32 when he died. He was buried in Glasnevin Cemetery.
