= J. P. Vigier =

Canadian ice hockey player (born 1976)

Jean-Pierre Vigier
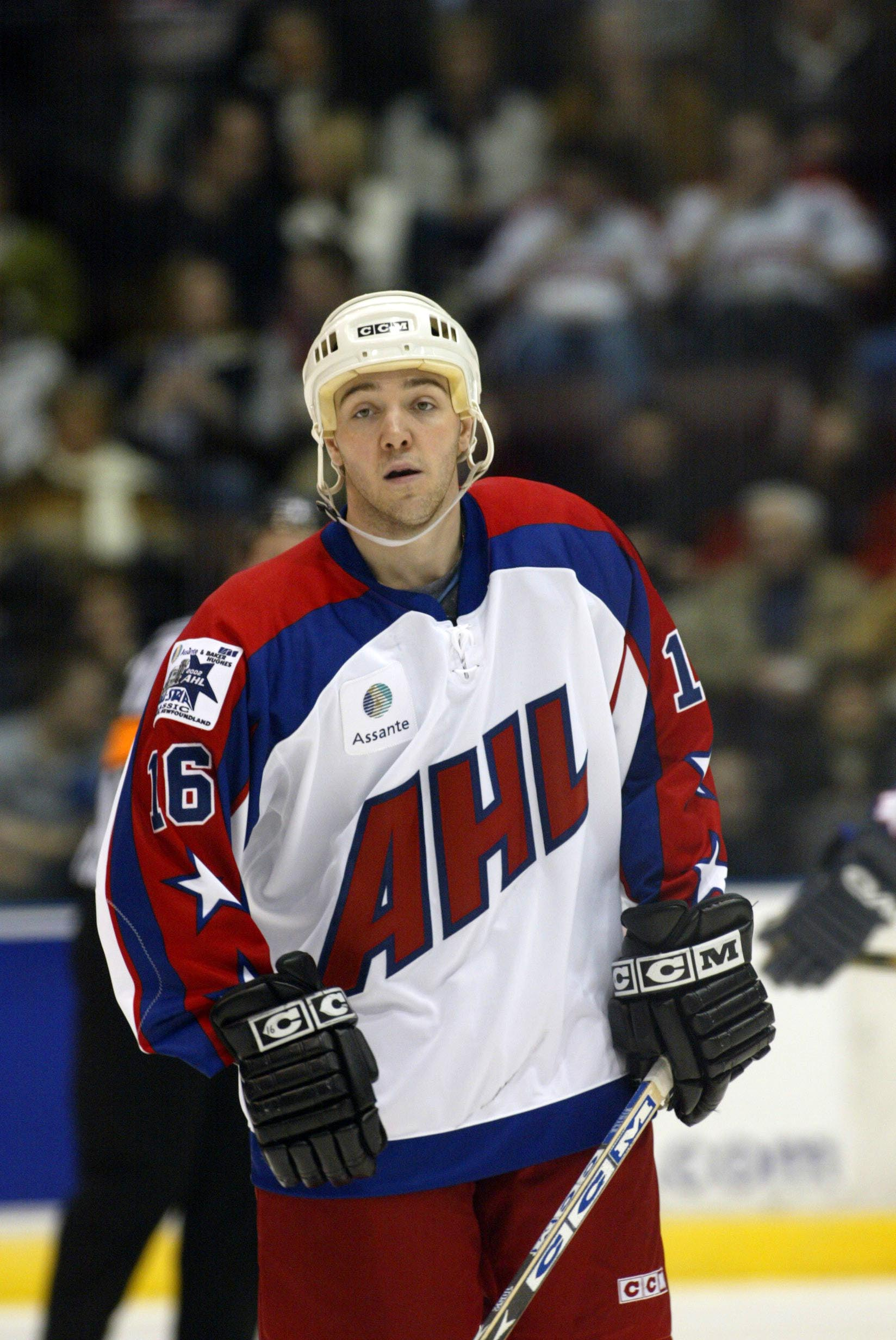
- Vigier in 2002
- Born: September 11, 1976 (age 49) Notre Dame de Lourdes, Manitoba, Canada
- Height: 6 ft 0 in (183 cm)
- Weight: 200 lb (91 kg; 14 st 4 lb)
- Position: Right wing
- Shot: Right
- Played for: Atlanta Thrashers; Genève-Servette HC; SC Bern
- NHL draft: Undrafted
- Playing career: 1999–2012

Jean-Pierre Vigier (born September 11, 1976) is a Canadian former professional ice hockey right winger. He played in the National Hockey League (NHL) for the Atlanta Thrashers and in Switzerland's National League A for Genève-Servette HC and SC Bern between 2000 and 2012. Vigier served as captain for SC Bern during away games.

== Playing career ==
Vigier spent four seasons at Northern Michigan University before signing as a free-agent with the Atlanta Thrashers of the National Hockey League. He began his professorial career in the International Hockey League with the Orlando Solar Bears. Vigier played parts of two season with the Solar Bears helping them to win the Turner Cup in 2001. He also made his NHL debut during the 2000–01 season, one of only two games he played at the NHL level that year. Following the 2000–01 season Vigier joined the Chicago Wolves of the American Hockey League (AHL). While with the Wolves he helped them win the Calder Cup in 2002, scoring 14 points in 21 play-off games. He split time between the Wolves and Thrashers for the next two seasons before becoming an NHL regular during the 2003–04 season. Vigier returned to the AHL for the 2004–05 season following the news that the 2004–05 NHL season was canceled due to the labor dispute. He went on to score 29 goals and 70 points while posting a career best plus-26, the successful season earned him AHL Second All-Star Team honors. He again helped the Wolves to the Calder Cup finals, registering 11 points in 18 play-off games. However, the Wolves were swept in the Calder Cup finals by the Philadelphia Phantoms.

Vigier returned to the NHL following the lockout but was limited to only 41 games due to a broken foot and a knee injury. He was re-signed by the Thrashers to a one-year deal in the off-season. He played in 72 games during 2006–07 season scoring 5 goals and 13 points. In 2007, he signed with Genève-Servette HC in Switzerland where he played for two seasons, scoring a total of 67 points. He joined National League A rival SC Bern on 18 June 2009.

=== International career ===
Vigier has represented Canada three times as a member of Team Canada at the 2007, 2008, and 2009 Spengler Cup tournaments. Winning the Spengler Cup in 2007.

== Career statistics ==
=== Regular season and playoffs ===
			Regular season					Playoffs
Season	Team	League	GP	G	A	Pts	PIM	GP	G	A	Pts	PIM
1995–96	Portage Terriers	MJHL	56	32	49	81	—	—	—	—	—	—
1996–97	Northern Michigan University	WCHA	35	10	14	24	54	—	—	—	—	—
1997–98	Northern Michigan University	WCHA	36	12	15	27	60	—	—	—	—	—
1998–99	Northern Michigan University	WCHA	42	21	18	39	80	—	—	—	—	—
1999–00	Northern Michigan University	WCHA	39	18	17	35	72	—	—	—	—	—
1999–00	Orlando Solar Bears	IHL	3	1	0	1	0	—	—	—	—	—
2000–01	Atlanta Thrashers	NHL	2	0	0	0	0	—	—	—	—	—
2000–01	Orlando Solar Bears	IHL	78	23	17	40	66	16	6	6	12	14
2001–02	Chicago Wolves	AHL	62	25	16	41	26	21	7	7	14	20
2001–02	Atlanta Thrashers	NHL	15	4	1	5	4	—	—	—	—	—
2002–03	Chicago Wolves	AHL	63	29	27	56	54	9	3	1	4	4
2002–03	Atlanta Thrashers	NHL	13	0	0	0	4	—	—	—	—	—
2003–04	Atlanta Thrashers	NHL	70	10	8	18	22	—	—	—	—	—
2004–05	Chicago Wolves	AHL	76	29	41	70	56	18	5	6	11	19
2005–06	Atlanta Thrashers	NHL	41	4	6	10	40	—	—	—	—	—
2006–07	Atlanta Thrashers	NHL	72	5	8	13	27	—	—	—	—	—
2007–08	Geneve-Servette	NLA	46	16	19	35	46	12	7	6	13	10
2008–09	Geneve-Servette	NLA	35	20	11	31	53	2	1	0	1	2
2009–10	SC Bern	NLA	49	13	25	38	50	14	7	7	14	6
2010–11	SC Bern	NLA	49	17	16	33	60	4	0	2	2	4
2011–12	SC Bern	NLA	37	7	7	14	24	3	0	0	0	4
NLA totals			216	73	78	151	233	35	15	15	30	26
NHL totals			213	23	23	46	97	—	—	—	—	—

== Awards and honours ==
Award	Year
Northern Michigan Steve Bozek Plus-Minus Award	1997–98
Northern Michigan Bill Joyce Best Forward Award	1998–99
All-CCHA Second Team	1998–99
CCHA All-Tournament Team	1999
Northern Michigan Brad Werenka Coaches Academic Award	1999–00
AHL Second All-Star Team	2004–05
