= Mikko Jokela =

Finnish ice hockey player

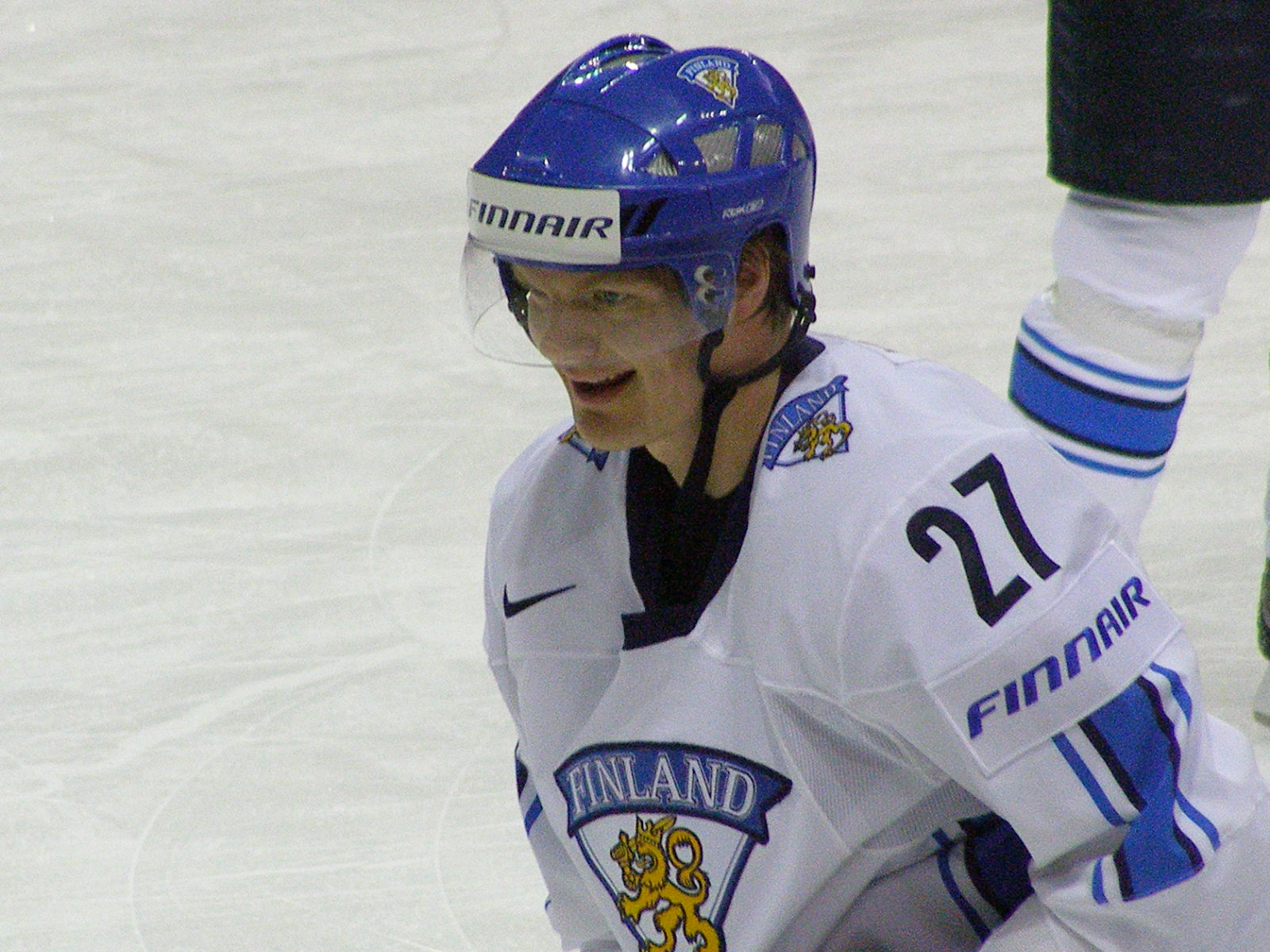
- Born: March 4, 1980 (age 46) Lappeenranta, Finland
- Height: 6 ft 1 in (185 cm)
- Weight: 194 lb (88 kg; 13 st 12 lb)
- Position: Defence
- Shot: Right
- Played for: HIFK; SaiPa; Vancouver Canucks; HPK; Jokerit; HC Dinamo Minsk; Timrå IK; KalPa; EC VSV; KooKoo
- National team: Finland
- NHL draft: 96th overall, 1998; New Jersey Devils
- Playing career: 1997–2017

Mikko Jokela (born March 4, 1980) is a Finnish former professional ice hockey defenceman. Jokela played one game in the National Hockey League for the Vancouver Canucks in 2003.

== Playing career ==
Jokela started his ice hockey career with the KalPa junior team, and was selected 96th overall in the 1998 NHL entry draft by the New Jersey Devils He represented various SM-liiga teams before he signed with the Devils for the 2001–02 NHL season. Jokela spent the season with the AHL Albany River Rats, and after starting the next season in the AHL, he was traded to the Vancouver Canucks for Steve Kariya, where he played his only NHL game in the 2002–03 season.

After another year with the Canucks' AHL affiliate Manitoba Moose, Jokela returned to Finland and signed with HPK. He was made team captain for the 2005–06 season when the team won the SM-liiga championship. In April 2007, he signed a three-year contract with Jokerit. However, he moved to KHL team HC Dynamo Minsk after his second season with Jokerit. After spending the 2009–10 season with Minsk, he took his game to Sweden and joined SHL side Timrå IK for the 2010–11 campaign. In 2011, he embarked on a three-year stint with HIFK in the Finnish Liiga.

On March 21, 2014, Jokela left HIFK after three seasons and signed a two-year contract in returning to captain fellow Finnish Liiga club, KalPa. He served as team captain both years and left for Austria when his contract was up, signing with EC VSV of the EBEL in May 2016.

Midway through his season with VSV, Jokela opted to leave the club and return to Finland with KooKoo of the Liiga, where he opted to end his professional playing career after 20 years.

== International play ==
Jokela made Finland's roster for the 2008 World Championships and also represented his country at the Euro Hockey Tour on several occasions.

== Career statistics ==
=== Regular season and playoffs ===
			Regular season					Playoffs
Season	Team	League	GP	G	A	Pts	PIM	GP	G	A	Pts	PIM
1994–95	KalPa U16	FIN Jr-3	29	7	12	19	36	—	—	—	—	—
1995–96	KalPa U16	FIN Jr-3	23	10	19	29	103	6	3	5	8	4
1995–96	KalPa U18	FIN Jr-2	9	2	1	3	20	19	20	15	35	27
1995–96	KalPa U20	FIN Jr	2	0	0	0	0	—	—	—	—	—
1996–97	KalPa U18	FIN Jr-2	11	3	2	5	8	5	1	1	2	4
1996–97	KalPa U20	FIN Jr	22	2	4	6	4	—	—	—	—	—
1997–98	HIFK U18	FIN Jr-2	4	5	1	6	2	—	—	—	—	—
1997–98	HIFK U20	FIN Jr	22	2	5	7	14	—	—	—	—	—
1997–98	HIFK	FIN	16	0	0	0	0	—	—	—	—	—
1997–98	Kokkolan Hermes	FIN-2	6	0	1	1	2	—	—	—	—	—
1998–99	HIFK	FIN	3	0	0	0	2	—	—	—	—	—
1998–99	HIFK U20	FIN Jr	1	1	0	1	2	—	—	—	—	—
1998–99	KalPa	FIN	42	1	2	3	18	—	—	—	—	—
1999–00	SaiPa U20	FIN Jr	4	2	2	4	2	2	0	0	0	2
1999–00	SaiPa	FIN	48	0	5	5	50	—	—	—	—	—
2000–01	SaiPa U20	FIN Jr	4	2	2	4	2	2	0	0	0	2
2000–01	SaiPa	FIN	50	1	0	1	24	—	—	—	—	—
2000–01	KooKoo	FIN-2	5	3	0	3	0	—	—	—	—	—
2001–02	Albany River Rats	AHL	56	5	13	18	28	—	—	—	—	—
2002–03	Albany River Rats	AHL	44	8	11	19	35	—	—	—	—	—
2002–03	Vancouver Canucks	NHL	1	0	0	0	0	—	—	—	—	—
2002–03	Manitoba Moose	AHL	32	3	7	10	17	14	1	4	5	2
2003–04	Manitoba Moose	AHL	78	5	10	15	52	—	—	—	—	—
2004–05	HPK	FIN	55	4	12	16	102	10	2	1	3	12
2005–06	HPK	FIN	25	6	2	8	65	11	2	3	5	43
2006–07	HPK	FIN	29	5	12	17	40	9	1	3	4	12
2007–08	Jokerit	FIN	51	7	11	18	42	14	1	3	4	12
2008–09	Jokerit	FIN	55	8	20	28	72	2	1	0	1	2
2009–10	Dinamo Minsk	KHL	18	0	2	2	6	—	—	—	—	—
2010–11	Timrå	SWE	44	1	10	11	56	—	—	—	—	—
2011–12	HIFK	FIN	45	4	8	12	70	4	0	0	0	4
2012–13	HIFK	FIN	56	3	11	14	88	8	0	1	1	4
2013–14	HIFK	FIN	51	1	11	12	24	2	0	0	0	0
2014–15	KalPa	FIN	53	3	6	9	40	6	0	0	0	2
2015–16	KalPa	FIN	56	2	2	4	40	3	0	0	0	2
2016–17	Villach	EBEL	15	2	3	5	16	—	—	—	—	—
2016–17	KooKoo	FIN	24	3	2	5	30	—	—	—	—	—
NHL totals			1	0	0	0	0	—	—	—	—	—
KHL totals			18	0	2	2	6	—	—	—	—	—
FIN totals			659	48	104	152	707	75	7	11	18	95

=== International ===
Year	Team	Event	GP	G	A	Pts	PIM
1997	Finland	U17	3	0	0	0	7
1997	Finland	EJC	6	1	0	1	6
1998	Finland	EJC	6	1	6	7	22
1999	Finland	WJC	6	0	2	2	6
2000	Finland	WJC	7	0	1	1	2
2008	Finland	WC	9	0	0	0	6
Junior totals			28	2	9	1	43
Senior totals			9	0	0	0	6
