= Košťál =

Košťál (Czech feminine: Košťálová) is a Czech surname which means 'stalk' in Czech. Notable people with the surname include:

- Irwin Kostal (1911–1994), American musician
- Jan Košťál (born 1980), Czech ice hockey player
- Jindra Košťálová, Czech gymnast
- Pavel Košťál (born 1980), Czech footballer
- Růžena Košťálová (1924–2024), Czech sprint canoer
- Zdeněk Košťál (1931–2015), Czech slalom canoer
- Rande Kostal (born 1957), Canadian legal academic and historian
