= Andrei Stas =

Belarusian ice hockey player (born 1988)

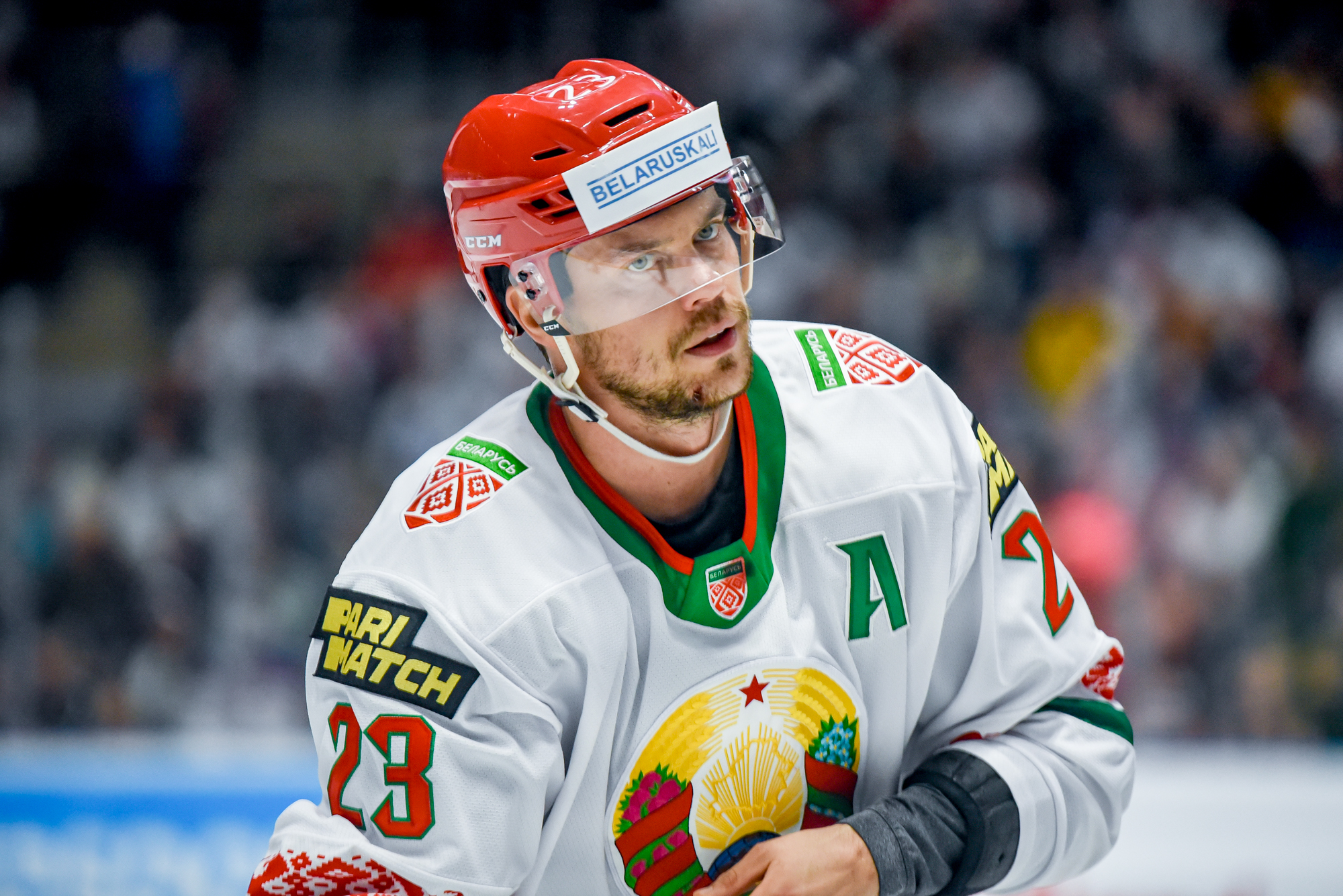
- Born: 18 October 1988 (age 37) Minsk, Byelorussian SSR, Soviet Union
- Height: 6 ft 2 in (188 cm)
- Weight: 194 lb (88 kg; 13 st 12 lb)
- Position: Centre
- Shoots: Left
- KHL team Former teams: Ak Bars Kazan; Yunost Minsk; Keramin Minsk; Dinamo Minsk; CSKA Moscow; Neftekhimik Nizhnekamsk; Avangard Omsk; Traktor Chelyabinsk
- National team: Belarus
- Playing career: 2008–present

Andrei Leonidovich Stas (Belarusian: Андрэй Леанідавіч Стась; Russian: Андрей Леонидович Стась; born 18 October 1988) is a Belarusian professional ice hockey forward who is currently playing for Ak Bars Kazan in the Kontinental Hockey League (KHL).

== Playing career ==
He began playing with Yunost Minsk in 2003 and later joined Keramin Minsk of the Belarusian Extraliga. During the 2008–09 season he made his debut with HC Dinamo Minsk. On 8 June 2014, Stas joined Russian club, CSKA Moscow on a three-year contract.

After helping Avangard Omsk to their maiden Gagarin Cup championship in the 2020–21 season, Stas left as a free agent to sign an optional three-year contract with Traktor Chelyabinsk on 5 May 2021.

Following two seasons in Chelyabinsk, Stas returned to Belarus and signed a two-year contract with former club, Dinamo Minsk, on 20 July 2023.

== International play ==
Stas was selected for the Belarus national men's ice hockey team in the 2010 Winter Olympics. He previously represented Belarus at the 2005 and 2006 IIHF World U18 Championships, the 2007 and 2008 World Junior Championship, and the 2009 Ice Hockey World Championships.

== Career statistics ==
=== Regular season and playoffs ===
			Regular season					Playoffs
Season	Team	League	GP	G	A	Pts	PIM	GP	G	A	Pts	PIM
2003–04	Yunost–2 Minsk	BLR.2	8	0	2	2	0	—	—	—	—	—
2004–05	Yunior Minsk	BLR.2	29	13	14	27	32	—	—	—	—	—
2005–06	Yunior Minsk	BLR.2	44	11	13	24	83	—	—	—	—	—
2006–07	Yunior Minsk	BLR.2	37	19	22	41	54	—	—	—	—	—
2006–07	Yunost Minsk	BLR	12	1	0	1	6	—	—	—	—	—
2007–08	Yunior Minsk	BLR.2	17	4	12	16	51	—	—	—	—	—
2007–08	Yunost Minsk	BLR	35	4	5	9	10	8	1	1	2	4
2008–09	Dinamo Minsk	KHL	27	3	2	5	28	—	—	—	—	—
2008–09	Keramin Minsk	BLR	12	2	10	12	20	—	—	—	—	—
2009–10	Dinamo Minsk	KHL	53	5	6	11	22	—	—	—	—	—
2010–11	Dinamo Minsk	KHL	49	3	5	8	42	7	0	1	1	8
2011–12	Dinamo Minsk	KHL	43	8	10	18	20	4	1	1	2	4
2012–13	Dinamo Minsk	KHL	48	5	9	14	30	—	—	—	—	—
2013–14	Dinamo Minsk	KHL	54	8	17	25	32	—	—	—	—	—
2014–15	CSKA Moscow	KHL	43	6	3	9	31	13	0	2	2	0
2015–16	Neftekhimik Nizhnekamsk	KHL	47	5	8	13	44	3	0	0	0	4
2016–17	Neftekhimik Nizhnekamsk	KHL	14	3	1	4	6	—	—	—	—	—
2016–17	Dinamo Minsk	KHL	33	3	7	10	23	5	1	0	1	2
2017–18	Avangard Omsk	KHL	52	1	8	9	16	7	0	5	5	0
2018–19	Avangard Omsk	KHL	53	3	3	6	14	19	1	1	2	0
2019–20	Avangard Omsk	KHL	62	1	2	3	35	6	1	0	1	0
2020–21	Avangard Omsk	KHL	42	1	7	8	15	19	0	3	3	4
2021–22	Traktor Chelyabinsk	KHL	26	7	1	8	4	15	1	1	2	8
2022–23	Traktor Chelyabinsk	KHL	59	1	7	8	29	—	—	—	—	—
2023–24	Dinamo Minsk	KHL	61	10	7	17	57	6	0	3	3	2
2024–25	Dinamo Minsk	KHL	54	5	8	13	14	11	1	0	1	0
2025–26	Dinamo Minsk	KHL	59	4	16	20	18	8	1	1	2	4
KHL totals			879	82	127	209	480	123	7	18	25	36

=== International ===
Year	Team	Event	GP	G	A	Pts	PIM
2005	Belarus	WJC18 D1	4	0	1	1	4
2006	Belarus	WJC18	6	0	1	1	6
2007	Belarus	WJC	6	1	0	1	2
2008	Belarus	WJC D1	5	0	3	3	31
2009	Belarus	WC	7	1	0	1	6
2010	Belarus	OG	4	0	0	0	2
2010	Belarus	WC	6	1	2	3	4
2011	Belarus	WC	6	0	0	0	0
2012	Belarus	WC	7	0	0	0	12
2013	Belarus	OGQ	2	0	0	0	0
2013	Belarus	WC	7	0	2	2	2
2014	Belarus	WC	8	1	3	4	2
2015	Belarus	WC	8	1	1	2	0
2016	Belarus	WC	7	5	0	5	8
2016	Belarus	OGQ	3	2	2	4	16
2017	Belarus	WC	7	1	1	2	6
2021	Belarus	OGQ	3	1	1	2	4
Junior totals			21	1	5	6	43
Senior totals			75	13	12	25	62

== Awards and honors ==
Award	Year
KHL
Gagarin Cup (Avangard Omsk)	2021
