= Scott King (ice hockey, born 1977) =

Canadian ice hockey player

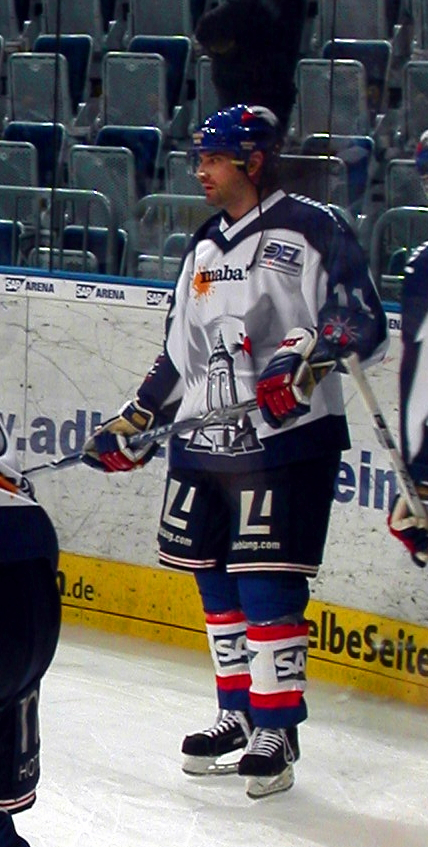
- Born: January 21, 1977 (age 49) Saskatoon, Saskatchewan, Canada
- Height: 5 ft 11 in (180 cm)
- Weight: 175 lb (79 kg; 12 st 7 lb)
- Position: Centre
- Shot: Right
- Played for: New Orleans Brass; Fredericton Canadiens; Mississippi Sea Wolves; Springfield Falcons; Milwaukee Admirals; Charlotte Checkers; EC Bad Tölz; Iserlohn Roosters; Krefeld Pinguine; Augsburger Panther; Nuremberg Ice Tigers; Adler Mannheim; Hannover Scorpions; Lausitzer Füchse
- NHL draft: Undrafted
- Playing career: 1997–2015

Scott King (born January 21, 1977) is a Canadian former professional ice hockey player who last played for Lausitzer Füchse in the DEL2 league.

== Career statistics ==
			Regular season					Playoffs
Season	Team	League	GP	G	A	Pts	PIM	GP	G	A	Pts	PIM
1994–95	Calgary Royals	AJHL	56	36	48	84	77	—	—	—	—	—
1995–96	Boston University	NCAA	18	5	9	14	38	—	—	—	—	—
1996–97	Kelowna Rockets	WHL	68	40	57	97	96	6	1	2	3	8
1997–98	New Orleans Brass	ECHL	56	26	46	72	34	4	0	6	6	6
1997–98	Fredericton Canadiens	AHL	3	0	0	0	4	—	—	—	—	—
1998–99	Fredericton Canadiens	AHL	70	14	19	43	42	6	2	3	5	2
1999–00	Mississippi Sea Wolves	ECHL	42	16	35	51	54	7	0	2	2	10
1999–00	Springfield Falcons	AHL	12	2	4	6	8	—	—	—	—	—
1999–00	Milwaukee Admirals	IHL	12	1	2	3	0	—	—	—	—	—
2000–01	Charlotte Checkers	ECHL	72	40	61	101	34	5	1	1	2	12
2001–02	EC Bad Tölz	Germany2	52	25	48	73	60	3	0	0	0	8
2002–03	Iserlohn Roosters	DEL	52	12	26	38	42	—	—	—	—	—
2003–04	Iserlohn Roosters	DEL	51	18	31	49	58	—	—	—	—	—
2004–05	Krefeld Pinguine	DEL	52	12	30	42	28	—	—	—	—	—
2005–06	Augsburger Panther	DEL	52	22	38	60	64	—	—	—	—	—
2006–07	Nuremberg Ice Tigers	DEL	52	22	29	51	36	13	3	3	6	34
2007–08	Nuremberg Ice Tigers	DEL	49	14	37	51	38	5	0	1	1	2
2008–09	Nuremberg Ice Tigers	DEL	50	17	38	55	42	—	—	—	—	—
2009–10	Adler Mannheim	DEL	56	23	22	45	14	2	1	0	1	2
2010–11	Adler Mannheim	DEL	49	7	15	22	10	6	1	4	5	0
2011–12	Hannover Scorpions	DEL	52	15	20	35	26	—	—	—	—	—
2012–13	Hannover Scorpions	DEL	52	9	25	34	22	—	—	—	—	—
2013–14	Lausitzer Füchse	DEL2	47	15	45	60	18	5	1	0	1	2
2014–15	Lausitzer Füchse	DEL2	50	23	32	55	24	3	2	1	3	0
DEL totals			567	171	311	482	380	26	5	8	13	38

== Awards and honours ==
- ECHL Most Valuable Player (2000–01)
- ECHL Leading Scorer (2000–01)
- Participated in 2009 Spengler Cup (with Adler Mannheim)
