= Yannick Tremblay =

Canadian ice hockey player (born 1975)

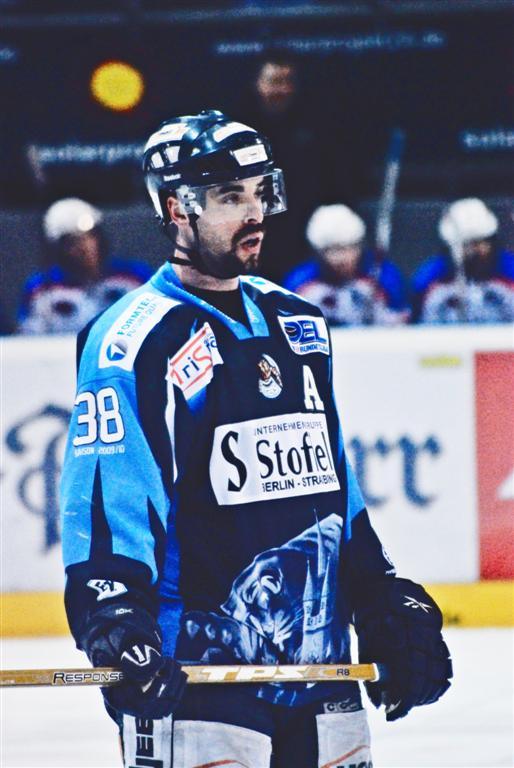
- Born: November 15, 1975 (age 50) Pointe-aux-Trembles, Quebec, Canada
- Height: 6 ft 2 in (188 cm)
- Weight: 200 lb (91 kg; 14 st 4 lb)
- Position: Defence
- Shot: Right
- Played for: Toronto Maple Leafs; Atlanta Thrashers; Adler Mannheim; Vancouver Canucks; HC Lugano; Straubing Tigers; Graz 99ers
- National team: Canada
- NHL draft: 145th overall, 1995; Toronto Maple Leafs
- Playing career: 1996–2011

Yannick Tremblay (born November 15, 1975) is a Canadian former professional ice hockey defenceman who played in the National Hockey League (NHL) for the Toronto Maple Leafs, Atlanta Thrashers and Vancouver Canucks.

== Playing career ==
As a youth, Tremblay played in the 1988 Quebec International Pee-Wee Hockey Tournament with a minor ice hockey team from Pointe-aux-Trembles.

Tremblay was drafted 145th overall by the Toronto Maple Leafs in the 1995 NHL entry draft. After a three-game stint with the St. John's Maple Leafs, Toronto's American Hockey League (AHL) affiliate club, in 1995–96, he spent the next two seasons splitting time between both Maple Leaf clubs. In 1998–99, he played for the parent club full-time; however, he only played in 35 games.

In 1999, Tremblay was selected by the Atlanta Thrashers in the 1999 NHL Expansion Draft and spent five seasons with the team. His best season statistically in the NHL came in 2002–03, when he scored 8 goals and 22 assists for 30 points in 75 games. By the end of his stint in Atlanta, he solely held the franchise record for most points by a defenceman with 107 until Tobias Enström matched him on 14 January 2010. The 2004–05 NHL season was locked out and Tremblay played in Germany's Deutsche Eishockey Liga (DEL) for Adler Mannheim, eventually staying for a second season. On 28 July 2006, the Vancouver Canucks signed Tremblay, but he only managed to play 12 games with the Canucks as he spent most of the 2006–07 season with the Manitoba Moose, the Canucks' AHL affiliate. Tremblay also currently has the worst plus/minus rating of any player in the Atlanta Thrashers' franchise history with a rating of –103.

Tremblay then signed with HC Lugano of the Swiss National League A (NLA) on 18 July 2007, playing only the 2007–08 season before taking a one-year sabbatical. He returned to the DEL after signing with the Straubing Tigers in July 2009. After one season with DEL, he signed with Graz 99ers.

== International play ==
Tremblay played for Canada at the 2000 IIHF World Championship. The team placed fourth after falling 2–1 to Finland in the third-place match.

Tremblay also represented Canada at the 2007 and 2009 Spengler Cups, winning gold in both tournaments.

== Career statistics ==
=== Regular season and playoffs ===
			Regular season					Playoffs
Season	Team	League	GP	G	A	Pts	PIM	GP	G	A	Pts	PIM
1991–92	Montréal–Bourassa Canadien	QMAAA	35	2	3	5	10	8	0	4	4	2
1992–93	Montréal–Bourassa Canadien	CEGEP	21	2	5	7	10	3	0	0	0	2
1992–93	Chicoutimi Saguenéens	QMJHL	2	0	0	0	0	—	—	—	—	—
1993–94	St. Thomas University	AUS	25	2	3	5	10	—	—	—	—	—
1994–95	Beauport Harfangs	QMJHL	70	10	32	42	22	17	6	8	14	6
1995–96	Beauport Harfangs	QMJHL	61	12	33	45	42	20	3	16	19	18
1995–96	St. John's Maple Leafs	AHL	3	0	1	1	0	—	—	—	—	—
1996–97	St. John's Maple Leafs	AHL	67	7	25	32	34	11	2	9	11	0
1996–97	Toronto Maple Leafs	NHL	5	0	0	0	0	—	—	—	—	—
1997–98	St. John's Maple Leafs	AHL	17	3	6	9	4	4	0	1	1	5
1997–98	Toronto Maple Leafs	NHL	38	2	4	6	6	—	—	—	—	—
1998–99	Toronto Maple Leafs	NHL	35	2	7	9	16	—	—	—	—	—
1999–2000	Atlanta Thrashers	NHL	75	10	21	31	22	—	—	—	—	—
2000–01	Atlanta Thrashers	NHL	46	4	8	12	30	—	—	—	—	—
2001–02	Atlanta Thrashers	NHL	66	9	15	24	47	—	—	—	—	—
2002–03	Atlanta Thrashers	NHL	75	8	22	30	32	—	—	—	—	—
2003–04	Atlanta Thrashers	NHL	38	2	8	10	13	—	—	—	—	—
2004–05	Adler Mannheim	DEL	14	1	4	5	16	14	2	6	8	6
2005–06	Adler Mannheim	DEL	46	11	17	28	44	—	—	—	—	—
2006–07	Manitoba Moose	AHL	44	12	20	32	40	12	3	7	10	11
2006–07	Vancouver Canucks	NHL	12	1	2	3	12	—	—	—	—	—
2007–08	HC Lugano	NLA	46	8	21	29	34	4	0	5	5	6
2009–10	Straubing Tigers	DEL	41	2	16	18	24	—	—	—	—	—
2010–11	Graz 99ers	AUT	54	9	22	31	44	4	0	0	0	6
AHL totals			132	22	54	76	78	27	5	17	22	16
NHL totals			390	38	87	125	178	—	—	—	—	—
DEL totals			101	14	37	51	84	14	2	6	8	6

=== International ===
Year	Team	Event	Result	GP	G	A	Pts	PIM
2000	Canada	WC	4th	9	1	1	2	0
Senior totals				9	1	1	2	0
