= Denis Kochetkov =

Russian ice hockey player

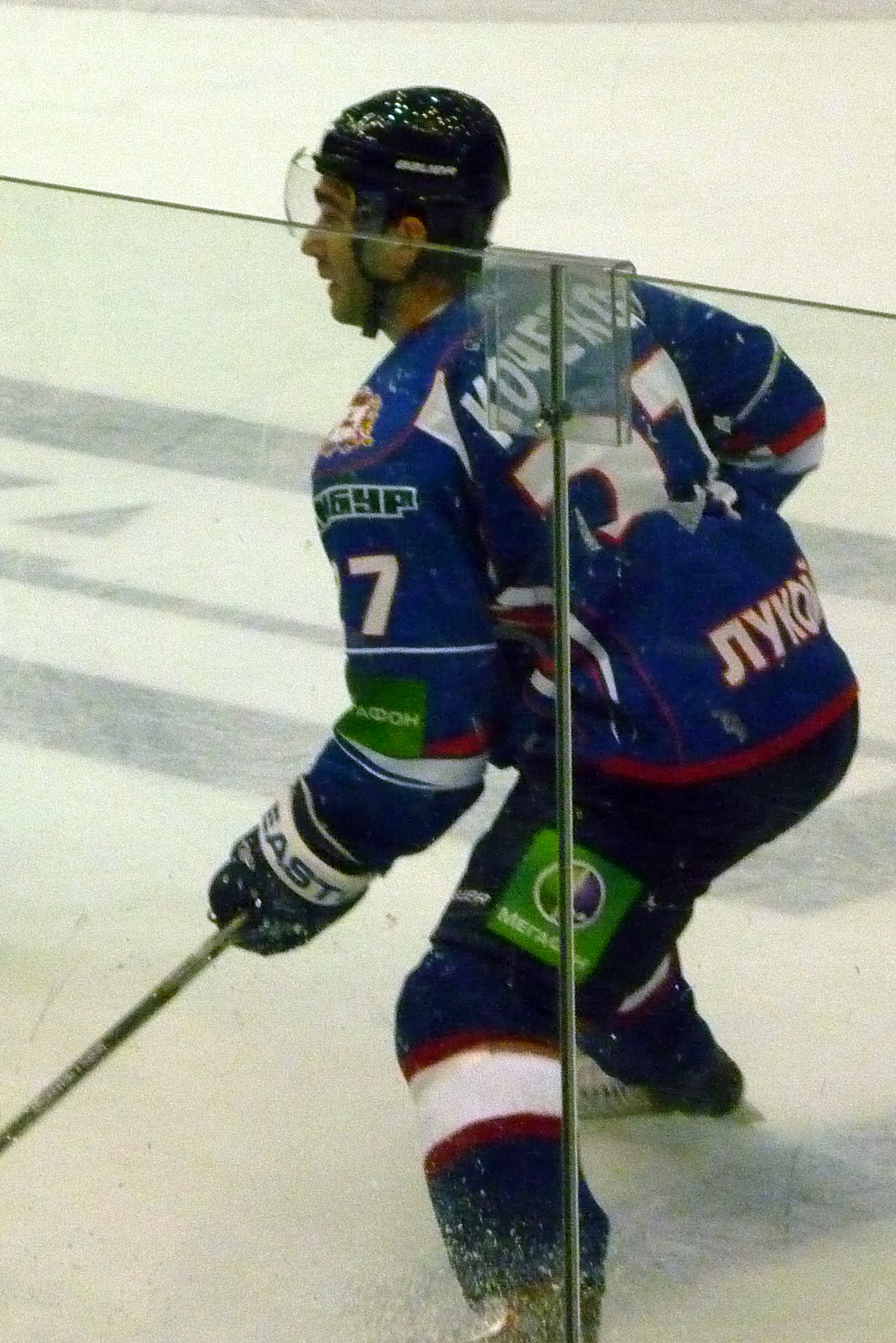
- Denis Kochetkov as of 12 December 2010
- Position: Forward
- KHL team: HC Dinamo Minsk

Denis Kochetkov is a Russian professional ice hockey forward who currently plays for HC Dinamo Minsk of the Kontinental Hockey League (KHL).
