= Sergei Berdnikov =

Russian ice hockey player

- Born: January 15, 1971 (age 55) Angarsk, Soviet Union
- Height: 6 ft 2 in (188 cm)
- Weight: 198 lb (90 kg; 14 st 2 lb)
- Position: Left wing
- Shot: Left
- team Former teams: retired HC Sibir Novosibirsk; Metallurg Novokuznetsk; HC MVD; Severstal Cherepovets; Avangard Omsk; Torpedo Yaroslavl; HC Lada Togliatti
- Playing career: 1988–2009

Sergei Pavlovich Berdnikov (Russian: Серге́й Павлович Бердников; born January 5, 1971, in Bratsk, USSR), is a Russian former ice hockey player. He played for Avangard Omsk from 1989–1994 and 1996-1998.

== Career statistics ==
| | | | Regular season | | | | | Playoffs |
| Season | Team | League | GP | G | A | Pts | PIM | GP | G | A | Pts | PIM |
|---|---|---|---|---|---|---|---|---|---|---|---|---|
| 1988–89 | Avangard Omsk | USSR-2 | 49 | 3 | 2 | 5 | 10 | — | — | — | — | — |
| 1989–90 | Avangard Omsk | USSR-2 | 1 | 0 | 0 | 0 | 0 | — | — | — | — | — |
| 1989–90 | Ermak Angarsk | USSR-3 | 60 | 45 | 15 | 60 | — | — | — | — | — | — |
| 1990–91 | Avangard Omsk | USSR-2 | 64 | 19 | 13 | 32 | 38 | — | — | — | — | — |
| 1991–92 | Avangard Omsk | CIS | 24 | 1 | 1 | 2 | 12 | — | — | — | — | — |
| 1992–93 | Avangard Omsk | IHL | 36 | 13 | 6 | 19 | 22 | 4 | 1 | 0 | 1 | 0 |
| 1993–94 | Avangard Omsk | IHL | 11 | 5 | 4 | 9 | 0 | — | — | — | — | — |
| 1993–94 | Providence Bruins | AHL | 16 | 3 | 1 | 4 | 4 | — | — | — | — | — |
| 1993–94 | Charlotte Checkers | ECHL | 48 | 48 | 39 | 87 | 69 | 3 | 1 | 0 | 1 | 4 |
| 1994–95 | Charlotte Checkers | ECHL | 65 | 37 | 39 | 76 | 36 | 3 | 0 | 2 | 2 | 0 |
| 1995–96 | Avangard Omsk | IHL | 48 | 14 | 12 | 26 | 36 | — | — | — | — | — |
| 1996–97 | Avangard Omsk | RSL | 46 | 21 | 13 | 34 | 11 | — | — | — | — | — |
| 1996–97 | HC Lada Togliatti | RSL | 2 | 0 | 0 | 0 | 0 | — | — | — | — | — |
| 1997–98 | Avangard Omsk | RSL | 34 | 7 | 7 | 14 | 14 | — | — | — | — | — |
| 1997–98 | Torpedo Yaroslavl | RSL | 9 | 4 | 2 | 6 | 8 | — | — | — | — | — |
| 1998–99 | Severstal Cherepovets | RSL | 34 | 8 | 16 | 24 | 10 | 3 | 0 | 0 | 0 | 12 |
| 1999–00 | Severstal Cherepovets | RSL | 33 | 9 | 11 | 20 | 32 | 8 | 3 | 2 | 5 | 8 |
| 2000–01 | Severstal Cherepovets | RSL | 42 | 9 | 9 | 18 | 12 | 9 | 0 | 2 | 2 | 10 |
| 2001–02 | Severstal Cherepovets | RSL | 51 | 9 | 21 | 30 | 42 | 4 | 0 | 0 | 0 | 27 |
| 2002–03 | Severstal Cherepovets | RSL | 51 | 15 | 16 | 31 | 38 | 12 | 3 | 4 | 7 | 20 |
| 2003–04 | Avangard Omsk | RSL | 25 | 1 | 3 | 4 | 16 | — | — | — | — | — |
| 2003–04 | Severstal Cherepovets | RSL | 28 | 6 | 5 | 11 | 10 | — | — | — | — | — |
| 2004–05 | Severstal Cherepovets | RSL | 49 | 11 | 8 | 19 | 48 | — | — | — | — | — |
| 2005–06 | Metallurg Novokuznetsk | RSL | 42 | 7 | 9 | 16 | 52 | 3 | 0 | 0 | 0 | 8 |
| 2006–07 | Metallurg Novokuznetsk | RSL | 53 | 12 | 10 | 22 | 56 | 3 | 0 | 0 | 0 | 4 |
| 2007–08 | HC MVD | RSL | 52 | 14 | 10 | 24 | 18 | 2 | 0 | 0 | 0 | 0 |
| 2008–09 | Metallurg Novokuznetsk | KHL | 18 | 1 | 4 | 5 | 12 | — | — | — | — | — |
| 2008–09 | HC Sibir Novosibirsk | KHL | 24 | 2 | 4 | 6 | 4 | — | — | — | — | — |
