= Byelorussian Soviet Socialist Republic League =

BSSR League
- Sport: Ice hockey
- Founded: 1965
- Folded: 1991
- Country: (Byelorussian Soviet Socialist Republic) Byelorussian SSR

The Byelorussian Soviet Socialist Republic League was an ice hockey league contested in the Byelorussian SSR. The league usually consisted of two groups.

== Champions ==
- 1965: Vympel Minsk
- 1966: HC Dinamo Minsk (Group A), Vympel Minsk (Group B)
- 1967: SKA Minsk (Group I), Lokomotiv Gomel (Group II)
- 1968: HC Dinamo Minsk (Group I), Neftyanik Novopolotsk (Group II)
- 1969: Vympel Minsk (Group I), Neftyanik Novopolotsk (Group II)
- 1970: HC Dinamo Minsk (Group I), Gomel GSU (Group IIA), Puffin Minsk (Group IIB)
- 1971: Spartak Vitebsk (Group I), Neftyanik Novopolotsk (Group II)
- 1972: Vympel Minsk (Group I), ETZ Gomel (Group II)
- 1973: Vympel Minsk (Group I), Fiberlgass Polotsk (Group II)
- 1974: Vympel Minsk (Group I), Satellite Minsk (Group II)
- 1975: Builder Bobruisk (Group I), Dvina Novopolotsk (Group II)
- 1976: ETZ Gomel (Group I), Harvest Vitebsk (Group II)
- 1977: Shinnik Bobruisk (Group I), Satellite Minsk (Group II)
- 1978: Shinnik Bobruisk (Group I), Berezina Borisov (Group II)
- 1979: Vympel Minsk (Group I)
- 1980: Yunost Minsk (Group I), Metallurg Mogilev (Group II)
- 1981: Shinnik Bobruisk (Group I), BPL Minsk (Group II)
- 1982: Shinnik Bobruisk (Group I), Motorist Minsk (Group II)
- 1983: Shinnik Bobruisk (Group I), KSM Grodno (Group II)
- 1984: unknown
- 1985: Shinnik Bobruisk (Group I), Instrument Vitebsk (Group II)
- 1986: Shinnik Bobruisk (Group I), Traktor Minsk (Group II)
- 1987: SHVSM Grodno (Group I), Instrument Vitebsk (Group II)
- 1988: SHVSM Grodno (Group I), Khimik Novopolotsk (Group II)
- 1989: Shinnik Bobruisk (Group I), BPL Minsk (Group II)
- 1990: Khimik Novopolotsk (Group I), Polesie Gomel (Group II)
- 1991: Belstal Zhlobin (Group I), Traktor Minsk (Group II)
