= Belarusian Cup (ice hockey) =

The Belarusian Cup is the national ice hockey cup competition in Belarus. It has been contested annually since 2002.

== Winners ==
- 2021: HC Dinamo Minsk
- 2020: HC Dinamo Minsk
- 2019: Yunost Minsk
- 2018: HK Neman Grodno
- 2017: HK Homiel
- 2016: HK Neman Grodno
- 2015: Yunost Minsk
- 2014: HK Neman Grodno
- 2013: Yunost Minsk
- 2012: HK Homiel
- 2011: Metallurg Zhlobin
- 2010: Yunost Minsk
- 2009: Yunost Minsk
- 2008: Keramin Minsk
- 2007: HK Homiel
- 2006: HC Dinamo Minsk
- 2005: HC Dinamo Minsk
- 2004: Yunost Minsk
- 2003: HK Homiel
- 2002: Keramin Minsk
