= Juraj Kolník =

Slovak ice hockey player (born 1980)

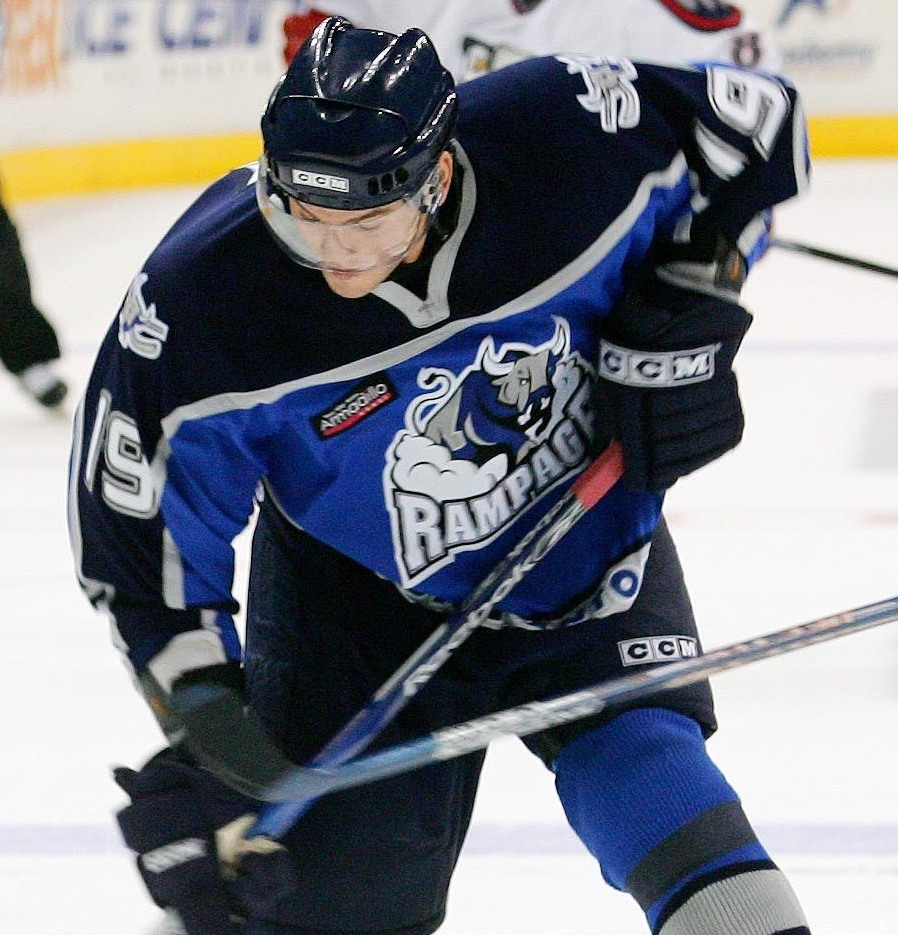
- Kolník with the San Antonio Rampage in 2004
- Born: November 13, 1980 (age 45) Nitra, Czechoslovakia
- Height: 5 ft 11 in (180 cm)
- Weight: 198 lb (90 kg; 14 st 2 lb)
- Position: Right wing
- Shot: Right
- Played for: HK Nitra; New York Islanders; Florida Panthers; Genève-Servette HC; HC Dynamo Moscow; ZSC Lions; Rapperswil-Jona Lakers; Nottingham Panthers
- National team: Slovakia
- NHL draft: 101st overall, 1999; New York Islanders
- Playing career: 2000–2018

Juraj Kolník (born November 13, 1980) is a Slovak former professional ice hockey forward, who last played for the Jonquière Marquis of the Ligue Nord-Américaine de Hockey.

Kolník has previously played in the National Hockey League (NHL), appearing in 176 games between the New York Islanders and Florida Panthers. He was selected by the Islanders in the fourth round, 101st overall, in the 1999 NHL entry draft.

In 2015, Kolnik signed with the Nottingham Panthers in the Elite Ice Hockey League (EIHL).

== Career statistics ==
=== Regular season and playoffs ===
			Regular season					Playoffs
Season	Team	League	GP	G	A	Pts	PIM	GP	G	A	Pts	PIM
1997–98	MHC Nitra	SVK	28	1	3	4	6	—	—	—	—	—
1998–99	Québec Remparts	QMJHL	12	6	5	11	6	—	—	—	—	—
1998–99	Rimouski Océanic	QMJHL	50	36	37	73	34	11	9	6	15	6
1999–2000	Rimouski Océanic	QMJHL	47	53	53	106	53	14	10	17	27	16
2000–01	New York Islanders	NHL	29	4	3	7	12	—	—	—	—	—
2000–01	Lowell Lock Monsters	AHL	25	2	6	8	18	—	—	—	—	—
2000–01	Springfield Falcons	AHL	29	15	20	35	20	—	—	—	—	—
2001–02	New York Islanders	NHL	7	2	0	2	0	—	—	—	—	—
2001–02	Bridgeport Sound Tigers	AHL	67	18	30	48	40	20	7	14	21	17
2002–03	Florida Panthers	NHL	10	0	1	1	0	—	—	—	—	—
2002–03	San Antonio Rampage	AHL	65	25	15	40	36	3	0	1	1	4
2003–04	Florida Panthers	NHL	63	14	11	25	14	—	—	—	—	—
2003–04	San Antonio Rampage	AHL	15	2	14	16	21	—	—	—	—	—
2004–05	San Antonio Rampage	AHL	74	13	16	29	24	—	—	—	—	—
2005–06	Florida Panthers	NHL	77	15	20	35	40	—	—	—	—	—
2006–07	Florida Panthers	NHL	64	11	14	25	18	—	—	—	—	—
2007–08	Genève–Servette HC	NLA	50	21	46	67	30	11	2	8	10	8
2008–09	Genève–Servette HC	NLA	49	25	47	72	64	3	0	1	1	30
2009–10	Genève–Servette HC	NLA	46	26	23	49	93	16	6	4	10	36
2010–11	Dynamo Moscow	KHL	8	1	4	5	6	—	—	—	—	—
2011–12	Dynamo Balashikha	RUS.2	1	1	0	1	0	—	—	—	—	—
2011–12	ZSC Lions	NLA	6	0	2	2	0	9	1	2	3	4
2011–12	GCK Lions	SUI.2	2	0	0	0	0	—	—	—	—	—
2012–13	Rapperswil–Jona Lakers	NLA	33	10	11	21	6	—	—	—	—	—
2013–14	SCL Tigers	SUI.2	27	9	8	17	10	5	1	2	3	4
2014–15	Laval Prédateurs	LNAH	37	24	40	64	10	4	1	3	4	0
2015–16	Nottingham Panthers	EIHL	50	28	29	57	32	4	1	3	4	4
2016–17	Jonquière Marquis	LNAH	29	18	16	34	6	15	10	8	18	4
2017–18	Jonquière Marquis	LNAH	30	7	19	26	8	5	1	0	1	0
NHL totals			250	46	49	95	84	—	—	—	—	—
AHL totals			275	75	101	176	159	23	7	15	22	21
NLA totals			184	82	129	211	193	39	9	15	24	78

=== International ===
Year	Team	Event	Result	GP	G	A	Pts	PIM
1998	Slovakia	EJC	6th	6	1	3	4	18
2000	Slovakia	WJC	9th	7	2	1	3	2
2004	Slovakia	WC	4th	7	0	0	0	0
2008	Slovakia	WC	13th	5	3	4	7	2
Junior totals				13	3	4	7	20
Senior totals				12	3	4	7	2
