= Michael Kahn (businessman) =

American businessman

Michael A. Kahn
- Occupation: Businessman
- Known for: Owner of the Charlotte Checkers ( AHL )

Michael A. Kahn is an American businessman based in Charlotte, North Carolina.

In June 2006, Kahn bought the Charlotte Checkers, a minor professional ice hockey team that played in the ECHL. In 2010 he brought the American Hockey League to Charlotte when he purchased and relocated the Albany River Rats, since renamed the Charlotte Checkers.
