= Charlotte Checkers (1993–2010) =

- City: Charlotte, North Carolina
- League: ECHL
- Operated: 1993–2010
- Home arena: Time Warner Cable Arena
- Colors: Powder blue, navy blue, red, white
- Owner: Michael Kahn

Franchise history
- 1993–2010: Charlotte Checkers

Championships
- Regular season titles: none
- Division titles: none
- Conference titles: 1995–96
- Kelly Cups: 1995–96

The Charlotte Checkers were an American ice hockey team in Charlotte, North Carolina, and played in the ECHL (formerly the East Coast Hockey League).

== Franchise history ==
Following a 17-year break from ice hockey, the Checkers returned in 1993 and made the playoffs ten times, including winning the ECHL Championship in 1996.

The Checkers franchise was founded in 1993, and was owned by a consortium headed by local auto dealer and NASCAR team owner Felix Sabates, with former Charlotte Hornets president Carl Scheer and NASCAR drivers Richard and Kyle Petty among the minority partners. They played in the old Charlotte Coliseum, which was heavily renovated and renamed Independence Arena.

Soon after winning the Jack Riley Cup in 1996, Sabates sold controlling interest minority partner Tim Braswell, who claimed he could make the team more popular. However, in a case of exceptionally bad timing, this came just as the NFL's Carolina Panthers were due to open their new downtown stadium. The team's popularity faded, forcing Braswell to sell the Checkers to Hornets owners George Shinn and Ray Wooldrige in 2000 for $3 million. However, Shinn and Wooldridge were unable to revive the team at the gate, forcing them to sell the team back to Sabates and Scheer for $500,000. By comparison, Sabates had sold the team in 1996 for $5 million.

The Checkers played at the old coliseum, which was later renamed Cricket Arena, until 2005 when they moved to Time Warner Cable Arena in downtown Charlotte. The team set their all-time attendance record of 12,398 on February 21, 2009 in a 5-2 win against the Florida Everblades. Their previous record was 11,237 in a loss against the Texas Wildcatters in February 2007.

On January 21, 2010, it was reported that Michael Kahn, who had bought the team from Sabates and Scheer in 2006, was in talks to buy the Albany River Rats, the American Hockey League affiliate of the NHL's Carolina Hurricanes. On February 10, the sale of the River Rats to Kahn was confirmed. Kahn then moved the Rats to Charlotte and changed their name to the Checkers starting with the 2010–11 season. As a result of this, Kahn returned the Checkers ECHL franchise to the ECHL at the end of the 2009–10 ECHL season, ending the franchise's ECHL history.

== Season-by-season record ==
Records as of 2009–10 season.

Season	Conference	Division	Regular Season										Post Season Result	Individual & team honors
Season	Conference	Division	GP	W	L	OTL	SOL	Pts	Pct	GF	GA	Coach	Post Season Result	Individual & team honors
1993–94		East	68	39	25	1	3	82	0.574	281	271	John Marks	Lost in round 1	
1994–95		East	68	37	22	4	5	83	0.544	274	261	John Marks	Lost in round 1	
1995–96		East	70	45	21		4	94	0.643	294	250	John Marks	Won Championship	Riley Cup; Riley Cup MVP (Nick Vitucci)
1996–97		East	70	35	28		7	77	0.55	271	267	John Marks	Lost in round 1	
1997–98	Southern	Southeast	70	35	24		11	81	0.579	251	237	John Marks	Lost in round 2	
1998–99	Southern	Southeast	70	29	30		11	69	0.493	221	262	Shawn Wheeler	Out of Playoffs	
1999–00	Southern	Northeast	70	25	38		7	54	0.357	186	254	Shawn Wheeler; Don MacAdam	Out of Playoffs	
2000–01	Southern	Northeast	72	34	26	6	6	80	0.556	247	252	Don MacAdam	Lost in round 2	ECHL MVP (Scott King); Leading Scorer (Scott King)
2001–02	Southern	Northeast	72	41	20	3	8	93	0.646	256	207	Don MacAdam	Lost in round 2	
2002–03	Southern	Northeast	72	41	28	3	0	85	0.59	262	234	Don MacAdam	Out of Playoffs	
2003–04	Eastern	Southern	72	31	32	4	5	71	0.493	206	230	Don MacAdam; Derek Wilkinson	Out of Playoffs	
2004–05	American	East	72	39	26	2	5	85	0.59	226	219	Derek Wilkinson	Lost in round 3	
2005–06	American	South	72	33	34	2	3	71	0.493	232	254	Derek Wilkinson	Lost in round 1	
2006–07	American	South	72	42	27	1	2	87	0.604	252	220	Derek Wilkinson	Lost in round 2	
2007–08	American	South	72	34	31	1	6	75	0.472	212	219	Derek Wilkinson	Lost in round 1	
2008–09	American	South	71	34	29	2	6	76	0.535	217	224	Derek Wilkinson	Lost in round 1	
2009–10	American	South	72	43	21	4	4	94	0.653	253	223	Derek Wilkinson	Lost in round 2	
Totals			1205	617	462	33	93			4141	4084			1 Riley Cup; 3 individual player awards

Notes: There were no conferences in the ECHL prior to the 1997–98 season. Games tied at end of regulation went directly to shootout from 1995–2000

== Playoffs ==
- 1993–94: Lost to Greensboro 2-1 in first round.
- 1994–95: Lost to Greensboro 3-0 in first round.
- 1995–96: Defeated Roanoke 3-0 in first round; defeated South Carolina 3-2 in quarterfinals; defeated Tallahassee 3-1 in semifinals; defeated Jacksonville 4-0 to win championship.
- 1996–97: Lost to South Carolina 3-0 in first round.
- 1997–98: Defeated Birmingham 3-1 in first round; lost to Pensacola 3-0 in quarterfinals.
- 1998–99: Did not qualify.
- 1999–00: Did not qualify.
- 2000–01: Lost to Dayton 3-2 in first round.
- 2001–02: Lost to Atlantic City 3-2 in first round.
- 2002–03: Did not qualify.
- 2003–04: Did not qualify.
- 2004–05: Defeated Columbia 3-2 in first round; defeated Gwinnett 3-1 in quarterfinals; lost to Florida 4-2 in semifinals.
- 2005–06: Lost to South Carolina 2-1 in first round.
- 2006–07: Lost to Florida 3-0 in first round.
- 2007–08: Lost to Gwinnett 3-0 in first round.
- 2008–09: Lost to South Carolina 4-2 in first round.
- 2009–10: Defeated Toledo 3-1 in first round; lost to Cincinnati 4-2 in quarterfinals.

== Team records ==
=== Single season ===
Goals: 48 (Russia) Sergei Berdnikov (1993–94)
Assists: 61 (United States) Matt Robbins (1994–95), (Canada) Scott King (2000–01), (United States) Kevin Hilton (2000–01)
Points: 101 (Canada) Scott King (2000–01)
Penalty Minutes: 352 (Canada) Eric Boulton (1996–97)
GAA: 2.43 (United States) Scott Meyer (2003–04)
SV%: .923 (United States) Scott Meyer (2003–04), (United States) Jeff Jakaitis (2008–09),
Wins: 32 (Canada) Nick Vitucci (1995–96)
Shutouts: 3 (United States) Scott Meyer (2003–04), (United States) Alex Westlund (2006–07)

- Goaltending records need a minimum 25 games played by the goaltender

=== Career ===
Career Goals: 174 (United States) Darryl Noren
Career Assists: 229 (United States) Darryl Noren
Career Points: 403 (United States) Darryl Noren
Career Penalty Minutes: 213 (Canada) Steve MacIntyre

== Notable players ==
List of Charlotte Checkers alumni who played over 25 games in the ECHL and 25 or more games in the National Hockey League.

- Andrei Bashkirov
- Sylvain Blouin
- Eric Boulton
- Kimbi Daniels
- Jason Dawe
- Mike Hartman
- Dwight Helminen
- Boyd Kane
- Jason LaBarbera
- Steve MacIntyre
- Corey Potter
- Dale Purinton
- Bryan Rodney
- André Roy
- Rob Tallas
- Craig Weller
- Peter Worrell

== Retired numbers ==
- 4 – Kurt Seher

Preceded by Richmond Renegades	Riley Cup Champions; 1995–96	Succeeded by South Carolina Stingrays
