= Yaroslav Chupris =

Belarusian ice hockey player

- Born: September 12, 1981 (age 43); Minsk, Belarusian SSR, USSR
- Height: 5 ft 10 in (178 cm)
- Weight: 201 lb (91 kg; 14 st 5 lb)
- Position: Left wing
- Played for: Shakhtyor Soligorsk; Yunost Minsk; Dinamo Minsk; Keramin Minsk; Salavat Yulaev Ufa; HK Minsk
- National team: Belarus
- Playing career: 1998–2017

Yaroslav Rostislavovich Chupris (Belarusian: Яраслаў Расціслававіч Чупрыс; born 12 September 1981) is a Belarusian former professional ice hockey winger. He participated at the 2010 IIHF World Championship with the Belarusan national team.
