= HC Dinamo Minsk =

Ice hockey team based in Minsk, Belarus

Dinamo Minsk
- Nickname: Zubry
- City: Minsk, Belarus
- League: KHL; 2008–present Belarusian Extraleague (2003–2008)
- Conference: Western
- Division: Tarasov
- Founded: 1948 (Dinamo), 2003 (Dinamo Minsk)
- Home arena: Minsk-Arena (capacity: 15,086)
- Colours
- Owner: BFSO Dinamo
- General manager: Oleg Antonenko
- Head coach: Sergei Brylin
- Captain: Chris Tierney
- Affiliates: Yunost Minsk (BLR); Dinamo-Shinnik Bobruysk (MHL)
- Website: hcdinamo.by

Franchise history
- 2003–present: HC Dinamo Minsk

Hockey Club Dinamo Minsk or HC Dinamo Minsk (Russian: Дина́мо-Минск; Belarusian: Дынама-Мінск, Dynama-Minsk) is a professional ice hockey club based in Minsk, Belarus. It is a member of the Tarasov Division in the Kontinental Hockey League (KHL).

Dinamo has qualified for the KHL playoffs (Gagarin Cup) nine times: in the 2010–11, 2011–12, 2014–15, 2016–17, 2020–21, 2021–22, 2022–23, 2023–24 and 2024–25 KHL seasons. The team has not won a single round in the Gagarin Cup playoffs, losing in all nine series in a combination of 2nd round and 1st round losses.

== History ==
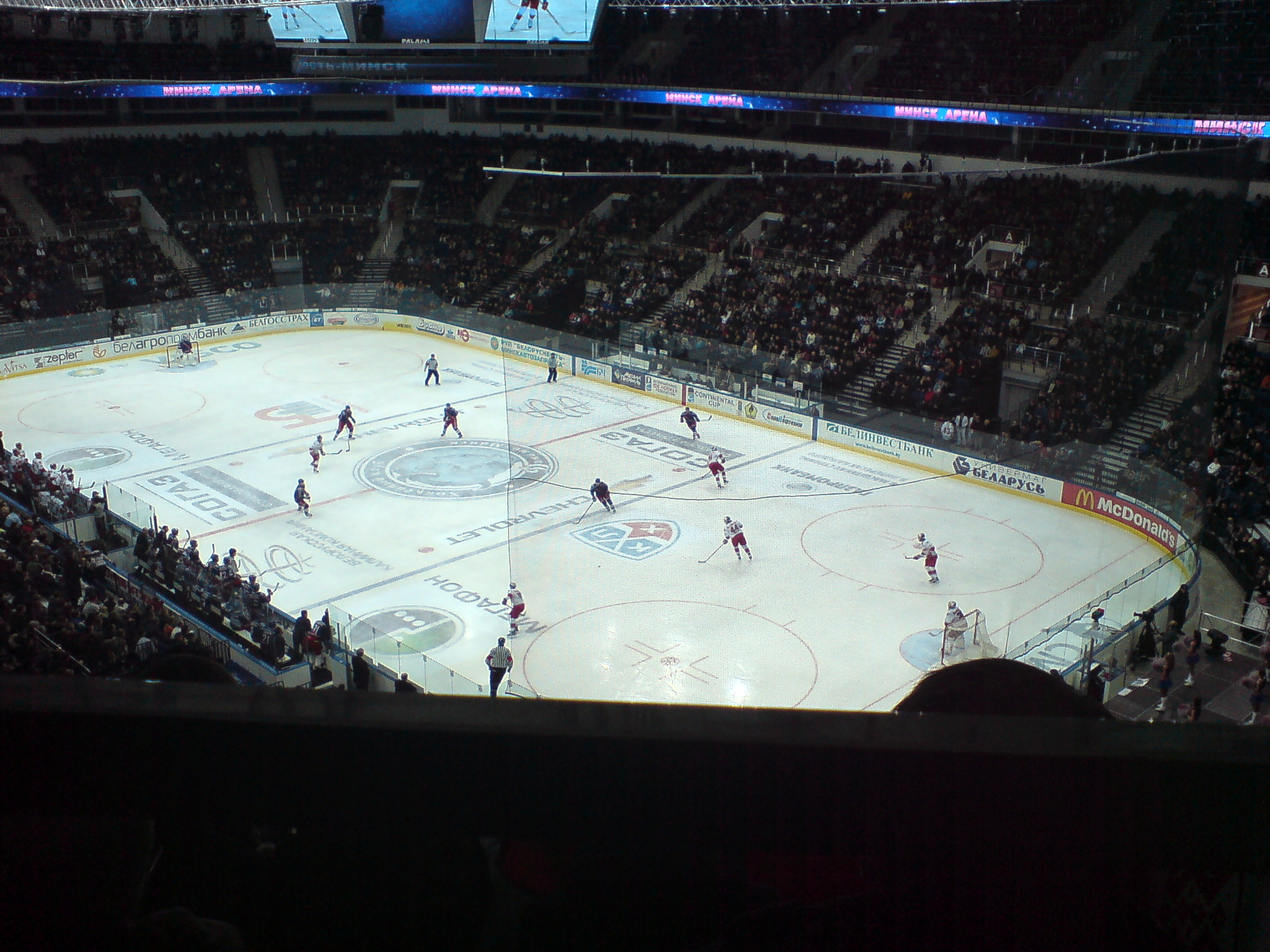
2010–11 IIHF Continental Cup played in Dinamo Minsk home arena

Dinamo was founded in 2003, taking the name of the Minsk club Dinamo, and won the Belarusian Extraleague championship title once and the Belarus Cup twice.

On 26 March 2008, the KHL confirmed the Belarusian club's inclusion in the Bobrov Division. Dinamo Minsk started to play on the ice of Minsk Palace of Sports and was relocated to the newly built Minsk-Arena in December 2009. The first head coach of the club was Paul Gardner, however he was dismissed prior to the beginning of the season. The next head coach became Jim Hughes, a protégé of previous Belarus national team head coach Curt Fraser. But after the first twelve games, the team was ranked next to the last place and Jim Hughes was dismissed. The new vacancy was taken by Russian specialist Vasili Spiridonov whose efforts were not enough to raise Dinamo Minsk from the bottom of the tournament table. The club ended the season ranked 22nd out of 24 teams.

The next season team began under command of Glen Hanlon, who brought the Belarus national team to the sixth place at WC2006 in Riga. The team roster was filled with world-famous players Ville Peltonen and Ossi Väänänen, and also one of the best Belarusian goaltenders Andrei Mezin. The 2009–10 season was similar to the previous one. The team did not show good result and Glen Hanlon was substituted by the head coach of HK Homiel. Dinamo Minsk finished at the 17th spot in the KHL while missing the playoffs, but still managed to win Spengler Cup under the guidance of Alexander Andrievsky.

The 2010–11 season was Dinamo Minsk's best season in the KHL. Marek Sýkora, who is widely thought of as one of the best coaches in the KHL, was appointed head coach. He brought Metallurg Magnitogorsk to the final games in 2005 and a rookie of the KHL Avtomobilist to the KHL playoffs in 2010. Dinamo Minsk under his command managed not only to get into the playoffs but was one step removed from the Western Conference semi-finals when Lokomotiv prevailed in the decisive game seven of the series.

The 2011–12 season of Dinamo Minsk was to have begun on 8 September 2011, versus Lokomotiv Yaroslavl. However, on 7 September 2011, the plane carrying the Lokomotiv team to the game in Minsk had crashed during takeoff, killing all but one of Lokomotiv's roster. Four days later, a memorial ceremony took place at the Minsk-Arena, with Minsk players paying tribute to the victims.

In the 2016–17 season, the assistant coach of the Belarus national team Craig Woodcroft, became the head coach of Dinamo Minsk. From the very beginning to the end of the regular season, the "Bisons" were in the playoff zone and breaking a number of club records. They first collected 105 points in a regular season and took eighth place in the general standings of the KHL. But in the playoffs, Dinamo did not succeed. Again, as six years ago, Lokomotiv Yaroslavl became the rival at the first stage. The series ended in five games, 4–1. Also during the season, in December 2016, Dinamo for the second time took part in the Spengler Cup.

Woodcroft had a three-year contract, but elected to leave the team in spring to head the Swiss club Genève-Servette HC. Gordie Dwyer was appointed head coach for the 2017–18 season. The roster had to be formed taking into account the financial difficulties that arose at the end of the previous season, so the team was weakened. Leaders like Ben Scrivens, Kevin Lalande, Raman Hrabarenka, Matt Ellison, Rob Klinkhammer, Sergei Kostitsyn, Andrei Stas and Nikita Komarov left. Instead of these players came mainly young Belarusians and four hockey players who had not previously played in the KHL - Jhonas Enroth, Quinton Howden, Justin Fontaine and Jack Skille. Some of them showed great performance: Enroth joined the Sweden national team to participate in the Olympics in Pyeongchang and became the best player of the season in the opinion of the fans, and Howden took the second place in the list of the team's top scorers. But in general, the season for Dinamo was unsuccessful: the team finished in the 10th place in the conference and did not qualify for the playoffs.

== Arenas ==
HC Dinamo Minsk called Minsk Sports Palace as their home until they moved to the new Minsk-Arena in 2010. In the 2024–25 KHL season, HC Dinamo Minsk drew the second-highest average home attendance with 14,446.

== Season-by-season KHL record ==
Note: GP = Games played, W = Wins, OTW = Overtime/shootout wins, L = Losses, OTL = Overtime/shootout losses, GF = Goals for, GA = Goals against, Pts = Points

Season	GP	W	OTW	L	OTL	Pts	GF	GA	Finish	Top scorer	Playoffs
2008–09	56	12	3	34	7	49	124	197	6th, Bobrov	Yaroslav Chupris (25 points: 9 G, 16 A; 52 GP)	Did not qualify
2009–10	56	17	6	31	2	65	139	164	6th, Bobrov	Geoff Platt (44 points: 26 G, 18 A; 56 GP)	Did not qualify
2010–11	54	17	8	22	7	74	150	155	4th, Tarasov	Konstantin Glazachev (35 points: 12 G, 23 A; 52 GP)	Lost in Conference Quarterfinals, 3-4 (Lokomotiv Yaroslavl)
2011–12	54	21	7	20	6	83	158	148	4th, Tarasov	Teemu Laine (42 points: 20 G, 22 A; 54 GP)	Lost in Conference Quarterfinals, 0-4 (Dynamo Moscow)
2012–13	52	18	6	23	5	71	125	148	5th, Tarasov	Tim Stapleton (40 points: 24 G, 16 A; 52 GP)	Did not qualify
2013–14	54	13	4	31	6	53	102	161	7th, Bobrov	Geoff Platt (29 points: 15 G, 14 A; 40 GP)	Did not qualify
2014–15	60	27	7	21	5	100	171	159	3rd, Bobrov	Charles Linglet (58 points: 22 G, 36 A; 54 GP)	Lost in Conference Quarterfinals, 1-4 (Jokerit)
2015–16	60	20	7	24	9	83	147	168	4th, Bobrov	Matt Ellison (55 points: 26 G, 29 A; 54 GP)	Did not qualify
2016–17	60	27	10	19	4	105	171	150	2nd, Bobrov	Matt Ellison (49 points: 16 G, 33 A; 54 GP)	Lost in Conference Quarterfinals, 1-4 (Lokomotiv Yaroslavl)
2017–18	56	20	5	28	3	73	112	129	4th, Bobrov	Marc-Andre Gragnani (35 points: 6 G, 29 A; 55 GP)	Did not qualify
2018–19	62	15	2	37	8	42	119	180	5th, Tarasov	Teemu Pulkkinen (29 points: 15 G, 14 A; 50 GP)	Did not qualify
2019–20	62	11	3	37	11	39	135	232	6th, Tarasov	Ryan Spooner (37 points: 10 G, 27 A; 43 GP)	Did not qualify
2020–21	60	17	15	25	3	67	167	174	4th, Tarasov	Shane Prince (49 points: 25 G, 24 A; 52 GP)	Lost in Conference Quarterfinals, 1-4 (SKA Saint Petersburg)
2021–22	47	18	5	16	8	54	138	144	5th, Tarasov	Taylor Beck (38 points: 8 G, 30 A; 42 GP)	Lost in Conference Quarterfinals, 0-4 (SKA Saint Petersburg)
2022–23	68	21	6	27	14	68	175	201	5th, Tarasov	Ryan Spooner (47 points: 19 G, 28 A; 64 GP)	Lost in Conference Quarterfinals, 2-4 (SKA Saint Petersburg)
2023–24	68	26	6	31	5	69	180	178	5th, Tarasov	Sam Anas (46 points: 21 G, 25 A; 60 GP)	Lost in Last 16, 2-4 (Dynamo Moscow)
2024–25	68	36	3	21	8	86	206	161	3rd, Tarasov	Vadim Shipachyov (57 points: 15 G, 42 A; 66 GP)	Lost in Quarterfinals, 1-4 (Traktor Chelyabinsk)
2025–26	68	33	6	19	10	88	247	173	2nd, Tarasov	Sam Anas (89 points: 32 G, 57 A; 67 GP)	Lost in Quarterfinals, 0-4 (Ak Bars Kazan)

== Players ==
=== Current roster ===
Updated 22 September 2026.

No.	Nat	Player	Pos	S/G	Age	Acquired	Birthplace
72	(Belarus)	Vladimir Alistrov	RW	L	25	2026	Mogilev, Belarus
7	(United States)	Sam Anas (A)	C	R	33	2023	Potomac, Maryland, United States
96	(Canada)	Nicolas Aubé-Kubel	RW	R	30	2026	Slave Lake, Alberta, Canada
68	(Belarus)	Bogdan Belkin	C	L	20	2025	Minsk, Belarus
28	(United States)	Jake Bischoff	D	L	32	2026	Grand Rapids, Minnesota, United States
27	(Canada)	Joshua Brook	D	R	27	2024	Roblin, Manitoba, Canada
37	(Belarus)	Arseni Chukhrayev	C	L	20	2026	Zhlobin, Belarus
94	(Russia)	Vasily Demchenko	G	L	32	2024	Chelyabinsk, Russia
60	(Canada)	Zach Fucale	G	L	31	2025	Laval, Quebec, Canada
97	(Russia)	Stanislav Galiyev	LW	R	34	2025	Moscow, Russia
22	(Canada)	Rhett Gardner	C	L	30	2026	Moose Jaw, Saskatchewan, Canada
40	(Russia)	Sergei Kalinin	RW	L	35	2026	Omsk, Russian SFSR
93	(Belarus)	Dmitri Kuzmin	D	L	23	2026	Kholstovo, Belarus
14	(Belarus)	Sergei Kuznetsov (A)	LW	R	24	2021	Zhlobin, Belarus
12	(United States)	Alex Limoges	LW	L	29	2025	Boulder, Colorado, United States
9	(Belarus)	Daniil Lipsky	C	L	21	2023	Minsk, Belarus
62	(Belarus)	Kirill Lozovsky	D	L	19	2026	Baranovichi, Belarus
33	(Canada)	Brady Lyle	D	R	27	2024	North Bay, Ontario, Canada
76	(Belarus)	Maxim Maltsev	C	L	22	2026	Arkhangelsk, Belarus
10	(Canada)	Nicolas Meloche	D	R	29	2024	LaSalle, Quebec, Canada
86	(Belarus)	Miroslav Mikhalyov	RW	L	23	2026	Minsk, Belarus
61	(Canada)	Xavier Ouellet (A)	D	L	33	2024	Bayonne, France
91	(Belarus)	Nikita Pyshkaylo	C	L	26	2021	Minsk, Belarus
24	(Canada)	Ty Smith	D	L	26	2025	Lloydminster, Alberta, Canada
26	(Belarus)	Daniil Sotishvili	RW	L	23	2022	Novopolotsk, Belarus
71	(Canada)	Chris Tierney (C)	C	L	32	2026	Keswick, Ontario, Canada
80	(Belarus)	Ilya Usov	C	L	25	2024	Minsk, Belarus
38	(Belarus)	Pavel Voronov	D	L	25	2025	Gomel, Belarus

== Franchise records and scoring leaders ==
=== KHL scoring leaders ===
These are the top-ten point-scorers in franchise history while being a KHL club. Figures are updated after each completed KHL regular season.

Note: Pos = Position; GP = Games played; G = Goals; A = Assists; Pts = Points; P/G = Points per game; = current Dinamo Minsk player

Points
Player	Pos	GP	G	A	Pts	P/G
(United States) Sam Anas	C	193	72	109	181	0.94
(Belarus) Geoff Platt	LW/C	260	87	83	170	0.65
(Canada) Matt Ellison	RW	166	66	95	161	0.97
(Belarus) Vitali Pinchuk	C	252	73	72	145	0.57
(Belarus) Andrei Stas	C	481	54	87	141	0.29
(Canada) Ryan Spooner	C	151	35	97	132	0.87
(Belarus) Charles Linglet	LW	221	45	80	125	0.57
(Russia) Roman Gorbunov	RW	261	59	65	124	0.47
(Belarus) Alexander Kulakov	LW/RW	376	51	62	113	0.30
(Belarus) Vadim Moroz	LW	222	56	53	109	0.49

Goals
Player	Pos	G
(Belarus) Geoff Platt	LW/C	87
(Belarus) Vitali Pinchuk	C	73
(United States) Sam Anas	C	72
(Canada) Matt Ellison	RW	66
(Russia) Roman Gorbunov	RW	59
(Belarus) Vadim Moroz	LW	56
(Belarus) Andrei Stas	C	54
(Belarus) Olexander Materukhin	RW	53
(Belarus) Dmitry Meleshko	RW	51
(Belarus) Alexander Kulakov	LW	51

Assists
Player	Pos	A
(United States) Sam Anas	C	109
(Canada) Ryan Spooner	C	97
(Canada) Matt Ellison	RW	95
(Belarus) Andrei Stas	C	87
(Belarus) Geoff Platt	LW/C	83
(Belarus) Charles Linglet	LW	80
(Canada) Marc-André Gragnani	D	80
(Belarus) Vitali Pinchuk	C	72
(Russia) Vadim Shipachyov	C	69
(Russia) Roman Gorbunov	RW	65

=== Franchise records ===
==== Regular season Player Highs ====
- Most goals in a season: Sam Anas, 32 (2025–26)
- Most assists in a season: Sam Anas, 57 (2025–26)
- Most points in a season: Sam Anas, 89 (2025–26)
- Most penalty minutes in a season: Duvie Westcott, 146 (2009–10)
- Most points in a season, defenseman: Ty Smith, 46 (2025–26)
- Most points in a game: Jonathan Cheechoo, 5 (vs. Jokerit, September 4, 2014, 3 goals and 2 assists)
- Most powerplay goals in a season: Geoff Platt, (2009–10), Jonathan Cheechoo, (2014-15) - tied with 10
- Most shorthanded goals in a season: Ilya Dokshin (2008–09), Geoff Platt (2009–10), Alexander Kulakov (2010–11), Zbyněk Irgl (2011–12), Andrei Stas (2011–12), Zbyněk Irgl (2013–14), Matt Ellison (2014–15), Jonathan Cheechoo (2014–15) - all tied with 2
- Most wins in a season, Goaltender: Zach Fucale, 22 (2025–26)
- Most shutouts in a season: Vasily Demchenko (2024–25), Zach Fucale (2025-26) - tied with 5
- Highest plus-minus in a season: Robert Hamilton - +35 (2025–26)

==== Playoffs ====
- Most goals in a playoff season: Yegor Borikov, 7 (2024–25)
- Most assists in a playoff season: Vitali Pinchuk, 6 (2024–25)
- Most points in a playoff season: Vitali Pinchuk, 11 (2024–25)
- Most penalty minutes in a playoff season: Jordan Henry, 33 (2010–11)
- Most points in a playoff season, defenseman: Peter Podhradský, 8 (2010–11)
- Most points in a game, playoff: 3, shared by 5 players

==== Hat-tricks ====
1. Dmitry Meleshko, 11-21-2010 at Metallurg Magnitogorsk - needed 43.26 to complete the feat
2. Zbyněk Irgl, 11-22-2011 at Barys Astana - needed 31.48 to complete the feat
3. Jonathan Cheechoo, 09-04-2014 at Jokerit - needed 42.54 to complete the feat
4. Jonathan Cheechoo, 10-24-2014 at Yugra Khanty-Mansiysk - needed 26.09 to complete the feat
5. Matt Ellison, 10-03-2015 at Avangard Omsk - needed 17.05 to complete the feat
6. Matt Ellison, 10-05-2015 at Barys Astana - needed 21.45 to complete the feat
7. Rob Klinkhammer, 10-23-2016 at Sochi - needed 39.52 to complete the feat
8. Quinton Howden, 10-02-2017 at Dinamo Moscow - needed 43.45 to complete the feat

== Honours ==
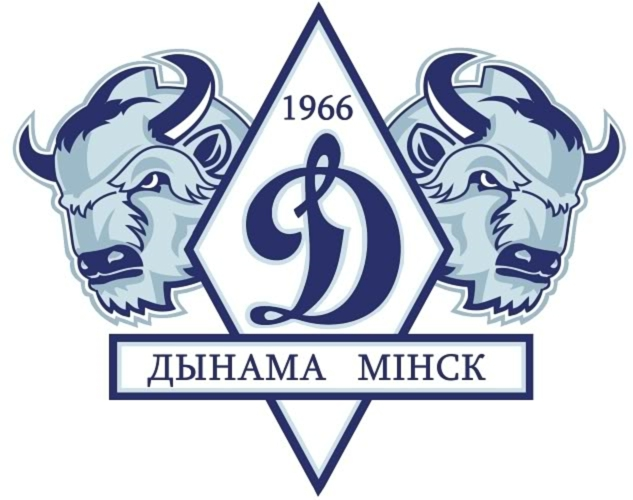
Dynamo Minsk former logo

=== Champions ===
Belarus

- Belarusian Extraleague (5): 1993–94, 1994–95, 1995–96, 1999–2000, 2006–07
- Belarus Cup (3): 2005, 2006, 2009

(Byelorussian Soviet Socialist Republic) BSSR

- BSSR League (2): 1967–68, 1969–70

Europe

- Spengler Cup (1): 2009

Belarus

- Memorial Salei: (1): 2014

=== Runners-up ===
- Belarusian Extraleague (3): 1996, 1996–97, 2005–06
- BSSR League (1): 1968–69
- Nadezhda Cup (KHL) (1): 2013–14
