= Jan Košťál =

Czech ice hockey player

- Born: 13 April 1980 (age 46) Karlovy Vary, Czechoslovakia
- Height: 6 ft 0 in (183 cm)
- Weight: 196 lb (89 kg; 14 st 0 lb)
- Position: Forward
- Shoots: Right
- Czech Extraliga team: HC Karlovy Vary
- Playing career: 1999–present

Jan Košťál (born 13 April 1980 in Karlovy Vary) is a Czech professional ice hockey player. He played with HC Karlovy Vary in the Czech Extraliga during the 2010–11 Czech Extraliga season. In 2013, he signed for English Premier League side Swindon Wildcats.
