= Martin St. Amour =

Canadian ice hockey player

- Born: January 30, 1970 (age 56) Montreal, Quebec, Canada
- Height: 6 ft 3 in (191 cm)
- Weight: 194 lb (88 kg; 13 st 12 lb)
- Position: Left wing
- Shot: Left
- Played for: Ottawa Senators
- NHL draft: 34th overall, 1988; Montreal Canadiens
- Playing career: 1990–2003

Martin St. Amour (born January 30, 1970) is a Canadian former professional ice hockey player who played as a left winger in one National Hockey League game for the Ottawa Senators during the 1992–93 NHL season. The rest of his career, which lasted from 1990 to 2003, was spent in various minor leagues. He is also a former head coach of the San Diego Gulls of the ECHL.

== Career ==
=== Amateur ===
St. Amour played junior hockey with the Laval-Laurentides-Lanaudiere Regents of the Quebec Midget AAA Hockey League. In his final season of junior hockey in 1986–87, he was considered the top prospect in the league and expected to be drafted first in the Quebec Major Junior Hockey League (QMJHL)'s amateur draft. He won the league's scoring title that year. He was selected first overall in the QMJHL's draft in May 1987 by the league's last place team, the Verdun Junior Canadiens ahead of Martin Gélinas, who was selected second by the Hull Olympiques and François Leroux by the Saint-Jean Castors with the third overall pick. In June, he was invited to Canada's under-18 tryout camp, but was cut from the team early, reportedly due to his attitude. In his first season of major junior hockey in 1987–88, St. Amour scored 20 goals, 50 assists for 70 points in 61 games as Verdun failed to move out of last place in the league.

In his second season with Verdun in 1988–89, St. Amour suffered a torn ligaments in his left shoulder and a displaced collarbone in a game against the Saint-Jean Castors on October 30, 1988. He returned to the lineup two weeks later against the Castors on November 16, but re-aggravated the injury in the game and left after the first period. The shoulder injury would bother him for the rest of the year. At the QMJHL's Christmas break in December, St. Amour was among the players singled out by Verdun's general manager Jacques Lemaire as having disappointed during the season and stated that changes to the roster would come in the new year. On January 8, 1989, St. Amour was traded to the Trois-Rivières Draveurs in exchange for Éric Charron and a sixth-round draft pick in the QMJHL draft. (Note: The deal was later reported as St. Amour and a draft choice were traded to the Draveurs for Charron and centre Eric Bellerose.) He appeared in 28 games, scoring 19 goals and 36 points, with Verdun before the trade. In Trois-Rivières, he added another eight goals and 29 points in 21 games. The Draveurs finished as the top team in the league during the regular season and advanced to the QMJHL playoffs. They faced the eighth-place Shawinigan Cataractes in the first round. However, the Draveurs were upset by the Cataractes, with St. Amour adding one goal and three points in four games.

In his first full season in Trois-Rivières in 1989–90, St. Amour exploded offensively. Placed on a line with Steve Larouche and Eric St-Amant, St. Amour was leading the league in scoring into December. As a result of his excellent play, he was named the Canadian Hockey League (CHL)'s player of the month for December, the first player from outside to the Western Hockey League (WHL) to win the award that season. In January 1990, he was selected to play with the QMJHL All-Stars in the annual All-Star Challenge alongside teammate Larouche. He ended the regular season with 57 goals and 136 points in 60 regular season games, finishing fourth in league scoring. The Draveurs finished in second place in the league and qualified for the 1990 QMJHL playoffs, facing the Saint-Hyacinthe Laser in the opening round. The Draveurs were upset again in the first round, losing in seven games to the Laser. In the series, St. Amour scored seven goals and 16 points. He was the QMJHL's plus/minus award winner with a +64 for the 1989–90 season, and was nominated for the CHL's plus/minus award that was ultimately won by Len Barrie of the WHL.

=== Professional ===
In his first year of eligibility for the National Hockey League's (NHL) entry draft, St. Amour was rated among those who could go in the second round. Gélinas and Leroux, who were selected behind him in the QMJHL draft, were considered better prospects for the NHL. St. Amour was selected in the second round, 34th overall, in the 1988 NHL entry draft by the Montreal Canadiens. The second-round pick was acquired by Montreal in a trade with the Buffalo Sabres for defenceman Tom Kurvers. He attended Montreal's training camp in September 1989 but was returned to his junior team before the season began. After his team was eliminated from the playoffs in April 1990, St. Amour was recalled to Montreal's American Hockey League (AHL) affiliate, the Sherbrooke Canadiens, which were in the midst of their quarterfinal series against the Halifax Citadels in the 1990 Calder Cup playoffs. Sherbrooke eliminated Halifax before advancing to the north final versus the Springfield Indians. The Canadiens were eliminated by the Indians in their best-of-seven series four games to two. St. Amour made one playoff appearance with Sherbrooke, going scoreless.

Ahead of the 1990–91 season, St. Amour attended Montreal's training camp, before being assigned to their new AHL affiliate, the Fredericton Canadiens to begin the season. In his rookie season in the AHL, St. Amour scored 13 goals and 29 points in 45 games with Fredericton, but missed time with a recurring back injury. Fredericton qualified for the 1991 Calder Cup playoffs, but St. Amour only managed to appear in one game, going scoreless. St. Amour was returned to Fredericton for the 1991–92 season in September 1991. However, a number of new players were brought to Fredericton by Montreal and St. Amour found himself among the players needing a new team. Fredericton's coach, Paulin Bordeleau, publicly called out his desire to be a better hockey player while Fredericton's general manager, Jacques Lemaire, was searching for a landing place for St. Amour. Ultimately, St. Amour accepted a buyout of his contract by Montreal in October and became a free agent.

St. Amour joined the Cincinnati Cyclones of the ECHL in October for the remainder of the 1991–92 season. Normally a left winger, St. Amour centered the second line, grouped with Shaun Clouston and Bobby Wallwork. St. Amour finished the season as the team's leading scorer, recording 44 goals and 88 points in 60 games with Cincinnati. The Cyclones qualified for the 1992 Riley Cup playoffs and faced the Dayton Bombers in the first round in a best-of-five series. After sweeping the Bombers in three games, Cincinnati moved on to face the Johnstown Chiefs in a best-of-three series. The Cyclones eliminated the Chiefs to advance to the West Division final against the Louisville IceHawks. However, they fell to the IceHawks in their best-of-five series 3 games to 1. St. Amour finished second in team scoring during the playoffs, recording four goals and 13 points in nine games.

In the offseason St. Amour signed a contract with the expansion Ottawa Senators of the NHL in August 1992. He attended Ottawa's training camp but was among the players assigned to the team's AHL affiliate, the New Haven Senators, on September 27 for the 1992–93 season. In April 1993, St. Amour was recalled by Ottawa on an emergency basis alongside Tony Cimellaro after injuries to forwards Darcy Loewen and Jody Hull. He made his NHL debut on April 4, 1993 against the Vancouver Canucks. In the second period, he was involved an altercation with the Canucks, taking a minor penalty for roughing alongside teammate Sylvain Turgeon, which was offset by roughing penalties to the Canucks' Gerald Diduck and Petr Nedvěd. The Senators lost the game 3–0. On April 7, St. Amour was returned to New Haven. He finished the season with New Haven, recording 21 goals and 60 points in 71 games, leading the team in scoring.

St. Amour was one of the players Ottawa left unprotected in the offseason, ahead of the 1993 NHL expansion draft. He was not selected, and in September he attended Ottawa's training camp. However, he was among the players assigned to their new AHL affiliate, the Prince Edward Island Senators in the first wave of cuts. He struggled offensively with the AHL Senators in the 1993–94 season, going a month without scoring a goal. However, after falling out of favour with his coach Don MacAdam, who openly criticized his players' commitment to play in late January 1994, St. Amour requested a trade. In 37 games with Prince Edward Island, St. Amour scored 13 goals and 25 points. Finding no partners, he was placed on waivers and released, after which he signed a 25-game tryout with the Providence Bruins of the AHL on February 10. In 12 games with Providence, he recorded three assists.

Unattached to any team, St. Amour went overseas and signed with the Whitley Warriors of the British Hockey League (BHL) in July 1994. He remained with Whitley until October when he was released and replaced by Brian Verbeek. He then briefly joined the Teesside Bombers, but was released before playing a game for them, after the team lacked the funds to pay him. In 1995 he returned to North America and played in the semi-professional leagues with the Moncton Labatt Ice of the Nova Scotia Senior Hockey League (NSSHL) beginning in February. However, the team was suspended by both the NSSHL and the New Brunswick Amateur Hockey Association after a payment for the transfer of St. Amour failed to clear and would not reinstate the team until proper funds were provided.

In the 1995 offseason he joined the San Diego Gulls of the West Coast Hockey League (WCHL) for their inaugural season in 1995–96. Frustrated with playing in the WCHL, he claimed he would likely retire if he did not get promoted to the International Hockey League (IHL) before the end of the season. In January 1996, he received a five-game tryout with the IHL's San Francisco Spiders, joining the team for a four-game road trip. He played in four games with San Francisco, recording two assists. He was offered a contract by San Francisco but turned it down as the terms did not meet his requirements. He returned to San Diego on January 25. On March 21, he signed a contract of the Long Beach Ice Dogs of the IHL and appeared in one game for them before returning to San Diego. The Gulls went on to finish top of the league in the regular season and St. Amour lead the league in goals and points. He finished the regular season with 61 goals and 109 points in 51 games. For his play, he was named a WCHL First Team All-Star. As the top team, the Gulls qualified for the playoffs and advanced to the final and won the Taylor Cup for the first time, defeating the Fresno Falcons. St. Amour six goals and 13 points in nine playoff games and finished as the playoff scoring leader.

In the offseason, he once again left for Europe, this time France, where he briefly joined the Gothiques d'Amiens, playing in seven games and scoring three goals and seven points. He returned to the Gulls for the 1996–97 season and was named captain. Playing alongside his brother Stephane, he led the league in scoring again, recording 60 goals and 127 points in 59 games. He was once again named a first-team all-star and named the league's most valuable player. The Gulls finished first in the league and advanced to the Taylor Cup finals where they beat the Anchorage Aces to win back-to-back championships. He signed a two-year contract with the Gulls in September 1997. In the 1997–98 season the Gulls advanced to the Taylor Cup finals versus the Tacoma Sabercats, which they won for the third consecutive time. St. Amour recorded 35 goals and 79 points in 61 games in the regular season and 11 goals and 18 points in 12 playoff games. In the 1998–99 season, St. Amour's scoring fell off as he marked only 15 goals and 46 points in 59 games. The Gulls made the playoffs and faced a rematch with the Sabercats in the final, but lost, ending their championship streak.

In the 1999–2000 season, St. Amour's playing time fell as he took over as head coach of the team after Steve Martinson was suspended, and then aggravated an injury near his pelvic bone that had been bothering him all season. He finished the season with six goals and 16 points in 23 games. While recovering from the injury he did colour commentary for the team's radio broadcast. He remained with the Gulls for the 2000–01 season, but suffered injuries that limited him to 14 games, in which he scored one goal and five points. He once again took over head coaching duties after the suspension of coach Martinson. However, on January 5, 2001, ahead of a game against the Tacoma Sabercats, St. Amour announced his retirement due to injuries. At the time of his retirement, he was the franchise's leading scorer. His jersey number, 18, was retired by the franchise, the second after Willie O'Ree, in a ceremony on February 20.

In the midst of the 2001–02 season, St. Amour came out of retirement to play for the Gulls on a short-term basis, donning the number 81 as his original number had been retired, due to injuries within the team. He appeared in 20 games, scoring two goals and ten points. St. Amour ended up returning to the ice to play again in the 2002–03 season after other players suffered injuries. He appeared in three games, registering two assists. For his actions against the Long Beach Ice Dogs in his final game for the Gulls on March 1, 2003, he was suspended for seven games. In 2003–04, he made a single appearance in the Central Hockey League for the Arizona Sundogs, going scoreless.

== Coaching career ==
St. Amour began coaching with the San Diego Gulls in the 1999–2000 season as a stopgap while the head coach, Steve Martinson, was suspended. He did so again in the following season for the same reason. After he retired in the midst of the season, he was added permanently to the Gulls' coaching staff as an assistant. The Gulls went on to capture the Taylor Cup that season in a victory over the Idaho Steelheads. In the offseason, he was made an associate coach in a retool of the Gulls' front office. The plan was for Martinson to guide St. Amour in coaching and then ahead of the 2002–03 season, but after injuries ravaged the team, St. Amour returned to the ice in November 2001. The Gulls advanced to the 2002 playoffs, but were eliminated in the second round.

In the 2002–03 season, St. Amour returned as an associate coach for the Gulls, with a short period as player. The Gulls advanced once again to the Taylor Cup finals and faced the Fresno Falcons in the final iteration of the championship. San Diego won its fifth and last Taylor Cup, as the WCHL merged with the ECHL at the end of the season. In the 2003–04 season, their first in the ECHL, St. Amour remained with the Gulls as an associate coach and continued to be Martinson's heir apparent as the head coach in San Diego. In February 2004, it was announced that Martinson would move on at the end of the season with St. Amour taking over. The Gulls finished first in the league and advanced to the 2004 Kelly Cup playoffs and faced the Alaska Aces in the first round. The Aces swept the Gulls in their best-of-five series to end the Gulls first season in the ECHL.

St. Amour took over as head coach of the San Diego Gulls ahead of the 2004–05 season and had a record of 35 wins, 29 losses and 8 overtime losses, but failed to make the playoffs. In his second year as head coach in the 2005–06 season he stepped away in January due to an illness in his family and his assistants, Jamie Black and B. J. MacPherson, shared head coach duties, while he remained as general manager. The team ended the regular season with a record of 34 wins, 30 losses and 8 overtime losses, but made the playoffs, losing in the first round. However, the team suffered through a plague of injuries with over 50 players appearing for the team. In July 2006, the team ceased operations.

== Career statistics ==
=== Regular season and playoffs ===
			Regular season					Playoffs
Season	Team	League	GP	G	A	Pts	PIM	GP	G	A	Pts	PIM
1986–87	Laval Regents	QMAAA	42	55	95	150	58	8	8	15	23	16
1987–88	Verdun Junior Canadiens	QMJHL	61	20	50	70	111	—	—	—	—	—
1988–89	Verdun Junior Canadiens	QMJHL	28	19	17	36	87	—	—	—	—	—
1988–89	Trois-Rivieres Draveurs	QMJHL	26	8	21	29	69	4	1	2	3	0
1989–90	Trois-Rivieres Draveurs	QMJHL	60	57	79	136	162	7	7	9	16	19
1989–90	Sherbrooke Canadiens	AHL	—	—	—	—	—	1	0	0	0	0
1990–91	Fredericton Canadiens	AHL	45	13	16	29	51	1	0	0	0	0
1991–92	Cincinnati Cyclones	ECHL	60	44	44	88	183	9	4	9	13	18
1992–93	Ottawa Senators	NHL	1	0	0	0	2	—	—	—	—	—
1992–93	New Haven Senators	AHL	71	21	39	60	78	—	—	—	—	—
1993–94	PEI Senators	AHL	37	13	12	25	65	—	—	—	—	—
1993–94	Providence Bruins	AHL	12	0	3	3	22	—	—	—	—	—
1994–95	Whitley Warriors	BHL	2	1	1	2	16	—	—	—	—	—
1994–95	Moncton Labatt Ice	NSSHL	—	—	—	—	—	—	—	—	—	—
1995–96	San Francisco Spiders	IHL	4	0	2	2	6	—	—	—	—	—
1995–96	Los Angeles Ice Dogs	IHL	1	0	0	0	0	—	—	—	—	—
1995–96	San Diego Gulls	WCHL	53	61	48	109	182	9	6	7	13	10
1996–97	Amiens	FRA	7	3	4	7	12	—	—	—	—	—
1996–97	San Diego Gulls	WCHL	59	60	67	127	170	8	8	4	12	23
1997–98	San Diego Gulls	WCHL	61	35	44	79	203	12	11	7	18	28
1998–99	San Diego Gulls	WCHL	59	15	31	46	176	12	2	7	9	18
1999–00	San Diego Gulls	WCHL	23	6	10	16	80	—	—	—	—	—
2000–01	San Diego Gulls	WCHL	14	1	4	5	45	—	—	—	—	—
2001–02	San Diego Gulls	WCHL	20	2	8	10	39	—	—	—	—	—
2002–03	San Diego Gulls	WCHL	3	0	2	2	32	—	—	—	—	—
2003–04	Arizona Sundogs	CHL	1	0	0	0	0	—	—	—	—	—
WCHL totals			292	180	214	394	927	41	27	25	52	79
NHL totals			1	0	0	0	0	—	—	—	—	—

== See also ==
- List of players who played only one game in the NHL
