= Stu Kulak =

Canadian ice hockey player

- Born: March 10, 1963 (age 63) Edmonton, Alberta, Canada
- Height: 5 ft 10 in (178 cm)
- Weight: 180 lb (82 kg; 12 st 12 lb)
- Position: Right wing
- Shot: Right
- Played for: Vancouver Canucks; Edmonton Oilers; New York Rangers; Quebec Nordiques; Winnipeg Jets
- NHL draft: 115th overall, 1981; Vancouver Canucks
- Playing career: 1982–2000

Stuart Alan Kulak (born March 10, 1963) is a Canadian former professional ice hockey right wing who spent parts of four seasons in the National Hockey League between 1982 and 1989. Selected by the Vancouver Canucks in the 1981 NHL entry draft, he played for the Canucks, Edmonton Oilers, New York Rangers, Quebec Nordiques, and Winnipeg Jets, as well as several teams in the minor leagues.

== Playing career ==
Kulak was born in Edmonton, Alberta. He was selected in the third round, 115th overall, by the Vancouver Canucks in the 1981 NHL entry draft from the Victoria Cougars of the WHL. He would make his debut for the team at the age of just 19 in the 1982–83 season, appearing in 4 games and registering a goal and an assist. Considered one of the team's top prospects at this point, his career would go awry the following year when he suffered a serious abdominal injury, which required surgery and forced him to miss almost two seasons.

In 1986–87, Kulak would crack the Canucks' roster out of training camp, appearing in 21 games before being waived and claimed by the Edmonton Oilers. He would be dealt again before the end of the season, this time to the New York Rangers. In what would prove to be his only full NHL season, Kulak registered 4 goals and 2 assists in 54 games between Vancouver, Edmonton, and New York.

Kulak would have stints with the Quebec Nordiques and Winnipeg Jets over the next two seasons, but failed to stick full-time. Released by the Jets in 1990, he would spend most of the 1990s in low-end minor pro before finally retiring in 2000.

Kulak appeared in 90 NHL games, registering 8 goals and 4 assists for 12 points, along with 130 penalty minutes.

== Career statistics ==
=== Regular season and playoffs ===
			Regular season					Playoffs
Season	Team	League	GP	G	A	Pts	PIM	GP	G	A	Pts	PIM
1979–80	Sherwood Park Crusaders	AJHL	53	30	23	53	111	—	—	—	—	—
1979–80	Victoria Cougars	WHL	3	0	0	0	0	—	—	—	—	—
1980–81	Victoria Cougars	WHL	72	23	24	47	43	15	3	5	8	19
1981–82	Victoria Cougars	WHL	71	38	50	88	92	4	1	2	3	43
1982–83	Victoria Cougars	WHL	50	29	33	62	130	10	10	9	19	29
1982–83	Vancouver Canucks	NHL	4	1	1	2	0	—	—	—	—	—
1983–84	Fredericton Express	AHL	52	12	16	28	55	5	0	0	0	59
1985–86	Kalamazoo Wings	IHL	30	14	8	22	38	2	2	0	2	0
1985–86	Fredericton Express	AHL	3	1	0	1	0	6	2	1	3	0
1986–87	Vancouver Canucks	NHL	28	1	1	2	37	—	—	—	—	—
1986–87	Edmonton Oilers	NHL	23	3	1	4	41	—	—	—	—	—
1986–87	New York Rangers	NHL	3	0	0	0	0	3	0	0	0	2
1987–88	Quebec Nordiques	NHL	14	1	1	2	28	—	—	—	—	—
1987–88	Moncton Hawks	AHL	37	9	12	21	58	—	—	—	—	—
1988–89	Winnipeg Jets	NHL	18	2	0	2	24	—	—	—	—	—
1988–89	Moncton Hawks	AHL	51	30	29	59	98	10	5	6	11	16
1989–90	Moncton Hawks	AHL	56	14	23	37	72	—	—	—	—	—
1990–91	Kansas City Blades	IHL	47	13	28	41	20	—	—	—	—	—
1992–93	Erie Panthers	ECHL	21	13	8	21	23	—	—	—	—	—
1992–93	Tilburg Trappers	NED	16	11	16	27	44	—	—	—	—	—
1993–94	Tulsa Oilers	CHL	59	17	29	46	101	8	0	0	0	28
1994–95	San Antonio Iguanas	CHL	65	30	38	68	97	13	3	3	6	36
1995–96	Reno Renegades	WCHL	43	16	25	41	60	3	1	1	2	0
1996–97	Reno Renegades	WCHL	36	12	18	30	60	—	—	—	—	—
1996–97	New Mexico Scorpions	WPHL	5	0	0	0	0	6	1	1	2	8
1997–98	Reno Rage	WCHL	63	16	25	41	54	3	3	2	5	4
1998–99	Tucson Gila Monsters	WCHL	21	8	15	23	16	—	—	—	—	—
1998–99	Phoenix Mustangs	WCHL	20	3	15	18	18	—	—	—	—	—
1998–99	Fresno Falcons	WCHL	9	5	6	11	8	7	2	2	4	6
1999–00	Austin Ice Bats	WPHL	42	4	10	14	16	—	—	—	—	—
NHL totals			70	8	4	12	130	3	0	0	0	2
