= Serge Roy (ice hockey) =

Canadian ice hockey player

- Born: June 25, 1962 (age 63) Sept-Îles, Quebec, Canada
- Height: 5 ft 9 in (175 cm)
- Weight: 190 lb (86 kg; 13 st 8 lb)
- Position: Defence
- Shot: Right
- Played for: Elitserien; Skellefteå AIK; AHL; Nova Scotia Voyageurs; Adirondack Red Wings; IHL; Fort Wayne Komets; Phoenix Roadrunners; CoHL; Brantford Smoke; WCHL; San Diego Gulls; Fresno Falcons; Austria; VEU Feldkirch
- National team: Canada
- NHL draft: Undrafted
- Playing career: 1983–1999

Serge Roy (born June 25, 1962) is a Canadian retired professional ice hockey defenceman and Olympian.

Roy played with Team Canada at the 1988 Winter Olympics held in Calgary, Alberta.

== Career statistics ==
=== Regular season and playoffs ===
			Regular season					Playoffs
Season	Team	League	GP	G	A	Pts	PIM	GP	G	A	Pts	PIM
1979–80	Laval Voisins	QMJHL	23	4	3	7	13	—	—	—	—	—
1983–84	Nova Scotia Voyageurs	AHL	5	0	2	2	0	—	—	—	—	—
1985–86	Canadian National Team	Intl	67	8	34	42	53	—	—	—	—	—
1986–87	Skellefteå HC	SEL	24	2	2	4	14	—	—	—	—	—
1986–87	Canadian National Team	Intl	16	1	2	3	14	—	—	—	—	—
1987–88	Canadian National Team	Intl	66	3	38	41	70	—	—	—	—	—
1987–88	Adirondack Red Wings	AHL	9	0	1	1	0	5	1	2	3	9
1988–89	Genève–Servette HC	SUI.2	28	6	16	22	33	—	—	—	—	—
1989–90	Fort Wayne Komets	IHL	19	1	4	5	13	—	—	—	—	—
1990–91	Canadian National Team	Intl	5	0	2	2	4	—	—	—	—	—
1990–91	Phoenix Roadrunners	IHL	7	1	4	5	25	—	—	—	—	—
1991–92	Brantford Smoke	CoHL	11	2	9	11	16	—	—	—	—	—
1991–92	Fort Wayne Komets	IHL	34	6	5	11	40	—	—	—	—	—
1992–93	VEU Feldkirch	AUT	19	5	10	15	0	—	—	—	—	—
1995–96	San Diego Gulls	WCHL	63	9	46	55	61	8	0	2	2	14
1996–97	San Diego Gulls	WCHL	45	8	22	30	48	6	1	1	2	4
1997–98	San Diego Gulls	WCHL	56	7	27	34	76	3	0	0	0	6
1998–99	San Diego Gulls	WCHL	15	4	10	14	11	—	—	—	—	—
1998–99	Fresno Falcons	WCHL	12	1	6	7	8	7	0	4	4	6
Intl totals			154	12	76	88	141	—	—	—	—	—
IHL totals			60	8	13	21	78	—	—	—	—	—
WCHL totals			191	29	111	140	204	24	1	7	8	30

=== International ===
Year	Team	Event	GP	G	A	Pts	PIM
1988	Canada	OG	5	0	7	7	4
Senior totals			5	0	7	7	4
