= Jarret Zukiwsky =

Canadian ice hockey player

- Born: December 7, 1972 (age 53) Pincher Creek, Alberta, Canada
- Height: 5 ft 10 in (178 cm)
- Weight: 185 lb (84 kg; 13 st 3 lb)
- Position: Winger
- Shot: Left
- Played for: ECHL; Mobile Mysticks; Baton Rouge Kingfish; CHL; San Antonio Iguanas; Corpus Christi IceRays; WCHL; Anchorage Aces; Idaho Steelheads; San Diego Gulls; Fresno Falcons; Europe; HC Fassa; Nottingham Panthers
- NHL draft: Undrafted
- Playing career: 1997–2003

Jarret Zukiwsky (born December 7, 1972) is a Canadian former professional ice hockey player. During a professional career that spanned seven seasons and five different leagues, Zukiwsky played 200 regular season games scoring 77 goals and 153 points while racking up 747 minutes in penalties.

== Awards and honours ==
Award	Year
Clare Drake Award – CIS Rookie of the year	1993–94

== Career statistics ==
			Regular season					Playoffs
Season	Team	League	GP	G	A	Pts	PIM	GP	G	A	Pts	PIM
1989–90	Victoria Cougars	WHL	67	7	8	15	100	--	--	--	--	--
1990–91	Victoria Cougars	WHL	17	4	8	12	23	--	--	--	--	--
1990–91	Kamloops Blazers	WHL	39	6	10	16	114	12	2	3	5	56
1991–92	Kamloops Blazers	WHL	10	0	5	5	74	--	--	--	--	--
1991–92	Moose Jaw Warriors	WHL	42	9	7	16	227	4	1	1	2	13
1992–93	Moose Jaw Warriors	WHL	44	29	27	56	113	--	--	--	--	--
1993–94	U. of Lethbridge	CWUAA	46	49	42	91	111
1994–95	U. of Lethbridge	CWUAA	35	41	26	67	172
1995–96	U. of Lethbridge	CWUAA	41	41	32	73	122
1996–97	U. of Lethbridge	CWUAA	29	26	14	40	110
1996–97	Mobile Mysticks	ECHL	5	2	1	3	14	2	1	0	1	0
1997–98	Fassa HC	Italy-A	35	38	17	55	127
1998–99	Nottingham Panthers	BISL	34	9	19	28	119
1999-00	San Antonio Iguanas	CHL	28	7	12	19	112	--	--	--	--	--
1999-00	Anchorage Aces	WCHL	16	6	1	7	72	4	0	4	4	34
2000–01	Anchorage Aces	WCHL	35	7	18	25	154	--	--	--	--	--
2001–02	Baton Rouge Kingfish	ECHL	11	3	2	5	16	--	--	--	--	--
2001–02	Corpus Christi Icerays	CHL	16	3	3	6	58	--	--	--	--	--
2002–03	Idaho Steelheads	WCHL	2	1	0	1	16	--	--	--	--	--
2002–03	San Diego Gulls	WCHL	2	0	0	0	6	--	--	--	--	--
2002–03	Anchorage Aces	WCHL	7	0	2	2	30	--	--	--	--	--
2002–03	Fresno Falcons	WCHL	9	1	1	2	28	2	0	0	0	2
