= Chad Wagner =

Canadian ice hockey player

- Born: November 12, 1974 (age 51) Calgary, Alberta, Canada
- Height: 6 ft 5 in (196 cm)
- Weight: 225 lb (102 kg; 16 st 1 lb)
- Position: Right wing
- Shot: Right
- Played for: WCHL; San Diego Gulls; IHL; Las Vegas Thunder; ECHL; Dayton Bombers; San Diego Gulls; AHL; Cincinnati Mighty Ducks; UHL; Asheville Smoke; Danbury Trashers
- NHL draft: Undrafted
- Playing career: 1995–2006

Chad Wagner (born November 12, 1974) is a Canadian former professional ice hockey enforcer.

While playing with the San Diego Gulls, Wagner was the most penalized player in the West Coast Hockey League for three consecutive years: during the 1996–97 season he received 503 penalty minutes in 45 games played; in 1997–98 he recorded 439 minutes over 34 games; and over the course of the 1998–99 campaign he was given 521 minutes in 43 games played to set the WCHL record for most penalty minutes in a single season.

On February 25, 2005, while playing with the Danbury Trashers, Wagner received a lifetime suspension from the United Hockey League when, instead of entering the penalty box, he broke free from a linesman to grab Adirondack Frostbite coach Marc Potvin.
