= Bruce Shoebottom =

Canadian ice hockey player

- Born: August 20, 1963 (age 62) Windsor, Ontario, Canada
- Height: 6 ft 2 in (188 cm)
- Weight: 200 lb (91 kg; 14 st 4 lb)
- Position: Defence
- Shot: Left
- Played for: Boston Bruins
- NHL draft: 47th overall, 1983; Los Angeles Kings
- Playing career: 1985–1998; 2002–2003

Bruce Shoebottom (born August 20, 1963) is a Canadian former professional ice hockey player who played 35 games in the National Hockey League for the Boston Bruins between 1988 and 1990. The rest of his career, which lasted from 1985 to 1998, was spent in various minor leagues.

== Biography ==
Shoebottom was born in Windsor, Ontario. As a youth, he played in the 1978 Quebec International Pee-Wee Hockey Tournament with a minor ice hockey team from Mississauga.

Shoebottom scored his only regular-season NHL goal on April 1, 1989, in Boston's 5–4 victory over the Quebec Nordiques.

He played for the San Diego Gulls in the 1990s.

== Career statistics ==
=== Regular season and playoffs ===
			Regular season					Playoffs
Season	Team	League	GP	G	A	Pts	PIM	GP	G	A	Pts	PIM
1980–81	Toronto Nationals U18 AAA	U18 AAA	40	10	32	42	—	—	—	—	—	—
1981–82	Peterborough Petes	OHL	51	0	4	4	67	—	—	—	—	—
1982–83	Peterborough Petes	OHL	34	2	10	12	106	—	—	—	—	—
1983–84	Peterborough Petes	OHL	16	0	5	5	73	—	—	—	—	—
1984–85	Peterborough Petes	OHL	60	2	15	17	143	17	0	4	4	26
1985–86	New Haven Nighthawks	AHL	6	2	0	2	12	—	—	—	—	—
1985–86	Binghamton Whalers	AHL	62	7	5	12	249	—	—	—	—	—
1986–87	Fort Wayne Komets	IHL	75	2	10	12	309	10	0	0	0	31
1987–88	Boston Bruins	NHL	3	0	1	1	0	4	1	0	1	42
1987–88	Maine Mariners	AHL	70	2	12	14	338	—	—	—	—	—
1988–89	Boston Bruins	NHL	29	1	3	4	44	10	0	2	2	35
1988–89	Maine Mariners	AHL	44	0	8	8	265	—	—	—	—	—
1989–90	Boston Bruins	NHL	2	0	0	0	4	—	—	—	—	—
1989–90	Maine Mariners	AHL	66	3	11	14	228	—	—	—	—	—
1990–91	Boston Bruins	NHL	1	0	0	0	5	—	—	—	—	—
1990–91	Maine Mariners	AHL	71	2	8	10	238	1	0	0	0	14
1991–92	Peoria Rivermen	IHL	79	4	12	16	234	10	0	0	0	33
1992–93	Rochester Americans	AHL	65	7	5	12	253	14	0	0	0	19
1993–94	Oklahoma City Blazers	CHL	43	4	11	15	236	1	0	0	0	14
1994–95	Rochester Americans	AHL	1	0	0	0	0	—	—	—	—	—
1995–96	San Diego Gulls	WCHL	22	1	7	8	102	9	0	2	2	17
1996–97	San Diego Gulls	WCHL	38	6	6	12	288	2	0	0	0	24
1997–98	Austin Ice Bats	WPHL	9	0	4	4	37	4	0	0	0	14
2002–03	Garaga de Saint-Georges	QSPHL	1	0	0	0	5	—	—	—	—	—
AHL totals			385	27	48	75	1583	15	0	0	0	33
NHL totals			35	1	4	5	53	14	1	2	3	77

== Bibliography ==
- Diamond, Dan, ed. (2002), Total Hockey: The Official Encyclopedia of the National Hockey League, Second Edition, New York: Total Sports Publishing, ISBN 1-892129-85-X
