= Steve Martinson =

American ice hockey player and coach (born 1959)

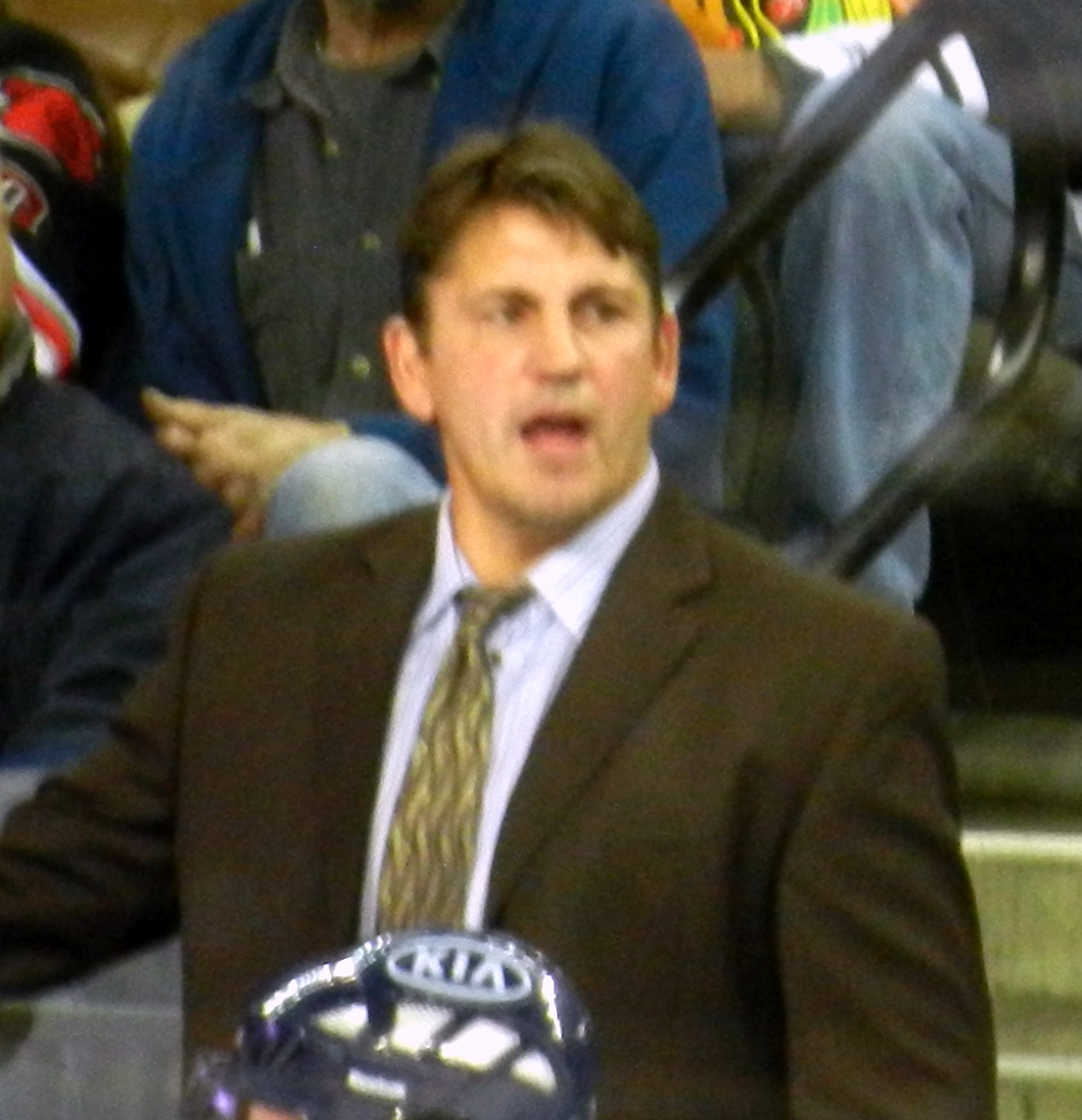
- Martinson coaching the Chicago Express during the 2011–12 season.
- Born: June 21, 1959 (age 67) Minnetonka, Minnesota, U.S.
- Height: 6 ft 1 in (185 cm)
- Weight: 200 lb (91 kg; 14 st 4 lb)
- Position: Right wing
- Shot: Left
- Played for: Detroit Red Wings; Montreal Canadiens; Minnesota North Stars
- NHL draft: Undrafted
- Playing career: 1981–1996

Stephen Paul Martinson (born June 21, 1959) is an American former professional ice hockey player and coach. He played 49 games in the National Hockey League with the Detroit Red Wings, Montreal Canadiens, and Minnesota North Stars between 1987 and 1992. The rest of his playing career, which lasted from 1981 to 1996, was spent in various minor leagues. After retiring as a player he turned to coaching, and his 1,123 career professional coaching wins are the most ever for an American born ice hockey head coach.

== Playing career ==
Martinson's college career includes playing the 1977–78 and 1978–79 seasons with the St. Cloud State Huskies. Between 1981 and 1986, he played in the International Hockey League and Central Hockey League for the Toledo Goaldiggers (IHL), Salt Lake Golden Eagles (IHL), Birmingham South Stars (CHL), and the Tulsa Oilers (CHL). While with the Tulsa Oilers in the 1983–84 season, the team suspended operations on February 16, 1984, playing only road games for the final six weeks of the season. Despite this adversity, the team went on to win the league's championship, the Adams Cup, his only championship as a player.

After playing parts of the next four seasons in the American Hockey League, mostly with the Hershey Bears and Adirondack Red Wings, Martinson played his first National Hockey League game, with the Detroit Red Wings, in the 1987–88 season. Martinson went on to play fifty NHL games with the Red Wings, Montreal Canadiens, and Minnesota North Stars over parts of four seasons while mostly playing with those teams' AHL or IHL affiliates. He retired early into the 1994–95 season, although he made a few more on-ice appearances early into his coaching career with the Fresno Falcons and San Diego Gulls (WCHL).

== Coaching career ==
Martinson's first head coaching job was with the San Diego Gulls of the West Coast Hockey League in 1995. Martinson was hired as the team's first head coach after playing for the former Gulls team that played in the IHL. He had immediate success in the newly formed league and the WCHL Gulls won the first three league championships, the Taylor Cup, in 1996, 1997, and 1998. He coached the Gulls for nine of the team's eleven seasons, winning two more Taylor Cups, in 2001 and 2003.

After one season of coaching the Gulls after the team joined the ECHL in 2003, Martinson left the organization to become the head coach of the Rockford IceHogs in the United Hockey League in 2004. He stayed with the IceHogs for three seasons, winning the league championship in 2007.

Martinson then left the IceHogs after the championship season to become the head coach of the Elmira Jackals in their first season in the ECHL in 2007. With the Jackals, his teams qualified for the playoffs every season following multiple years of no postseasons before he was hired.

In 2010, Martinson left the Jackals to become the inaugural head coach of the expansion Chicago Express in the ECHL. However, the Express did not take the ice until 2011 would end up only playing one season in 2011–12.

After the Express folded in 2012, Martinson became the head coach of the Allen Americans in the Central Hockey League. His teams once again had immediate success winning the 2013 and 2014 Ray Miron President's Cup for the CHL's playoff championships. The Americans joined the ECHL in 2014 and continued to have success, winning the league championship Kelly Cup after their first two seasons, in 2015 and 2016. Martinson's contract was not renewed by Allen following the 2021-22 season.

Over his multi-stop coaching career Martinson won a total of ten championships in four North American ice hockey leagues, including five with the Gulls (1996, 1997, 1998, 2001, 2003) in the West Coast Hockey League, four with the Americans in the Central Hockey League (2013, 2014) and the ECHL (2015, 2016), along with one with the IceHogs in the United Hockey League (2007). Martinson is the first American-born coach to win 1,000 games as a head coach, having completed the 2021-22 season with 1,123 wins.

On June 27, 2024, Martinson was named as head coach of the Federal Prospects Hockey League expansion team, the Athens Rock Lobsters, in their inaugural season, leading them to the 2024 FPHL playoffs while winning Coach of the Year award. On May 12, 2025, it was announced that Martinson would rejoin the Americans and take up his old job as head coach and GM.

== Post-coaching career ==
On October 21, 2023, Rockford IceHogs, now of the American Hockey League, announced Martinson would one of the first three inductees into the team's Ring of Honor. On October 25, 2023, the IceHogs then announced that Martinson would join the broadcast team for select games during the 2023-24 season.

== Career statistics ==
=== Regular season and playoffs ===
			Regular season					Playoffs
Season	Team	League	GP	G	A	Pts	PIM	GP	G	A	Pts	PIM
1977–78	St. Cloud State University	NCAA-II	—	—	—	—	—	—	—	—	—	—
1978–79	St. Cloud State University	NCAA-II	—	—	—	—	—	—	—	—	—	—
1979–80	St. Cloud State University	NCAA-II	—	32	21	53	—	—	—	—	—	—
1980–81	St. Cloud State University	NCAA-II	31	19	21	40	57	—	—	—	—	—
1981–82	Toledo Goaldiggers	IHL	35	12	18	30	128	—	—	—	—	—
1982–83	Toledo Goaldiggers	IHL	32	9	10	19	111	—	—	—	—	—
1982–83	Birmingham South Stars	CHL	43	4	5	9	184	13	1	2	3	80
1983–84	Tulsa Oilers	CHL	42	3	6	9	240	6	0	0	0	43
1984–85	Toledo Goaldiggers	IHL	54	4	10	14	300	2	0	0	0	21
1985–86	Hershey Bears	AHL	69	3	6	9	432	3	0	0	0	56
1986–87	Hershey Bears	AHL	17	0	3	3	85	—	—	—	—	—
1986–87	Adirondack Red Wings	AHL	14	1	1	2	78	11	2	0	2	108
1987–88	Detroit Red Wings	NHL	10	1	1	2	84	—	—	—	—	—
1987–88	Adirondack Red Wings	AHL	32	6	8	14	146	6	1	2	3	66
1988–89	Montreal Canadiens	NHL	25	1	0	1	87	1	0	0	0	10
1988–89	Sherbrooke Canadiens	AHL	10	5	7	12	61	—	—	—	—	—
1989–90	Montreal Canadiens	NHL	13	0	0	0	64	—	—	—	—	—
1989–90	Sherbrooke Canadiens	AHL	37	6	20	26	113	—	—	—	—	—
1990–91	San Diego Gulls	IHL	53	16	24	40	268	—	—	—	—	—
1991–92	Minnesota North Stars	NHL	1	0	0	0	9	—	—	—	—	—
1991–92	San Diego Gulls	IHL	70	18	15	33	279	4	1	1	2	15
1992–93	San Diego Gulls	IHL	10	0	4	4	55	—	—	—	—	—
1994–95	Houston Aeros	IHL	6	0	1	1	30	—	—	—	—	—
1994–95	Fresno Falcons	SuHL	1	0	0	0	2	—	—	—	—	—
1995–96	San Diego Gulls	WCHL	1	0	0	0	0	—	—	—	—	—
IHL totals			260	59	82	141	1171	6	1	1	2	36
NHL totals			49	2	1	3	244	1	0	0	0	10
