= Colorado Gold Kings =

Minor league ice hockey team

- City: Colorado Springs, Colorado; Fairbanks, Alaska (1975–1997)
- Operated: 1975–2002
- Home arena: Colorado Springs World Arena; Big Dipper Ice Arena (1995–1997)
- Colors: Navy blue, gold, white

Franchise history
- 1975–1977: Alaska Teamsters
- 1977–1997: Alaska Gold Kings
- 1998–2002: Colorado Gold Kings

Championships
- Regular season titles: 0
- Division titles: 0
- Taylor Cups: 0

The Colorado Gold Kings, previously known as the Alaska Gold Kings, were an American professional minor league ice hockey team based in Fairbanks, Alaska, and later Colorado Springs, Colorado. The Gold Kings were members of the West Coast Hockey League.

== History ==
=== Amateur and semi-professional days (1975–1995) ===
Alaska Gold Kings logo, 1995

The Gold Kings were founded in 1975 as an amateur senior ice hockey team in Fairbanks as the Alaska Teamsters. The Teamsters hockey team were the brainchild of Gary Atwood, father of hockey playing sons, and then head of the Fairbanks Teamsters Local 959. Wanting a higher level of ice hockey for local youth to aspire to, and to provide Fairbanks with a sports institution that could compete with Anchorage, Atwood helped form the team in 1975. In 1977, the stockholders met and formed the Fairbanks Gold Kings. The name was created by Joe Jackovich of Jackovich Tractors and Equipment Co. in homage to the gold mining history of Fairbanks, the Alaska Goldpanners baseball team, and his favorite NHL team the Los Angeles Kings. The team's name was again later changed to the Alaska Gold Kings. Between 1983 and 1995 the Gold Kings won five national championships at the senior men's level, and routinely played the powerhouse teams from the Lower 48 and Canada.

From the 1980s until 1994 the Gold Kings played primarily as members of the semi-professional Pacific Southwest Hockey League (PSHL). While in Fairbanks the Gold Kings once hosted their own international tournament, the Alaska Cup, facing the likes of Team Japan and Team Austria. They also were the American representatives in the 1990 Tournoi du Mont-Blanc, a traditional tournament played around Christmas in several French Alps resorts. During the 1994–95 season the Gold Kings played in the short-lived Pacific Hockey League, winning the league's only championship.

=== WCHL Alaska Gold Kings (1995–1997) ===
In 1995, the Gold Kings along with two other former PHL teams, the Fresno Falcons and Anchorage Aces (now Alaska Aces) became members of the newly formed professional West Coast Hockey League. The Alaska Gold Kings made their only WCHL playoff appearance during the inaugural 1995–96 season, losing in the first round to the eventual champion San Diego Gulls. The team suspended operations after a last place finish in 1996–97 and did not play in the 1997–98 season.

=== Colorado Gold Kings (1998–2002) ===
In 1998, the Gold Kings relocated to Colorado Springs and became the Colorado Gold Kings. In its four seasons in Colorado the team fared better than it did in Alaska by qualifying for the postseason every year, but still failed to move past the second round of the playoffs. The Colorado Gold Kings folded after the 2001–02 season.

== Season-by-season record ==
Note: GP = Games played, W = Wins, L = Losses, OTL = Overtime losses, SOL = Shootout losses, Pts = Points, GF = Goals for, GA = Goals against, PIM = Penalties in minutes

Final records.

Season	League	GP	W	L	OTL	SOL	Pts	GF	GA	PIM	Finish	Coach	Playoffs
1995–96	WCHL	58	23	25	-	10	56	256	307	1020	4th, WCHL	Wayne Sawchuk	Lost in round 1, 2-3 (San Diego)
1996–97	WCHL	64	13	47	-	4	30	230	423	1722	6th, WCHL	Brad McCaughey	Missed playoffs
1997–98	WCHL	Did not play											
1998–99	WCHL	71	32	33	-	6	70	270	288	2233	3rd, North	Kirk Tomlinson	Lost in round 1, 1-2 (Anchorage)
1999–00	WCHL	72	37	31	-	4	78	264	276	1926	2nd, North	Kirk Tomlinson	Lost in round 2, 0-3 (Tacoma)
2000–01	WCHL	72	42	21	-	4	93	311	250	1934	2nd, North	Kirk Tomlinson	Lost in round 2, 0-3 (Idaho)
2001–02	WCHL	72	39	26	-	7	85	253	221	1863	2nd, North	Allen Pedersen	Lost in round 1, 2-3 (Tacoma)
