= Trevor Converse =

Canadian ice hockey player

- Born: February 4, 1970 (age 56) North Battleford, Saskatchewan, Canada
- Height: 6 ft 1 in (185 cm)
- Weight: 210 lb (95 kg; 15 st 0 lb)
- Position: Right wing
- Shot: Right
- Played for: Baltimore Bandits; Colorado Gold Kings; Fort Worth Brahmas; Fort Worth Fire; Fresno Falcons; Hershey Bears; Johnstown Chiefs; Mobile Mysticks; Phoenix Mustangs; Richmond Renegades; San Antonio Iguanas; San Diego Gulls; Thunder Bay Thunder Hawks; Wichita Thunder
- NHL draft: undrafted
- Playing career: 1991–2000

Trevor Converse (born February 4, 1970) is a Canadian retired professional ice hockey player who spent ten seasons in the minor leagues. Converse played 312 games with fifteen different teams from 1991 until 2000, where he finished his career with the Wichita Thunder. He also attended Edmonton Oilers training camp as a free agent in 1991.

After his retirement in 2000, Converse was named the Assistant Coach of the Topeka Roadrunners. Converse is currently the Director Of Player Personnel for the El Paso Rhinos, a Junior "A" Tier III team based in El Paso, Texas.

== Awards and accomplishments ==
- 1991-92: Colonial Cup winner (Thunder Bay Thunder Hawks)
