= Serge Roy =

Serge Roy may refer to:

- Serge Roy (footballer) (1932–2025), French footballer
- Serge Roy (ice hockey) (born 1962), Canadian ice hockey player
