= 2000–01 WCHL season =

The 2000–01 West Coast Hockey League season was the sixth season of the West Coast Hockey League, a North American minor professional league. Nine teams participated in the regular season, and the San Diego Gulls were the league champions.

== Teams ==
2000-01 West Coast Hockey League
| Division | Team | City | Arena |
| North | Anchorage Aces | Anchorage, Alaska | Sullivan Arena |
| North | Colorado Gold Kings | Colorado Springs, Colorado | Colorado Springs World Arena |
| North | Idaho Steelheads | Boise, Idaho | Bank of America Centre |
| North | Tacoma Sabercats | Tacoma, Washington | Tacoma Dome |
| South | Bakersfield Condors | Bakersfield, California | Centennial Garden |
| South | Fresno Falcons | Fresno, California | Selland Arena |
| South | Long Beach Ice Dogs | Long Beach, California | Long Beach Sports Arena |
| South | Phoenix Mustangs | Phoenix, Arizona | Arizona Veterans Memorial Coliseum |
| South | San Diego Gulls | San Diego, California | San Diego Sports Arena |

=== Map of teams ===
North Division South Division

== Regular season ==
| Northern Division | GP | W | L | OTL | GF | GA | Pts |
|---|---|---|---|---|---|---|---|
| Idaho Steelheads | 72 | 47 | 21 | 4 | 293 | 244 | 98 |
| Colorado Gold Kings | 72 | 42 | 21 | 9 | 311 | 250 | 93 |
| Tacoma Sabercats | 72 | 31 | 35 | 6 | 236 | 247 | 68 |
| Anchorage Aces | 72 | 27 | 41 | 4 | 264 | 324 | 58 |

| Southern Division | GP | W | L | OTL | GF | GA | Pts |
|---|---|---|---|---|---|---|---|
| San Diego Gulls | 72 | 50 | 17 | 5 | 263 | 192 | 105 |
| Fresno Falcons | 72 | 44 | 22 | 6 | 259 | 221 | 94 |
| Long Beach Ice Dogs | 72 | 41 | 20 | 11 | 265 | 215 | 93 |
| Bakersfield Condors | 72 | 26 | 36 | 10 | 220 | 273 | 62 |
| Phoenix Mustangs | 72 | 21 | 48 | 3 | 213 | 333 | 45 |

== Taylor Cup-Playoffs ==
Taylor Cup-Quarterfinals
S1 | San Diego Gulls | 3
S4 | Bakersfield Condors | 0
S2 | Fresno Falcons | 2
S3 | Long Beach Ice Dogs | 3
N1 | Idaho Steelheads | 3
N4 | Anchorage Aces | 0
N2 | Colorado Gold Kings | 3
N3 | Tacoma Sabercats | 2

Taylor Cup-Semifinals
S1 | San Diego Gulls | 3
S3 | Long Beach Ice Dogs | 0
N1 | Idaho Steelheads | 3
N2 | Colorado Gold Kings | 0

Taylor Cup-Final
S1 | San Diego Gulls | 4
N1 | Idaho Steelheads | 3
