= Stefan Grogg =

Swiss ice hockey player

- Born: February 16, 1974 Langenthal, Switzerland
- Height: 6 ft 1 in (185 cm)
- Weight: 207 lb (94 kg; 14 st 11 lb)
- Position: Forward
- Shot: Left
- Played for: NLA; HC Fribourg-Gottéron; EV Zug; SC Langnau Tigers; NLB; EHC Biel; WCHL; San Diego Gulls; Anchorage Aces
- National team: Switzerland
- Playing career: 1993–2007

Stefan Grogg (born February 16, 1974) is a Swiss former professional hockey forward who played ice and inline hockey professionally in Switzerland and the United States. Grogg began his career playing for EHC Grindelwald youth team. He signed with HC Fribourg-Gottéron in 1993. Two years later Grogg moved to the U.S. and joined WCHL teams San Diego Gulls and Anchorage Aces. That same season (1995/96) he also played inline hockey for the San Diego Barracudas, a member of Roller Hockey International, the first major professional league for inline hockey.

Returning to Switzerland, Grogg joined EV Zug, which during that season (1997/98) won their only National League championship. His performance earned him a place on the Swiss National Team 1997, which finished 15th in the World Championships (3rd in Pool B). In 1998 Grogg was one of Switzerland's top scorers in the National League playoffs. On the inline rink, Grogg went to the 2006 XII FIRS Inline Hockey World Championship (Detroit MI) with the Swiss National Team (LNA). Switzerland came in fourth, losing the Bronze medal to Canada, despite two goals scored late in the game by Grogg. With over 500 NLA games to his credit, Grogg retired in 2007. He achieved an ice hockey career total of 97 goals and 162 assists in regular season and playoff games, his final team, EHC Biel, were Swiss NLB League Champions 2006/07.

== Stats ==
Season	Team	League	Regular season					Playoffs				
Season	Team	League	GP	G	A	Pts	PIM	GP	G	A	Pts	PIM
1993-94	HC Fribourg-Gottéron	NLA	34	2	0	2	0	11	0	0	0	0
1994-95	EHC Biel	NLA	27	2	2	4	8	3	1	1	2	6
1995-96	San Diego Gulls	WCHL	3	0	0	0	2	--	--	--	--	--
1995-96	Anchorage Aces	WCHL	7	1	4	5	10	--	--	--	--	--
1996-97	EV Zug	NLA	44	7	13	20	69	6	1	0	1	4
1996-97	Switzerland	WC(B)	--	--	--	--	--	7	2	3	5	29
1997-98	EV Zug	NLA	40	9	20	29	25	14	3	5	8	4
1998-99	EV Zug	NLA	45	10	10	20	38	11	6	7	13	6
1999-00	EV Zug	NLA	43	11	14	25	48	11	2	4	6	14
2000-01	EV Zug	NLA	44	5	18	23	99	4	0	1	1	6
2001-02	EV Zug	NLA	44	3	7	10	62	6	0	1	1	4
2002-03	SC Langnau Tigers	NLA	30	5	13	18	44	--	--	--	--	--
2003-04	SC Langnau Tigers	NLA	40	2	2	4	93	--	--	--	--	--
2004-05	SC Langnau Tigers	NLA	25	0	1	1	10	--	--	--	--	--
2005-06	SC Langnau Tigers	NLA	13	0	0	0	8	--	--	--	--	--
2006-07	EHC Biel	NLB	36	5	6	11	20	--	--	--	--	--
