= 2003–04 ECHL season =

Ice hockey league season

- League: ECHL
- Sport: Ice hockey

Regular season
- Brabham Cup: San Diego Gulls
- Season MVP: Scott Stirling (Atlantic City)
- Top scorer: Tim Smith (Columbia)

Playoffs
- Eastern champions: Florida Everblades
- Eastern runners-up: Reading Royals
- Western champions: Idaho Steelheads
- Western runners-up: Gwinnett Gladiators
- Playoffs MVP: Dan Ellis (Idaho)

Finals
- Champions: Idaho Steelheads
- Runners-up: Florida Everblades

ECHL seasons
- ← 2002–03 2004–05 →

The 2003–04 ECHL season was the 16th season of the ECHL. This was the first season that the league would be known as only the ECHL instead of East Coast Hockey League after the absorption of the former West Coast Hockey League teams. The Brabham Cup regular season champions were the San Diego Gulls and the Kelly Cup playoff champions were the Idaho Steelheads.

== League changes ==
This season brought a major change in the ECHL as the Board of Governors approved membership applications from the Anchorage Aces, the Bakersfield Condors, the Fresno Falcons, the Idaho Steelheads, the Las Vegas Wranglers, the Long Beach Ice Dogs and the San Diego Gulls from the recently defunct West Coast Hockey League. In a change reflective of the nationwide presence, the East Coast Hockey League changed its name to simply ECHL on May 19, 2003.

During the 2003 off-season, the Richmond Renegades, Arkansas RiverBlades, Jackson Bandits, Baton Rouge Kingfish, and Lexington Men O' War all ceased operations.

In addition to the former WCHL teams, the league also added two reactivated franchises in the Gwinnett Gladiators (formerly the Mobile Mysticks) and Texas Wildcatters (formerly the Huntington Blizzard).

== All-Star Game ==
The ECHL All-Star Game was held at Carver Arena in Peoria, Illinois, and was hosted by the Peoria Rivermen. The Eastern Conference All-Stars defeated the Western Conference All-Stars 7–6, with Peoria's Randy Rowe named Most Valuable Player.

== Regular season ==
=== Final standings ===
Note: GP = Games played; W = Wins; L= Losses; OTL = Overtime or Shootout losses; GF = Goals for; GA = Goals against; Pts = Points
Green shade = Clinched playoff spot; Blue shade = Clinched division; (z) = Clinched home-ice advantage

==== Eastern Conference ====
Northern Division	GP	W	L	OTL	PTS	GF	GA
Wheeling Nailers (z)	72	51	17	4	106	259	188
Atlantic City Boardwalk Bullies	72	47	19	6	100	242	159
Peoria Rivermen	72	45	18	9	99	244	177
Johnstown Chiefs	72	45	20	7	97	223	195
Reading Royals	72	37	25	10	84	212	189
Trenton Titans	72	37	28	7	81	222	193
Dayton Bombers	72	26	41	5	57	187	271
Toledo Storm	72	23	38	11	57	183	258
Cincinnati Cyclones	72	25	43	4	54	175	223

Southern Division	GP	W	L	OTL	PTS	GF	GA
Columbia Inferno	72	44	20	8	96	275	217
Roanoke Express	72	38	26	8	84	219	232
Florida Everblades	72	37	25	10	84	239	221
South Carolina Stingrays	72	39	28	5	83	205	202
Greensboro Generals	72	40	30	2	82	241	240
Charlotte Checkers	72	31	32	9	71	206	230
Florence Pride	72	30	33	9	69	210	254
Greenville Grrrowl	72	14	53	5	33	177	281

==== Western Conference ====
Central Division	GP	W	L	OTL	PTS	GF	GA
Louisiana IceGators	72	48	22	2	98	235	167
Mississippi Sea Wolves	72	45	20	7	97	256	200
Gwinnett Gladiators	72	42	22	8	92	248	193
Pensacola Ice Pilots	72	40	23	9	89	240	239
Columbus Cottonmouths	72	37	27	8	82	214	197
Augusta Lynx	72	32	33	7	71	203	234
Texas Wildcatters	72	22	44	6	50	196	287

Pacific Division	GP	W	L	OTL	PTS	GF	GA
San Diego Gulls (z)	72	49	13	10	108	240	177
Las Vegas Wranglers	72	43	22	7	93	227	186
Idaho Steelheads	72	40	23	9	89	219	208
Alaska Aces	72	38	28	6	82	220	210
Bakersfield Condors	72	25	38	9	59	201	236
Fresno Falcons	72	23	43	6	52	187	275
Long Beach Ice Dogs	72	23	44	5	51	191	257

=== Scoring leaders ===
Note: GP = Games played; G = Goals; A = Assists; Pts = Points; PIM = Penalty Minutes

Player	Team	GP	G	A	Pts
Tim Smith	CBA	69	33	62	95
Steffon Walby	MS	59	33	55	88
Brian McCullough	FL	72	40	47	87
Louis Dumont	MS	72	33	51	84
Louis Goulet	AUG	72	32	52	84
Mark Pederson	SD	70	44	37	81
Sylvai Deschatelets	SD	72	24	57	81
Mark Turner	GBO	72	28	50	78
Cory Neilson	PEN	72	19	59	78
Jon Cullen	AC	71	29	48	77

=== Leading goaltenders ===
Note: GP = Games played; Mins = Minutes played; W = Wins; L = Losses; T = Ties; GA = Goals allowed; SO = Shutouts; SV% = Save percentage; GAA = Goals against average

Player	Team	GP	Mins	W	L	T	GA	SO	Sv%	GAA
Scott Stirling	AC	49	2954	31	13	5	94	4	.933	1.91
Derek Gustafson	LA	43	2498	28	14	0	87	5	.927	2.09
Michael Garnett	GWT	33	1936	21	10	2	69	4	.926	2.14
Trever Koenig	SD	53	3154	37	7	8	114	3	.920	2.17
Mike Valley	PEO	37	2184	20	8	7	83	3	.915	2.28

== Kelly Cup playoffs ==
=== Bracket ===
Northern Division Wildcard
N4	Johnstown	0
N5	Reading	1
Eastern Conference
Western Conference

Division Semifinals
N1	Wheeling	2
N5	Reading	3
N2	Atlantic City	1
N3	Peoria	3
S1	Columbia	1
S4	South Carolina	3
S2	Roanoke	1
S3	Florida	3
C1	Louisiana	3
C4	Pensacola	2
C2	Mississippi	2
C3	Gwinnett	3
P1	San Diego	0
P4	Alaska	3
P2	Las Vegas	2
P3	Idaho	3

Division Finals
N5	Reading	3
N3	Peoria	1
S4	South Carolina	0
S2	Florida	3
C1	Louisiana	1
C3	Gwinnett	3
P4	Alaska	1
P3	Idaho	3

Conference Finals
N5	Reading	2
S3	Florida	3
C3	Gwinnett	1
P3	Idaho	3

Kelly Cup Final
S3	Florida	1
P3	Idaho	4

=== Eastern Conference ===
==== 1st round ====
Northern Division Wildcard Johnstown vs. Reading
Date	Away	Home
April 5	Reading 2	Johnstown 1
Reading wins series 1–0

==== Division Semifinals ====
Northern Division Semifinals Wheeling vs. Reading
Date	Away	Home
April 8	Reading 1	Wheeling 3
April 9	Reading 3	Wheeling 2
April 10	Wheeling 3	Reading 4
April 13	Wheeling 3	Reading 1
April 14	Reading 4	Wheeling 0
Reading wins series 3–2

Northern Division Semifinals Atlantic City vs. Peoria
Date	Away	Home	
April 7	Peoria 2	Atlantic City 3	
April 9	Peoria 6	Atlantic City 3	
April 12	Atlantic City 1	Peoria 2	2OT
April 13	Atlantic City 1	Peoria 2	OT
Peoria wins series 3–1

Southern Division Semifinals Columbia vs. South Carolina
Date	Away	Home	
April 6	South Carolina 1	Columbia 4	
April 9	South Carolina 4	Columbia 2	
April 10	Columbia 2	South Carolina 3	OT
April 13	Columbia 0	South Carolina 3	
South Carolina wins series 3–1

Southern Division Semifinals Roanoke vs. Florida
Date	Away	Home	
April 6	Florida 4	Roanoke 3	
April 8	Florida 6	Roanoke 3	
April 9	Roanoke 5	Florida 3	
April 12	Roanoke 2	Florida 3	OT
Florida wins series 3–1

==== Division finals ====
Northern Division Finals Peoria vs. Reading
Date	Away	Home	
April 17	Reading 2	Peoria 1	OT
April 19	Reading 2	Peoria 4	
April 21	Peoria 2	Reading 3	
April 22	Peoria 1	Reading 3	
Reading wins series 3–1

Southern Division Finals Florida vs. South Carolina
Date	Away	Home	
April 17	South Carolina 3	Florida 6	
April 19	South Carolina 1	Florida 2	2OT
April 22	Florida 8	South Carolina 2	
Florida wins series 3–0

==== Conference finals ====
Eastern Conference Finals Florida vs. Reading
Date	Away	Home
April 28	Reading 0	Florida 1
April 30	Reading 3	Florida 5
May 2	Florida 0	Reading 6
May 5	Florida 1	Reading 4
May 10	Reading 2	Florida 3
Florida wins series 3–2 and Gingher Memorial Trophy

=== Western Conference ===
==== Division Semifinals ====
Central Division Semifinals Louisiana vs. Pensacola
Date	Away	Home	
April 7	Pensacola 4	Louisiana 8	
April 8	Pensacola 0	Louisiana 6	
April 10	Louisiana 1	Pensacola 2	OT
April 13	Louisiana 1	Pensacola 3	
April 14	Pensacola 1	Louisiana 2	2OT
Louisiana wins series 3–2

Central Division Semifinals Gwinnett vs. Mississippi
Date	Away	Home	
April 7	Gwinnett 2	Mississippi 1	OT
April 9	Gwinnett 3	Mississippi 4	
April 10	Mississippi 3	Gwinnett 6	
April 12	Mississippi 3	Gwinnett 0	
April 14	Gwinnett 2	Mississippi 1	OT
Gwinnett wins series 3–2

Pacific Division Semifinals San Diego vs. Alaska
Date	Away	Home	
April 6	Alaska 4	San Diego 2	
April 7	Alaska 4	San Diego 3	OT
April 9	San Diego 1	Alaska 5	
Alaska wins series 3–0

Pacific Division Semifinals Las Vegas vs. Idaho
Date	Away	Home	
April 6	Idaho 2	Las Vegas 4	
April 9	Idaho 2	Las Vegas 3	
April 10	Las Vegas 0	Idaho 2	
April 13	Las Vegas 3	Idaho 4	OT
April 14	Idaho 3	Las Vegas 0	
Idaho wins series 3–2

==== Division finals ====
Central Division Finals Louisiana vs. Gwinnett
Date	Away	Home	
April 16	Gwinnett 1	Louisiana 3	
April 17	Gwinnett 2	Louisiana 1	
April 21	Louisiana 2	Gwinnett 3	
April 22	Louisiana 5	Gwinnett 6	2OT
Gwinnett wins series 3–1

Pacific Division Finals Idaho vs. Alaska
Date	Away	Home	
April 16	Alaska 4	Idaho 3	OT
April 17	Alaska 1	Idaho 4	
April 20	Idaho 4	Alaska 1	
April 21	Idaho 3	Alaska 2	
Idaho wins series 3–1

==== Conference finals ====
Western Conference Finals Gwinnett vs. Idaho
Date	Away	Home
April 27	Idaho 5	Gwinnett 3
April 28	Idaho 1	Gwinnett 3
May 1	Gwinnett 1	Idaho 3
May 5	Gwinnett 2	Idaho 5
Idaho wins series 3–1 and Bruce Taylor Trophy

=== Kelly Cup finals ===
Florida vs. Idaho
Date	Away	Home	
May 14	Idaho 5	Florida 1	
May 15	Idaho 6	Florida 4	
May 19	Florida 0	Idaho 1	OT
May 21	Florida 3	Idaho 2	OT
May 22	Florida 2	Idaho 5	
Idaho wins series 4–1 and Kelly Cup

== ECHL awards ==
Patrick Kelly Cup:	Idaho Steelheads
Henry Brabham Cup:	San Diego Gulls
Gingher Memorial Trophy:	Florida Everblades
Bruce Taylor Trophy:	Idaho Steelheads
John Brophy Award:	Pat Bingham (Wheeling)
CCM TACKS Most Valuable Player:	Scott Stirling (Atlantic City)
Kelly Cup Playoffs Most Valuable Player:	Dan Ellis (Idaho)
Reebok Hockey Goaltender of the Year:	Scott Stirling (Atlantic City)
CCM Tacks Rookie of the Year:	Kevin Doell (Gwinnett)
Defenseman of the Year:	Corey Neilson (Pensacola)
Leading Scorer:	Tim Smith (Columbia)
Reebok Hockey Plus Performer Award:	Tim Smith (Columbia)
Sportsmanship Award:	Mark Pederson (San Diego)

== See also ==
- List of ECHL seasons
- 2003 in sports
- 2004 in sports
