= 2001–02 WCHL season =

The 2001-02 West Coast Hockey League season was the seventh season of the West Coast Hockey League, a North American minor professional league. Eight teams participated in the regular season, and the Fresno Falcons were crowned the league champions.

== Teams ==
2001-02 West Coast Hockey League
Division	Team	City	Arena
North	Anchorage Aces	Anchorage, Alaska	Sullivan Arena
North	Colorado Gold Kings	Colorado Springs, Colorado	Colorado Springs World Arena
North	Idaho Steelheads	Boise, Idaho	Bank of America Centre
North	Tacoma Sabercats	Tacoma, Washington	Tacoma Dome
South	Bakersfield Condors	Bakersfield, California	Centennial Garden
South	Fresno Falcons	Fresno, California	Selland Arena
South	Long Beach Ice Dogs	Long Beach, California	Long Beach Sports Arena
South	San Diego Gulls	San Diego, California	San Diego Sports Arena

=== Map of teams ===
North Division South Division

== Regular season ==
Northern Division	GP	W	L	OTL	GF	GA	Pts
Idaho Steelheads	72	47	17	8	288	213	102
Colorado Gold Kings	72	39	26	7	253	221	85
Tacoma Sabercats	72	30	36	6	211	249	66
Anchorage Aces	72	19	44	9	222	330	47

Southern Division	GP	W	L	OTL	GF	GA	Pts
San Diego Gulls	72	47	22	3	255	209	97
Long Beach Ice Dogs	72	41	27	4	240	198	86
Fresno Falcons	72	33	31	8	242	267	74
Bakersfield Condors	72	32	35	5	213	237	69

== Taylor Cup-Playoffs ==
Taylor Cup-Quarterfinals
N1	Idaho Steelheads	3
N4	Anchorage Aces	1
N2	Colorado Gold Kings	2
N3	Tacoma Sabercats	3
S1	San Diego Gulls	3
S4	Bakersfield Condors	1
S2	Long Beach Ice Dogs	2
S3	Fresno Falcons	3

Taylor Cup-Semifinals
N1	Idaho Steelheads	3
N3	Tacoma Sabercats	2
S1	San Diego Gulls	1
S3	Fresno Falcons	3

Taylor Cup-Final
N1	Idaho Steelheads	2
S3	Fresno Falcons	4
