= Hardy Sauter =

Canadian ice hockey player and coach

- Born: February 25, 1971 (age 54); Dayton, Ohio, U.S.
- Height: 5 ft 9 in (175 cm)
- Weight: 178 lb (81 kg; 12 st 10 lb)
- Position: Defense
- Shot: Right
- Played for: Oklahoma City Blazers; Tallahassee Tiger Sharks; Houston Aeros
- Playing career: 1995–2005

Hardy Sauter (born February 25, 1971) is an American-born Canadian former professional ice hockey defenseman and coach.

== Playing career ==
Sauter was born in Dayton, Ohio, but moved to Maryfield, Saskatchewan at a young age.

Sauter played junior hockey with the Brandon Wheat Kings and Spokane Chiefs of the Western Hockey League. He made his professional debut with the ECHL Tallahassee Tiger Sharks during the 1995–96 season. Sauter also played for the Houston Aeros in the International Hockey League.

As a player, Sauter was best known as a member of the Oklahoma City Blazers in the Central Hockey League. Sauter played in 590 games with the Blazers between 1996 and 2005, retiring as the CHL's all-time scoring leader among defensemen and in the league's all-time top 10 overall in assists and points. Sauter was elected to the CHL Hall of Fame in 2013.

== Coaching career ==
Immediately after retiring from the Blazers in 2005 Sauter accepted the head coaching position with the Nipawin Hawks of the Saskatchewan Junior Hockey League. In 2007 Sauter was hired as an assistant coach by the Spokane Chiefs and promoted to head coach the following season, but was fired in 2010.

Later in 2010 Sauter became head coach of the ECHL Idaho Steelheads. Sauter compiled a 63-59-22 record in two seasons in Idaho, but failed to take the team past the second round in the ECHL playoffs. The Steelheads declined to renew his contract after the 2011–12 season.
