= Idaho Steelheads =

Professional minor league ice hockey team in Boise, Idaho

- City: Boise, Idaho
- League: ECHL
- Conference: Western
- Division: Mountain
- Founded: 1997 (in the WCHL)
- Home arena: Idaho Central Arena
- Colors: Navy blue, silver, black, white
- Owner: Idaho Sports Properties LLC
- General manager: Steven Anderson
- Head coach: Everett Sheen
- Media: KTIK; Idaho Statesman
- Affiliates: Dallas Stars (NHL); Texas Stars (AHL)
- Website: idahosteelheads.com

Franchise history
- 1997–present: Idaho Steelheads

Championships
- Regular season titles: 3 (2002–03, 2009–10, 2022–23)
- Division titles: 6 (2000–01, 2001–02, 2002–03, 2009–10, 2014–15, 2022–23)
- Conference titles: 6 (2000–01, 2001–02, 2003–04, 2006–07, 2009–10, 2022–23)
- Kelly Cups: 2 (2003–04, 2006–07)

The Idaho Steelheads are an American professional minor league ice hockey team based in Boise, Idaho, and a member of the ECHL. The Steelheads play in the Mountain Division of the ECHL's Western Conference since the 2016–17 season.

In 1996, the Steelheads were announced as a 1997–98 expansion team by Diamond Sports Management, headed by Cord Pereira, as a member of the West Coast Hockey League (WCHL). The Steelheads and the rest of the WCHL joined the ECHL in 2003. As of the 2022–23 season, the Steelheads are the westernmost ECHL team. During the 2003–04 season and since the 2005–06 season the Steelheads have been an affiliate of the National Hockey League's Dallas Stars. The Austin-based Texas Stars have been the Dallas Stars AHL affiliate since the 2009–10 season. Home games are played at the 5,002-seat Idaho Central Arena in downtown Boise.

The Steelheads are named for a species of seagoing rainbow trout native to Idaho streams and rivers and popular with local anglers. Despite this, the original primary and alternate logos consisted of a puck bouncing off a hockey mask and the state of Idaho respectively. When the team underwent a rebrand in the 2006–07 season, a trout was included in Idaho's alternate. After the departure of the Victoria Salmon Kings in 2011, the Steelheads made the trout logo their new primary one.

== History ==
=== WCHL ===
==== 1997–2003 ====
The Steelheads began play as part of a four-team expansion in the West Coast Hockey League in 1997, along with the Tacoma Sabercats, Phoenix Mustangs and Tucson Gila Monsters, which have all since ceased operations. Former New York Islanders defenseman Dave Langevin became Idaho's first head coach. During its inaugural season, in addition to its WCHL schedule the Steelheads played two exhibition games in Boise against the Russian Super League team CKA-Amur (now Amur Khabarovsk). The Steelheads finished third in the WCHL North Division in 1997–98, but were eliminated in the first round of the playoffs by the Anchorage Aces (later known as the Alaska Aces).

Langevin left the team in 1998 and was replaced as head coach by former NHL goaltender Clint Malarchuk. Under Malarchuk the Steelheads were eliminated in the first round of the playoffs in 1998–99 and 1999–00.

In 2000, Malarchuk was succeeded as head coach by John Olver, who had coached the Tacoma Sabercats to the WCHL championship in 1998–99. The Steelheads reached the WCHL finals in 2000–01 and 2001–02, but were defeated by the San Diego Gulls and Fresno Falcons, respectively.

Although the Steelheads finished with the best record in the WCHL's final season in 2002–03, the Falcons eliminated them in the first round of the playoffs.

=== ECHL ===
The Idaho Steelheads have been a member of the ECHL since 2003, winning the league's Kelly Cup championship in 2004 and 2007. They are one of only five active ECHL teams to win multiple league championships, alongside the South Carolina Stingrays with three championships, and the Allen Americans, Florida Everblades and Toledo Walleye (which was then known as the Storm prior to suspending operations in 2007 to build their new arena) with two each. The defunct Alaska Aces and Hampton Roads Admirals also won three ECHL championships each.

==== 2003–2010 ====
In 2003, the WCHL was absorbed by the ECHL and folded. The Steelheads, along with several other WCHL-affiliated teams – namely the Alaska Aces, Bakersfield Condors, Fresno Falcons, Las Vegas Wranglers, Long Beach Ice Dogs and San Diego Gulls – became ECHL members beginning with the 2003–04 season. Idaho won the 2004 Kelly Cup in its first season in the ECHL, defeating the Florida Everblades in the Kelly Cup finals. The Steelheads were the first team to win the ECHL championship in its first year in the league since the Greensboro Monarchs won the title in the league's second season of operation (1989–90).

In 2004–05 the Steelheads were eliminated in the first round of the ECHL playoffs by the Long Beach Ice Dogs. Olver was succeeded as head coach by Derek Laxdal after the season. In 2005–06 Laxdal guided the team back to the playoffs, but they were eliminated in the second round by the Las Vegas Wranglers.

The Steelheads hosted the 2007 ECHL All-Star Game in Boise. Later that year the Steelheads won their second Kelly Cup by defeating the Stockton Thunder, Las Vegas Wranglers and Alaska Aces in the playoffs, and ultimately the Dayton Bombers in the league finals.

In the 2007–08 playoffs, Idaho was swept in the first round by eventual champions the Alaska Aces, and in the 2008–09 playoffs lost to Victoria Salmon Kings in the first round.

In 2009–10, the Steelheads clinched their first Brabham Cup (ECHL regular season title) with one week remaining in the season. They received a bye in the first round of the 2010 Kelly Cup Playoffs before sweeping the Utah Grizzlies in the conference semifinals and beating the Stockton Thunder in six games to win the National Conference championship to advance to their third Kelly Cup finals since joining the league in 2003. They met the Cincinnati Cyclones in the finals, but lost the series 4–1, with each game being decided by one goal.

==== 2010–present ====
Laxdal left the team after the 2009–10 season to accept the head coaching position with the major junior Edmonton Oil Kings. Although his replacement, Hardy Sauter, led the Steelheads to a playoff series victory against Las Vegas in 2010–11, he was let go after the 2011–12 season after the Steelheads failed to crack the 75-point plateau for the first time since the team's WCHL tenure. In June 2012, the Steelheads named SPHL Augusta RiverHawks head coach Brad Ralph as Sauter's replacement.

In Ralph's first season in Idaho the Steelheads advanced to the Western Conference finals, but were defeated by the Stockton Thunder in five games. In the first round of the 2013–14 playoffs, the Steelheads defeated the Colorado Eagles in six games, culminating in a quadruple overtime victory which set a record as the longest game in ECHL history. They were eliminated in the second round by the eventual champion Alaska Aces.

In 2014–15 the Steelheads won the regular season Pacific Division title with their first 100-point season since 2009–10, but were upset in the first round of the playoffs by the Utah Grizzlies. Ralph left the Steelheads in August 2015 to take the head coaching position with the WHL Kelowna Rockets. Assistant coach and former player Neil Graham was promoted to the head coaching position several days later.

Idaho finished the 2015–16 season in second place in the West Division, although tied in points with the first place Colorado Eagles due to them having more wins. They were seeded fifth in the Western Conference for the 2016 Kelly Cup playoffs and were defeated in the conference quarterfinals by the defending champion Allen Americans, 4-games-to-3. Jefferson Dahl and Emil Molin would tie for the team lead in goals during the regular season with 22 goals. Rob Linsmayer led the team with 57 points. Philippe Desrosiers appeared in a team high 31 games in goal for the Steelheads with a 15–7–6 record with a 2.34 GAA and 2 shutouts. Idaho would finish 15th overall in attendance with an average of 4198 fans per game.

As of the end of the 2018–19 season, the Steelheads have never missed the playoffs in either the WCHL or the ECHL. When the Detroit Red Wings became eliminated from the 2017 Stanley Cup playoffs, the Steelheads then had the longest active playoff streak in professional hockey at twenty seasons in 2016–17. This streak ended when the Steelheads failed to make the playoffs at the end of the 2021–22 season.

In early 2019, it was confirmed that the Steelheads had been approached by the upcoming Seattle Kraken with an interest in the Steelheads becoming their American Hockey League affiliate, although the Kraken later filed for an AHL expansion team in Palm Springs, California, which came to be the Coachella Valley Firebirds.

In July 2019, head coach Neil Graham was hired as an assistant coach of the AHL affiliate Texas Stars and was replaced by Steelheads' assistant Everett Sheen. Due to the COVID-19 pandemic, the Steelheads voluntarily suspended operations for the 2020–21 ECHL season.

== Rivalries ==
The Steelheads' most notable rival are the Utah Grizzlies due to proximity.

The team's former rivals include the refugees of the old WCHL: the Alaska Aces, Fresno Falcons, and Bakersfield Condors. In their original markets, their common history stretched back nearly twenty years. Fresno then folded in 2008, Bakersfield relocated to become the new Norfolk Admirals in 2015, and the Alaska franchise folded in 2017 before it was sold to become the Maine Mariners.

Until their 2014 suspension of operations, the Steelheads also had a rivalry with the Las Vegas Wranglers due to their frequent playoff meetings.

== Logos ==
Primary, 1997–98 to 2005–06

Alternate logo, 1997–98

Primary, 2006–07 to 2010–11
Alternate logo since 2011–12

== Media ==
All Steelheads games are broadcast on AM 1350 KTIK in Boise and have been since the 1997 inception of the franchise. KTIK and the Steelheads were under the same ownership until Citadel Broadcasting's 2002 purchase of the station. SparkLight cable carries live video on channel 72. Collin Schuck is the voice of the Steelheads for all home and away games since joining the organization in 2018.

In 2021 streaming video coverage was added with the ECHL partnership with FloSports. Collin Schuck's radio play by play is blended with in house CCTV video during away games, and additional production features (such as stream only instant replay on separate feed from CCTV) for home games.

== Season-by-season record ==
Note: GP = Games played, W = Wins, L = Losses, OTL = Overtime losses, SOL = Shootout losses, Pts = Points, GF = Goals for, GA = Goals against, PIM = Penalties in minutes

Records as of end of the 2025–26 ECHL season.

Regular season													Playoffs				
Season	League	GP	W	L	OTL	SOL	Pts	GF	GA	PIM	Standing	Coach	Year	1st round	2nd round	3rd round	Finals
1997–98	WCHL	64	27	30	—	7	61	253	275	2057	3rd, North	Dave Langevin	1998	—	L, 1–3, ANC	—	—
1998–99	WCHL	71	31	34	—	6	68	265	298	2027	4th, North	Clint Malarchuk	1999	—	L, 0–2, TAC	—	—
1999–00	WCHL	72	31	36	—	5	67	287	300	1943	4th, North	Clint Malarchuk	2000	—	L, 0–3, TAC	—	—
2000–01	WCHL	72	47	21	—	4	98	293	244	1631	1st, North	John Olver	2001	—	W, 3–0, ANC	W, 3–0, COL	L, 3–4, SDG
2001–02	WCHL	72	47	17	—	8	102	288	213	1846	1st, North	John Olver	2002	—	W, 3–1, ANC	W, 3–2, TAC	L, 2–4, FRE
2002–03	WCHL	72	52	16	—	4	108	267	186	1421	1st, WCHL	John Olver	2003	—		L, 2–4, FRE	—
2003–04	ECHL	72	40	23	—	9	89	219	208	1725	3rd, Pacific	John Olver	2004	W, 3–2, LV	W, 3–1, AK	W, 3–1, GWT	W, 4–1, FLA
2004–05	ECHL	72	42	23	2	5	91	223	183	1437	3rd, West	John Olver	2005	L, 1–3, LBH	—	—	—
2005–06	ECHL	72	43	21	4	4	94	268	221	1650	3rd, West	Derek Laxdal	2006	L, 3–4, LV	—	—	—
2006–07	ECHL	72	42	24	2	4	90	240	208	1621	2nd, West	Derek Laxdal	2007	W, 4–2, STK	W, 4–2, LV	W, 4–1, AK	W, 4–1, DAY
2007–08	ECHL	72	40	22	5	5	90	224	183	1492	2nd, West	Derek Laxdal	2008	L, 0–4, AK	—	—	—
2008–09	ECHL	72	44	24	2	2	90	224	186	1361	2nd, West	Derek Laxdal	2009	L, 0–4, VIC	—	—	—
2009–10	ECHL	72	48	17	2	5	103	260	191	1361	1st, West	Derek Laxdal	2010	BYE	W, 4–0, UTA	W, 4–2, STK	L, 1–4, CIN
2010–11	ECHL	72	32	27	4	9	77	225	217	1124	2nd, Mountain	Hardy Sauter	2011	W, 3–2, LV	L, 0–4, AK	—	—
2011–12	ECHL	72	31	32	2	7	71	194	236	1169	4th, Mountain	Hardy Sauter	2012	W, 3–2, ONT	L, 1–4, LV	—	—
2012–13	ECHL	72	45	20	1	6	97	262	198	1337	2nd, Mountain	Brad Ralph	2013	W, 4–2, COL	W, 4–2, ONT	L, 1–4, STK	—
2013–14	ECHL	72	39	26	3	4	85	223	212	1418	2nd, Mountain	Brad Ralph	2014	W, 4–2, COL	L, 1–4, AK	—	—
2014–15	ECHL	72	48	18	2	4	102	258	187	1170	1st, Pacific	Brad Ralph	2015	L, 2–4, UTA	—	—	—
2015–16	ECHL	72	38	24	7	3	86	203	187	917	2nd, West	Neil Graham	2016	L, 3–4, ALN	—	—	—
2016–17	ECHL	72	43	22	5	2	93	234	206	1122	3rd, Mountain	Neil Graham	2017	L, 1–4, COL	—	—	—
2017–18	ECHL	72	44	20	5	3	96	244	188	1240	2nd, Mountain	Neil Graham	2018	W, 4–3, ALN	L, 0–4, COL	—	—
2018–19	ECHL	72	41	25	4	2	88	241	203	1410	2nd, Mountain	Neil Graham	2019	W, 4–1, UTA	L, 2–4, TUL	—	—
2019–20	ECHL	61	36	18	3	4	79	168	155	744	2nd, Mountain	Everett Sheen	2020	Season cancelled due to the COVID-19 pandemic			
2020–21	ECHL	Opted out of participating due to the COVID-19 pandemic											2021	did not participate			
2021–22	ECHL	72	36	33	2	1	75	216	191	807	5th, Mountain	Everett Sheen	2022	did not qualify			
2022–23	ECHL	72	58	11	1	2	119	290	153	833	1st, Mountain	Everett Sheen	2023	W, 4–2, UTA	W, 4–1, ALN	W, 4–1, TOL	L, 0–4, FLA
2023–24	ECHL	72	48	20	2	2	100	303	242	830	2nd, Mountain	Everett Sheen	2024	W, 4–1, ALN	L, 1–4, KCM	—	—
2024–25	ECHL	72	37	25	9	1	84	251	231	912	5th, Mountain	Everett Sheen	2025	did not qualify			
2025–26	ECHL	72	42	23	6	1	91	251	219	1,061	3rd, Mountain	Everett Sheen	2026	L, 1–4, ALN	—	—	—

== Players ==
=== Retired numbers ===
Idaho Steelheads retired numbers
No.	Player	Position	Career	No. retirement
4	Jeremy Mylymok	D	2000–2006	December 1, 2008
12	Scott Burt	LW	2000-2007	February 3, 2018
16	Marty Flichel	RW	2002–2012	January 5, 2015
22	Cal Ingraham	F	1998–2002	October 28, 2004

== Championships ==
Year	League	Trophy
2003–2004	ECHL	Kelly Cup
2006–2007	ECHL	Kelly Cup
2009–2010	ECHL	Brabham Cup
2022–2023	ECHL	Brabham Cup

Preceded by Atlantic City Boardwalk Bullies	Kelly Cup champions 2003–04	Succeeded by Trenton Titans
Preceded by Alaska Aces	Kelly Cup champions 2006–07	Succeeded by Cincinnati Cyclones
Preceded by Florida Everblades	Brabham Cup champions 2009–10	Succeeded by Alaska Aces
Preceded by Toledo Walleye	Brabham Cup champions 2022–23	Succeeded by Incumbent
