= Alaska Aces (ECHL) =

Defunct ice hockey team

- City: Anchorage, Alaska
- League: ECHL
- Operated: 1989–2017
- Home arena: Sullivan Arena
- Colors: Black, glacier blue, green, silver, white
- Owners: Terry Parks, Steve Adams, Al Haynes, Dan Coffey, Rod Udd (d. 2017), Jerry Mackey
- Media: Root Sports Northwest; KFQD (NewsTalk 750/103.7)
- Affiliates: Calgary Flames; Minnesota Wild; Vancouver Canucks

Franchise history
- 1989–2003: Anchorage Aces
- 2003–2017: Alaska Aces

Championships
- Regular season titles: 5 (2005–06, 2010–11, 2011–12, 2012–13, 2013–14)
- Division titles: 8 (2004–05, 2005–06, 2006–07, 2008–09, 2010–11, 2011–12, 2012–13, 2013–14)
- Conference titles: 4 (2005–06, 2008–09, 2010–11, 2013–14)
- Kelly Cups: 3 (2005–06, 2010–11, 2013–14)

The Alaska Aces, known as the Anchorage Aces until 2003, were a professional ice hockey team in Anchorage, Alaska. Home games were played at Sullivan Arena in Anchorage. The Aces won three Kelly Cup championships, with their last championship following the 2013–14 ECHL season.

The Aces were formed as a semi-professional team in the Pacific Southwest Hockey League (PSHL) in 1989 and became a charter member of the professional West Coast Hockey League (WCHL) in 1995. When the WCHL was absorbed by the East Coast Hockey League in 2003, the team joined the merged ECHL.

The Aces official team mascot was a polar bear named Boomer. Aces fans were known for using small, ceremonial cow bells painted with the Aces insignia to show their support during games.

In 2017, the ownership group announced that the 2016–17 season would be the team's last, after which the franchise would cease operations. The owners cited the struggling Alaskan economy, and sagging ticket sales among the reasons for the club's financial downfall. In June 2017, the franchise was sold and relocated to Portland, Maine, to become the Maine Mariners for the 2018–19 season.

== Franchise history ==
=== Early semi-professional days (1989–1995) ===
The team was established in 1989 as the Anchorage Aces. They were originally a semi-professional club in the Pacific Southwest Hockey League organized by Dennis Sorenson, as a senior men's ice hockey team to compete against the established Alaska Gold Kings in Fairbanks.

The Aces played four unofficial games during the 1989–90 season. During the 1990–91 season, Keith Street led the team on a 22–game schedule, which included 20 games against teams registered with USA Hockey. The 1990–91 season ended with the Aces winning the Senior Men's Open National Championship held in Fairbanks. In 1993 and 1994, they won the National Amateur Championship. They finished second in 1992 and 1995.

The Aces joined the Pacific Northwest Hockey League (PNHL) for the 1991–92 season, playing six of their home games at the Sullivan Arena in Anchorage and eight at the Central Peninsula Sports Center in Soldotna. The Aces finished second in the PNHL with a 16–12–2 regular season record, and were the runners-up in the national USA Hockey tourney after a 0–4–1 tourney run.

In the 1992–93 season, new head coach Mike Ashley led the Aces to a 19–3–0 regular season record. In the USA Hockey Senior Men's Open Tournament, the Aces finished second for the second year in a row after compiling a 4–1 record in the tourney, losing the tiebreaker to the Chicago Chargers. Ashley resigned following the season.

For the 1993–94 season, the Aces played as an independent team. Steve Gasparini took over as head coach, and led the Aces to a 22–9–1 regular season record. The Aces also won their second championship in the USA Hockey Senior Men's Open National Tournament with a 5–0 run highlighted by the 6–0 rout of the Fresno Falcons. In 1994–95, the Aces joined the Pacific Hockey League (PHL), formed by a merger of the PSHL and PNHL. The team went 27–9 and lost in the championship game to the Gold Kings.

=== West Coast Hockey League (1995–2003) ===
The PHL folded after only one season. After an unsuccessful attempt to form a new Pacific Rim Hockey League, the Aces joined the new West Coast Hockey League (WCHL) for the 1995–96 season. Mike Cusack Jr. became sole owner of the franchise following the 1995–96 season.

In the 1996–97 season, the Aces initially lost in the league playoffs to the Fresno Falcons in four games. The WCHL commissioner determined that their 2–4 loss in game four would be changed to a 1–0 victory due to forfeit by the Fresno Falcons, when they failed to meet the minimum roster requirement due to injuries and suspensions. The Aces won the deciding fifth game 5–3 and advanced to the Taylor Cup finals, but were defeated by the San Diego Gulls.

==== Stirling Wright ====
In the 2000–01 season, Stirling Wright was brought in to serve as assistant coach. He was instrumental in bringing in former NHL players when the Aces signed former NHL goalie Vincent Riendeau and right wing Kevin Brown. The Idaho Steelheads defeated the Aces 3–0 in the first round of the playoffs. Overall, the Aces finished in third place with a 34–30–4 record and advanced to the semifinals, only to be ousted by the Tacoma Sabercats in three games.

In 2001–02, Wright was promoted within the franchise and began serving as the new general manager. He hired former NHL coach and player Butch Goring as the team's new head coach. In effort to revamp the team, Wright only extended the contracts of four players from the previous season. The Aces additionally signed five former NHL players, including defenseman Jim Paek, goaltender Scott Bailey, wingers Todd Harkins and Daniel Goneau, and center Clayton Beddoes.

Clayton Beddoes retired just a few games into the season due to a previous shoulder injury. The Aces promoted a "Guaranteed Win Night" where if they lost the game, the fans in attendance would receive free Aces tickets.

==== Mike Cusack ====
After a 10–18–4 season start, Aces' owner, Mike Cusack, fired Goring and Lou Corletto, who served the franchise as Vice President of Business Operations. He brought back former head coach, Walt Poddubny. Stirling Wright stepped down as general manager, due to his disapproval of the owner's decisions. The Aces went on to win only a few more games and the mass exodus of players soon followed, after Wright left the team. The team itself was making a profit, but the owner's other financial ventures continued to drain the team of its revenue.

In May 2002, the team owner filed personal bankruptcy. Cusack included his ownership of the Anchorage Aces franchise in the filing. According to the filing papers, the team was almost $2 million in debt.

In June 2002, Cusack put the team up for sale on eBay. The club's owner, Cusack, accepted a $1.862 million bid from Duncan Harrison, owner of Alaskan Automotive Distributing in Anchorage, but U.S. Bankruptcy Court judge Donald MacDonald converted the Aces' bankruptcy case to Chapter 7, which allowed him to reject the Harrison bid.

The listing was withdrawn when it was discovered that a US$2.3 million bid was a college student's prank.

The club was eventually sold for $1.05 million to a seven-member group. As of 2015 the Aces and Idaho Steelheads were the only former WCHL teams still playing in their original markets.

=== ECHL (2003–2017) ===
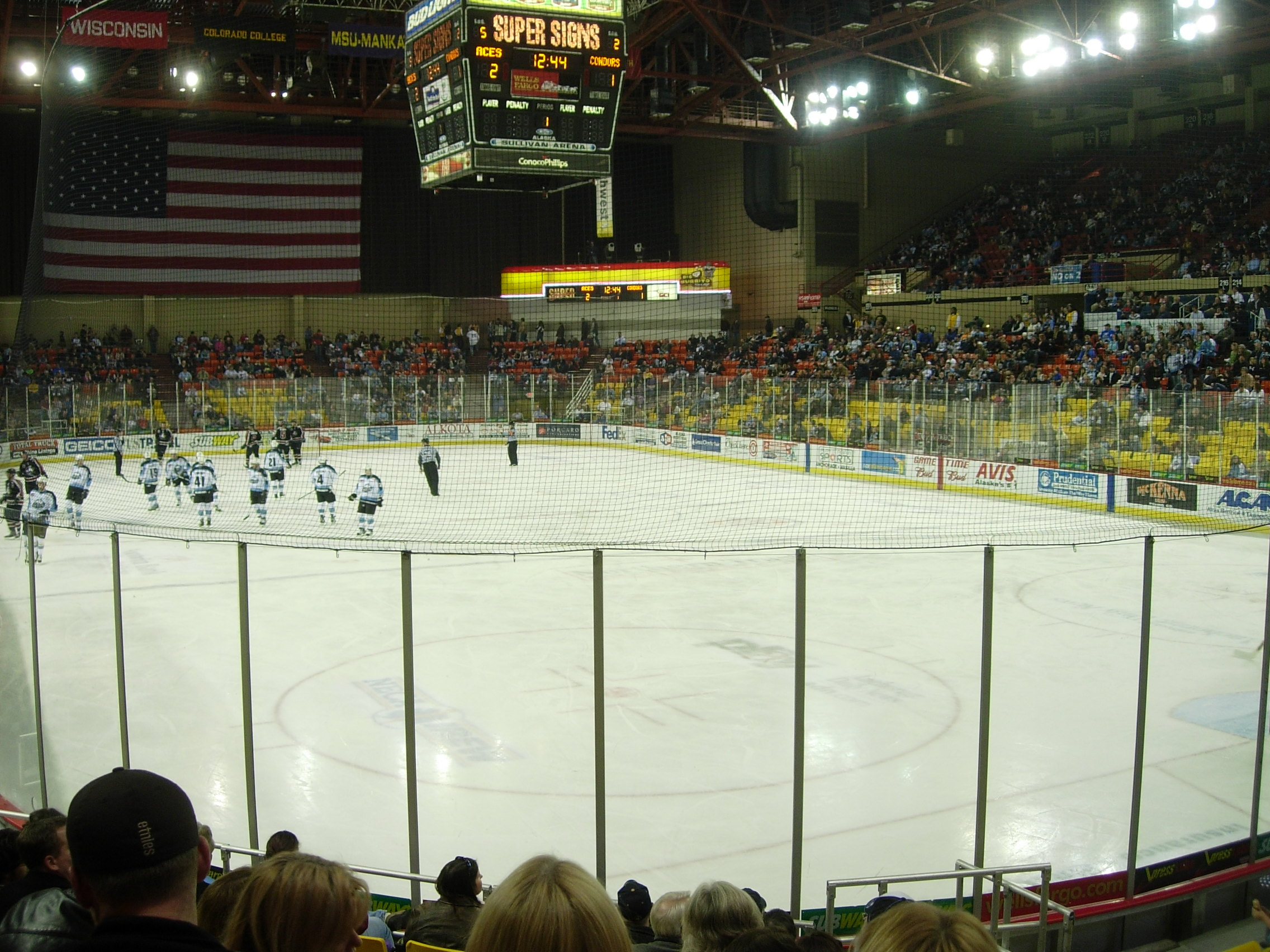
Alaska Aces playing on October 27, 2006.

The Aces joined the ECHL for the 2003–04 season following a merger between the WCHL and the East Coast Hockey League. They were renamed the Alaska Aces after the league switch, and unveiled a new logo and new uniforms.

The team gained national prominence in 2004 when it signed New Jersey Devils all-star and Alaska-born Scott Gomez during that season's NHL lockout. Gomez went on to lead the ECHL in scoring and win league Most Valuable Player honors.

The Aces' 2006 triple overtime win against the Las Vegas Wranglers was at the time the third-longest game in ECHL history, concluding after 113 minutes, 30 seconds.

In 2006, the Aces became only the second team in ECHL history (joining the South Carolina Stingrays of Charleston, SC) in winning both the Brabham Cup and Kelly Cup championships in the same season. In 2008, the Cincinnati Cyclones became the third team to accomplish this feat. In 2011, the Aces accomplished the feat for the second time, becoming the first team to ever do it twice.

In 2006, Alaska won the ECHL Kelly Cup title in five games over the Gwinnett Gladiators. This was the first professional sports title won by an Alaskan team since the Anchorage Northern Knights won the Continental Basketball Association championship in 1980. Mike Scott received the ECHL Kelly Cup MVP award after the Aces' 4–3 win over the Gladiators in game five of the series.

In 2009, the Aces stormed through the first three rounds of the Kelly Cup Playoffs, winning in five games against both the Utah Grizzlies and the Victoria Salmon Kings in the first two rounds, and sweeping the Las Vegas Wranglers in the National Conference Finals. They were in the Kelly Cup Finals for the first time since their championship season in 2006, but they lost in seven games to the South Carolina Stingrays.

In 2010–11, the Aces dominated the entire season, winning the Brabham Cup by earning the best record in the league, as well as leading the league in points scored. Wes Goldie lead the league in goals scored. In the Kelly Cup Playoffs, they swept the Idaho Steelheads and Victoria Salmon Kings, and then won the Kelly Cup Championship over the Kalamazoo Wings in five games. The Aces won a third Kelly Cup in 2014, defeating the Cincinnati Cyclones in the finals in six games.

On August 22, 2013, the Aces announced their affiliation with the Calgary Flames.

In 2014–15 the Aces defended their Kelly Cup championship playing in the Pacific Division of the ECHL's Western Conference, but failed to make the playoffs for the first time since the team's WCHL days. They would miss the playoffs again in 2016.

The Aces were the northernmost and westernmost team in the ECHL, located 2,731 miles (4,395 km) from their closest geographical rival, the Idaho Steelheads. As a result, the team spent over $300,000 in travel-related costs during the 2014–15 season despite playing road games in only six different locations. In 2017, co-owner Jerry Mackie stated that the ownership was considering ceasing operation upon the completion of the 2016–17 season due to the mounting financial losses, the recent sagging Alaskan economy, the aforementioned high travel costs and dwindling attendance. On February 23, the ownership officially announced the 2016–17 season would be its last.

On April 8, 2017, the Aces played their final game in a 3–2 loss to the Idaho Steelheads in front of a sold out Sullivan Arena.

In June 2017, the Aces' ECHL membership was sold to Comcast Spectacor, who relocated the team to Portland, Maine, for the 2018–19 ECHL season.

== Season-by-season record ==
Note: GP = Games played, W = Wins, L = Losses, T = Ties, OTL = Overtime losses, SOL = Shootout losses, Pts = Points, PCT = Winning percentage, GF = Goals for, GA = Goals against, PIM = Penalties in minutes.
Records as of 2016.

Regular Season													Playoffs				
Season	GP	W	L	T	OTL	SOL	Pts	PCT	GF	GA	PIM	Standing	Year	1st round	2nd round	3rd round	Finals
1995–96	58	24	29	0	5	0	53	0.414	271	299	1758	5th of 6, WCHL	1996	—		did not qualify	
1996–97	64	41	18	0	5	0	87	0.641	349	260	2142	2nd of 6, WCHL	1997	—		W, 3–2, FRE	L, 0–4, SD
1997–98	64	36	20	0	8	0	80	0.562	308	261	2075	2nd of 4, WCHL North Div.	1998	—	W, 3–1, IDA	L, 0–4, TAC	—
1998–99	71	46	22	0	3	0	95	0.648	332	260	1759	2nd of 4, WCHL North Div.	1999	—	W, 2–1, COL	L, 0–3, TAC	—
1999–00	74	31	34	0	9	0	71	0.419	272	334	1828	3rd of 4, WCHL North Div.	2000	—	L, 1–3, COL	—	—
2000–01	72	27	41	0	4	0	58	0.375	264	324	1820	4th of 4, WCHL North Div.	2001	—	L, 0–3, IDA	—	—
2001–02	72	19	44	0	9	0	47	0.264	222	350	1573	4th of 4, WCHL North Div.	2002	—	L, 1–3, IDA	—	—
2002–03	72	21	46	0	5	0	47	0.292	210	327	1926	6th of 6, WCHL	2003	—		did not qualify	
2003–04	72	38	28	6	0	0	82	0.569	220	210	1648	4th of 7, ECHL Pacific Div.	2004	W, 3–0, SD	L, 1–3, IDA	—	—
2004–05	72	45	19	8	0	0	98	0.681	233	187	1389	1st of 8, ECHL West Div.	2005	W, 3–2, BAK	W, 3–0, LB	L, 3–4, TRE	—
2005–06	72	53	12	7	0	0	113	0.785	289	168	1786	1st of 6, ECHL West Div.	2006	W, 4–0, UTA	W, 4–2, LV	W, 4–3, FRE	W, 4–1, GWT
2006–07	72	49	16	7	0	0	105	0.729	270	176	1972	1st of 5, ECHL West Div.	2007	W, 4–2, VIC	W, 4–0, BAK	L, 1–4, IDA	—
2007–08	72	41	26	0	4	1	87	0.604	245	249	1319	3rd of 5, ECHL West Div.	2008	W, 4–0, IDA	L, 1–4, LV	—	—
2008–09	72	45	24	1	2	0	93	0.646	232	181	1537	1st of 5, ECHL West Div.	2009	W, 4–1, UTA	W, 4–1, VIC	W, 4–0, LV	L, 3–4, SC
2009–10	72	36	28	0	4	4	80	0.556	232	240	1566	2nd of 4, ECHL West Div.	2010	L, 1–3, STK	—	—	—
2010–11	72	47	22	0	2	1	97	0.674	241	174	947	1st of 4, ECHL Mountain Div.	2011	BYE	W, 4–0, IDA	W, 4–0, VIC	W, 4–1, KAL
2011–12	72	43	18	0	3	8	97	0.674	224	172	929	1st of 4, ECHL Mountain Div.	2012	BYE	W, 4–1, STK	L, 1–4, LV	—
2012–13	72	49	15	0	4	4	106	0.736	228	172	1086	1st of 4, ECHL Mountain Div.	2013	W, 4–1, SF	L, 2–4, STK	—	—
2013–14	71	45	19	0	3	4	97	0.683	243	164	989	1st of 4, ECHL Mountain Div.	2014	W, 4–0, LV	W, 4–1, IDA	W, 4–2, BAK	W, 4–2, CIN
2014–15	72	35	30	0	3	4	77	0.535	237	233	1211	5th of 7, ECHL Pacific Div.	2015	did not qualify			
2015–16	72	27	38	—	4	3	61	0.424	189	237	1171	5th of 5, ECHL West Div.	2016	did not qualify			
2016–17	72	32	30	—	3	7	74	0.514	219	230	1154	6th of 7, ECHL Mountain Div.	2017	did not qualify			

== Notable players ==
Player	Position	GP
Chris Beckford-Tseu	G	56
Wade Brookbank	LW/D	72
Joey Crabb	RW	35
Kimbi Daniels	C	557
Brandon Dubinsky	C	17
Wes Goldie	RW	165
Scott Gomez	C	76
Stefan Grogg	F	7
Derek Gustafson	G	91
Barrett Heisten	LW	182
Ty Jones	W	12
D. J. King	LW	5
Doug Lynch	D	30
Peter Metcalf	D	200
Ryan Reaves	RW	9
Marek Schwarz	G	19
Nate Thompson	C	27
Matt Underhill	G	66
B. J. Young	RW	144

== Head coaches ==
- Steve Gasparini, 1995–96
- Walt Poddubny, 1996–2000, 2000–01, 2001–02
- Bob Wilkie, 2000 (12 games)
- Derek Donald, 2000 (3 games)
- Steve MacSwain, 2000 (1 game)
- Butch Goring, 2001
- Rod Davidson, 2002–03
- Perry Florio, 2003
- Davis Payne, 2003–07
- Keith McCambridge, 2007–09
- Brent Thompson, 2009–11
- Rob Murray, 2011–2017

== Retired numbers ==
Anchorage/Alaska Aces retired numbers
No.	Player	Position	Career
8	Keith Street	C	1991–92, 1993–2001
16	Wes Goldie	RW	2010–2012
18	Dean Larson	C	1995–2003

League Championships
Preceded by Pensacola Ice Pilots	Brabham Cup; 2005–06	Succeeded by Las Vegas Wranglers
Preceded by Trenton Titans	Kelly Cup; 2005–06	Succeeded by Idaho Steelheads
Preceded by Idaho Steelheads	Brabham Cup; 2010–11 to 2013–14	Succeeded by Toledo Walleye
Preceded by Cincinnati Cyclones	Kelly Cup; 2010–11	Succeeded by Florida Everblades
