= San Diego Gulls (1990–1995) =

Professional ice hockey team

- City: San Diego, California
- League: International Hockey League
- Division: Southwest
- Founded: 1990
- Operated: 1990-1995
- Folded: 2007
- Home arena: San Diego Sports Arena
- Colors: Red, black

Franchise history
- 1990–1995: San Diego Gulls
- 1995–1996: Los Angeles Ice Dogs
- 1996–2007: Long Beach Ice Dogs

The San Diego Gulls were a professional ice hockey team based in San Diego, California, that competed in the International Hockey League (IHL). The team, the second to use the Gulls nickname, was founded in 1990. The team played its home games at the San Diego Sports Arena.

== History ==
The team played five seasons, then relocated to Los Angeles, California, in 1995 to become the Los Angeles Ice Dogs. After one season in Los Angeles, the team moved to Long Beach to become the Long Beach Ice Dogs and later would leave the IHL and join the WCHL (West Coast Hockey League).

The Gulls were coached by Mike O'Connell (1990–91), Don Waddell (1991–92), Rick Dudley (1992–93), Harold Snepsts (1993–94), and Walt Kyle (1994–95). In the 1992–93 season, the Gulls won the Fred A. Huber Trophy, finishing first place overall in the regular season, setting an IHL record of 132 points earned as a team. The Gulls reached the Turner Cup finals, led by goaltender Clint Malarchuk, but were swept in four games by the Fort Wayne Komets.

== Season-by-season results ==
Legend: OL=Overtime loss, Pct=Winning percentage

Season	Games	Won	Lost	OL	Points	Pct %	Goals for	Goals against	Playoffs
1990–91	83	30	45	8	68	0.410	273	362	Out of Playoffs
1991–92	82	45	28	9	99	0.604	340	298	Lost in round 1
1992–93	82	62	12	8	132	0.805	381	229	Lost in finals
1993–94	81	42	28	11	95	0.586	311	302	Lost in round 2
1994–95	81	37	36	8	82	0.506	268	301	Lost in round 1

== Former San Diego Gulls Players (IHL) ==
- Hubie McDonough
- Darin Banister
- Allan Bester
- Ron Duguay
- Dmitri Kvartalnov
- Glen Hanlon
- Charlie Simmer
- Ray Whitney
- Rick Knickle
- Steve Martinson
- Tony McKegney
- Clark Donatelli
- Steve Dykstra
- Jim McGeough
- Alain Chevrier
- Sean Burke
- Len Hachborn
- Jason Lafreniere
- Bruce Hoffort
- Daniel Shank
- Doug Smail
- Lindy Ruff
- Denny Lambert
- Clint Malarchuk
- Don McSween

== See also ==
- San Diego Gulls (1995–2006)
