= San Diego Gulls (1995–2006) =

- City: San Diego, California
- Founded: 1995
- Operated: 1995–2006
- Home arena: San Diego Sports Arena
- Colors: Orange, white, black

Franchise history
- 1995–2003: San Diego Gulls (WCHL)
- 2003–2006: San Diego Gulls (ECHL)

Championships
- Regular season titles: 6 (1995–96, 1996–97, 1997–98, 1998–99, 2000–01, 2003–04)
- Division titles: 6 (1997–98, 1998–99, 1999–00, 2000–01, 2001–02, 2003–04)
- Taylor Cups: 5 (1995–96, 1996–97, 1997–98, 2000–01, 2002–03)

The San Diego Gulls were a professional ice hockey team based in San Diego, California, that competed in the West Coast Hockey League (WCHL) and later in the ECHL. The team, the third to use the Gulls nickname, was founded in 1995 immediately upon the departure of the IHL team of the same name. The team played its home games at the San Diego Sports Arena.

== History ==
The Gulls were the dominant team throughout the WCHL's eight-year existence, winning the regular season championship five times. The Gulls never finished worse than second overall in WCHL league play, attaining the 100-point mark five times. The Gulls also won five of the league's Taylor Cup championships. No other WCHL team won the Taylor Cup more than once.

In 2003, the WCHL was absorbed by the ECHL, formerly known as the East Coast Hockey League. In 2004, the Gulls became the ECHL affiliate of the Colorado Avalanche. The Gulls won the ECHL regular season title in 2003–04 but missed the playoffs for the first and only time in their history the following year. In stark contrast to their WCHL playoff success, the Gulls failed to win a postseason series in three ECHL seasons.

Throughout their WCHL stint and through their first year of ECHL play, the Gulls were coached by St. Cloud State University (Minnesota) alumnus Steve Martinson. Martinson left the Gulls and went on to coach the Rockford IceHogs of the UHL. Martin St. Amour, who was a star for the Gulls in their WCHL years replaced Martinson as head coach prior to the 2004–05 season. St. Amour stepped down in the middle of the 2005–06 season and was replaced by former Gulls players Jamie Black and B.J. MacPherson as co-coaches. The final starting goalie was Kevin Lentz. He went 20-1-1 in the final stretch of the regular season but retired due to a knee injury.

== 2006 folding ==
On June 30, 2006, the Gulls folded and released their players as free agents following years of unprofitable seasons.

GULLS TO FORMALLY CEASE OPERATIONS FRIDAY – [ 06-29-2006] SAN DIEGO — The San Diego Gulls announced Thursday that they will formally cease operations as of Friday (June 30). Ongoing negotiations to sell the club did not materialize in a timeframe sufficient to operate for the 2006–07 season.

== Championships ==
Season	League	Championship(s)
1995–96	WCHL	Taylor Cup – Playoff Champion, Founders Cup – Regular Season Champion
1996–97	WCHL	Taylor Cup – Playoff Champion, Founders Cup – Regular Season Champion
1997–98	WCHL	Taylor Cup – Playoff Champion, Founders Cup – Regular Season Champion
2000–01	WCHL	Taylor Cup – Playoff Champion, Founders Cup – Regular Season Champion
2002–03	WCHL	Taylor Cup – Playoff Champion
2003–04	ECHL	Brabham Cup – Regular Season Champion

== Season-by-season record ==
Note: GP = Games played, W = Wins, L = Losses, OTL = Overtime losses, SOL = Shootout losses, Pts = Points, GF = Goals for, GA = Goals against, PIM = Penalties in minutes

Final records.

Season	League	GP	W	L	OTL	SOL	Pts	GF	GA	PIM	Finish	Coach	Playoffs
1995–96	WCHL	58	49	7	-	2	100	350	232	1790	1st, WCHL	Steve Martinson	Won Taylor Cup, 3-1 (Fresno)
1996–97	WCHL	64	50	12	-	2	102	400	210	2571	1st, WCHL	Steve Martinson	Won Taylor Cup, 4-0 (Anchorage)
1997–98	WCHL	64	53	10	-	1	107	347	198	2680	1st, South	Steve Martinson	Won Taylor Cup, 4-1 (Tacoma)
1998–99	WCHL	71	45	19	-	7	97	342	242	2746	1st, South	Steve Martinson	Lost in finals, 2-4 (Tacoma)
1999–00	WCHL	70	46	16	-	8	100	297	221	2234	1st, South	Steve Martinson	Lost in round 2, 1-3 (Phoenix)
2000–01	WCHL	72	50	17	-	5	105	263	192	2043	1st, South	Steve Martinson	Won Taylor Cup, 4-3 (Idaho)
2001–02	WCHL	72	47	22	-	3	97	255	209	2677	1st, South	Steve Martinson	Lost in round 2, 1-3 (Fresno)
2002–03	WCHL	72	45	22	-	5	95	245	182	1930	2nd, WCHL	Steve Martinson	Won Taylor Cup, 4-3 (Fresno)
2003–04	ECHL	72	49	13	-	10	108	240	177	1594	1st, Pacific	Steve Martinson	Lost in round 1, 0-3 (Alaska)
2004–05	ECHL	72	35	29	4	4	78	206	222	1519	6th, West	Martin St. Amour	Missed playoffs
2005–06	ECHL	72	34	30	4	4	76	213	214	1811	4th, Pacific	Martin St. Amour	Lost in round 2, 0-4 (Fresno)

== Former San Diego Gulls players (WCHL) ==
- Ralph Barahona
- Patrick Couture
- Ron Duguay
- Micki DuPont
- Rusty Fitzgerald
- Stefan Grogg
- Len Hachborn
- Trevor Koenig
- Marc Laforge
- Steve Martinson
- Sergejs Naumovs
- Mark Pederson
- Barry Potomski
- Pasi Schalin
- Daniel Shank
- Martin St. Amour
- Stephan St. Amour
- Garret Stroshein
- Dean Tiltgen
- Sergejs Visegorodcevs
- Chad Wagner
- Tyler Weiman
- Mark Woolf
- Jarret Zukiwsky
- Aaron Galitzen
- Trevor Converse
