= Tucson Gila Monsters =

Minor league pro ice hockey team (1997 to 1999)

- City: Tucson, Arizona
- Founded: 1997
- Operated: 1997–1999
- Home arena: Tucson Convention Center
- Colors: Black, dark green, green, orange, yellow, red and gold
- Owner(s): Stephen Mandel
- Head coach: Marty Raymond
- Website: https://web.archive.org/web/19981111191620/http://www.gilamonsters.com/

Championships
- Regular season titles: 0
- Division titles: 0
- Taylor Cups: 0

The Tucson Gila Monsters were a short-lived American professional minor league ice hockey team based in Tucson, Arizona. The team played throughout the 1997–98 season, but folded after 21 games during the 1998–99 season.

The Gila Monsters, named after the gila monster native to the southwestern United States, were a member team of the West Coast Hockey League.

== Season-by-season record ==
Note: GP = Games played, W = Wins, L = Losses, OTL = Overtime losses, SOL = Shootout losses, Pts = Points, GF = Goals for, GA = Goals against, PIM = Penalties in minutes

Final records.

Season	League	GP	W	L	OTL	SOL	Pts	GF	GA	PIM	Finish	Coach	Playoffs
1997–98	WCHL	64	16	43	–	5	37	213	334	1788	5th, South	Marty Raymond	Missed playoffs
1998–99	WCHL	21	7	11	–	3	17	83	90	650	N/A	Marty Raymond	Folded mid-season
