= 1998–99 WCHL season =

The 1998–99 West Coast Hockey League season was the fourth season of the West Coast Hockey League, a North American minor professional league. Nine teams began the regular season, although the Tucson Gila Monsters folded after 21 games. Tucson's unexpected mid-season exit created schedule irregularities, causing some teams to play 70 regular season games while others played 71.

The Tacoma Sabercats were the league champions.

== Teams ==
1998-99 West Coast Hockey League
Division	Team	City	Arena
North	Anchorage Aces	Anchorage, Alaska	Sullivan Arena
North	Colorado Gold Kings	Colorado Springs, Colorado	Colorado Springs World Arena
North	Idaho Steelheads	Boise, Idaho	Bank of America Centre
North	Tacoma Sabercats	Tacoma, Washington	Tacoma Dome
South	Bakersfield Condors	Bakersfield, California	Centennial Garden
South	Fresno Falcons	Fresno, California	Selland Arena
South	Phoenix Mustangs	Phoenix, Arizona	Arizona Veterans Memorial Coliseum
South	San Diego Gulls	San Diego, California	San Diego Sports Arena
South	Tucson Gila Monsters	Tucson, Arizona	Tucson Convention Center

=== Map of teams ===
North Division South Division

== Regular season ==
North Division	GP	W	L	OTL	GF	GA	Pts
Tacoma Sabercats	70	44	18	8	278	234	96
Anchorage Aces	71	46	22	3	332	260	95
Colorado Gold Kings	71	32	33	6	270	288	70
Idaho Steelheads	71	31	34	6	265	298	68

South Division	GP	W	L	OTL	GF	GA	Pts
San Diego Gulls	71	45	19	7	342	242	97
Fresno Falcons	70	35	31	4	257	296	74
Phoenix Mustangs	71	32	33	6	260	284	70
Bakersfield Condors	70	21	40	9	213	308	51
Tucson Gila Monsters*	21	7	11	3	83	90	17

* - folded mid-season

== Taylor Cup-Playoffs ==
Taylor Cup-Quarterfinals
S1	San Diego Gulls	2
S4	Bakersfield Condors	0
S2	Fresno Falcons	2
S3	Phoenix Mustangs	1
N1	Tacoma Sabercats	2
N4	Idaho Steelheads	0
N2	Anchorage Aces	2
N3	Colorado Gold Kings	1

Taylor Cup-Semifinals
S1	San Diego Gulls	3
S2	Fresno Falcons	1
N1	Tacoma Sabercats	3
N2	Anchorage Aces	0

Taylor Cup-Final
S1	San Diego Gulls	2
N1	Tacoma Sabercats	4
