= 1995–96 WCHL season =

The 1995-96 West Coast Hockey League season was the first season of the West Coast Hockey League, a North American minor professional league. Six teams participated in the regular season, and the San Diego Gulls were the league champions. The Red Army, a touring Russian team, played in 12 games.

== Teams ==
1995-96 West Coast Hockey League
Team	City	Arena
Alaska Gold Kings	Fairbanks, Alaska	Big Dipper Ice Arena
Anchorage Aces	Anchorage, Alaska	Sullivan Arena
Bakersfield Fog	Bakersfield, California	Bakersfield Convention Center
Fresno Falcons	Fresno, California	Selland Arena
Reno Renegades	Reno, Nevada	Reno-Sparks Convention Center
San Diego Gulls	San Diego, California	San Diego Sports Arena

=== Map of teams ===
WCHL Teams

== Regular season ==
	GP	W	L	OTL	GF	GA	Pts
San Diego Gulls	58	49	7	2	350	232	100
Fresno Falcons	58	30	21	7	270	232	67
Reno Renegades	58	26	24	8	271	283	60
Alaska Gold Kings	58	23	25	10	256	307	56
Anchorage Aces	58	24	29	5	271	299	53
Bakersfield Fog	58	24	29	5	271	323	53
Red Army (SKA-Amur Khabarovsk)	12	4	6	2	50	63	10

== Taylor Cup-Playoffs ==
Taylor Cup-Semifinals
1	San Diego	3
4	Alaska	2
2	Fresno	3
3	Reno	0

Taylor Cup-Final
1	San Diego	3
2	Fresno	1
