= 1996–97 WCHL season =

The 1996-97 West Coast Hockey League season was the second season of the West Coast Hockey League, a North American minor professional league. Six teams participated in the regular season, and the San Diego Gulls were the league champions.

== Teams ==
1996-97 West Coast Hockey League
| Team | City | Arena |
| Alaska Gold Kings | Fairbanks, Alaska | Big Dipper Ice Arena |
| Anchorage Aces | Anchorage, Alaska | Sullivan Arena |
| Bakersfield Fog | Bakersfield, California | Bakersfield Convention Center |
| Fresno Falcons | Fresno, California | Selland Arena |
| Reno Renegades | Reno, Nevada | Reno-Sparks Convention Center |
| San Diego Gulls | San Diego, California | San Diego Sports Arena |

=== Map of teams ===
WCHL Teams

== Regular season ==
| | GP | W | L | OTL | GF | GA | Pts |
|---|---|---|---|---|---|---|---|
| San Diego Gulls | 64 | 50 | 12 | 2 | 400 | 210 | 102 |
| Anchorage Aces | 64 | 41 | 18 | 5 | 349 | 260 | 87 |
| Fresno Falcons | 64 | 38 | 20 | 6 | 313 | 254 | 82 |
| Bakersfield Fog | 64 | 33 | 26 | 5 | 345 | 325 | 71 |
| Reno Renegades | 64 | 16 | 43 | 5 | 252 | 418 | 37 |
| Alaska Gold Kings | 64 | 13 | 47 | 4 | 230 | 423 | 30 |
| Red Army (SKA-Amur Khabarovsk) | 12 | 7 | 4 | 1 | 56 | 55 | 15 |

== Taylor Cup-Playoffs ==
Taylor Cup-Semifinals
1 | San Diego Gulls | 3
4 | Bakersfield Fog | 1
2 | Anchorage Aces | 3
3 | Fresno Falcons | 2

Taylor Cup-Final
1 | San Diego Gulls | 4
2 | Anchorage Aces | 0
