= 1997–98 WCHL season =

The 1997-98 West Coast Hockey League season was the third season of the West Coast Hockey League, a North American minor professional league. Nine teams participated in the regular season, and the San Diego Gulls were the league champions. In addition to league play, WCHL teams played regular season games against the Russian Superleague team CKA-Amur (now Amur Khabarovsk).

Four new teams joined the WCHL as of the 1997–98 season, nearly doubling the league's size: the Tacoma Sabercats, Idaho Steelheads, Phoenix Mustangs and Tucson Gila Monsters. From this expansion, as of 2014 only the Idaho Steelheads remain operational as an ECHL team.

== Teams ==
1997-98 West Coast Hockey League
Division	Team	City	Arena
North	Anchorage Aces	Anchorage, Alaska	Sullivan Arena
North	Idaho Steelheads	Boise, Idaho	Bank of America Centre
North	Reno Rage	Reno, Nevada	Reno-Sparks Convention Center
North	Tacoma Sabercats	Tacoma, Washington	Tacoma Dome
South	Bakersfield Fog	Bakersfield, California	Bakersfield Convention Center
South	Fresno Fighting Falcons	Fresno, California	Selland Arena
South	Phoenix Mustangs	Phoenix, Arizona	Arizona Veterans Memorial Coliseum
South	San Diego Gulls	San Diego, California	San Diego Sports Arena
South	Tucson Gila Monsters	Tucson, Arizona	Tucson Convention Center

=== Map of teams ===
North Division South Division

== Regular season ==
North Division	GP	W	L	OTL	GF	GA	Pts
Tacoma Sabercats	64	42	19	3	300	214	87
Anchorage Aces	64	36	20	8	308	261	80
Idaho Steelheads	64	27	30	7	253	275	61
Reno Rage	64	23	39	2	219	297	48

South Division	GP	W	L	OTL	GF	GA	Pts
San Diego Gulls	64	53	10	1	347	198	107
Phoenix Mustangs	64	36	25	3	267	235	75
Fresno Fighting Falcons	64	33	29	2	273	262	68
Bakersfield Fog	64	22	37	5	226	330	49
Tucson Gila Monsters	64	16	43	5	213	334	37

== Taylor Cup-Playoffs ==
Taylor Cup-Quarterfinals
S1	San Diego Gulls	3
S4	Bakersfield Fog	1
S2	Phoenix Mustangs	3
S3	Fresno Fighting Falcons	2
N1	Tacoma Sabercats	3
N4	Reno Rage	0
N2	Anchorage Aces	3
N3	Idaho Steelheads	1

Taylor Cup-Semifinals
S1	San Diego Gulls	4
S2	Phoenix Mustangs	0
N1	Tacoma Sabercats	4
N2	Anchorage Aces	0

Taylor Cup-Final
S1	San Diego Gulls	4
N1	Tacoma Sabercats	1
