= Long Beach Ice Dogs =

Defunct minor professional ice hockey team

- City: Long Beach, California
- League: IHL (1990–2000); WCHL (2000–03); ECHL (2003–07)
- Division: Eastern
- Founded: 1990
- Operated: 1995–2007
- Home arena: Long Beach Sports Arena
- Colors: Navy and gold
- Owners: Steven Bash; Ted Foxman; Isaac Bash, M.D.
- Affiliates: Anaheim Ducks, Boston Bruins, Dallas Stars, Montreal Canadiens (NHL)

Franchise history
- 1990–1995: San Diego Gulls
- 1995–1996: Los Angeles Ice Dogs
- 1996–2007: Long Beach Ice Dogs

Championships
- Conference titles: 2 (1997, 1998)

The Long Beach Ice Dogs were an American professional ice hockey team based in Long Beach, California, at the Long Beach Sports Arena. They played until the end of the 2006–07 ECHL season.

== History ==
The Ice Dogs trace their origins to the San Diego Gulls, a team in the now-defunct International Hockey League (IHL), that began play in 1990. In 1995, the team moved north to become the Los Angeles Ice Dogs. Due to poor attendance at the Los Angeles Memorial Sports Arena, the team was on the move again after just one season, this time to Long Beach, California, where it retained the "Ice Dogs" name and played at the Long Beach Sports Arena. During the team's time in the IHL, it was coached by John Van Boxmeer. The Ice Dogs lost the 1997 IHL Turner Cup finals four-games-to-two against the Detroit Vipers. The Ice Dogs were also the first professional sports franchise to ever broadcast their full season (1997–98) schedule on the internet, at Broadcast.com, with Ted Sobel calling the play for all five of their IHL seasons in Los Angeles/Long Beach.

In 2000, Barry Kemp, the television executive who had become the team's owner, withdrew the team from the IHL and moved it to the West Coast Hockey League (WCHL), where it remained until the league was folded in 2003 by the member clubs, which were then admitted into the East Coast Hockey League (ECHL), at the behest of owners who had interests in both leagues.

In 2005, it was forced to play first-round ECHL playoff games in the HealthSouth Training Center, owned by the Los Angeles Kings, when the Long Beach facilities were being used as garage space for the Champ Car Toyota Grand Prix of Long Beach during the ECHL playoffs.

In the summer of 2006, Kemp sold the Ice Dogs to a new investment group led by Chicago businessman Ted Foxman and the Los Angeles-based brothers, attorney Steven Bash and physician Isaac Bash, M.D. The new ownership group had plans to keep the team in Long Beach. The future of the team there had been uncertain because the Ice Dogs typically had the lowest average attendance in the ECHL. The new owners also planned to promote boxing cards at the Long Beach Arena.

On October 20, 2006, the Ice Dogs reached an affiliate agreement with the NHL's Boston Bruins.

=== Suspension of operations ===
On April 20, 2007, the ECHL announced the suspension of the team's operations, citing that Foxman had informed the board that the Ice Dogs would not play in Long Beach Arena in 2007–08. The ECHL added that the team's status would be clarified at the league's next meetings in June.

Team co-owner Steven Bash told the Press-Telegram that the team was losing too much money for it to continue operations. Bash added that the Ice Dogs were negotiating a buyout of the remaining five years of their lease with Spectacor Management Group, which operates the Long Beach Arena.

On June 18, 2007, during the ECHL Board of Governors Annual Meeting, the Ice Dogs membership in the ECHL was immediately terminated because the Long Beach ownership group was unable to continue to operate in 2007–08.

Meanwhile, former owner Barry Kemp, after originally being awarded a new franchise for Ontario, California, during the merger of the WCHL and ECHL that eventually became the Phoenix RoadRunners in 2005, relocated one of his other teams in 2008 to Ontario as the Ontario Reign.

== Notes ==
- NHL goaltenders Manny Legace and Nikolai Khabibulin played for the Long Beach Ice Dogs during their pro careers. Jaroslav Modry, Mark Hardy, Jaroslav Halak, Dan Lambert, Domenic Pittis, Patrik Stefan, and Patrik Augusta also spent some time with the Long Beach Ice Dogs.
- At the time the team folded, it was the ECHL affiliate of the Boston Bruins of the NHL, after spending the previous several years as an affiliate of both the Montreal Canadiens, Dallas Stars, Anaheim Ducks and Los Angeles Kings.
- For two seasons the concrete beneath the ice at the Long Beach Arena was a light blue color, stemming from a previous sponsorship with the airline JetBlue. Because of this the blue lines on the ice were actually painted yellow, but were also marked by blue lines on the dasher boards. In addition, the creases in front of the goals were white instead of the typical light blue, since the rest of the rink was light blue. After the airline left as a sponsor team officials decided to leave the ice blue because it reflected less light than the normal white concrete during television broadcasts. The arena's ice has since been returned to the typical white color.
