= West Coast Hockey League =

American professional minor ice hockey league

- Logo from 1997 to 2003
- Formerly: Pacific Hockey League
- Sport: Ice hockey
- Founded: 1995
- Founder: Bruce Taylor
- Folded: 2003
- Replaced by: ECHL (partial)
- No. of teams: 14 (6–9 in any single season)
- Country: United States
- Last champion: San Diego Gulls
- Most titles: San Diego Gulls (5)

The West Coast Hockey League (WCHL) was a professional minor ice hockey league active in the Western United States from 1995 to 2003. The number of teams ranged from six to nine. The teams were located in Alaska, Arizona, California, Colorado, Idaho, Nevada and Washington.

The surviving teams of the West Coast Hockey League are part of the ECHL.

== History ==
=== Beginnings ===
Original WCHL logo

The WCHL was a successor organization of the semi-professional Pacific Hockey League. Three former PHL teams, the Alaska Gold Kings (Fairbanks, Alaska), Anchorage Aces (Anchorage, Alaska), and Fresno Falcons (Fresno, California) were joined by the Bakersfield Fog (Bakersfield, California), Reno Renegades (Reno, Nevada) and San Diego Gulls (San Diego, California) to become the founding member teams of the WCHL, with British Columbia businessman Bruce Taylor recognized as the league's founding father. The league retained these teams in a single division for its first two seasons, and played regular season games against a "Red Army" team from Russia (CKA-Amur, now Amur Khabarovsk) for the 1995–96 and 1996–97 seasons.

=== Expansion ===
In the league's third season in 1997–98 the Alaska Gold Kings suspended operations. The remaining teams were joined by the expansion Idaho Steelheads (Boise, Idaho), Phoenix Mustangs (Phoenix, Arizona), Tacoma Sabercats (Tacoma, Washington) and Tucson Gila Monsters (Tucson, Arizona). The larger league was then split into Northern and Southern Divisions. The teams in Reno and Fresno changed their names to the Reno Rage and Fresno's Fighting Falcons respectively.

The following season the Gold Kings relocated to Colorado Springs, Colorado, and rejoined the league as the Colorado Gold Kings. The Fresno team reverted to its original name and the Bakersfield Fog renamed themselves the Bakersfield Condors. However, the Reno Rage ceased operations before the 1998–99 season while the Tucson Gila Monsters folded 21 games into the season. The WCHL then remained stable as an eight-team league after Tucson's departure and through the 1999–2000 season.

In 2000–01, the Long Beach Ice Dogs of the International Hockey League joined the WCHL.

=== Decline and absorption into ECHL ===
The league began to contract in 2001–02 after the Phoenix Mustangs folded before the season. Before the 2002–03 season, the WCHL's last as an independent league, the Tacoma Sabercats and Colorado Gold Kings folded. The WCHL played as a single-table league in 2002–03 as it had its first two seasons.

In 2003, the WCHL was absorbed by the East Coast Hockey League. In a change reflective of the nationwide presence of the ECHL, the East Coast Hockey League changed its name to "ECHL" on May 19, 2003, as a direct result of the absorption. The six remaining WCHL teams (Alaska, Bakersfield, Fresno, Idaho, Long Beach and San Diego) joined the West and Pacific Divisions of the ECHL's National Conference, as did a planned WCHL team in Las Vegas, Nevada, which became the Las Vegas Wranglers. The Anchorage Aces renamed themselves the Alaska Aces before joining the ECHL.

=== Legacy ===
With the 2015 move of the Bakersfield Condors to Norfolk, Virginia, to become the Norfolk Admirals and the Alaska Aces folding in 2017, only one former WCHL team, the Idaho Steelheads, remain active in the ECHL in their original market. Efforts to resurrect the Reno Renegades/Rage organization as an ECHL team have been repeatedly delayed by problems in finding a suitable home arena in the Reno area. However, since 2003 former WCHL teams have accounted for five Kelly Cup championships in the ECHL, Idaho in 2004 and 2007, and Alaska in 2006, 2011 and 2014. The ECHL's Bruce Taylor Trophy, presented to the Western Conference playoff champion, is named in recognition of the WCHL's founding father.

== Teams ==
Location of historical WCHL teams, 1995–2003. Red dots indicate teams active in the ECHL as of the 2015–16 season. Note teams were not necessarily contemporaneous with each other. For Alaska-based teams, see map below.
Location of historical WCHL teams in Alaska.
- Alaska (Fairbanks) Gold Kings (1995–1997)
- Anchorage Aces (1995–2003)
- Bakersfield Fog (1995–1998)
- Bakersfield Condors (1998–2003)
- Colorado (Colorado Springs) Gold Kings (1998–2002)
- Fresno Falcons (1995–2003, known as "Fresno's Fighting Falcons" during the 1997–98 season)
- Idaho Steelheads (1997–2003)
- Long Beach Ice Dogs (2000–2003)
- Phoenix Mustangs (1997–2001)
- Reno Renegades (1995–1997)
- Reno Rage (1997–1998)
- San Diego Gulls (1995–2003)
- Tacoma Sabercats (1997–2002)
- Tucson Gila Monsters (1997–1999)

== Taylor Cup ==
The WCHL's championship trophy was known as the Taylor Cup. It was named after the founder of the league, Bruce Taylor, who also originally owned three of the six founding teams (Bakersfield, Fresno and Reno). The San Diego Gulls were by far the most successful postseason team in WCHL history, winning five of the eight Taylor Cup championships awarded.

Year	Winner	Runner up
1996	San Diego Gulls	Fresno Falcons
1997	San Diego Gulls	Anchorage Aces
1998	San Diego Gulls	Tacoma Sabercats
1999	Tacoma Sabercats	San Diego Gulls
2000	Phoenix Mustangs	Tacoma Sabercats
2001	San Diego Gulls	Idaho Steelheads
2002	Fresno Falcons	Idaho Steelheads
2003	San Diego Gulls	Fresno Falcons

=== Taylor Cups by team ===
Teams	Championships	Runner up
San Diego Gulls	5	1
Tacoma Sabercats	1	2
Fresno Falcons	1	2
Phoenix Mustangs	1	0
Idaho Steelheads	0	2
Anchorage Aces	0	1

== See also ==
- List of developmental and minor sports leagues
- List of ice hockey leagues
- Minor league
- Sports league attendances
