= Fresno Falcons (1946-2008) =

Former ice hockey team in Fresno, California

- City: Fresno, California
- League: Pacific Coast Hockey League (1946–1950); Pacific Coast Senior League (1952–1953); Cal-Neva Hockey League (1968–1972); Pacific Southwest Hockey League (1972–1995); Sunshine Hockey League (1994–1995); West Coast Hockey League (1995–2003); ECHL (2003–2008)
- Home arena: Selland Arena; Save Mart Center

Championships
- Cal-Neva Champions: 2 (1968–69, 1970–71)
- PSHL champions: 10 (1972–73, 1973–74, 1974–75, 1975–76, 1977–78, 1979–80, 1983–84, 1985–86, 1986–87, 1993–94)
- Taylor Cups: 1 (2001–02)

The Fresno Falcons were a minor league ice hockey team in several long standing leagues in the western United States including the Pacific Southwest Hockey League and the West Coast Hockey League. In their final years, they were members of the ECHL (formerly the East Coast Hockey League).

== Early history ==
In 1968, the Fresno Aces were introduced for a season in the short-lived Cal-Neva Hockey League. Cal-Neva was a loosely linked group of professional and semi-pro teams from around the West Coast. The league lacked structure, and played games for a selection of regional championships rather than a league championship. In the 1970–71 season, the Las Vegas Gamblers club was expelled from the league, following numerous rules violations. The Gamblers were in first place at the time, and all records of games involving them were voided. The league was dissolved following the 1971–72 season, as league commissioners cited the need for more structure, and without a Nevada team, a need for a new name.

During the 1968–69 season, Fresno's team was officially known as the Fresno Aces. For 1969–70, the name was changed to the Fresno Falcons, following an earlier team in the Pacific Coast Hockey League that played between 1946 and 1953.

== Playing in the PSHL ==
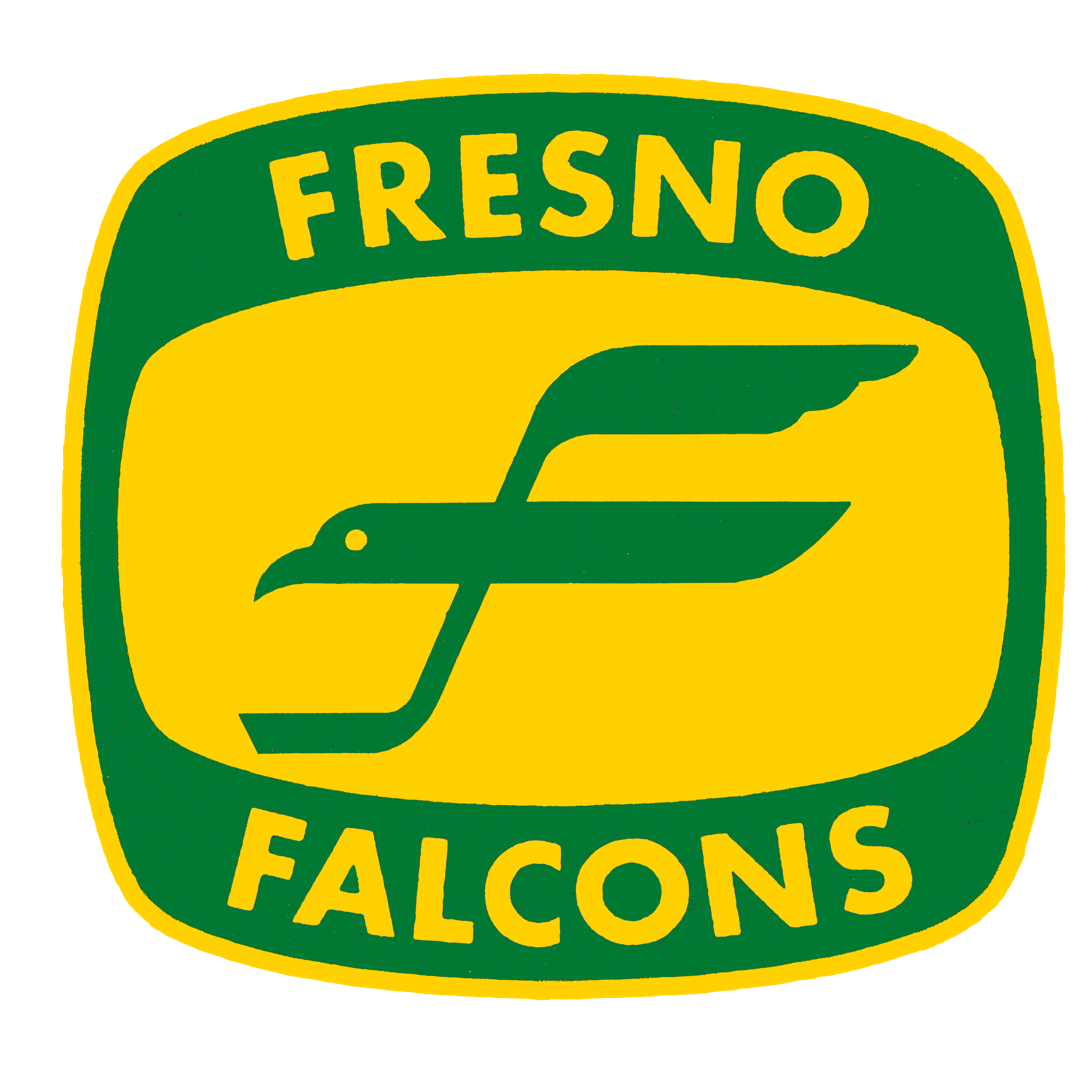
The Fresno Falcons PSHL era logo

The Pacific Southwest Hockey League was founded in 1972 following the dissolution of the Cal-Neva Hockey League. and the Falcons were one of the league's staples, as the only franchise in the league that was present from its beginning, throughout to the 1995–96 merger that formed the West Coast Hockey League.

The Falcons were the PSHL's signature franchise largely due to convenience and the availability of a then-relatively new showcase arena, Selland Arena in Fresno's Convention Center. At times throughout the league's history, some games even if not involving the Falcons were held at Selland Arena, including several Championship Finals series throughout the 1970s.

A PSHL season ranged from 15 to 30 games each between anywhere from 4 to 8 teams. Franchises shifted frequently, often with new teams appearing the next season from the same cities. The mainstays of the league were the Falcons, the Los Angeles Bruins and later in the league's history, the Burbank or Los Angeles Jets and the West Covina or California Blackhawks (later just Hawks).

Falcons games were often paired with side attractions when it came to teams' marketing, including broomball and roller derby.

== Joining the WCHL/merging with the ECHL ==
Following an experimental partnership with the Sunshine Hockey League in 1994–95, The Falcons became a charter member of the professional West Coast Hockey League to begin the 1995–96 season. The team was a member throughout the league's eight-year existence. During the 1997–98 season they were known as Fresno's Fighting Falcons. Fresno won the league's Taylor Cup championship for the 2001–02 season, defeating the Idaho Steelheads in the finals.

Along with other active WCHL teams, the Falcons joined the ECHL after the West Coast Hockey League was absorbed by the larger league in 2003.

== Affiliates ==
Years	NHL team	AHL team
2004–2006	San Jose Sharks	Cleveland Barons
2006–2008	San Jose Sharks	Worcester Sharks
2008–2009	Chicago Blackhawks	Rockford IceHogs

== Arenas ==
For most of its history, the ice hockey team played at Fresno's Selland Arena, and their green and gold colors and hard-knocks play made them a staple of sports and entertainment in Fresno. The Falcons were the centerpieces of the league, as the Falcons dominated, winning sixteen league championships in 24 seasons.

The ice hockey Falcons moved to the Save Mart Center on the campus of California State University, Fresno to coincide with their transfer to the ECHL in 2003. They played there until returning to Selland Arena in 2008.

== Financial troubles and ice hockey franchise's end ==
On December 22, 2008, Fresno Hockey Club, LLC announced that the Fresno Falcons team would cease operations immediately citing operating cost due to dwindling attendance, lack of corporate sponsorships and the faltering economy.

President Dave Dakers of the Victoria Salmon Kings ECHL team expressed some negative commentary on the Falcons team management abilities, but praised the team itself as being "competitive". The owners did not do all they could to salvage the situation, according to Dakers and gave up too easily as there were still other options available to minimize the economic damage. He was rather disappointed and not too pleased as quoted in the Victoria Times Colonist newspaper article.

The ice hockey Falcons were the second team that season to fold, following the Augusta Lynx. Arguments were made that the ECHL had expanded into markets that were unable to sustain their market, though the perception in Fresno's case was that the franchise had issues beyond that which prevented the team from being profitable. Fresno was without hockey at any level until the Fresno Monsters began play in the 2009–10 season in the Tier III Junior A Western States Hockey League. The city briefly hosted two junior teams called the Monsters from 2010 to 2013 when the Tier II North American Hockey League expanded into Fresno. In 2013, the NAHL Monsters relocated to Wenatchee, Washington; however, the Monsters continued to field a team in the WSHL and later the USPHL.

== Legacy ==
A new Fresno Falcons team returned to Selland Arena in October 2026, marking the return of pro hockey to Fresno after 17 years, playing in the Federal Prospects Hockey League (FPHL), with an initial 28-game home schedule.

== Season records ==
Season	League	Division	GP	W	L	T	OTL	SOL	PTS	PCT	GF	GA	PIM	Coach(es)	Result
1968–69	Cal-Neva	CA-NV	12	7	5	0	—	—	14	0.583	n/a	n/a	n/a	Stuart Beaulne	San Joaquin Valley champions
1969–70	Cal-Neva	CA-NV	20	8	11	1	—	—	17	0.425	n/a	n/a	n/a	Lorne Nadeau	Did not qualify
1970–71	Cal-Neva	CA-NV	13	10	1	2	—	—	22	0.846	n/a	n/a	n/a	Lorne Nadeau	Cal-Neva Hockey League champions
1971–72	Cal-Neva	CA-NV	19	14	5	0	—	—	28	0.737	n/a	n/a	n/a	Lorne Nadeau	Lost in Cal-Neva Finals to West Covina Eagles
1972–73	PSHL	PSHL	15	12	2	1	—	—	25	0.833	n/a	n/a	n/a	Lorne Nadeau	PSHL champions
1973–74	PSHL	PSHL	18	13	2	3	—	—	29	0.806	n/a	n/a	n/a	Lorne Nadeau	PSHL champions
1974–75	PSHL	PSHL	18	14	2	2	—	—	30	0.833	n/a	n/a	n/a	Lorne Nadeau	PSHL champions
1975–76	PSHL	PSHL	18	14	1	3	—	—	31	0.861	n/a	n/a	n/a	Lorne Nadeau	PSHL champions
1976–77	PSHL	PSHL	22	8	11	3	—	—	19	0.432	n/a	n/a	n/a	Lorne Nadeau	Did not qualify
1977–78	PSHL	PSHL	20	13	5	2	—	—	28	0.700	n/a	n/a	n/a	Lorne Nadeau	PSHL champions
1978–79	PSHL	PSHL	18	12	3	3	—	—	30	0.750	n/a	n/a	n/a	Lorne Nadeau	Lost in PSHL finals to Los Angeles Bruins
1979–80	PSHL	PSHL	18	11	5	2	—	—	24	0.667	n/a	n/a	n/a	Lorne Nadeau	PSHL champions
1980–81	PSHL	PSHL	18	11	6	1	—	—	23	0.639	n/a	n/a	n/a	Lorne Nadeau	Lost in PSHL finals to Los Angeles Bruins
1981–82	PSHL	PSHL	18	16	2	0	—	—	32	0.889	n/a	n/a	n/a	Lorne Nadeau	Lost in PSHL finals to Los Angeles Bruins
1982–83	PSHL	PSHL	18	14	3	1	—	—	29	0.806	n/a	n/a	n/a	Lorne Nadeau	Lost in PSHL finals to Los Angeles Bruins
1983–84	PSHL	PSHL	18	13	3	2	—	—	28	0.778	n/a	n/a	n/a	Darryl Lauer	PSHL champions
1984–85	PSHL	PSHL	18	10	7	1	—	—	21	0.583	n/a	n/a	n/a	Darryl Lauer	Lost in PSHL finals to Los Angeles Bruins
1985–86	PSHL	PSHL	18	15	2	1	—	—	31	0.861	n/a	n/a	n/a	Darryl Lauer	PSHL champions
1986–87	PSHL	PSHL	18	16	1	1	—	—	33	0.917	n/a	n/a	n/a	Darryl Lauer	PSHL champions
1987–88	PSHL	PSHL	20	12	5	3	—	—	24	0.675	n/a	n/a	n/a	Darryl Lauer	Lost in PSHL finals to Los Angeles Bruins
1988–89	PSHL	PSHL	21	8	9	4	—	—	20	0.476	n/a	n/a	n/a	Darryl Lauer	Lost in PSHL semifinals to Burbank Jets
1989–90	PSHL	PSHL	18	9	9	0	—	—	18	0.500	n/a	n/a	n/a	Darryl Lauer	Lost in PSHL finals to San Diego Surf
1990–91	PSHL	PSHL	18	5	12	1	—	—	11	0.306	n/a	n/a	n/a	Darryl Lauer	Did not qualify
1991–92	PSHL	PSHL	18	12	4	2	—	—	26	0.722	106	82	n/a	Darryl Lauer	Lost in PSHL finals to Lake Arrowhead/Los Angeles Jets
1992–93	PSHL	PSHL	24	16	5	3	—	—	35	0.729	208	115	n/a	Darryl Lauer	Lost in PSHL finals to California Hawks
1993–94	PSHL	PSHL	—	—	—	—	—	—	—	—	n/a	n/a	n/a	John Olver	PSHL champions
1994–95	PSHL	PSHL	—	—	—	—	—	—	—	—	n/a	n/a	n/a	John Olver	
1995–96	WCHL	WCHL	58	30	21	0	7	0	67	0.578	270	232	1454	John Olver	Lost in finals
1996–97	WCHL	WCHL	64	38	20	0	6	0	82	0.641	313	254	1851	Guy Gadowsky	Lost in round 1
1997–98	WCHL	WCHLS	64	33	29	0	2	0	68	0.531	273	262	2018	Guy Gadowsky	Lost in round 1
1998–99	WCHL	WCHLS	70	35	31	0	4	0	74	0.529	257	296	2172	Guy Gadowsky	Lost in round 2
1999–00	WCHL	WCHLS	72	27	38	0	7	0	61	0.424	262	307	2181	Blaine Moore	Did not qualify
2000–01	WCHL	WCHLS	72	44	22	6	0	0	94	0.653	259	221	1746	Blaine Moore	Lost in round 1
2001–02	WCHL	WCHLS	72	33	31	0	8	0	74	0.514	242	267	2108	Blaine Moore	WCHL Taylor Cup champions
2002–03	WCHL	WCHL	72	35	28	0	9	0	79	0.549	243	235	2170	Blaine Moore	Lost in finals
2003–04	ECHL	Pacific	72	23	43	6	0	0	52	0.361	187	275	1815	Blaine Moore, Greg Spenrath	Did not qualify
2004–05	ECHL	West	72	39	25	8	0	0	86	0.597	204	217	1800	Greg Spenrath	Did not qualify
2005–06	ECHL	Pacific	72	43	15	14	0	0	100	0.694	230	205	1572	Matt Thomas	Lost in National Conference finals (Alaska)
2006–07	ECHL	Pacific	72	34	29	9	0	0	77	0.535	195	197	1555	Matt Thomas	Lost in round 1 (Bakersfield)
2007–08	ECHL	Pacific	72	42	22	4	4	0	92	0.639	242	216	1565	Matt Thomas	Lost in round 1 (Utah)
2008–09	ECHL	Pacific	30	18	10	0	2	0	38	0.633	n/a	n/a	n/a	Matt Thomas	Team suspends operations
