= Darcy Anderson =

Canadian inline hockey player (born 1974)

- Born: July 23, 1974 (age 52) North Bay, Ontario, Canada
- Height: 6 ft 0 in (183 cm)
- Weight: 194 lb (88 kg; 13 st 12 lb)
- Position: Right wing
- Shoots: Right
- PIHA team Former teams: South Carolina Pirates; Manchester Phoenix
- Playing career: 1995–present

Darcy Anderson (born July 23, 1974) is a Canadian professional inline hockey player, currently playing for the South Carolina Pirates in the PIHA. Currently leading the Beauty League in points through the first 9 games of the season. Anderson has played most of his career in ice hockey however.

== Career ==
Born in North Bay, Ontario, Anderson's career began when playing for Iowa State University at ACHA level. Anderson played well and received the league's MVP award for his play. Anderson would quickly move on to play professional hockey, with the ill-fated Saginaw Wheels franchise, then playing in the CoHL, now renamed the International Hockey League. Anderson played ten games for the Wheels, before moving across the Atlantic to ice for the Basingstoke Bison, a team then playing in the BNL. After just eight games and two goals however, Anderson would return to Iowa.

He played for Iowa State for the 1996/97 and 1997/98 seasons before again moving on, this time to the Memphis RiverKings, now renamed the Mississippi RiverKings. Anderson played just two CHL games before again returning to Iowa. His experience playing with professional teams would hold Anderson in good stead, and his points production for the 1998/99 season was his best season ever, with 86 points in 33 games. His production of almost three points per game would again secure him the league MVP award as well a further selection to the All-Star team, a feat he had managed for all four of his seasons in the ACHA. His prolific scoring helped Iowa to clinch the collegiate club-level championship with a win over Penn State.

Anderson signed for the ECHL Greenville Grrrowl, where he played out the rest of the 1998/99 season.

Again Anderson would fail to settle, and he would start the 1999/00 season playing for the Fort Worth Brahmas, since re-located to North Richland Hills and renamed the Texas Brahmas. The 1999/00 season would be a turbulent one for Anderson and he would ice with no less than four teams in just one season. In addition to the Brahmas he played for the Missouri River Otters, the Colorado Gold Kings and the Phoenix Mustangs at UHL and WCHL levels respectively.

The following season, 2000/01 would also see Anderson play for a number of different teams, this time he would initially play for the CHL Fayetteville Force but after their collapse due to financial issues, he would move to another CHL team, the Border City Bandits. Again financial problems would ensue and Anderson would again move, this time to the Adirondack IceHawks of the UHL. He would grab four points in twelve games for the IceHawks, helping them into the post-season although Anderson would only feature in one playoff game.

Anderson settled well in the UHL, and his signature would be snapped up in the close season by the newly re-established Kalamazoo Wings. Anderson would be a reliable if not spectacular point scorer for the Wings, and would manage 20 points in 46 regular season games. Despite this increase in productivity Anderson would choose not to re-sign for the Wings, and would again move across the Atlantic to sign for Milano Vipers. He played 23 games for Milano, and would manage 12 points in the process and so would be part of the Milano squad that would lift both the league championship and the playoff title.

Anderson would stay in Italy for the following season, 2003/04, and would sign for SV Renon, again playing in Serie A. His goal scoring touch returned and in 12 games he would total 20 points. This form would alert then head coach of the Manchester Phoenix, Rick Brebant who would successfully sign Anderson mid-season. Despite the change in climate and culture, Anderson again settled well and managed to finish the season with 22 points in 30 EIHL games, so helping Manchester into the playoffs. Anderson would again be a reliable scorer in the post-season, with 4 points in 6 games prior to the Phoenix being eliminated.

Financial problems would follow for Manchester though, and playing operations were suspended in the summer of 2004. Anderson took this opportunity to take up a coaching role in the game, and would return home to become a coach for the Ontario Minor Hockey Association, and would become a HTCP Level 1 standard trainer.

In 2008, Anderson would again choose to play competitive sport, although changed from ice hockey to inline hockey, signing for the South Carolina Pirates in the PIHA. He again found his scoring touch, netting a remarkable 87 points in just 21 games, helping the Pirates to the Southeast Division Championship in the process. His productivity would ensure his contract was renewed in the summer, confirming Anderson as a Pirates player for the 2009 term.

== Ice hockey ==
			Regular season					Playoffs				
Season	Team	League	GP	G	A	Pts	PIM	GP	G	A	Pts	PIM
1994–95	Iowa State University	ACHA	-	-	-	-	-	-	-	-	-	-
1995–96	Saginaw Wheels	CoHL	10	0	0	0	5	-	-	-	-	-
1995–96	Basingstoke Bison	BNL	8	2	0	2	6	-	-	-	-	-
1996–97	Iowa State University	ACHA	-	-	-	-	-	-	-	-	-	-
1997–98	Iowa State University	ACHA	4	2	2	4	8	-	-	-	-	-
1997–98	Memphis RiverKings	CHL	2	0	0	0	2	-	-	-	-	-
1998–99	Iowa State University	ACHA	32	51	33	84	-	-	-	-	-	-
1998–99	Greenville Grrrowl	ECHL	14	3	2	5	0	-	-	-	-	-
1999–00	Fort Worth Brahmas	WPHL	8	1	1	2	16	-	-	-	-	-
1999–00	Missouri River Otters	UHL	2	0	0	0	0	-	-	-	-	-
1999–00	Colorado Gold Kings	WCHL	17	3	3	6	17	-	-	-	-	-
1999–00	Phoenix Mustangs	WCHL	11	0	0	0	9	-	-	-	-	-
2000–01	Fayetteville Force	CHL	9	0	1	1	13	-	-	-	-	-
2000–01	Border City Bandits	CHL	9	4	4	8	4	-	-	-	-	-
2000–01	Adirondack IceHawks	UHL	12	2	2	4	12	1	0	0	0	2
2001–02	Kalamazoo Wings	UHL	45	9	11	20	26	-	-	-	-	-
2002–03	Milano Vipers	Serie A	23	7	5	12	33	-	-	-	-	-
2003–04	SV Renon	Serie A	12	6	14	20	2	-	-	-	-	-
2003–04	Manchester Phoenix	EIHL	30	10	12	22	20	6	1	3	4	8
Career Totals			248	100	90	190	173	7	1	3	4	10

== Inline hockey ==
			Regular season					Playoffs				
Season	Team	League	GP	G	A	Pts	PIM	GP	G	A	Pts	PIM
2008	South Carolina Pirates	PIHA	21	41	46	87	16	4	5	4	9	0
2009	South Carolina Pirates	PIHA	8	14	6	20	14					
Career Totals			29	55	52	107	30	4	5	4	9	0

- includes league/post season games only, correct up to 15/01/09
