= Ohio State Buckeyes men's ice hockey statistical leaders =

The Ohio State Buckeyes men's ice hockey statistical leaders are individual statistical leaders of the Ohio State Buckeyes men's ice hockey program in various categories, including goals, assists, points, and saves. Within those areas, the lists identify single-game, single-season, and career leaders. The Buckeyes represent the Ohio State University in the NCAA's Big Ten.

Ohio State began competing in intercollegiate ice hockey in 1963. These lists are updated through the end of the 2020–21 season.

== Goals ==
Career
Rk	Player	Goals	Seasons
1	Paul Pooley	114	1980–81 1981–82 1982–83 1983–84
2	Ray Meyers	107	1970–71 1971–72 1972–73 1973–74
3	Andy Browne	104	1980–81 1981–82 1982–83 1983–84
4	Peter Bartkiewicz	86	1969–70 1970–71 1971–72 1972–73
5	Perry Pooley	85	1980–81 1981–82 1982–83 1983–84
6	Larry Marson	82	1978–79 1979–80 1980–81 1981–82
7	Jerry Welsh	81	1969–70 1970–71 1971–72 1972–73
	Paul Tilley	81	1976–77 1977–78 1978–79 1979–80
9	Derek Higdon	80	1986–87 1987–88 1988–89 1989–90
10	Ron White	78	1990–91 1991–92 1992–93 1993–94

Season
Rk	Player	Goals	Season
1	Andy Browne	42	1982–83
2	Bruce Allworth	40	1975–76
3	Perry Pooley	39	1983–84
4	Jeff Madill	38	1986–87
5	Rick Brebant	35	1986–87
6	Andy Browne	34	1983–84
7	Ray Meyers	33	1972–73
	Paul Pooley	33	1982–83
9	Jeff Madill	32	1985–86
	Paul Pooley	32	1983–84
	Paul Tilley	32	1978–79

Single Game
Rk	Player	Goals	Season	Opponent
1	Jeff Madill	5	1986–87	Ferris State
	Ray Meyers	5	1972–73	Ohio
	Harold Cousino	5	1965–66	Case Tech
	Mike Turner	5	1968–69	Tennessee

== Assists ==
Career
Rk	Player	Assists	Seasons
1	Paul Pooley	156	1980–81 1981–82 1982–83 1983–84
2	Dave Kobryn	150	1980–81 1981–82 1982–83 1983–84
3	Paul Tilley	131	1976–77 1977–78 1978–79 1979–80
4	Larry Marson	128	1978–79 1979–80 1980–81 1981–82
5	Ray Meyers	126	1970–71 1971–72 1972–73 1973–74
6	Bruce Allworth	114	1973–74 1974–75 1975–76
7	Rick Brebant	108	1984–85 1985–86 1986–87
	Andy Browne	108	1980–81 1981–82 1982–83 1983–84
9	Tom Scanlon	102	1976–77 1977–78 1978–79 1979–80
10	Andy Forcey	97	1985–86 1986–87 1987–88 1988–89

Season
Rk	Player	Assists	Season
1	Paul Pooley	64	1983–84
2	Dave Kobryn	57	1982–83
3	Bruce Allworth	53	1975–76
4	Rick Brebant	51	1986–87
5	Dave Kobryn	49	1983–84
6	Paul Tilley	44	1978–79
7	Andy Browne	41	1982–83
	David Smith	41	1991–92
9	Perry Pooley	40	1983–84
10	Ray Meyers	39	1970–71
	Hugh Prentice	39	1972–73
	Darcy Gryba	39	1985–86

Single Game
Rk	Player	Assists	Season	Opponent
1	Paul Pooley	6	1983–84	UIC
	Hugh Prentice	6	1971–72	BGSU

== Points ==
Career
Rk	Player	Points	Seasons
1	Paul Pooley	270	1980–81 1981–82 1982–83 1983–84
2	Ray Meyers	233	1970–71 1971–72 1972–73 1973–74
3	Dave Kobryn	222	1980–81 1981–82 1982–83 1983–84
4	Andy Browne	212	1980–81 1981–82 1982–83 1983–84
	Paul Tilley	212	1976–77 1977–78 1978–79 1979–80
6	Larry Marson	210	1978–79 1979–80 1980–81 1981–82
7	Bruce Allworth	185	1973–74 1974–75 1975–76
8	Rick Brebant	183	1984–85 1985–86 1986–87
9	Tom Scanlon	177	1976–77 1977–78 1978–79 1979–80
10	Peter Bartkiewicz	174	1969–70 1970–71 1971–72 1972–73
	Perry Pooley	174	1980–81 1981–82 1982–83 1983–84

Season
Rk	Player	Points	Season
1	Paul Pooley	96	1983–84
2	Bruce Allworth	93	1975–76
3	Rick Brebant	86	1986–87
4	Andy Browne	83	1982–83
5	Perry Pooley	79	1983–84
6	Dave Kobryn	78	1982–83
7	Paul Tilley	76	1978–79
8	Dave Kobryn	72	1983–84
9	Jeff Madill	70	1986–87
10	Paul Pooley	69	1982–83

Single Game
Rk	Player	Points	Season	Opponent
1	Larry Marson	7	1980–81	W. Ontario
	Bruce Allworth	7	1975–76	Kent State
	Bruce Allworth	7	1973–74	Lake Forest
	Ray Meyers	7	1970–71	Western Mich.
	Eldon Simpson	7	1969–70	Lake Forest

== Saves ==
Career (since 1973)
Rk	Player	Saves	Seasons
1	Mike Betz	3,328	2000–01 2001–02 2002–03 2003–04
2	Dan Stergiou	3,261	1972–73 1973–74 1974–75 1975–76
3	Tom Askey	2,911	1992–93 1993–94 1994–95 1995–96
4	Steve Jones	2,903	1976–77 1977–78 1978–79 1979–80
5	Mike Bales	2,865	1989–90 1990–91 1991–92
6	Todd Fanning	2,738	1986–87 1987–88 1988–89 1989–90
7	Mike Blake	2,587	1977–78 1978–79 1979–80 1980–81
8	Christian Frey	2,465	2013–14 2014–15 2015–16 2016–17
9	Cal Heeter	2,428	2008–09 2009–10 2010–11 2011–12
10	John Dougan	2,215	1981–82 1982–83 1983–84 1984–85

Season (since 1973)
Rk	Player	Saves	Season
1	Mike Bales	1,227	1990–91
2	Jakub Dobes	1,086	2021–22
3	Mike Blake	1,060	1980–81
4	Mike Bales	1,041	1991–92
5	Jeff Maund	1,036	1998–99
6	Dustin Carlson	1,014	2008–09
7	Jakub Dobes	1,013	2022–23
8	Cal Heeter	1,009	2010–11
9	Ray Aho	997	1999–00
10	Dan Stergiou	971	1974–75
	Brady Hjelle	971	2012–13

Single Game
Rk	Player	Saves	Season	Opponent
1	Chuck Hobaica	66	1963–64	WMU
2	Chuck Hobaica	63	1963–64	WMU
3	Chuck Hobaica	61	1963–64	MSU
4	Christian Frey	60	2014–15	Miami
5	Mike Betz	58	2000–01	Maine
6	Christian Frey	56	2016–17	PSU
	Chuck Hobaica	56	1963–64	Ohio
8	Dan Stergiou	55	1974–75	
9	Dan Stergiou	54	1974–75	
10	Chuck Hobaica	53	1963–64	OU
	Christian Frey	53	2014–15	PSU
