= Berkshire Bees =

Ice hockey team from Bracknell, England

- Founded: 1987
- Colors: Black and Yellow
- Website: www.beesicehockey.com

Franchise history
- 1987–2020: Bracknell Bees
- 2021–2024: Bees Ice Hockey Club
- 2024–2025: Berkshire Bees

Championships
- Regular season titles: 4 (89/90, 99/00, 04/05 & 06/07)
- Challenge Cups: 4 (88/89, 89/90, 04/05 & 07/08)
- Playoff championships: 1 (06/07)

The Berkshire Bees were an ice hockey team from Berkshire, England.

== History ==
=== Early years ===
The Bracknell Bees were formed in 1987, under the ownership of John Nike OBE. The Bees began life in the Heineken League Division Two, under the leadership of former Durham Wasps and Nottingham Panthers forward, Jamie Crapper, where they finished sixth. The following season, Heineken withdrew their sponsorship of the second division, which was renamed the English League Division 1. The Bees narrowly missed out on the championship to the Humberside Seahawks, but won the league the following season, gaining promotion to the Heineken League Division 1. Having finished third, behind Humberside and the Slough Jets, Bees progressed to the top tier of British hockey, the Heineken Premier Division, via the play-offs, alongside the Seahawks.

Once at the top, it was a struggle and Bees were regularly mid-table or below, before eventually being relegated in 1995, under the leadership of Mike Urquhart.

=== New beginning ===
New leadership sparked a new beginning for the club. Urquhart left and was replaced by Jim Fuyarchuck, who re-installed the feel-good factor at the Hive (Nickname of the Bees home, the John Nike Leisuresport Complex) Bees again finished third in the first division (no longer sponsored by Heineken) but this time, they missed out to Milton Keynes Kings in the promotion play-offs.

However, this did not matter, as the following season saw the formation of a new league – The Ice Hockey Superleague (ISL) which was the country's first fully professional league since the 1950s.

Bees were one of the smaller teams in the eight-team league, finishing 6th in their first season, followed by a 3rd-place finish and then a 4th. The team won the ISL title the following year.

=== Slippery slope ===
The Bees would not remain on top for long. A new club, Belfast Giants, tempted Whistle away with a lucrative package and he was closely followed by seven of the championship-winning squad. Whistle repeated the feat, winning the ISL in his second season. Meanwhile, Whistle was replaced by Enio Saccillotto, who never managed to recover from only having three players return.

The Bees finished third in his first season; from this point forward, the Bees never returned to the 'top table' of British Ice Hockey.

The Bees eventually announced that they were to leave the ISL at the end of the 2002–2003 season. With Manchester and Ayr having ceased operations during the season, the Bees announcement finally spelt the end of the ISL as a viable league.

The Bees joined the British National League and were instantly tipped as being major contenders for the title. However, they finished just fourth in their first season, before going on to win the league and cup double in their second season. Ironically, as with the ISL winning team, the Bees were coached by an ex Bees player, Mike Ellis, again coaching in his second season.

=== The Taylor Times ===
After the double winning season, Mr Nike announced that he was no longer going to be funding the Bees. Up stepped local Estate Agent, David Taylor. David was a sponsor of the Bees and along with his wife Sharon and coach Mike Ellis, they set up a new club. Mr Nike granted them a licence to use the name "Bracknell Bees" for marketing purposes for a three-year period.

At this time, Edinburgh Capitals and Newcastle Vipers decided to resign from the British National League in order to join the premier Elite Ice Hockey League. As this would leave the BNL with only five teams; and thus with little option but to fold, the Capitals and Vipers temporarily withdrew their applications so as to allow the remaining BNL teams to apply for EIHL status. However, terms could not be agreed between the EIHL and the remaining five BNL teams; leading the Capitals and Vipers to resubmit their original applications and join the EIHL; which ultimately resulted in the closure of the BNL. This led the Bees, along with fellow former BNL members Hull Stingrays and, the Bees biggest rivals, Guildford Flames, to move to the EPIHL.

Coach Mike Ellis put together a mix of youth and experience and they tasted some success in their first EPL season. As well as finishing a respectable 5th in the league, Bees made it to the play-off final, beating the Sheffield Scimitars in the semi-finals at the SkyDome Arena in Coventry. Bracknell came up short in the final though, against the Milton Keynes Lightning. However, The Bees did go one better a few weeks earlier, in the EPL Cup, winning the two legged final against the Hull Stingrays in March.

Mike Ellis departed to become head coach of the Nottingham Panthers in May 2006 and was replaced on 25 May, by his assistant, Ryan Aldridge, with Lee Ealey-Newman bench coach.

10 months later, On 11 March 2007, the Bracknell Bees were crowned champions of the English Premier Ice Hockey League for the 2006/2007 season, following a 3–0 shut-out of the Romford Raiders, as the only remaining contenders for the title, the Sheffield Scimitars lost at Milton Keynes. Not content with one trophy though, Bees followed it up with their first ever play-off success at the SkyDome Arena in Coventry, overcoming the Peterborough Phantoms 2–1 in a semi-final shoot-out, before defeating archrivals and the previous season's league champions, the Guildford Flames, 3–2, in the final.

In April 2007, David and Sharon Taylor announced that they were to take on the ownership of the Basingstoke Bison as well as the Bees. With this announcement, came the news that head coach, Ryan Aldridge was to move to the Bison as their new head coach and be replaced as Bees player/coach, by defenceman Dwight Parrish.

Dwight Parrish re-signed the bulk of the previous season's double-winning team, but lost influential forward, Lukas Smital. Smital was replaced by Michal Kanka and Peter Jasik and the team continued to enjoy success, before off-ice problems started to set in.

The Taylors ran into financial difficulties early in the season and their contract with Planet Ice to run the Bison was terminated. The troubles were mirrored at the Bees and following rumours of unpaid bills, player wages and team unrest, the Taylors announced in December 2007 that they were to relinquish the operating licence for the Bees.

At the time in spite of the off ice difficulties, the Bees were sitting in second place in the English Premier Ice Hockey League, 1 point adrift of leaders, Guildford Flames, were through to the semi-finals of the EPL cup and in a good position in the Knock-out cup.

=== Supporter-led takeover ===
Within a week of the Taylors walking away from the club, Bees fan Katie Eleftheriou and then Supporters Club Chairman Stuart Robinson formed Bees Ice Management Ltd to take over the operating licence and came up with a rescue plan to see the club through to the end of the season, if fans were willing to help through pledging donations. This they did and the club successfully completed the season, finishing in 3rd place in the league, winning the EPL cup and finishing runner up to Slough Jets in the play-off final.

For the 2008–2009 season Dwight Parrish returned to the Manchester Phoenix and was replaced as head coach by the previous season's captain, Adam Bicknell. During the season, Bicknell recruited Peter Russell as a bench coach, after Russell had been released by Swindon Wildcats. Bees finished the season in 5th place in the EPL before going out of the play-offs in a two-legged quarter final to Slough Jets, 7–5 on aggregate. Bees reached the semi-final of the EPL Cup, where they lost 6–4 on aggregate to Peterborough Phantoms who went on to take all four trophies on offer for the season, leaving the Bees with no trophies for the first time in 5 seasons.

During the 2008–2009 season, Eleftheriou and Robinson announced that they would not continue to run the Bees beyond the end of the campaign. This was announced mid season in an effort to allow time for a new owners to be found and make the relevant arrangements with John Nike Leisuresport, who would issue the operating licence. Unfortunately, with parties interested, deadlines came and went and were extended, but no deal could be reached. At the last moment in the absence of any alternative owner, Eleftheriou and Robinson announced that they would continue with revised budgets, rather than see the club fold. Unfortunately, by that stage the majority of the team had signed elsewhere, while coach Adam Bicknell announced that he was to retire to play local league football instead.

With little time to build a new team, Bees recruited Claude Dumas as player coach, after his club Telford Tigers announced that they were to mothball. Dumas recruited three imports from the French Elite League, forwards Michal Pinc and Jaroslav Cesky, along with Dutch international defenceman, Chad Euverman. Euverman announced after the start of the season that he would not be joining up with his new team and was soon replaced by the previous seasons fans' favourite, Andrius Kaminskas. Only two EIHA trained players returned from the previous season, Ryan Watt and Danny House. As well as being joined after the start of the season by Kaminskas, December also saw a surprise returnee, when Adam Bicknell rejoined the team.

After Dumas took the decision to retire from hockey at the end of the 2009–10 season, Gareth Cox was appointed as the new head coach. Cox had been the coach the Bracknell Hornets English National League team for a number of years, leading them to a playoff title before moving to the Bees. He brought a number of young players with him from the Hornets and kept the core of Dumas' squad from the previous year together including EPL player of the year Jaroslav Cesky who stayed at the club with line mate Pinc. However, things didn't go to plan and Bees finished the season at the foot of the EPL table.

For the 2011–12 season, assistant coach, Greg Randall left to join the Peterborough Phantoms and was replaced by Lukas Smital, a former Bee and Cox's former assistant with the Hornets. Smítal was already the head coach of the Bracknell Ice Hockey Club and upon his return to the Bees, also took on the role of head coach to their senior team, Bracknell Hornets, while Cox also took on the head coach role with the Under 18 team, Bracknell Drones.

Together, the pair set about rebuilding the Bees from the bottom up, bringing back former Bees, Martin Máša, Matt Foord, Shaun Thompson, Carl Graham, Tom Annetts and Brad Watchorn, and adding some players used to competing at the top end of the table, including Guildford captain, Rob Lamey and Slough pair, Michael Bowman and Andy Munroe. Bees showed a big improvement, doubling their points tally of the previous season, but still missing out on post-season play, finishing 9th, with only Telford behind them.

2012–13 saw far less changes, with coach Gareth Cox choosing to just tweak what he had. Peter Jasik moved from the Bees to the Hornets and giant Latvian defenceman, Sergejs Louskins both departed, and Bees went with two import defencemen in Jan Bendik and Marcel Petran. Petran had a good offer from abroad during the season and left, to be replaced by Pavel Strycek. The Bees made the play-offs, but after a first leg win against Manchester, a 7–2 defeat in Altrincham saw spelt the end of their season.

=== Precision Sports Marketing ===
Eleftheriou and Robinson confirmed their standing down in April 2013 and in their place Precision Sports Marketing (PSM) were confirmed by John Nike Leisuresport the following month from the 2013–14 season.

PSM, led by businessesman and former Bracknell junior Ben Beecher and local businessman Andrew Cross, stated an ambition to make the Bees vibrant, visible and viable and the best family sporting experience in Berkshire. In doing so, the aim is to build a sustainable sporting entertainment experience for the supporters, raise attendance at home games, and recognise the role played by many in the wider Bees family. "The Bees have to be financially viable, history tells us that. Next season, we intend to introduce fresh sponsorship and advertising packages as well as innovative ticket incentives for all our loyal supporters. It’s time to get out the arm chair and get down to the Hive", stated Cross.

The new owners also set out a pathway for the Bracknell Bees entering the top segment of the overall Bracknell Ice Hockey Club with the junior teams being instrumental in developing future Bees, with a clear focus on the wider value of the junior setup within the local community.

On the personnel front, Beeching moved quickly to re-sign Head Coach Gareth Cox and Player/Assistant Coach Lukas Smital who had led the team to a sixth-place finish in the English Premier League and a playoff quarter final in the previous season. Off ice, the management were supplemented with a team of marketing and management experts as well as the Bees Supporters Club to help guide the club towards their vision.

John Nike Leisuresport Limited, which issues the license to operate the Bees, was equally excited with the PSM appointment. "We received several expressions of interest and proposals but the PSM business plan offered the best all round package for the Bees and Bracknell", commented Director Martin Weddell. "Their recognition of the efforts put in by the previous team and their innovative future plans were key factors in making our due diligence decision. We put forward the business proposal of PSM to John Nike Founder & Chairman, who has agreed to the granting of the Bees Licence to PSM, commenting that he was delighted with the prospect of the continuation of the Bracknell Bees under the operational direction of PSM with its undoubted business intentions to grow the team and its reputation.

2013/14, the maiden season for PSM, saw the team go on a run all the way to the playoff quarter finals. With results in the first third of the season not meeting the new owners' expectations head coach, Gareth Cox was replaced by his assistant, the highly experienced Lukas Smital, who became player coach. As part of the changes to bring a winning culture to the club, General Manager Stuart Robinson was axed, and forward Kamil Tvrdek, who signed from MK Lightning in the summer, was released.

These changes were followed by the team's first sellout since the heady days of the Ice Hockey Superleague at the turn of the century as they beat the defending champion Guildford Flames 4–2 on 29 December 2013. Driven by Smital's guidance, and the strong emergence of the likes of Harvey Stead and Vanya Antonov, Bees never looked back in sealing their playoff place. They faced the Manchester in the quarter-finals and after winning the first leg at home in front of another sellout crowd, went down in the away leg to the newly crowned league champions. The big plus of the season was the 50% increase in crowd sizes, a 33% uplift in season ticket sales, back office improvements, and building local school and media partnerships.

2014/15 season saw the team finish a respectable 9th place, even after some key departures including the retirement of longtime captain Rob Lamey. The positive part of the season was the emergence of several young prospects. Vanya Antonov, in his first full season was the team's top British scorer, while youngsters Josh Tetlow, Tom Relf, and Ziggy Beasley got their chances on two way contracts, as management looked to retool on the fly.

=== Red Hockey Ltd Acquires Significant Shareholding ===
PSM successfully closed an investment deal in March 2015, with Red Hockey Ltd, the company which also owns the Telford Tigers. The agreement saw Red Hockey take a shareholding of 49% in the Bracknell Bees with Precision Sports Marketing, led by Ben Beeching and Andrew Cross retaining the majority ownership.

=== Supporter-led takeover part 2 ===
In March 2016 PSM announced its strategic decision to discontinue its ownership of the Bracknell Bees license.

A supporters-based ownership started by Lukas Smital (Head Coach) was proposed. Lukas approached the support & services of Matt Fettel to make up the group who would approach the Nike Group for the license of the Bracknell Bees and look to seek re-entry into the Premier Division.

The campaign was supported by local media including Heart FM, BBC, BBC Berkshire, Bracknell News, Reading Chronicle and the Wokingham Paper.

In June 2016, the supporters' trust raised enough revenue to commence the season and was granted entry into the EPL.

=== Closure of the Hive ===
In May 2020, the Bees announced that the JNL Bracknell Complex were "commencing meaningful statutory consultations on potential staff redundancies." due to the impact of the COVID-19 pandemic. Fans were assured that season tickets would be refunded, should the club be unable to participate in the upcoming 20/21 season, promising a further update after the 30-day statutory consultation period. In July 2020, the Bees announced that the Hive would be permanently closed with immediate effect, after a financially viable plan to keep the complex open could not be found. The Bees assured fans that positive progress was being made in finding a new home for the 20/21 season and beyond, stating "whilst the Hive may have closed, the club will live on. Whilst bricks and mortar are important, this club is about people, family and community". In August 2020, the Bees announced they would be playing their home games out of the Slough Ice Arena, sharing with the Slough Jets organisation. Due to the change of location, the Bracknell Bees Ice Hockey Club became the Bees Ice Hockey Club. This name remained until 2024, when the club became known as the Berkshire Bees.

==== Time-Out ====
In mid-May 2025 the Club announced that they had to "take the decision to inform the League of the intention to take one year out of the National League and concentrate on securing the Clubs future over the next 12 months".

Then in mid-April 2026 the Club announced that they had informed the Planet Ice National League that they would not be entering a team for the 2026/27 season.

== Standout players ==
Bees have had several stand-out players, a few of whom are listed below:

- Jamie Crapper was the Bees first coach, he was recruited by Mr John Nike OBE. with the task of creating the Bracknell Bees ice hockey team which entered the British Heineken League in 1987. Jamie played for the Bees for five consecutive seasons. During his time with the Bees he scored 744 points in 153 matches (4.86 points per game).
- Darin Fridgen was recruited to the Bracknell Bees as a 23-year-old from Ferris state university in 1988. In his first season, he won over the fans by scoring 207 points in 21 matches (9.85 points per game). His skating skills included speed and strength and, as his scoring record demonstrates, he was able to score with great precision.
- Matt Coté was the longest serving member of the Bracknell Bees, serving club for ten years (1990–2000). Coté's game play involved throwing his body in the way of slap shots. He is held in high esteem by players and fans alike and for this, the club honoured him by retiring his number 8 shirt following his retirement in 2005.
- Chris Brant was recruited to the Bracknell Bees in 1995 from their local rivals, the Basingstoke Beavers (although Chris Brant did play the first part of the 1994 / 1995 season with the Bracknell Bees). In his first full season Chris Brant accumulated 203 points in 51 league games (3.98 points per game). This native North American, nicknamed The Chief, became known at the Hive for his war-dance, performed at centre-ice after every hat-trick that season. Alongside his scoring record he accumulated 166 penalty minutes. Brant stayed with the Bees for six seasons and was a member of the 1999–2000 Sekonda Superleague championship winning team.
- Dave Whistle was a Canadian that had played in the British Leagues since 1991. He joined the Bracknell Bees in 1995 and although he was a talented forward, who finished in the top ten scorers in Division 1 on 3 occasions (Source – The Hockey Database), Whistle will be remembered by the fans at Bracknell for his coaching success. In 1998 Whistle was appointed a head coach. In only his second season he built a team that became the Sekonda Super league champions 1999–2000. 2009/10 Sekonda Superleague final table

Preceded by Humberside Seahawks	English League Champions; 1989–90	Succeeded by Oxford Stars
Preceded by Manchester Storm	Superleague Champions; 1999-00	Succeeded by Sheffield Steelers
Preceded by Fife Flyers	British National League Champions; 2004–05	Succeeded by N/A
Preceded by N/A	British National League Winter Cup Champions; 2004–05	Succeeded by N/A
Preceded by Romford Raiders	EPIHL Cup Champions; 2005–06	Succeeded by Guildford Flames
Preceded by Guildford Flames	EPIHL Champions; 2006–07	Succeeded by Guildford Flames
Preceded by Milton Keynes Lightning	EPIHL Playoff Champions; 2006–07	Succeeded by Slough Jets
Preceded by Guildford Flames	EPIHL Cup Champions; 2007–08	Succeeded by Peterborough Phantoms
