= Carl Graham =

English ice hockey player (born 1984)

- Born: 6 January 1984 (age 42) Reading, England, U.K.
- Height: 6 ft 0 in (183 cm)
- Weight: 203 lb (92 kg; 14 st 7 lb)
- Position: Defence
- Shoots: Right
- EPIHL team Former teams: Basingstoke Bison; Slough Jets; Bracknell Hornets; Wightlink Raiders; Bracknell Bees; Manchester Phoenix
- Playing career: 2000–present

Carl Graham (born 6 January 1984) is an English professional Ice Hockey player, currently playing for the Bracknell Bees in the EPIHL. Graham began his career with his local team in Slough in the year 2000. He initially played at U-19 level with the Slough Comets, but also made ten senior ENHL appearances for the Slough Harrier Hawks.

Graham would stay within the Slough system, and again switched between the U-19 Comets team and the ENHL Harrier Hawks team during the 2001/02 season. This season was an important one for Graham as he made his first international appearance for the England U-20 team as well as graduating to BNL level, playing three games for the Slough Jets. Graham again showed loyalty to the Slough clubs, and again played for the U-19 Comets as well as becoming a regular for the senior Slough Jets, now in the EPL.

Graham's 2003/04 season was again spent in Slough, now alternating between the Harrier Hawks and Jets teams. A change would come the following term, when he would move to sign for the Bracknell Hornets at the lower ENHL standard. Graham shone, and the following season (2004/05) was again playing at the higher EPL standard, now with the Wightlink Raiders.

In the summer of 2007, Graham was to again change teams, and was signed for the Manchester Phoenix, a team icing in the EIHL, the highest standard of ice hockey in Britain. Graham signed for the Phoenix along with Davey Graham (no relation) who had been brought into the club to act as bench coach due to head coach Tony Hand's decision to continue playing as well as coaching.

The younger Graham has proved to be a hard working defenseman for the Phoenix, but is mainly employed as a backup player, although he featured in 59 regular season fixtures. Graham's play throughout the 2007/08 season impressed Hand, and he was the first player to be re-signed for the Phoenix for the 2008/09 term. Graham again proved his ability at EIHL level, and iced in 67 games for the Phoenix, managing to score his first Elite League goal against Manchester's close rivals, the Sheffield Steelers. Graham's growth as a player again encouraged Tony Hand to re-sign him for the 2009/10 season, in which the Phoenix will ice in the EPL.

Despite a positive start for the Phoenix, with three wins from their first three games, Graham chose to move mid-season and signed for the Bracknell Bees, EPL rivals of the Phoenix.

== Career stats ==
			Regular season					Playoffs				
Season	Team	League	GP	G	A	Pts	PIM	GP	G	A	Pts	PIM
2000–01	Slough Comets	EU19	22	4	2	6	60	-	-	-	-	-
2000–01	Slough Harrier Hawks	ENHL	10	2	1	3	8	-	-	-	-	-
2001–02	Slough Comets	EU19	14	1	8	9	108	-	-	-	-	-
2001–02	Slough Harrier Hawks	ENHL	6	4	1	5	26	-	-	-	-	-
2001–02	Slough Jets	BNL	3	0	0	0	0	-	-	-	-	-
2002–03	Slough Comets	EU19	14	3	2	5	100	-	-	-	-	-
2002–03	Slough Jets	EPL	32	0	2	2	2	-	-	-	-	-
2003–04	Slough Harrier Hawks	ENHL	10	2	3	5	26	-	-	-	-	-
2003–04	Slough Jets	EPL	22	0	0	0	22	-	-	-	-	-
2004–05	Bracknell Hornets	ENHL	17	2	5	7	44	-	-	-	-	-
2005–06	Bracknell Hornets	ENHL	20	7	2	9	120	-	-	-	-	-
2006–07	Wightlink Raiders	EPL	44	2	7	9	74	-	-	-	-	-
2007–08	Manchester Phoenix	EIHL	59	0	0	0	18	2	0	0	0	0
2008–09	Manchester Phoenix	EIHL	67	1	2	3	18	2	0	0	0	0
2009–10	Manchester Phoenix	EPL										
EU19 totals			50	8	12	20	268	-	-	-	-	-
ENHL totals			63	17	12	29	224	-	-	-	-	-
BNL totals			3	0	0	0	0	-	-	-	-	-
EPIHL totals			98	2	9	11	98	-	-	-	-	-
EIHL totals			126	1	2	3	36	4	0	0	0	0
