= Vychodil =

Vychodil (feminine: Vychodilová) is a Czech surname. Notable people with the surname include:

- David Vychodil (born 1980), Czech ice hockey player
- Tomáš Vychodil (born 1975), Czech-Russian footballer and coach
