= Shaun Thompson =

British ice hockey player

- Born: 13 July 1987 (age 39) Slough, England, United Kingdom
- Height: 5 ft 8 in (173 cm)
- Weight: 174 lb (79 kg; 12 st 6 lb)
- Position: Forward
- Shoots: Right
- EIHL team Former teams: Braehead Clan; Nottingham Panthers Basingstoke Bison
- Playing career: 2003–present

Shaun Thompson (born 13 July 1987) is a British ice hockey player who currently plays for the Braehead Clan of the Elite Ice Hockey League.

Thompson was born in Slough. Thompson joined Basingstoke Bison in 2003. In 2005 and 2006, he was sent to the Bracknell Bees in the English Premier Ice Hockey League in aid of his development. In 2007, he briefly played for the Nottingham Panthers before returning to Bracknell and once again Basingstoke for the 2008-09 Elite League season.
