= Len Hachborn =

Canadian ice hockey player

- Born: September 4, 1961 (age 64) Brantford, Ontario, Canada
- Height: 5 ft 10 in (178 cm)
- Weight: 180 lb (82 kg; 12 st 12 lb)
- Position: Centre
- Shot: Left
- Played for: Philadelphia Flyers; Los Angeles Kings; HC Bolzano; Innsbrucker EV; Zürcher SC; Krefelder EV 1981
- NHL draft: 184th overall, 1981; Philadelphia Flyers
- Playing career: 1982–2001

Leonard Hachborn (born September 9, 1961) is a Canadian former professional ice hockey player. He played 102 games in the National Hockey League (NHL) with the Philadelphia Flyers and Los Angeles Kings from 1983 to 1986. Hachborn grew up playing hockey with his childhood friend Wayne Gretzky. As a youth, he played in the 1974 Quebec International Pee-Wee Hockey Tournament with a minor ice hockey team from Brantford.

== Career statistics ==
=== Regular season and playoffs ===
			Regular season					Playoffs
Season	Team	League	GP	G	A	Pts	PIM	GP	G	A	Pts	PIM
1979–80	Hamilton A's	OPJAHL	43	25	20	45	42	—	—	—	—	—
1979–80	Brantford Alexanders	OMJHL	3	1	0	1	0	—	—	—	—	—
1980–81	Brantford Alexanders	OHL	66	34	52	86	94	6	1	5	6	15
1981–82	Brantford Alexanders	OHL	55	43	50	93	141	11	15	9	24	13
1982–83	Maine Mariners	AHL	75	28	55	83	32	17	2	7	9	2
1983–84	Philadelphia Flyers	NHL	38	11	21	32	4	3	0	0	0	7
1983–84	Springfield Indians	AHL	28	28	42	60	15	—	—	—	—	—
1984–85	Philadelphia Flyers	NHL	40	5	17	22	23	4	0	3	3	0
1984–85	Hershey Bears	AHL	14	6	7	13	14	—	—	—	—	—
1985–86	Los Angeles Kings	NHL	24	4	1	5	2	—	—	—	—	—
1985–86	Hershey Bears	AHL	23	12	22	34	34	—	—	—	—	—
1985–86	New Haven Nighthawks	AHL	12	5	8	13	21	3	0	1	1	26
1986–87	HC Bolzano	ITA	35	36	67	103	47	—	—	—	—	—
1986–87	Hershey Bears	AHL	17	4	10	14	2	5	0	2	2	2
1987–88	Innsbrucker EV	AUT	34	32	38	70	14	—	—	—	—	—
1987–88	Maine Mariners	AHL	29	16	17	33	16	10	5	7	12	21
1988–89	Rogle BK	SWE-2	32	21	21	42	56	3	2	2	4	26
1989–90	New Haven Nighthawks	AHL	32	13	27	40	15	—	—	—	—	—
1989–90	Zürcher SC	NLA	13	6	3	9	33	—	—	—	—	—
1990–91	Binghamton Rangers	AHL	50	9	27	36	8	4	0	1	1	6
1991–92	San Diego Gulls	IHL	70	34	73	107	124	4	0	2	2	17
1992–93	Ayr Raiders	A-Cup	8	16	20	36	28	—	—	—	—	—
1992–93	San Diego Gulls	IHL	59	23	36	59	49	10	2	2	4	2
1993–94	Krefelder EV 1981	GER	2	1	1	2	0	3	2	0	2	2
1994–95	Houston Aeros	IHL	53	12	30	42	10	—	—	—	—	—
1994–95	Springfield Falcons	AHL	5	2	4	6	2	—	—	—	—	—
1994–95	Detroit Vipers	IHL	—	—	—	—	—	1	0	1	1	0
1995–96	Heilbronner EC	GER-2	28	15	40	55	58	7	5	4	9	7
1996–97	Grand Rapids Griffins	IHL	19	2	2	4	6	—	—	—	—	—
1997–98	San Diego Gulls	WCHL	45	27	63	90	62	12	7	7	14	10
1998–99	San Diego Gulls	WCHL	49	23	64	87	36	12	4	12	16	4
1999–00	Phoenix Mustangs	WCHL	12	4	14	18	2	12	3	10	13	8
2000–01	Phoenix Mustangs	WCHL	21	10	17	27	4	—	—	—	—	—
NHL totals			102	20	39	59	29	7	0	3	3	7
