= Craig Martin (ice hockey) =

Canadian ice hockey player

- Born: January 21, 1971 (age 55) Amherst, Nova Scotia, Canada
- Height: 6 ft 2 in (188 cm)
- Weight: 215 lb (98 kg; 15 st 5 lb)
- Position: Right wing
- Shot: Right
- Played for: Winnipeg Jets; Florida Panthers; Berlin Capitals
- NHL draft: 98th overall, 1990; Winnipeg Jets
- Playing career: 1991–2009

Craig Martin (born January 21, 1971) is a Canadian former professional ice hockey right winger who played two seasons in the National Hockey League for the Winnipeg Jets and Florida Panthers.

== Career ==
Martin was drafted 98th overall by the Jets in the 1990 NHL entry draft. He played 20 regular season games for the Jets during the 1994–95 NHL season, scoring one assist with 19 penalty minutes. Martin played one more game for the Florida Panthers in the 1996–97 NHL season, collecting five penalty minutes.

In July 2018, Martin was inducted into the Multi-Ethnic Sports Hall of Fame along with two other Black former professional players from Amherst. Bill Riley and Mark McFarlane.

== Career statistics ==
			Regular season					Playoffs
Season	Team	League	GP	G	A	Pts	PIM	GP	G	A	Pts	PIM
1986–87	Pictou County Weeks Construction Midgets	NSMAAAL	38	19	15	34	90	—	—	—	—	—
1987–88	Hull Olympiques	QMJHL	66	5	5	10	137	19	0	0	0	28
1988–89	Hull Olympiques	QMJHL	70	14	29	43	260	9	0	1	1	10
1989–90	Hull Olympiques	QMJHL	66	14	31	45	299	11	2	1	3	65
1990–91	Hull Olympiques	QMJHL	19	5	6	11	87	—	—	—	—	—
1990–91	Saint-Hyacinthe Laser	QMJHL	35	8	10	18	170	4	0	3	3	39
1991–92	Moncton Hawks	AHL	11	1	1	2	70	—	—	—	—	—
1991–92	Fort Wayne Komets	IHL	24	0	0	0	115	—	—	—	—	—
1992–93	Moncton Hawks	AHL	64	5	13	18	198	5	0	1	1	22
1993–94	Adirondack Red Wings	AHL	76	15	24	39	297	12	2	2	4	63
1994–95	Winnipeg Jets	NHL	20	0	1	1	19	—	—	—	—	—
1994–95	Springfield Falcons	AHL	6	0	1	1	21	—	—	—	—	—
1995–96	Springfield Falcons	AHL	48	6	5	11	245	8	0	1	1	34
1996–97	Florida Panthers	NHL	1	0	0	0	5	—	—	—	—	—
1996–97	Carolina Monarchs	AHL	44	1	2	3	239	—	—	—	—	—
1996–97	San Antonio Dragons	IHL	15	3	3	6	99	6	0	1	1	25
1997–98	San Antonio Dragons	IHL	6	1	1	2	21	—	—	—	—	—
1997–98	Quebec Rafales	IHL	24	1	3	4	115	—	—	—	—	—
1997–98	Manitoba Moose	IHL	30	4	3	7	202	1	0	0	0	10
1998–99	Berlin Capitals	DEL	46	0	1	1	183	—	—	—	—	—
1999–00	Adirondack IceHawks	UHL	7	0	1	1	26	—	—	—	—	—
1999–00	Phoenix Mustangs	WCHL	50	12	10	22	286	10	4	2	6	28
2000–01	Phoenix Mustangs	WCHL	20	1	5	6	116	—	—	—	—	—
2000–01	Bakersfield Condors	WCHL	44	7	12	19	287	3	0	0	0	28
2001–02	Laval Chiefs	QSPHL	34	5	6	11	216	18	4	5	9	96
2002–03	Laval Chiefs	QSPHL	29	2	9	11	213	18	2	1	3	115
2003–04	Laval Chiefs	QSMHL	24	3	7	10	206	—	—	—	—	—
2004–05	Laval Chiefs	LNAH	38	5	10	15	224	—	—	—	—	—
2005–06	Laval Chiefs	LNAH	11	0	0	0	64	—	—	—	—	—
2005–06	Saint-Georges CRS Express	LNAH	6	0	4	4	34	2	0	1	1	35
2007–08	Rivière-du-Loup CIMT	QSCHL	17	1	0	1	114	5	0	0	0	55
2008–09	Chandler Gaillard	LHSBEQ	6	1	1	2	84	3	0	0	0	10
NHL totals			21	0	1	1	24	—	—	—	—	—
