= Ralph Barahona =

American ice hockey player (born 1965)

- Born: November 16, 1965 (age 60) Long Beach, California, U.S.
- Height: 5 ft 10 in (178 cm)
- Weight: 185 lb (84 kg; 13 st 3 lb)
- Position: Center
- Shot: Left
- Played for: Boston Bruins
- NHL draft: Undrafted
- Playing career: 1990–2001

Ralph Joseph Barahona (born November 16, 1965) is an American former professional ice hockey center who played six games in the National Hockey League for the Boston Bruins. He scored two goals and two assists for four points in his brief NHL career. Prior to the NHL, Barahona played at the University of Wisconsin Stevens Point where he won two National Championships in 1989 and 1990.

Both of Barahona's two NHL goals came in the same game. On February 3, 1991, Barahona scored Boston's final two goals in his team's 6-3 victory over the Pittsburgh Penguins at Boston Garden.

== Career statistics ==
=== Regular season and playoffs ===
			Regular season					Playoffs
Season	Team	League	GP	G	A	Pts	PIM	GP	G	A	Pts	PIM
1983–84	Austin Mavericks	USHL	48	35	40	75	59	—	—	—	—	—
1985–86	Rochester Mustangs	USHL	40	22	36	58	16	—	—	—	—	—
1986–87	University of Wisconsin–Stevens Point	NCHA	29	21	21	42	8	—	—	—	—	—
1987–88	University of Wisconsin–Stevens Point	NCHA	31	25	26	51	16	—	—	—	—	—
1988–89	University of Wisconsin–Stevens Point	NCHA	41	33	47	80	40	—	—	—	—	—
1989–90	University of Wisconsin–Stevens Point	NCHA	35	17	26	43	20	—	—	—	—	—
1990–91	Boston Bruins	NHL	3	2	1	3	0	—	—	—	—	—
1990–91	Maine Mariners	AHL	72	24	33	57	14	2	1	1	2	0
1991–92	Boston Bruins	NHL	3	0	1	1	0	—	—	—	—	—
1991–92	Maine Mariners	AHL	74	27	32	59	39	—	—	—	—	—
1992–93	Fort Wayne Komets	IHL	7	0	2	2	2	—	—	—	—	—
1992–93	Utica Devils	AHL	2	0	0	0	0	—	—	—	—	—
1992–93	Cincinnati Cyclones	IHL	30	8	6	14	4	—	—	—	—	—
1993–94	Hampton Roads Admirals	ECHL	27	13	20	33	12	7	3	5	8	4
1993–94	Raleigh Icecaps	ECHL	36	14	21	35	12	—	—	—	—	—
1995–96	San Diego Gulls	WCHL	56	31	56	87	36	9	2	7	9	6
1998–99	Phoenix Mustangs	WCHL	8	2	2	4	0	3	0	2	2	0
1999–00	Bakersfield Condors	WCHL	43	13	17	30	18	3	0	1	1	4
2000–01	Long Beach Ice Dogs	WCHL	61	22	23	45	37	8	3	3	6	4
NHL totals			6	2	2	4	0	—	—	—	—	—
