= Sean Whyte (ice hockey) =

Canadian ice hockey player

- Born: May 4, 1970 (age 54); Sudbury, Ontario, Canada
- Height: 6 ft 0 in (183 cm)
- Weight: 198 lb (90 kg; 14 st 2 lb)
- Position: Right wing
- Shot: Right
- Played for: Los Angeles Kings
- NHL draft: 165th overall, 1989; Los Angeles Kings
- Playing career: 1990–2001

Sean Whyte (born May 4, 1970) is a Canadian former professional ice hockey player who briefly played for the Los Angeles Kings of the National Hockey League (NHL).

== Career statistics ==
			Regular season					Playoffs
Season	Team	League	GP	G	A	Pts	PIM	GP	G	A	Pts	PIM
1985–86	Gloucester Rangers	CJHL	34	23	15	38	45	—	—	—	—	—
1986–87	Guelph B's	MWJHL	4	0	7	7	6	—	—	—	—	—
1986–87	Guelph Platers	OHL	41	1	3	4	13	—	—	—	—	—
1987–88	Guelph Platers	OHL	62	7	22	28	71	—	—	—	—	—
1988–89	Guelph Platers	OHL	53	20	44	64	57	—	—	—	—	—
1989–90	Owen Sound Platers	OHL	54	23	30	53	90	3	0	1	1	10
1990–91	Phoenix Roadrunners	IHL	60	18	17	35	61	4	1	0	1	2
1991–92	Los Angeles Kings	NHL	3	0	0	0	0	—	—	—	—	—
1991–92	Phoenix Roadrunners	IHL	72	24	30	54	113	—	—	—	—	—
1992–93	Los Angeles Kings	NHL	18	0	2	2	12	—	—	—	—	—
1992–93	Phoenix Roadrunners	IHL	51	11	35	46	65	—	—	—	—	—
1993–94	Tulsa Oilers	CHL	50	42	29	71	93	—	—	—	—	—
1993–94	Cornwall Aces	AHL	18	6	9	15	16	9	1	2	3	2
1994–95	Worcester IceCats	AHL	59	13	8	21	76	—	—	—	—	—
1995–96	Fort Worth Fire	CHL	51	15	37	52	94	—	—	—	—	—
1995–96	Phoenix Roadrunners	IHL	11	0	2	2	4	—	—	—	—	—
1996–97	El Paso Buzzards	WPHL	60	21	39	60	105	11	2	14	16	36
1997–98	Phoenix Mustangs	WCHL	53	19	23	42	93	9	4	10	14	10
1998–99	Phoenix Mustangs	WCHL	65	16	34	50	80	3	2	0	2	4
1999–00	Phoenix Mustangs	WCHL	60	28	28	56	50	12	4	5	9	32
2000–01	Phoenix Mustangs	WCHL	34	9	14	23	80	—	—	—	—	—
NHL totals			21	0	2	2	12	—	—	—	—	—
