= Radoslav Hecl =

Slovak ice hockey player

- Born: October 11, 1974 (age 52) Partizánske, Czechoslovakia
- Height: 6 ft 1 in (185 cm)
- Weight: 196 lb (89 kg; 14 st 0 lb)
- Position: Defence
- Shot: Left
- Played for: SG Pontebba; Manchester Phoenix; Slovan Bratislava; Buffalo Sabres; HC Nitra; Dukla Trenčín
- National team: Slovakia
- NHL draft: 208th overall, 2002; Buffalo Sabres
- Playing career: 1992–2008

Radoslav Hecl (born October 11, 1974) is a Slovak former ice hockey defenceman. He played 14 games in the National Hockey League with the Buffalo Sabres during the 2002–03 season, though the rest of his career, which lasted from 1992 to 2008, was mainly spent in the Slovak Extraliga. Internationally Hecl played for the Slovak national team at three World Championships, winning gold in 2002.

== Playing career ==
Medal record

Representing Slovakia
Gold medal – first place	2002 Sweden	

Hecl started playing ice hockey at the age of four in Topoľčany, together with Miroslav Šatan. After several years in the Slovak Extraliga, Hecl was drafted in the seventh round, 208th overall, by the Buffalo Sabres in the 2002 NHL entry draft. Hecl appeared in fourteen National Hockey League games in the 2002–03 season, recording no points, and spent the rest of the season with the Sabres' American Hockey League affiliate, the Rochester Americans. Hecl returned to his native Slovakia and played two seasons in the Slovak Extraliga with HC Slovan Bratislava before joining the EIHL with the Manchester Phoenix in the 2006–07 season. He moved on to Sport Ghiaccio Pontebba in Serie A in the 2007–08 season before retiring. He won the Slovak championship five times, in 1994, 1998, 2000, 2002 and 2005.

Hecl played 52 games for the Slovak national team and scored one goal. At the 2002 IIHF World Championship he joined the team for the quarter-finals and won the gold medal.

== Post-playing career ==
Hecl retired in 2008 and studied management. He later worked as a television commentator in Slovakia and was the manager of VTJ Topoľčany from 2009 to 2012. In 2017, the Slovak Ice Hockey Federation appointed him coach of its regional under-15 teams.

== Career statistics ==
=== Regular season and playoffs ===
			Regular season					Playoffs
Season	Team	League	GP	G	A	Pts	PIM	GP	G	A	Pts	PIM
1992–93	ASVŠ Dukla Trenčín	CSSR	12	0	0	0	—	—	—	—	—	—
1993–94	Dukla Trenčín	SVK	33	2	11	13	—	—	—	—	—	—
1994–95	Dukla Trenčín	SVK	13	1	0	1	8	5	1	0	1	4
1995–96	AC/HC Nitra	SVK	39	6	5	11	119	—	—	—	—	—
1996–97	HC Slovan Bratislava	SVK	36	1	5	6	41	—	—	—	—	—
1997–98	HC Slovan Bratislava	SVK	45	8	11	19	47	—	—	—	—	—
1997–98	Iskra Zlatý Bažant Banská Bystrica	SVK-2	5	1	0	1	16	—	—	—	—	—
1998–99	HC Slovan Bratislava	SVK	50	7	14	21	92	—	—	—	—	—
1999–2000	HC Slovan Bratislava	SVK	41	2	7	9	61	8	2	1	3	2
2000–01	HC Slovan Bratislava	SVK	25	2	5	7	6	6	1	1	2	18
2001–02	HC Slovan Bratislava	SVK	50	7	13	20	22	17	2	5	7	10
2002–03	Rochester Americans	AHL	58	6	14	20	41	3	0	0	0	0
2002–03	Buffalo Sabres	NHL	14	0	0	0	2	—	—	—	—	—
2003–04	HC Slovan Bratislava	SVK	35	1	6	7	84	—	—	—	—	—
2004–05	HC Slovan Bratislava	SVK	44	4	7	11	34	—	—	—	—	—
2005–06	HC Slovan Bratislava	SVK	31	1	3	4	18	—	—	—	—	—
2006–07	Manchester Phoenix	EIHL	50	7	15	22	91	2	0	0	0	4
2007–08	SG Pontebba	ITA	28	3	8	11	30	12	0	4	4	18
SVK totals			442	42	87	129	532	36	6	7	13	34
NHL totals			14	0	0	0	2	—	—	—	—	—

=== International ===
Year	Team	Event	GP	G	A	Pts	PIM
1992	Czechoslovakia	EJC	4	1	1	2	0
1994	Slovakia	WJC C	4	1	4	5	2
1994	Slovakia	WC C	6	0	1	1	0
1999	Slovakia	WC	6	0	0	0	2
2002	Slovakia	WC	3	0	0	0	0
Junior totals			8	2	5	7	2
Senior totals			15	0	1	1	2
