= Phoenix Mustangs =

Professional minor league ice hockey team

- City: Phoenix, Arizona
- League: WCHL
- Founded: 1997
- Operated: 1997–2001
- Home arena: Arizona Veterans Memorial Coliseum
- Colors: Red, yellow, blue

Franchise history
- 1997–2001: Phoenix Mustangs

Championships
- Regular season titles: 0
- Division titles: 0
- Taylor Cups: 1 (1999–00)

The Phoenix Mustangs were a professional minor league ice hockey team in the West Coast Hockey League (WCHL). The Mustangs played at the Arizona Veterans Memorial Coliseum on the grounds of the Arizona State Fair, from the 1997–98 season through the 2000–01 season. The Mustangs came into existence after the demise of the International Hockey League's Phoenix Roadrunners who lost funding from a local Indian community and ceased operations after the 1996–97 season. Their arrival rekindled a decades long rivalry between Phoenix and San Diego based teams in several minor leagues.

The Mustangs were quite successful on the ice their first three seasons, including winning the WCHL's Taylor Cup Championship in 2000 with a four-game sweep of the Tacoma Sabercats, with an exciting sudden-death overtime victory at the Coliseum in game four. The Mustangs were not so blessed the following season, finishing last in their final season in 2000–01. The Mustangs were unable to secure a new lease with the Coliseum for the 2001–02 season and were forced to cease operations.

== Season-by-season record ==
Note: GP = Games played, W = Wins, L = Losses, OTL = Overtime losses, SOL = Shootout losses, Pts = Points, GF = Goals for, GA = Goals against, PIM = Penalties in minutes
Final records.

Season	GP	W	L	SOL	Pts	GF	GA	PIM	Finish	Coach	Playoffs
1997–98	64	36	25	3	75	267	235	1656	2nd, South	Brad McCaughey	Lost in round 2, 0-4 (San Diego)
1998–99	71	32	33	6	70	260	284	1932	3rd, South	Brad McCaughey	Lost in round 1, 1-2 (Fresno)
1999–00	72	31	35	6	68	264	284	2085	3rd, South	Marty Raymond	Won Taylor Cup, 4-0 (Tacoma)
2000–01	72	21	48	3	45	213	333	2174	5th, South	Marty Raymond	Missed playoffs

== All-Time Roster ==
#	Player	Pos	Height	Weight (lbs.)	Birthdate	Birthplace
16	Tobias Ablad	D	5'11"	207	February 4, 1971	Stockholm, Sweden
32	Steve Adams	D	6'1"	225	April 11, 1975	Edmonton, Alberta
12	Alex Alepin	D	5'11"	200	September 18, 1975	Montreal, Quebec
91	Jamie Allan	RW	6'0"	190	March 18, 1970	Ottawa, Ontario
	Darcy Anderson	RW	6'0"	194	July 23, 1974	North Bay, Ontario
8	John Badduke	RW	6'2"	212	June 21, 1972	Calgary, Alberta
	Darren Banks	LW	6'2"	228	March 19, 1966	Toronto, Ontario
16/17	Ralph Barahona	C	5'10"	185	November 16, 1965	Lakewood, California
11	Hugo Belanger	LW	6'0"	190	May 28, 1970	Saint-Hubert, Quebec
	Éric Bellerose	LW	6'1"	200	February 7, 1972	Montreal, Quebec
	Jonas Bergdahl	D	6'0"	218	February 5, 1976	Sweden
	David Bilik	D	6'0"	200	December 13, 1979	Tábor, Czechoslovakia
35	Gene Bono	G	6'2"	196	October 15, 1974	Sandwich, Massachusetts
28	E.J. Bradley	C	5'11"	185	January 1, 1975	New Hyde Park, New York
55	Kevin Brown	RW	6'1"	212	May 11, 1974	Birmingham, England
30	Mike Buzak	G	6'3"	210	February 10, 1973	Edson, Alberta
	Steve Caley	C	5'9"	175	August 13, 1978	Toronto, Ontario
	Denis Chalifoux	C	5'8"	165	February 21, 1971	Laval, Quebec
10	Clint Collins	RW	6'0"	192	August 2, 1974	Vancouver, British Columbia
2	Mark Costea	D	5'10"	200	January 26, 1974	Welland, Ontario
39	Patrick Couture	G	5'11"	180	May 28, 1978	Quebec City, Quebec
15/16	Michel Couvrette	C	5'10	193	November 11, 1965	Verdun, France
7	Mike DeAngelis	D	5'11"	190	January 27, 1966	Kamloops, British Columbia
	Frank DeFrenza	RW	6'3"	198	September 26, 1974	Burnaby, British Columbia
24	Dave Doucet	D	5'10"	200	May 29, 1973	Quebec City, Quebec
10	Jon Dunmar	D	6'1"	220	April 24, 1973	Buenos Aires, Argentina
	Miroslav Dvorak	D	5'10"	195	April 4, 1975	České Budějovice, Czechoslovakia
22	Kevin Epp	D	6'0"	189	August 27, 1974	Cranbrook, British Columbia
28	Kristoffer Eriksson	D	5'11"	194	June 4, 1975	Stockholm, Sweden
10	Robert Fail	D	6'0"	190	September 16, 1978	Martin, Czechoslovakia
	Sam Fields	D	6'3"	215	August 31, 1976	Chicago, Illinois
	Dereck Gosselin	D	6'1"	175	February 20, 1975	Asbestos, Quebec
30	David Goverde	G	6'1"	200	April 9, 1970	Toronto, Ontario
3	Jessy Grenier	LW	6'2"	215	July 21, 1976	Chandler, Quebec
	Jason Gudmundson	RW	5'9"	170	April 9, 1974	Arborg, Manitoba
	Ben Gustavson	LW	5'11"	190	April 23, 1978	Provo, Utah
10	Len Hachborn	C	5'10"	180	September 4, 1961	Brantford, Ontario
12	David Haynes	RW	6'1"	210	August 20, 1975	Kitchener, Ontario
55	Steve Herniman	D	6'4"	215	June 9, 1968	Windsor, Ontario
	Rod Hinks	C	5'11"	185	April 11, 1973	Toronto, Ontario
17	Juri Holik	LW	6'0"	179	September 13, 1976	Jihlava, Czechoslovakia
18	Tony Iob	LW	5'11"	202	January 2, 1971	Renfrew, Ontario
28	Denis Ivanov	RW	6'4"	208	April 21, 1978	Elektrostal, USSR
	Jason Johnson	D	5'11"	196	September 4, 1975	Unionville, Ontario
20	Kevin Kerr	RW	6'0"	190	September 18, 1967	North Bay, Ontario
15	John Kosobud	LW	6'0"	205	August 26, 1972	Fargo, North Dakota
24	Arturs Kupaks	D	6'0"	190	July 14, 1973	Riga, Latvia
	Brian Lachance	D	6'1"	169	December 31, 1979	Vanier, Quebec
25	Martin Lacroix	RW	5'11"	180	January 4, 1970	Montreal, Quebec
22/32	Corey Laniuk	D	6'2"	220	January 30, 1977	Vancouver, British Columbia
	Daniel Larin	RW	5'11"	205	November 20, 1967	Laval, Quebec
7	Don Lester	D	5'11"	180	April 29, 1970	Forest, Ontario
	Tim Lozinik	D	6'1"	200	January 28, 1977	St. Albert, Alberta
	Patrick Lundback	D	6'2"	205	March 12, 1968	Karlstad, Sweden
23	Dave Lylyk	LW	6'2"	190	December 22, 1975	Guelph, Ontario
	Rick MacDonald	D	5'11"	200	January 24, 1976	Evergreen Park, Illinois
4	Jason MacIntyre	D	5'10"	190	July 14, 1972	Halifax, Nova Scotia
	Kevin Mackie	D	6'2"	200	February 9, 1979	Victoria, British Columbia
17	Craig Martin	RW	6'2"	215	January 21, 1971	Amherst, Nova Scotia
19	Michel Massie	LW	6'0"	192	July 2, 1977	Montreal, Quebec
52	Doug McCarthy	C	5'10"	180	November 4, 1962	Edmonton, Alberta
	Jim McGroarty	C	5'8"	180	April 24, 1972	Toronto, Ontario
10	Rusty McKie	RW	6'1"	190	October 5, 1974	Toledo, Ohio
18	Bobby McKillop	RW	5'11"	185	March 19, 1970	Kitchener, Ontario
5	Darren Meek	D	5'10"	190	September 25, 1971	Williams Lake, British Columbia
21	Tom Menicci	D	6'0"	205	July 23, 1971	Westford, Massachusetts
22	Curtis Menzul	D	6'4"	220	April 6, 1976	Winnipeg, Manitoba
32	Dan Milicevic	D	6'2"	215	March 7, 1968	Toronto, Ontario
26	Savo Mitrovic	C	5'11"	200	February 4, 1969	Belgrade, Yugoslavia
19	Claude Morin	C	5'10"	172	September 29, 1971	Sainte-Foy, Quebec
	Zbynek Neckar	D	6'2"	210	September 22, 1978	Písek, Czechoslovakia
33	Carlin Nordstrom	LW	6'2"	213	February 20, 1973	Saskatoon, Saskatchewan
20	Matt Oliver	LW	6'1"	210	March 16, 1974	Euclid, Ohio
6	Darryl Olsen	D	6'0"	180	October 7, 1966	Calgary, Alberta
35	Eric Patry	G	6'3"	185	March 5, 1977	Gatineau, Quebec
17	Richard Peacock	RW	5'10"	215	June 15, 1978	Salmon Arm, British Columbia
26	Eric Perricone	LW	5'11"	186	November 21, 1978	St. Jean, Quebec
2	Jean-Francois Picard	D	6'0"	205	April 12, 1979	Montreal, Quebec
3	David Piirto	D	6'3"	230	August 26, 1971	Richmond Hill, Ontario
	Simon Poirer	D	6'1"	215	November 20, 1979	Montreal, Quebec
	Ryan Poulton	D	5'11"	180	January 4, 1976	Toronto, Ontario
	Gert Prohaska	G	6'2"	200	March 31, 1976	Klagenfurt, Austria
7	Bobby Rapoza	D	6'2"	225	September 29, 1974	Fall River, Massachusetts
23	Iannique Renaud	RW	6'3"	215	September 19, 1975	Winnipeg, Manitoba
17	Serge Roberge	RW	6'1"	195	March 31, 1965	Quebec City, Quebec
18	Patrice Robitaille	RW	6'0"	190	December 4, 1970	Sainte-Catherine, Quebec
55	Jacque Rodrigue	D	6'0"	190	May 7, 1971	Nashua, New Hampshire
8	Jason Rose	D	6'0"	180	January 12, 1975	Martensville, Saskatchewan
26	Peter Rozic	RW	6'0"	202	February 17, 1974	Jesenice, Slovenia
44	Ken Ruddick	D	6'1"	205	August 15, 1972	Hamilton, Ontario
	Jason Rushton	RW	5'11"	205	December 12, 1974	Victoria, British Columbia
27	Thierry Ryckman	LW	6'0"	190	April 21, 1975	Rimouski, Quebec
33	Steve Sabo	D	6'1"	195	January 7, 1973	Thief River Falls, Minnesota
6	Warren Sachs	C	5'8"	180	February 18, 1977	Saskatoon, Saskatchewan
23	Rusty Saglo	LW	6'1"	190	May 8, 1978	Kyiv, USSR
	Francois Sasseville	C	5'11"	195	February 7, 1977	Saint-Bruno-de-Montarville, Quebec
	Ryan Schmidt	D	6'2"	205	May 23, 1973	Des Moines, Iowa
	Daniel Schwarz	D	6'2"	202	February 27, 1978	Augsburg, Germany
16/2/34	Daniel Shank	RW	5'11"	200	May 12, 1967	Montreal, Quebec
19	Jeff Shevalier	LW	5'11"	180	March 14, 1974	Erin, Ontario
55	Jonathon Shockey	D	6'2"	190	June 8, 1976	Lethbridge, Alberta
	Eric Silverman	RW	6'3"	190	May 23, 1975	West Nyack, New York
35	Eddy Skazyk	G	5'11"	170	September 4, 1974	Lockport, Manitoba
16	Mark Spence	LW	6'1"	190	April 21, 1975	Montreal, Quebec
16	Kevin St. Jacques	C	5'11	190	February 25, 1971	Edmonton, Alberta
32	Mario Therrien	LW	6'3"	225	May 18, 1972	Sainte-Anne-des-Plaines, Quebec
33	Mike Thomas	G	5'10"	200	April 6, 1971	Thompson, Manitoba
77	Mike Tobin	D	5'11"	217	April 25, 1971	Jarvis, Ontario
20	Lorne Toews	LW	6'0"	200	June 17, 1973	Winnipeg, Manitoba
	Janis Tomans	RW	6'1"	200	February 5, 1975	Riga, Latvia
	Eric Tuott	RW	5'7"	165	July 22, 1975	Anchorage, Alaska
5	Darren Veitch	D	6'0"	200	April 24, 1960	Saskatoon, Saskatchewan
	Joe Wassilyn	C	5'11"	203	January 20, 1974	Toronto, Ontario
9	Sean Whyte	D	6'0"	198	May 4, 1970	Sudbury, Ontario
7	Steve Woodburn	D	6'1"	194	October 24, 1963	Montreal, Quebec
23	Jeremy Yablonski	RW	5'11"	239	March 21, 1980	Meadow Lake, Saskatchewan
19	C.J. Yoder	C	6'2"	190	July 17, 1975	Hershey, Pennsylvania
