= Richard Bordowski =

Czech ice hockey player

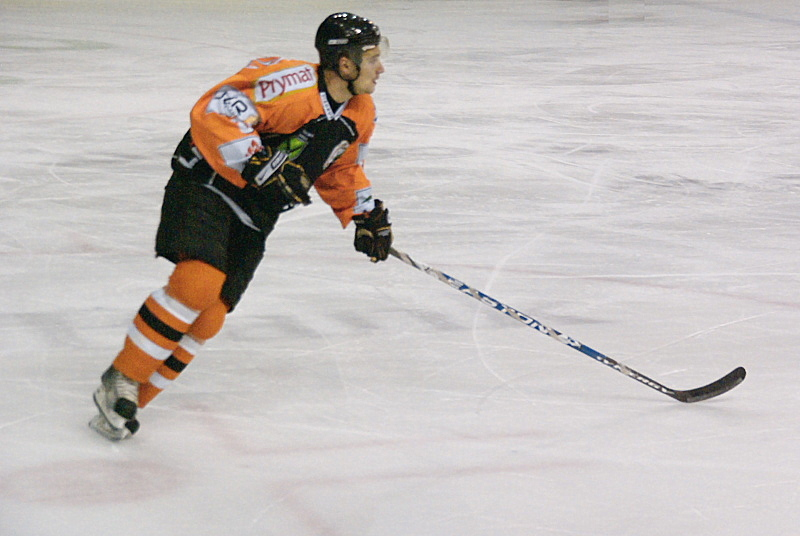
- Born: June 20, 1982 (age 42); Třinec, Czechoslovakia
- Height: 183 cm (6 ft 0 in)
- Weight: 98 kg (216 lb; 15 st 6 lb)
- Position: Centre
- Shoots: Right
- NIHL team: Basingstoke Bison
- Playing career: 2000–present

Richard Bordowski (born 20 June 1982) is a Czech ice hockey centre who is currently playing for the Basingstoke Bison of the National Ice Hockey League. Before this, he played in the Czech Extraliga, mainly for HC Oceláři Třinec. and sometimes on loan to HC Znojemsti Orli. After the 2009–10 Czech Extraliga season, and playing mostly in second and third-tier Czech teams since the 2005–06 season, Bordowski left the Czech leagues and played in Poland. He played for JKH GKS Jastrzębie from the 2011–2016 seasons, and then for Polonia Bytom for the 2017 and half of the 2018 season before returning to JKH GKS Jastrzebie.
