= Marcus Kristoffersson =

Swedish ice hockey player (born 1979)

- Born: January 22, 1979 (age 47) Östersund, Sweden
- Height: 6 ft 2 in (188 cm)
- Weight: 205 lb (93 kg; 14 st 9 lb)
- Position: Right wing
- Shoots: Left
- Slovak Extraliga team Former teams: HC ’05 Banská Bystrica; HV71; Blues; Ässät; Djurgårdens IF; Utah Grizzlies; Skellefteå AIK; Malmö Redhawks; SG Cortina; Örebro HK; Manchester Phoenix
- NHL draft: 105th overall, 1997; Dallas Stars
- Playing career: 1995–present

Marcus Kristoffersson (born January 22, 1979) is a Swedish professional ice hockey right winger currently playing for HC ’05 Banská Bystrica in the Slovak Extraliga. He played in the Elitserien for HV71, Djurgårdens IF and Skellefteå AIK and has also played in the Finnish SM-liiga for Blues and Ässät, the American Hockey League for the Utah Grizzlies, the Italian Serie A for SG Cortina and the English Premier Ice Hockey League for the Manchester Phoenix. He was drafted 105th overall in the 1997 NHL entry draft by the Dallas Stars.

== Career Statistics ==
			Regular season					Playoffs
Season	Team	League	GP	G	A	Pts	PIM	GP	G	A	Pts	PIM
1993–94	Brunflo IK	Hockeytvåan	6	1	1	2	0	—	—	—	—	—
1994–95	Brunflo IK	Hockeytvåan	19	2	1	3	8	—	—	—	—	—
1995–96	Mora IK J20	J20 SuperElit	16	2	2	4	28	—	—	—	—	—
1995–96	Mora IK	Hockeyettan	26	1	0	1	20	—	—	—	—	—
1996–97	Mora IK J20	J20 SuperElit	9	4	3	7	0	—	—	—	—	—
1996–97	Mora IK	Hockeyettan	23	1	5	6	26	—	—	—	—	—
1997–98	Mora IK	Hockeyettan	28	8	6	14	42	—	—	—	—	—
1998–99	HV71 J20	J20 SuperElit	3	0	1	1	27	—	—	—	—	—
1998–99	HV71	SHL	34	0	1	1	65	—	—	—	—	—
1999–00	HV71 J20	J20 SuperElit	7	5	9	14	41	—	—	—	—	—
1999–00	HV71	SHL	10	0	0	0	0	—	—	—	—	—
1999–00	Espoo Blues	SM-liiga	29	7	4	11	42	1	1	0	1	0
2000–01	HC Ässät Pori	SM-liiga	9	1	0	1	16	—	—	—	—	—
2000–01	Djurgårdens IF	SHL	29	4	2	6	72	12	2	2	4	45
2001–02	Utah Grizzles	AHL	50	6	10	16	42	—	—	—	—	—
2002–2003	Utah Grizzlies	AHL	62	10	9	19	58	2	1	0	1	2
2003–04	Djurgårdens IF	SHL	31	4	4	8	125	4	1	0	1	4
2004–05	Djurgårdens IF	SHL	20	2	2	4	42	11	1	1	2	28
2004–05	Skellefteå AIK	Allsvenskan	8	2	1	3	12	—	—	—	—	—
2005–06	Djurgårdens IF	SHL	35	2	4	6	94	—	—	—	—	—
2006–07	Skellefteå AIK	SHL	48	3	6	9	108	10	2	1	3	27
2007–08	Skellefteå AIK	SHL	51	2	7	9	60	5	0	1	1	0
2008–2009	Malmö Redhawks	Allsvenskan	9	1	0	1	2	—	—	—	—	—
2008–2009	Djurgårdens IF	SHL	2	0	0	0	6	—	—	—	—	—
2008–2009	SG CortinaÖrebro HK	Serie A	15	4	5	9	14	—	—	—	—	—
2009–2010	Örebro HK	Allsvenskan	23	7	5	12	82	—	—	—	—	—
2010–2011	Manchester Phoenix	EIHL	54	62	50	112	72	3	1	2	3	6
2011–2012	HC Banská Bystrica	SVK	55	12	18	30	69	5	0	4	4	2
2012–2013	Scorpions de Mulhouse	Ligue Magnus	26	16	14	30	34	—	—	—	—	—
2013–2014	Guildford Flames	EIHL	46	30	14	44	30	3	2	2	4	0
2014–2015	Guildford Flames	EIHL	43	22	28	50	22	2	2	1	3	4
2015–2016	Guildford Flames	EIHL	41	21	18	39	105	4	0	2	2	4
2016–2017	Guildford Flames	EIHL	11	2	6	8	58	—	—	—	—	—
SHL totals			260	17	26	43	572	42	6	5	11	104
AHL totals			112	16	19	35	100	2	1	0	1	2
EIHL totals			195	137	116	253	287	12	5	7	12	14
SM-liiga totals			38	8	4	12	58	1	1	0	1	0

=== International ===
Year	Team	Event	GP	G	A	Pts	PIM
1999	Sweden	WJC	6	3	4	7	33
