= Doug McCarthy (ice hockey) =

Canadian ice hockey player and coach

- Born: November 4, 1962 (age 63) Edmonton, Alberta, Canada
- Height: 5 ft 10 in (178 cm)
- Weight: 180 lb (82 kg; 12 st 12 lb)
- Position: Centre
- Shot: Left
- Played for: Billings Marlboros (CnHL); Carolina Thunderbirds (ACHL); HC Devils Milano (Alpenliga); Milton Keynes Kings (BHL); Cardiff Devils (EIHL); Phoenix Mustangs (WCHL); Lubbock Cotton Kings (WPHL); New Mexico Scorpions (WPHL)
- National team: Canada
- Playing career: 1985–2001

Doug McCarthy (born November 4, 1962) is a Canadian former professional ice hockey player and former inline hockey player and coach.

== Career ==
McCarthy was the captain of the Canada men's national inline hockey team, which won a silver medal at the 1997 IIHF InLine Hockey World Championship, and was the head coach of Canada's team which won gold at the 1998 IIHF InLine Hockey World Championship.
