= Éric Bellerose =

Canadian ice hockey player (born 1972)

- Born: February 7, 1972 (age 54) Montreal, Quebec, Canada
- Height: 6 ft 1 in (185 cm)
- Weight: 200 lb (91 kg; 14 st 4 lb)
- Position: Left wing
- Shot: Left
- Played for: Erding Jets; Erie Panthers; Fassa HC; Granby Prédateurs; Greensboro Monarchs; Joliette Mission; Landsberg EV; Milan Saima SG; Montreal Roadrunners; Phoenix Mustangs; Dragons de Rouen; Saint-Hyacinthe Cousin; Saint-Hyacinthe Laser; Trois-Rivières Caron & Guay; Trois-Rivières Draveurs; Verdun Dragons
- National team: Canada
- NHL draft: 147th overall, 1992; San Jose Sharks
- Playing career: 1993–2007

Éric Bellerose (born February 7, 1972) is a Canadian retired professional ice hockey player who played from 1993 until his retirement in 2007. Bellerose was drafted by the San Jose Sharks 147th overall in the 1992 NHL entry draft.
