= David Vychodil =

Czech professional ice hockey player (born 1980)

- Born: March 25, 1980 (age 46) Ostrava, Czechoslovakia
- Height: 6 ft 1 in (185 cm)
- Weight: 226 lb (103 kg; 16 st 2 lb)
- Position: Defence
- Shot: Left
- Played for: HC Vitkovice; HC Dukla Jihlava; Adirondack Frostbite; Greensboro Generals; Wheeling Nailers; Johnstown Chiefs; Gazovik Tyumen; Metallurg Serov; AZ Havirov; Manchester Phoenix; Coventry Blaze; Basingstoke Bison; Dunaújváros AC; Ferencvárosi TC; Arystan Temirtau
- Playing career: 2000–2016

David Vychodil (born March 25, 1980, in Ostrava, Czechoslovakia) is a Czech professional ice hockey player.

== Career ==
He began his notable career playing junior level and later on when he was spotted by senior head coach Vladimir Vůjtek also senior level in his native Czech Republic for HC Vitkovice. In spring 1999 Vychodil was selected for the U20 Czech National Team by Jaroslav Holík. In 2000 the WJC was held in Sweden and the Czech junior team won the gold medal for the first time in the history unfortunately Vychodil was 8th defenceman and didn't play any games. He spent his first professional year with Jaroslav Holík as a head coach in Dukla Jihava and won the league title, before moving to North America in the end of the year 2000. On arrival, he began playing junior-level hockey for the Sioux City Musketeers of the USHL, the highest level of junior hockey in the United States. In January 2001 Vychodil won the trophy for USHL Offensive Player of the week. During summer 2001, he went to the NHL draft, but none of the teams picked him.

Vychodil spent one season in Sioux City before progressing to ECHL standard with the Johnstown Chiefs. Vychodil would only play two games for the Chiefs before being moved mid-season to the Wheeling Nailers, another ECHL team. Vychodil settled well and played 38 games during the 2001/02 season. During summer 2002, the Wheeling Nailers head coach John Brophy recommend Vychodil to Pittsburgh Penguins organization and went for the training camps to Pittsburgh Penguins NHL and Wilkes-Barre Scranton Penguins AHL. After that he played just one game for the Wheeling Nailers before moving to Europe to play for HC Havirov Panthers of the Czech Extraliga during the 2002/03 season.

He began the 2003/04 season still in the Czech Republic, playing in the second tier of the Czech League for HC Frýdek-Místek. He played just four games before returning to North America with the Winston-Salem T-Birds of the SEHL, a team that existed for just one season before folding. Vychodil did not want to finish the season with the T-Birds though, and played for two more teams before the season ended - the Greensboro Generals and the Adirondack IceHawks.

Vychodil found form whilst playing for the Adirondack, and stayed for the following season. He proved to be an important player for the side, featuring in 75 games throughout the 2004/05 season. Despite his improved form, Vychodil changed the team in the off-season, moving to play for the first time in Russia for Metallurg Serov of the Vysshaya Liga. He remained to stay in Russia for the season, played 40 games. During the off-season, Vychodil was spotted by Manchester Phoenix player/coach Tony Hand and was added to the Phoenix blue-line.

He was a popular player amongst Phoenix fans, and became known for his accurate and powerful slapshot, which he used to grab 17 goals and total 37 points in 56 games for the Manchester club. His play led to the EIHL-winning Coventry Blaze signing him in the off-season as a replacement for the injured Rumun Ndur. Unfortunately, Vychodil was unable to produce his form for his new team and in November 2007 was released by Coventry head coach Paul Thompson following the signing of his former Phoenix teammate K. C. Timmons. Vychodil has since taken the opportunity to sign for his third club in the EIHL, signing for the Basingstoke Bison until the end of the 2007/08 season. During the off-season Vychodil chose to move to Russia, signing for Vysshaya Liga club Gazovik Tyumen.

After the season in Russia Vychodil decided to move for the 2009/10 season to Austria. His decision was influenced by the birth of his daughter. It was a successful year for both the family and also sports page he grabbed 23 points in 18 games and left a good impression in his team EHC Wattens.

During the off-season Vychodil signed in August 2010 a 3 years contract with the Hungarian team FTC Ferencvaros. He made his decision, because his grandmother was Hungarian nationality and he had the opportunity to get Hungarian citizenship and also play for the Hungarian Senior National Team. Vychodil proved his skills and high level of hockey he reached 26 points in 39 games and he belonged between the top defence in the league. In summer of 2011, the FTC Ferencvaros got into financial troubles and this situation forced Vychodil to leave.

Because of all these troubles he had in Hungary, he started to play his 2011/12 season late December for the Chiefs Leuven in Eredivisie. He played 8 games and grab 5 points.

For the 2012/13 season Vychodil returned to his hometown team HC Vitkovice Steel in Czech extraliga for the tryout. He split the season between Czech and Kazakhstan he played for the Arystan Temirtau.

In 2013 Vychodil moved to Belgium and spend 3 seasons 2013/2016. He played for the senior IHCL Leuven Chiefs Elite team which participates in BeNeLiga and Belgium Cup. He achieved 141 points in 79 games . He started his coaching career as well. As a head coach for the youth in IHCL Leuven Chiefs he won several league titles and tournaments with his youth teams in Belgium and abroad.

=== Retirement ===
After being diagnosed with a career-ending illness he was forced to retire in 2016. Since August 2017 he is head coach in Junior Ontario Reign Hockey Club (NAPHL), Junior San Diego Sabers (WSHL) in United States. He is also involved in coaching high school hockey (2017–2020), was an assistant coach at St. John Bosco Varsity after that 2021 he became the head coach of Carlsbad United Varsity. In the summer of 2023, he became the Director of Coaching for the Inland Empire United Wolverines, all teams competing in the Anaheim Ducks High School Hockey League (ADHSHL).

== Awards ==
Player Awards

- 2015-2016 BeNeLiga Most Penalized Player (Belgium)
- 2014-2015 League Winner Most Assists (Belgium)
- 2010-2011 Best Defenceman - MOL League (Hungary)
- 2005-2006 Most Penalty Minutes in the Vysshaya League (Russia)
- 2004-2005 IHL East Division Champion Adirondack Frostbite (U.S.A)
- 2000-2001 January USHL Offensive Player of the Week (U.S.A)
- All Time USHL Statistics By Nation (Czech Republic)
- Points 12th (3rd as defense), Goals 7th (1st as defense), PPG 10th (1st as defense)
- 1999-2000 League Championship 1 LIGA HC Dukla Jihlava (CZECH REPUBLIC)

Coaching Awards

- 2025 INLAND EMPIRE UNITED WOLVERINES (ADHSHL) - High School Varsity Division Champion Runner-up
- 2024 INLAND EMPIRE UNITED WOLVERINES (ADHSHL) - High School Junior Varsity Division Champion
- 2022 CARLSBAD UNITED (ADHSHL) - High School Varsity Division Champion Runner-up
- 2020 SAN DIEGO SABERS (WSHL) - Division Champion Runner-up
- 2020 St. JOHN BOSCO (ADHSHL) - Won the Varsity Division Title and Bronze at the High School National Championship
- 2017 St. JOHN BOSCO (ADHSHL) - Won the Varsity Division Title and Bronze at the High School National Championship
- 2016 BELGIAN LEAGUE CHAMPION RUNNER-UP U14
- 2016 INTERNATIONAL U13 TOURNAMENT (Franconville, France) – 1ST PLACE
- 2016 INTERNATIONAL U14 IJSHOCKEYTOERNOOI (Geleen, Netherlands) – 3RD PLACE
- 2015 NOVOTEL LEUVEN CHIEFS U12 INTERNATIONAL TOURNAMENT (Leuven, Belgium) – 2ND PLACE
- 2015 INTERNATIONAL U12 IJSHOCKEYTOERNOOI (Geleen, Netherlands) – 3RD PLACE
- 2015 BAUER TURKU-TURNAUS U10 (Turku, Finland) – SILVER MEDAL
- 2015 NOVOTEL LEUVEN CHIEFS U10 INTERNATIONAL TOURNAMENT (Leuven, Belgium) – 2ND PLACE
- 2014 BELGIAN LEAGUE CHAMPIONS U14
- 2014 BELGIAN LEAGUE CHAMPIONS U16
- 2014 INTERNATIONAL U14 TOURNAMENT (Bad Nauheim, Germany) – 2ND PLACE
- 2014 NOVOTEL LEUVEN CHIEFS U14 INTERNATIONAL TOURNAMENT (Leuven, Belgium) – 1ST PLACE
- 2014 INTERNATIONAL U14 TOURNAMENT (Dordrecht, Netherlands ) – 1ST PLACE
