= Dean Melanson =

Canadian ice hockey player (born 1973)

- Born: November 19, 1973 (age 52) Antigonish, Nova Scotia, Canada
- Height: 5 ft 11 in (180 cm)
- Weight: 200 lb (91 kg; 14 st 4 lb)
- Position: Defence
- Shot: Right
- Played for: Buffalo Sabres; Washington Capitals; Iserlohn Roosters; Kassel Huskies; Milano Vipers; Basingstoke Bison
- NHL draft: 80th overall, 1992; Buffalo Sabres
- Playing career: 1993–2008

Dean Clement Melanson (born November 19, 1973) is a Canadian retired professional ice hockey defenceman. He played 9 games in the National Hockey League with the Buffalo Sabres and Washington Capitals between 1995 and 2001. The rest of his career, which lasted from 1993 to 2008, was spent in the minor leagues and in Europe.

== Biography ==
Melanson was born in Antigonish, Nova Scotia. As a youth, he played in the 1985 and 1986 Quebec International Pee-Wee Hockey Tournaments with a minor ice hockey team from Antigonish.

Melanson was drafted in the fourth round, 80th overall, by the Buffalo Sabres in the 1992 NHL entry draft. Melanson appeared in only nine games in the NHL: five with the Sabres in the 1994–95 season and four with the Washington Capitals in the 2001–02 season. In his brief NHL career, Melanson went scoreless and recorded eight penalty minutes.

The majority of his professional career was spent in the American Hockey League, where he won the Calder Cup in 1996 with the Rochester Americans. He also suited up for teams in the International Hockey League, Germany's Deutsche Eishockey Liga, the Ligue Nord-Américaine de Hockey and the United Hockey League. He also had a spell in Italy for the Milano Vipers. Melanson ended his professional career after playing 11 games with British Elite Ice Hockey League team the Basingstoke Bison in the 2007–08 season.

== Career statistics ==
=== Regular season and playoffs ===
			Regular season					Playoffs
Season	Team	League	GP	G	A	Pts	PIM	GP	G	A	Pts	PIM
1990–91	Saint-Hyacinthe Laser	QMJHL	69	10	17	27	110	4	0	1	1	2
1991–92	Saint-Hyacinthe Laser	QMJHL	42	8	19	27	158	6	1	2	3	25
19920–93	Saint-Hyacinthe Laser	QMJHL	57	13	29	42	253	—	—	—	—	—
1992–93	Rochester Americans	AHL	8	0	1	1	6	14	1	6	7	18
1993–94	Rochester Americans	AHL	80	1	21	22	138	4	0	1	1	2
1994–95	Buffalo Sabres	NHL	5	0	0	0	4	—	—	—	—	—
1994–95	Rochester Americans	AHL	43	4	7	11	84	—	—	—	—	—
1995–96	Rochester Americans	AHL	70	3	13	16	204	14	3	3	6	22
1996–97	Quebec Rafales	IHL	72	3	21	24	95	7	0	2	2	12
1997–98	Rochester Americans	AHL	73	7	9	16	228	4	0	2	2	0
1998–99	Rochester Americans	AHL	79	7	27	34	192	17	3	2	5	32
1999–00	Philadelphia Phantoms	AHL	58	11	25	36	178	4	2	3	5	10
2000–01	Chicago Wolves	IHL	42	1	7	8	80	—	—	—	—	—
2000–01	Philadelphia Phantoms	AHL	15	1	4	5	48	—	—	—	—	—
2000–01	Portland Pirates	AHL	13	1	4	5	14	2	0	0	0	10
2001–02	Washington Capitals	NHL	4	0	0	0	4	—	—	—	—	—
2001–02	Portland Pirates	AHL	70	2	14	16	140	—	—	—	—	—
2002–03	Portland Pirates	AHL	23	1	4	5	40	—	—	—	—	—
2002–03	Binghamton Senators	AHL	35	4	3	7	93	13	0	1	1	48
2003–04	Iserlohn Roosters	DEL	27	4	6	10	150	—	—	—	—	—
2003–04	Saint-Hyacinthe Cousin	QSMHL	3	0	5	5	7	—	—	—	—	—
2004–05	Kassel Huskies	DEL	49	3	6	9	143	—	—	—	—	—
2005–06	Saint-Hyacinthe Cristal	LNAH	30	2	13	15	42	—	—	—	—	—
2005–06	Muskegon Fury	UHL	6	0	0	0	9	12	1	4	5	18
2006–07	Muskegon Fury	UHL	6	1	1	2	12	—	—	—	—	—
2006–07	Milano Vipers	Italy	2	0	0	0	6	8	0	0	0	57
2007–08	Basingstoke Bison	EIHL	11	0	2	2	32	—	—	—	—	—
AHL totals			567	42	132	174	1365	72	9	18	27	142
NHL totals			9	0	0	0	8	—	—	—	—	—
