= Tacoma Sabercats =

- City: Tacoma, Washington
- League: WCHL
- Founded: 1997
- Operated: 1997–2002
- Home arena: Tacoma Dome
- Colors: Red, blue, copper

Championships
- Regular season titles: 1 (1999–00)
- Division titles: 3 (1997–98, 1998–99, 1999–00)
- Taylor Cups: 1 (1998–99)

The Tacoma Sabercats were an American professional minor league ice hockey team based in Tacoma, Washington. The team began play in the West Coast Hockey League as of the 1997–98 season.

Tacoma immediately emerged as a power in the WCHL, winning the regular season Northern Division title and reaching the league finals in its first season. However the Sabercats were defeated by the defending champion San Diego Gulls in the league's Taylor Cup finals.

The following season, 1998–99, Tacoma won its second WCHL Northern Division title and defeated the Gulls in the Taylor Cup finals, becoming the first team other than San Diego to win the WCHL title in the league's history. Although the Sabercats won the WCHL Northern Division a third time in 1999–2000, the team failed to win another league championship.

Despite a strong following in the Tacoma area with over 1,500 season ticket holders, the Sabercats were folded in May 2002 by owner Coach-Sports. They had been eliminated by the Idaho Steelheads in the 2002 WCHL playoffs immediately before ceasing operations.

== Season-by-season record ==
Note: GP = Games played, W = Wins, L = Losses, OTL = Overtime losses, SOL = Shootout losses, Pts = Points, GF = Goals for, GA = Goals against, PIM = Penalties in minutes

Final records.

Season	League	GP	W	L	OTL	SOL	Pts	GF	GA	PIM	Finish	Coach	Playoffs
1997–98	WCHL	64	42	19	-	3	87	300	214	1493	1st, North	John Olver	Lost in finals, 1-4 (San Diego)
1998–99	WCHL	70	44	18	-	8	96	278	234	1627	1st, North	John Olver	Won Taylor Cup, 4-2 (San Diego)
1999–00	WCHL	72	51	12	-	9	111	297	193	1509	1st, North	John Olver	Lost in finals, 0-4 (Phoenix)
2000–01	WCHL	72	31	35	-	6	68	236	247	1608	3rd, North	Robert Dirk	Lost in round 1, 2-3 (Colorado)
2001–02	WCHL	72	30	36	-	6	66	211	249	1573	3rd, North	Robert Dirk	Lost in round 2, 2-3 (Idaho)
