= Brad Cruikshank =

Canadian ice hockey player (born 1979)

- Born: February 14, 1979 (age 47) Kelowna, British Columbia, Canada
- Height: 5 ft 10 in (178 cm)
- Weight: 180 lb (82 kg; 12 st 12 lb)
- Position: Right wing
- Shoots: Right
- Played for: Basingstoke Bison; Sheffield Steelers
- Playing career: 1999–present

Brad Cruikshank (born February 14, 1979, in Kelowna, British Columbia) is a Canadian ice hockey winger.

== Career ==
Cruikshank began his professional career in 1999, playing in the ECHL with the Toledo Storm, followed by a season in the Central Hockey League with the Fayetteville Force. He then returned to the ECHL with the Pensacola Ice Pilots, where he spent three seasons. He moved to the United Hockey League in 2004, signing for the Motor City Mechanics. In 2005, he moved to the Basingstoke Bison, where he became very popular with the fans for his rough style of play. On 22 October 2008, Cruikshank left Basingstoke Bison and moved to the Sheffield Steelers, winning an EIHL League and Playoff double.

Cruikshank was released from the Sheffield Steelers on 25 January 2010. The next day, he signed for the Coventry Blaze for the remainder of the 2009/10 season and winning the EIHL League title for a second consecutive season.

== Career statistics ==
| | | | Regular season | | | | | Playoffs |
| Season | Team | League | GP | G | A | Pts | PIM | GP | G | A | Pts | PIM |
|---|---|---|---|---|---|---|---|---|---|---|---|---|
| 1996–97 | Calgary Hitmen | WHL | 11 | 2 | 1 | 3 | 15 | — | — | — | — | — |
| 1996–97 | Edmonton Ice | WHL | 5 | 0 | 0 | 0 | 0 | — | — | — | — | — |
| 1997–98 | Lethbridge Hurricanes | WHL | 3 | 0 | 0 | 0 | 0 | — | — | — | — | — |
| 1999–00 | Toledo Storm | ECHL | 13 | 2 | 2 | 4 | 16 | — | — | — | — | — |
| 2000–01 | Fayetteville Force | CHL | 68 | 4 | 7 | 11 | 302 | 5 | 2 | 0 | 2 | 2 |
| 2001–02 | Pensacola Ice Pilots | ECHL | 69 | 8 | 12 | 20 | 284 | 3 | 0 | 0 | 0 | 21 |
| 2002–03 | Pensacola Ice Pilots | ECHL | 53 | 3 | 4 | 7 | 221 | 4 | 0 | 0 | 0 | 22 |
| 2003–04 | Pensacola Ice Pilots | ECHL | 55 | 7 | 6 | 13 | 169 | 3 | 0 | 0 | 0 | 2 |
| 2004–05 | Motor City Mechanics | UHL | 62 | 5 | 8 | 13 | 201 | — | — | — | — | — |
| 2005–06 | Basingstoke Bison | EIHL | 35 | 6 | 12 | 18 | 223 | 6 | 0 | 0 | 0 | 22 |
| 2006–07 | Basingstoke Bison | EIHL | 54 | 23 | 24 | 47 | 236 | 2 | 1 | 0 | 1 | 2 |
| 2007–08 | Basingstoke Bison | EIHL | 52 | 26 | 23 | 49 | 203 | — | — | — | — | — |
| 2008–09 | Basingstoke Bison | EIHL | 11 | 5 | 9 | 14 | 70 | — | — | — | — | — |
| 2008–09 | Sheffield Steelers | EIHL | 43 | 19 | 13 | 32 | 168 | 4 | 1 | 3 | 4 | 10 |
| 2009–10 | Sheffield Steelers | EIHL | 35 | 12 | 6 | 18 | 125 | — | — | — | — | — |
| 2009–10 | Coventry Blaze | EIHL | 16 | 7 | 4 | 11 | 85 | 3 | 1 | 1 | 2 | 2 |
| 2010–11 | Coventry Blaze | EIHL | 41 | 15 | 15 | 30 | 176 | 2 | 0 | 0 | 0 | 8 |
| 2011–12 | Lloydminster Border Kings | Chinook HL | 24 | 7 | 10 | 17 | 103 | — | — | — | — | — |
| 2016–17 | Hillmond Hitmen | SASHL | 6 | 5 | 3 | 8 | 18 | 9 | 1 | 3 | 4 | 33 |
| EIHL totals | | | 287 | 113 | 106 | 219 | 1,286 | 17 | 3 | 4 | 7 | 44 |
