= Savo Mitrovic =

Serbian-Canadian ice hockey player

- Born: February 4, 1969 (age 56); Belgrade, Yugoslavia
- Height: 5 ft 11 in (180 cm)
- Weight: 200 lb (91 kg; 14 st 4 lb)
- Position: Centre
- Shot: Right
- Played for: Greensboro Monarchs; Huntsville Blast; Phoenix Mustangs; Detroit Falcons; Port Huron Border Cats
- NHL draft: 1990 NHL Supplemental Draft; Pittsburgh Penguins
- Playing career: 1992–2000

Savo Mitrovic (born February 4, 1969) is a Serbian-Canadian former professional ice hockey player.

Savo Mitrovic contributed greatly to University of New Hampshire men's hockey from 1988 through 1992. He was awarded the 1992 Charles E. Holt Coaches Award.

Mitrovic played for the Greensboro Monarchs and Huntsville Blast in the ECHL, the Phoenix Mustangs of the West Coast Hockey League, the Detroit Falcons and Port Huron Border Cats of the Colonial Hockey League, and the Odessa Jackalopes of the Western Professional Hockey League during his career. He never played in Serbia.
