= Dwight Parrish =

American ice hockey player (born 1972)

- Born: April 6, 1972 (age 54) Southfield, Michigan, U.S.
- Height: 6 ft 0 in (183 cm)
- Weight: 194 lb (88 kg; 13 st 12 lb)
- Position: Defense
- Shot: Right
- Played for: Bracknell Bees; Manchester Phoenix EIHL
- Playing career: 1992–2008

Dwight Parrish (born April 6, 1972) is an American former professional ice hockey player.

== North American career ==
Parrish began his career playing at NCAA level for Ferris State University in his home state of Michigan. In the four seasons Parrish spent with Ferris State, he established himself as a solid team player, featuring 139 times, totalling 35 points and 265 penalty minutes along the way.

For the 1996/97 season, Parrish would initially sign for the IHL Michigan K-Wings but played just twice before moving to the Fort Wayne Komets, again at IHL level. Parrish failed to settle again, and featured just twice more before moving again, this time to play at the higher ECHL standard with the Dayton Bombers. Parrish became a cornerstone of the Bombers team, playing in more than 60 regular season games. He would stay with the Bombers for the 1997/98 season and again played on a regular basis, this time featuring almost 70 times.

Parrish would fail to remain with the Bombers for the entire season however, and returned for brief spells with the Michigan K-Wings and the Fort Wayne Komets. Parrish would end the season playing in the AHL though, regarded as the second tier of ice hockey in North America under the NHL. He featured in five games at AHL level, splitting them between the Providence Bruins and the Syracuse Crunch.

Despite failing to secure a long-term future with either franchise, Parrish showed that he had enough ability to compete at AHL standard, and signed for the Portland Pirates for the 1998/99 season. He proved to be a solid signing, and played in 54 games for the first team, totalling 138 penalty minutes. For the 1999/2000 season, Parrish would feature again for the Pirates, although just seven times before returning to the lower ECHL, where he played the rest of the season, 72 games, for the Hampton Roads Admirals.

== British career ==
Parrish would make a significant decision for the 2000/01 season. Seeking a more certain future, he moved to Europe and signed for the Cardiff Devils, a Welsh team playing in the ISL, the highest level of professional ice hockey in the U.K. at the time. After a successful season with the Devils, Parrish chose to remain in the U.K. and signed for the Manchester Storm. Parrish played for the Storm all the way to the play-off final, but the Storm lost on penalty shots to the Sheffield Steelers.

Parrish would stay in Manchester for the following year, one dominated by off-ice events for the Storm. Due to a cash crisis, the team was unable to continue and in November folded, playing their last game in Manchester against the London Knights on October 17, 2002. Despite this setback, Parrish would choose to stay in England and began to play for the Basingstoke Bison of the BNL with whom he would finish the season.

Despite the collapse of the first Manchester franchise, Parrish would choose to return to the city for the 2003/04 season with the Manchester Phoenix, playing their inaugural season in the newly formed EIHL. Parrish took up where he had left off with the Storm, and was a cornerstone of the defense, playing 60 games and helping out with 22 points. Again financial problems would dog the Manchester organisation and the franchise was temporarily suspended towards the end of the 2003/04 season. Parrish would stay in the EIHL though, and signed for the Phoenix' fierce rivals, the Sheffield Steelers.

Parrish played just three times for the Steelers before returning to the BNL with the Bracknell Bees, a team which had faced the Storm in the now defunct ISL. Seeking consistency, Parrish would re-sign for the Bees in the 2006/07 season, now playing in the EPL. He would soon take on a great deal of responsibility and would be appointed player/coach for the 2007/08 term. Despite a successful season with Bracknell, in the summer of 2008, Parrish would re-sign to play for the Phoenix under head coach Tony Hand. On December 23, 2008, Parrish disclosed that he was retiring from playing professional ice hockey to take up an employment offer outside the sport back in his native Michigan.

As a mark of respect for his services towards ice hockey in Manchester for both the Storm and Phoenix organisations, Parrish's number 17 shirt was the first to be retired by the Phoenix, a decision which was announced at Parrish's last game, a 3-2 home win against the Newcastle Vipers. As of July 20, 2015 Dwight Parrish was hired on as an assistant coach for the Manchester Phoenix making $52,500 (dollars) annually

== Career statistics ==
			Regular season					Playoffs				
Season	Team	League	GP	G	A	Pts	PIM	GP	G	A	Pts	PIM
1992–93	Ferris State University	NCAA	40	0	5	5	66	-	-	-	-	-
1993–94	Ferris State University	NCAA	38	1	15	16	60	-	-	-	-	-
1994–95	Ferris State University	NCAA	36	3	6	9	76	-	-	-	-	-
1995–96	Ferris State University	NCAA	25	0	5	5	61	-	-	-	-	-
1996–97	Michigan K-Wings	IHL	2	0	0	0	0	-	-	-	-	-
1996–97	Fort Wayne Komets	IHL	2	0	0	0	0	-	-	-	-	-
1996–97	Dayton Bombers	ECHL	57	3	14	17	90	4	0	0	0	28
1997–98	Michigan K-Wings	IHL	2	0	0	0	0	-	-	-	-	-
1997–98	Fort Wayne Komets	IHL	3	0	1	1	4	-	-	-	-	-
1997–98	Syracuse Crunch	AHL	3	0	0	0	0	-	-	-	-	-
1997–98	Providence Bruins	AHL	2	0	0	0	4	-	-	-	-	-
1997–98	Dayton Bombers	ECHL	62	9	18	27	139	5	0	1	1	12
1998–99	Portland Pirates	AHL	54	2	4	6	138	-	-	-	-	-
1999–00	Portland Pirates	AHL	7	0	1	1	7	-	-	-	-	-
1999–00	Hampton Roads Admirals	ECHL	62	5	9	14	199	10	0	2	2	17
2000–01	Cardiff Devils	ISL	48	0	4	4	54	6	1	3	4	6
2001–02	Manchester Storm	ISL	48	9	8	17	50	8	0	1	1	17
2002–03	Basingstoke Bison	FBNL	24	5	7	12	30	6	0	2	2	8
2003–04	Manchester Phoenix	EIHL	54	7	12	19	56	6	0	3	3	6
2004–05	Bracknell Bees	BNL	25	0	7	7	22	-	-	-	-	-
2004–05	Bracknell Bees	Crossover League	6	0	1	1	2	-	-	-	-	-
2004–05	Sheffield Steelers	Crossover League	3	0	0	0	2	-	-	-	-	-
2006–07	Bracknell Bees	EPL	43	8	13	21	163	6	1	1	2	10
2007–08	Bracknell Bees	EPL	34	4	13	17	89	-	-	-	-	-
2008–09	Manchester Phoenix	EIHL	33	3	10	13	18	-	-	-	-	-
Career totals			716	59	153	212	1330	51	2	13	15	104
