= Jeff Madill =

Canadian ice hockey player

- Born: June 21, 1965 (age 59); Oshawa, Ontario, Canada
- Height: 5 ft 11 in (180 cm)
- Weight: 212 lb (96 kg; 15 st 2 lb)
- Position: Right Wing
- Shot: Right
- Played for: New Jersey Devils
- NHL draft: 1987 NHL Supplemental Draft; New Jersey Devils
- Playing career: 1987–2005

Jeff Madill (born June 21, 1965) is a Canadian former professional ice hockey right winger. He was drafted by the New Jersey Devils in the 1987 NHL Supplemental Draft, and played 14 games for them during the 1990–91 season. The rest of his career, which lasted from 1987 to 1997, was spent in the American Hockey League and International Hockey League.

== Biography ==
Madill was born in Oshawa, Ontario. As a youth, he played in the 1978 Quebec International Pee-Wee Hockey Tournament with a minor ice hockey team from Oshawa.

After playing three seasons with the Ohio State Buckeyes, Madill made his professional debut with the Utica Devils of the American Hockey League in 1987–88. Madill played four seasons with Utica before making his National Hockey League debut with New Jersey in 1990–91. He played fourteen regular season and seven playoff games with the Devils that season. He also became the first Devil to score his first NHL goal in his debut game.

Madill played six seasons in the International Hockey League with seven different teams before retiring in 1998.

While serving as an assistant coach for the Kansas City Outlaws of the United Hockey League during the 2004–05 season, Madill suited up and played in the club's final game of the season. In that game, he showed why he'd been given the nickname "Mad Dog," amassing 21 penalty minutes in three shifts. He has a daughter and son.

== Career statistics ==
=== Regular season and playoffs ===
			Regular season					Playoffs
Season	Team	League	GP	G	A	Pts	PIM	GP	G	A	Pts	PIM
1982–83	North York Rangers	OJHL	31	3	18	21	94	—	—	—	—	—
1983–84	North York Rangers	OJHL	40	44	41	85	94	—	—	—	—	—
1984–85	Ohio State University	CCHA	12	5	6	11	18	—	—	—	—	—
1985–86	Ohio State University	CCHA	41	32	25	57	65	—	—	—	—	—
1986–87	Ohio State University	CCHA	43	38	32	70	139	—	—	—	—	—
1987–88	Utica Devils	AHL	58	18	15	33	127	—	—	—	—	—
1988–89	Utica Devils	AHL	69	23	25	48	225	4	1	0	1	35
1989–90	Utica Devils	AHL	74	43	26	69	233	4	1	2	3	33
1990–91	New Jersey Devils	NHL	14	4	0	4	46	7	0	2	2	8
1990–91	Utica Devils	AHL	54	42	35	77	151	—	—	—	—	—
1991–92	Kansas City Blades	IHL	62	32	20	52	167	6	2	2	4	30
1992–93	Cincinnati Cyclones	IHL	58	36	17	53	175	—	—	—	—	—
1992–93	Milwaukee Admirals	IHL	23	13	6	19	53	4	3	0	3	9
1993–94	Atlanta Knights	IHL	80	42	44	86	186	14	4	2	6	33
1994–95	Denver Grizzlies	IHL	73	35	30	65	207	17	8	6	14	53
1995–96	San Francisco Spiders	IHL	27	16	13	29	73	—	—	—	—	—
1995–96	Kansas City Blades	IHL	41	17	16	33	169	5	4	2	6	21
1996–97	Kansas City Blades	IHL	59	18	18	36	42	—	—	—	—	—
1996–97	Phoenix Roadrunners	IHL	9	5	2	7	22	—	—	—	—	—
IHL totals			432	214	166	380	1094	46	21	12	33	146
NHL totals			14	4	0	4	46	7	0	2	2	8

== Awards and honours ==
Award	Year
CCHA All-Tournament Team	1987
