= Kamil Tvrdek =

Czech ice hockey player

- Born: September 9, 1983 (age 42) Karlovy Vary, Czechoslovakia
- Height: 6 ft 0 in (183 cm)
- Weight: 194 lb (88 kg; 13 st 12 lb)
- Position: Left wing
- Shot: Left
- Played for: HC Karlovy Vary; MsHK Žilina; Ferencvárosi TC
- Playing career: 2001–2016

Kamil Tvrdek (born September 9, 1983) is a Czech former professional ice hockey left winger.

Tvrdek played a total of 84 games in the Czech Extraliga for HC Karlovy Vary, from 2001 to 2008. He also played in the Slovak Extraliga for MsHK Žilina and the MOL Liga for Ferencvárosi TC.
