= Rick Brebant =

Canadian ice hockey player

- Born: 21 February 1964 (age 62) Elliot Lake, Ontario, Canada
- Height: 5 ft 10 in (178 cm)
- Weight: 180 lb (82 kg; 12 st 12 lb)
- Position: Centre
- Shot: Left
- Played for: Carolina Thunderbirds; Durham Wasps; Cardiff Devils; Nottingham Panthers; Newcastle Cobras; Manchester Storm; London Knights; Sheffield Steelers; Manchester Phoenix
- Playing career: 1987–2004

Richard Joseph "Rick" Brebant (born 21 February 1964) is a retired ice hockey player who played mainly in Great Britain. He is a member of the British Ice Hockey Hall of Fame.

== Career ==
=== Club ===
Born in Elliot Lake, Ontario, Canada, Brebant started his professional career by playing the start of the 1987–88 season with the Carolina Thunderbirds in the All-American Hockey League (a predecessor of the East Coast Hockey League). However, he left the club part way through the season to join the Durham Wasps who were playing in the Premier Division of the British Hockey League (BHL). Brebant stayed with the Wasps for six seasons. During his time with the Wasps he helped them to win the Norwich Union Cup in 1988–89 and 1990–91, the Premier Division in 1988–89, 1990–91 and 1991–92, and the playoffs in 1988, 1991 and 1992. Brebant, himself, was named to the All-star team three times during this period as well as being named the British Ice Hockey Writers Association Player of the Year in 1990–91.

In 1993, Brebant moved to the Cardiff Devils where he helped the team win the Premier Division and the playoffs in 1993–94. Brebant, again, was named to the All-star team this season. The following season, 1994–95, Brebant moved to the Nottingham Panthers where he helped the team win the Benson and Hedges Cup (B&H Cup) and himself to his fifth time on the All-star team.

Brebant returned to the Durham Wasps for the 1995–96 season before the team relocated to Newcastle for the 1996–97 season as the Newcastle Cobras in the newly formed Ice Hockey Superleague (ISL) and he became the team's player-coach. After only a few games at the beginning of the 1997–98 season, Brebant moved to the Manchester Storm. The following season, still with Manchester, Brebant helped the team to win the B&H Cup and the league. Brebant stayed with Manchester for the beginning of the 1999–00 season before finishing the season with the London Knights.

For the 2000–01 season, Brebant moved to the Sheffield Steelers to play as an assistant coach under head coach, Mike Blaisdell, a friend from his time with the Durham Wasps. During the 2000–01 season, Brebant helped the team to a grand-slam by winning the B&H Cup, the Challenge Cup, the league, and the playoffs. The following season he helped the team to win the playoffs and, in the 2002–03 season, to win the Challenge Cup and the league.

In 2003, Brebant moved back to Manchester for his final season in ice hockey, this time with the Manchester Phoenix in the Elite Ice Hockey League and again as a player-coach.

=== International ===
Brebant was first selected to play for the Great Britain national ice hockey team in 1994 in Pool A of the Ice Hockey World Championships. Brebant's only point during the tournament was a shorthanded goal against his home country, Canada, which Brebant has described as his favourite goal.

Brebant was a regular member of the GB team throughout the late 1990s and early 2000s making a total of 32 appearances and scoring ten goals and 26 points.

== Awards ==
- Named to the Premier Division All-star Team in 1989, 1991, 1992, 1994 and 1995.
- British Ice Hockey Writers Association Player of the Year in 1990–91.
- Inducted to British Ice Hockey Hall of Fame in 2004.

== Records ==
- Highest BHL Premier Division points scorer in 1988–89, 1990–91 and 1991–92.
- All time goal, assist and point scorer for Durham Wasps.
- Most assists in a single season for Durham Wasps.
- Most points in a single season for Durham Wasps.

== Career statistics ==
=== Club ===
| | | | Regular season | | | | | Playoffs | | | | |
| Season | Team | League | GP | G | A | Pts | PIM | GP | G | A | Pts | PIM |
|---|---|---|---|---|---|---|---|---|---|---|---|---|
| 1987–88 | Carolina Thunderbirds | AAHL | 14 | 25 | 24 | 49 | 40 | | | | | |
| 1987–88 | Durham Wasps | BHL | 25 | 77 | 75 | 152 | 18 | 6 | 14 | 13 | 27 | 14 |
| 1988–89 | Durham Wasps | BHL | 36 | 99 | 119 | 219 | 67 | 5 | 12 | 10 | 22 | 6 |
| 1989–90 | Durham Wasps | BHL | 31 | 64 | 70 | 134 | 44 | 4 | 4 | 8 | 12 | 6 |
| 1990–91 | Durham Wasps | BHL | 35 | 93 | 116 | 209 | 72 | 8 | 18 | 34 | 52 | 16 |
| 1991–92 | Durham Wasps | BHL | 34 | 78 | 82 | 160 | 99 | 8 | 17 | 16 | 33 | 26 |
| 1992–93 | Durham Wasps | BHL | 34 | 59 | 62 | 121 | 84 | | | | | |
| 1993–94 | Cardiff Devils | BHL | 64 | 119 | 154 | 273 | 130 | 8 | 16 | 19 | 35 | 8 |
| 1994–95 | Nottingham Panthers | BHL | 39 | 58 | 95 | 153 | 78 | 7 | 6 | 18 | 24 | 4 |
| 1995–96 | Durham Wasps | BHL | 24 | 19 | 60 | 79 | 56 | 7 | 3 | 11 | 14 | 20 |
| 1996–97 | Newcastle Cobras | ISL | 22 | 9 | 20 | 29 | 68 | | | | | |
| 1997–98 | Newcastle Cobras | ISL | 4 | 1 | 1 | 2 | 14 | | | | | |
| 1997–98 | Manchester Storm | ISL | 33 | 10 | 23 | 33 | 50 | 9 | 1 | 6 | 7 | 8 |
| 1998–99 | Manchester Storm | ISL | 39 | 13 | 19 | 32 | 40 | 7 | 3 | 5 | 8 | 18 |
| 1999–00 | Manchester Storm | ISL | 18 | 8 | 12 | 20 | 20 | | | | | |
| 1999–00 | London Knights | ISL | 19 | 9 | 14 | 23 | 32 | 8 | 3 | 8 | 11 | 10 |
| 2000–01 | Sheffield Steelers | ISL | 45 | 10 | 32 | 42 | 94 | 8 | 3 | 4 | 7 | 8 |
| 2001–02 | Sheffield Steelers | ISL | 42 | 13 | 30 | 43 | 36 | 8 | 1 | 8 | 9 | 13 |
| 2002–03 | Sheffield Steelers | ISL | 23 | 6 | 9 | 15 | 24 | 17 | 1 | 7 | 8 | 46 |
| 2003–04 | Manchester Phoenix | EIHL | 32 | 2 | 25 | 27 | 60 | 6 | 1 | 1 | 2 | 2 |

=== International ===
| Year | Team | Event | GP | G | A | Pts | PIM |
|---|---|---|---|---|---|---|---|
| 1994 | Great Britain | Ice Hockey World Championships | 6 | 1 | 0 | 1 | 8 |
| 1995 | Great Britain | Olympic Qualifiers | | | | | |
| 1998 | Great Britain | World Championships Pool B | | | | | |
| 1999 | Great Britain | World Championships Pool A Qualifiers | 3 | 0 | 1 | 1 | 4 |
| 2000 | Great Britain | World Championships Pool B | 7 | 4 | 4 | 8 | 14 |
| 2000 | Great Britain | Olympic Qualifiers | | | | | |
| 2002 | Great Britain | World Championships Division 1 | 5 | 1 | 1 | 2 | 0 |

== Footnotes ==
Awards
| Preceded by Steve Moria | BIHWA Player of the Year; 1990–91 | Succeeded by Dan Dorion |
Sporting positions
| Preceded by First Head Coach | Newcastle Cobras Head Coach; 1996–97, 1997–98 | Succeeded by Dale Lambert |
| Preceded by First Head Coach | Manchester Phoenix Head Coach; 2003–04 | Succeeded by Paul Heavey |
