= Manchester Phoenix =

Ice hockey team in Cheshire, England

Manchester Phoenix Ice Hockey Club
- City: Altrincham (2007–2015); Deeside, North Wales (2015–2016); Blackpool (2016–2017); Widnes, Cheshire (2017)
- League: English Premier Ice Hockey League
- Founded: 2003
- Folded: 2017
- Home arena: Widnes Arena (2017)
- Colors: White, Black, Red
- Owner: (United Kingdom) Neil Morris
- General manager: (United Kingdom) (N/A) – Neil Morris
- Head coach: (United Kingdom) Tony Hand, MBE
- Captain: (United Kingdom) Luke Boothroyd

Manchester Phoenix were a semi professional ice hockey team from Greater Manchester, England. The club was formed in 2003 as a result of the efforts of supporters group Friends of Manchester Ice Hockey to bring top-level ice hockey back to Manchester after Manchester Storm folded in 2002.

The Phoenix team was a founder member of the Elite Ice Hockey League upon its formation in 2003, playing in the 17,500 capacity Manchester Arena. The cost of using such a large facility proved financially untenable, and Phoenix suspended playing operations in 2004 pending the construction of a smaller purpose built ice facility. Construction of the Altrincham Ice Dome commenced in 2006, and the club returned to the Elite League for the 2006–07 season. After three seasons in the EIHL, the club joined the English Premier Ice Hockey League on 30 April 2009.

During their time in EPIHL, the club was fairly successful, having won two league championships and one playoff final, with multiple appearances at the playoff finals weekend.

In 2015, the club was left without a home rink within Greater Manchester. They played their home games at Deeside Leisure Centre in North Wales, Fylde Coast Ice Arena in Blackpool, and finally at Widnes Ice Arena.

The club folded on 31 January 2017 after an unsuccessful meeting with potential investors.

== History ==
=== Origins ===
In 2002, the Manchester Storm, once the best-supported Ice Hockey club in Europe, ran into serious financial trouble and was folded. Initially fans protested against SMG, the company who owned the Manchester Evening News Arena as it was perceived that troubles had arisen due to SMG's disinterest in continuing to house the Storm at the Manchester Evening News Arena. This soon turned into a rally in support of the team and a supporters group known as 'The Friends of Manchester Storm' was established after Gary Cowan, the owner of the Storm officially announced he was finalising the organisation's operations due to unsustainable debts. Once it became clear that the Storm were not to return, FOMS changed their name, becoming the 'Friends of Manchester Ice Hockey', or 'FOMIH'.

This group had two established aims, namely to bring top level professional ice hockey back to Manchester and to ensure the creation of a new ice rink facility in the region. In 2003, a club was formed and with fans choosing to symbolically title the team the 'Manchester Phoenix', rising from the ashes of the Storm.

=== Initial playing operations ===
The newly formed Manchester Phoenix would be one of the founding members of the British Elite Ice Hockey League and played out of the MEN Arena for their inaugural season. Under player-coach Rick Brebant, and later Paul Heavey, the team finished sixth out of eight in the league, the final qualifying place for the playoffs. Phoenix finished second in their Playoff group ahead of the Belfast Giants, qualifying for the semi-final, where they were beaten 6–1 by the Nottingham Panthers.

Despite an impressive beginning, with 3,600 turning out for the first home game against the London Racers, crowds would not be consistent and it soon became apparent that ice hockey at the busiest indoor venue in Europe would no longer be viable with the season's average attendance being just 2,150 per game, falling far short of the rumoured number of 3,000 needed to cover costs. As a result, the Phoenix temporarily suspended playing operations at the end of the 2003–04 season.

In May 2004 the Phoenix announced that they had the funding to construct a new temporary ice rink but problems arose as to exactly where to locate the facility. As a result, the deadline for inclusion in the EIHL passed, and the Phoenix withdrew from the 2004–05 season. The club had still not managed to build a new venue by the following year, and announced that the Phoenix would not be part of the 2005–06 season either. In November 2005, the club announced details of a new rink to be built in partnership with Nikal, David McLean and Trafford Metropolitan Borough Council. The new rink would seat 2,026, with 24 wheelchair spaces, and standing for approx 4–500. Planning permission for the rink was finally granted in early January 2006 and construction began on 30 March, with the rink to be sited in Altrincham.

With progress being made, the Phoenix confirmed their inclusion in the EIHL once again, for the 2006–07 season with the Ice Dome scheduled to host its first game on 24 September 2006. The Phoenix also announced the appointment of Tony Hand as player/head coach. This was regarded as a huge step forward for the organisation, as Hand is regarded by many as the greatest British ice hockey player of all time. Unfortunately for Hand and the team, unexpected delays followed and so in the interim Phoenix home games were held at either IceSheffield or Deeside Leisure Centre. After further construction and two further missed completion dates, the rink eventually opened with a reduced capacity of 1,000 on 25 February 2007, with Phoenix playing host to the Basingstoke Bison. It was the first time professional hockey had been played in Manchester for almost three years. The remaining 700 seats were installed over the following months, with the Dome completely ready for the beginning of the 2007–08 season.

For further information, please see 2006–07 Manchester Phoenix season.

=== Demise ===
On the weekend of the 2015 playoff finals, it was announced by Silver Blades that they were unable to reach agreement with the club to renew the ice time agreement despite an offer of reduced rental costs. Further details were given on the 8th April. Manchester Phoenix issued a statement refuting the allegations made of unpaid rental costs.

As a result of this, the club left themselves homeless, but with plans to build a new arena in Manchester City Centre. While this was being prepared however, it was announced that the club would play in Deeside for the 2015–2016 season.

In June 2016, it was announced that Manchester Phoenix would move to Eastlands for the 2016/2017 season. However unrealistic time scales and planning delays meant that this rink was not able to be started in time for the season. Instead, the club chose to play from the Fylde Ice Arena, Blackpool.

Again the proposed timescales proved unachievable and, the new rink was not able to be even started in time for January 2017, making the business model of playing from Blackpool unviable. As a result, the club was forced to release its imported playing staff and move to Silver Blades Widnes. This added pressure, and the unlikely prospect of the club being able to fund a permanent home in Manchester, meant that the club was forced to fold halfway through the 2016/17 season.

=== Earlier seasons ===
==== 2007–08 season ====
Form continued to be hard to find for the Phoenix though. Despite scoring significant numbers of goals, the Phoenix defence proved to be anything but watertight and high scoring games became a regular occurrence. Manchester closed the regular season on 23 April with a 6–2 away loss to the Hull Stingrays, finishing 7th in the EIHL. This was perceived by many fans to be somewhat of an underachievement by the organisation.

The Phoenix's seventh-placed finish ensured a post-season matchup with their fiercest rivals, the Sheffield Steelers. Again two high scoring games would follow; the Phoenix lost 5–4 in Sheffield, ensuring a tense return leg at the Ice Dome. Despite scoring four goals, the Phoenix defence again proved to be a problem, with the game ending 4–4 in front of a sell out crowd of 2150. The draw meant that the Phoenix exited the playoffs in the first round for the second year in a row.

==== 2008–09 season ====
For a game-by-game log, see 2008–09 Manchester Phoenix Season

==== 2009–10 season ====
The team finished the season in 3rd place, and qualified for the EPL post season play-offs. They defeated the Peterborough Phantoms 6–5 on aggregate in the quarter-finals to progress to the finals weekend in Coventry, where they were defeated in their semi final by the Slough Jets.

==== 2010–11 season ====
On 27 March 2011, Manchester Phoenix played Swindon Wildcats at home on the last day of the season. Going into the game, Manchester Phoenix needed a single point to secure the league title. They beat Swindon 5–2 picking up two points and therefore were crowned league champions, earning the club's first major trophy.

==== 2011–12 season ====
Despite losing player/coach Tony Hand to a serious injury, the club managed to remain competitive and finished a creditable 2nd in the league. The Club subsequently qualified for the play off finals weekend, where they defeated local rivals the Sheffield Steeldogs in the semi-final, before losing to the Slough Jets in the final game

==== 2012–13 season ====
The Phoenix finished the season 3rd in the league, and also reached the Cup semi finals, losing to Guildford Flames. However, in the end of season play off finals, the club took their revenge beating Guildford 5–2 and emerged victorious, claiming their first play off title in the process.

==== 2013–14 season ====
On 16 March 2014 Manchester Phoenix won their second league title after beating close rivals Basingstoke Bison 5–2. The Phoenix had been in contention for the title throughout the season, but only clinched the title with 1 round of fixtures remaining. The club proceeded to qualify for the Play Off Finals weekend, where they were unable to defend their Play Off title, finishing as runner up.

==== 2014–15 season ====
On 3 April 2015, the eve of the 2015 playoff finals weekend, it was announced that Red Hockey UK purchased 34% of the Phoenix's shares, Red Hockey UK already owned the Bracknell Bees (49% of shares) and Telford Tigers (100%). The owners announced that they would be leaving Altrincham, moving the club to a new rink in central Manchester.

It was also during this weekend that Silver Blades made the announcement that their proposal concerning the renewal of the ice time agreement could not be agreed with the club despite the offer of reduced rental costs, which left the club playing all their "home" games in Deeside, North Wales, Blackpool, and Widnes during the following 2 seasons.

== Statistics ==
These figures does not include the 2016–2017 season where all Manchester Phoenix results were scrubbed due to the club folding mid season.

Regular Season Games Played: 648

Regular Season Games Won: 325

Regular Season Win Percentage: .590

Regular Season Goals Scored:2,220

Regular Season Goals Against: 1,953

== Attendance ==
The club attracted a significantly lower set of attendance figures than the Manchester Storm did. During the team's first season, the average attendance for all home league fixtures was given as 2,267, in a 17,245-seat arena (although only 4,500 of the lower bowl seats were made available for public use during games. This comprised the seating blocks along the sides of the ice, with those behind the goals being inaccessible). When the move to Altrincham was completed, the attendance averaged 800, climbing to 1,027 in the 09–10 season. This made the club the third-best attended club in the EPIHL, behind the Guildford Flames and Milton Keynes Lightning, and the ninth overall in Great Britain.

== Club records ==
Appearances: Luke Boothroyd: 442 appearances. (2008–2017)

Points (Overall): Tony Hand: 655 (2006–present)

Points (Season): Tony Hand: 133 during regular season (2010–11)

Goals (Season): Marcus Kristoffersson: 62 regular season (2010–11 season)

PIMS: Tony Hand: 469

Attendance Single Game (MEN Arena): 3,600 (estimate), Vs. London Racers, 14 September 2003

Attendance Single Game (Altrincham): 2,100 (estimate), Vs. Basingstoke Bison, Sunday 3 March 2013, Vs. Peterborough Phantoms, Saturday 8 March 2013

Games between shut-outs: 212, between 15 March 2008 (2–0 loss to Cardiff Devils) to 30 October 2011 (3–0 loss to Basingstoke Bison). (details taken from club's official results database)

== Honours and awards ==
=== 2003–04 ===
- Jayme Platt – EIHL Second Team All Star

=== 2006–07 ===
- Johan Molin – EIHL Second Team All Star
- 'EIHL Leading British Scorer (League)' – Tony Hand

=== 2007–08 ===
- Joe Tallari – EIHL First Team All Star
- 'Man of Ice' Awards – 'Hard As Ice' – Brett Clouthier
- 'Man of Ice' Awards – 'Best Newcomer' – Joe Tallari
- 'EIHL Leading British Scorer (League)' – Tony Hand

=== 2008–09 ===
- Runner-up 2008–09 Knockout Cup
- Runner-up 2008–09 Challenge Cup
- Elite League Player of the Year – David-Alexandre Beauregard
- Best British Netminder – Stephen Murphy
- Best British Forward – Tony Hand
- David-Alexandre Beauregard – EIHL First Team All Star
- Tony Hand – EIHL Second Team All Star
- 'Man of Ice' Awards – 'Fans Favourite' – David-Alexandre Beauregard
- 'Man of Ice' Awards – 'Forward of the Year' – David-Alexandre Beauregard
- 'Man of Ice' Awards – 'Hard As Ice' – Brett Clouthier
- 'Man of Ice' Awards – 'Best Newcomer' – David-Alexandre Beauregard
- 'Man of Ice' Awards – 'Player of the Year' – David-Alexandre Beauregard
- 'Man of Ice' Awards – 'Outstanding Achievement' – Tony Hand
- 'Man of Ice' Awards – '4000 Points Total' – Tony Hand

=== 2009–10 ===
- Finished 3rd place EPL League
- Semi-finalists Play-off's
- Semi-finalists EPL Cup
- 'EPL All Star 1st Team' – Tony Hand
- 'EPL All Star 2nd Team' – Ed Courtenay

=== 2010–11 ===
- English Premier League Champions
- Semi-finalists Play-off's
- Semi-finalists EPL Cup
- 'EPIHL All Star 1st Team'- Steve Fone, Ladislav Harabin, Marcus Kristoffersson, Tony Hand
- 'EPIHL All Star 2nd Team'- Pavel Gomenyuk, Curtis Huppe
- 'EPIHL Player of the Year'- Tony Hand
- 'EPIHL Coach of the Year'- Tony Hand

=== 2011–12 ===
- Finished 2nd place EPL League
- Runner-up Play-off's
- Semi-finalists EPL Cup
- 'EPIHL All star 2nd Team' – Martin Cingel

=== 2012–13 ===
- Finished 3rd place EPL League
- English Premier League Play Off Champions
- Semi-finalists EPL Cup
- 'EPIHL All Star 1st Team' – Luke Boothroyd
- 'EPIHL All Star 2nd Team' – Michal Psurny

=== 2013–14 ===
- English Premier League Champions
- Runner-up 2013–14 Playoffs
- Semi-finalists EPL Cup
- 'EPIHL All Star 1st Team' – Stephen Fone, Luke Boothroyd, Michal Psurny
- 'EPIHL All Star 2nd Team' – Robert Schnabel, Tony Hand, Robin Kovar
- 'EPIHL Coach of the Year' – Tony Hand
- 'EPIHL Player of the Year' – Luke Boothroyd

== Retired numbers ==
- #9 (Scotland) Tony Hand – Jersey retired for exceptional service to Manchester Phoenix.
- #17 (United States) Dwight Parrish – Jersey retired for services to ice hockey in Manchester.

== Head coaches ==
Individuals who have been appointed head coach of the Manchester Phoenix:

- 2003–04 Rick Brebant
- 2004–05 Paul Heavey
- 2006 – 2017 Tony Hand

== Club captains ==
Players who have captained the Manchester Phoenix:

- 2003–04
- #41 (United States) George Awada
- 2006–08
- #06 (Canada) Scott Basiuk
- 2008–09
- #05 (Canada) Kenton Smith
- 2009 – 2017
- #04 (United Kingdom) Luke Boothroyd

== Two-team players ==
Players who have featured for both the Manchester Phoenix and the Manchester Storm (original and current teams bearing the name) in league fixtures:

- #09 (United States) Mark Bultje
- #15 (Canada) Mike Morin
- #17 (United States) Dwight Parrish
- #18 (United Kingdom) Alan Hough
- #21 (Canada) Jeff Sebastian
- #91 (Canada) Nick Poole
- #93 (United Kingdom) Rick Brebant
- #89 (United Kingdom) Ciaran Long
- #18 (United Kingdom) Jake Nurse
- #30 (United Kingdom) Phillip Spanswick
- #31 (United Kingdom) Declan Ryan
- #61 (United Kingdom) Jared Dickinson

== NHL draftees ==
Players who have played for the Manchester Phoenix who have been selected in NHL entry drafts:

NHL Draftees
Position		Player	Draft Position	Draft Year	Draft Team
F	(United Kingdom)	Tony Hand	252nd	1986	Edmonton Oilers
RW	(Canada)	Ed Courtenay	5th	1991 Exp	San Jose Sharks
D	(Canada)	Jeff Sebastian	115th	1991	Winnipeg Jets
LW	(Canada)	Andre Payette	244th	1994	Philadelphia Flyers
LW	(Canada)	David Beauregard	271st	1994	San Jose Sharks
G	(United States)	Scott Fankhouser	276th	1994	St. Louis Blues
D	(Canada)	Mike Lankshear	66th	1996	Toronto Maple Leafs
LW	(Canada)	K.C. Timmons	141st	1998	Colorado Avalanche
LW	(Canada)	Brett Clouthier	50th	1999	New Jersey Devils
D	(Canada)	Jeff MacMillan	215th	1999	Dallas Stars
C	(Canada)	Brian Passmore	199th	2000	Minnesota Wild
RW	(Canada)	Kyle Bruce	231st	2001	Florida Panthers
C	(Canada)	Grant Jacobsen	270th	2001	St. Louis Blues
D	(Slovakia)	Radoslav Hecl	208th	2002	Buffalo Sabres
RW	(Sweden)	Marcus Kristoffersson	105th	1997	Dallas Stars
D	(Czech Republic)	Robert Schnabel	79th – 1997 129th – 1998	1997 1998	New York Islanders Phoenix Coyotes
C	(Czech Republic)	Robin Kovář	123rd	2002	Edmonton Oilers
