= Basingstoke Bison =

Ice Hockey club from Basingstoke, England

- City: Basingstoke, Hampshire, England
- League: NIHL
- Division: National League
- Founded: 1988
- Home arena: Planet Ice Basingstoke; Capacity: 2,000
- Colours: White, Green & Black
- Owners: Steve Nell, Danny Kimber & Rob Firmin
- Head coach: Jeff Flanagan
- Captain: George Norcliffe (England)
- Website: Basingstoke Bison

Franchise history
- 1988–95: Basingstoke Beavers
- 1995–: Basingstoke Bison

The Basingstoke Bison are an English Ice Hockey club from Basingstoke. They currently compete in the NIHL National League and have previously been members of the Ice Hockey Superleague and its successor the Elite Ice Hockey League.

== History ==
Formed in 1988 as the Basingstoke Beavers, the club became the "Bison" in 1995. Their team logo is very similar to the "Goathead" used by the Buffalo Sabres from 1996 to 2006. Joining the Superleague in 1996, the Bison dropped out in 1998 and joined the British National League. In 2003 they joined the newly formed Elite Ice Hockey League.

Despite being one of the lower-budget teams in the EIHL, the Bison maintained their fan base and greatly enhanced local sponsorships and doubled their season ticket sales. This success is mainly testament to the hard work of Mark Bernard, who occupied the general manager and head coach role with the club during the 2004/05 and 2005/06 seasons. Bernard also stepped into the netminder's role part way through the latter season after Jayme Platt had left the team.

In May 2006, Bernard left the club to take up the assistant general manager's post with American Hockey League club, the Norfolk Admirals. Prior to his departure, Bernard secured the services of a number of the players that made up the 05/06 roster.

In June 2006, Planet Ice announced that the new player/coach of the club would be former club captain Doug Sheppard, with former Bison and London Racers defenceman Duncan Dalmao returning as player/assistant coach. Sheppard set about building his roster around the core that he had inherited from Bernard. The Bison embarked upon a successful year under Sheppard, securing their highest ever Elite League finish, and taking many points off the top sides in the League.

In April 2007, David Taylor, owner of the Bracknell Bees, purchased the Bison. He appointed Ryan Aldridge as the head coach of the team, signalling the end of Doug Shepherd's reign. Shepherd went on to join rivals Sheffield Steelers.

Following financial problems, which had resulted in the departure of a number of players (including starting netminder Stevie Lyle), Taylor relinquished ownership of the Bison and the team's new owner was announced as Tomas Enerston by Planet Ice on 8 November 2007. Less than a year later, following further financial difficulty, Planet Ice put together a rescue package to keep Bison on the ice until the end of the 2008/09 season.

On 25 March 2009, the Bison released a statement confirming that they would be joining the EPL for the 2009/10 season. Entry to the EPIHL was confirmed on 15 April 2009, and Steve Moria took over as head coach the following day.

After Moria's departure at the end of the 2011–2012 season, it was announced that Doug Sheppard would return as the Bison head coach for the 2012–2013 season. In March 2013, Sheppard signed another deal with the Basingstoke Bison to continue as head coach for the 2013–2014 season.

The Basingstoke Bison won the 15/16 English Premier League title, under Doug Sheppard as coach. This ended their silverware drought of 23 years.

The 2017/18 season was arguably the Bison's greatest ever season. Remaining under Doug Sheppard, they secured a historic treble by winning the NIHL 1 South league, NIHL 1 South playoffs and finally the NIHL Final Four playoffs.

In 2018/19, the Bison had a major squad rebuild, with just 7 players remaining at the club from the previous season. With Doug Sheppard joining rivals Bracknell Bees, the Bison brought in British ice hockey veteran Ashley Tait as a player-coach. With Coventry Blaze legend Russell Cowley and imports Richard Bordowski and Michal Klejna, the Bison achieved an unlikely 3rd place finish in the league, and made their way to the cup final, which they lost to the Peterborough Phantoms.

Basingstoke announced they would sit out the 2023/24 NIHL season due to rink upgrade works.

After a two-year hiatus, Basingstoke announced their return to play for the 2025/26 NIHL season under new ownership Steve Nell & Rob Firmin.

== Club roster 2025-26 ==
Netminders
No.	Nat.	Player	Catches	Date of birth
33	(England)	Oscar Minton	R	25/04/2009
42	(Canada)	Max Wright	L	13/02/1999
45	(England)	Dean Skinns	L	03/10/1984

Defencemen
No.	Nat.	Player	Shoots	Date of birth	Hometown
13	(Canada)	Zach Shankar	L	28/01/1997	Ontario, Canada
15	(England)	Tyton Cathcart	Both	29/11/2003
17	(England)	Marcus Bradley	R	17/10/2007	Dayton, USA
51	(Scotland)	Reece Cochrane	L	23 April 2000 (age 26)	Kirkcaldy, Scotland
75	(England)	Brendan Baird	R	21/01/1996	Southampton, England
89	(England)	Thomas Relf	R	24/02/1998	Frimley, England
94	(England)	Stuart Mogg	R	01/08/1994	Basingstoke, England

Forwards
No.	Nat.	Player	Shoots	Date of birth	Hometown
4	(Wales)	Adam Harding	R	03/01/1993	Cardiff, Wales
8	(England)	William Stead	R	10/09/1998	Reading, England
9	(England)	Roman Cathcart	R	30/07/2006	Basingstoke, England
11	(England)	Hallam Willson	L	24/04/1998	Winchester, England
16	(England)	George Norcliffe	R	21/03/1994	Guildford, England
19	(England)	Adam Erskine	R	05/02/2010
21	(England)	Evan Nauth	L	28/08/2004
22	(Canada)	Brendan Sellan	L	23/01/2001
24	(England)	Zack Milton	L	10/05/2001	Ashford, England
29	(England)	Alex Sampford	R	29/10/1996	Basingstoke, England
74	(Scotland)	Liam Morris	L	07/04/1995	Glenrothes, Scotland
91	(England)	Oliver Hemmings-Maher	R	08/02/2002
93	(Canada)	Luke Spadafora	R	20/11/2000	Alberta, Canada

Team Staff
No.	Nat.	Name	Acquired	Role	Place of birth
	(Canada)	Jeff Flanagan	2025-26	Head coach/Director of Hockey Operations	Stratford, Canada
	(Scotland)	Tony Redmond		Coach	Scotland
	(Wales)	Dan Weller-Evans		Coach	Wales
	(England)	Gary Mitchell		Equipment manager	England

== Club roster 2022-23 ==
(*) Denotes a Non-British Trained player (Import)

Netminders
No.	Nat.	Player	Catches	Date of birth	Place of birth	Acquired	Contract
28	(England)	Alex Mettam	L	1 February 1988 (age 38)	Sheffield, England	2018 from Bracknell Bees	22/23
33	(England)	Jordan Lawday	L	28 August 1998 (age 28)	Basingstoke, England	2021 from Telford Tigers	22/23

Defencemen
No.	Nat.	Player	Shoots	Date of birth	Place of birth	Acquired	Contract
2	(England) (Canada)	Adam Jones	L	10 January 1996 (age 30)	Birmingham, England	2021 from Sheffield Steelers	22/23
13	(England)	Marcus Mitchell	R	1998 (age 24)	Guildford, England	2022 from Guildford Phoenix	22/23
44	(England)	Tom Banner	R	31 August 2002 (age 24)	Basingstoke, England	2021 from Basingstoke Buffalo	22/23
71	(England)	Josh Kelly	L	23 April 2000 (age 26)	Basingstoke, England	2022 from Bees IHC	22/23
75	(England)	Brendan Baird	R	21 January 1996 (age 30)	Southampton, England	2020 from Bracknell Bees	22/23
77	(Scotland)	Jay King	R	1 February 1996 (age 30)	Edinburgh, Scotland	2018 from Edinburgh Capitals	22/23

Forwards
No.	Nat.	Player	Shoots	Date of birth	Place of birth	Acquired	Contract
9	(Canada)	Gaël-Mukeba Lubwele*	R	25 April 1996 (age 30)	Montreal, QC, Canada	2022 from Nipissing University	22/23
11	(England)	Hallam Wilson	L	24 April 1998 (age 28)	Winchester, England	2017 from Oxford City Stars	22/23
16	(England)	George Norcliffe 'C'	R	21 March 1994 (age 32)	Guildford, England	2018 from Bracknell Bees	22/23
17	(Latvia)	Edgars Landsbergs		9 April 1999 (age 27)	Daugavpils, Latvia	2022 from MK Lightning	22/23
19	(England)	Paul Petts	R	21 January 1997 (age 29)	Gosport, England	2016 from Solent Devils	22/23
21	(Slovakia)	Marcel Balaz*	L	13 October 1988 (age 38)	Trebišov, Slovakia	2022 from Clermont	22/23
22	(England)	Roman Cathcart		2006 (age 16)	England	2022 from Basingstoke U18	22/23
23	(England)	Oliver Hemmings-Maher		2006 (age 16)	England	2022 from Basingstoke U18	22/23
24	(England)	Zack Milton 'A'	L	10 May 2001 (age 25)	England	2021 from Bracknell Bees	22/23
61	(England)	Ryan Sutton	L	17 March 1995 (age 31)	Basingstoke, England	2019 from Bracknell Bees	22/23
74	(Scotland) (Canada)	Liam Morris 'A'	L	7 April 1995 (age 31)	Glenrothes, Scotland	2018 from Northern Federals	22/23
88	(Poland)	Adrian Dusznik	L	26 December 2000 (age 25)		2022 from Guildford Phoenix	22/23
91	(England)	Aidan Doughty	L	12 July 1995 (age 31)	Isle of Wight, England	2020 from Bracknell Bees	22/23

Team Staff
No.	Nat.	Name	Acquired	Role	Place of birth	Joined from
	(Canada)	Jeff Flanagan	2025-26	Head coach/Director of Hockey Operations	Stratford, Canada	Guelph Gryphons, U Sports
	(England)	Gary Mitchell	2017-18	Equipment Manager	England
	(England)	Tony Skinns	2002-03	Equipment Manager	England
	(England)	Nikki Duffin	2022-23	Physical Therapist	England

== 2021/22 Outgoing ==
Outgoing
No.	Nat.	Player	Shoots	Date of birth	Place of birth	Leaving For
4	(Wales)	Adam Harding	R	3 January 1993 (age 33)	Cardiff, Wales	Bristol Pitbulls, NIHL
6	(England)	Ollie Stone	L	26 July 1998 (age 28)	Swindon, England	Swindon Wildcats, NIHL
13	(England)	Elliott Dewey	R	10 March 1997 (age 29)	Basingstoke, England	Raiders IHC, NIHL
21	(England) (Canada)	Ash Tait	R	9 August 1975 (age 51)	Toronto, ON, Canada	Retired
93	(Wales)	Dan Weller-Evans	L	25 October 1993 (age 33)	Bridgend, Wales	Bees IHC, NIHL
94	(Canada)	Alex Roberts	R	10 July 1994 (age 32)	Burnaby, BC, Canada	Bristol Pitbulls, NIHL

== Honoured members ==
Basingstoke have only retired the number of two players, the first being Kevin Conway's number 10 in 2005 following his initial retirement from ice hockey. In the 2005–06 season, Tony Redmond was honoured with a testimonial season. In September 2009, it was announced that Don Yewchin, the original ice hockey coordinator for the Beavers in 1988 would have his number 12 jersey retired before Basingstoke's league game with local rivals Bracknell Bees on Saturday 10 October 2009. In a fantastic twist of fate, Basingstoke won the game 12–0. In 2016, Tony Redmond's number 20 shirt was retired when the club beat Telford Tigers 7-0. In 2018, the club held a testimonial match to celebrate Kurt Reynolds, as he took a time-out from hockey.

== Team honours ==
1989/90

- Champions – English Div 1 Promotion Play-offs

1991/92

- Winners – Southern Cup

1992/93

- Champions – Heineken Division One
- Champions – Heineken Div 1 Promotion Play-offs
- Runners-up – Southern Cup

1993/94

- Runners-up – Southern Cup

1994/95

- Runners-up – Southern Cup

1998/99

- Runners-up – British National Ice Hockey League
- Runners-up – Christmas Cup

1999/00

- Winners – B & H Plate
- Runners-up – ntl: Christmas Cup
- Runners-up – BNL Play-off Championships

2000/01

- Winners – B & H Plate
- Runners-up – Findus British National Ice Hockey League
- Runners-up – FBNL Play-off Championships

2003/04

- EIHL First Team All Star – Curtis Cruickshank

2012/13

- Runners-up – English Premier Ice Hockey League

2013/14

- Winners – English Premier Ice Hockey League Cup
- Runners-up – English Premier Ice Hockey League
- Winners – English Premier Ice Hockey League Play-off Championship

2015/16

- Champions – English Premier Ice Hockey League

2017/18

- Champions – NIHL Britton League Division 1
- Champions - NIHL Britton League Play-Offs
- Champions - NIHL National Final Four Play-Offs

== Past head coaches ==
- Ashley Tait – 2018 – 2022 – Player / head coach
- Doug Sheppard – 2012 – 2018 – Player / head coach
- Steve Moria – 2009–2012 – Player / head coach
- Ryan Aldridge – 2007–2009 – Player / head coach
- Doug Sheppard – 2006–2007 – Player / head coach
- Mark Bernard – 2004–2006 – Player / head coach / general manager
- Steve Moria – 2002–2004 – Player / head coach
- Charlie Colon – 2000–2002 – Head coach
- Rick Strachan – 1999–2000 – Player / head coach
- Don Depoe – 1998–1999 – Head coach

== Notable players ==
- Darcy Anderson
- Derek Campbell
- Brad Cruikshank
- Mark DeSantis
- Jason Goulet
- Jason Hewitt
- Wes Jarvis
- David Kozier
- Dean Melanson
- Dwight Parrish
- Jayme Platt
- Brent Pope
- Steve Thornton
- David Vychodil
- Ben Davies
