= 1999–2000 WCHL season =

The 1999-00 West Coast Hockey League season was the fifth season of the West Coast Hockey League, a North American minor professional league. Eight teams participated in the regular season, and the Phoenix Mustangs were the league champions.

== Teams ==
1999-2000 West Coast Hockey League
Division	Team	City	Arena
North	Anchorage Aces	Anchorage, Alaska	Sullivan Arena
North	Colorado Gold Kings	Colorado Springs, Colorado	Colorado Springs World Arena
North	Idaho Steelheads	Boise, Idaho	Bank of America Centre
North	Tacoma Sabercats	Tacoma, Washington	Tacoma Dome
South	Bakersfield Condors	Bakersfield, California	Centennial Garden
South	Fresno Falcons	Fresno, California	Selland Arena
South	Phoenix Mustangs	Phoenix, Arizona	Arizona Veterans Memorial Coliseum
South	San Diego Gulls	San Diego, California	San Diego Sports Arena

=== Map of teams ===
North Division South Division

== Regular season ==
Northern Division	GP	W	L	OTL	GF	GA	Pts
Tacoma Sabercats	72	51	12	9	297	193	111
Colorado Gold Kings	72	37	31	4	264	276	78
Anchorage Aces	74	31	34	9	272	334	71
Idaho Steelheads	72	31	36	5	287	300	67

Southern Division	GP	W	L	OTL	GF	GA	Pts
San Diego Gulls	70	46	16	8	297	221	100
Bakersfield Condors	72	34	29	9	244	272	77
Phoenix Mustangs	72	31	35	6	264	284	68
Fresno Falcons	72	27	38	7	262	307	61

== Taylor Cup-Playoffs ==
Taylor Cup-Quarterfinals
N1	Tacoma Sabercats	3
N4	Idaho Steelheads	0
N2	Colorado Gold Kings	3
N3	Anchorage Aces	1
S1	San Diego Gulls	3
S4	Fresno Falcons	2
S2	Bakersfield Condors	1
S3	Phoenix Mustangs	3

Taylor Cup-Semifinals
N1	Tacoma Sabercats	3
N2	Colorado Gold Kings	0
S1	San Diego Gulls	1
S3	Phoenix Mustangs	3

Taylor Cup-Final
N1	Tacoma Sabercats	0
S3	Phoenix Mustangs	4
