= Pat Bingham =

Canadian ice hockey player and coach

- Born: October 8, 1968 (age 57) Vancouver, British Columbia, Canada
- Height: 6 ft 2 in (188 cm)
- Weight: 210 lb (95 kg; 15 st 0 lb)
- Position: Defence
- Shot: Right
- Played for: AHL; Binghamton Whalers; ECHL; Nashville Knights; Hampton Roads Admirals; Richmond Renegades; CoHL; Brantford Smoke; SuHL; Lakeland Ice Warriors; Jacksonville Bullets; SHL; Lakeland Prowlers
- NHL draft: Undrafted
- Playing career: 1989–1996

Pat Bingham (born October 8, 1968) is a Canadian former professional ice hockey defenceman. He is currently the president of the Colorado Rampage in the Midwest Elite Hockey League.

Bingham retired as a player in 1996 following a seven-year professional career that included time in the American Hockey League, ECHL, Colonial Hockey League, Sunshine Hockey League, and Southern Hockey League.

Bingham first head coaching position was during the 1999–2000 season with the Huntsville Channel Cats of the Central Hockey League. He has since gained head coaching experience in the United Hockey League, ECHL, and American Hockey League. In the ECHL he won the John Brophy Award as the Coach of the Year for stearing the Wheeling Nailers to a 51-17-4 record during the 2003–04 season.

On September 8, 2012, Bingham announced he was retiring as head coach of the ECHL's Elmira Jackals, and he was introduced as the new head coach for the Colorado Rampage of the U16 AAA Midwest Elite Hockey League.

== Career statistics ==
			Regular season					Playoffs
Season	Team	League	GP	G	A	Pts	PIM	GP	G	A	Pts	PIM
1985–86	Kamloops Blazers	WHL	44	4	3	7	43	1	0	0	0	4
1986–87	New Westminster Bruins	WHL	70	23	14	37	148	—	—	—	—	—
1987–88	New Westminster Bruins	WHL	55	19	20	39	115	—	—	—	—	—
1988–89	Kamloops Blazers	WHL	48	16	18	34	85	16	2	6	8	35
1989–90	Binghamton Whalers	AHL	24	3	4	7	63	—	—	—	—	—
1989–90	Nashville Knights	ECHL	39	7	30	37	175	—	—	—	—	—
1990–91	Nashville Knights	ECHL	30	8	11	19	140	—	—	—	—	—
1990–91	Hampton Roads Admirals	ECHL	12	6	7	13	38	14	6	9	15	69
1991–92	Hampton Roads Admirals	ECHL	5	0	2	2	56	—	—	—	—	—
1991–92	Richmond Renegades	ECHL	47	10	14	24	148	6	2	2	4	71
1992–93	Brantford Smoke	CoHL	14	0	4	4	26	—	—	—	—	—
1992–93	Richmond Renegades	ECHL	10	5	4	9	35	—	—	—	—	—
1993–94	Lakeland Ice Warriors	SuHL	33	3	21	24	101	—	—	—	—	—
1994–95	Lakeland Ice Warriors	SuHL	28	5	22	27	60	—	—	—	—	—
1994–95	Jacksonville Bullets	SuHL	21	1	12	13	46	4	1	2	3	12
1995–96	Lakeland Prowlers	SHL-Sr.	52	5	20	25	116	5	1	2	3	2
ECHL totals			143	36	68	104	592	20	8	11	19	140

== Awards and honours ==
Award	Year
John Brophy Award – ECHL Coach of the Year	2003–04
