= Pasi Schalin =

Finnish ice hockey player

- Born: 8 February 1968 (age 58) Imatra, Finland
- Height: 5 ft 10 in (178 cm)
- Weight: 168 lb (76 kg; 12 st 0 lb)
- Position: Forward
- Played for: Maine Mariners; HIFK
- NHL draft: Undrafted
- Playing career: 1986–1997

Pasi Schalin (born 8 February 1968) is a Finnish actor, fitness model, personal trainer, retired professional ice hockey player and roller derby skater. He is best remembered as a key skater on TV's RollerJam known as "The Schalin Machine".

== Career ==
Born near Helsinki, Finland, Pasi played professional hockey with several teams in Finland, Germany, the United States and Canada. He was a part of the National Hockey League's Edmonton Oilers organization. Upon retirement, he and then-wife Suzanne moved to the U.S. and both landed spots on The Nashville Network/The New TNN's roller derby revival RollerJam. Both skated for the Florida Sundogs the first two seasons, then the California Quakes the final two.

After RollerJam ended in 2001, Pasi began focusing on his acting and modeling careers. He currently resides in Los Angeles and has appeared in several television shows and movies.

== Career statistics ==
			Regular season					Playoffs
Season	Team	League	GP	G	A	Pts	PIM	GP	G	A	Pts	PIM
1986–87	Imatran Ketterä	I-Divisioona	2	0	0	0	0	—	—	—	—	—
1988–89	ESC Wedemark	Germany3	17	29	23	52	12	—	—	—	—	—
1990–91	Vantaa HT	I-Divisioona	30	5	2	7	4	—	—	—	—	—
1991–92	Maine Mariners	AHL	5	0	0	0	0	—	—	—	—	—
1992–93	HJK	I-Divisioona	13	8	6	14	6	—	—	—	—	—
1992–93	Junkkarit HT	I-Divisioona	28	10	10	20	12	—	—	—	—	—
1993–94	Nashville Knights	ECHL	4	0	2	2	0	—	—	—	—	—
1993–94	West Palm Beach Blaze	SuHL	22	6	8	14	6	—	—	—	—	—
1993–94	Daytona Beach Sun Devils	SuHL	29	21	19	40	29	—	—	—	—	—
1994–95	Daytona Beach Sun Devils	SuHL	15	7	13	20	6	—	—	—	—	—
1994–95	HIFK Hockey	SM-liiga	2	0	0	0	2	—	—	—	—	—
1994–95	Karhu-Kissat	I-Divisioona	21	8	11	19	12	—	—	—	—	—
1994–95	ESC Wedemark	Germany2	4	2	0	2	4	3	0	2	2	4
1995–96	Kaufbeurer Adler	DEL	7	0	2	2	4	3	0	2	2	2
1995–96	EHC Salzgitter	Germany2	6	7	1	8	24	—	—	—	—	—
1996–97	Alaska Gold Kings	WCHL	4	2	0	2	7	—	—	—	—	—
1996–97	San Diego Gulls	WCHL	38	14	18	32	6	—	—	—	—	—
AHL totals			5	0	0	0	0	—	—	—	—	—
I-divisioona totals			94	31	29	60	34	—	—	—	—	—
