= John Blum =

American ice hockey player (born 1959)

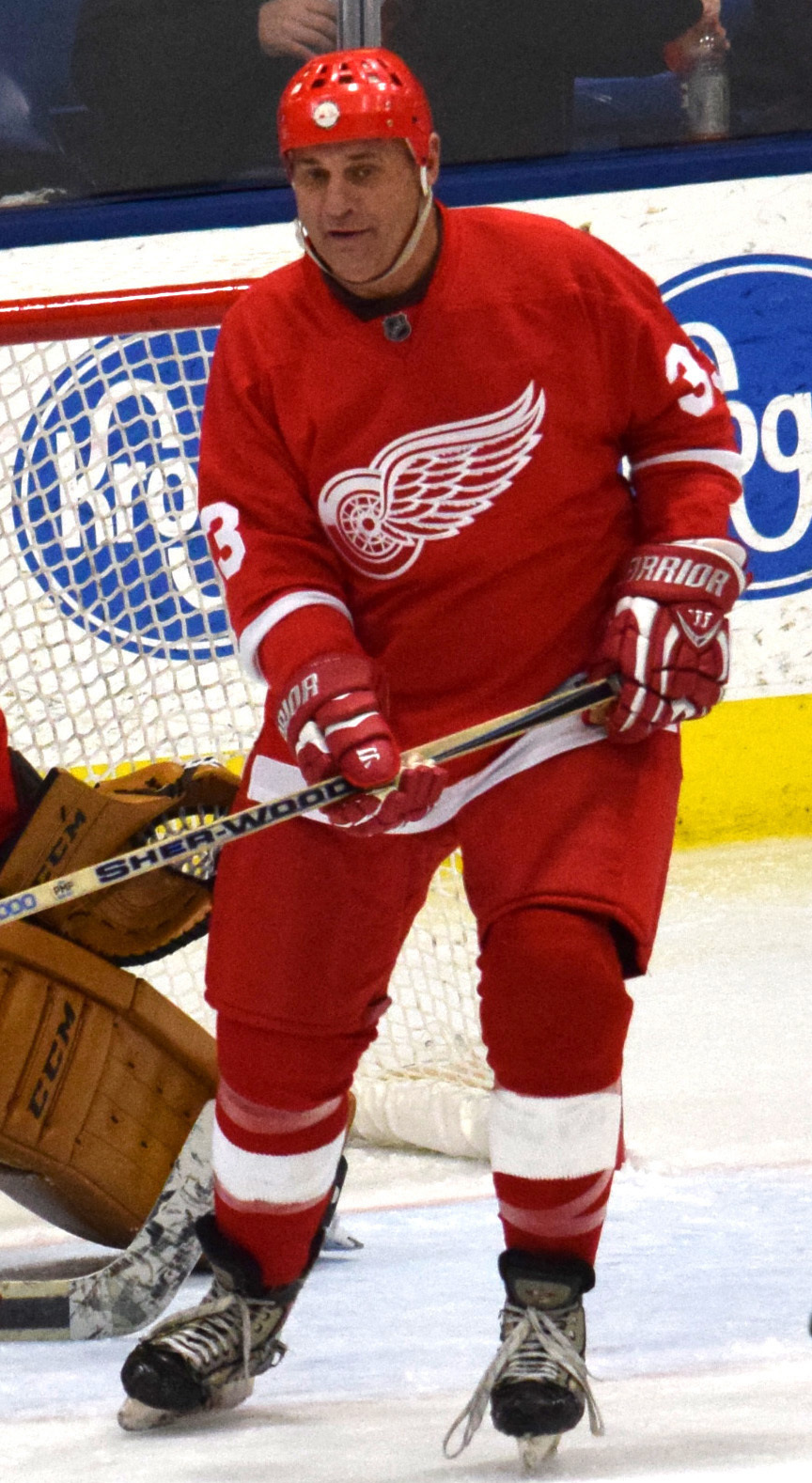
- Blum in 2016
- Born: September 8, 1959 (age 66) Detroit, Michigan, U.S.
- Height: 6 ft 3 in (191 cm)
- Weight: 205 lb (93 kg; 14 st 9 lb)
- Position: Defense
- Shot: Right
- Played for: Edmonton Oilers; Boston Bruins; Washington Capitals; Detroit Red Wings
- NHL draft: Undrafted
- Playing career: 1981–1995

John Joseph Blum (born September 8, 1959) is an American former professional ice hockey defenseman. He played in the National Hockey League with the Edmonton Oilers, Boston Bruins, Washington Capitals, and Detroit Red Wings between 1982 and 1990. He also spent considerable time in the minor American Hockey League, and retired in 1995.

== Playing career ==
Blum was born in Detroit, Michigan. He is a graduate of Notre Dame High School in Harper Woods, Michigan. His high school hockey teammates were comedian Dave Coulier and other well known players and personalities. Blum played both high school and college hockey under head coach John Giordano.

Signed as an undrafted free agent by the Edmonton Oilers in 1981, Blum played mostly in the minors before being traded to the Boston Bruins, a team that he would play for three different times during his career. He also played for the Washington Capitals and Detroit Red Wings.

Blum scored in first NHL goal on April 1, 1984—in the last game of Boston's 1983-84 schedule—during his team's 3-1 victory over the New Jersey Devils. It was the game-winning goal.

== Post-playing career ==
Blum would later serve as an assistant coach in the minor leagues for the Detroit Falcons, Saginaw Lumber Kings, Detroit Vipers, Toledo Storm, and Motor City Mechanics.

He is also a new addition to the Detroit Red Wings Alumni Team and a former employee at De La Salle Collegiate High School in Warren, MI.

== Career statistics ==
=== Regular season and playoffs ===
			Regular season					Playoffs
Season	Team	League	GP	G	A	Pts	PIM	GP	G	A	Pts	PIM
1976–77	Harper Woods High School	HS-MI	—	—	—	—	—	—	—	—	—	—
1977–78	University of Michigan	B-10	7	0	0	0	4	—	—	—	—	—
1978–79	University of Michigan	B-10	35	1	11	12	87	—	—	—	—	—
1979–80	University of Michigan	B-10	37	9	41	50	79	—	—	—	—	—
1980–81	University of Michigan	B-10	38	9	43	52	93	—	—	—	—	—
1981–82	Wichita Wind	CHL	78	8	33	41	247	7	0	3	3	24
1982–83	Edmonton Oilers	NHL	5	0	3	3	24	—	—	—	—	—
1982–83	Moncton Alpines	AHL	76	10	30	40	219	—	—	—	—	—
1983–84	Edmonton Oilers	NHL	4	0	1	1	2	—	—	—	—	—
1983–84	Moncton Alpines	AHL	57	3	22	25	202	—	—	—	—	—
1983–84	Boston Bruins	NHL	12	1	1	2	30	3	0	0	0	4
1984–85	Boston Bruins	NHL	75	3	13	16	263	5	0	0	0	13
1985–86	Boston Bruins	NHL	61	1	7	8	80	3	0	0	0	6
1985–86	Moncton Golden Flames	AHL	12	1	5	6	37	—	—	—	—	—
1986–87	Washington Capitals	NHL	66	2	8	10	133	6	0	1	1	4
1987–88	Boston Bruins	NHL	19	0	1	1	70	3	0	1	1	0
1987–88	Maine Mariners	AHL	43	5	18	23	136	8	0	6	6	35
1988–89	Detroit Red Wings	NHL	6	0	0	0	8	—	—	—	—	—
1988–89	Adirondack Red Wings	AHL	56	1	19	20	168	12	0	1	1	18
1989–90	Boston Bruins	NHL	2	0	0	0	0	—	—	—	—	—
1989–90	Maine Mariners	AHL	77	1	20	21	134	—	—	—	—	—
1990–91	Maine Mariners	AHL	57	4	8	12	75	1	0	0	0	2
1991–92	Capital District Islanders	AHL	51	0	6	6	76	1	0	0	0	2
1993–94	Daytona Beach Sun Devils	SuHL	12	0	2	2	67	—	—	—	—	—
1994–95	Detroit Falcons	CoHL	71	1	14	15	98	12	0	2	2	20
AHL totals			429	25	128	153	1047	22	0	7	7	57
NHL totals			250	7	34	41	610	20	0	2	2	27

== Awards and honors ==
Award	Year
All-WCHA Second Team	1980–81
