= Craig Johnson (ice hockey, born 1972) =

American ice hockey player (born 1972)

- Born: March 18, 1972 (age 54) Saint Paul, Minnesota, U.S.
- Height: 6 ft 3 in (191 cm)
- Weight: 198 lb (90 kg; 14 st 2 lb)
- Position: Left wing
- Shot: Left
- Played for: St. Louis Blues; Los Angeles Kings; Toronto Maple Leafs; Washington Capitals; Mighty Ducks of Anaheim; Hamburg Freezers; DEG Metro Stars; EC Red Bull Salzburg
- National team: United States
- NHL draft: 33rd overall, 1990; St. Louis Blues
- Playing career: 1994–2008

Craig Thomas Johnson (born March 18, 1972) is an American ice hockey player who played 10 seasons in the National Hockey League (NHL). He was drafted 33rd overall by the St. Louis Blues in the 1990 NHL entry draft and went on to play 557 games in the NHL for the St. Louis Blues, Los Angeles Kings, Toronto Maple Leafs, Washington Capitals and the Mighty Ducks of Anaheim.

Internationally Johnson played for the American national team in several World Championships and the 1994 Winter Olympics.

== Playing career ==
Johnson made his NHL debut during the 1994–95 season with St. Louis. He scored the first goal at the Kiel Center when it opened in 1995. On February 27, 1996, Johnson was traded with Patrice Tardif, Roman Vopat, and two draft picks to the Los Angeles Kings for Wayne Gretzky. He remained a King for another seven seasons through the 2002–03 season. During his tenure with the Kings, he wore number 23, making him the penultimate player to wear the number until it was retired for Dustin Brown in 2023.

He signed as a free agent with the Anaheim Mighty Ducks for the 2003–04 season. He spent half a season with Anaheim until being claimed off waivers by the Toronto Maple Leafs. Two months later, he was again claimed off waivers by the Washington Capitals, where he finished the season.

Johnson moved to Germany's Deutsche Eishockey Liga (DEL), signing with the Hamburg Freezers. After one season he signed with the DEG Metro Stars in Düsseldorf where he spent two seasons. In 2007, Johnson moved to Austria and signed with Red Bull Salzberg.

Johnson returned to the Orange County area and coached youth hockey at Santa Margarita Catholic High School and for the Anaheim Jr Ducks youth team. He was an assistant coach for the Ontario Reign in 2010–11 and joined the player development staff for the Los Angeles Kings in 2018. He returned to the Reign, now in the AHL, as assistant coach in 2020. He is working as co-head coach of the Reign with Chris Hajt.

== Personal life ==
His son Ryan, a defenseman, was drafted in the first round by the Buffalo Sabres in the 2019 NHL Draft - he is currently a member of the Buffalo Sabres

== Career statistics ==
=== Regular season and playoffs ===
			Regular season					Playoffs
Season	Team	League	GP	G	A	Pts	PIM	GP	G	A	Pts	PIM
1987–88	Hill-Murray School	HS-MN	28	14	20	34	4	—	—	—	—	—
1988–89	Hill-Murray School	HS-MN	24	22	30	52	10	—	—	—	—	—
1989–90	Hill-Murray School	HS-MN	23	15	36	51	0	—	—	—	—	—
1990–91	University of Minnesota	WCHA	33	13	18	31	34	—	—	—	—	—
1991–92	University of Minnesota	WCHA	44	19	39	58	70	—	—	—	—	—
1992–93	University of Minnesota	WCHA	42	22	24	46	68	—	—	—	—	—
1992–93	Jacksonville Bullets	SuHL	23	2	9	11	38	—	—	—	—	—
1993–94	United States National Team	Intl	54	25	26	51	64	—	—	—	—	—
1994–95	Peoria Rivermen	IHL	16	2	6	8	25	9	0	4	4	10
1994–95	St. Louis Blues	NHL	15	3	3	6	6	1	0	0	0	2
1995–96	Worcester IceCats	AHL	5	3	0	3	2	—	—	—	—	—
1995–96	St. Louis Blues	NHL	49	8	7	15	30	—	—	—	—	—
1995–96	Los Angeles Kings	NHL	11	5	4	9	6	—	—	—	—	—
1996–97	Los Angeles Kings	NHL	31	4	3	7	26	—	—	—	—	—
1997–98	Los Angeles Kings	NHL	74	17	21	38	42	4	1	0	1	4
1998–99	Los Angeles Kings	NHL	69	7	12	19	32	—	—	—	—	—
1999–00	Los Angeles Kings	NHL	76	9	14	23	28	4	1	0	1	2
2000–01	Los Angeles Kings	NHL	26	4	5	9	16	—	—	—	—	—
2001–02	Los Angeles Kings	NHL	72	13	14	27	24	7	1	2	3	2
2002–03	Los Angeles Kings	NHL	70	3	6	9	22	—	—	—	—	—
2003–04	Mighty Ducks of Anaheim	NHL	39	1	2	3	14	—	—	—	—	—
2003–04	Toronto Maple Leafs	NHL	10	1	1	2	6	—	—	—	—	—
2003–04	Washington Capitals	NHL	15	0	6	6	8	—	—	—	—	—
2004–05	Hamburg Freezers	DEL	42	19	25	44	56	—	—	—	—	—
2005–06	DEG Metro Stars	DEL	25	11	2	13	48	13	8	5	13	40
2006–07	DEG Metro Stars	DEL	50	19	19	38	83	9	3	2	5	20
2007–08	EC Salzburg	AUT	23	3	6	9	30	14	2	5	7	32
NHL totals			557	75	98	173	260	16	3	2	5	10

=== International ===
Year	Team	Event	GP	G	A	Pts	PIM
1991	United States	WJC	2	0	2	2	0
1993	United States	WC	6	1	1	2	4
1994	United States	OLY	8	0	4	4	4
1996	United States	WC	6	1	1	2	2
1999	United States	WC	6	0	3	3	0
2003	United States	WC	6	2	2	4	8
Junior totals			2	0	2	2	0
Senior totals			32	4	11	15	18

== Awards and honors ==
Award	Year(s)
All-WCHA Rookie Team	1990–91
WCHA All-Tournament Team	1992, 1993
