= Doug Keans =

Canadian ice hockey player

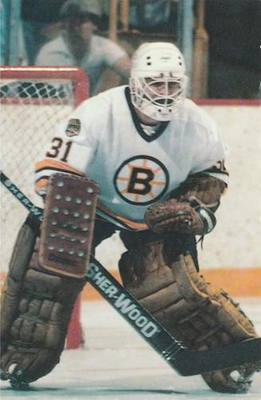
- Born: January 7, 1958 (age 68) Pembroke, Ontario, Canada
- Height: 5 ft 7 in (170 cm)
- Weight: 185 lb (84 kg; 13 st 3 lb)
- Position: Goaltender
- Caught: Left
- Played for: Los Angeles Kings; Boston Bruins
- NHL draft: 94th overall, 1978; Los Angeles Kings
- Playing career: 1978–1989

Douglas Frederick Keans (born January 7, 1958) is a Canadian former professional ice hockey goaltender who played nine seasons in the National Hockey League with the Los Angeles Kings and Boston Bruins between 1980 and 1988.

== Playing career ==
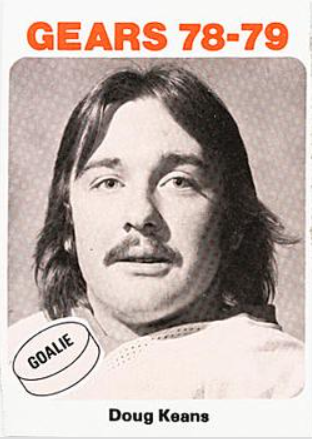
Keans in 1978-79 card for Saginaw Gears of the IHL

In his youth, he played in the 1970 and 1971 Quebec International Pee-Wee Hockey Tournament with a minor ice hockey team from Barrie.

Following a solid junior career with the Oshawa Generals, Keans was selected in the 6th round (94th overall) of the 1978 NHL entry draft by the Los Angeles Kings. He made his debut in the 1979–80 season, posting a stellar 2.47 goals-against average in 10 games. Keans spent parts of four seasons with the Kings, but was inconsistent and never fully established himself, serving as one of several backups to incumbent starter Mario Lessard. His best season was 1981–82, when he posted an 8–10–7 record and 4.30 GAA in 31 appearances.

Keans was claimed off waivers by the Boston Bruins prior to the 1983–84 season to back up starter Pete Peeters. In Boston, he finally settled down and played consistent hockey, establishing himself as one of the better backup goaltenders in the NHL. In his first season as a Bruin, he posted a 19–8–3 record with an excellent 3.10 GAA as well as his first two career shutouts.

While Boston cycled through starting goalies during the mid-1980s, Keans was a fixture as the backup, routinely outplaying the starter. He spent 5 seasons in Boston, backing up Peeters, Pat Riggin, Bill Ranford and Réjean Lemelin. During this period he never won fewer than 14 games in a season, never finished with a record below .500, and compiled a stellar 84–46–13 record. Despite his solid performances, however, he was considered too small at 5'7" to be relied upon as a #1 netminder.

At the trade deadline near the end of the 1987–88 season, Boston acquired star netminder Andy Moog from the Edmonton Oilers. Lemelin was now the backup, and Keans was relegated to the #3 position and sent to the minors. He spent another season in the minors before retiring in 1989, although he would come out of retirement for two brief stints in low-end minor pro during the 1990s.

Keans finished his nine-year NHL career with a record of 96–64–26 with a 3.50 GAA in 210 career appearances, along with four shutouts.

== Career statistics ==
=== Regular season and playoffs ===
			Regular season									Playoffs
Season	Team	League	GP	W	L	T	MIN	GA	SO	GAA	SV%	GP	W	L	T	MIN	GA	SO	GAA	SV%
1975–76	Oshawa Legionaires	MJBHL	—	—	—	—	—	—	—	—	—	—	—	—	—	—	—	—	—	—
1975–76	Oshawa Generals	OMJHL	1	0	0	0	29	4	0	8.28	—	—	—	—	—	—	—	—	—	—
1976–77	Oshawa Generals	OMJHL	48	—	—	—	2632	291	0	6.63	—	—	—	—	—	—	—	—	—	—
1977–78	Oshawa Generals	OMJHL	42	—	—	—	2500	172	1	4.13	—	5	1	3	1	299	23	0	4.63	—
1978–79	Saginaw Gears	IHL	59	—	—	—	3207	217	0	4.06	—	2	—	—	—	120	10	0	5.05	—
1979–80	Los Angeles Kings	NHL	10	3	3	3	556	23	0	2.48	.907	1	0	1	—	40	7	0	10.50	.650
1979–80	Binghamton Dusters	AHL	7	3	3	2	429	25	0	3.50	.874	—	—	—	—	—	—	—	—	—
1979–80	Saginaw Gears	IHL	22	—	—	—	1070	67	1	3.76	—	—	—	—	—	—	—	—	—	—
1980–81	Los Angeles Kings	NHL	9	2	3	1	454	37	0	4.89	.837	—	—	—	—	—	—	—	—	—
1980–81	Houston Apollos	CHL	11	3	4	4	699	27	0	2.32	.912	—	—	—	—	—	—	—	—	—
1980–81	Oklahoma City Stars	CHL	9	3	5	0	492	32	1	3.90	.883	—	—	—	—	—	—	—	—	—
1981–82	Los Angeles Kings	NHL	31	8	10	7	1431	103	0	4.32	.864	2	0	1	—	31	1	0	1.96	.800
1981–82	New Haven Nighthawks	AHL	13	5	5	1	686	33	2	2.89	.901	—	—	—	—	—	—	—	—	—
1982–83	Los Angeles Kings	NHL	6	0	2	2	304	24	0	4.73	.826	—	—	—	—	—	—	—	—	—
1982–83	New Haven Nighthawks	AHL	30	13	13	2	1724	125	0	4.35	.864	—	—	—	—	—	—	—	—	—
1983–84	Boston Bruins	NHL	33	19	8	3	1777	92	2	3.11	.883	—	—	—	—	—	—	—	—	—
1984–85	Boston Bruins	NHL	25	16	6	3	1496	82	1	3.29	.877	4	2	2	—	238	15	0	3.78	.864
1985–86	Boston Bruins	NHL	30	14	13	3	1754	107	0	3.66	.863	—	—	—	—	—	—	—	—	—
1986–87	Boston Bruins	NHL	36	18	8	4	1942	108	0	3.34	.881	2	0	2	—	238	15	0	3.78	.864
1987–88	Boston Bruins	NHL	30	16	11	0	1658	90	1	3.26	.880	—	—	—	—	—	—	—	—	—
1987–88	Maine Mariners	AHL	10	8	2	0	600	34	0	3.40	.881	10	5	5	—	617	42	0	4.08	.868
1988–89	Baltimore Skipjacks	AHL	4	1	3	0	239	17	0	4.27	.847	—	—	—	—	—	—	—	—	—
1988–89	Springfield Indians	AHL	32	11	16	2	1737	124	0	4.28	.854	—	—	—	—	—	—	—	—	—
1992–93	Minnesota Iron Rangers	AmHA	8	2	6	0	481	39	0	4.86	.870	—	—	—	—	—	—	—	—	—
1992–93	Jacksonville Bullets	SunHL	15	8	5	0	801	53	1	3.97	.885	5	2	2	1	301	17	0	3.39	—
1995–96	Jacksonville Bullets	SHL	9	5	3	0	430	53	0	5.15	.854	—	—	—	—	—	—	—	—	—
NHL totals			210	96	64	26	11374	666	4	3.51	.874	9	2	6	—	428	34	0	4.77	.824
