= Wayne Groulx =

Canadian-born Austrian ice hockey player

- Born: February 2, 1965 (age 61) Welland, Ontario, Canada
- Height: 5 ft 9 in (175 cm)
- Weight: 178 lb (81 kg; 12 st 10 lb)
- Position: Centre
- Shot: Right
- Played for: Quebec Nordiques; KalPa; EHC Lustenau; ATSE Graz; EC Graz
- National team: Austria
- NHL draft: 172nd overall, 1983; Quebec Nordiques
- Playing career: 1985–1995

Wayne Groulx (born February 2, 1965) is a Canadian-born Austrian former ice hockey centre. During the 1984–85 NHL season, he played one game for the Quebec Nordiques.

Groulx was drafted 172nd overall by the Nordiques in the 1983 NHL entry draft and played one game for them during the 1984-85 NHL season. He also played in the International Hockey League for the Muskegon Lumberjacks and in the American Hockey League for the Fredericton Express and Baltimore Skipjacks. Groulx played in Finland's SM-liiga for KalPa before spending six seasons in Austria, with EHC Lustenau and five seasons with EC Graz. He represented Austria in the 1992 World Hockey Championship.

Despite three 100-point campaigns with the Ontario Hockey League's Sault Ste. Marie Greyhounds, including winning the Red Tilson Trophy as Most Outstanding Player in 1985, his success never translated beyond the junior level in North America, though he later became a star player in the Austrian Hockey League in the 1990s.

After retiring as a player, Groulx coached the Fort Erie Meteors of the Golden Horseshoe Junior Hockey League.

== Career statistics ==
=== Regular season and playoffs ===
			Regular season					Playoffs
Season	Team	League	GP	G	A	Pts	PIM	GP	G	A	Pts	PIM
1980–81	Welland Cougars	GHL	38	44	32	76	44	—	—	—	—	—
1981–82	Sault Ste. Marie Greyhounds	OHL	66	25	41	66	66	13	6	8	14	8
1982–83	Sault Ste. Marie Greyhounds	OHL	67	44	86	130	54	16	7	9	16	13
1983–84	Sault Ste. Marie Greyhounds	OHL	70	59	78	137	48	16	14	22	36	13
1984–85	Sault Ste. Marie Greyhounds	OHL	64	59	85	144	102	16	18	18	36	24
1984–85	Quebec Nordiques	NHL	1	0	0	0	0	—	—	—	—	—
1984–85	Sault Ste. Marie Greyhounds	M-Cup	—	—	—	—	—	4	2	2	4	7
1985–86	Fredericton Express	AHL	15	2	6	8	12	—	—	—	—	—
1985–86	Muskegon Lumberjacks	IHL	55	22	27	49	56	12	4	4	8	26
1986–87	Fredericton Express	AHL	30	11	7	18	8	—	—	—	—	—
1986–87	Muskegon Lumberjacks	IHL	38	18	22	40	49	—	—	—	—	—
1986–87	Canada	Intl.	9	3	4	7	8	—	—	—	—	—
1987–88	KalPa	SM-l	27	17	10	27	54	—	—	—	—	—
1987–88	Baltimore Skipjacks	AHL	5	5	0	5	15	—	—	—	—	—
1988–89	EHC Lustenau	AUT	40	40	47	87	—	—	—	—	—	—
1989–90	ATSE Graz	AUT	36	42	41	83	87	—	—	—	—	—
1990–91	ATSE Graz	AUT	32	26	22	48	85	—	—	—	—	—
1991–92	ATSE Graz	AUT	29	14	19	33	—	—	—	—	—	—
1992–93	EC Graz	AUT	55	64	38	102	—	—	—	—	—	—
1993–94	EC Graz	AUT	44	20	17	37	—	—	—	—	—	—
1994–95	Lakeland Ice Warriors	SuHL	13	7	12	19	22	—	—	—	—	—
IHL totals			93	40	49	89	105	12	4	4	8	26
AUT totals			236	206	184	390	—	—	—	—	—	—

=== International ===
Year	Team	Event	GP	G	A	Pts	PIM
1992	Austria	WC B	7	7	7	14	43
1993	Austria	WC	6	0	0	0	10

== See also ==
- List of players who played only one game in the NHL
