= Ocean Center =

Convention center and indoor arena in Daytona Beach, Florida, U.S.

Coordinates: 29.228700°N 81.010600°W

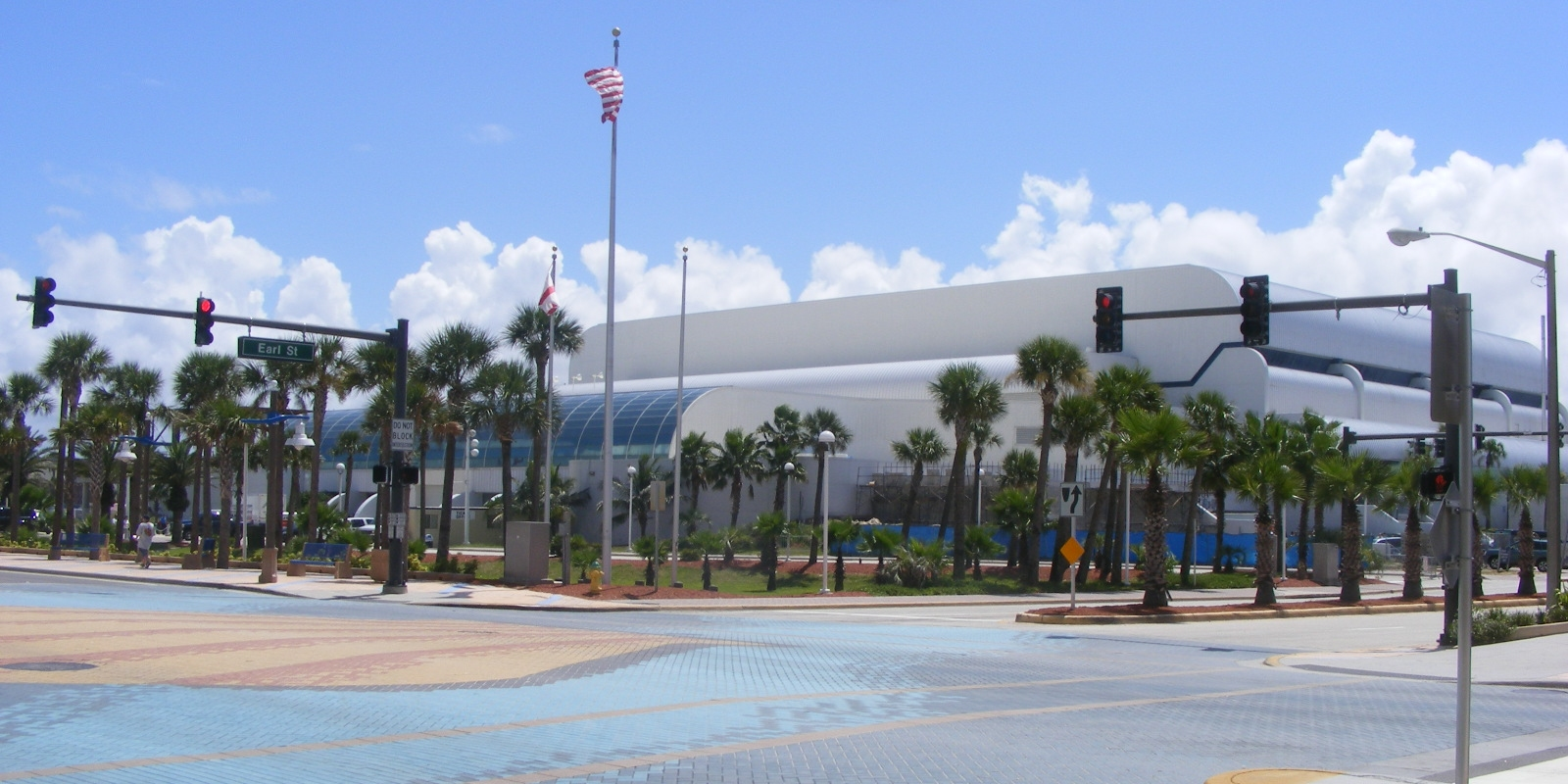
- Interactive map of Ocean Center
- Address: 101 N Atlantic Avenue
- Location: Daytona Beach, Florida, U.S.
- Operator: Volusia County Government

Construction
- Renovated: 2009
- Cost: $82 million (2009 renovations)

Tenants
- Daytona Beach Sun Devils/Breakers (SuHL/SHL) (1992–96); Daytona Beach Hawgs/Thunder/ThunderBirds (NIFL/AIFL/WIFL/af2) (2005–08)

Website
- oceancenter.com

Ocean Center is a convention center located in Daytona Beach, Florida. It opened in 1985 and is the fifth–largest convention center in Florida.

== Building and design ==
The Ocean Center features 205,000 square feet (19,000 m^{2}) of prime meeting space; 42,000 square feet (3,900 m^{2}) of exhibit space at the main arena, 14,000 square feet (1,300 m^{2}) of space in the Ballroom and 32,000 square feet (3,000 m^{2}) of meeting rooms. The new addition of the Exhibit Hall features 94,695 square feet (8,797.5 m^{2}), ceiling heights: 22 to 45 feet (14 m), a drive-in door: 20' x 16', and 6 loading docks with self-adjusting levelers. 100,000 square feet (9,300 m^{2}) of parking lot/outdoor exhibit space was also added near the Exhibit Hall.

Thanks to a $3 million grant from the ECHO program, the county's Ocean Center has a grand entrance. The grant from the ECHO grants-in-aid program was used to create a Cultural Information Center (CIC). The funds were used for site preparation and construction of the CIC, an enhancement of 51,635 square feet (4,797.0 m^{2}) of lobby space with gathering areas, restrooms and concession facilities. It displays works from the "Arts in Public Places" program and has dedicated areas for permanent and visiting art works and cultural displays from all areas of Volusia County. The grand entrance also includes a new façade and entrance along N. Atlantic Avenue. Other features of the new entrance lobby and CIC is a marquee mural on the west wall above the ballrooms doors, seen from inside and outside the facility. The mural will change with the center's exhibits. The center and its displays are in the highest pedestrian traffic area for the venue.

The main arena seats 6,176 for ice hockey and arena football, 8,362 for basketball, 7,184 for the circus, 7,380 for ice shows, 8,582 for wrestling and 9,440 for concerts. The Ocean Center is also used for banquets, trade shows, high school graduations, conventions and other events.

== History ==
In 1985, the Ocean Center opened with 60,000 square feet (5,600 m^{2}) of exhibit space and 18 breakout rooms. Christian pop singer Amy Grant performed the first concert at the Ocean Center on October 3, 1985, singing to 2,938 people. John Denver was the grand opening act two days later, performing to a crowd of 7,368.

== Notable events ==
The Ocean Center has presented The Harlem Globetrotters, the Royal Lipizzaner Stallions and Larry the Cable Guy, among other noted performance artists. Other entertainment events have included the former Ringling Brothers and Barnum & Bailey Circus, monster truck shows, Miss Teen USA Pageant and WWE Live. The fun, furry characters of Sesame Street have been frequent performers at the Ocean Center. Family productions had multiple shows in 1985-86, and returned in the 1990s and 2000s. In October 1997, the Ocean Center hosted the Nice n' Easy U.S. Figure Skating Classic. Skaters included Tara Lipinski, Michelle Kwan, Dorothy Hamill, Nicole Bobek, Rosalynn Summers, Kyoko Ina, Jason Dungjen, Todd Eldredge, Rudy Galindo, Michael Weiss, Elizabeth Punsalan and Jerod Swallow. The event was broadcast later on ABC. The Ocean Center also hosts The Passion Conferences starring Worship singer Chris Tomlin. As the Halifax area has become a separate market from Orlando in recent years, Ocean Center has hosted concerts by acts with ties to Florida, including Gloria Estefan, Tom Petty and the Heartbreakers, and, most recently, Pitbull (touring with Enrique Iglesias), Florida Georgia Line, Maroon 5 and Ariana Grande. It has also hosted acts such as Iron Maiden, AC/DC, Cheap Trick, and Faster Pussycat.

World Championship Wrestling (WCW) held their third annual Bash At The Beach pay-per-view at the Ocean Center in 1996 in which Hulk Hogan, notable as one of the largest fan favorites of all time, turned heel during the final moments of the show. This in turn created the New World Order (nWo) and was a catalyst for the Monday Night War.

Hulk Hogan turned heel once again in this arena, in Total Nonstop Action Wrestling (TNA)'s sixth annual Bound for Glory. He interfered in the main event and forming alliances with Eric Bischoff to help Jeff Hardy to win the TNA World Heavyweight Championship against Kurt Angle and Mr. Anderson, in turn forming Immortal, with Jeff Jarrett and Abyss.

From 2018 to 2024, the Community Effort Orlando eSports tournament was held at the arena.

On June 29, 2018, New Japan Pro-Wrestling (NJPW) held their CEO×NJPW: When Worlds Collide event as part of Community Effort Orlando. The event was livestreamed on Twitch.

On June 29, 2019, All Elite Wrestling (AEW) held their Fyter Fest event. This was the promotion’s second pay-per-view event.

=== Sports ===
The Ocean Center hosted the 1988 Trans-America Athletic Conference men's basketball tournament. It is also home to a few of Bethune-Cookman University basketball games. The Harlem Globetrotters have frequented the Ocean Center arena and the Land of Magic Basketball Tournament is held there. The National Cheerleader Association and the State Cheer and Dance Competition has been hosted by the Ocean Center for more than 20 years. Many Volleyball Competitions are held at the Ocean Center including the Daytona 100 Volleyball Competition and the Florida Volleyball Festival. Gymnastic Tournaments are played at the Ocean Center including Ace Gymnastics and Pan American Gymnastics.

In 2015 the Geico Endurocross series kicked off their championship during Daytona Bike Week. Cody Webb took the main event win.

Due to the COVID-19 pandemic, the Ocean Center hosted the entire 2021 College Basketball Invitational and the event returned in 2022, 2023, 2024 and 2025.

=== Ice hockey ===
The Daytona Beach Sun Devils of the defunct Sunshine Hockey League played hockey games at the Ocean Center from 1992 to 1995. In 1995, the team and league changed names to the Daytona Beach Breakers, playing in the Southern Hockey League. After the 1995-96 season both the team and the league folded.

=== Other events ===
- Daytona Beach Garden Show – Annual event, co-sponsored by the Council of Garden Clubs of the Halifax District and the Daytona Beach News-Journal; usually scheduled in March.
- Daytona Beach Home Show – Annual event, co-sponsored by the Pilot Club of Daytona Beach and the Daytona Beach News-Journal; usually scheduled in October.
- National Reptile Breeders Expo – An annual event that is held every 3rd week of August for three days. This event allows consumers to view and purchase reptiles in the convention center.
- National High School Drill Team Championships (http://nhsdtc.thenationals.net) – An event held since the building opened historically held the first weekend in May annually. This event brings together many of the finest high school Junior ROTC units performing military drill & ceremony events including military inspection, regulation drill, color guard and armed & unarmed individual and team exhibition drill. The event maintains active duty military judges and hosts roughly 4,000 people during the 3-day competition. The NHSDTC event uses every square inch of the Ocean Center Arena and Conference Center, as well as all of the breakout rooms throughout.
- National Youth Football Championships (http://football.thenationals.net) – An event held since the building opened historically held on the American Thanksgiving weekend annually. This event brings together youth football and cheerleading programs from across the eastern North America and the occasional overseas team. The event maintains NFL cheerleaders, a youth cheer competition, as well as an elaborate awards ceremony hosting roughly 2,500 people during the 4-day competition weekend.
- Florida Federation of Colorguards Circuit (http://ffcc.org/) – An annual championship for the state affiliation of Winter Guard International. Winter guard teams and indoor percussion ensembles perform at the Ocean Center in various divisions to compete for placement. The FFCC state championship is scheduled to remain at the Ocean Center through 2023 while using the Daytona Beach Hilton as the headquarters hotel.

== See also ==
- List of convention centers in the United States
