= Link Gaetz =

Canadian ice hockey player

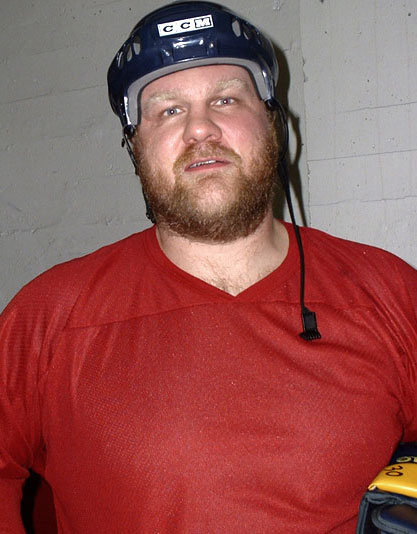
- Gaetz in 2004
- Born: October 2, 1968 (age 57) Vancouver, British Columbia, Canada
- Height: 6 ft 3 in (191 cm)
- Weight: 260 lb (118 kg; 18 st 8 lb)
- Position: Defence
- Shot: Left
- Played for: Minnesota North Stars; San Jose Sharks
- NHL draft: 40th overall, 1988; Minnesota North Stars
- Playing career: 1988–2007

Link Gaetz (born October 2, 1968) is a Canadian former professional ice hockey player who played in the National Hockey League with the Minnesota North Stars and San Jose Sharks.

== NHL career ==
Gaetz was drafted in the second round, 40th overall in the 1988 NHL entry draft by the Minnesota North Stars. According to then-North Stars general manager Lou Nanne, Gaetz was intended to provide on-ice protection for forward Mike Modano, Minnesota's No. 1 overall pick that year. Four months after being drafted by the North Stars, Gaetz was arrested and charged with drunk driving. After 17 games over two seasons with Minnesota, Gaetz was taken by the San Jose Sharks in the 1991 Dispersal Draft. Despite not playing the full season, Gaetz left an impact with San Jose, as he remains the Sharks franchise all-time single season leader in penalty minutes with 326, which he set during their inaugural season. Gaetz was also known for dropping his gloves with several big name tough guys such as Bob Probert, Mike Peluso, Gino Odjick, and Kelly Buchberger.

=== Accident ===
On April 2, 1992, at 10:00 am, Gaetz was thrown from the passenger seat of a car driven by a friend. The friend, later charged with driving under the influence, had lost control on an off-ramp at 80 mph. Gaetz arrived at the Peninsula Hospital with back and facial injuries, and was semi-comatose for eight days. His mother, Sonja Koskinen, flew down from Vancouver to hear doctors say her son might die. His brain stem had been injured, and Gaetz awoke with his left side partially paralyzed and no memory of the accident. He left the hospital after six weeks. Over the next two months, he worked with therapists to regain movement and speech, and he confounded doctors by returning to the ice late that summer, skating twice daily. Several months after he was released from hospital he was arrested for driving under the influence of alcohol. On September 10, 1993, Sharks general manager Dean Lombardi traded the 23-year-old defenseman to the Edmonton Oilers for a tenth-round pick in the 1994 NHL Entry Draft. From there, Gaetz never played another game in the NHL and found himself playing in a wide variety of cities and leagues all over Canada and the United States. The Sharks used the tenth-round pick (240th overall) to draft Tomas Pisa, who never played a professional game.

== Minor leagues and appearances ==
Gaetz played in only 65 career NHL games, spread across three seasons, but he accumulated 412 penalty minutes while playing for the North Stars and Sharks.

Gaetz played on numerous teams, in numerous low-level pro leagues across North America, over a period of 15 years, including time with the North American League (which folded after two games in the fall of 1995), Central Hockey League, Sunshine Hockey League, West Coast Hockey League, American Hockey League, East Coast Hockey League, International Hockey League, Colonial Hockey League, Quebec Semi-Pro Hockey League (renamed Ligue Nord-Américaine de Hockey during his final season), followed by a few games in the semi-professional Northern New Brunswick Senior AAA Hockey League and Canadian Elite Hockey League. He also spent some time in 1994 with Roller Hockey International playing eight games (1G, 3A, 4PTS, 46 PIM) for the Sacramento River Rats where he was kicked off the team for "beating up the trainer", in Gaetz's own recollection.

All told, Gaetz played 646 professional and semi-pro games and amassed 48 goals, 116 assists, 164 points -- and an incredible 4,030 penalty minutes, or over six per game.

=== Hamburger incident ===
While he was playing with the Thetford Mines Prolab of the Ligue Nord-Américaine de Hockey (LNAH) on March 13, 2005, in a game against the Verdun Dragons, Gaetz did not take a shift during the first or second periods. During the second intermission, Gaetz changed out of his jersey and skates and went out to the concession stand to buy a hamburger and "promptly ate it". Thetford Mines Prolab considered this disrespectful to the players, and suspended Gaetz for the remainder of the season. The incident later earned Gaetz the reputation as one of the "quirkiest athletes in pro sports" in Canada.

=== Battle of the Hockey Enforcers ===
Gaetz was one of three former NHL players to take part in the Battle of the Hockey Enforcers, a made-for-TV event held in July 2005 which featured enforcers from various minor leagues fighting on ice in full equipment as if they were in a game-time matchup. Gaetz's opening matchup was against Sherbrooke St-Francois forward Steve Reid. Gaetz went down twice in the opening round and did not participate past the opening fight due to "concussion-like symptoms".

=== Taxi Driver Assault ===
On September 17, 2025, Gaetz was involved in an incident where he had assaulted a taxi driver in Maple Ridge. Gaetz kept telling the driver to abruptly stop right after being picked up, and then started repeatedly punching the driver. After punching the driver, he attempted to break the car's security camera, and then fled. He was then caught, and was charged with assault and mischief under $5000.

=== Video games ===
- NHLPA Hockey '93
- RHI Roller Hockey '95

== Career statistics ==
=== Regular season and playoffs ===
			Regular season					Playoffs
Season	Team	League	GP	G	A	Pts	PIM	GP	G	A	Pts	PIM
1985–86	Quesnel Millionaires	PCJHL	15	0	7	7	4	—	—	—	—	—
1985–86	Abbotsford Falcons	BCHL	2	0	0	0	2	—	—	—	—	—
1986–87	Merritt Warriors	BCHL	7	4	2	6	27	—	—	—	—	—
1986–87	Delta Flyers	BCHL	16	5	10	15	26	—	—	—	—	—
1986–87	New Westminster Bruins	WHL	44	2	7	9	52	—	—	—	—	—
1987–88	Spokane Chiefs	WHL	59	9	20	29	313	10	2	2	4	70
1988–89	Minnesota North Stars	NHL	12	0	2	2	53	—	—	—	—	—
1988–89	Kalamazoo Wings	IHL	37	3	4	7	192	5	0	0	0	56
1989–90	Minnesota North Stars	NHL	5	0	0	0	33	—	—	—	—	—
1989–90	Kalamazoo Wings	IHL	61	5	16	21	318	9	2	2	4	59
1990–91	Kalamazoo Wings	IHL	9	0	1	1	44	—	—	—	—	—
1990–91	Kansas City Blades	IHL	18	1	10	11	178	—	—	—	—	—
1991–92	San Jose Sharks	NHL	48	6	6	12	326	—	—	—	—	—
1992–93	Kansas City Blades	IHL	2	0	0	0	14	—	—	—	—	—
1992–93	Nashville Knights	ECHL	3	1	0	1	10	—	—	—	—	—
1993–94	Cape Breton Oilers	AHL	21	0	1	1	140	—	—	—	—	—
1993–94	Nashville Knights	ECHL	24	1	1	2	261	—	—	—	—	—
1993–94	West Palm Beach Blaze	SuHL	6	0	3	3	15	3	0	1	1	8
1994–95	San Antonio Iguanas	CHL	13	0	3	3	156	—	—	—	—	—
1995–96	San Francisco Spiders	IHL	3	0	0	0	37	—	—	—	—	—
1995–96	Mexico City Toreros	MEX	—	—	—	—	—	—	—	—	—	—
1996–97	Madison Monsters	CoHL	26	2	4	6	178	—	—	—	—	—
1997–98	Anchorage Aces	WCHL	11	0	1	1	130	—	—	—	—	—
1997–98	Miramichi Leafs	NMSHL	—	—	—	—	—	—	—	—	—	—
1997–98	Miramichi Leafs	AC	—	—	—	—	—	2	0	0	0	4
1998–99	Toledo Storm	ECHL	1	0	0	0	2	—	—	—	—	—
1999–00	Eston Ramblers	WGHL	11	0	0	0	112	—	—	—	—	—
2001–02	Rivière-du-Loup Promutuel	QSPHL	35	0	2	2	224	5	1	2	3	50
2002–03	Granby Prédateurs	QSPHL	20	0	0	0	148	—	—	—	—	—
2002–03	Saguenay Paramédic	QSPHL	15	2	1	3	104	4	0	0	0	36
2003–04	Rivière-du-Loup Promutuel	QSPHL	16	0	1	1	194	—	—	—	—	—
2003–04	Trois-Rivières Vikings	QSPHL	3	0	0	0	17	—	—	—	—	—
2003–04	Saint-Jean Mission	QSPHL	13	1	0	1	99	12	0	1	1	51
2004–05	Thetford Mines Prolab	LNAH	22	0	2	2	117	—	—	—	—	—
2004–05	Dawson Creek Canucks	NPHL	3	0	0	0	16	—	—	—	—	—
2005–06	Saint John Scorpions	CEHL	4	0	0	0	51	—	—	—	—	—
2006–07	Horse Lake Thunder	NPHL	3	0	1	1	57	—	—	—	—	—
IHL totals			130	9	31	40	783	14	2	2	4	115
NHL totals			65	6	8	14	412	—	—	—	—	—
