= Lou Franceschetti =

Canadian ice hockey player (born 1958)

- Born: March 28, 1958 (age 67) Toronto, Ontario, Canada
- Height: 6 ft 0 in (183 cm)
- Weight: 190 lb (86 kg; 13 st 8 lb)
- Position: Right wing
- Shot: Left
- Played for: Washington Capitals; Toronto Maple Leafs; Buffalo Sabres
- NHL draft: 71st overall, 1978; Washington Capitals
- Playing career: 1978–1996

Louis Carlo Franceschetti (born March 28, 1958) is a Canadian former professional ice hockey player. He played in the National Hockey League with the Washington Capitals, Toronto Maple Leafs, and Buffalo Sabres between 1981 and 1991. He was selected in the 1978 NHL Amateur Draft by the Washington Capitals, Franceschetti also played for the Toronto Maple Leafs and Buffalo Sabres. Lou was a fan favorite in the late 1980s during his tenure as a Capital, mainly for his hard hits. He retired from active play in 1996, and is now working for a warehouse pallet racking construction company in Toronto, called Rax-Company.

He also played in the Canadian Minor Ball Hockey League, where he played with the York Canadians and finished with 85 goals, 66 assists, and a total of 151 points.

== Career statistics ==
=== Regular season and playoffs ===
			Regular season					Playoffs
Season	Team	League	GP	G	A	Pts	PIM	GP	G	A	Pts	PIM
1975–76	Toronto Nationals U18	U18	17	12	11	23	27	—	—	—	—	—
1975–76	St. Catharines Black Hawks	OMJHL	1	0	0	0	0	—	—	—	—	—
1976–77	Niagara Falls Flyers	OMJHL	61	23	30	53	80	—	—	—	—	—
1977–78	Niagara Falls Flyers	OMJHL	62	40	50	90	46	—	—	—	—	—
1978–79	Saginaw Gears	IHL	2	1	1	2	0	—	—	—	—	—
1978–79	Port Huron Flags	IHL	76	45	58	103	131	7	3	10	13	20
1979–80	Port Huron Flags	IHL	15	3	8	11	31	—	—	—	—	—
1979–80	Hershey Bears	AHL	65	27	29	56	58	14	6	9	15	32
1980–81	Hershey Bears	AHL	79	32	36	68	173	10	3	7	10	30
1981–82	Washington Capitals	NHL	30	2	10	12	23	—	—	—	—	—
1981–82	Hershey Bears	AHL	50	22	33	55	89	—	—	—	—	—
1982–83	Hershey Bears	AHL	80	31	44	75	176	5	1	2	3	16
1983–84	Washington Capitals	NHL	2	0	0	0	0	3	0	0	0	8
1983–84	Hershey Bears	AHL	73	26	34	60	130	—	—	—	—	—
1984–85	Washington Capitals	NHL	22	4	7	11	45	5	1	1	2	15
1984–85	Binghamton Whalers	AHL	52	29	43	72	75	—	—	—	—	—
1985–86	Washington Capitals	NHL	76	7	14	21	131	8	0	0	0	15
1986–87	Washington Capitals	NHL	75	12	9	21	127	7	0	0	0	23
1987–88	Washington Capitals	NHL	59	4	8	12	113	4	0	0	0	14
1987–88	Binghamton Whalers	AHL	6	2	4	6	4	—	—	—	—	—
1988–89	Washington Capitals	NHL	63	7	10	17	123	6	1	0	1	8
1988–89	Baltimore Skipjacks	AHL	10	8	7	15	30	—	—	—	—	—
1989–90	Toronto Maple Leafs	NHL	80	21	15	36	127	5	0	1	1	26
1990–91	Toronto Maple Leafs	NHL	16	1	1	2	30	—	—	—	—	—
1990–91	Buffalo Sabres	NHL	35	1	7	8	28	6	1	0	1	2
1991–92	Buffalo Sabres	NHL	1	0	0	0	0	—	—	—	—	—
1991–92	New Haven Nighthawks	AHL	25	6	7	13	59	—	—	—	—	—
1991–92	Rochester Americans	AHL	49	15	25	40	64	15	3	5	8	31
1992–93	Jacksonville Bullets	SuHL	4	0	0	0	0	—	—	—	—	—
1993–94	Detroit Falcons	CoHL	2	1	1	2	6	—	—	—	—	—
1994–95	Minnesota Moose	IHL	4	1	0	1	12	3	0	0	0	0
1994–95	London Wildcats	CoHL	37	14	41	55	64	5	0	5	5	16
1994–95	HC Selva	ITA-2	13	11	2	13	51	—	—	—	—	—
1995–96	Nashville Knights	ECHL	18	5	13	18	39	3	0	0	0	2
NHL totals			459	59	81	140	747	44	3	2	5	111
