= Mark Green (ice hockey) =

American ice hockey player (1967–2004)

- Born: December 26, 1967 Massena, New York, U.S.
- Died: October 5, 2004 (aged 36) Waterford, New York, U.S.
- Height: 6 ft 4 in (193 cm)
- Weight: 200 lb (91 kg; 14 st 4 lb)
- Position: Left wing
- Shot: Left
- Played for: Johnstown Chiefs; Atlanta Knights; Louisville Icehawks; South Carolina Stingrays; Adirondack Red Wings; Utica Blizzard; Daytona Beach Breakers; Saginaw Lumber Kings; Fayetteville Force; Macon Whoopee; Lubbock Cotton Kings
- NHL draft: 176th overall, 1986; Winnipeg Jets
- Playing career: 1991–2001

Mark R. Green (December 26, 1967 – October 5, 2004) was an American professional ice hockey player who played 10 seasons in various North American minor leagues. He was chosen in the ninth round by the Winnipeg Jets, 176th overall in the 1986 NHL entry draft.

== Career ==
=== High school ===
Green began his career in Watertown minor hockey. By his sophomore year in high school, Green was a top scorer for the Watertown Cyclones. As a sophomore, he led Section 3 in scoring with 86 points. The following year, he led Section 3 with 40 goals and 68 points. He was named to the Empire State Games roster three straight years, and left Watertown High School after three years to attend New Hampton prep school, finishing with 110 career goals and 181 career points for the Cyclones.

=== College ===
Green skated four seasons at Clarkson University. He scored 58 goals and 58 assists in 118 games. During his senior season, he finished with 21 goals and 24 assists and helped the Clarkson Golden Knights reach the Frozen Four in 1991. Green played a key role in the game that clinched the Frozen Four berth, scoring on a power-play late for Clarkson's 4–3 victory over Lake Superior State. Green scored the final goal in Walker Arena history in a preliminary round playoff game against Wisconsin.

=== Professional ===
After four seasons at Clarkson University, Green started his professional career with the ECHL's Johnstown Chiefs. On February 15, 1992, during his rookie season with the Chiefs, Green was able to hit the 50 goals in 50 games mark. Defenseman Dave MacIntyre sent a pass up to Green, who had been skating at center ice. Ferreira tipped the puck back to Green, which negated what could have been a two-line pass. Green then skated to the left circle and faked Raleigh defenseman Kris Miller before beating goalie Mike Mudd high on the right side. Green would finish the season with 68 goals, breaking the Johnstown record set by Galen Head, who had scored 67 goals as a member of the Johnstown Jets. Green's 117 points also broke the Chiefs' single-season points record, previously held by Tom Sasso, who had scored 101 points during the Chiefs' 1988–89 ECHL season. Green would leave the Chiefs after one season, but would continue his scoring pace with several minor league teams.

As a member of the Louisville Icehawks, Green scored 48 goals in 61 games during the 1992–93 ECHL season. Green would leave the ECHL after falling below his normal point per game pace and signed with the Utica Blizzard for the 1994–95 season. He shattered the Utica Blizzard's single season scoring record by scoring 71 goals in 71 games, and won the Colonial Hockey League most valuable player award. The following season, Green scored 51 goals in 60 games for the Blizzard but finished the season with the Daytona Beach Breakers of the upstart Southern Hockey League.

In 1996, Green returned to the Colonial Hockey League and skated with the Saginaw Lumber Kings. He scored a career high 80 goals in 72 games with the Lumber Kings. He re-signed with the Lumber Kings for the 1997–98 season and scored 32 goals in 51 games. Green would leave the team in midseason to sign with the Fayetteville Force of the Central Hockey League. Green finished the season scoring 27 goals in 26 games.

Green signed with the Macon Whoopee for the 1998–99 season and scored 45 in 30 games. In 1999, Green signed with the Lubbock Cotton Kings of the Western Professional Hockey League. In his only season with the Cotton Kings, scored 48 goals and 104 points in 68 games. Green returned to Macon and skated 10 games with the Whoopee before retiring in 2001.

Mark Green was the prototypical low-minor league sniper, notching 503 goals in 617 games (including playoffs) in the lower levels of pro hockey. But he never played in the NHL, and only managed nine games in the high minors, with no goals and four assists for the Atlanta Knights in 1992-93 and the Adirondack Red Wings two years later.

== Records ==
=== Johnstown Chiefs ===
- Goals Scored, Regular Season: 68 (1991–92)
- Goals Scored, Regular Season/Playoffs (1991–92)
- Goals Per Game Average, Season: 1.06 (1991–92)
- Points Scored, Regular Season: 117 (1991–92)
- Hat Tricks, Season: 7 (1991–92)
- 50 goals in 50 games (1991–92)

=== Utica Blizzard ===
- Goals Scored, Regular season: 71 (1994–95)

== Awards ==
- Colonial League MVP Trophy (1994–95)
