= Kelly Dyer =

American ice hockey player

- Born: March 1, 1966 (age 60) Princeton, NJ, USA
- Height: 5 ft 11 in (180 cm)
- Weight: 172 lb (78 kg; 12 st 4 lb)
- Position: Goaltender
- Caught: Left
- Played for: Jacksonville Bullets; West Palm Beach Blaze
- National team: United States
- Playing career: 1989–1996

Kelly Dyer
Medal record

Representing the United States

Women's ice hockey

IIHF World Women's Championships
Silver medal – second place	1994 Lake Placid, USA	
Silver medal – second place	1992 Tampere, Finland	
Silver medal – second place	1990 Ottawa, Canada	

Kelly Dyer (born March 1, 1966, in Princeton, New Jersey, and raised in Acton, Massachusetts) is a member of the Northeastern University athletics Hall of Fame, and a former ice hockey goaltender for the United States women's national ice hockey team.

== Youth ==
Dyer grew up in Acton, Massachusetts, and was a figure skater for the younger years of her life before taking up ice hockey. On why she became a goaltender, “I grew up in a neighborhood with boys who liked to play hockey. They stuck me in goal and shot things at me,” she says. “And I liked it.” Dyer went on the play with the boys during high school, and was on the same team with players such as Tom Barrasso, Jeff Norton, and Bob Sweeney.

== Northeastern University ==
Dyer enrolled at Northeastern where she became a backstop for a Northeastern team that won back-to-back ECAC championships, the de facto National Championship at the time as there was no NCAA tournament yet. Dyer had a career 2.04 goals against average and was the team MVP her final two seasons and posted a record of 48–3–1.

== National team and the pros ==
Dyer was a four-time member of the United States women's national ice hockey team in 1990, 1991, 1994, and 1995, amassing three World Championship silver medals.

Dyer is also one of six women to play men's professional ice hockey. She played as the goaltender for the West Palm Beach Blaze where her team won three Sunshine Hockey League championships.

== Retirement ==
Dyer retired from ice hockey in 1996 when she became a product manager for Louisville Hockey.

== Career statistics ==
Year	Team	Event	Result	GP	W	L	T/OT	MIN	GA	SO	GAA	SV%
1990	USA	WC	2nd place, silver medalist(s)	4	3	1	0	200:00	12	-	3.60	0.855
1994	USA	WC	2nd place, silver medalist(s)	2	-	-	-	129:00	3	-	1.50	0.875
