= Community First Igloo =

Recreational ice rink in Jacksonville, Florida

- Interactive map of Community First Igloo
- Full name: Community First Igloo
- Former names: Jacksonville Ice & Sportsplex, Skate World
- Location: 3605 Philips Highway, Jacksonville, Florida 32207
- Coordinates: 30.29185°N 81.63299°W
- Capacity: Ice hockey: 608
- Surface: Ice
- Field size: 200 x 85

Tenants
- Jacksonville Bullets (SuHL/SHL) (1992–1996); Jacksonville Barracudas (SPHL) (2007–2008); Bold City Battalion (USPHL) (2023–2025); Florida Surge (USPHL) (2026–present)

Community First Igloo is a recreational ice rink facility in Jacksonville, Florida. It is the home practice arena for the Jacksonville Icemen hockey team and the First Coast Figure Skating Club. The facility has also been used by the various amateur hockey and ice skating clubs, and by the University of Florida Gators club hockey team.

The Community First Igloo serves as the forefront for ice sports in Northeast Florida. It houses two NHL-sized ice rinks and offers a variety of different activities for hockey, figure skating, and curling. It offers a wide range of programs for all ages and skill levels. This includes Learn to Skate and Learn to Play lessons in collaboration with Learn to Skate USA®. Both youth and adult hockey leagues are available, along with drop-in hockey and Stick & Puck sessions. Figure skaters can take part in the coaching program and freestyle ice time. The rink is also available for ice rentals, private events, and birthday parties.

The facility served as the home arena for the Jacksonville Bullets, which were owned by Jacksonville Ice owner Bob Sabourin. Later, the Jacksonville Barracudas of the Southern Professional Hockey League (SPHL) used it for training and as an alternate arena when scheduling conflicts precluded them from using their usual venue, the Jacksonville Veterans Memorial Arena. The Barracudas would later declare the Community First Igloo as their home rink.

In 2025, Community First Igloo became the official host for the AAU National Hockey Tournaments.
