= Murray Hood =

Canadian ice hockey player

- Murray Hood, Admirals' Reunion Game, February 22, 2009
- Born: November 17, 1964 (age 61) Toronto, Ontario, Canada
- Height: 5 ft 10 in (178 cm)
- Weight: 165 lb (75 kg; 11 st 11 lb)
- Position: Centre
- Shot: Left
- Played for: Hampton Roads Admirals; Moncton Hawks
- NHL draft: undrafted
- Playing career: 1989–1992

Murray Hood (born November 17, 1964) is a Canadian former professional ice hockey centre who played 138 games with the Hampton Roads Admirals of the East Coast Hockey League between 1989 and 1992.

== Playing career ==
Hood started the 1989-90 season in camp with the Greensboro Generals. He, along with teammate Brian Martin, were traded to the Admirals prior to the start of the season, Hood spent him with Providence, Fort Wayne, and in Austria. In his rookie season with the Admirals, Hood would lead the team with 69 assists and 84 points. However, Hood would not play during the playoffs against the Erie Panthers.

During the 1990-91 ECHL season, Hood scored 82 assists and 103 points for the Admirals. His 82 assists remain a single-season club record. He would also receive a brief one-game call-up from the Admirals' parent club. On December 16, the Moncton Hawks recalled Hood and teammate Brian Martin due to injuries to several Hawks players Hood would go pointless, but would record two minutes for a hooking penalty. Hood's 22 points would help the Admirals win their first Riley Cup, and he would be awarded as the team's Most Valuable Player.

Hood would start the 1991-92 season on the injured reserve. He would come back but Hood would be forced into retirement from the Admirals due to an ECHL rule which allowed only two veterans per team. Coach John Brophy had the choice of removing him or one of two other veterans on the team (Brian Martin and Mike Chighisola). Hood accepted a position as an assistant coach with the Admirals, where he would watch games from the press box and report back to the bench through radio contact. In order for Hood to return to the Admirals as a player, he had to pass through waivers. The Johnstown Chiefs claimed Hood in a move to prevent the center from returning to the Admirals, but a deal was made which allowed Hood to return to the team. The Chiefs would receive an "undisclosed settlement" of cash, which allowed the Admirals to activate Hood. Hood played eighteen games, scoring four goals and twenty seven points, but would finish the season on injured reserve with a back injury At the time of his retirement, Hood retired as the ECHL's all-time assist leader with 174 assists in 139 games.

== Personal ==
Hood married the former Debbie DeVoe, an assistant ticket manager with the Admirals.

Since leaving the Admirals, Hood has been involved in several brushes with the law, including a driving until the influence and a possession of marijuana offense.

Hood currently works as an asphalt graphics technician in the Norfolk area, a position he has held since retiring from hockey.

== Records ==
Murray holds the single-season assist record for the Hampton Roads Admirals, recording 82 assists in 1991-92. At the time of his retirement, he was also the ECHL's career assist leader with 174 assists.

He is also part of an ECHL record where he and teammates Pat Bingham and Billy Nolan scored three goals in 55 seconds, making it the fastest time that one team scored three goals in the postseason. On March 29, 1991, vs the Johnstown Chiefs, Hood scored at the 9:04 mark of the first period. Pat Bingham scored 9 seconds later at the 9:13 mark, and Billy Nolan would score 42 seconds later at the 9:55 mark. Hood's goal and Bingham's goal, scored nine seconds apart would also be an ECHL record for fastest two goals scored by teammates and would stand for over four seasons. Teammates Scott Gruhl and Blaine Moore of the Richmond Renegades would break the record in a game vs the Tallahassee Tiger Sharks on April 12, 1995.

== Awards ==
- 2016 - Inducted into Admirals' Hall Of Fame
