= Schalin =

Schalin is a surname. Notable people with the surname include:

- Bengt Schalin (1889–1982), Finnish garden architect
- Julia Schalin (born 2005), Finnish ice hockey player
- Pasi Schalin (born 1968), Finnish ice hockey player
