= 2026 College Basketball Invitational =

College basketball tournament

- Teams: 16 (planned)
- Finals site: Ocean Center, Daytona Beach, Florida
- "circumstances beyond our control"

The 2026 College Basketball Invitational (CBI) was a planned single-elimination men's college basketball tournament to consist of sixteen NCAA Division I teams.

The event was canceled "due to circumstances beyond our control", per the official CBI social media channels as announced on March 12, 2026.
