= Bill Nyrop =

American ice hockey player (1952–1995)

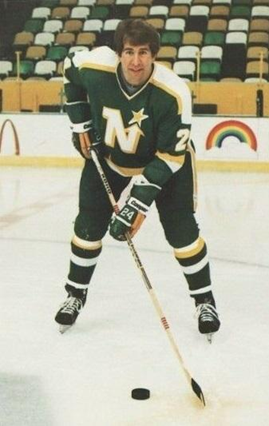
- Born: July 23, 1952 Washington, D.C., U.S.
- Died: December 31, 1995 (aged 43) Minneapolis, Minnesota, U.S.
- Height: 6 ft 2 in (188 cm)
- Weight: 205 lb (93 kg; 14 st 9 lb)
- Position: Defense
- Shot: Left
- Played for: Montreal Canadiens; Minnesota North Stars; Kölner EC
- National team: United States
- NHL draft: 66th overall, 1972; Montreal Canadiens
- Playing career: 1974–1983

William Donald Nyrop (July 23, 1952 – December 31, 1995) was an American professional ice hockey player. He played 207 games in the National Hockey League (NHL) with the Montreal Canadiens and Minnesota North Stars from 1976 to 1982. He won the Stanley Cup with the Canadiens three times, in 1976, 1977, and 1978. Internationally Nyrop played for the American national team at the 1976 Canada Cup, where he served as captain.

== Early life ==
Nyrop was born in Washington, D.C., and his father, Donald Nyrop, served as U.S. Administrator of Civil Aeronautics (now the Federal Aviation Administration) and Chairman of the U.S. Civil Aeronautics Board (now National Transportation Safety Board) under President Harry S. Truman in the early 1950s. Donald Nyrop moved his family to Edina, Minnesota, where he served as president, CEO and chairman of the board of Northwest Airlines from 1954–1976. As a boy, Nyrop attended Edina High School, where he was an all-star athlete, playing quarterback for an undefeated football team and leading the hockey team to the state title in 1969.

After graduation from high school in 1970, Nyrop attended the University of Notre Dame. He tried out for the Notre Dame football team in 1971 and won a spot on the roster as the backup quarterback. However, he was injured in practice and never played for the team, instead playing hockey during his four years in college. After his sophomore year with the Fighting Irish in 1971–72, Nyrop was selected 66th overall by the Montreal Canadiens at the 1972 NHL Amateur Draft. He attended his first pro training camp in September 1972, and in 1973 he was voted on to the WCHA first all-star team and the NCAA west first all-American team. The next year, he represented the United States at the "B" Pool Ice Hockey World Championship where he was named to the tournament All-Star team as the best defenseman.

== Pro career ==
During his first pro season with the American Hockey League's Nova Scotia Voyageurs in 1974–75, Nyrop played with the stability of a seasoned veteran. He made his National Hockey League (NHL) debut the next year on February 22, 1976 with the Montreal Canadiens, dressing for 19 games and became a regular on defense in the playoffs as the Canadiens won the Stanley Cup. Later that year Nyrop scored two points in five games and was stalwart on the defense as team captain for the United States team at the inaugural 1976 Canada Cup. Nyrop spent two years on the Montreal defense and helped the team win the Stanley Cup in 1977 and 1978. After the 1977–78 season, Nyrop stepped away from the game to study law. His rights were traded by the Canadiens to the Minnesota North Stars in September 1980 and he returned to the NHL a year later. He dressed for 42 regular season games with the Stars and two post-season contests in which his team was upset by Chicago in the first round. Nyrop also played briefly for Kölner Haie of the German league in 1982–83 before retiring for good.

== Post career ==
After retirement, Nyrop attended Gonzaga University School of Law in Spokane, Washington, earning his Juris Doctor (J.D.) in 1986. He set up his law practice, but then returned to hockey as the coach of the Knoxville Cherokees of the East Coast Hockey League (ECHL) in 1991-92. The following season, Nyrop became owner and coach of the Sunshine Hockey League's West Palm Beach Blaze. After guiding the club to three straight league championships, he sold his interest in the club due to failing health.

In September 1995, Nyrop was diagnosed with inoperable colon cancer, which had spread to his liver and lungs. He died three months later in his father's home in Minneapolis at age 43.

== Career statistics ==
=== Regular season and playoffs ===
| | | | Regular season | | | | | Playoffs |
| Season | Team | League | GP | G | A | Pts | PIM | GP | G | A | Pts | PIM |
|---|---|---|---|---|---|---|---|---|---|---|---|---|
| 1967–68 | Edina High School | HS-MN | — | — | — | — | — | — | — | — | — | — |
| 1968–69 | Edina High School | HS-MN | — | — | — | — | — | — | — | — | — | — |
| 1969–70 | Edina High School | HS-MN | — | — | — | — | — | — | — | — | — | — |
| 1970–71 | Notre Dame University | WCHA | 30 | 2 | 4 | 6 | 40 | — | — | — | — | — |
| 1971–72 | Notre Dame University | WCHA | 31 | 3 | 18 | 21 | 44 | — | — | — | — | — |
| 1972–73 | Notre Dame University | WCHA | 38 | 3 | 21 | 24 | 46 | — | — | — | — | — |
| 1973–74 | Notre Dame University | WCHA | 33 | 9 | 29 | 38 | 44 | — | — | — | — | — |
| 1974–75 | Nova Scotia Voyageurs | AHL | 75 | 2 | 22 | 24 | 76 | 6 | 0 | 5 | 5 | 0 |
| 1975–76 | Montreal Canadiens | NHL | 19 | 0 | 3 | 3 | 8 | 13 | 0 | 3 | 3 | 12 |
| 1975–76 | Nova Scotia Voyageurs | AHL | 52 | 3 | 25 | 28 | 30 | — | — | — | — | — |
| 1976–77 | Montreal Canadiens | NHL | 74 | 3 | 19 | 22 | 21 | 8 | 1 | 0 | 1 | 4 |
| 1977–78 | Montreal Canadiens | NHL | 72 | 5 | 21 | 26 | 37 | 12 | 0 | 4 | 4 | 6 |
| 1981–82 | Minnesota North Stars | NHL | 42 | 4 | 8 | 12 | 35 | 2 | 0 | 0 | 0 | 0 |
| 1982–83 | Kölner EC | GER | 19 | 3 | 2 | 5 | 8 | — | — | — | — | — |
| NHL totals | | | 207 | 12 | 51 | 63 | 101 | 35 | 1 | 7 | 8 | 22 |

=== International ===
| Year | Team | Event | GP | G | A | Pts | PIM |
|---|---|---|---|---|---|---|---|
| 1974 | United States | WC-B | 7 | 2 | 0 | 2 | — |
| 1976 | United States | CC | 5 | 1 | 1 | 2 | 0 |
| Senior totals | | | 12 | 1 | 1 | 4 | — |

== Awards and honors ==
| Award | Year |
|---|---|
| All-WCHA Second Team | 1972–73 |
| AHCA West All-American | 1972–73 |

- Stanley Cup champion in 1976, 1977 and 1978
- Member of the 1978 National Hockey League All-Star team
- WEC-B All-Star Team in 1974
