= Max Middendorf =

American ice hockey player (born 1967)

- Born: August 18, 1967 (age 57); Syracuse, New York, U.S.
- Height: 6 ft 4 in (193 cm)
- Weight: 210 lb (95 kg; 15 st 0 lb)
- Position: Centre
- Shot: Left
- Played for: Quebec Nordiques; Edmonton Oilers; EC KAC
- National team: United States
- NHL draft: 57th overall, 1985; Quebec Nordiques
- Playing career: 1986–1998

Max C. Middendorf (born August 18, 1967) is an American former professional ice hockey player. He played 13 games in the National Hockey League with the Quebec Nordiques and Edmonton Oilers between 1986 and 1990. The rest of his career, which lasted from 1986 to 1998, was mainly spent in the minor leagues.

== Playing career ==
The 6 ft 4in (195 cm) center was drafted by the Sudbury Wolves of the Ontario Hockey League in 1984.

He joined the OHL club after a spectacular offensive season with the New Jersey Rockets, where he netted 94 goals and 168 points in 58 games as a 16-year-old.

In 63 games with the Wolves in his rookie year, he produced 16 goals and 44 points along with a noticeable willingness to play a rough-and-tumble game, with 106 minutes in penalties.

The Quebec Nordiques selected him in the third round of the 1985 NHL draft, 57th overall. He played parts of three NHL seasons in Quebec before going to the Edmonton Oilers in the 1990–91 campaign.

Middendorf played 13 games in the National Hockey League, collecting 2 goals and 4 assists.

== Career statistics ==
=== Regular season and playoffs ===
			Regular season					Playoffs
Season	Team	League	GP	G	A	Pts	PIM	GP	G	A	Pts	PIM
1982–83	St. Joseph Regional (Montvale)	HS-NJ	—	—	—	—	—	—	—	—	—	—
1983–84	St. Joseph Regional	HS-NJ	27	38	35	73	—	—	—	—	—	—
1984–85	Sudbury Wolves	OHL	63	16	28	44	106	—	—	—	—	—
1985–86	Sudbury Wolves	OHL	61	40	42	82	71	4	4	2	6	11
1986–87	Quebec Nordiques	NHL	6	1	4	5	4	—	—	—	—	—
1986–87	Sudbury Wolves	OHL	31	31	29	60	7	—	—	—	—	—
1986–87	Kitchener Rangers	OHL	17	7	15	22	6	4	2	5	7	5
1987–88	Quebec Nordiques	NHL	1	0	0	0	0	—	—	—	—	—
1987–88	Fredericton Express	AHL	38	11	13	24	57	12	4	4	8	18
1988–89	Halifax Citadels	AHL	72	41	39	80	85	4	1	2	3	6
1989–90	Quebec Nordiques	NHL	3	0	0	0	0	—	—	—	—	—
1989–90	Halifax Citadels	AHL	48	20	17	37	60	—	—	—	—	—
1990–91	Edmonton Oilers	NHL	3	1	0	1	2	—	—	—	—	—
1990–91	Fort Wayne Komets	IHL	15	9	11	20	12	—	—	—	—	—
1990–91	Cape Breton Oilers	AHL	44	14	21	35	82	4	0	1	1	6
1991–92	Cape Breton Oilers	AHL	51	20	19	39	108	—	—	—	—	—
1991–92	Adirondack Red Wings	AHL	6	3	5	8	12	5	0	1	1	16
1992–93	Fort Wayne Komets	IHL	24	9	13	22	58	—	—	—	—	—
1992–93	San Diego Gulls	IHL	30	15	11	26	25	8	1	2	3	8
1993–94	Fort Wayne Komets	IHL	36	16	20	36	43	9	1	2	3	24
1994–95	Fort Wayne Komets	IHL	15	1	4	5	34	—	—	—	—	—
1995–96	EC KAC	AUT	9	1	6	7	86	—	—	—	—	—
1995–96	Bakersfield Fog	WCHL	23	4	12	16	80	—	—	—	—	—
1995–96	Winston-Salem Mammoths	SHL	4	1	5	6	27	—	—	—	—	—
1996–97	Huntsville Channel Cats	CHL	42	14	32	46	79	—	—	—	—	—
1997–98	Fort Worth Brahmas	WCHL	18	4	10	14	56	—	—	—	—	—
AHL totals			259	109	114	223	404	25	5	8	13	46
NHL totals			13	2	4	6	6	—	—	—	—	—

=== International ===
Year	Team	Event	GP	G	A	Pts	PIM
1986	United States	WJC	7	2	2	4	4
Junior totals			7	2	2	4	4
