= Larry Floyd =

- Born: May 1, 1961 (age 64) Peterborough, Ontario, Canada
- Height: 5 ft 8 in (173 cm)
- Weight: 180 lb (82 kg; 12 st 12 lb)
- Position: Centre
- Shot: Left
- Played for: New Jersey Devils
- NHL draft: Undrafted
- Playing career: 1981–1994

Larry David Floyd (born May 1, 1961) is a Canadian former professional ice hockey centre and coach. Floyd played for numerous professional teams during his career from 1982 until 1984, including twelve games with the New Jersey Devils of the National Hockey League (NHL). Floyd also played roller hockey for the San Diego Barracudas in the RHI.

== Biography ==
Floyd was born in Peterborough, Ontario. As a youth, he played in the 1974 Quebec International Pee-Wee Hockey Tournament with a minor ice hockey team from Peterborough. He later played junior ice hockey with the Peterborough Petes from 1978 until 1982. Floyd was not drafted by the NHL, and he pursued a professional career independently. After a professional tryout with the Rochester Americans in 1982, Floyd signed as a free agent with the New Jersey Devils in October 1982 and made his NHL debut February 27, 1983. Floyd would play 75 games that season with the Wichita Wind and seven games with the Devils. The following season (1983–84), Floyd was a member of the Maine Mariners and played five games with the Devils. Floyd would remain in the organization until 1987.

In 1987–88, Floyd split the season between Innsbrucker EV of the Austrian League and the Utica Devils. In 1988–89, Floyd moved to the Cape Breton Oilers, an affiliate of the Edmonton Oilers, where he became an assistant coach as well as a player. Floyd moved to the Phoenix Roadrunners for the next season, then finally to the San Diego Gulls, where he played four seasons. During his last two seasons, Floyd also played roller hockey with the San Diego Barracudas.

In 1994, Floyd turned to coaching, becoming a full-time coach with the Detroit Falcons of the Colonial League. In 1995, Floyd became head coach of the Huntsville Channel Cats, coaching the team for three seasons, each year making the playoffs. Floyd picked up one more season of coaching in 1998–99 with the Flint Generals.

== Playing career ==
=== Career statistics ===
			Regular season					Playoffs
Season	Team	League	GP	G	A	Pts	PIM	GP	G	A	Pts	PIM
1978–79	Peterborough Petes	OMJHL	8	4	5	9	2	14	5	4	9	10
1978–79	Peterborough Jr. Bees	OHA-B	43	54	64	118	63	—	—	—	—	—
1979–80	Peterborough Petes	OMJHL	66	21	37	58	54	14	6	9	15	10
1980–81	Peterborough Petes	OHL	44	26	37	63	43	5	2	2	4	0
1980–81	Wexford Raiders	OPJHL	3	1	2	3	6	—	—	—	—	—
1981–82	Peterborough Petes	OHL	39	32	37	69	26	9	9	6	15	20
1981–82	Rochester Americans	AHL	1	0	2	2	0	7	1	1	2	0
1982–83	Wichita Wind	CHL	75	40	43	83	16	—	—	—	—	—
1982–83	New Jersey Devils	NHL	5	1	0	1	2	—	—	—	—	—
1983–84	Maine Mariners	AHL	74	37	49	86	40	16	9	8	17	4
1983–84	New Jersey Devils	NHL	7	1	3	4	7	—	—	—	—	—
1984–85	Maine Mariners	AHL	72	30	51	81	24	3	0	1	1	2
1985–86	Maine Mariners	AHL	80	29	58	87	25	5	3	3	6	0
1986–87	Maine Mariners	AHL	77	30	44	74	50	—	—	—	—	—
1987–88	Innsbrucker EV	Austria	33	10	22	32	18	—	—	—	—	—
1987–88	Utica Devils	AHL	28	21	21	42	14	—	—	—	—	—
1988–89	Cape Breton Oilers	AHL	70	16	33	49	40	—	—	—	—	—
1989–90	Phoenix Roadrunners	IHL	76	39	40	79	50	—	—	—	—	—
1990–91	San Diego Gulls	IHL	73	24	54	78	34	—	—	—	—	—
1991–92	San Diego Gulls	IHL	71	18	45	63	58	4	0	2	2	0
1992–93	San Diego Gulls	IHL	80	27	31	58	28	14	3	1	4	4
1993–94	San Diego Gulls	IHL	52	10	20	30	45	8	1	0	1	5
NHL totals			12	2	3	5	9	—	—	—	—	—
AHL totals			402	163	258	421	193	31	13	13	26	6
IHL totals			352	118	190	308	215	26	4	3	7	9

== Roller hockey ==
1993 and 1994: San Diego Barracudas (RHI)

== Coach ==
1988–89: Cape Breton Oilers (AHL)
1994–95: Detroit Falcons (CoHL)
1995–96: Huntsville Channel Cats (SHL)
1996–98: Huntsville Channel Cats (CHL)
1998–99: Flint Generals (UHL)
