= San Diego Barracudas =

Defunct US roller inline hockey club, based in San Diego, California

- City: San Diego, California
- Founded: 1993
- Home arena: San Diego Sports Arena
- Colors: Teal, Purple, Black, White
- Murphy Cups: None
- Conference Championships: None
- Division Championships: None

Franchise history
- San Diego Barracudas (1993 - 1996)

The San Diego Barracudas were a professional inline hockey team based in San Diego, California, that competed in Roller Hockey International. The team played its home games at the San Diego Sports Arena. The team played from 1993 through 1996.

The team relocated to Ontario, California, in the 1998 and 1999 seasons; they were known as the Ontario Barracudas, and were considered a replacement for the Palm Desert/Ontario Silvercats.

== Leading scorers ==
- 1993: Daniel Shank (28 goals, 31 assists)
- 1994: Scott Gruhl (28 goals, 33 assists)
- 1995: John Spoltore (14 goals, 34 assists)
- 1996: John Spoltore (16 goals, 48 assists)

== Team records ==
- Most goals, season: Max Middendorf, 29 (1993)
- Most assists: Allen Leggett, 87
- Most assists, season: John Spoltore, 48 (1996)
- Most points, season: John Spoltore, 64 (1996)
- Most penalty minutes: Daniel Shank & Max Middendorf, 107
- Most penalty minutes, season: Daniel Shank, 107 (1993)
- Most games played: Alan Leggett, 72
- Most games played, goaltender: Frankie Ouellette, 70

== Season-by-season record ==
Season	W	L	T	OTL	Points	Finish	Playoffs
1993	5	9	0	--	10	3rd in Buss Div.	did not qualify
1994	9	9	4	--	22	4th in Pacific Div.	lost first round (LA)
1995	12	11	1	--	25	3rd in Pacific Div.	lost second round (ANA)
1996	9	18	0	1	19	4th in Pacific Div.	did not qualify

== Alumni who also played in the NHL ==
- Ralph Barahona
- Matt DelGuidice
- Clark Donatelli
- Scott Gruhl
- Rick Vargas
- Max Middendorf
- Daniel Shank
- Larry Floyd

== Alumni who also played in European Hockey Leagues ==
- Stefan Grogg
