= Battle of the Hockey Enforcers =

2005 ice hockey fighting event in Canada

- Venue: CN Centre
- Location: Prince George, British Columbia, Canada
- Dates: 27 August 2005

The Battle of the Hockey Enforcers (also known as Hockey Enforcers: Black & Blue) was a sporting event held at the CN Centre in Prince George, British Columbia, Canada, on August 27, 2005. The event consisted of ice hockey enforcers (mostly from minor and senior men's leagues) fighting on the ice in full hockey gear, as sometimes seen in regular games. Like in the National Hockey League, no fighting on the ground was allowed, and the referees separated the fighters if the fight turned too one-sided. For player safety concerns, officials also temporarily stopped fights if helmets or gloves were accidentally removed, with disqualifications in effect if they were removed on purpose. If a fight did not end in a referee stoppage, it was judged by a panel of hockey experts.

Hockey Enforcers was the brainchild of Canadian promoter Darryl Wolski, whose efforts to hold this show and find a willing city & venue were the subject of the feature Hockey Brawl: Battle on Thin Ice for CTV's W5, which won the Gemini Award in 2006 for Best Sports Program or Series. After failed attempts to host the event in Winnipeg, Manitoba and Philadelphia, Pennsylvania, and a measure of controversy due to the nature of hockey fighting, Hockey Enforcers was held in Prince George, British Columbia to some success. The CN Centre attracted about 2,000 spectators, only about one third capacity, and despite encouraging pay per view sales, a teased second show in the spring of 2006 never materialized. A DVD of the show, under the Hockey Enforcers: Black and Blue title, was subsequently released by Video Service Corp.

Commentators for this event were Ian Furness and then-AHL player Brantt Myhres, while Gilles Peloquin and Wayne Veary called the event in French. Amy Hayes served as the interviewer and announcer for pre-match introductions, while Ray Walker announced winners and decisions, and Geoff Gregoire was the lead referee. The rink-side judges were Paul Brown, John Craighead, and Steve Parsons. Songs by such artists as State of Shock, Seemless, Art of Dying and Bruce Kulick were used as entrance themes.

Though originally planned as a one night 16-man tournament with four round robin groupings and winners advancing to the semifinals (similarly to international ice hockey tournaments), a number of forfeits and byes were made due to injuries and other withdrawals. Advertising for the event listed 31 total bouts, but only 19 were held, including a pre-finals exhibition bout which saw Derek Parker defeat Jamie Leinhos via unanimous decision.

== Participants ==
Most players in the tournament were selected from the Ligue Nord-Américaine de Hockey, a Quebec-based senior men's league that is notorious for high amounts of fighting in games. Aside from three who had retired from hockey before the tournament, then-AHL player Mike Sgroi and online fan vote winner Eddie O'Toole were the only active players in the field that weren't on an LNAH roster. Three NHL alums competed in the tournament, they being Kent Carlson, Link Gaetz, and Jason Simon, though Gaetz withdrew after experiencing concussion-like symptoms after his first fight, and only Carlson was able to win a match at all between them. Fellow NHL veteran Lyndon Byers was also scheduled to compete, but pulled out of the event shortly before it began.

The tournament champion was UHL veteran Dean Mayrand, picking up the $62,250 top prize. He defeated minor league journeyman Mike Sgroi, then of the AHL's Albany River Rats, in the finals by split decision, after previously winning both of his group stage bouts. Jason Rushton was awarded third place after fellow semifinalist Steve Reid couldn't compete in a planned third place match.

#	Competitor	Age	Hometown	Current Team (as of August 2005)	Finish
27	Jason Bone	25	Keeseekoowenin, Manitoba	Verdun Dragons (LNAH)	2nd place, Group B
3	Kent Carlson	43	Concord, New Hampshire	Retired (last played in the NHL in 1989)	2nd place, Group A
23	Link Gaetz	36	Vancouver, British Columbia	Thetford Mines Prolab (LNAH)	4th place, Group A
22	John Hewitt	28	Portage La Prairie, Manitoba	Sorel-Tracy Mission (LNAH)	3rd place, Group B
19	Jamie Leinhos	29	Montreal, Quebec	Trois-Rivieres Caron & Guay (LNAH)	2nd place, group D
55	Dean Mayrand	27	Windsor, Ontario	Sorel-Tracy Mission (LNAH)	Tournament Champion
89	Eddie O'Toole	35	Mississauga, Ontario	Mississauga Bulldogs (OHA)	4th place, group C
23	Derek Parker	22	Melville, Saskatchewan	Saint-Hyacinthe Cristal (LNAH)	2nd place, group C
33	Trent Potskin	31	Prince George, British Columbia	Sorel-Tracy Mission (LNAH)	3rd place, group C
33	Chadd Radke	34	Bowden, Alberta	Retired (last played in Switzerland's National League A)	3rd place, group D
3	Mark Raiter	32	Calgary, Alberta	Retired (last played in the ECHL in 1996)	3rd place, group A
47	Steve Reid	26	Leamington, Ontario	Sherbrooke St. Francois (LNAH)	Semifinalist
55	Jason Rushton	30	Victoria, British Columbia	Saint-Georges-de-Beauce Garaga (LNAH)	Semifinalist
22	Mike Sgroi	27	Toronto, Ontario	Albany River Rats (AHL)	Finalist
12	Jason Simon	36	Sarnia, Ontario	Sherbrooke St. Francois (LNAH)	4th place, group B

=== Group stage ===
==== Group A ====
Competitor One	Result	Competitor Two
Steve Reid (1-0)	TKO	Link Gaetz (0-1)
Kent Carlson (1-0)	TKO	Mark Raiter (0-1)
Mark Raiter (1-1)	Forfeit (injury)	Link Gaetz (0-2)
Steve Reid (2-0)	Unanimous decision	Kent Carlson (1-1)
Steve Reid (3-0)	Forfeit (equipment failure)	Mark Raiter (1-2)
Kent Carlson (2-1)	Forfeit (injury)	Link Gaetz (0-3)

==== Group B ====
Competitor One	Result	Competitor Two
Mike Sgroi (1-0)	TKO	Jason Simon (0-1)
Jason Bone (1-0)	Unanimous decision	John Hewitt (0-1)
Mike Sgroi (2-0)	Unanimous decision	Jason Bone (1-1)
John Hewitt (1-1)	TKO	Jason Simon (0-2)
Jason Bone (2-1)	Forfeit (injury)	Jason Simon (0-3)
Mike Sgroi (3-0)	Forfeit (injury)	John Hewitt (1-2)

==== Group C ====
Competitor One	Result	Competitor Two
Dean Mayrand (1-0)	Split decision	Derek Parker (0-1)
Trent Potskin (1-0)	Unanimous decision	Eddie O'Toole (0-1)
Dean Mayrand (2-0)	TKO	Eddie O'Toole (0-2)
Derek Parker (1-1)	TKO	Trent Potskin (1-1)
Derek Parker (2-1)	TKO	Eddie O'Toole (0-3)
Dean Mayrand (3-0)	Forfeit (injury)	Trent Potskin (1-2)

==== Group D ====
Competitor One	Result	Competitor Two
Jason Rushton (1-0)	Unanimous decision	Jamie Leinhos (0-1)
Chadd Radke (1-0)	Forfeit (opponent withdrawal)	Lyndon Byers
Jason Rushton (2-0)	TKO	Chadd Radke (1-1)
Jamie Leinhos (1-1)	Unanimous decision	Jason Bone (2-2; crossover from Group B)

==== Knockout stage ====
Semifinals
A	Steve Reid
B	Mike Sgroi	TKO
C	Dean Mayrand	UD
D	Jason Rushton

Finals
B	Mike Sgroi
C	Dean Mayrand	SD

== See also ==
- Enforcer (hockey)
- Fighting in ice hockey
