= Mike Sgroi =

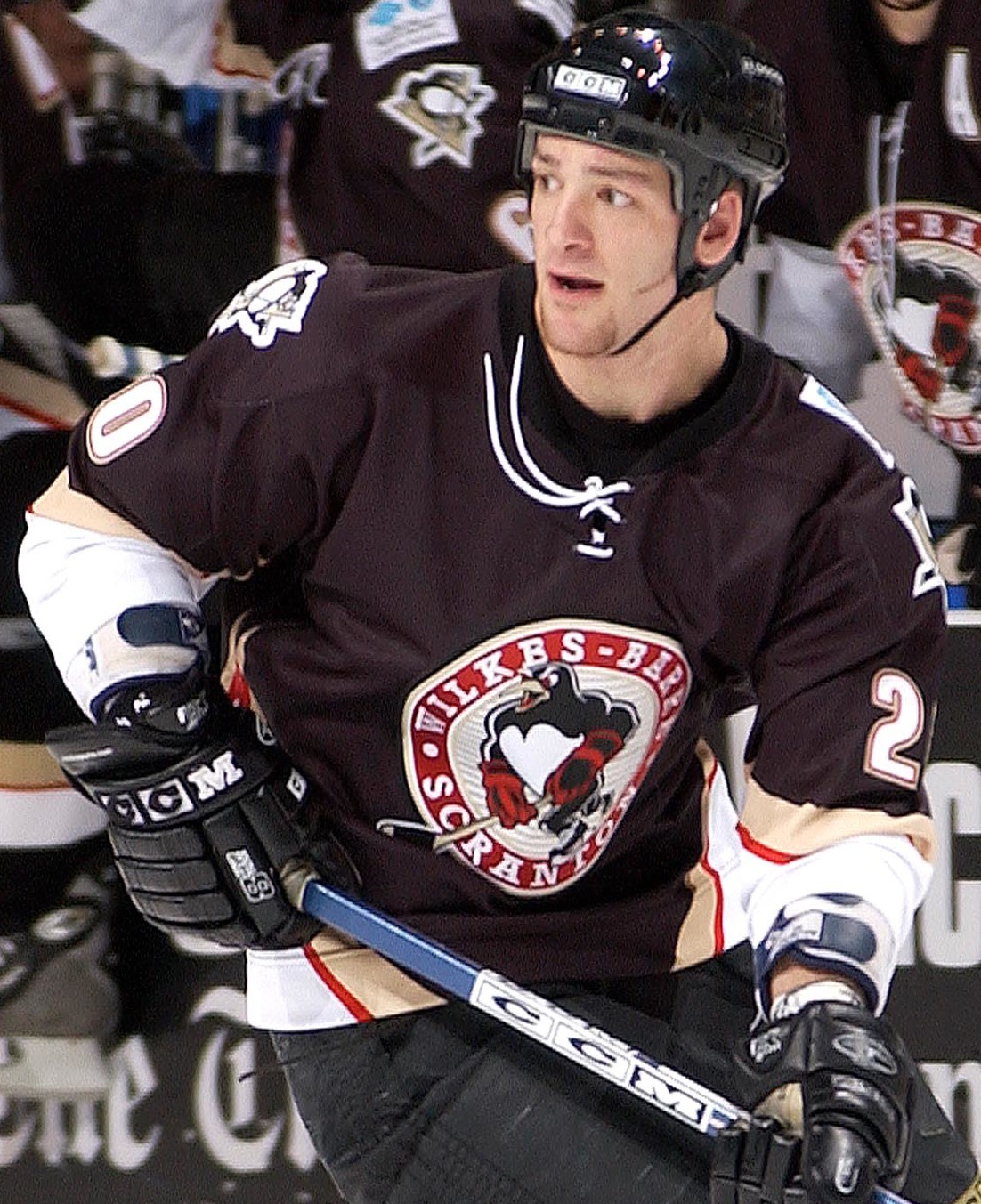
- Sgroi with the Wilkes-Barre/Scranton Penguins in 2004
- Born: August 14, 1978 (age 48) Toronto, Ontario, Canada
- Height: 6 ft 5 in (196 cm)
- Weight: 230 lb (104 kg; 16 st 6 lb)
- Position: Left wing
- Shot: Left
- Played for: Albany River Rats; Binghamton Senators; Bridgeport Sound Tigers; Chicago Wolves; Colorado Eagles; Elmira Jackals; Evansville IceMen; Greensboro Generals; Idaho Steelheads; Johnstown Chiefs; Laredo Bucks; Lexington Men O' War; New Orleans Brass; Norfolk Admirals; Orlando Solar Bears; Pensacola Ice Pilots; Quad City Mallards; Rapid City Rush; Rockford Icehogs; Sheffield Steelers; Syracuse Crunch; Texas Brahmas; Toledo Storm; Utah Grizzlies; W-B/S Penguins; Wheeling Nailers
- NHL draft: undrafted
- Playing career: 2000–2017

Mike Sgroi (born August 14, 1978) is a Canadian former professional ice hockey player. Sgroi last played for the Orlando Solar Bears of the ECHL, the 28th team of his professional career.

== Career ==
=== Early career ===
In August 2005, Sgroi participated in the Battle of the Hockey Enforcers in Prince George, British Columbia, a one night made-for-TV event that featured enforcers from various minor leagues (largely Quebec's LNAH) fighting on-ice in full equipment, with Sgroi standing out as the only participant in the field that was currently on an AHL roster. In the group stage, Sgroi defeated NHL veteran Jason Simon and Jason Bone by TKO and unanimous decision respectively, before earning a forfeit win over John Hewitt due to injury. After winning the group, Sgroi defeated Steve Reid by TKO in the semifinals before losing to Dean Mayrand by split decision in the finals.

=== 2007–08 ===
During the 2007–08 ECHL season, Sgroi was traded from Pensacola for Michael Cohen. Later that year, Sgroi set a career high in goals with 25 total, which quickly become a fan favorite in Johnstown.

=== 2008–09 ===
On January 24, 2008, Sgroi was traded to the Utah Grizzlies for future considerations. However, it was short-lived, as Sgroi only played one game with the Grizzlies before he was traded to the Elmira Jackals. After he was traded twice in one week, this alerted clubs to his availability. There were two clubs however that were said to be very interested in Sgroi's services, these were Coventry Blaze and Sheffield Steelers, both of whom play in the top league in the United Kingdom. After a few weeks their interest was said to have died down.

=== 2009–10 ===
Sgroi started the season in training camp with the Rochester Americans of the AHL. On September 28, 2009, Sgroi was cut from Amerks camp. On November 2, 2009, Sgroi signed a one-year contract with the Laredo Bucks of the CHL and wore jersey #22. After a month with the team, Sgroi was waived by the Bucks on December 10, 2009.

On January 26, 2010, the Elite Ice Hockey League Club Sheffield Steelers announced that they have signed Sgroi to a contract. To make room for him, the Steelers released forward Brad Cruikshank. Despite putting up 18 points in 20 games and providing the role of enforcer for the Steelers, the Steelers announced on May 20, 2010 that Sgroi would not be returning to the team.

On October 22, 2010, the Colorado Eagles of the Central Hockey League signed Sgroi to a contract.

=== 2011–12 ===
On August 18, 2011, the Evansville IceMen of the Central Hockey League signed Sgroi to a contract.

=== 2012–13 ===
Sgroi signed a one-year contract with the CHL's Rapid City Rush on July 19, 2012. Sgroi was released by the Rush on October 21, 2012. He was later signed by the Orlando Solar Bears of the ECHL. Sgroi has been on and off of the Solar Bears' roster, having been signed and released three separate times within his two months with the team, most recently been released on March 13, 2013.

Sgroi retired from professional hockey at the end of the 2016-17 ECHL season.

== Personal ==
- Sgroi is also a mixed martial arts fighter who teaches muay thai in the offseason. According to an Elmira Jackals press release, Sgroi started his mixed martial arts career 5–0.
- Sgroi also enjoys playing poker in his offtime and has competed in tournaments. He once finished 27th out of 780 players in a World Series of Poker event
- Sgroi appears in the 2010 EA Sports video game NHL Slapshot. He is not assigned to a team, but can be found on the game's free agent list.
- Sgroi makes his home in Orlando, Florida.
