= Donald Nyrop =

American aeronautics administrator (1912–2010)

Donald William Nyrop (April 1, 1912 – November 16, 2010) served as U.S. Administrator of Civil Aeronautics (now the Federal Aviation Administration) and Chairman of the U.S. Civil Aeronautics Board (now National Transportation Safety Board) under President Harry S. Truman in the early 1950s.

A native of Elgin, Nebraska, Nyrop moved his family to Edina, Minnesota, where he served as president, CEO, and chairman of the board of Northwest Airlines from 1954–1976. He was the father of Bill Nyrop (1952 – 1995), a professional ice hockey player who won three Stanley Cups with the Montreal Canadiens in 1976, 1977, and 1978. Nyrop was also the CEO of Northwest Airlines when D.B. Cooper committed the infamous 1971 hijacking.

== Early life ==
Nyrop graduated from Doane College in Nebraska in 1934 and then from George Washington University law school.
