= 1994–95 Sunshine Hockey League season =

The 1994–95 Sunshine Hockey League season was the third season of the Sunshine Hockey League, a North American minor pro league. Five teams participated in the league, and the West Palm Beach Blaze won the Sunshine Cup for the third consecutive year.

== Regular season ==
	GP	W	L	OTL	GF	GA	Pts
West Palm Beach Blaze	57	38	15	4	322	244	80
Jacksonville Bullets	57	33	23	1	291	255	67
Daytona Beach Sun Devils	56	23	32	1	240	299	47
Lakeland Ice Warriors	56	18	37	1	264	320	37
Fresno Falcons	16	9	7	0	76	75	18

== Sunshine Cup-Playoffs ==
Sunshine Cup-Semifinals
1	West Palm Beach Blaze	2
3	Daytona Beach Sun Devils	0
2	Jacksonville Bullets	1
4	Lakeland Ice Warriors	0

Sunshine Cup-Final
1	West Palm Beach Blaze	3
2	Jacksonville Bullets	0
