= 1992–93 Sunshine Hockey League season =

The 1992–93 Sunshine Hockey League season was the first season of the Sunshine Hockey League, a North American minor pro league. Five teams participated in the league, and the West Palm Beach Blaze won the Sunshine Cup.

== Regular season ==
	GP	W	L	OTL	GF	GA	Pts
West Palm Beach Blaze	45	38	6	1	275	166	77
Jacksonville Bullets	47	22	23	2	228	218	46
Daytona Beach Sun Devils	48	18	25	5	226	258	41
Lakeland Ice Warriors	52	18	30	4	202	287	40
St. Petersburg Renegades	20	10	6	4	100	102	34

== Sunshine Cup-Playoffs ==
Sunshine Cup-Semifinals
1	West Palm Beach Blaze	2
4	Lakeland Ice Warriors	1
2	Jacksonville Bullets	2
3	Daytona Beach Sun Devils	0

Sunshine Cup-Final
1	West Palm Beach Blaze	3
2	Jacksonville Bullets	0
