= 1993–94 Sunshine Hockey League season =

The 1992–93 Sunshine Hockey League season was the second season of the Sunshine Hockey League, a North American minor pro league. Four teams participated in the league, and the West Palm Beach Blaze won the Sunshine Cup for the second consecutive year.

== Regular season ==
	GP	W	L	OTL	GF	GA	Pts
West Palm Beach Blaze	54	37	14	3	282	205	77
Jacksonville Bullets	54	32	21	1	290	229	65
Lakeland Ice Warriors	54	23	28	3	280	301	48
Daytona Beach Sun Devils	54	16	34	3	210	327	35

== Sunshine Cup-Playoffs ==
Sunshine Cup-Semifinals
1	West Palm Beach Blaze	2
4	Daytona Beach Sun Devils	0
2	Jacksonville Bullets	2
3	Lakeland Ice Warriors	0

Sunshine Cup-Final
1	West Palm Beach Blaze	3
2	Jacksonville Bullets	0
