= Winston-Salem Mammoths =

- City: Winston-Salem, North Carolina
- League: Southern Hockey League
- Founded: 1995
- Home arena: The Annex
- General manager: Patrick Doyle
- Head coach: John Anderson

Franchise history
- 1995-1996: Winston-Salem Mammoths

The Winston-Salem Mammoths were an American ice hockey team in Winston-Salem, North Carolina. They played in the Southern Hockey League for the 1995-96 season. The Mammoths lost in the finals to the Huntsville Channel Cats in the only season of the Southern Hockey League. The team was coached by former Toronto Maple Leafs player John Anderson and Patrick Doyle was the team's general manager. The team was owned by Beaver Sports Properties.

== Season-by-season record ==
| Season | GP | W | L | SOL | Pts | GF | GA | Place | Playoffs |
|---|---|---|---|---|---|---|---|---|---|
| 1995-96 | 60 | 30 | 23 | 7 | 67 | 273 | 274 | 3., SHL | Lost Final |

== Records ==
- Games: Alain Côté, Hayden O'Rear, Bruno Villeneuve 60
- Goals: Yvan Corbin 52
- Assists: Alexei Dejev 51
- Points: Yvan Corbin 95
- PIM: Mike Degurse 302
