= World Indoor Football League =

World Indoor Football League may refer to:

- World Indoor Football League (1988), a planned American indoor football league in 1988
- World Indoor Football League (2007), a defunct American indoor football league in 2007
