= West Palm Beach Barracudas =

Professional minor league ice hockey

- City: West Palm Beach, Florida
- League: SHL
- Operated: 1992–1996
- Home arena: West Palm Beach Auditorium
- Colors: Black, Teal, Red
- Media: Palm Beach Post

Franchise history
- 1992–95: West Palm Beach Blaze (SuHL)
- 1995–96: West Palm Beach Barracudas (SHL)

Championships
- Regular season titles: 1993, 1994, 1995
- Playoff championships: 1993, 1994, 1995

The West Palm Beach Barracudas were a professional minor league ice hockey team based in West Palm Beach, Florida. They played in the Sunshine Hockey League, later renamed the Southern Hockey League, from 1992 to 1996. They played their games at the West Palm Beach Auditorium.

== History ==
The team's logo when known as the Blaze

The team was founded, by two Montana ranchers, Jim King and Bill Nyrop, formerly of the NHL Montreal Canadiens, as the Blaze in 1992. One of the inaugural franchises of the Sunshine Hockey League, a league with six teams mostly based in Florida. They dominated the Sunshine Hockey League, finishing with the best record and winning the championship in each year of the league's existence, defeating the Jacksonville Bullets each time in the finals.

After the Sunshine Hockey League transformed into the Southern Hockey League, they were reformed as the West Palm Beach Barracudas but were unable to duplicate their success, finishing with a losing record. They folded along with the league after one season, when their home venue, the Coliseum was closed to the public and sold.

=== Season-by-season record ===
Season	League	GP	W	L	OTL	Pts	GF	GA	PIM	Coach	Finish	Playoffs
1992–93	SuHL	45	38	6	1	77	275	166	1272	Bill Nyrop	1st	Won championship, 3–0 (Jacksonville)
1993–94	SuHL	54	37	14	3	77	282	205	1433	Bill Nyrop	1st	Won championship, 3–0 (Jacksonville)
1994–95	SuHL	57	38	15	4	80	322	244	1852	Bill Nyrop	1st	Won championship, 3–0 (Jacksonville)
1995–96	SHL	60	26	32	2	54	251	319	2084	Phil Berger	4th	out of playoffs
