= Lakeland Prowlers =

- City: Lakeland, Florida
- League: SHL
- Operated: 1992-1996
- Home arena: RP Funding Center
- Colors: Red, purple

Franchise history
- 1992 to 1995: Lakeland Ice Warriors (SuHL)
- 1995 to 1996: Lakeland Prowlers (SHL)

The Lakeland Prowlers were a minor professional ice hockey team located in Lakeland, Florida. They began play as the Lakeland Ice Warriors in the Sunshine Hockey League from 1992 to 1995. In 1995, the Sunshine Hockey League became the Southern Hockey League, and the team changed their name to the Lakeland Prowlers. The team attended WCW Monday Nitro on February 5, 1996, and can be seen wearing their jerseys in the fifth row. Following the 1995–96 season both the Southern Hockey League and the team folded.
