= Jacksonville Bullets =

- City: Jacksonville, Florida
- League: SuHL
- Founded: 1992
- Home arena: Skate World
- Colors: Black, gold, white
- Owner: Nick Durbano
- Head coach: Lou Franceschetti(1992–93) Doug Keans (1993–95); Dan Belisle (1995–96)
- Asst. coach: David Baker (1993–95)
- Media: The Times-Union
- Affiliates: unaffiliated

Franchise history
- 1992–1996: Jacksonville Bullets

Championships
- Regular season titles: None
- Division titles: None

The Jacksonville Bullets were a professional minor league ice hockey team based in Jacksonville, Florida. They played in the Sunshine Hockey League, later renamed the Southern Hockey League, from 1992–1996. They played their games at Jacksonville Coliseum and Skate World, now known as Jacksonville Ice & Sportsplex.

== History ==
The Bullets were founded in 1992 as one of the inaugural franchises of the Sunshine Hockey League, a start up league with six teams mostly based in Florida. They were the first ice hockey team to be based in Jacksonville in nearly twenty years, since the Jacksonville Barons of the American Hockey League had folded in 1974. They played alternately at the Jacksonville Coliseum and Skate World, a skating rink on Jacksonville's Southside.

In 1993 GM Nick Durbano brought in former NHL goaltender Doug Keans as Head Coach and Assistant Coach David Baker. The team played barely above the .500 mark in its first season, yet found themselves in the 1993 Sunshine Cup final under coach Doug Keans. In the final the Bullets lost to the powerhouse West Palm Beach Blaze. Though often successful on the ice the Bullets struggled with attendance and finances throughout their run. In 1994 they were bought by the owners of Skate World, one of whom was Bob Sabourin, who had been the coach of Jacksonville's first professional hockey team, the Jacksonville Rockets. They remained in the league when its name was changed to the Southern Hockey League in 1995. However, their difficulties in attracting fans were exacerbated that year with the arrival of another hockey team, the Jacksonville Lizard Kings. The Lizard Kings played in the more formidable East Coast Hockey League and had a substantially more effective marketing campaign, and were able to lease the Coliseum for their games. The Bullets managed to survive through the season, but folded along with the league at the end of the 1995–96 season. The ECHL Club followed suit a year later and folded.

== Miscellaneous ==
The radio play-by-play announcer for the Jacksonville Bullets was Howard Brigance, who was one of the founders of amateur hockey in the Jacksonville area. Brigance also did play-by-play announcing for the nearby Jacksonville Lizard Kings.

Brigance died due to a heart attack on November 29, 2004. He was 65 years old.
