= Southern Hockey League (1995–96) =

Defunct ice hockey league

- Sport: Ice hockey
- Founded: 1995
- Folded: 1996
- Replaced by: Central Hockey League (partial)
- No. of teams: 6
- Last champion: Huntsville Channel Cats

The Southern Hockey League (abbreviated SHL) is a defunct low-level professional ice hockey league.

It operated in the United States for one season, 1995–1996, with teams in the southeastern United States. It was originally named the Sunshine Hockey League, but changed its name after expanding outside of Florida. The league only played one season. The Huntsville Channel Cats, along with the planned 1996–97 expansion teams Columbus Cottonmouths, Macon Whoopee, and Nashville Nighthawks, joined the Central Hockey League following the SHL's demise.

== Final standings ==
=== Regular season ===
Team	GP	W	L	SOL	GF	GA	Pts
Lakeland Prowlers	60	41	13	6	342	229	88
Daytona Beach Breakers	60	33	20	7	297	251	73
Winston-Salem Mammoths	60	30	23	7	273	274	67
Huntsville Channel Cats	60	27	31	2	274	294	56
West Palm Beach Barracudas	60	26	32	2	251	319	54
Jacksonville Bullets	60	23	33	4	282	352	50

=== Playoffs ===
Semifinals
1	Lakeland Prowlers	7	8	2	3	2
4	Huntsville Channel Cats	6	5	3	5	5
3	Winston-Salem Mammoths	3	6	5	8	x
2	Daytona Beach Breakers	4	1	3	3	x

Final
4	Huntsville Channel Cats	3	4	4	8	5	x	x
3	Winston-Salem Mammoths	5	3	3	7	2	x	x
