= Daytona Beach Breakers =

Ice hockey team from Florida

The Daytona Beach Breakers were a Single 'A' professional ice hockey team based in Daytona Beach, Florida. The team began playing as the Sun Devils in the Sunshine Hockey League's first season in 1992–93 and remained with the SuHL until 1995, when the league changed its name to Southern Hockey League. The team became known as the Breakers while playing in the SHL. After the 1995–96 season both the team and the league folded.
