= Sunshine Hockey League =

Low-level minor professional ice hockey league

The Sunshine Hockey League (SuHL) was a low-level minor professional ice hockey league which operated from 1992 to 1995. The league was based in Florida and consisted of five teams in its inaugural 1992–93 season. Each team's initial head coaches were former NHL players including Bill Nyrop, West Palm Beach; Rocky Saganiuk, Daytona Beach; Jim Mikol, Lakeland Warriors; and Lou Francheschetti, Jacksonville Bullets.

The St. Petersburg Renegades, led by Jim McGeough as player-coach, joined the league after the season had already begun. However, the team folded two months later. In the 1993 final, the West Palm Beach Blaze defeated the Jacksonville Bullets in a three-game sweep for the Sunshine Cup.

The league founders, who were adamant in the initial season not to include "professional" in the name of the league, suggested a high-level junior program was better suited to the cities due to the lack of quality dates and virtually no practice rinks in the state. Despite the obvious attendance problems and lack of facilities in the state to grow the sport, the team owners, in a heavily disputed move, continued in the professional ranks, changed leagues names and eventually folded.

The 1993–94 season saw the St. Petersburg Renegades franchise fold mainly because of the team's proximity to the National Hockey League's (NHL) Tampa Bay Lightning, who announced a move from Expo Hall to the Florida Suncoast Dome until their new arena was built in downtown Tampa. The Renegades had issues with the ability of the Bayfront Center to make and keep professional caliber ice. The team was losing the battle for fan support, as an average of 889 people attended their games. In the 1994 final, the West Palm Beach Blaze again defeated the Jacksonville Bullets in a three-game sweep for the Sunshine Cup.

In its final season of 1994–95, the league included the Fresno Falcons. This was an unusual addition, since all of the teams in the Sunshine Hockey League were based in Florida and the Falcons' home ice was located in California. Fresno had difficulty finding any competitive teams in California to compete with and agreed to fly the SHL teams to California to get the Western League started. Fresno played 16 games that season and was not included in postseason play. In the 1995 final, for the third consecutive year, the West Palm Beach Blaze defeated the Jacksonville Bullets in a three-game sweep for the Sunshine Cup.

Goaltender Kelly Dyer, one of five females to ever play professional hockey in North America, played in the SHL with the West Palm Beach Blaze from 1993 to 1995. In three seasons with the team, she made 15 appearances, and went 4-0-0 with a 6.75 GAA. Dyer also joined the Daytona Beach SunDevils on a winter trip to France and Italy to compete in an international tournament that Daytona's former head coach, Constant Priondolo, and their GM, Dave MacPherson, put together. Dominic Delannoy, majority owner of the SunDevils, was a former French national team player. The tournament was held in Briancon, France, with games in Gap, Toulon and Nice.

In 1995, the league expanded outside of Florida and changed its name to the "Southern Hockey League". With the city of West Palm Beach selling its coliseum to a national religious group, the league was left with only a merger to continue. Many SHL players went on to careers in Europe, the NHL, AHL, and ECHL.

== Teams ==
- Daytona Beach Sun Devils
- Fresno Falcons
- Jacksonville Bullets
- Lakeland Ice Warriors
- St. Petersburg Renegades
- West Palm Beach Blaze

== League results ==
Season	Regular season champions	Sunshine Cup champions	Runners-up
1992–93	West Palm Beach Blaze (38-6-0-1)	West Palm Beach Blaze	Jacksonville Bullets
1993–94	West Palm Beach Blaze (37-14-0-3)	West Palm Beach Blaze	Jacksonville Bullets
1994–95	West Palm Beach Blaze (38-15-0-4)	West Palm Beach Blaze	Jacksonville Bullets

== League leaders ==
Season	Goals	Assists	Points	PIM
1992–93	Scott Garrow, WPB (41)	Scott Garrow, WPB (41)	Scott Garrow, WPB (86)	Mark Dearborn, LKL (167)
1993–94	Joe Musa, JAX (45)	Joe Musa, JAX (55)	Joe Musa, JAX (100)	Mats Larson, JAX (230)
1994–95	Joe Musa, JAX (40)	Craig Teeple, DB (61)	Roman Hubalek, WePB (95)	Mats Larson, JAX (335)
