= Dignity Health Theater and Convention Center =

Performing arts theater in Bakersfield, California

Dignity Health Theater & Convention Center
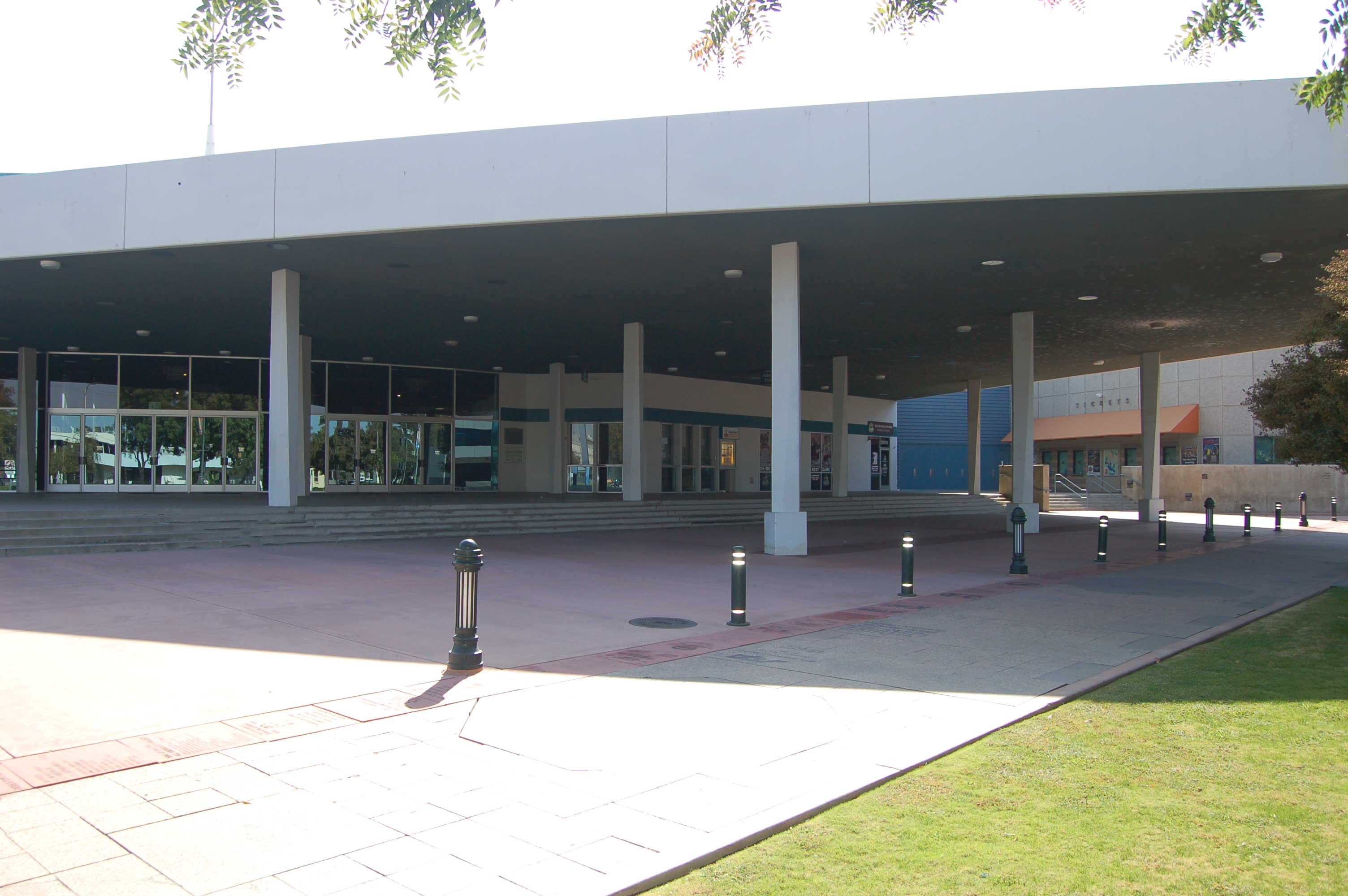
- Dignity Health Theater and Convention Center Entrance
- Interactive map of Dignity Health Theater & Convention Center
- Former names: Bakersfield Civic Auditorium (1962-1980); Bakersfield Convention Center (1980-1998); Centennial Garden & Convention Center (1998-2005); Rabobank Theater & Convention Center (2005-2019); Mechanics Bank Theater & Convention Center(2019-March 2025)
- Address: 1001 Truxtun Ave.
- Location: Bakersfield, California
- Coordinates: 35.372°N 119.013°W
- Owner: City of Bakersfield
- Operator: ASM Global

Construction
- Built: 1960 - 1962
- Opened: November, 1962
- Expanded: 1980, 1998
- Cost: $5.5 million

Tenants
- Cal State Bakersfield Roadrunners (NCAA) (1965–1998); Bakersfield Kernals (CalHL) (1962-1963); Bakersfield Flyers (Senior) (1968-1969); Los Angeles Bruins (PSHL) (1970-1972); Bakersfield Oilers (PSHL) (1994-1995); Bakersfield Fog (WCHL) (1995-1998); Bakersfield Dragons (SCAHA) (1995-1998)

Website
- dignityhealtharena.com

The Dignity Health Theater and Convention Center (formerly Bakersfield Civic Auditorium) is a performing arts theater and convention facility located in Bakersfield, California (specifically in the Civic Center, Downtown). It is adjacent to the Dignity Health Arena.

== History ==
The Civic Auditorium was originally constructed in 1962, to attract the convention trade to the city. The first show at the auditorium was the Ice Capades, which was on November 20, 1962. The structure was one of Bakersfield's first buildings constructed in a definitively modern style. In addition to housing the communities’ musical groups, such as the Bakersfield Symphony Orchestra, it also contained a scenery loft and an orchestra pit, to facilitate Broadway musicals and ballets.

By 1976, Bakersfield began plans for the facilities' first major expansion. The plan would include construction of a convention center, which would be intertwined with the existing theater. It would also include the construction of a hotel directly adjacent and connected to the theater. The convention center was completed in 1980, but budget problems would delay the hotel until 1993. The name was also changed to the Bakersfield Convention Center.

In 1998, the facility was again modified. The parking lot, located east of the facility, was removed for the construction of the 10,000-seat sports arena. The combined complex was renamed the Centennial Garden and Convention Center. Incorporated in the design of the sports complex was a connection to the exhibit hall. This unique feature allows for the convention center to be used as a staging ground or warm-up facility for events being held in the arena.

The entire complex was renamed seven years later in 2005, when the city signed a 10-year agreement with Rabobank, to name the complex the Rabobank Arena, Theater and Convention Center. This agreement was renewed for an additional 10 years in 2015. Following the acquisition of Rabobank, N.A. by Mechanics Bank in 2019, the naming rights transferred to Mechanics Bank and the complex was renamed once again. In February 2025, the city of Bakersfield announced that Dignity Health has bought the naming rights of the arena, which will be renamed Dignity Health Arena, Theater and Convention Center. The new name will go into effect on March 1, 2025, and run through December 31, 2035.

== See also ==
- Dignity Health Arena
- List of convention centers in the United States
