= California Hawks =

- City: Anaheim, California
- League: Pacific Southwest Hockey League, Pacific Hockey League
- Founded: 1981
- Folded: 1995

Franchise history
- 1981–1983: Tri-Valley Blackhawks
- 1983–1985: West Covina Blackhawks
- 1985–1988: California Blackhawks
- 1988–1994: California Hawks
- 1994–1995: Bakersfield Oilers

Championships
- Playoff championships: 1991, 1993

The California Hawks were a semi-professional ice hockey team from Anaheim, California. Originally located in Tri-Valley, the club joined the Pacific Southwest Hockey League in 1981 and remained active until 1995.

== History ==
After the dissolution of the California Eagles, and Reno Gamblers in 1980–81, the PSHL was down to just two teams. In short order, two new clubs were arranged with one in the San Francisco area. the Tri-Valley Blackhawks lasted two seasons before moving south to the Los Angeles suburb of West Covina. The move did not prove beneficial for the club and the team relocated for a second time in 1985. The then-named California Blackhawks found a better home in Anaheim and also began to turn things around on the ice, making their first postseason appearance in 1986. The team shortened its name to 'Hawks' in 1988 and then pulled off a stunning upset in 1991, winning the league championship over the 1-loss San Diego Surf. Two years later the team won its second PSHL championship and had enough of a following to be included in the merger with teams from the Pacific Northwest in 1994. The Hawks played one season in the Pacific Hockey League but by then the team was on unstable footing and they moved to Bakersfield before season's end. The desperate move did not pan out and the franchise folded after the season.

== Season-by-season results ==
Season	GP	W	L	T	Pts	Finish	Postseason
1981–82	–	–	–	–	–	–	missed
1982–83	18	1	16	1	3	4th	missed
1983–84	17	4	12	1	9	4th	missed
1984–85	18	7	9	2	16	3rd	missed
1985–86	17	9	6	2	20	2nd	Runner-Up
1986–87	17	6	8	3	15	3rd	missed
1987–88	18	6	9	3	15	3rd	missed
1988–89	–	–	–	–	–	–	missed
1989–90	–	–	–	–	–	3rd	Semifinal
1990–91	18	5	11	2	12	3rd	Champions
1991–92	–	–	–	–	–	–	missed
1992–93	–	–	–	–	–	–	Champions
1993–94	–	–	–	–	–	–	Runner-Up
1994–95	–	–	–	–	–	–	missed
