= Sacramento Rebels =

- City: Sacramento, California
- League: California Western Hockey League; Pacific Southwest Hockey League
- Founded: 1975
- Folded: 1980
- Home arena: Ice House Skating Complex

Championships
- Playoff championships: 1976, 1978

The Sacramento Rebels were a semi-professional ice hockey team from Sacramento, California. The club played five seasons in the California Western Hockey League and Pacific Southwest Hockey League.

== History ==
The Rebels were one of four founding members of the CWHL, northern California's answer to the Pacific Southwest Hockey League. The Rebels were the best team during the inaugural year but found themselves in trouble in the championship. With the series tied 1-1 and Stockton leading 3–4 in the deciding match, player coach Norm Johnson became irate with a referee after a call and threw his stick at the official, Bernie Carter, before attacking him. Another player, Al Anton, assaulted the second referee and then attacked the Rebels' Dean Berard. A 10-minute melee broke out with fans hurling bottles onto the ice and the local sheriff had to be called in to quell the mini riot. Because Stockton had started the brawl, Sacramento was declared the winner of the game and the championship.

Despite the fireworks of the first season the league found itself in financial trouble by 1978 and was left with just two clubs. At the same time, the San Diego Sharks of the PCHL had folded and that league needed a new member. Both Sacramento and Berkeley attempted to join the PSHL but only the Rebels ended up making the transition. Sacramento tried to survive in the new league, however, with the added travel costs the team was unable to sustain itself long-term. By 1980 Ron Miller, the club's major shareholder, was no longer willing to support the Rebels and the team folded after the season.

== Season-by-season results ==
Season	GP	W	L	T	Pts	Finish	Postseason
1975–76	20	15	2	3	33	1st	Champions
1976–77	–	–	–	–	–	–	missed
1977–78	30	12	12	6	30	2nd	Champions
1978–79	–	–	–	–	–	–	missed
1979–80	–	–	–	–	–	–	missed
