= Tiger blood =

Tiger blood or tiger's blood can refer to:

- the blood of a tiger
- a phrase used by actor Charlie Sheen
- Tiger's blood, a flavor of frozen desserts also called tiger blood
- Tigers Blood, a 2024 album by Waxahatchee
- Tiger Blood, a 2013 album by The Quill
- "Tiger Blood", a track on the single "Wetsuit / Tiger Blood" by the Vaccines, 2011
- "Tiger Blood", a song by Houndmouth from the album Lordy, 2026
- "Tiger's Blood" (song), by Brandon Flowers, 2026
- Tiger Blood, a sequel novel to The Tiger's Apprentice by Laurence Yep
