= Golden State Condors =

- City: Torrance, California
- League: Pacific Southwest Hockey League
- Founded: 1981
- Folded: 1986

The Golden State Condors were a semi-professional ice hockey team from Torrance, California. The club joined the Pacific Southwest Hockey League in 1981 and remained active until 1986.

== History ==
After the dissolution of the California Eagles, and Reno Gamblers in 1980–81, the PSHL was down to just two teams. The Golden State Condors were one of two new teams created to put the league back up to four members. Initially, the Condors were a mild success, posing respectable records for their first few campaigns. In the team's fifth season, they took a sharp downturn and went winless for the entire year. After the season, the team was disbanded and replaced by the Burbank Jets.

== Season-by-season results ==
Season	GP	W	L	T	Pts	Finish	Postseason
1981–82	–	–	–	–	–	–	missed
1982–83	18	7	9	2	16	3rd	missed
1983–84	18	6	12	0	12	3rd	missed
1984–85	18	7	11	0	14	4th	missed
1985–86	17	0	17	0	0	4th	missed
