= Burbank Jets =

- City: Burbank, California
- League: Pacific Southwest Hockey League
- Founded: 1986
- Folded: 1993

Franchise history
- 1986–1991: Burbank Jets
- 1991–1992: Lake Arrowhead Jets
- 1992–1993: Los Angeles Jets

Championships
- Playoff championships: 1992

The Burbank Jets were a semi-professional ice hockey team from Burbank. The franchise was a member of the Pacific Southwest Hockey League and was in existence for seven years.

== History ==
Burbank was initially created to fill in for the dissolution of the Golden State Condors and keep the PSHL a four-team circuit. The Jets shared the same home rink as the Los Angeles Bruins in their first two seasons but, after the Bruins folded in 1988, the Jets hade the barn all to themselves. Unfortunately, the same financial problems that caused the demise of the Bruins began to affect the Jets by the early 1990s. The franchise relocated west to Lake Arrowhead ahead of the 1991–92 season and proceeded t win their first league championship. They were rechristened as the Los Angeles Jets for the next season but that didn't help their monetary situation and the team folded in 1993.

== Season-by-season results ==
| Season | GP | W | L | T | Pts | Finish | Postseason |
|---|---|---|---|---|---|---|---|
| 1986–87 | 17 | 1 | 16 | 0 | 2 | 4th | missed |
| 1987–88 | 18 | 5 | 9 | 4 | 14 | 4th | missed |
| 1988–89 | – | – | – | – | – | – | Runner-Up |
| 1989–90 | – | – | – | – | – | 4th | missed |
| 1990–91 | 18 | 7 | 10 | 1 | 15 | 2nd | Semifinals |
| 1991–92 | – | – | – | – | – | – | Champions |
| 1992–93 | – | – | – | – | – | – | missed |
