= Las Vegas Outlaws =

Las Vegas Outlaws may refer to:

- Las Vegas Outlaws (ice hockey), ice hockey team active in the 1970s
- Las Vegas Outlaws (XFL), American football team in the XFL
- Las Vegas Outlaws (arena football), Arena Football League team
