= San Diego Surf =

San Diego Surf may refer to:

- San Diego Surf SC, a youth soccer club
- Oceanside Surf, a former basketball team previously known as San Diego Surf
- San Diego Surf (film), a 1968 film by Andy Warhol
- San Diego Surf (ice hockey), a former semi-professional ice hockey team.
