= Ron Flockhart =

Ron Flockhart may refer to:

- Ron Flockhart (racing driver) (1923–1962), British racing driver
- Ron Flockhart (ice hockey) (born 1960), retired Canadian professional ice hockey player
