= California Western Hockey League =

The California Western Hockey League was a semi-professional ice hockey league that operated in Northern California for three seasons in the mid-1970s.

== History ==
With the relative success of the Pacific Southwest Hockey League in and around Los Angeles, four teams in the northern part of the state were created in 1975 and formed the CWHL. Similar to their southern counterparts, the CWHL was a typical low-level hockey league of the era; rife with goals and fights while beered-up crowd looked on. The circuit started as a 4-team league and lost the Squaw Valley Eagles after only one season. The Berkeley Blazers replaced them for the second year and, other than that, the league was made up of the same teams for its existence.

In 1978, both Stockton and Twin City folded after the end of the third season, leaving the future of the league in doubt. Instead of creating new franchises and trying to soldier on, both Berkeley and Sacramento tried to get the PSHL to accept them as new members. Defending champions Sacramento had the inside track and agreed to terms in May. Berkeley continued to lobby for entry but by summer's end the decision had been made and Berkeley was left by itself. The Blazers suspended operations and the league ceased to exist.

== Teams ==
- Berkeley Blazers
- Twin City Flyers
- Sacramento Rebels
- Squaw Valley Eagles
- Stockton Colts
