= Bakersfield Condors (1998–2015) =

Defunct ECHL ice hockey team

- City: Bakersfield, California
- League: ECHL
- Conference: Western
- Division: Pacific
- Founded: 1995
- Operated: 1995–2015
- Home arena: Mechanics Bank Arena
- Colors: Black, maroon, silver, white
- Media: Fox Sports 970
- Affiliates: Anaheim Ducks; Edmonton Oilers

Franchise history
- 1995–1998: Bakersfield Fog
- 1998–2015: Bakersfield Condors
- 2015–present: Norfolk Admirals

Championships
- Division titles: 1 2009–10

The Bakersfield Condors were a minor league ice hockey team based in Bakersfield, California in the Pacific Division of the ECHL's Western Conference. The Condors played home games at Rabobank Arena.

== History ==
Originally known as the "Bakersfield Fog", the team was founded in 1995 as a charter member of the West Coast Hockey League. They replaced the Bakersfield Oilers of the Pacific Southwest Hockey League when that league folded in 1994. The team became the "Condors" in 1998 when it moved into the new Centennial Garden. The Condors, and other West Coast Hockey League teams, joined the ECHL in 2003.

For the 2008–09 season, the Condors announced an affiliation with the Anaheim Ducks of the National Hockey League on May 21, 2008. They became the Ducks' secondary affiliate, after the Iowa Chops of the American Hockey League. In the following season, the Condors became the Ducks' primary affiliate after the Chops were suspended from operations. As a result, the Condors started the season with a handful of the Ducks' prospects and finished the season first in the Pacific to capture their first division title. On July 12, 2010, the Ducks opted to move their ECHL affiliate closer to their East Coast AHL affiliate and cut ties with the Condors after two seasons.

On July 18, 2013, the Condors announced an affiliation with the Edmonton Oilers.

On January 23, 2014, it was announced that the team was purchased by the Daryl Katz-owned Oilers Entertainment Group, which also owns the Edmonton Oilers. In January 2015, it was announced that the ECHL incarnation of the Condors would be relocating to Norfolk, Virginia and become the Norfolk Admirals after being displaced by the Oklahoma City Barons of the American Hockey League relocating to become the new Bakersfield Condors for the 2015–16 season. The original Norfolk Admirals of the American Hockey League were also relocated following the 2014–15 season to San Diego, California.

== Season-by-season record ==
Season	League	Division	GP	W	L	T	OTL	SOL	Pts	PCT	GF	GA	PIM	Coach(es)	Result
1995–96	WCHL	WCHL	58	24	29	0	0	5	53	0.457	271	323	1439	Keith Gretzky	Out of playoffs
1996–97	WCHL	WCHL	64	33	26	0	0	5	71	0.555	345	325	2061	Keith Gretzky	Lost in round 1
1997–98	WCHL	WCHLS	64	22	37	0	0	5	49	0.383	226	330	1949	Keith Gretzky	Lost in round 1
1998–99	WCHL	WCHLS	70	21	40	0	0	9	51	0.364	213	308	2010	Kevin MacDonald	Lost in round 1
1999–00	WCHL	WCHLS	72	34	29	0	0	9	77	0.535	244	272	2343	Kevin MacDonald	Lost in round 1
2000–01	WCHL	WCHLS	72	26	36	0	0	10	62	0.431	220	273	2147	Kevin MacDonald	Lost in round 1
2001–02	WCHL	WCHLS	72	32	35	0	0	5	69	0.479	213	237	1377	Paul Kelly	Lost in round 1
2002–03	WCHL	WCHL	72	41	22	0	0	9	91	0.632	253	186	1625	Paul Kelly	Lost in round 1
2003–04	ECHL	Pacific	72	25	38	0	0	9	59	0.410	201	236	1750	Paul Kelly, Marty Raymond	Out of Playoffs
2004–05	ECHL	West	72	40	22	0	5	5	90	0.625	232	205	1691	Marty Raymond	Lost in round 1
2005–06	ECHL	Pacific	72	40	26	0	2	4	86	0.597	221	222	1814	Marty Raymond	Lost in round 3
2006–07	ECHL	Pacific	72	41	19	0	3	9	94	0.653	270	236	1556	Marty Raymond	Lost in round 3
2007–08	ECHL	Pacific	72	26	37	0	2	7	61	0.424	230	280	1772	Marty Raymond	Lost in round 2
2008–09	ECHL	Pacific	72	33	31	0	3	5	74	0.514	246	263	1250	Marty Raymond	Lost in round 1
2009–10	ECHL	Pacific	72	38	29	0	4	1	81	0.563	232	243	1270	Marty Raymond	Lost in round 2
2010–11	ECHL	Pacific	72	41	27	0	2	2	86	0.597	222	210	1528	Marty Raymond	Lost in round 1
2011–12	ECHL	Pacific	72	24	41	0	4	3	55	0.382	199	241	1356	Matt O'Dette	Out of playoffs
2012–13	ECHL	Pacific	72	22	44	0	2	4	50	0.347	171	247	1292	Matt O'Dette	Out of playoffs
2013–14	ECHL	Pacific	72	36	30	0	2	4	78	0.542	197	202	1184	Troy Mann	Lost in round 3
2014–15	ECHL	Pacific	72	26	38	0	3	5	60	0.417	202	265	1047	Jean-Francois Houle	Out of playoffs

Records as of May 15, 2015.

== Players ==
=== Notable NHL alumni ===
List of Bakersfield Condors alumni who played more than 25 games in Bakersfield and 25 or more games in the National Hockey League.

- Alexandre Bolduc
- Laurent Brossoit
- Kyle Calder
- Guillaume Lefebvre
- Maxime Macenauer

=== Notable players ===
Known for his journalistic contributions, Ken Baker, played one game as goaltender for the Condors in the 2001–02 season, finishing with a win, a 5.00 GAA and a 0.857 save percentage. Baker's dreams of playing professional hockey were cut short due to a tumor that inhibited his ability to build enough muscle for the sport. However, his book They Don't Play Hockey in Heaven tells the story of his experience with the Condors.

Moreover, Canadian singer and songwriter, Justin Bieber, was also offered a tryout contract by the Bakersfield Condors in September 2012. The Condors released their entry level offer after stating that "Bieber has some hockey skills".

Parker Stanfield played 80 games for the Bakersfield Condors before signing for HP Poprad.

=== Retired numbers ===
- 16 – Paul Willett
- 17- Paul Rosebush
- 26 – Glen Mears
- 28 – Jamie Cooke
- 74 – Steve Dowhy

== Team highs ==
The Condors advanced past the first round of the playoffs for the first time in their history in the 2005–06 season. They defeated the Long Beach Ice Dogs in seven games. The Condors lost in the seventh game of the next round against the Fresno Falcons, making it the longest playoff run in Condors history at the time. The Condors did it again the following year, defeating Fresno, but then lost in the second round to the Alaska Aces in four games. However, in the 2013–14 season, the Condors had their furthest playoff run in team history, getting to the Western Conference Finals, where they lost to the Alaska Aces in six games.

== Controversy ==
In the 2004–05 ECHL playoffs, Condor Ashlee Langdone checked Alaska Ace Scott Gomez (who was playing that season in the ECHL due to the NHL lockout) hard, sending him hip first into the sharp opening of the bench door at the exact moment the trainer opened it for a line change. The resulting injury, a broken pelvis, knocked Gomez out of the rest of the playoffs, and resulted in Langdone being given a boarding penalty and an eight-game suspension. The incident drew a rather negative reaction due to Gomez's status as an NHL all-star.

In March 2011, the Condors held "Charlie Sheen Night" which garnered national media attention as one of the best promotions in minor league sports history. The promotion, based on the antics of the Two and a Half Men actor, offered fans free admission with proof of a clean drug test, "tiger's blood" margaritas, Charlie Sheen heads on sticks, and if anyone had the money, they could buy the team for $2 million outright. That was Sheen's annual salary for the show he was eventually fired from.

=== Lawsuit ===
Head coach Marty Raymond and former assistant coach Mark Pederson were briefly suspended in 2009 for an "internal matter", which was reported at the time to be due to antisemitic comments made by both men toward then-Condor Jason Bailey, a Jewish player. The team did not publicly acknowledge the reason for the suspensions until after the season, when GM Matthew Riley stated that "all parties involved were satisfied with the action that was taken." However, in January 2011, the Anaheim Ducks, Condors, Raymond and Pederson were named in a lawsuit filed by Bailey's lawyer, Keith Fink, alleging that his client faced "a barrage of anti-Semitic, offensive and degrading verbal attacks regarding his Jewish faith" during this time with the team. On January 27, ESPN.com released details of court documents in which Fink alleges that Condors' owner Jonathan Fleisig failed to take action after being informed of the issue: promising Bailey's father that the Raymond and Pederson would both be fired, but then failing to do so. The documents also allege that Raymond told Bailey his ex-wife was Jewish and that she was "a 'bitch' for taking all of his money."
