= Manon Rhéaume =

Canadian ice hockey player (born 1972)

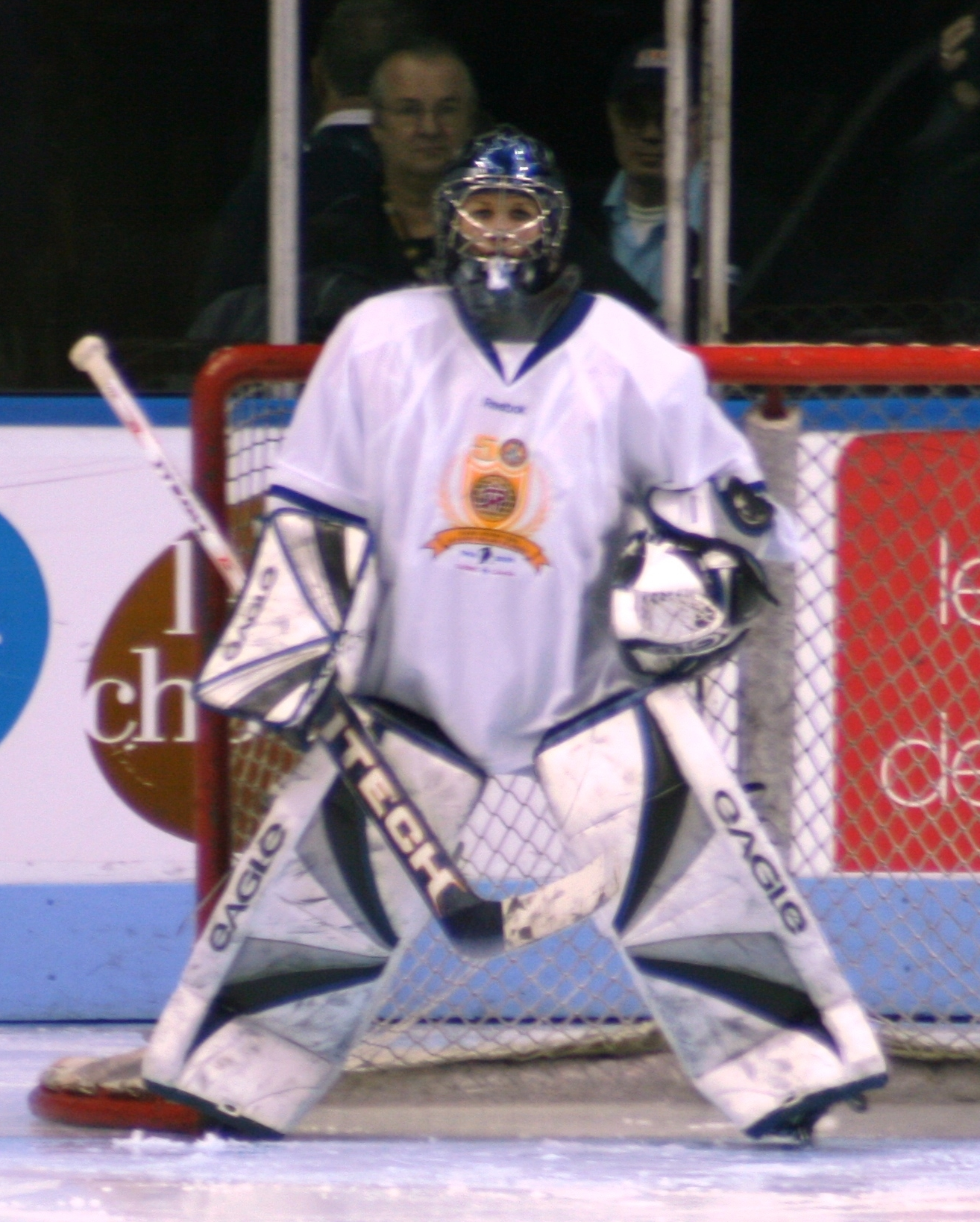
- Rhéaume in 2010
- Born: February 24, 1972 (age 54) Beauport, Quebec, Canada
- Height: 5 ft 7 in (170 cm)
- Weight: 130 lb (59 kg; 9 st 4 lb)
- Position: Goaltender
- Caught: Left
- Played for: QMJHL; Trois-Rivières Draveurs; IHL; Atlanta Knights; Las Vegas Thunder; Flint Generals; Port Huron Icehawks; WWHL; Minnesota Whitecaps; Austria; VEU Feldkirch; RHI; New Jersey Rockin' Rollers; Ottawa Loggers; Sacramento River Rats; ECHL; Knoxville Cherokees; Nashville Knights; Tallahassee Tiger Sharks; WCHL; Reno Renegades; National Hockey League; Tampa Bay Lightning (preseason)
- National team: Canada
- Playing career: 1992–2009
Medal record
Representing Canada
Women's ice hockey
Olympic Games
Silver medal – second place	1998 Nagano	Tournament
IIHF World Women's Championships
Gold medal – first place	1992	Tournament
Gold medal – first place	1994	Tournament

Manon Rhéaume (born February 24, 1972) is a Canadian former ice hockey goaltender and the first general manager of the Detroit Clutch in the Professional Women's Hockey League. An Olympic silver medalist, she achieved a number of historic firsts during her career, including becoming the first woman to play in an exhibition game in any of the major North American pro-sports leagues.

In 1992, Rhéaume signed a contract with the Tampa Bay Lightning of the National Hockey League (NHL), appearing in preseason exhibition games in 1992 and 1993. She spent five years in professional minor leagues, playing for a total of seven teams and appearing in 24 games. She also played on the Canada women's national ice hockey team, winning gold medals at the IIHF Women's World Championship in 1992 and 1994, and the silver medal at the 1998 Winter Olympics.

== Playing career ==
Rhéaume played for the Sherbrooke Jofa-Titan squad in the League Régionale du Hockey au Féminin in the province of Québec. She was the first female goaltender to play for a boys' team in the 1984 Quebec International Pee-Wee Hockey Tournament. Rhéaume was signed to the Trois-Rivières Draveurs in the Quebec Major Junior Hockey League, one of Canada's top junior ice hockey leagues, for the 1991–92 season, becoming the first woman to play in a men's Major Junior hockey game.

In 1992, Rhéaume tried out for the Tampa Bay Lightning; this was the first time a woman tried out for an NHL team. She played one period in a preseason game against the St. Louis Blues, allowing two goals on nine shots, and played in another preseason game against the Boston Bruins in 1993.

Also in 1992, Rhéaume was selected for the Canada national women's ice hockey team. She won gold medals at the 1992 and 1994 IIHF Women's World Championships, and was named to the All-Star team both years. She won the silver medal at the 1998 Winter Olympics in Nagano.

In 1992, Rhéaume was signed by the Atlanta Knights of the International Hockey League (IHL). Her first appearance against the Salt Lake Golden Eagles marked the first time a woman appeared in a regular season professional game. She played for seven different teams between 1992 and 1997, including Atlanta, the Knoxville Cherokees, Nashville Knights, the Las Vegas Aces, the Tallahassee Tiger Sharks, Las Vegas Thunder, and the Reno Renegades, appearing in a total of 24 games. While in Atlanta, Rhéaume wrote her autobiography, Manon: Alone in Front of the Net. She initially retired from professional hockey in 1997.

== Later life ==
For the 1999–2000 season, Rhéaume was the goaltending coach of the Minnesota Duluth Bulldogs women's ice hockey program. She entered into the business world in 2000, serving as marketing director for Mission Hockey in Irvine, California, developing and promoting girls' hockey equipment for three years. She later worked in marketing at the Powerade Iceport in Milwaukee and with the Central Collegiate Hockey Association.

In 2008, Rhéaume suited up for the Minnesota Whitecaps of the Western Women's Hockey League, and in 2009 helped lead them to the Clarkson Cup finals of the Canadian women's ice hockey championships. On March 19, 2009, the Whitecaps, with Rhéaume in net, beat the Montreal Stars in a playoff game by a score of 4–3 in overtime, with Kim St. Pierre in net for the Stars. During the 2008–09 WWHL season, Rhéaume's Whitecaps took two of three games from the Calgary Oval X-Treme, snapping a string that saw the X-Treme go two years without tasting defeat in the regular season.

In October 2008, the IHL's Port Huron Icehawks announced plans to have Rhéaume take part in their training camp activities and play for at least one period of the team's exhibition season opener. On April 3, 2009, Rhéaume suited up for one game with the Flint Generals IHL team. She had been with the practice team since January, filling in for their regular goalie. Rhéaume is the third woman to play for the Generals.

In 2015, Rhéaume dropped the puck in the ceremonial opening faceoff before the first National Women's Hockey League game.

In October 2021, Rhéaume was hired by Bally Sports Detroit as an analyst and reporter for the Detroit Red Wings.

She was a goaltender for the 2022 NHL All-Star game's Breakaway Challenge.

Rhéaume was hired in July 2022 as a hockey operations and prospect advisor for the Los Angeles Kings.

On May 15, 2026, it was announced that Rhéaume would be the GM for the newly formed Detroit Clutch team in the Professional Women's Hockey League.

== First women's hockey card ==
Manon Rhéaume's 1992 Classic Games trading cards were the first of a women’s hockey player ever produced. Since those first cards in 1992, over 1400 cards of Rhéaume have been produced, the most of any women's hockey player ever by a wide margin.

== Media and popular culture ==
Rhéaume guest-starred as herself in the made-for-TV movie A Beachcombers Christmas with Tiger Williams and Jyrki Lumme. At the height of her popularity, she was approached to pose for Playboy Magazine, which she refused.

In 2011, Rhéaume took part in the Quebec TV show Le défi des champions (Champions' Challenge), a show that trained eight Quebec athletes (such as Isabelle Charest, Bruny Surin, Marc Gagnon, Marie-Andrée Lessard, Étienne Boulay, Nathalie Lambert and Mathieu Dandenault) to the art of the circus.

In June 2016, Rhéaume was mentioned in an episode of the show Bones, (season 11, episode 18), as the only woman to play in an NHL game.

== Personal life ==
Rhéaume was married to Gerry St. Cyr, a minor league hockey player and roller hockey player, in June 1998, whom she later divorced. They have one son, Dylan. A goaltender like his mother, Dylan St. Cyr played for the Michigan State Spartans and previously served as goaltender for Notre Dame and Quinnipiac University.

After her divorce from Gerry St. Cyr, Rhéaume married her second husband, with whom she had a second son, Dakoda Rhéaume-Mullen, a defenseman who was drafted in the 2022 OHL Priority selection by the Sarnia Sting, 124th overall in the 7th round, and now plays for the Michigan Wolverines collegiately.

Rhéaume formed the Manon Rhéaume Foundation in 2008, which provides scholarships for young women.

She is the older sister of former NHL player Pascal Rhéaume.

== Career statistics ==
Career statistics from Eliteprospects or The Internet Hockey Database or The Western Women's Hockey League.

=== Ice hockey regular season ===
			Regular season
Season	Team	League	GP	W	L	T/OT	MIN	GA	SO	GAA	SV%
1991–92	Trois-Rivières Draveurs	QMJHL	1	0	1	0	18	3	0	10.55	.750
1992–93	Atlanta Knights	IHL	2	0	1	0	66	7	0	6.36	.806
1993–94	Knoxville Cherokees	ECHL	2	0	1	0	187	13	0	4.17	.870
1993–94	Nashville Knights	ECHL	4	3	0	0	197	12	0	3.64	.901
1994–95	Las Vegas Aces	PSHL	0	—	—	—	—	—	—	—	—
1994–95	Tallahassee Tiger Sharks	ECHL	1	0	1	0	20	4	0	12.00	.750
1994–95	Las Vegas Thunder	IHL	2	—	—	—	53	3	0	3.41	.824
1996–97	Reno Renegades	WCHL	11	2	4	0	425	40	0	5.65	.868
2000–01	Montreal Wingstar	NWHL	4	—	—	—	—	—	—	—	—
2007–08	Minnesota Whitecaps	WWHL	1	1	0	0	63	2	0	1.90	.939
2008–09	Minnesota Whitecaps	WWHL	2	2	0	0	120	6	0	3.00	.880
2008–09	Flint Generals	IHL	1	0	0	0	2	1	0	30.00	.000
WCHL totals			11	2	4	0	425	40	0	5.65	.868

=== Ice Hockey International ===
Year	Team	Event	Result	GP	W	L	OT	MIN	GA	SO	GAA	SV%
1992	Canada	WC	1st place, gold medalist(s)	3	-	-	-	-	-	-	0.67	0.957
1994	Canada	WC	1st place, gold medalist(s)	4	-	-	-	209:00	6	-	1.72	0.864
1998	Canada	OG	2nd place, silver medalist(s)	4	2	1	0	207:59	4	1	1.15	0.926

=== Inline hockey regular season ===
			Regular season
Season	Team	League	GP	W	L	T/OT	MIN	GA	SO	GAA	SV%
1993–94	New Jersey Rockin' Rollers	RHI	4	—	—	—	—	—	—	—	—
1994–95	New Jersey Rockin' Rollers	RHI	1	—	—	—	—	—	—	—	—
1995–96	Sacramento River Rats	RHI	4	—	—	—	—	—	—	—	—
1995–96	Ottawa Loggers	RHI	1	—	—	—	—	—	—	—	—
RHI totals			10	—	—	—	—	—	—	—	—

== Awards and honours ==
- 1992 All-Star Team, Top Goaltender
- 1994 All-Star Team, Top Goaltender

== Notables ==
- First girl to play at the Quebec International Pee-Wee Hockey Tournament.
- First woman to play in a major junior game [1991–92 Trois-Rivières Draveurs (QMJHL)]
- First woman to play in a National Hockey League game, which also made her the first woman to play in any of the major professional North American sports leagues (September 23, 1992). [1992 Tampa Bay Lightning (NHL), played one exhibition game]
- First woman to win a game in professional roller hockey
- Played one game with Feldkirch.
- 2000–01 Montreal Wingstar (Forward)
- 2007–08 Little Caesars Senior Women's A Hockey Team (Playing as a Forward instead of Goaltender)

== See also ==
- Ann Meyers, a woman who signed a contract with the Indiana Pacers in 1979
