= Ice hockey in Nevada =

- Flag of Nevada
- Country: United States
- Governing body: USA Hockey
- National teams: Men's national team Women's national team
- First played: 1993

Club competitions
- List: NHL (major professional) AHL (minor professional) USPHL (junior)

Nevada has seen increasing interest in ice hockey since the 1990s. The appearance and success of the Vegas Golden Knights has placed the sport on at the forefront for growth in the state.

== History ==
Nevada, as with many other mountain-west states, was overlooked by the ice hockey community for decades. With low population density and a dry, arid climate, Nevada was left without a local team until the mid-1990s. The Las Vegas Thunder arrival in 1993 brought ice hockey to the Las Vegas region, and the team was an instant success on the ice. The Thunder won two regular season titles in their first three years and were able to command crowds of nearly 8,000 per game at the Thomas & Mack Center. The team was not nearly as successful over the next three seasons and the Thunder saw their average attendance drop down to just over 5,000 in 1999. The quick decline changed the relationship between Las Vegas and the owners of their arena (UNLV) and the team found itself searching for a new home after the season. When no venue was found, the franchise ceased operations.

In the interim, a few other hockey teams appeared throughout the state but none survived into the 21st century. After a few years without a pro team in the state, the ECHL arrived with the Las Vegas Wranglers in 2003. Just like the Thunder before them, the Wranglers shot out of the starting gate and reached the conference finals four times in their first six seasons. While the team wasn't able to win a championship, their early success did endear them to the fans and create a loyal pool of supporters. Similar to the Thunder, the team was forced out of their home in 2014. The Orleans, which allowed the Wranglers to use the Orleans Arena for over a decade, decided to end the teams lease following the conclusion of the 2014 season. When Las Vegas was unable to find a new home for the following season, they suspended operations while searching for a permanent home. Plans for a new arena never came to pass as the team faded into history.

Shortly after the official demise of the Wranglers, plans were put into place to take advantage of the dearth of hockey in the state by Bill Foley. After securing deposits for more than 13,000 season tickets in the summer of 2015, Foley was one of two prospective bids that were advanced beyond the first phase. After a year's time to review, the NHL announced that they were formally accepting Foley's bid and awarded Las Vegas with a new franchise beginning in 2017.

Vegas had been one of the fastest growing cities in the United States, rising from a population of about 8,000 in 1940 to well over 500,000 by the early 21st-century. However, by 2017 the city was still missing a major professional sports team. This was largely due to the fact that Las Vegas was the central hub for gambling in the US and most leagues had a long-standing ban on wagering due to its past connections to match fixing through organized crime. With the rise in both legality and popularity of sports betting in the 21st century, Las Vegas had become less of a taboo town and the NHL was the first of the four major sports leagues to place a team in the region. The Vegas Golden Knights debuted in October 2017 and had the cities' major circuit all to themselves. That season saw major events that generated interest in the team.

The first, was the Las Vegas Strip shooting that saw a gunman kill 60 people while they were attending a music concert. Nine days later, at the franchise home opener, the Golden Knights held a ceremony in honor of the victims and served as a rallying point for civic pride for the remainder of the season, akin to what the Boston Red Sox had done following a terrorist attack at the Boston Marathon in 2013. Vegas went so far as to retire the number 58 in honor of the fifty eight people who had died immediately following the attack.

Secondly, the Golden Knights ended up producing the best season in the history of any expansion team in North American pro sports history. While most new teams finish with poor records and typically miss the postseason, Vegas took advantage of several personnel miscues by other teams and put together a roster that was able to compete straight away. The Golden Knights won the Pacific Division title in their first season and proceeded to reach the 2018 Stanley Cup Final. While the team was unable to win the cup that year, their success led to a large amount of publicity and interest in the team. Vegas continued as one of the better teams for the next several years and made its second championship appearance in 2023, this time managing to win the Stanley Cup. In the meantime, Vegas had founded a minor league team and placed it in nearby Henderson, Nevada, while an unaffiliated junior team had started up in the Vegas suburb of Summerlin South.

== Teams ==
=== Professional ===
==== Active ====
| Team | City | League | Arena | Founded |
|---|---|---|---|---|
| Vegas Golden Knights | Las Vegas | NHL | T-Mobile Arena | 2017 |
| Henderson Silver Knights | Henderson | AHL | Dollar Loan Center | 2020 |

==== Inactive ====
| Team | City | League | Years active | Fate |
|---|---|---|---|---|
| Las Vegas Thunder | Las Vegas | IHL | 1993–1999 | Defunct |
| Reno Renegades | Reno | WCHL | 1995–1997 | Reno Rage |
| Reno Rage | Reno | WCHL | 1997–1998 | Defunct |
| Las Vegas Wranglers | Las Vegas | ECHL | 2003–2014 | Defunct |

=== Junior ===
==== Active ====
| Team | City | League | Arena | Founded |
|---|---|---|---|---|
| Henderson Force | Henderson | USPHL | America First Center | 2024 |

==== Inactive ====
| Team | City | League | Years active | Fate |
|---|---|---|---|---|
| Nevada / Las Vegas Gamblers | Las Vegas | WSHL | 1997–2000 | Defunct |
| Nevada Rattlers | Las Vegas | WSHL | 2001–2003 | Defunct |
| Las Vegas Thunderbirds | Summerlin South | USPHL | 2019–2024 | Henderson Force |

=== Timeline ===
Active Active (out of state)

== Players ==
location of cities

The majority of ice hockey players in Nevada come from Las Vegas. While Nevada does not have a long history with the sport, it has nonetheless produced several players of note.

- Born in California, Jason Zucker moved to Nevada at the age of two months and grew up playing on the rinks around Las Vegas. He became the first Nevadan to play in the National Hockey League and went on to have a long career in the league.

=== Notable players by city ===
==== Las Vegas ====
- Eddie DelGrosso
- Mickey Lang
- Megan Myers
- Adam Naglich
- Jason Zucker ^{†}

† relocated from elsewhere.
