= Parker Stanfield =

American ice hockey player (b.1990)

- Born: June 20, 1990 (age 35) Orange County, CA, USA
- Height: 6 ft 1 in (185 cm)
- Weight: 174 lb (79 kg; 12 st 6 lb)
- Position: Right wing
- Shoots: Right
- SPHL team Former teams: Peoria Rivermen; Bakersfield Condors; HK SKP Poprad; South Carolina Stingrays; Florida Everblades
- NHL draft: Undrafted
- Playing career: 2011–present

Parker Stanfield (born June 20, 1990) is an American professional ice hockey player. He is currently playing for the Peoria Rivermen of the SPHL.

Stanfield played four seasons (2007 - 2011) of major junior hockey in the Western Hockey League (WHL), scoring 58 goals and 72 assists for 139 points, while registering 248 penalty minutes in 272 games played.

After playing 80 games in the ECHL with the Bakersfield Condors, Stanfield joined HK Poprad where he played eight Slovak Extraliga games during the 2012–13 season.

In 2012, he briefly dated Shelby Hennum.

On July 8, 2013, Stanfield returned the ECHL, signing for the 2013–14 season with the Colorado Eagles.

== Career statistics ==
			Regular season					Playoffs
Season	Team	League	GP	G	A	Pts	PIM	GP	G	A	Pts	PIM
2007–08	Prince George Cougars	WHL	67	14	9	23	56	—	—	—	—	—
2008–09	Prince George Cougars	WHL	72	18	19	37	74	3	0	0	0	2
2009–10	Prince George Cougars	WHL	69	13	23	36	61	—	—	—	—	—
2010–11	Prince George Cougars	WHL	4	1	3	4	5	—	—	—	—	—
2010–11	Everett Silvertips	WHL	60	12	18	30	52	2	0	0	0	0
2011–12	Bakersfield Condors	ECHL	47	13	17	30	51	—	—	—	—	—
2012–13	Bakersfield Condors	ECHL	33	6	7	13	35	—	—	—	—	—
2012–13	HK Poprad	Slovak	8	2	1	3	2	7	0	3	3	39
2013–14	Peoria Rivermen	SPHL	39	13	26	39	57	3	1	2	3	0
2013–14	South Carolina Stingrays	ECHL	3	1	2	3	4	—	—	—	—	—
2013–14	Florida Everblades	ECHL	7	1	0	1	2	—	—	—	—	—
ECHL totals			90	21	26	47	92	—	—	—	—	—
