= Pacific Hockey League (1994) =

American defunct semi-professional ice hockey league

- Formerly: Pacific Southwest Hockey League; Pacific Northwest Hockey League
- Sport: Ice hockey
- Founded: 1994
- Folded: 1995
- Replaced by: West Coast Hockey League (partial)
- No. of teams: 6
- Country: United States
- Last champion: Alaska Gold Kings
- Most titles: Alaska Gold Kings (1)

For the late 1970s ice hockey league, see Pacific Hockey League.

The Pacific Hockey League (PHL) was a short lived semi-professional ice hockey league in the western United States in the 1990s. The league was formed by a merger of two previous semi-professional leagues, the Pacific Southwest Hockey League and Pacific Northwest Hockey League. Several PHL teams became charter members of the professional West Coast Hockey League in 1995.

The PHL played only one season, 1994–95. In addition to its league schedule the Anchorage Aces played several out-of-league games, while the Fresno Falcons also played opponents from the Florida-based Sunshine Hockey League. The Fairbanks-based Alaska Gold Kings were the league's sole champions.

After the season three PHL teams, the Aces, Falcons and Gold Kings, joined the WCHL. A fourth team, the Los Angeles Bandits, briefly joined the dubious North American League before folding.

== Teams ==
Northwest Division

Team name	City
Alaska Gold Kings	Fairbanks, Alaska
Anchorage Aces	Anchorage, Alaska
Vancouver Thunderbirds	Vancouver, Washington (played in Seattle)

Pacific Southwest Division

Team name	City
California Hawks / Bakersfield Oilers	Anaheim, California
Fresno Falcons	Fresno, California
Los Angeles Bandits	Los Angeles, California
