= Bakersfield Oilers =

Pacific Southwest Hockey League team in Bakersfield, California

- City: Bakersfield, California
- League: Pacific Hockey League
- Founded: 1981
- Folded: 1995

Franchise history
- 1981–1983: Tri-Valley Blackhawks
- 1983–1985: West Covina Blackhawks
- 1985–1988: California Blackhawks
- 1988–1994: California Hawks
- 1994–1995: Bakersfield Oilers

Championships
- Playoff championships: 1991, 1993

The Bakersfield Oilers were a semi-pro hockey team in the Pacific Hockey League that played in Bakersfield, California, in 1994–95. The Oilers played out of the 4,100 seat Bakersfield Convention Center. The Oilers were the predecessor to the Bakersfield Fog of the West Coast Hockey League. They made the transition along with the Alaska Gold Kings (Fairbanks, Alaska), Anchorage Aces (Anchorage, Alaska), and Fresno Falcons (Fresno, California) to a minor professional league in 1995–96. The players had college, major junior, junior A and minor pro experience. Many of the players spent their off season playing roller hockey Roller Hockey International and were living in southern California.

== Players ==
- #1 - Matt Even
- #2 - Jeff Furlong
- #3 - Gerald Glass
- #6 - Steve Ross
- #7 - Jim Cashman
- #9 - Tom Imperato
- #10 - Alex Austin
- #11 - Todd Nelson
- #12 - Simon Bibeau
- #14 - Russ Franklin (Assistant Captain)
- #15 - Scott Zwygart
- #17 - Mike Callahan (Captain)
- #18 - Bill Miller
- #19 - Dean Wilson
- #20 - Barry Sherer (Assistant Captain)
- #23 - Craig Butz
- #24 - Dave Nash
- #25 - Mike McGrath
- #27 - John Redinger
- #28 - Rick Plester
- #32 - Brad Scholl
- #44 - Mike Butters
- #57 - Bob Wood (team owner, goal tender)
