= Las Vegas Gamblers (ice hockey) =

- City: Las Vegas, Nevada
- League: California-Nevada Hockey League
- Founded: 1968
- Folded: 1975
- Home arena: Las Vegas Ice Palace

Franchise history
- 1968–1971: Las Vegas Gamblers
- 1971–1975: Las Vegas Outlaws

The Las Vegas Gamblers was a semi-professional ice hockey team from Las Vegas, Nevada. The club was a founding member of the California-Nevada Hockey League and, by all accounts, the first formal ice hockey team in the state of Nevada.

== History ==
In the late-1960s, the Teamsters Union was in charge of construction in Las Vegas and one of their projects was the city's first indoor ice rink, the Ice Palace. While the arena had no team in mind when it was built, a semi-pro club was soon formed and the team called themselves the 'Gamblers'. By the fall of 1968, the team was able to come to terms with three other teams in California and Reno to form the California-Nevada Hockey League (Cal-Neva) and played three seasons. While the people who showed up for the games were enthusiastic, the Gamblers were a somewhat esoteric form of entertainment in Vegas as the time and with competition like Elvis Presley, Liberace and Tom Jones taking up most of the attention, only a few hundred people would attend the games.

In 1971, with the team in dire financial straits, the Gamblers needed a new influx of cash. Casino magnate Ralph Engelstad, who had played college hockey at North Dakota, took control of the team and changed the name to the 'Outlaws'. Engelstad changed the course of the club but some of his actions irked the other league members. After the Gamblers were caught violating league rules several times, the Outlaws were expelled and all of their results for the year were retroactively wiped out. Now operating solely as an independent club, Engelstad was able to arrange matches with US national team during the run up to the 1972 Winter Olympics as well as several clubs from Europe and increase the profile of the club. By the mid-70's, the team was experiencing troubles both on and off the ice as players were reported to have behaved poorly during their trip to Germany. However, the bigger issue was the spat between Engelstad and the owner of the Ice Palace. After 1975, the club lost access to the rink. Initially, Engelstad planned to build his own rink in the region and continue running the club, however, no plans were ever set in motion and the Outlaws ceased to exist.
