= Reno Renegades =

- City: Reno, Nevada
- Operated: 1995–1998
- Home arena: Reno-Sparks Convention Center
- Colors: Red, blue, yellow (Renegades); Purple, black (Rage)

Franchise history
- 1995–1997: Reno Renegades
- 1997–1998: Reno Rage

Championships
- Regular season titles: 0
- Division titles: 0
- Taylor Cups: 0

The Reno Renegades were a short-lived American professional minor league ice hockey team based in Reno, Nevada. The team was a founding member of the West Coast Hockey League (WCHL).

== History ==
The Renegades began play in the 1995–96 season in the WCHL. Although the Renegades never moved past the first round of the WCHL playoffs, the team achieved notoriety in 1996 by signing female goaltender Manon Rhéaume, who earlier in the decade played in preseason games for the NHL's Tampa Bay Lightning. Rhéaume appeared in 11 regular season games for the Renegades during the 1996–97 season.

In 1997, the team was renamed the Reno Rage, but folded after the 1997–98 season.

=== Possible return as an ECHL team ===
In 2000, the rights to the defunct Renegades/Rage organization were purchased by businessman Larry Leasure of Boise, Idaho. When the WCHL was absorbed by the ECHL in 2003, Leasure announced his intention to base the team in that league as the Reno Raiders. Although Leasure hoped to have the team operational by the 2007–08 season, he has been unable to secure an interest in a suitable arena in the Reno area. Leasure has said he would reassess his progress after the season.

Until 2016, Reno was listed on the ECHL's Future Markets page before it was removed. A new group called Reno Puck Club, LLC began negotiations with the city council to bring a new ECHL team to Reno, indicating that any new team will have no connections to the Renegades/Rage franchise.

== Season-by-season record ==
Note: GP = Games played, W = Wins, L = Losses, OTL = Overtime losses, SOL = Shootout losses, Pts = Points, GF = Goals for, GA = Goals against, PIM = Penalties in minutes

Final records.

Season	League	GP	W	L	OTL	SOL	Pts	GF	GA	PIM	Finish	Coach	Playoffs
1995–96	WCHL	58	26	24	-	8	60	271	283	1236	3rd, WCHL	Ron Flockhart	Lost in round 1, 0-3 (Fresno)
1996–97	WCHL	64	16	43	-	5	37	252	418	1768	5th, WCHL	Ron Flockhart, Shaun Clouston	Missed playoffs
1997–98	WCHL	64	23	39	-	2	48	219	297	1365	4th, North	Ron Flockhart	Lost in round 1, 0-3 (Tacoma)

== Logos ==
Reno Rage, 1997–98
