= San Diego Surf (ice hockey) =

- City: San Diego, California
- League: Pacific Southwest Hockey League
- Founded: 1988
- Folded: 1992

Franchise history
- 1988–1992: San Diego Surf

Championships
- Playoff championships: 1989, 1990

The San Diego Surf were a semi-professional ice hockey team based in San Diego, California, that competed in the Pacific Southwest Hockey League from 1988 to 1992.

== History ==
San Diego was created in the wake of the Los Angeles Bruins dissolution in 1988. The club had a brief but spectacular life, winning the PSHL shcmpionship in each of its first two seasons while hardly losing a game. The Surf just just 5 games in its first three seasons and was by far the best team in the league. However, the team was never stable financially and by year four everything took a turn for the worse. The Surf lost more games in 1992 than they had in all other campaigns combined and by the end of the season the team was disbanded.

== Season-by-season results ==
Season	GP	W	L	T	Pts	Finish	Postseason
1988–89	23	22	0	1	45	1st	Champions
1989–90	16	14	2	0	28	1st	Champions
1990–91	18	17	1	0	34	1st	Runner-Up
1991–92	–	–	–	–	–	–	missed
