= San Diego Sharks =

- City: San Diego, California
- League: Pacific Southwest Hockey League
- Founded: 1975
- Folded: 1978

Championships
- Playoff championships: 1977

The San Diego Sharks were a semi-professional ice hockey team based in San Diego, California. The club played three seasons in the Pacific Southwest Hockey League.

== History ==
With the PSHL at its most popular extent, the San Diego Sharks were welcomed into the league in 1975. Just two years later, the Sharks won the league championship, ending the Fresno Falcons' four-year run. In their third season, the team welcomed in former National Hockey League player Willie O'Ree. and made a run for a second championship but were stymied by the Falcons in the finals. Despite the team's success, they were not able to get financial stability and the club suspended operations in 1978.

== Season-by-season results ==
Season	GP	W	L	T	Pts	Finish	Postseason
1975–76	–	–	–	–	–	–	missed
1976–77	–	–	–	–	30	2nd	Champions
1977–78	–	–	–	–	–	2nd	Runner-Up
