= Ron Flockhart (ice hockey) =

Canadian ice hockey player (born 1960)

- Born: October 10, 1960 (age 65) Smithers, British Columbia, Canada
- Height: 5 ft 11 in (180 cm)
- Weight: 185 lb (84 kg; 13 st 3 lb)
- Position: Centre
- Shot: Left
- Played for: Philadelphia Flyers; Pittsburgh Penguins; Montreal Canadiens; St. Louis Blues; Boston Bruins
- NHL draft: Undrafted
- Playing career: 1980–1991

Ronald Everett Flockhart (born October 10, 1960) is a Canadian former professional ice hockey player. He is the brother of Rob Flockhart.

== Playing career ==
Ron Flockhart scored over 300 NHL points in the 1980s playing mostly with the Philadelphia Flyers and St. Louis Blues. After an impressive season with the Regina Pats during the 1979–80 Western Hockey League season, he was signed as a free agent by the Philadelphia Flyers. While he played most of the '80–81 season with the Flyers' AHL affiliate Maine Mariners, he appeared in 14 regular season and three playoff games for the parent team. His best NHL season came the following year, as Flockhart averaged a point a game, scoring 33 goals and assisting on another 39 for 72 points. Though he enjoyed another solid year in 1982–83 with 29 goals and 60 points in 73 games, the Flyers as a team continued to have trouble advancing in the playoffs. After a slow start at the beginning of the '83–84 season, Flockhart was traded to the Pittsburgh Penguins as part of the trade that brought Rich Sutter to Philadelphia.

Flockhart spent the next two seasons playing for the Penguins and Montreal Canadiens, and in 1985–86 joined the St. Louis Blues where he tallied 22 goals and added 45 assists. It was his highest point total since his first season with the Flyers. Over the next few years, Flockhart's playing time fell with the Blues, and he ended his NHL career with a four-game stint on the Boston Bruins. Although Flockhart's NHL career was at an end, his professional career continued for a few more years with SG Cortina and Bolzano HC in Italy.

Flockhart's style was often called "Flocky (or Flockey or Flockie) Hockey" for his tendency to rag the puck rather than move it quickly up ice.

== Awards ==
According to Gene Hart, former play-by-play television and radio commentator for the Philadelphia Flyers, Flockhart won the "Grizzly Award" each year he played for the Flyers. As recollected in his autobiography "Score: My 25 Years With the Broad Street Bullies", Hart created this "award" for the NHL player born in Smithers, BC who had the highest point total at the end of each NHL season. Hart originally coined the award as a joke between Joe Watson and his younger brother Jimmy Watson, both low scoring Flyers defencemen who were born and raised in Smithers (and at the time were the only two players from this small British Columbia town). With the emergence of Flockhart, he became a lock for the award during his NHL playing days.

== Records ==
- Holds Philadelphia Flyers record for fastest two goals (8 seconds) during a game against the St. Louis Blues on December 6, 1981. The Flyers won the game 8–2.

== Career statistics ==
=== Regular season and playoffs ===
			Regular season					Playoffs
Season	Team	League	GP	G	A	Pts	PIM	GP	G	A	Pts	PIM
1977–78	Medicine Hat Tigers	WCHL	5	1	0	1	2	—	—	—	—	—
1979–80	Regina Pats	WHL	65	54	76	130	63	17	11	23	34	18
1980–81	Maine Mariners	AHL	59	33	33	66	76	—	—	—	—	—
1980–81	Philadelphia Flyers	NHL	14	3	7	10	11	3	1	0	1	2
1981–82	Philadelphia Flyers	NHL	72	33	39	72	44	4	0	1	1	2
1982–83	Philadelphia Flyers	NHL	73	29	31	60	49	2	1	1	2	2
1983–84	Philadelphia Flyers	NHL	8	0	3	3	4	—	—	—	—	—
1983–84	Pittsburgh Penguins	NHL	68	27	18	45	40	—	—	—	—	—
1984–85	Pittsburgh Penguins	NHL	12	0	5	5	4	—	—	—	—	—
1984–85	Montreal Canadiens	NHL	42	10	12	22	14	2	1	1	2	2
1985–86	St. Louis Blues	NHL	79	22	45	67	26	8	1	3	4	6
1986–87	St. Louis Blues	NHL	60	16	19	35	12	—	—	—	—	—
1987–88	St. Louis Blues	NHL	21	5	4	9	4	—	—	—	—	—
1988–89	Peoria Rivermen	IHL	2	0	2	2	0	—	—	—	—	—
1988–89	Maine Mariners	AHL	9	5	6	11	0	—	—	—	—	—
1988–89	Boston Bruins	NHL	4	0	0	0	0	—	—	—	—	—
1988–89	SG Cortina	ITA		31	34	65	25	—	—	—	—	—
1989–90	Bolzano HC	ITA	40	53	94	147	15	—	—	—	—	—
1990–91	Bolzano HC	ITA	33	36	44	80	32	—	—	—	—	—
NHL totals			453	145	183	328	208	19	4	6	10	14

== Coaching ==
Flockhart also coached the Dallas Freeze of the Central Hockey League for 3 seasons (1992–93 through 1994–95) as well as the Reno Renegades (later called the Reno Rage) of the WCHL between 1995–96 and 1997–98.
