= Los Angeles Bruins (ice hockey) =

- City: Burbank, California
- League: California-Nevada Hockey League, Pacific Southwest Hockey League
- Founded: 1969
- Folded: 1988

Franchise history
- 1969–1970: Bakersfield Bruins
- 1970–1988: Los Angeles Bruins

Championships
- Playoff championships: 1970, 1979, 1981, 1982, 1983, 1985, 1988

The Los Angeles Bruins were a semi-professional ice hockey team from Burbank. Originally located in Bakersfield, the club was a founding member of the Pacific Southwest Hockey League and played for nearly 2 decades.

== History ==
As the Bakersfield Bruins, the franchise won the California-Nevada Hockey League championship in 1970. That summer, the team relocated to Burbank and remained there for the rest of its existence. after the league rebranded as the Pacific Southwest Hockey League, Los Angeles was regularly one of the two best teams in the league, competing with the Fresno Falcons for PSHL supremacy. Unfortunately, the team was never stable financially. Despite the existence of the Los Angeles Kings, the LA market was never too keen on hockey while the Bruins were around. Most of the Bruins games were open to the public for free but paired with other events such as Roller derby. The Bruins were able to hold on until 1988, winning their seventh league championship before folding for good.

== Season-by-season results ==
Season	GP	W	L	T	Pts	Finish	Postseason
1969–70	–	–	–	–	–	–	Champions
1970–71	–	–	–	–	–	–	Runner-Up
1971–72	–	–	–	–	–	–	missed
1972–73	–	–	–	–	–	–	Runner-Up
1973–74	–	–	–	–	–	–	missed
1974–75	–	–	–	–	–	–	Runner-Up
1975–76	–	–	–	–	–	–	Runner-Up
1976–77	–	–	–	–	30	T–1st	Runner-Up
1977–78	–	–	–	–	–	–	missed
1978–79	14	9	2	3	21	2nd	Champions
1979–80	–	–	–	–	–	–	Runner-Up
1980–81	–	–	–	–	–	–	Champions
1981–82	–	–	–	–	–	–	Champions
1982–83	18	11	5	2	24	2nd	Champions
1983–84	17	10	6	1	21	2nd	Runner-Up
1984–85	18	10	7	1	21	2nd	Champions
1985–86	18	9	8	1	19	3rd	missed
1986–87	18	9	7	2	20	2nd	Runner-Up
1987–88	18	7	9	2	16	2nd	Champions
