= West Covina Eagles =

- City: West Covina, California
- League: California-Nevada Hockey League, Pacific Southwest Hockey League
- Founded: 1969
- Folded: 1981

Franchise history
- 1969–1978: West Covina Eagles
- 1978–1981: California Eagles

Championships
- Playoff championships: 1972

The West Covina Eagles were a semi-professional ice hockey team from West Covina, California. The club was a founding member of the Pacific Southwest Hockey League and played throughout the 1970s.

== History ==
West Covina got its start in 1969 in the California-Nevada Hockey League and won the league championship in 1972. That summer, the league changed its name to the Pacific Southwest Hockey League but was otherwise unchanged. In 1978, the team changed its name to 'California Eagles' but that didn't help stave off their financial difficulties. In 1981, the team suspended operations and have not played since.

== Season-by-season results ==
| Season | GP | W | L | T | Pts | Finish | Postseason |
|---|---|---|---|---|---|---|---|
| 1969–70 | – | – | – | – | – | – | missed |
| 1970–71 | – | – | – | – | – | – | missed |
| 1971–72 | – | – | – | – | – | – | Champions |
| 1972–73 | – | – | – | – | – | – | missed |
| 1973–74 | – | – | – | – | – | – | Runner-Up |
| 1974–75 | – | – | – | – | – | – | missed |
| 1975–76 | – | – | – | – | – | – | missed |
| 1976–77 | – | – | – | – | – | – | missed |
| 1977–78 | – | – | – | – | – | – | missed |
| 1978–79 | – | – | – | – | – | – | missed |
| 1979–80 | – | – | – | – | – | – | missed |
| 1980–81 | – | – | – | – | – | – | missed |
