= Tiger's blood =

Dessert flavor combining strawberry, watermelon, and coconut

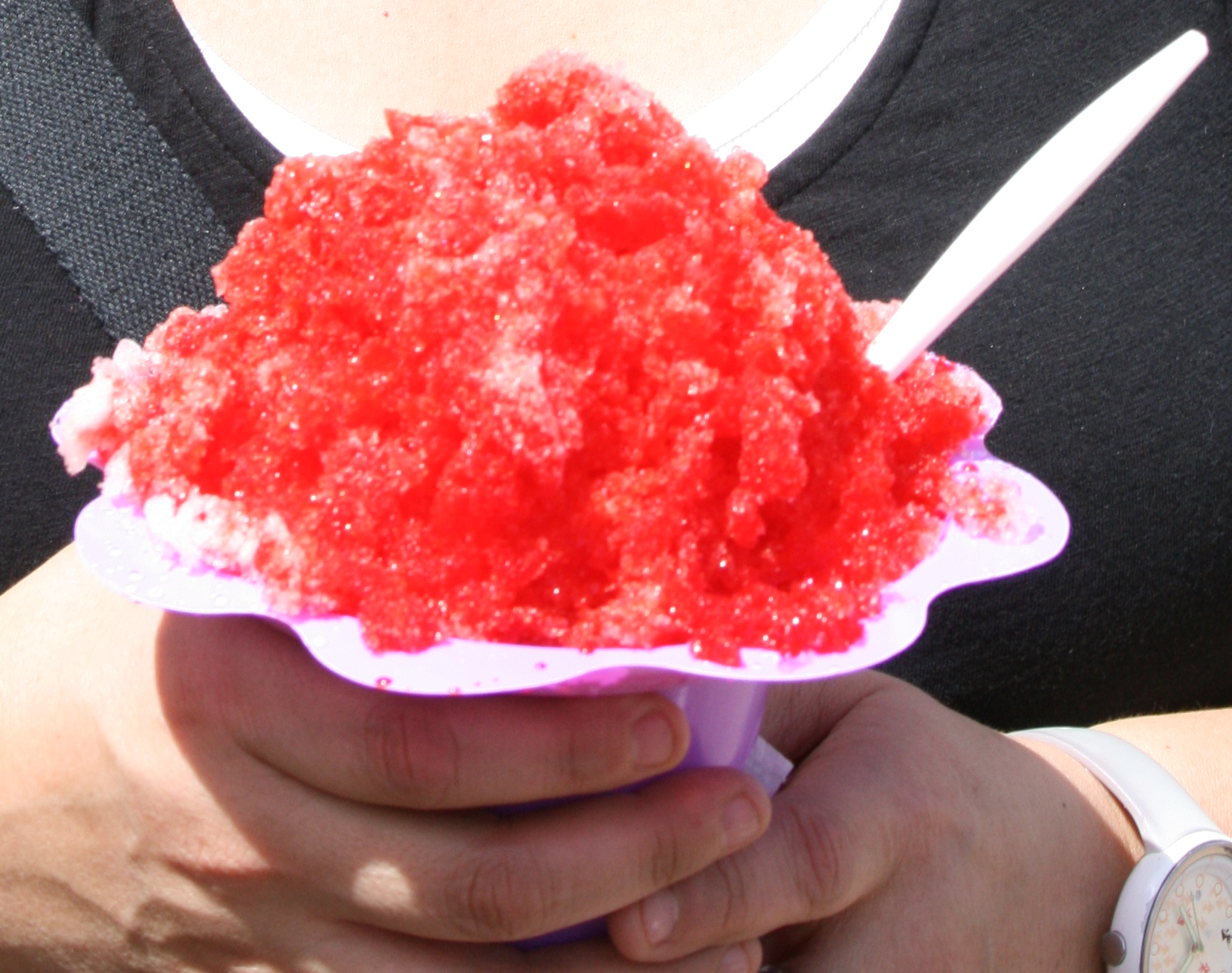
- a tiger's blood ice
- Alternative names: tiger blood
- Type: flavor
- Course: dessert
- Associated cuisine: American cuisine
- Main ingredients: strawberry, watermelon, and coconut

Tiger's blood or tiger blood is a flavor of shave ice, snow cones, and other products.

Contrary to the flavor's name, it does not contain blood or anything from tigers. The flavor is a combination of strawberry, watermelon, and a smaller amount of coconut, though some syrup makers have slightly different recipes and add other flavors like cherry.

Though the flavor is strongly associated with Hawaiʻi, some think it originated in Texas in the 1980s. However, ads from the area at the time make clear the connection to Hawaiʻi, and the flavor was still considered exotic in Texas into the next decade. Also in the mid 1980's tiger blood was appearing in Utah and South Carolina along with imaginative flavors like "rock & roll" and "popeye". In 1977 the flavor was in Missouri at a New Orleans-style shave-ice shop.
