= Pacific Southwest Hockey League =

American semi-professional ice hockey league

The Pacific Southwest Hockey League was a semi-professional ice hockey league that operated in California, Nevada and Alaska starting in 1972 and ran through 1995, when its members were incorporated into the upstart professional West Coast Hockey League. The league operated as the California-Nevada Hockey League from 1968 to 1972.

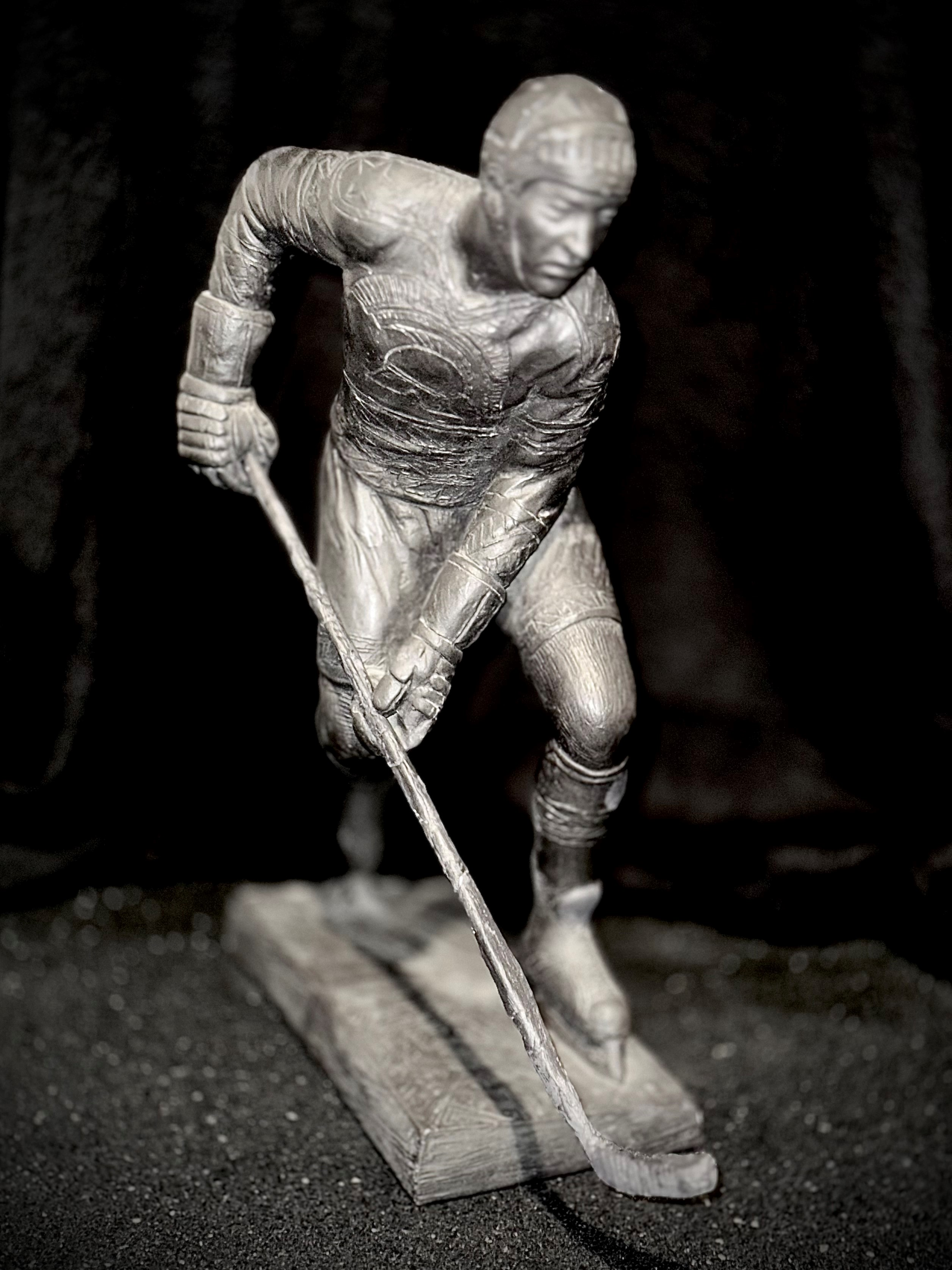
The James C. Freeman Championship Trophy, awarded every seventh year to the PSHL franchise who earned the most league titles over the previous six years. Shown is the first iteration (of at least three) of the trophy. (Central California Sports Archive)

== The league's focus ==
The PSHL's signature franchise was the Fresno Falcons largely due to convenience and the availability of a then-relatively new showcase arena, Selland Arena in Fresno's Convention Center. At times throughout the league's history, some games even if not involving the Falcons were held at Selland Arena.

A PSHL season ranged from 15 to 30 games each between anywhere from 4 to 8 teams. Franchises shifted frequently, often with new teams appearing the next season from the same cities. The mainstays of the league were the Fresno Falcons, the Los Angeles Bruins and later in the league's history, the Burbank or Los Angeles Jets and the West Covina or California Blackhawks (later just Hawks).

Fighting was also a signature of the league. Games of the day celebrated the rowdy spirit of the Broad Street Bullies era of hockey. Most PSHL cities were not traditional hockey markets, and the relaxed atmosphere which allowed a little more leeway to fight, attracting an audience that might not otherwise have attended PSHL games.

PSHL games were often paired with side attractions when it came to teams' marketing, including broomball and Roller Derby.

== Players ==
The PSHL's players often were unpaid, not uncommon in semi-professional hockey.

Many had professional hockey experience, with perhaps the most notable being Willie O'Ree, celebrated as the first black NHL player. O'Ree played his penultimate season with the San Diego Sharks in 1977–78.

Player/coaches were a common occurrence in the PSHL, and many players also played in other professional, amateur, or even senior leagues at the same time as their PSHL tenure.

== 1980-1994 - Changes and uncertainty ==
The PSHL continued into the 1980s and 90s largely unchanged, though events that were unusual began to periodically indicate instability.

The 1980–81 season saw the entire league schedule moved up two weeks, just six games into the season, as the Reno Gamblers franchise folded abruptly amid financial concerns. It was the Gamblers' first season in the league, and the league's remaining schedule was hurriedly filled out by league officials in order to still play 18 games per team. Players from the Gamblers were disbursed amongst the other teams in the league simply by each player being deemed a free agent.

1990 saw several noted Fresno Falcons players, including top scorer Hank Taylor, leave the team and join an upstart Cal-Nev Senior Hockey League team known as the Fresno Aces. The Aces played two seasons in Fresno's Icelandia ice rink before folding. Only one of the departed players, Bob Barlow, would return to the Falcons.

A January 1992 game between the Fresno Falcons and Bay Area Leafs would feature a bench clearing brawl resulting in injuries to several players and one linesman in the final minutes of the second period. After nearly an hour of delays, the game continued with only a few players left on the Leafs bench. The Leafs suspended operations the next day.

The Fresno Falcons' longtime ownership group of Byron Wallace and Al Geller sold the team in 1994. A new coach, John Olver, took over the daily operations, and implemented a number of changes which would lead to the merger with several teams in the Pacific Northwest to form the Pacific Hockey League and eventually the West Coast Hockey League.

== PSHL teams through the years ==
The teams that participated in the PSHL throughout the years are:

- Alaska Gold Kings
- Anaheim Flyers
- Anchorage Aces
- Bakersfield Bruins
- Bay Area Leafs
- Burbank Flyers
- Burbank Jets
- California Blackhawks
- California Eagles
- California Hawks
- Culver City Blues
- Culver City Canadians
- Culver City Falcons
- Fresno Aces
- Fresno Falcons
- Golden State Condors
- Lake Arrowhead Jets
- Las Vegas Aces
- Las Vegas Gamblers
- Los Angeles Bruins
- Los Angeles Jets
- Los Angeles Rockets
- Orange County Outlaws
- Reno Gamblers
- Sacramento Rebels
- San Diego Sharks
- San Diego Surf
- Tri-Valley Blackhawks
- West Covina Blackhawks
- West Covina Eagles

== Champions ==
- 1970: Bakersfield Bruins
- 1971: Fresno Falcons
- 1972: West Covina Eagles
- 1973: Fresno Falcons
- 1974: Fresno Falcons
- 1975: Fresno Falcons
- 1976: Fresno Falcons
- 1977: San Diego Sharks
- 1978: Fresno Falcons
- 1979: Los Angeles Bruins
- 1980: Fresno Falcons
- 1981: Los Angeles Bruins
- 1982: Los Angeles Bruins
- 1983: Los Angeles Bruins
- 1984: Fresno Falcons
- 1985: Los Angeles Bruins
- 1986: Fresno Falcons
- 1987: Fresno Falcons
- 1988: Los Angeles Bruins
- 1989: San Diego Surf
- 1990: San Diego Surf
- 1991: California Hawks
- 1992: Lake Arrowhead Jets
- 1993: California Hawks
- 1994: Fresno Falcons
